= 1871 Chicago White Stockings season =

1871 Chicago White Stockings
- League: National Association of Professional Base Ball Players
- Ballpark: Union Base-Ball Grounds
- City: Chicago
- Record: 19–9 (.679)
- League place: 2nd
- Owners: George Gage
- Managers: Jimmy Wood

The 1871 Chicago White Stockings season was the second season of the Chicago White Stockings franchise, the first in the National Association of Professional Base Ball Players and the first at Union Base-Ball Grounds.

With the debut of the first professional baseball league, the National Association, the Chicago franchise joined up as the "White Stockings." The team went 19–9 and finished second in the league standings. Pitcher George Zettlein started all 28 of Chicago's games and led the NA with a 2.73 earned run average.

Near the end of the season, the team lost its stadiums and equipment when the Great Chicago Fire hit the city. The team was able to finish out the season on the road, but had to drop out of the league while the city attempted to recover. The team would not resurface until 1874.

== Regular season ==
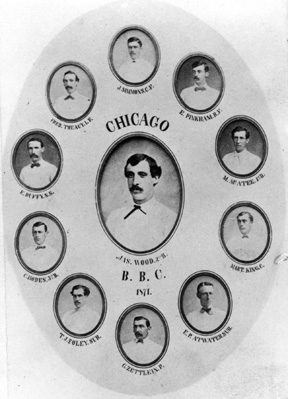
Cabinet card of the 1871 Chicago White Stockings

=== Season standings ===
Pos	Team	Pld	W	L	T	RF	RA	RD	PCT	GB
1	Philadelphia Athletics (C)	28	21	7	0	376	266	+110	.750	—
2	Chicago White Stockings	28	19	9	0	302	241	+61	.679	2
3	Boston Red Stockings	31	20	10	1	401	303	+98	.661	2
4	Washington Olympics	32	15	15	2	310	303	+7	.500	7
5	New York Mutuals	33	16	17	0	302	313	−11	.485	7.5
6	Troy Haymakers	29	13	15	1	351	362	−11	.466	8
7	Fort Wayne Kekiongas	19	7	12	0	137	243	−106	.368	9.5
8	Cleveland Forest Citys	29	10	19	0	249	341	−92	.345	11.5
9	Rockford Forest Citys	25	4	21	0	231	287	−56	.160	15.5

Source: Baseball Reference
(C) Champions

=== Record vs. opponents ===
1871 National Association Records Sources:
Team	BOS	CHI	CLE	FW	NY	PHI	ROC	TRO	WSH
Boston	—	1–3	3–1	2–0	2–2	3–1	3–0	3–2	3–1–1
Chicago	3–1	—	2–1	2–0	3–1	2–3	3–0	1–1	3–2
Cleveland	1–3	1–2	—	0–3	3–2	0–3	3–1	2–2	0–3
Fort Wayne	0–2	0–2	3–0	—	1–2	0–2	1–1	1–1	1–2
New York	2–2	1–3	2–3	2–1	—	2–3	3–1	1–3	3–1
Philadelphia	1–3	3–2	3–0	2–0	3–2	—	3–0	3–0	3–0
Rockford	0–3	0–3	1–3	1–1	1–3	0–3	—	1–2	0–3
Troy	2–3	1–1	2–2	1–1	3–1	0–3	2–1	—	2–3–1
Washington	1–3–1	2–3	3–0	2–1	1–3	0–3	3–0	3–2–1	—

=== Roster ===
1871 Chicago White Stockings
Roster
Pitchers: George Zettlein	Catchers: Charlie Hodes; Infielders: Mike Brannock; Ed Duffy; Bub McAtee; Ed Pinkham; Jimmy Wood	Outfielders: Tom Foley; Marshall King; Joe Simmons; Fred Treacey	Manager: Jimmy Wood

== Player stats ==
=== Batting ===
==== Starters by position ====
Note: Pos = Position; G = Games played; AB = At bats; H = Hits; Avg. = Batting average; HR = Home runs; RBI = Runs batted in

Pos	Player	G	AB	H	Avg.	HR	RBI
C	Charlie Hodes	28	130	36	.277	2	25
1B	Bub McAtee	26	135	37	.274	0	10
2B	Jimmy Wood	28	135	51	.378	1	29
SS	Ed Duffy	26	121	28	.231	0	15
3B	Ed Pinkham	24	95	25	.263	1	17
OF	Tom Foley	18	84	22	.262	0	13
OF	Fred Treacey	25	124	42	.339	4	33
OF	Joe Simmons	27	129	28	.217	0	17

==== Other batters ====
Note: G = Games played; AB = At bats; H = Hits; Avg. = Batting average; HR = Home runs; RBI = Runs batted in

Player	G	AB	H	Avg.	HR	RBI
Marshall King	20	101	21	.208	2	16
Mike Brannock	3	14	1	.071	0	0

=== Pitching ===
==== Starting pitchers ====
Note: G = Games pitched; IP = Innings pitched; W = Wins; L = Losses; ERA = Earned run average; SO = Strikeouts

Player	G	IP	W	L	ERA	SO
George Zettlein	28	240.2	18	9	2.73	22

==== Relief pitchers ====
Note: G = Games pitched; IP = Innings pitched; W = Wins; L = Losses; ERA = Earned run average; SO = Strikeouts

Player	G	IP	W	L	ERA	SO
Ed Pinkham	3	10.1	1	0	3.48	0
