= 1872 Brooklyn Eckfords season =

1872 Brooklyn Eckfords
- League: National Association of Professional Base Ball Players
- Ballpark: Union Grounds
- City: Brooklyn, New York
- Record: 3–26 (.103)
- League place: 9th
- Managers: Jim Clinton, Jimmy Wood

The Brooklyn Eckfords played their first and only season of professional baseball in 1872 as a member of the National Association of Professional Base Ball Players. They finished ninth in the league with a record of 3-26.

== Regular season ==
=== Season standings ===
Pos	Team	Pld	W	L	T	RF	RA	RD	GB
1	Boston Red Stockings (C)	48	39	8	1	521	236	+285	—
2	Baltimore Canaries	58	35	19	4	617	434	+183	7.5
3	New York Mutuals	56	34	20	2	523	362	+161	8.5
4	Philadelphia Athletics	47	30	14	3	539	349	+190	7.5
5	Troy Haymakers	25	15	10	0	273	191	+82	13
6	Brooklyn Atlantics	37	9	28	0	237	473	−236	25
7	Cleveland Forest Citys	22	6	16	0	174	254	−80	20.5
8	Middletown Mansfields	24	5	19	0	220	348	−128	22.5
9	Brooklyn Eckfords	29	3	26	0	152	413	−261	27
10	Washington Olympics	9	2	7	0	54	140	−86	18
11	Washington Nationals	11	0	11	0	80	190	−110	21

Source: Baseball Reference
(C) Champions

=== Record vs. opponents ===
1872 National Association Records Sources:
Team	BAL	BOS	BRA	BRE	CLE	MID	NY	PHI	TRO	WSN	WSO
Baltimore	—	0–7	5–1	5–1	4–1	4–0	5–4–2	4–5–2	3–0	3–0	2–0
Boston	7–0	—	7–1	3–0	4–0	3–0	7–2	4–4–1	2–1	1–0	1–0
Brooklyn Atlantics	1–5	1–7	—	2–2	1–1	2–1	2–6	0–4	0–2	0–0	0–0
Brooklyn Eckfords	1–5	0–3	2–2	—	0–1	0–2	0–5	0–5	0–3	0–0	0–0
Cleveland	1–4	0–4	1–1	1–0	—	0–1	1–2	0–3	0–1	1–0	1–0
Middletown	0–4	0–3	1–2	2–0	1–0	—	0–4	0–2	0–4	1–0	0–0
New York	4–5–2	2–7	6–2	5–0	2–1	4–0	—	6–3	3–2	1–0	1–0
Philadelphia	5–4–2	4–4–1	4–0	5–0	3–0	2–0	3–6	—	2–0	1–0	1–0
Troy	0–3	1–2	2–0	3–0	1–0	4–0	2–3	0–2	—	1–0	1–0
Washington Nationals	0–3	0–1	0–0	0–0	0–1	0–1	0–1	0–1	0–1	—	0–2
Washington Olympics	0–2	0–1	0–0	0–0	0–1	0–0	0–1	0–1	0–1	2–0	—

=== Roster ===
1872 Brooklyn Eckfords
Roster
Pitchers: Thomas Malone; Phonney Martin; Joe McDermott; O'Rourke; George Zettlein; Catchers: Doug Allison; William Bestick; Nat Jewett; David Lenz	Infielders: Andy Allison; Doug Allison; James Cavanagh; Frank Fleet; Jim Holdsworth; Al Martin; Jack McDonald; Candy Nelson; Jim Snyder; Marty Swandell; Jimmy Wood	Outfielders: Jim Clinton; George Fletcher; Count Gedney; Dick Hunt; Tom Patterson; Josh Snyder	Managers: Jim Clinton; Jimmy Wood

== Player stats ==
=== Batting ===
Note: G = Games played; AB = At bats; H = Hits; Avg. = Batting average; HR = Home runs; RBI = Runs batted in

Player	G	AB	H	Avg.	HR	RBI
Doug Allison	18	83	28	.337	0	4
Andy Allison	22	92	15	.163	0	10
Jimmy Wood	7	31	6	.194	0	0
Jim Snyder	25	103	30	.291	0	11
Frank Fleet	13	53	12	.226	0	6
Tom Patterson	12	47	10	.213	0	3
Josh Snyder	9	37	6	.162	0	1
Count Gedney	18	71	13	.183	0	6
Jim Clinton	25	98	24	.245	0	6
Candy Nelson	18	76	19	.250	0	9
Marty Swandell	14	52	12	.231	0	4
Dick Hunt	11	46	15	.326	0	4
James Cavanagh	5	23	6	.261	0	4
Bill Allison	6	21	3	.143	0	1
Al Martin	4	18	5	.278	0	1
Martin Malone	5	16	6	.375	0	3
William Bestick	4	14	4	.286	0	0
David Lenz	4	12	1	.083	0	0
Jim Holdsworth	3	11	3	.273	0	0
Nat Jewett	2	8	1	.125	0	0
George Fletcher	2	8	2	.250	0	1
Jack McDonald	1	4	0	.000	0	0

=== Starting pitchers ===
Note: G = Games played; IP = Innings pitched; W = Wins; L = Losses; ERA = Earned run average; SO = Strikeouts

Player	G	IP	W	L	ERA	SO
Phonney Martin	10	85.0	2	7	3.92	3
George Zettlein	9	75.1	1	8	3.58	8
James McDermott	7	63.0	0	7	8.14	1
Martin Malone	2	18.0	0	2	10.50	0
O'Rourke	1	9.0	0	1	8.00	0
Jim Clinton	1	9.0	0	1	7.00	1
