= John McMullin (baseball) =

American baseball player (1849–1881)

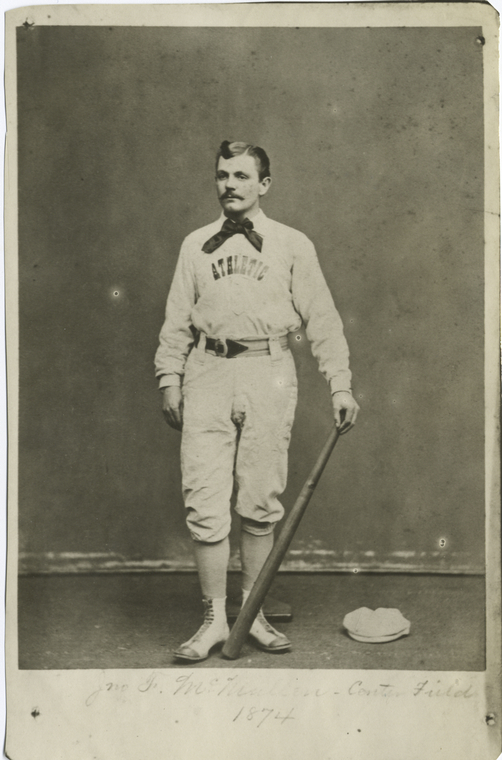
- Outfielder/Pitcher
- Born: April 1, 1849; Philadelphia, Pennsylvania, U.S.
- Died: April 11, 1881 (aged 32); Philadelphia, Pennsylvania, U.S.
- Batted: Right Threw: Left

MLB debut
- May 9, 1871, for the Troy Haymakers

Last MLB appearance
- October 25, 1875, for the Philadelphia White Stockings

MLB statistics
- Batting average: .284
- Home runs: 4
- Runs batted in: 135
- Win–loss record: 14–15
- Earned run average: 5.43
- Strikeouts: 15
- Stats at Baseball Reference

Teams
- National Association of Base Ball Players Keystone of Philadelphia (1867) Buckeye of Cincinnati (1868) Philadelphia Athletics (1869) Troy Haymakers (1870) National Association of Professional BBP Troy Haymakers (1871) New York Mutuals (1872) Philadelphia Athletics (1873–1874) Philadelphia White Stockings (1875)

John F. McMullin (April 1, 1849 – April 11, 1881) was an American professional baseball player. During the first professional league season in 1871, he was the only regular left-handed pitcher, while in later seasons he mainly played the outfield. After playing almost every game throughout the five National Association seasons (1871–1875), he did not play a single game in the National League that succeeded it. He died in his native Philadelphia five years later, only 32 years old.

== Early life and amateur career ==
McMullin was born on April 1, 1849, in Philadelphia, Pennsylvania.

In 1867 the 19-year-old McMullin was a regular outfielder for the Keystone club of Philadelphia in the nominally amateur National Association of Base Ball Players. Keystone fielded Philadelphia's second team by playing strength, behind the Athletics. Half the team scored more than three runs per game, including McMullin with 47 in 13 games now on record.

== Professional career ==
=== Early career ===
For the 1868 season, two Cincinnati clubs both acquired four or five players from the east; presumably they were compensated somehow. John McMullin joined the Buckeyes and played catcher more than any other position. Evidently the second-best team in the west, they proved (fatally) to be second-best in the city behind the Cincinnati Red Stockings, and did not survive to contest the first openly professional pennant race next season. McMullin returned to his native city, now to be catcher, pitcher, and shortstop for the supreme Athletics. He played 49 of 53 known games in 1869, the leading number, and held his own in the powerful lineup.

=== Troy Haymakers ===
For the 1870 season at age 21, McMullin became a regular pitcher for the Haymakers of Troy, New York, a pro team of average strength, with a powerful lineup but not much pitching. Although there was at least one other regular lefty pitcher on the professional teams of 1870 (Charlie Pabor of the Union of Morrisania), McMullin was the only regular left-hand pitcher in the 1871 National Association (the first pro league season). McMullin started all 29 games of the 1871 Troy Haymakers season and completed 28, including a game against the Philadelphia Athletics on June 28 which ended with a score of 49–33. In the slugfest, the Troy pitcher gave up all 49 Philadelphia runs (31 of which were earned) on 42 hits and seven walks, while striking out none. The lone game McMullin did not complete took place on September 5 against the Rockford Forest Citys, when he gave up 15 runs (nine earned) in the first eight innings and switched positions with shortstop Dickie Flowers for the ninth. In total, McMullin pitched 249 innings in 1871 and compiled a 12–15 won–lost record, a 5.53 earned run average, and 12 strikeouts. He gave up the most hits (430), walks (75), and earned runs (153) of any pitcher in the National Association. As a batter, he produced a .279 batting average with 32 runs batted in, and stole 11 bases. After this season, McMullin would be limited to occasional appearances as a pitcher.

=== New York Mutuals ===
In 1872, McMullin played for the New York Mutuals, mainly as a left fielder. In 54 games, his batting average sunk to .254, although he led the Mutuals in walks with 11. McMullin made 3 appearances at pitcher during the year, the first being a start on April 24 against the Washington Nationals, in New York's third game of the season. He pitched a complete game, gave up eight hits and seven runs (two earned) in nine innings, and was credited with the win. His next pitching appearance came on May 18, when he pitched the last four innings of a 24-6 rout against the Brooklyn Eckfords. Although the statistic did not exist then, McMullin was retroactively credited with the save, the only one of his career. His final appearance as a pitcher in 1872 came on June 8, on the other side of a lopsided game, as he entered with a 15-run deficit and pitched the last two innings of an eventual 19-0 loss to the Philadelphia Athletics. McMullin finished the season with a 3.60 ERA in 15 innings.

=== Philadelphia Athletics ===
In 1873, McMullin joined his hometown Philadelphia Athletics. Again playing mostly left field, he batted .273 with 28 RBIs and 9 stolen bases in 52 games. He made one appearance at pitcher, a complete game victory in which he pitched eight innings and allowed five runs (two earned) on ten hits and a walk.

McMullin remained with the Athletics in 1874. Playing mainly in center field, he hit a team-best .346, slugged 10 doubles, two triples, and the first two home runs of his career, scored 61 runs, and drove in 32. Besides batting average, he led the Athletics in hits (90), walks (8), on-base percentage (.366), and on-base plus slugging (.789). McMullin finished fifth in the league in batting average, and third in on-base percentage. However, his 13 strikeouts tied him with Johnny Ryan and Billy Barnie for the most by a batter.

Also in 1874, McMullin served as the home plate umpire for a game on October 19 between the Philadelphia White Stockings and the Boston Red Stockings.

=== Philadelphia White Stockings ===
In 1875, McMullin moved to the crosstown Philadelphia White Stockings. Although his batting average slipped to .257, he continued to hit for power, with nine doubles, four triples, and two home runs among his 57 hits. His two homers led the White Stockings, and his slugging percentage of .360 was second on the team, but he also led the team in times caught stealing, with 10, and strikeouts, with 12. After not pitching at all the prior year, McMullin made four relief appearances for the Whites, posting a 7.94 ERA in 11.1 innings.

=== Later career ===
Although McMullin did not play in the new National League in 1876, he umpired three games in Philadelphia during the season, on June 14, June 15, and July 21.

McMullin played for and managed a Philadelphia-based team in the League Alliance, baseball's first semi-affiliated minor league, in 1877.

== Death ==
McMullin died of pneumonia on April 11, 1881, in Philadelphia, and is buried there in Old Cathedral Cemetery.
