= 1872 Troy Haymakers season =

1872 Troy Haymakers
- League: National Association of Professional Base Ball Players
- Ballpark: Haymakers' Grounds
- City: Troy, New York
- Record: 15–10 (.600)
- League place: 5th
- Managers: Jimmy Wood

The Troy Haymakers played their final season in 1872 as a member of the National Association of Professional Base Ball Players. They finished fifth in the league with a record of 15–10.

== Regular season ==
=== Season standings ===
Pos	Team	Pld	W	L	T	RF	RA	RD	GB
1	Boston Red Stockings (C)	48	39	8	1	521	236	+285	—
2	Baltimore Canaries	58	35	19	4	617	434	+183	7.5
3	New York Mutuals	56	34	20	2	523	362	+161	8.5
4	Philadelphia Athletics	47	30	14	3	539	349	+190	7.5
5	Troy Haymakers	25	15	10	0	273	191	+82	13
6	Brooklyn Atlantics	37	9	28	0	237	473	−236	25
7	Cleveland Forest Citys	22	6	16	0	174	254	−80	20.5
8	Middletown Mansfields	24	5	19	0	220	348	−128	22.5
9	Brooklyn Eckfords	29	3	26	0	152	413	−261	27
10	Washington Olympics	9	2	7	0	54	140	−86	18
11	Washington Nationals	11	0	11	0	80	190	−110	21

Source: Baseball Reference
(C) Champions

=== Record vs. opponents ===
1872 National Association Records Sources:
Team	BAL	BOS	BRA	BRE	CLE	MID	NY	PHI	TRO	WSN	WSO
Baltimore	—	0–7	5–1	5–1	4–1	4–0	5–4–2	4–5–2	3–0	3–0	2–0
Boston	7–0	—	7–1	3–0	4–0	3–0	7–2	4–4–1	2–1	1–0	1–0
Brooklyn Atlantics	1–5	1–7	—	2–2	1–1	2–1	2–6	0–4	0–2	0–0	0–0
Brooklyn Eckfords	1–5	0–3	2–2	—	0–1	0–2	0–5	0–5	0–3	0–0	0–0
Cleveland	1–4	0–4	1–1	1–0	—	0–1	1–2	0–3	0–1	1–0	1–0
Middletown	0–4	0–3	1–2	2–0	1–0	—	0–4	0–2	0–4	1–0	0–0
New York	4–5–2	2–7	6–2	5–0	2–1	4–0	—	6–3	3–2	1–0	1–0
Philadelphia	5–4–2	4–4–1	4–0	5–0	3–0	2–0	3–6	—	2–0	1–0	1–0
Troy	0–3	1–2	2–0	3–0	1–0	4–0	2–3	0–2	—	1–0	1–0
Washington Nationals	0–3	0–1	0–0	0–0	0–1	0–1	0–1	0–1	0–1	—	0–2
Washington Olympics	0–2	0–1	0–0	0–0	0–1	0–0	0–1	0–1	0–1	2–0	—

=== Roster ===
1872 Troy Haymakers
Roster
Pitchers: George Zettlein	Catchers: Doug Allison; Infielders: Steve Bellán; Davy Force; Charlie Hodes; Bub McAtee; Jimmy Wood	Outfielders: Count Gedney; Marshall King; Steve King; Phonney Martin; Candy Nelson	Manager: Jimmy Wood

== Player stats ==
=== Batting ===
Note: G = Games played; AB = At bats; H = Hits; Avg. = Batting average; HR = Home runs; RBI = Runs batted in

Player	G	AB	H	Avg.	HR	RBI
Doug Allison	23	114	35	.307	0	20
Bub McAtee	25	126	28	.222	0	15
Jimmy Wood	25	113	38	.336	2	26
Steve Bellán	23	115	30	.261	0	17
Davy Force	25	130	53	.408	0	19
Count Gedney	9	47	20	.426	3	18
Phonney Martin	25	119	36	.303	0	14
Steve King	25	128	39	.305	0	20
Charlie Hodes	13	62	15	.242	0	10
Candy Nelson	4	20	7	.350	0	4
Marshall King	3	11	0	.000	0	1

=== Starting pitchers ===
Note: G = Games pitched, IP = Innings Pitched; W = Wins; L = Losses; ERA = Earned run average; SO = Strikeouts

Player	G	IP	W	L	ERA	SO
George Zettlein	25	187.2	14	8	2.16	17

==== Relief pitchers ====
Note: G = Games pitched; W = Wins; L = Losses; SV = Saves; ERA = Earned run average; SO = Strikeouts

Player	G	W	L	SV	ERA	SO
Phonney Martin	8	1	2	0	4.82	2
