= Charlie Hodes =

American baseball player (1848–1875)

- Catcher/Infielder/Outfielder
- Born: c. 1848; Manhattan, New York, U.S.
- Died: February 14, 1875 (aged 26–27); Brooklyn, New York, U.S.
- Batted: Unknown Threw: Right

National Association debut
- May 8, 1871, for the Chicago White Stockings

Last National Association appearance
- July 13, 1874, for the Brooklyn Atlantics

MLB statistics
- Batting average: .231
- Runs: 57
- Runs batted in: 42
- Stats at Baseball Reference

Teams
- National Association of Base Ball Players Brooklyn Eckfords (1868–1869) Chicago White Stockings (1870) National Association of Professional BBP Chicago White Stockings (1871) Troy Haymakers (1872) Brooklyn Atlantics (1874)

Charles Hodes (c. 1848 – February 14, 1875) was an American professional baseball player who played as a catcher, infielder, and outfielder in the National Association for three seasons from 1871 to 1874. A Brooklyn native, Hodes played one season each for the Chicago White Stockings, Troy Haymakers, and Brooklyn Atlantics. He had a career batting average of .231 in 63 total games before dying from tuberculosis in 1875.

== Early life ==
Hodes was born to German immigrants in Manhattan, New York, in about 1848, though the exact date of his birth is unknown. His family lived in Manhattan until about 1853, when they moved to Brooklyn. There, Hodes would eventually play baseball with multiple amateur teams.

== Amateur career ==
In 1868, Hodes joined the hometown Brooklyn Eckfords, playing for them in 1869 as well.

== Chicago White Stockings (1870–1871) ==
Hodes moved to Chicago before the 1870 season, and joined the city's first professional baseball team, the Chicago White Stockings.

The White Stockings claimed the national championship after defeating the powerful Cincinnati Red Stockings in October, although the rival New York Mutuals disputed that claim. Hodes is listed in an 1870 city directory: he lived at 101 Adams Street and his profession was simply "ball player."

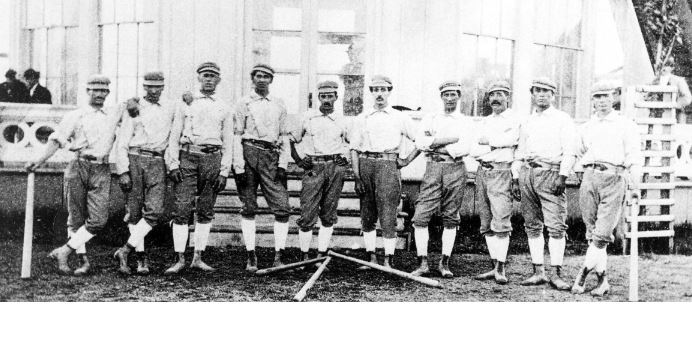
1870 Chicago White Stockings (later Cubs): (l-r) Ned Cuthbert, Fred Treacey, Charlie Hodes, Levi Meyerle, Ed Pinkham, Jimmy Wood, Bub McAtee, Bill Craver, Marshall King, Clipper Flynn

Hodes returned to the White Stockings in 1871, when the team joined the first all-professional league, the National Association. Hodes's first National Association game with Chicago came on May 8, against the Cleveland Forest Citys at the Union Base-Ball Grounds in Chicago. Playing catcher for the team, he had two hits, two runs scored, and two runs batted in (RBI) in Chicago's 14–12 victory. Though Hodes was Chicago's main catcher during the season, manager Jimmy Wood also used him as a third baseman, shortstop, and outfielder. The White Stockings' season was interrupted on October 8, when the Great Chicago Fire consumed their ballpark, uniforms, and equipment. Other teams loaned them supplies to finish the year, and they played the rest of their regularly scheduled games on the road. Despite these challenges, the White Stockings remained in contention for the league title until the final day of the season (October 30), when they faced the Philadelphia Athletics in a game that would determine the champion. Catching that day, Hode was hitless in three at bats as Philadelphia won 4–1. In 28 games in 1871, Hodes batted .277 with 32 runs scored, 36 hits, two home runs (the only ones of his career), and 25 RBI.

== Troy Haymakers (1872) ==
The White Stockings suspended operations after the 1871 season, but Wood was hired to manage the Troy Haymakers for 1872. He brought several of his Chicago players along, including George Zettlein, Bub McAtee, and Hodes. The catcher only appeared in 13 of the team's 25 games, but he continued to demonstrate his versatility by playing third base, shortstop, and outfield. In 13 games, Hodes batted .242 with 17 runs scored, 15 hits, and 10 RBI.

Hodes left the Haymakers in June 1872, and returned to Chicago. He joined a local amateur team called the Aetnas. Ironically, one of Hodes's first games with his new club was played on June 16, 1872, when the Haymakers came to Chicago to play an exhibition game at the newly built 23rd Street Grounds. Troy beat the Aetnas, 12-2.

Hodes eventually jumped to the Aetnas' cross-town rival, the Actives.

Hodes's decision to leave the Haymakers proved to be a wise one, since the club went broke and disbanded in late July 1872. Six of Troy's former players joined the Brooklyn Eckfords for the rest of the 1872 season, but Hodes was not signed by the team.

At some point, Hodes took a job with the Chicago Post Office. An 1873 city directory lists Hodes as a letter carrier living at 454 State Street. Two brief items in the Chicago Evening Post, published in April and May 1873, state that he had been named the captain of the post-office clerks' baseball club.

== Brooklyn Atlantics (1874) ==
In 1874, Hodes went back home to Brooklyn and joined the National Association's Brooklyn Atlantics. This time, he was used primarily as an outfielder, though he also played the positions of catcher, second base, and first base. However, Hodes battled fatigue throughout the year, which affected his performance on the field. On July 13, he was hitless in five at bats in a 6–4 victory over the Hartford Dark Blues at the Hartford Ball Club Grounds. After that game, manager Bob Ferguson decided his player needed rest and gave him the remainder of the season off. Though Hodes did not play any more games in 1874, he did umpire four contests, the last of these coming on October 3 when the Atlantics played the Baltimore Canaries. In 21 games, he batted .148 with eight runs scored, 12 hits, and seven RBI. His three-season totals in the NA included a .231 batting average, 57 runs scored, 63 hits, and 42 RBI in 62 games.

== Illness and death ==
Hodes's fatigue would only get worse over the offseason, as he was diagnosed with tuberculosis in mid-October. Ferguson held an exhibition game at the Union Grounds in Brooklyn on November 12 to raise funds for the player's recovery, and a benefit "hop" was held for him later that day, though the Brooklyn Eagle reported that the latter "was not so successful as might have been desired." Ferguson and Hodes's teammates also went to his house several times to encourage the ailing ballplayer. However, Hodes died of the disease on February 14, 1875. He is interred at Lutheran All Faiths Cemetery in Queens, New York.

== See also ==
- List of baseball players who died during their careers
