= 1872 Cleveland Forest Citys season =

1872 Cleveland Forest Citys
- League: National Association of Professional Base Ball Players
- Ballpark: National Association Grounds
- City: Cleveland, Ohio
- Record: 6–16 (.273)
- League place: 6th
- Managers: Scott Hastings and Deacon White

The Cleveland Forest Citys played their second and final season in 1872 as a member of the National Association of Professional Base Ball Players. They finished seventh in the league with a record of 6–16. The team folded at the conclusion of the season.

== Regular season ==
=== Season standings ===
Pos	Team	Pld	W	L	T	RF	RA	RD	GB
1	Boston Red Stockings (C)	48	39	8	1	521	236	+285	—
2	Baltimore Canaries	58	35	19	4	617	434	+183	7.5
3	New York Mutuals	56	34	20	2	523	362	+161	8.5
4	Philadelphia Athletics	47	30	14	3	539	349	+190	7.5
5	Troy Haymakers	25	15	10	0	273	191	+82	13
6	Brooklyn Atlantics	37	9	28	0	237	473	−236	25
7	Cleveland Forest Citys	22	6	16	0	174	254	−80	20.5
8	Middletown Mansfields	24	5	19	0	220	348	−128	22.5
9	Brooklyn Eckfords	29	3	26	0	152	413	−261	27
10	Washington Olympics	9	2	7	0	54	140	−86	18
11	Washington Nationals	11	0	11	0	80	190	−110	21

Source: Baseball Reference
(C) Champions

=== Record vs. opponents ===
1872 National Association Records Sources:
Team	BAL	BOS	BRA	BRE	CLE	MID	NY	PHI	TRO	WSN	WSO
Baltimore	—	0–7	5–1	5–1	4–1	4–0	5–4–2	4–5–2	3–0	3–0	2–0
Boston	7–0	—	7–1	3–0	4–0	3–0	7–2	4–4–1	2–1	1–0	1–0
Brooklyn Atlantics	1–5	1–7	—	2–2	1–1	2–1	2–6	0–4	0–2	0–0	0–0
Brooklyn Eckfords	1–5	0–3	2–2	—	0–1	0–2	0–5	0–5	0–3	0–0	0–0
Cleveland	1–4	0–4	1–1	1–0	—	0–1	1–2	0–3	0–1	1–0	1–0
Middletown	0–4	0–3	1–2	2–0	1–0	—	0–4	0–2	0–4	1–0	0–0
New York	4–5–2	2–7	6–2	5–0	2–1	4–0	—	6–3	3–2	1–0	1–0
Philadelphia	5–4–2	4–4–1	4–0	5–0	3–0	2–0	3–6	—	2–0	1–0	1–0
Troy	0–3	1–2	2–0	3–0	1–0	4–0	2–3	0–2	—	1–0	1–0
Washington Nationals	0–3	0–1	0–0	0–0	0–1	0–1	0–1	0–1	0–1	—	0–2
Washington Olympics	0–2	0–1	0–0	0–0	0–1	0–0	0–1	0–1	0–1	2–0	—

=== Roster ===
1872 Cleveland Forest Citys
Roster
Pitchers: Al Pratt	Catchers: Scott Hastings; Deacon White; Infielders: Jim Carleton; Jim Holdsworth; Joe Simmons; Ezra Sutton; Charlie Sweasy	Outfielders: Art Allison; Martin Mullen; Charlie Pabor; Rynie Wolters	Manager: Scott Hastings; Deacon White

== Player stats ==
=== Batting ===
Note: G = Games played; AB = At bats; H = Hits; Avg. = Batting average; HR = Home runs; RBI = Runs batted in

Player	G	AB	H	Avg.	HR	RBI
Deacon White	22	109	37	.339	0	22
Joe Simmons	18	90	23	.256	0	9
Charlie Sweasy	12	57	16	.281	0	6
Jim Holdsworth	22	110	33	.300	0	11
Ezra Sutton	22	107	30	.280	0	10
Scott Hastings	22	115	45	.391	0	16
Art Allison	19	87	23	.264	0	8
Charlie Pabor	21	92	19	.207	0	7
Jim Carleton	7	38	12	.316	0	4
Martin Mullen	1	4	0	.000	0	0

=== Starting pitchers ===
Note: G = Games pitched; IP = Innings pitched; W = Wins; L = Losses; ERA = Earned run average; SO = Strikeouts

Player	G	IP	W	L	ERA	SO
Al Pratt	15	105.2	2	9	5.79	7
Rynie Wolters	12	75.1	3	6	6.09	4
Charlie Pabor	2	18.0	1	1	4.00	0
