= 1872 Middletown Mansfields season =

1872 Middletown Mansfields
- League: National Association of Professional Base Ball Players
- Ballpark: Mansfield Club Grounds
- City: Middletown, Connecticut
- Record: 5–19 (.208)
- League place: 8th
- Owners: Ben Douglas, Jr.
- Managers: John Clapp

The Middletown Mansfields played their first and only season in 1872 as a member of the National Association of Professional Base Ball Players. They finished eighth in the league with a record of 5–19.

== Regular season ==
=== Season standings ===
Pos	Team	Pld	W	L	T	RF	RA	RD	GB
1	Boston Red Stockings (C)	48	39	8	1	521	236	+285	—
2	Baltimore Canaries	58	35	19	4	617	434	+183	7.5
3	New York Mutuals	56	34	20	2	523	362	+161	8.5
4	Philadelphia Athletics	47	30	14	3	539	349	+190	7.5
5	Troy Haymakers	25	15	10	0	273	191	+82	13
6	Brooklyn Atlantics	37	9	28	0	237	473	−236	25
7	Cleveland Forest Citys	22	6	16	0	174	254	−80	20.5
8	Middletown Mansfields	24	5	19	0	220	348	−128	22.5
9	Brooklyn Eckfords	29	3	26	0	152	413	−261	27
10	Washington Olympics	9	2	7	0	54	140	−86	18
11	Washington Nationals	11	0	11	0	80	190	−110	21

Source: Baseball Reference
(C) Champions

=== Record vs. opponents ===
1872 National Association Records Sources:
Team	BAL	BOS	BRA	BRE	CLE	MID	NY	PHI	TRO	WSN	WSO
Baltimore	—	0–7	5–1	5–1	4–1	4–0	5–4–2	4–5–2	3–0	3–0	2–0
Boston	7–0	—	7–1	3–0	4–0	3–0	7–2	4–4–1	2–1	1–0	1–0
Brooklyn Atlantics	1–5	1–7	—	2–2	1–1	2–1	2–6	0–4	0–2	0–0	0–0
Brooklyn Eckfords	1–5	0–3	2–2	—	0–1	0–2	0–5	0–5	0–3	0–0	0–0
Cleveland	1–4	0–4	1–1	1–0	—	0–1	1–2	0–3	0–1	1–0	1–0
Middletown	0–4	0–3	1–2	2–0	1–0	—	0–4	0–2	0–4	1–0	0–0
New York	4–5–2	2–7	6–2	5–0	2–1	4–0	—	6–3	3–2	1–0	1–0
Philadelphia	5–4–2	4–4–1	4–0	5–0	3–0	2–0	3–6	—	2–0	1–0	1–0
Troy	0–3	1–2	2–0	3–0	1–0	4–0	2–3	0–2	—	1–0	1–0
Washington Nationals	0–3	0–1	0–0	0–0	0–1	0–1	0–1	0–1	0–1	—	0–2
Washington Olympics	0–2	0–1	0–0	0–0	0–1	0–0	0–1	0–1	0–1	2–0	—

=== Roster ===
1872 Middletown Mansfields
Roster
Pitchers: Cy Bentley	Catchers: John Clapp; Infielders: Eddie Booth; Asa Brainard; George Fields; Tim Murnane; Jim O'Rourke	Outfielders: Ham Allen; Billy Arnold; Frank Buttery; Frank McCarton; Jim Tipper	Manager: John Clapp

== Player stats ==
=== Batting ===
Note: G = Games played; AB = At bats; H = Hits; Avg. = Batting average; HR = Home runs; RBI = Runs batted in

Player	G	AB	H	Avg.	HR	RBI
John Clapp	19	97	27	.278	1	16
Tim Murnane	23	114	41	.360	0	16
Eddie Booth	24	116	37	.319	0	15
Jim O'Rourke	23	99	27	.273	0	16
George Fields	18	86	19	.221	0	14
Ham Allen	17	70	19	.271	0	11
Frank McCarton	19	82	25	.305	0	12
Jim Tipper	24	110	29	.264	0	18
Frank Buttery	18	93	20	.215	0	7
Asa Brainard	6	25	5	.200	0	1
Billy Arnold	2	7	1	.143	0	0

=== Starting pitchers ===
Note: G = Games pitched; IP = Innings pitched; W = Wins; L = Losses; ERA = Earned run average; SO = Strikeouts

Player	G	IP	W	L	ERA	SO
Cy Bentley	18	144.0	2	15	6.06	5
Asa Brainard	2	8.0	0	2	5.63	0

==== Relief pitchers ====
Note: G = Games pitched; W = Wins; L = Losses; SV = Saves; ERA = Earned run average; SO = Strikeouts

Player	G	W	L	SV	ERA	SO
Frank Buttery	8	3	2	0	4.27	5
