= Scott Hastings (baseball) =

American baseball player and manager (1847–1907)

- Catcher / Outfielder
- Born: August 10, 1847; Hillsboro, Ohio, U.S.
- Died: August 14, 1907 (aged 60); Sawtelle, California, U.S.
- Batted: Right Threw: Right

Major-league debut
- May 6, 1871, for the Rockford Forest Citys

Last major-league appearance
- September 1, 1877, for the Cincinnati Reds

Major-league statistics
- Batting average: .279
- Home runs: 0
- Runs batted in: 139
- Managerial record: 10–35
- Winning %: .222
- Stats at Baseball Reference

Teams
- As player: Rockford Forest Citys (1869–1871); Cleveland Forest Citys (1872); Baltimore Canaries (1872–1873); Hartford Dark Blues (1874); Chicago White Stockings (1875); Louisville Grays (1876); Cincinnati Reds (1877); As manager: Rockford Forest Citys (1871); Cleveland Forest Citys (1872)

Winfield Scott Hastings (August 10, 1847 – August 14, 1907) was an American baseball player and manager in the late 19th century. Primarily a catcher and outfielder, Hastings also appeared as a first baseman, second baseman, and shortstop over the course of his career.

== Early life and amateur career ==
Hastings was born in Hillsboro, Ohio, the son of a wagon maker. He was named after U.S. Army General Winfield Scott. Hastings enlisted in the 145th Illinois Infantry Regiment in 1864 at 18 years old. He was a member of the Rockford Forest Citys in 1869, when he led amateur players in runs, hits, and scoring average, and he served as the Forest Citys team captain in 1869 and 1870. Hastings is listed in the 1870 census working as a hotel clerk in Rockford.

== Professional career ==
=== Rockford Forest Citys (1871) ===
Prior to joining the 1871 Forest Citys, Hastings played for the independent Lone Star club of New Orleans, including in an exhibition game on April 16, 1871, against the Chicago White Stockings. He made his major league debut with the Forest Citys on May 6, in the process violating a league rule which disallowed players from playing for National Association teams within 60 days of leaving their previous club. After the season, Rockford's four wins during that period, including a June 15 victory over the Philadelphia Athletics that came just a day before Hastings would have been eligible to play, were changed to forfeit losses. This dropped the team's record, and Hastings' managerial record, from 8–17 to 4–21. Since two of Rockford's four forfeits came against the league champion Athletics, who finished just two games in front of the Boston Red Stockings, Hastings had an outsize impact on the 1871 pennant race. In terms of personal statistics, he had 30 hits, including six doubles and four triples, in 118 at bats for an "unspectacular" .254 batting average, along with 27 runs scored, 20 RBI, and 11 stolen bases.

=== Cleveland Forest Citys (1872) ===
After the Rockford Forest Citys disbanded at the end of 1871, Hastings joined the Cleveland Forest Citys in 1872, again as player-manager. However, he lost the job of manager to Deacon White after the team played poorly, especially defensively, on an abortive eastern road trip in May. Rotating between catcher, second base and the outfield, Hastings was batting .391 when the Forest Citys folded on August 19. He and Jim Holdsworth were the only two Cleveland players who were signed by other teams for the remainder of the season.

=== Baltimore Canaries (1872–1873) ===
Hastings moved to the Baltimore Canaries to finish out the 1872 season, where he primarily caught, and hit .306. His .362 batting average for the entire season was Hastings' career high.

Hastings remained with the Canaries for the 1873 season, and batted .281 while rotating with two other players (Cal McVey and Bill Craver) at the catching position, as well as filling in as a fourth outfielder. In one October victory over the Brooklyn Atlantics, he tallied six hits and scored seven runs.

=== Hartford Dark Blues (1874) ===
The Hartford Dark Blues signed Hastings in advance of the 1874 season, in part due to his familiarity with pitcher Cherokee Fisher. For the Dark Blues, Hastings once again split time at catcher and played mainly in the outfield when not behind the plate. He recorded 80 hits, including 11 doubles, in 247 at bats for a .325 batting average, and led the team in runs scored with 60.

=== Chicago White Stockings (1875) ===
Hastings changed teams again for 1875, joining the Chicago White Stockings after a tryout during which he demonstrated he could catch the fastball of Jim Devlin. He played an important role in a 1-0 extra inning victory over his former club Hartford on June 19, first making a running catch in right field with the bases loaded in the top of the eighth inning, then hitting a leadoff single in the bottom of the 11th which led to the game-winning run. Although Hastings was subsequently put out on a fielder's choice groundout by Devlin, Hartford pitcher Candy Cummings stated that the subsequent throw to first hit Hastings, which caused the baseball to go into the stands, allowing Devlin to get to third base, from which he eventually scored.

Hastings was the regular catcher for Chicago, but his average fell to .254, and although he stole 13 bases, he led the league with 11 times caught stealing. After the season, White Stockings owner William Hulbert found Hastings expendable, and signed his former teammate Deacon White from the Boston Red Stockings to replace him.

=== Louisville Grays (1876) ===
Hastings caught on with the Louisville Grays for the baseball year season in the new National League. He transitioned from primarily playing catcher to being the everyday center fielder for the Grays. Hastings posted a .258 batting average for the season, and did not re-sign with Louisville. According to the Chicago Tribune, this was at least in part because Hastings was not considered a team player.

=== Guelph Maple Leafs (1877) ===
No National League team attempted to sign Hastings before the 1877 season, so he began the year playing for the Guelph Maple Leafs of the International Association for Professional Base Ball Players. From May 17 to June 21, Hastings appeared in eight games with the Canadian club, during which he hit .138 and scored two runs.

=== Cincinnati Reds (1877) ===
On July 3, 1877, Hastings was signed by the Cincinnati Reds, who had briefly disbanded and lost some of their players to other teams. He caught 20 games for the Reds, the largest number out of the six men who played catcher for the team that season. Hastings batted only .141 for the season, his last in the majors.

== Personal life and death ==
Hastings had gotten married by 1874.

After retiring from baseball, Hastings worked as a clerk for A.T. Stewart and Company in Chicago. He eventually moved to Santa Cruz, California, where he worked at various times for an electric company, as a box maker, and as a laborer in a powder mill. He died of stomach cancer at the Sawtelle Veterans Home in 1907.
