= Bases on balls per nine innings pitched =

Baseball statistic

In baseball statistics, bases on balls per nine innings pitched (BB/9IP or BB/9) or walks per nine innings (denoted by W/9) is the average number of bases on balls, (or walks) given up by a pitcher per nine innings pitched. It is determined by multiplying the number of bases on balls allowed by nine, and dividing by the number of innings pitched. It is a measure of the bases on balls ability of a pitcher.

== Leaders ==
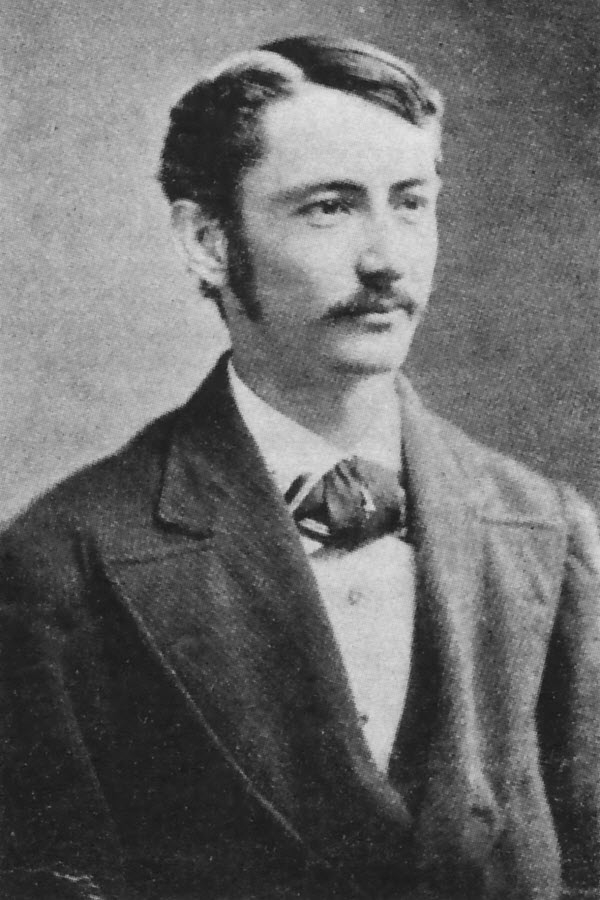
Candy Cummings, all-time career leader in BB/9IP

All but one of the top 25 single-season leaders in BB/9IP through 2018 pitched in the period of 1876–84. George Zettlein was the all-time single-season leader (0.2308 in 1876), followed by Cherokee Fisher (0.2355 in 1876) and George Bradley (0.2755 in 1880). The highest single-season modern day baseball performance was by Carlos Silva (0.4301 in 2005).

The all-time career leaders in BB/9IP through 2022 were Candy Cummings (0.4731), Tommy Bond (0.4787), and Al Spalding (0.5114), all of whom played in the 1870s and 1880s.

The active career leaders in BB/9IP through 2022 were Corey Kluber (1.9683), Michael Pineda (1.9719), and Hyun Jin Ryu (1.9914).
