= Ed Pinkham =

Ed Pinkham may refer to:

- Ed Pinkham (baseball) (1846–1906), Major League Baseball infielder
- Ed Pinkham (American football) (born 1953), American college football coach
