= 1872 Brooklyn Atlantics season =

1872 Brooklyn Atlantics
- League: National Association of Professional Base Ball Players
- Ballpark: Capitoline Grounds
- City: Brooklyn, New York
- Record: 9–28 (.243)
- League place: 6th
- Managers: Bob Ferguson

The Brooklyn Atlantics played their first season of professional baseball in 1872 as a member of the National Association of Professional Base Ball Players, following many successful years as an amateur team. They finished sixth in the league with a record of 9–28.

== Regular season ==
=== Season standings ===
Pos	Team	Pld	W	L	T	RF	RA	RD	GB
1	Boston Red Stockings (C)	48	39	8	1	521	236	+285	—
2	Baltimore Canaries	58	35	19	4	617	434	+183	7.5
3	New York Mutuals	56	34	20	2	523	362	+161	8.5
4	Philadelphia Athletics	47	30	14	3	539	349	+190	7.5
5	Troy Haymakers	25	15	10	0	273	191	+82	13
6	Brooklyn Atlantics	37	9	28	0	237	473	−236	25
7	Cleveland Forest Citys	22	6	16	0	174	254	−80	20.5
8	Middletown Mansfields	24	5	19	0	220	348	−128	22.5
9	Brooklyn Eckfords	29	3	26	0	152	413	−261	27
10	Washington Olympics	9	2	7	0	54	140	−86	18
11	Washington Nationals	11	0	11	0	80	190	−110	21

Source: Baseball Reference
(C) Champions

=== Record vs. opponents ===
1872 National Association Records Sources:
Team	BAL	BOS	BRA	BRE	CLE	MID	NY	PHI	TRO	WSN	WSO
Baltimore	—	0–7	5–1	5–1	4–1	4–0	5–4–2	4–5–2	3–0	3–0	2–0
Boston	7–0	—	7–1	3–0	4–0	3–0	7–2	4–4–1	2–1	1–0	1–0
Brooklyn Atlantics	1–5	1–7	—	2–2	1–1	2–1	2–6	0–4	0–2	0–0	0–0
Brooklyn Eckfords	1–5	0–3	2–2	—	0–1	0–2	0–5	0–5	0–3	0–0	0–0
Cleveland	1–4	0–4	1–1	1–0	—	0–1	1–2	0–3	0–1	1–0	1–0
Middletown	0–4	0–3	1–2	2–0	1–0	—	0–4	0–2	0–4	1–0	0–0
New York	4–5–2	2–7	6–2	5–0	2–1	4–0	—	6–3	3–2	1–0	1–0
Philadelphia	5–4–2	4–4–1	4–0	5–0	3–0	2–0	3–6	—	2–0	1–0	1–0
Troy	0–3	1–2	2–0	3–0	1–0	4–0	2–3	0–2	—	1–0	1–0
Washington Nationals	0–3	0–1	0–0	0–0	0–1	0–1	0–1	0–1	0–1	—	0–2
Washington Olympics	0–2	0–1	0–0	0–0	0–1	0–0	0–1	0–1	0–1	2–0	—

=== Roster ===
1872 Brooklyn Atlantics
Roster
Pitchers: Jim Britt; Catchers: Tom Barlow	Infielders: Edward Beavens; Jack Burdock; Denny Clare; Herman Dehlman; Bob Ferguson; John Galvin; Jim Hall; John Kenney; Charlie Lowe	Outfielders: John Barrett; John Bass; Eddie Booth; Oliver Brown; Herm Doscher; Higby; Sam Jackson; Jack McDonald; Jack Remsen; Al Thake; Herb Worth	Managers: Bob Ferguson

== Player stats ==
=== Batting ===
Note: G = Games played; AB = At bats; H = Hits; Avg. = Batting average; HR = Home runs; RBI = Runs batted in

Player	G	AB	H	Avg.	HR	RBI
Jack Burdock	37	174	47	.270	0	14
Tom Barlow	37	171	54	.316	0	8
Jack Remsen	37	165	39	.236	1	14
Herman Dehlman	37	164	37	.226	0	1
Bob Ferguson	37	164	46	.280	0	19
Al Thake	18	78	23	.295	0	15
Jack McDonald	15	62	16	.258	0	4
Eddie Booth	15	62	19	.306	0	7
Jim Hall	13	57	18	.316	0	6
Edward Beavens	10	43	9	.209	0	2
John Barrett	8	34	7	.206	0	2
Charlie Lowe	7	31	5	.161	0	3
Herm Doscher	6	24	9	.375	0	5
John Kenney	5	19	0	.000	0	1
Oliver Brown	4	15	2	.133	0	0
Sam Jackson	4	12	2	.167	0	0
Denny Clare	2	7	1	.143	0	0
John Bass	2	7	1	.143	0	1
Herb Worth	1	5	1	.200	0	1
Higby	1	4	0	.000	0	0
John Galvin	1	4	0	.000	0	0

=== Starting pitchers ===
Note: G = Games pitched; IP = Innings Pitched; W = Wins; L = Losses; ERA = Earned run average; SO = Strikeouts

Player	G	IP	W	L	ERA	SO
Jim Britt	37	336.0	9	28	4.53	13
