= Val Robinson =

Val Robinson is the name of

- Val Robinson (baseball) (1848–1898), Major League Baseball player
- Val Robinson (athlete) (born 1940), New Zealand middle-distance runner in 1969 Pacific Conference Games
- Val Robinson (field hockey) (1941–2022), English hockey player
