= John Galvin =

John Galvin may refer to:

- John Galvin (Irish politician) (1907–1963), Irish Fianna Fáil politician
- John Galvin (general) (1929–2015), American general
- John Galvin (baseball) (1842–1904), baseball player for the Brooklyn Atlantics
- John Galvin (linebacker) (born 1965), American football linebacker
- John Galvin (quarterback) (1920–1998), American football quarterback
- John Galvin (Gaelic footballer) (born 1980), Gaelic footballer from County Limerick
- John Galvin (hurler) (born 1953), Irish retired hurler
