= Asa Brainard =

American baseball player (1841–1888)

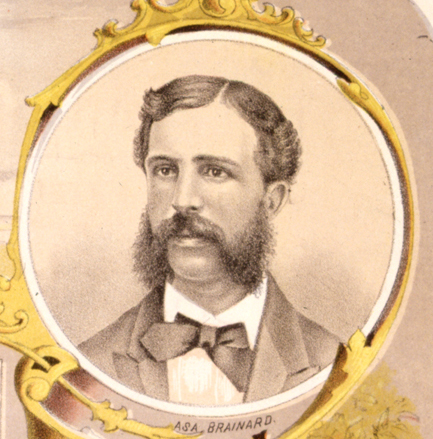
- Pitcher
- Born: c. 1841; Albany, New York, U.S.
- Died: December 29, 1888 (aged 46–47); Denver, Colorado, U.S.
- Batted: Unknown Threw: Right

MLB debut
- May 5, 1871, for the Washington Olympics

Last MLB appearance
- October 14, 1874, for the Baltimore Canaries

MLB statistics
- Win–loss record: 24–53
- Earned run average: 4.40
- Strikeouts: 25
- Stats at Baseball Reference

Teams
- National Association of Base Ball Players Excelsior of Brooklyn (1860–1866) Washington Nationals (1867) Cincinnati Red Stockings (1868–1870) National Association of Professional BBP Washington Olympics (1871–1872) Middletown Mansfields (1872) Baltimore Canaries (1873–1874)

Asahel "Asa" Brainard (c. 1841 – December 29, 1888), nicknamed "Count", was the ace pitcher of the original Cincinnati Red Stockings, the first fully professional baseball team, after having pitched for the Excelsior club of Brooklyn, New York.

== Early career ==
Born about 1841 in Albany, New York, Brainard played outfield and second base for the mighty Excelsiors of Brooklyn in 1860. Led by the sensational teenage fast pitcher, Jim Creighton, the team toured New York state from Albany to Buffalo, a major event in the baseball boom. The Civil War curtailed that; after playing 21 matches in 1860, the Excelsiors played none in 1861 and only a few in 1862. Following Creighton's premature death, Brainard succeeded him as the regular pitcher and remained in that role for four seasons. The Excelsiors played a heavy schedule again in 1866, the first full peacetime season, winning 13 of 20 games—a strong team but no longer a threat to the strongest. Young Candy Cummings, one inventor of the curveball, evidently won the pitcher's job by the end of the season.

Creighton biographer Thomas Gilbert points out that three of the preeminent pitchers of the amateur era, Creighton, Brainard, and Cummings, were each mentored and caught by one man, Excelsior veteran catcher Joseph "Joe" Leggett. While acknowledging that Leggett was an exceptionally talented catcher and developer of pitching talent, Gilbert has chronicled countless misdeeds by Leggett, who was a compulsive gambler, including the likely throwing of the 1860 National Association championship series between the Excelsior and the Brooklyn Atlantic.

In 1867 the National club of Washington completed the first western tour, playing ten games from Ohio to Missouri during three weeks in July. Brainard probably joined the team in the fall, in time for a shorter tour from Troy, New York to Philadelphia, where the strongest teams were based.

== Cincinnati ==
At 27 years old, he moved to Cincinnati for the 1868 season where he shared second base and pitcher with manager Harry Wright. Open professionalism was one year away but the long move suggests that Brainard was somehow compensated by club members if not by the club. Cincinnati fielded a strong team that year, with five of the famous team already in place.

When the NABBP permitted professionalism, the Red Stockings hired five incumbents including Brainard and five new men to complete its famous Nine, the first team on salary for a season. In their 1869 campaign, Asa Brainard pitched more than 70% of the innings, Harry Wright more than 25%, as the team toured the continent undefeated, vanquishing all of the plausible challengers. With Charlie Sweasy ensconced at second, the two pitchers now shared center field.

The Red Stockings toured again in 1870, with Brainard pitching almost 70% of the innings in 74 games. Occasionally beaten this year, the team may have been the strongest again, but the club dropped professional baseball in the fall.

== National Association ==
Harry Wright was hired to organize a new team in Boston, where he signed three teammates for 1871, also bringing along the "Red Stockings" designation. The other five regulars including Asa Brainard and catcher Doug Allison signed with Nick Young's Washington Olympics, an established club that also joined the new, entirely professional National Association (NA). The five former Red Stockings led the Olympics to a respectable finish in the inaugural NA season. Brainard's published "career statistics" begin with this year.

Later, Brainard played from 1871 to 1874 for the Washington Olympics, Middletown Mansfields, and Baltimore Canaries, all teams in the National Association.

Brainard died of pneumonia in Denver, Colorado at age 47, only a few months after John Bass at age 40, the first major league ballplayer to die in that city. Owing to its dry climate and relative convenience, Denver had become a destination for people suffering from tuberculosis. He is buried in Green-Wood Cemetery, Brooklyn.

== Notes ==
- Career statistics from Baseball Reference · Retrosheet
- Overfield, Joseph (1989). "Asa Brainard (Count)". Nineteenth Century Stars. Edited by Robert L. Tiemann and Mark Rucker. Kansas City, MO: SABR. ISBN 0-910137-35-8
- Retrosheet. "Asa Brainard". Retrieved 2006-08-29.
- Wright, Marshall (2000). The National Association of Base Ball Players, 1857–1870. Jefferson, NC: McFarland & Co. ISBN 0-7864-0779-4.
