= Charlie Sweasy =

American baseball player (1847–1908)

- Second baseman
- Born: November 2, 1847; Newark, New Jersey, U.S.
- Died: March 30, 1908 (aged 60); Newark, New Jersey, U.S.
- Batted: Right Threw: Right

MLB debut
- May 19, 1871, for the Washington Olympics

Last MLB appearance
- September 30, 1878, for the Providence Grays

MLB statistics
- Batting average: .194
- Home runs: 0
- Runs batted in: 39
- Stats at Baseball Reference

Teams
- National Association of Base Ball Players Irvington of Irvington, NJ (1866–1867) Buckeye of Cincinnati (1868) Cincinnati Red Stockings (1869–1870) League player Washington Olympics (1871) Cleveland Forest Citys (1872) Boston Red Stockings (1873) Baltimore Canaries (1874) Brooklyn Atlantics (1874) St. Louis Red Stockings (1875) Cincinnati Reds (1876) Providence Grays (1878) League manager St. Louis Red Stockings (1875)

Charles James Sweasy (November 2, 1847 – March 30, 1908), born Swasey, was an American second baseman for the original Cincinnati Red Stockings, the first fully professional baseball team. He returned to Cincinnati in 1876, hired by the new club that was a charter member of the National League. In the meantime he played for six teams during the five seasons of the National Association, so he may be considered one of the first "journeyman" ballplayers. A right-handed thrower and batter, he almost exclusively played second base.

Born 1847 in Newark, New Jersey, Sweasy's debut with a "major" team was in 1866 with the New Jersey Irvingtons that hailed from Irvington, New Jersey about 20 miles inland. Irvington was a new member of the National Association of Base Ball Players, with many other clubs as the association tripled in size to more than 90 in its first post-war season. The Irvingtons frightened the champion Brooklyn Atlantics by winning their first meeting on June 14 and losing their third one only in extra innings on October 29. Several team members would later play professionally including Sweasy and Andy Leonard, also of Newark.

== Cincinnati ==
For 1868 Sweasy and Leonard moved to Cincinnati and joined the Buckeyes, the chief local rival of the Red Stockings; the move suggests that they were somehow compensated by club members if not by the club.

When the NABBP permitted professionalism for 1869, Sweasy and Leonard were two of five new men hired to complete the First Nine of the Cincinnati Red Stockings, the first team on salary for a season. All had previously played in the infield, with Harry Wright and Asa Brainard sharing pitcher and second base for Cincinnati. Wright put Sweasy at second and made center field the position shared by the two pitchers.

Sweasy earned $800 for the eight-month season, March 15 to November 15. That was the standard rate with four men earning more. Years later, the son of club officer George Ellard recalled the skills of each player in words of praise. Ellard (1908: 100) covered Sweasy in the field and only in the field, with most attention to his grasp of flies to short center and right, where he was "one of the surest catchers of high fly balls to be found." The limited statistical record suggests that he fit comfortably in the supporting cast during the Red Stockings innings, hitting a little less frequently than team average, with a few more extra bases on hits. In two years, he played all but one of 130 games in the record books, one of six who played essentially without interruption.

Cincinnati toured the continent undefeated in 1869 and may have been the strongest team in 1870, but the club dropped professional baseball after the second season.

== 1871 ==
Wright was hired to organize a new team in Boston, where he signed three teammates for 1871. The other five regulars including Charlie Sweasy signed with Nick Young's Washington Olympics, an established club that also joined the new, entirely professional National Association (NA).

The Olympics appointed Sweasy captain, meaning that he would have many duties of a modern field manager, speaking for the team during the game and making many internal decisions. Unfortunately, he missed two long stretches of the season with illness, barely playing and so barely "managing". Two other transplants, Asa Brainard and Fred Waterman, acted as captains in his absence.

Charlie Sweasy played almost every game during his five NABBP seasons, through 1870 and age 22. Then he played only occasionally for five teams in four NA seasons. His batting record during those years and thereafter is unusually weak, suggesting that his skills were left behind by competitive improvement in the game or weakened by illness and forced idleness.

Sweasy returned to a regular playing role and earned his manager's credit in 1875 when he captained the lesser of two St. Louis clubs that joined the NA; the "Reds" dropped out after 19 games, overmatched. Next year he returned to Cincinnati as the second baseman of a new club that was a charter member of the National League. Probably he was hired by old teammate Charlie Gould, the first baseman and manager. His major league career ended two years later as regular second baseman for the new Providence Grays. Apparently, he was a marginal "major leaguer", able to hold a regular job at that level only for teams on the way in and teams on the way out.

Sweasy died in 1908 in his native Newark, age 60 years, and is interred at Evergreen Cemetery, Hillside, New Jersey.
