= John Galvin (baseball) =

American baseball player (1842–1904)

- Second baseman
- Born: August 1842; New York City, United States
- Died: April 20, 1904 (aged 61); Brooklyn, New York
- Batted: Unknown Threw: Unknown

MLB debut
- May 7, 1872, for the Brooklyn Atlantics

Last MLB appearance
- May 7, 1872, for the Brooklyn Atlantics

MLB statistics
- Batting average: .000
- Runs scored: 0
- RBIs: 0
- Stats at Baseball Reference

Teams
- National Association of Base Ball Players: Exercise of Brooklyn (1861); Brooklyn Atlantics (1863–1867); New York Mutuals (1868); National Association of Professional BBP: Brooklyn Atlantics (1872)

John A. Galvin (August 1842 – April 20, 1904) was an American baseball player who played one professional game for the Brooklyn Atlantics of the National Association of Professional Base Ball Players (NAPBBP) in 1872.

== Baseball career ==
Galvin began playing baseball in 1861, as a member of Exercise of Brooklyn. He joined the Brooklyn Atlantics in 1863, where, as the second baseman, he formed part of an infield which also included future professionals Dickey Pearce and Joe Start. In 1868, Galvin played for the New York Mutuals.

According to a 1900 New York Clipper article, Galvin was among the first hitters to lay down a bunt.

=== Professional game ===
Galvin returned to baseball to play a single game with the 1872 Brooklyn Atlantics. In the contest, a 23–3 loss to the Boston Red Stockings, he had no hits in four at bats and made four errors in five fielding chances.

== Personal life ==
Galvin joined the 51st New York Infantry Regiment in September 1861, but was discharged the next month. Later in life, he worked for the city works department as a sewer inspector, and he was listed as the keeper of a truants home in the 1880 United States census.

Galvin died in Brooklyn on April 20, 1904, and was buried in Holy Cross Cemetery, Brooklyn.
