= Ace (baseball) =

Baseball term for the primary starting pitcher in a pitching rotation

In baseball, an ace is a starting pitcher considered the best pitcher on a team's starting rotation. Barring injury or exceptional circumstances, a team's ace typically starts on Opening Day. In addition, aces are usually preferred to start crucial playoff games, sometimes on three days' rest.

The term may be a derivation of the nickname of Asa Brainard (real first name: "Asahel"), a 19th-century star pitcher, who was sometimes referred to as "Ace".

In the early days of baseball, the term ace was used to refer to a run.

Modern baseball analysts and fans have started using the term ace to refer to the elite pitchers in the game, not necessarily to the best starting pitcher on each team. For example, the April 27, 1981, Sports Illustrated cover was captioned "The Amazing A's and Their Five Aces" to describe the starting rotation of the 1981 Oakland Athletics, which featured Mike Norris, Rick Langford, Matt Keough, Steve McCatty, and Brian Kingman. Additional examples of teams described as having several aces were the Atlanta Braves from 1993 to 1996, featuring Tom Glavine, Greg Maddux, and John Smoltz, the 2011 Philadelphia Phillies, which featured Roy Halladay, Cliff Lee, Cole Hamels, and Roy Oswalt, and the 2025 Los Angeles Dodgers, which featured a late-season and postseason rotation of Blake Snell, Yoshinobu Yamamoto, Tyler Glasnow, and Shohei Ohtani.
