= George Fields (baseball) =

American baseball player (1852–1933)

- Third baseman
- Born: July 26, 1852; Waterbury, Connecticut, U.S.
- Died: September 22, 1933 (aged 81); Waterbury, Connecticut, U.S.
- Batted: Unknown Threw: Unknown

Major-league debut
- May 2, 1872, for the Middletown Mansfields

Last major-league appearance
- August 9, 1872, for the Middletown Mansfields

Major-league statistics
- Games played: 18
- Batting average: .241
- Hits: 21
- Stats at Baseball Reference

Teams
- National Association of Base Ball Players Middletown Mansfields (1870) National Association of Professional BBP Middletown Mansfields (1872)

George S. Fields was an American professional baseball player who played as a third baseman during the 1872 season for the Middletown Mansfields in the National Association.
