= List of Major League Baseball career ERA leaders =

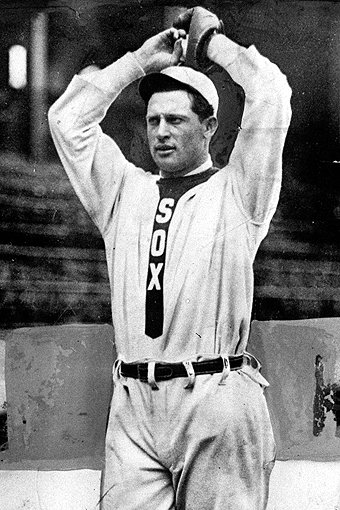
Ed Walsh, the career leader in earned run average.

In baseball statistics, earned run average (ERA) is the mean of earned runs given up by a pitcher per nine innings pitched (i.e., the traditional length of a game). It is calculated by dividing the number of earned runs allowed by the number of innings pitched and multiplying by nine. Runs resulting from defensive errors (including pitchers' defensive errors) are recorded as unearned runs and are not used to determine earned run average.

This is a list of the top 100 players in career earned run average, who have thrown at least 1,000 innings.

Ed Walsh holds the major league earned run average record at 1.816. Addie Joss (1.887) and Jim Devlin (1.896) are the only other pitchers with a career earned run average under 2.000.

== Key ==
**Rank**	Rank amongst leaders in career earned run average. A blank field indicates a tie.
**Player**	Name of player.
**ERA**	Total career earned run average.
*	Denotes elected to National Baseball Hall of Fame.
**Bold**	Denotes an active player. (Note: A player is considered inactive if he has announced his retirement or has not played for a full season.)

== List ==
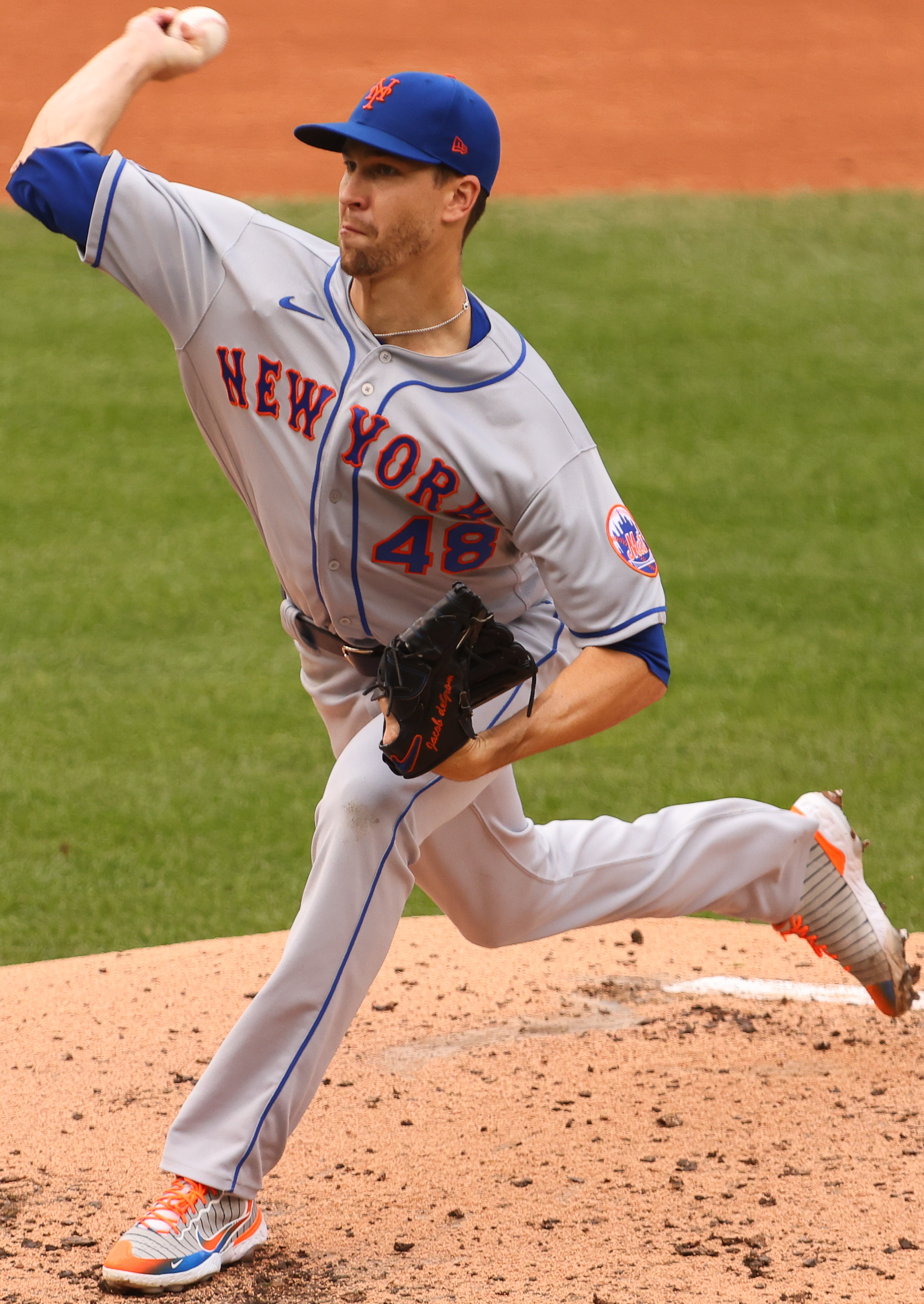
Jacob deGrom, the active leader and 85th all-time in career earned run average.

- Stats updated as of September 25, 2026.

Rank	Player	ERA
1	Ed Walsh*	1.816
2	Addie Joss*	1.887
3	Jim Devlin	1.896
4	Jack Pfiester	2.024
5	Smoky Joe Wood	2.033
6	Mordecai Brown*	2.057
7	John Montgomery Ward*	2.099
8	Christy Mathewson*	2.133
	Al Spalding*	2.133
10	Tommy Bond	2.138
11	Rube Waddell*	2.161
12	Walter Johnson*	2.167
13	Mariano Rivera*	2.209
14	Jake Weimer	2.231
15	Orval Overall	2.257
16	Will White	2.276
17	Babe Ruth*	2.277
18	Ed Reulbach	2.284
19	Jim Scott	2.298
20	Reb Russell	2.334
21	Andy Coakley	2.350
	Eddie Plank*	2.350
23	Larry Corcoran	2.355
24	Eddie Cicotte	2.380
25	George McQuillan	2.381
26	Ed Killian	2.382
27	Doc White	2.391
28	Harry Coveleski	2.394
29	Carl Lundgren	2.417
30	Nap Rucker	2.421
31	Candy Cummings*	2.424
32	Jeff Tesreau	2.428
33	Joe Benz	2.429
34	Jim McCormick	2.431
35	George Bradley	2.434
36	Terry Larkin	2.435
37	Chief Bender*	2.455
38	Hooks Wiltse	2.471
39	Sam Leever	2.473
	Lefty Leifield	2.473
41	Hippo Vaughn	2.486
42	Bob Ewing	2.492
43	Cy Morgan	2.509
44	Ray Collins	2.513
45	Hoyt Wilhelm*	2.523
46	Clayton Kershaw	2.534
47	Lew Richie	2.536
48	Noodles Hahn	2.546
49	George Zettlein	2.547
50	Frank Owen	2.552

Rank	Player	ERA
51	Grover Cleveland Alexander*	2.560
52	Slim Sallee	2.564
53	Deacon Phillippe	2.586
54	Russ Ford	2.590
55	Frank Smith	2.592
56	Ed Siever	2.598
57	Bob Rhoads	2.612
58	Cherokee Fisher	2.613
59	Fred Glade	2.618
60	Tim Keefe*	2.627
	Cy Young*	2.627
62	Vic Willis*	2.628
63	Red Ames	2.629
64	Barney Pelty	2.632
65	Claude Hendrix	2.649
66	Jack Taylor	2.653
67	Joe McGinnity	2.657
	Dick Rudolph	2.657
69	Pete Schneider	2.663
70	Nick Altrock	2.669
	Carl Weilman	2.669
72	Charlie Ferguson	2.674
73	Charles Radbourn*	2.678
74	Johnny Lush	2.680
75	Cy Falkenberg	2.682
76	Jack Chesbro*	2.684
77	Fred Toney	2.689
78	Bill Donovan	2.690
79	Larry Cheney	2.698
80	Vean Gregg	2.701
81	Dick McBride	2.706
82	Mickey Welch*	2.712
83	Ned Garvin	2.718
84	Bob Wicker	2.726
85	**Jacob deGrom**	2.728
86	Fred Goldsmith	2.729
87	Bill Foster*	2.732
88	Nick Cullop	2.733
89	Harry Howell	2.738
	Bullet Rogan*	2.738
91	Whitey Ford*	2.745
92	Dummy Taylor	2.747
93	Howie Camnitz	2.749
	Roy Patterson	2.749
95	Babe Adams	2.755
96	Dutch Leonard	2.759
97	Dan Quisenberry	2.760
98	Sandy Koufax*	2.761
99	Jeff Pfeffer	2.774
100	Al Demaree	2.775
	Earl Moore	2.775

== See also ==
- Baseball statistics
- List of Major League Baseball annual ERA leaders
