= 1872 Washington Nationals season =

1872 Washington Nationals
- League: National Association of Professional Base Ball Players
- Ballpark: National Grounds
- City: Washington D.C.
- Record: 0–11 (.000)
- League place: 10th
- Managers: Joe Miller

The Washington Nationals played their first and only season of professional baseball in 1872 as a member of the National Association of Professional Base Ball Players. They finished eleventh in the league with a record of 0–11.

== Regular season ==
=== Season standings ===
| Pos | Team | Pld | W | L | T | RF | RA | RD | GB |
|---|---|---|---|---|---|---|---|---|---|
| 1 | Boston Red Stockings (C) | 48 | 39 | 8 | 1 | 521 | 236 | +285 | — |
| 2 | Baltimore Canaries | 58 | 35 | 19 | 4 | 617 | 434 | +183 | 7.5 |
| 3 | New York Mutuals | 56 | 34 | 20 | 2 | 523 | 362 | +161 | 8.5 |
| 4 | Philadelphia Athletics | 47 | 30 | 14 | 3 | 539 | 349 | +190 | 7.5 |
| 5 | Troy Haymakers | 25 | 15 | 10 | 0 | 273 | 191 | +82 | 13 |
| 6 | Brooklyn Atlantics | 37 | 9 | 28 | 0 | 237 | 473 | −236 | 25 |
| 7 | Cleveland Forest Citys | 22 | 6 | 16 | 0 | 174 | 254 | −80 | 20.5 |
| 8 | Middletown Mansfields | 24 | 5 | 19 | 0 | 220 | 348 | −128 | 22.5 |
| 9 | Brooklyn Eckfords | 29 | 3 | 26 | 0 | 152 | 413 | −261 | 27 |
| 10 | Washington Olympics | 9 | 2 | 7 | 0 | 54 | 140 | −86 | 18 |
| 11 | Washington Nationals | 11 | 0 | 11 | 0 | 80 | 190 | −110 | 21 |

Source: Baseball Reference
(C) Champions

=== Record vs. opponents ===
1872 National Association Records Sources:
| Team | BAL | BOS | BRA | BRE | CLE | MID | NY | PHI | TRO | WSN | WSO |
|---|---|---|---|---|---|---|---|---|---|---|---|
| Baltimore | — | 0–7 | 5–1 | 5–1 | 4–1 | 4–0 | 5–4–2 | 4–5–2 | 3–0 | 3–0 | 2–0 |
| Boston | 7–0 | — | 7–1 | 3–0 | 4–0 | 3–0 | 7–2 | 4–4–1 | 2–1 | 1–0 | 1–0 |
| Brooklyn Atlantics | 1–5 | 1–7 | — | 2–2 | 1–1 | 2–1 | 2–6 | 0–4 | 0–2 | 0–0 | 0–0 |
| Brooklyn Eckfords | 1–5 | 0–3 | 2–2 | — | 0–1 | 0–2 | 0–5 | 0–5 | 0–3 | 0–0 | 0–0 |
| Cleveland | 1–4 | 0–4 | 1–1 | 1–0 | — | 0–1 | 1–2 | 0–3 | 0–1 | 1–0 | 1–0 |
| Middletown | 0–4 | 0–3 | 1–2 | 2–0 | 1–0 | — | 0–4 | 0–2 | 0–4 | 1–0 | 0–0 |
| New York | 4–5–2 | 2–7 | 6–2 | 5–0 | 2–1 | 4–0 | — | 6–3 | 3–2 | 1–0 | 1–0 |
| Philadelphia | 5–4–2 | 4–4–1 | 4–0 | 5–0 | 3–0 | 2–0 | 3–6 | — | 2–0 | 1–0 | 1–0 |
| Troy | 0–3 | 1–2 | 2–0 | 3–0 | 1–0 | 4–0 | 2–3 | 0–2 | — | 1–0 | 1–0 |
| Washington Nationals | 0–3 | 0–1 | 0–0 | 0–0 | 0–1 | 0–1 | 0–1 | 0–1 | 0–1 | — | 0–2 |
| Washington Olympics | 0–2 | 0–1 | 0–0 | 0–0 | 0–1 | 0–0 | 0–1 | 0–1 | 0–1 | 2–0 | — |

=== Roster ===
1872 Washington Nationals
Roster
| Pitchers: Bill Stearns; Catchers: Bill Lennon | Infielders: Jacob Doyle; Paul Hines; Holly Hollingshead; Joe Miller; Spencer; Warren White | Outfielders: Oscar Bielaski; Dennis Coughlin; John Glenn; Ed Mincher; Sy Studley; Bill Yeatman | Managers: Joe Miller |

== Player stats ==
=== Batting ===
Note: G = Games played; AB = At bats; H = Hits; Avg. = Batting average; HR = Home runs; RBI = Runs batted in

| Player | G | AB | H | Avg. | HR | RBI |
|---|---|---|---|---|---|---|
| Bill Lennon | 11 | 54 | 11 | .204 | 0 | 6 |
| Paul Hines | 11 | 49 | 11 | .224 | 0 | 5 |
| Holly Hollingshead | 9 | 44 | 14 | .318 | 0 | 6 |
| Jacob Doyle | 9 | 41 | 11 | .268 | 0 | 9 |
| Warren White | 10 | 45 | 12 | .267 | 0 | 4 |
| Ed Mincher | 11 | 53 | 5 | .094 | 0 | 4 |
| Sy Studley | 5 | 21 | 2 | .095 | 0 | 2 |
| Oscar Bielaski | 10 | 46 | 8 | .174 | 0 | 3 |
| Dennis Coughlin | 8 | 37 | 11 | .297 | 0 | 7 |
| Bill Yeatman | 1 | 4 | 0 | .000 | 0 | 0 |
| Joe Miller | 1 | 4 | 1 | .250 | 0 | 0 |
| Spencer | 1 | 4 | 0 | .000 | 0 | 0 |
| John Glenn | 1 | 4 | 2 | .500 | 0 | 0 |

=== Starting pitchers ===
Note: G = Games pitched; IP = Innings Pitched; W = Wins; L = Losses; ERA = Earned run average; SO = Strikeouts

| Player | G | IP | W | L | ERA | SO |
|---|---|---|---|---|---|---|
| Bill Stearns | 11 | 99.0 | 0 | 11 | 6.18 | 2 |
