= Denny Clare =

American baseball player (1853–1928)

- Second base / Shortstop
- Born: January 1853; Brooklyn, New York, United States
- Died: November 26, 1928 (aged 75); Brooklyn, New York
- Batted: Unknown Threw: Unknown

MLB debut
- September 14, 1872, for the Brooklyn Atlantics

Last MLB appearance
- September 16, 1872, for the Brooklyn Atlantics

MLB statistics
- Batting average: .143
- Runs scored: 1
- RBI: 0
- Stats at Baseball Reference

Teams
- Brooklyn Atlantics (1872)

Dennis J. Clare (January 1853 – November 26, 1928) was a professional baseball player who played second base and shortstop in two games for the 1872 Brooklyn Atlantics team of the NAPBBP.

== Baseball career ==
Prior to appearing with the 1872 Atlantics, Clare played for Brooklyn's Amity club. He started both of his major league games at second base, but also played several innings at shortstop. At the plate, Clare faced pitcher Candy Cummings in both games, and garnered one hit in seven at bats. Throughout the 1870s, he played baseball with several different Brooklyn-based clubs until he moved to Witoka, Minnesota. Clare later returned to Brooklyn, and in 1882 became captain of the Brooklyn Stars, a position he held into his mid-30s.

== Other career and death ==
Clare worked as a recording clerk for the Kings County Criminal Court in the 1870s, where he was a court officer during Theodore Tilton's adultery lawsuit against Henry Ward Beecher. He died in Brooklyn in 1928.
