= Dick McBride (baseball) =

American baseball player (1847–1916)

- Pitcher / Right fielder / player-manager
- Born: June 14, 1847; Philadelphia, Pennsylvania, U.S.
- Died: January 20, 1916 (aged 68); Philadelphia, Pennsylvania, U.S.
- Batted: Unknown Threw: Right

Major-league debut
- May 20, 1871, for the Philadelphia Athletics

Last major-league appearance
- July 13, 1876, for the Boston Red Stockings

Major-league statistics
- Win–loss record: 149–78
- Earned run average: 2.71
- Complete games: 227
- Batting average: .259
- Runs batted in: 177
- Managerial record: 161–84–6
- Managerial W%: .657
- Stats at Baseball Reference

Teams
- National Association of Base Ball Players Philadelphia Athletics (1861–1870) League Player Philadelphia Athletics (1871–1875) Boston Red Stockings (1876) League Manager Philadelphia Athletics (1871–1875)

Career highlights and awards
- National Association pennant (1871); National Association ERA leader (1874)

John Dickson "Dick" McBride (June 14, 1847 – January 20, 1916) was an American professional baseball pitcher, right fielder, and player-manager from Philadelphia, Pennsylvania, for the Philadelphia Athletics of the National Association from 1871 through most of 1875 until Cap Anson took over as player-manager for the remaining eight games of the season. He had a pitching record of 149 wins and 74 losses during that period. In 1871, he went 18-5 and led Philadelphia to the NA championship. McBride finished his major league career in 1876 when he was signed by the Boston Red Stockings of the National League after the Association failed. He had a record of 0-4 before his career came to an end. McBride died in Philadelphia at the age of 70, and is interred at Lawnview Cemetery in Rockledge, Pennsylvania.

In 1864, while serving in the Union Army during the Civil War, he was allowed to take a 3-day furlough to participate in a series of baseball exhibitions between clubs from Brooklyn and the local Philadelphia clubs. It was during this time that the north's attention had turned to military defense, not baseball, so Brooklyn strategically scheduled these events hoping to take advantage of the situation to get some well sought after wins in "enemy" territory. The presence of McBride didn't do much, as all Philly teams were beaten soundly.

== See also ==
- List of Major League Baseball career ERA leaders
- List of Major League Baseball annual shutout leaders
