= 1872 Baltimore Canaries season =

1872 Baltimore Canaries
- League: National Association of Professional Base Ball Players
- Ballpark: Newington Park
- City: Baltimore, Maryland
- Record: 35–19 (.648)
- League place: 2nd
- Managers: Bill Craver, Everett Mills

The Baltimore Canaries played their first season in 1872 as a member of the National Association of Professional Base Ball Players. They finished second in the league with a record of 35–19. Outfielder Lip Pike led the NA in home runs, with 7, and runs batted in, with 60. Pitcher Bobby Mathews paced the circuit in strikeouts. Baltimore's other pitcher, Cherokee Fisher, led in earned run average.

Several of the team's players were later suspended from baseball for fixing games; Bill Craver, George Hall, and Dick Higham were banned for life.

== Regular season ==
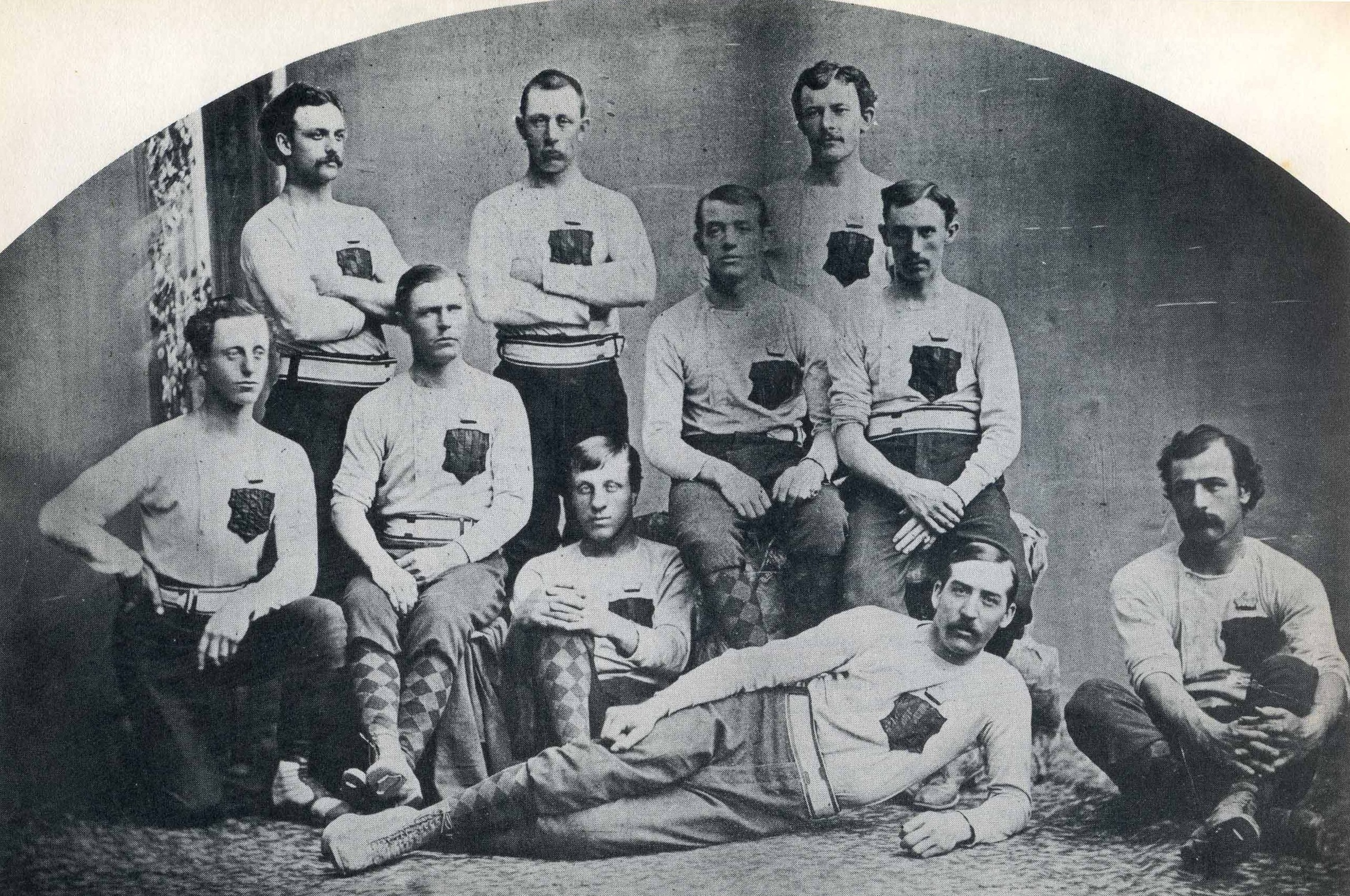
1872 Baltimore Canaries

=== Season standings ===
Pos	Team	Pld	W	L	T	RF	RA	RD	GB
1	Boston Red Stockings (C)	48	39	8	1	521	236	+285	—
2	Baltimore Canaries	58	35	19	4	617	434	+183	7.5
3	New York Mutuals	56	34	20	2	523	362	+161	8.5
4	Philadelphia Athletics	47	30	14	3	539	349	+190	7.5
5	Troy Haymakers	25	15	10	0	273	191	+82	13
6	Brooklyn Atlantics	37	9	28	0	237	473	−236	25
7	Cleveland Forest Citys	22	6	16	0	174	254	−80	20.5
8	Middletown Mansfields	24	5	19	0	220	348	−128	22.5
9	Brooklyn Eckfords	29	3	26	0	152	413	−261	27
10	Washington Olympics	9	2	7	0	54	140	−86	18
11	Washington Nationals	11	0	11	0	80	190	−110	21

Source: Baseball Reference
(C) Champions

=== Record vs. opponents ===
1872 National Association Records Sources:
Team	BAL	BOS	BRA	BRE	CLE	MID	NY	PHI	TRO	WSN	WSO
Baltimore	—	0–7	5–1	5–1	4–1	4–0	5–4–2	4–5–2	3–0	3–0	2–0
Boston	7–0	—	7–1	3–0	4–0	3–0	7–2	4–4–1	2–1	1–0	1–0
Brooklyn Atlantics	1–5	1–7	—	2–2	1–1	2–1	2–6	0–4	0–2	0–0	0–0
Brooklyn Eckfords	1–5	0–3	2–2	—	0–1	0–2	0–5	0–5	0–3	0–0	0–0
Cleveland	1–4	0–4	1–1	1–0	—	0–1	1–2	0–3	0–1	1–0	1–0
Middletown	0–4	0–3	1–2	2–0	1–0	—	0–4	0–2	0–4	1–0	0–0
New York	4–5–2	2–7	6–2	5–0	2–1	4–0	—	6–3	3–2	1–0	1–0
Philadelphia	5–4–2	4–4–1	4–0	5–0	3–0	2–0	3–6	—	2–0	1–0	1–0
Troy	0–3	1–2	2–0	3–0	1–0	4–0	2–3	0–2	—	1–0	1–0
Washington Nationals	0–3	0–1	0–0	0–0	0–1	0–1	0–1	0–1	0–1	—	0–2
Washington Olympics	0–2	0–1	0–0	0–0	0–1	0–0	0–1	0–1	0–1	2–0	—

=== Roster ===
1872 Baltimore Canaries
Roster
Pitchers: Bobby Mathews; Cherokee Fisher	Catchers: Bill Craver; Scott Hastings; Dick Higham; Infielders: Tom Carey; Davy Force; Everett Mills; John Radcliff	Outfielders: George Hall; Lip Pike; Tom York	Manager: Bill Craver; Everett Mills

== Player stats ==
=== Batting ===
==== Starters by position ====
Note: Pos = Position; G = Games played; AB = At bats; H = Hits; Avg. = Batting average; HR = Home runs; RBI = Runs batted in

Pos	Player	G	AB	H	Avg.	HR	RBI
C	Bill Craver	35	178	50	.281	0	24
1B	Everett Mills	55	266	79	.297	0	34
2B	Tom Carey	42	196	57	.291	2	27
SS	John Radcliff	56	297	86	.290	1	44
3B	Davy Force	19	95	41	.432	0	14
OF	Tom York	51	250	66	.264	0	40
OF	Lip Pike	56	285	85	.298	7	60
OF	George Hall	53	250	84	.336	1	37

==== Other batters ====
Note: G = Games played; AB = At bats; H = Hits; Avg. = Batting average; HR = Home runs; RBI = Runs batted in

Player	G	AB	H	Avg.	HR	RBI
Dick Higham	50	245	84	.343	2	37
Cherokee Fisher	46	225	52	.231	1	36
Scott Hastings	13	62	19	.306	0	4

=== Pitching ===
==== Starting pitchers ====
Note: G = Games pitched; IP = Innings pitched; W = Wins; L = Losses; ERA = Earned run average; SO = Strikeouts

Player	G	IP	W	L	ERA	SO
Bobby Mathews	49	406.0	25	18	3.19	57
Cherokee Fisher	19	110.0	10	1	1.80	20
