= James Cavanagh (baseball) =

American baseball player (1850–1890)

- First baseman / Right fielder
- Born: c. 1850; United Kingdom
- Died: October 14, 1890 (aged 39–40); Brooklyn, New York, U.S.
- Batted: Unknown Threw: Unknown

MLB debut
- September 11, 1872, for the Brooklyn Eckfords

Last MLB appearance
- September 19, 1872, for the Brooklyn Eckfords

MLB statistics
- Games played: 5
- At bats: 23
- Hits: 6
- Stats at Baseball Reference

Teams
- Brooklyn Eckfords (1872)

James J. Cavanagh (c. 1850 – October 14, 1890) was a Major League Baseball first baseman and outfielder. Cavanagh was born in the United Kingdom. Cavanagh played for the Brooklyn Eckfords in 1872. He died in Brooklyn, New York on October 14, 1890.
