= Josh Snyder =

American baseball player (1844–1881)

- Outfielder
- Born: March 1844; Brooklyn, New York
- Died: April 21, 1881 (aged 37); Brooklyn, New York
- Batted: Unknown Threw: Unknown

MLB debut
- May 18, 1872, for the Brooklyn Eckfords

Last MLB appearance
- July 9, 1872, for the Brooklyn Eckfords

MLB statistics
- Games played: 9
- Runs scored: 2
- Hits: 6
- Batting average: .162
- Stats at Baseball Reference

Teams
- National Association of Base Ball Players Brooklyn Eckfords (1860–1870) National Association of Professional BBP Brooklyn Eckfords (1872)

Joshua Snyder (1844–1881), was a professional baseball player who played outfield in Major League Baseball for the 1872 Brooklyn Eckfords.
