= David Lenz (baseball) =

American baseball player (1851–1886)

- Catcher
- Born: January 21, 1851; Germany
- Died: May 21, 1886 (aged 35); Brooklyn, New York, U.S.
- Batted: Unknown Threw: Unknown

MLB debut
- May 7, 1872, for the Brooklyn Eckfords

Last MLB appearance
- May 21, 1872, for the Brooklyn Eckfords

MLB statistics
- Games played: 4
- Runs scored: 2
- Hits: 1
- Batting average: .083
- Stats at Baseball Reference

Teams
- Brooklyn Eckfords (1872)

David Lenz (January 21, 1851 – May 21, 1886) was a German born professional baseball player who played catcher in Major League Baseball for the 1872 Brooklyn Eckfords.
