= Tom Malone (baseball) =

American baseball player

- Pitcher
- Batted: Unknown Threw: Unknown

MLB debut
- June 20, 1872, for the Brooklyn Eckfords

Last MLB appearance
- September 13, 1872, for the Brooklyn Eckfords

MLB statistics
- Win–loss record: 0-3
- Earned run average: 11.33
- Complete games: 3

Teams
- National Association of Base Ball Players Brooklyn Eckfords (1867–1868, 1870) National Association of Professional BBP Brooklyn Eckfords (1872)

Thomas F. Malone was a professional baseball player who played pitcher in the National Association for the 1872 Brooklyn Eckfords.
