= Tom Foley (outfielder) =

American baseball player (1847–1896)

- Outfielder
- Born: June 14, 1847; Chicago, Illinois, U.S.
- Died: January 4, 1896 (aged 48); La Grange, Illinois, U.S.
- Batted: Switch Threw: Right

MLB debut
- May 8, 1871, for the Chicago White Stockings

Last MLB appearance
- October 30, 1871, for the Chicago White Stockings

MLB statistics
- Games played: 18
- Batting average: .262
- Runs batted in: 13
- Stats at Baseball Reference

Teams
- National Association of Base Ball Players Rockford Forest Citys (1869–1870) National Association of Professional BBP Chicago White Stockings (1871)

Thomas James Foley (1847 in Chicago – January 4, 1896 in LaGrange, Illinois) was an American professional baseball player who was an outfielder in the Major Leagues in 1871. He played for the Chicago White Stockings.
