= John Barrett (outfielder) =

American baseball player

- Left fielder
- Born: Unknown; Brooklyn, New York
- Died: Unknown
- Batted: Unknown Threw: Unknown

MLB debut
- September 18, 1872,, for the Brooklyn Atlantics

Last MLB appearance
- October 31, 1872,, for the Brooklyn Atlantics

MLB statistics
- Batting average: .206
- Hits: 7
- Runs scored: 6
- Stats at Baseball Reference

Teams
- Brooklyn Atlantics (1872)

John Barrett was an American professional left fielder for the 1872 Brooklyn Atlantics of the National Association. He played in eight games from September 18 to October 31, seven of which were in left field, and gathered seven hits in 34 at bats for a .206 batting average.
