= Bub McAtee =

American baseball player (1845–1876)

- First baseman
- Born: March 1845; Troy, New York, U.S.
- Died: October 18, 1876 (aged 31); Troy, New York, U.S.
- Batted: Unknown Threw: Right

Major-league debut
- May 8, 1871, for the Chicago White Stockings

Last major-league appearance
- July 23, 1871, for the Troy Haymakers

Major-league statistics
- Games played: 51
- Hits: 65
- Batting average: .249
- Stats at Baseball Reference

Teams
- National Association of Base Ball Players Troy Haymakers (1866–1869) Chicago White Stockings (1870) National Association of Professional BBP Chicago White Stockings (1871) Troy Haymakers (1872)

Michael James "Bub" McAtee (March 1845 – October 18, 1876) was an American professional baseball player who played two seasons in the National Association. He played one season for the Chicago White Stockings (1871) and one for the Troy Haymakers (1872). He was the regular first baseman for both clubs. At the plate he went 65-for-264, for a .246 batting average, with 25 RBIs and 64 runs scored.

McAtee died at the age of 31 in his hometown of Troy, New York, from tuberculosis, and is interred at Saint John Cemetery.
