= Dennis Coughlin =

American baseball player (1844–1913)

- Outfielder
- Born: January 1844; New York City, New York, U.S.
- Died: May 14, 1913 (aged 69); Washington D.C., U.S.
- Batted: Unknown Threw: Unknown

MLB debut
- April 27, 1872, for the Washington Nationals

Last MLB appearance
- June 26, 1872, for the Washington Nationals

MLB statistics
- Games played: 8
- Batting average: .297
- Hits: 11
- Stats at Baseball Reference

Teams
- National Association of Base Ball Players Washington Nationals (1872)

Dennis F. Coughlin (January 1844 – May 14, 1913) was an American professional baseball player who played as an outfielder during the 1872 season for the Washington Nationals in the National Association.

Coughlin is remembered as the only major leaguer who was wounded in combat in the Civil War. He was a sergeant in Company E, 140th New York Infantry. After his time in baseball, he worked in the U.S. Treasury Department for 45 years.
