= Marshall King =

American baseball player (1849–1911)

- Outfielder / Catcher / Shortstop
- Born: December 1849; Lansingburgh, New York, U.S.
- Died: October 19, 1911 (aged 61); Troy, New York, U.S.
- Batted: Unknown Threw: Right

Major-league debut
- May 8, 1871, for the Chicago White Stockings

Last major-league appearance
- June 17, 1872, for the Troy Haymakers

Major-league statistics
- Batting average: .188
- Home runs: 2
- Runs batted in: 17
- Stats at Baseball Reference

Teams
- National Association of Base Ball Players Troy Haymakers (1867–1869) Chicago White Stockings (1870) National Association of Professional BBP Chicago White Stockings (1871) Troy Haymakers (1872)

Marshall Ney King (December 1849 – October 19, 1911) was an American professional baseball player who played as a center fielder as well as a catcher and shortstop for two seasons in the National Association, from 1871 to 1872. King played for the Chicago White Stockings and Troy Haymakers. His older brother was baseball player Steve King. He was born in Lansingburgh, New York, and died at the age of 61 in Troy, New York. He is interred at Oakwood Cemetery located in Troy.
