= Frank McCarton =

American baseball player (1854–1907)

- Outfielder
- Born: October 6, 1854; New York, New York, U.S.
- Died: June 17, 1907 (aged 52); New York, New York, U.S.
- Batted: Unknown Threw: Unknown

MLB debut
- April 26, 1872, for the Middletown Mansfields

Last MLB appearance
- August 5, 1872, for the Middletown Mansfields

MLB statistics
- Games played: 19
- Batting average: .305
- Hits: 25
- RBI: 12
- Errors: 9
- Fielding percentage: .743
- Stats at Baseball Reference

Teams
- Middletown Mansfields (1872)

Francis J. McCarton (October 6, 1854 – June 17, 1907) was an American professional baseball player who played as an outfielder during the 1872 season for the Middletown Mansfields in the National Association.
