= Cherokee Fisher =

American baseball player (1844–1912)

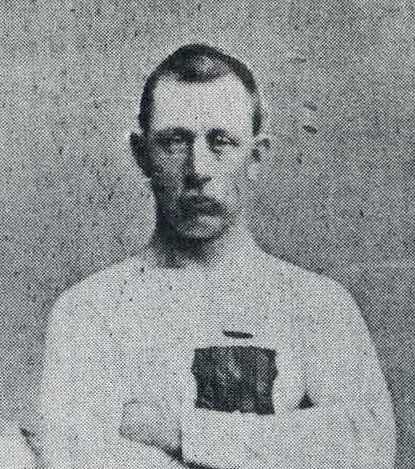
- Fisher in 1872
- Pitcher
- Born: November 1844; Philadelphia, Pennsylvania, US
- Died: September 26, 1912 (aged 67); New York City, New York, US
- Batted: Right Threw: Right

Major league debut
- May 6, 1871, for the Rockford Forest Citys

Last major league appearance
- July 9, 1878, for the Providence Grays

Major league statistics
- Win–loss record: 56–84
- Earned run average: 2.61
- Strikeouts: 123
- Stats at Baseball Reference

Teams
- National Association of Base Ball Players West Philadelphia (1867) Buckeye of Cincinnati (1868) Troy Haymakers (1869–1870) League Player Rockford Forest Citys (1871) Baltimore Canaries (1872) Athletic of Philadelphia (1873) Hartford Dark Blues (1874) Philadelphia White Stockings (1875) Cincinnati Reds (1876) Providence Grays (1878)

Career highlights and awards
- 2× NA ERA leader (1872, 1873)

William Charles "Cherokee" Fisher (November 1844 – September 26, 1912) was an American amateur and professional baseball pitcher who played in the National Association from 1871 to 1875 and the National League in 1876 and 1878.

== Career ==
Fisher was a pitcher during organized baseball's formative years, from about 1867 to the end of his career in 1878. He was known for his fastball on the field and his heavy drinking off it. William J. Ryczek wrote:

There appeared to be a connection between a predilection for alcohol and the tendency to revolve [i.e., change teams frequently]... Cherokee Fisher, whose meandering will be detailed later, was another case which strengthens this connection. A heavy consumer of alcohol would logically be much more susceptible to the overtures of other clubs, as well as more likely to be in need of money.

He played for the West Philadelphias in 1867, the Cincinnati Buckeyes in 1868, the Troy Haymakers in 1869 and 1870, and the Chicago Dreadnaughts in 1870 as well.

Fisher played in the major leagues from 1871 to 1878. He played for the Rockford Forest Citys, Baltimore Canaries, Athletic of Philadelphia, Hartford Dark Blues, Philadelphia White Stockings, Cincinnati Reds, and Providence Grays. With the Baltimore Canaries in 1872, Fisher had 10 wins, one loss, and a league-leading 1.80 earned run average. He repeated as ERA champion the next season while pitching for the Philadelphia Athletics, posting a nearly identical 1.81 mark. On May 2, 1876, he gave up the first home run in National League history to Chicago White Stockings star Ross Barnes. After retiring, Fisher served for many years in the Chicago Fire Department.

== See also ==
- List of Major League Baseball career ERA leaders
- List of Major League Baseball annual shutout leaders
