= 1872 Boston Red Stockings season =

1872 Boston Red Stockings
- National Association Champions
- League: National Association of Professional Base Ball Players
- Ballpark: South End Grounds
- City: Boston, Massachusetts
- Record: 39–8 (.830)
- League place: 1st
- Owners: John A. Conkey
- Managers: Harry Wright

The 1872 Boston Red Stockings season was the second season of the franchise. They won the National Association championship.

Managed by Harry Wright, Boston finished with a record of 39–8 to win the pennant by 7.5 games. Pitcher Al Spalding started all 48 of the Red Stockings' games and led the NA with 38 wins. Second baseman Ross Barnes won the league batting title with a .430 batting average. Harry Wright, Al Spalding, and shortstop George Wright have all been elected into the Baseball Hall of Fame.

== Regular season ==
=== Season standings ===
Pos	Team	Pld	W	L	T	RF	RA	RD	GB
1	Boston Red Stockings (C)	48	39	8	1	521	236	+285	—
2	Baltimore Canaries	58	35	19	4	617	434	+183	7.5
3	New York Mutuals	56	34	20	2	523	362	+161	8.5
4	Philadelphia Athletics	47	30	14	3	539	349	+190	7.5
5	Troy Haymakers	25	15	10	0	273	191	+82	13
6	Brooklyn Atlantics	37	9	28	0	237	473	−236	25
7	Cleveland Forest Citys	22	6	16	0	174	254	−80	20.5
8	Middletown Mansfields	24	5	19	0	220	348	−128	22.5
9	Brooklyn Eckfords	29	3	26	0	152	413	−261	27
10	Washington Olympics	9	2	7	0	54	140	−86	18
11	Washington Nationals	11	0	11	0	80	190	−110	21

Source: Baseball Reference
(C) Champions

=== Record vs. opponents ===
1872 National Association Records Sources:
Team	BAL	BOS	BRA	BRE	CLE	MID	NY	PHI	TRO	WSN	WSO
Baltimore	—	0–7	5–1	5–1	4–1	4–0	5–4–2	4–5–2	3–0	3–0	2–0
Boston	7–0	—	7–1	3–0	4–0	3–0	7–2	4–4–1	2–1	1–0	1–0
Brooklyn Atlantics	1–5	1–7	—	2–2	1–1	2–1	2–6	0–4	0–2	0–0	0–0
Brooklyn Eckfords	1–5	0–3	2–2	—	0–1	0–2	0–5	0–5	0–3	0–0	0–0
Cleveland	1–4	0–4	1–1	1–0	—	0–1	1–2	0–3	0–1	1–0	1–0
Middletown	0–4	0–3	1–2	2–0	1–0	—	0–4	0–2	0–4	1–0	0–0
New York	4–5–2	2–7	6–2	5–0	2–1	4–0	—	6–3	3–2	1–0	1–0
Philadelphia	5–4–2	4–4–1	4–0	5–0	3–0	2–0	3–6	—	2–0	1–0	1–0
Troy	0–3	1–2	2–0	3–0	1–0	4–0	2–3	0–2	—	1–0	1–0
Washington Nationals	0–3	0–1	0–0	0–0	0–1	0–1	0–1	0–1	0–1	—	0–2
Washington Olympics	0–2	0–1	0–0	0–0	0–1	0–0	0–1	0–1	0–1	2–0	—

=== Roster ===
1872 Boston Red Stockings
Roster
Pitchers: Albert Spalding; Harry Wright	Catchers: Cal McVey; Infielders: Ross Barnes; Charlie Gould; Harry Schafer; George Wright	Outfielders: Dave Birdsall; Andy Leonard; Fraley Rogers; Harry Wright	Manager: Harry Wright

== Player stats ==
=== Batting ===
==== Starters by position ====
Note: Pos = Position; G = Games played; AB = At bats; H = Hits; Avg. = Batting average; HR = Home runs; RBI = Runs batted in

Pos	Player	G	AB	H	Avg.	HR	RBI
C	Cal McVey	46	237	76	.321	0	41
1B	Charlie Gould	45	212	54	.255	0	32
2B	Ross Barnes	45	230	99	.430	1	44
SS	George Wright	48	255	86	.337	2	35
3B	Harry Schafer	48	226	65	.288	1	35
OF	Harry Wright	48	208	53	.255	0	24
OF	Fraley Rogers	45	204	56	.275	1	28
OF	Andy Leonard	46	241	84	.349	2	42

==== Other batters ====
Note: G = Games played; AB = At bats; H = Hits; Avg. = Batting average; HR = Home runs; RBI = Runs batted in

Player	G	AB	H	Avg.	HR	RBI
Dave Birdsall	16	76	16	.211	1	15

=== Pitching ===
==== Starting pitchers ====
Note: G = Games pitched; IP = Innings pitched; W = Wins; L = Losses; ERA = Earned run average; SO = Strikeouts

Player	G	IP	W	L	ERA	SO
Al Spalding	48	404.2	38	8	1.85	28

==== Relief pitchers ====
Note: G = Games pitched; IP = Innings pitched; W = Wins; L = Losses; ERA = Earned run average; SO = Strikeouts

Player	G	IP	W	L	ERA	SO
Harry Wright	7	25.2	1	0	2.10	1

Preceded by Philadelphia Athletics; 1871	National Association of Professional Base Ball Players Championship Season; 1872	Succeeded by Boston Red Stockings; 1873
