= William Bestick =

American baseball player

- Catcher
- Born: Unknown; New York, New York, U.S.
- Died: Unknown
- Batted: Unknown Threw: Unknown

MLB debut
- June 20, 1872, for the Brooklyn Eckfords

Last MLB appearance
- July 9, 1872, for the Brooklyn Eckfords

MLB statistics
- Games played: 4
- Hits: 4
- Batting average: .286
- Stats at Baseball Reference

Teams
- Brooklyn Eckfords (1872)

William Bestick was an American professional baseball player in the early 1870s. He appeared in four games with the 1872 Brooklyn Eckfords, three of which as the catcher. In 14 at bats, he collected four hits for a .286 batting average. It is not known when or where he was born, nor when he died. Peter Morris, a baseball historian for SABR, claims that the only known man by this name that has been found, died on July 28, 1911, in New York, NY.
