= Joe Simmons (baseball) =

American baseball player (1845–1901)

- Outfielder/First baseman
- Born: June 13, 1845; New York City, US
- Died: July 24, 1901 (aged 56); Jersey City, New Jersey, US
- Batted: Unknown Threw: Unknown

Major-league debut
- May 8, 1871, for the Chicago White Stockings

Last major-league appearance
- June 14, 1875, for the Keokuk Westerns

Major-league statistics
- Games played: 58
- Runs scored: 45
- Batting average: .221
- Stats at Baseball Reference

Teams
- National Association of Base Ball Players Rockford Forest Citys (1870) League Player Chicago White Stockings (1871) Cleveland Forest Citys (1872) Keokuk Westerns (1875) League Manager Keokuk Westerns (1875) Wilmington Quicksteps (1884)

Joseph S. Simmons (born Joseph Simmons Chabriel; June 13, 1845 – July 24, 1901) was an American professional baseball player and manager from New York City. Simmons played three seasons in the National Association; the last year he was player-manager for the Keokuk Westerns, a team that would win just one game of the 13 that they played. He later became the manager for the Wilmington Quicksteps of the Eastern League. Late in the 1884 season, after winning the Eastern League title, the Quicksteps joined the Union Association as a replacement team, but won only 2 of their 18 games.

Simmons died in Jersey City, New Jersey at the age of 56.
