= Val Robinson (baseball) =

American baseball player (1848–1898)

- Outfielder
- Born: August 31, 1848; Washington, D.C., U.S.
- Died: August 2, 1898 (aged 49); Washington, D.C., U.S.
- Batted: Unknown Threw: Unknown

MLB debut
- May 1, 1872, for the Washington Olympics

Last MLB appearance
- May 24, 1872, for the Washington Olympics

MLB statistics
- Batting average: .200
- Home runs: 0
- Runs batted in: 4
- Stats at Baseball Reference

Teams
- National Association of Base Ball Players Washington Olympics (1868–1870) National Association of Professional BBP Washington Olympics (1872)

Alfred Valentine Robinson (August 31, 1848 – August 2, 1898) was an American Major League Baseball outfielder who played for the Washington Olympics in 1872. He was born and died in Washington, D.C.
