= Nicholas Young (executive) =

American professional baseball executive (1840–1916)

Nick Young
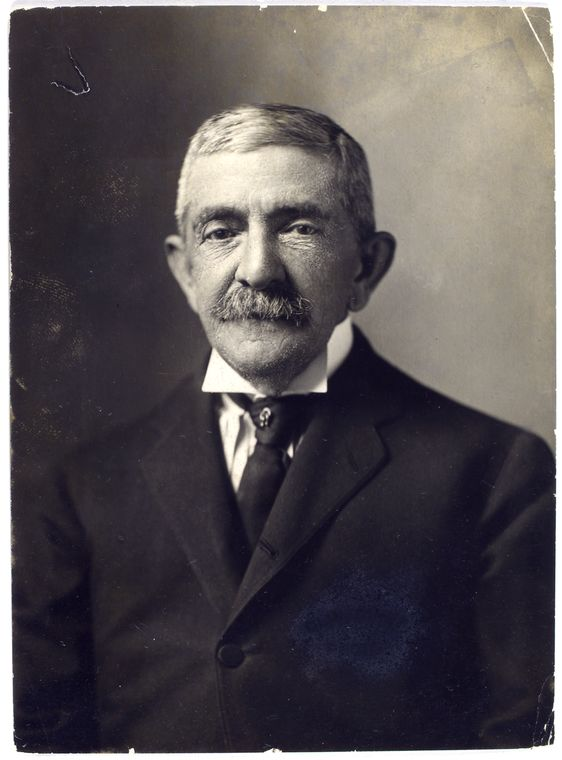
- Born: Nicholas Ephraim Young; September 12, 1840; Amsterdam, New York, U.S.
- Died: October 31, 1916 (aged 76); Washington, D.C., U.S.
- Resting place: Rock Creek Cemetery, Washington, D.C. 38.947803°N 77.011628°W
- Occupations: President, National League baseball organization (1885–1902); U.S. Treasury Department; Manager, Washington Olympics (1871–1873)
- Known for: Formation of the National Association of Professional Baseball Players in 1871

Nicholas Ephraim Young (September 12, 1840 – October 31, 1916) was an American executive, manager and umpire in professional baseball who served as president of the National League from 1885 to 1902.

Born in Amsterdam, New York at Johnson Hall, the estate of Sir William Johnson, he served in the Union Army during the Civil War, and later was employed in the U.S. Treasury Department. Young, an excellent cricket player as a young man, became a right fielder and official with a Washington, D.C. amateur baseball club. In 1871, he organized the meeting which resulted in the formation of the sport's first professional league, the National Association of Professional Baseball Players; he was named league secretary, managed the Washington team from 1871 to 1873, and also served as a league umpire.

When the National League, baseball's first major league, was formed in 1876, Young was named secretary and treasurer, posts he continued to hold until leaving office as president in 1902. Although well-liked, his tenure was marked by a tendency to acquiesce to the desires of the most powerful NL owners; league play in the 1890s increasingly tended toward rowdyism and violence on the field, and labor disputes resulted in the single year of the Players' League. Young also oversaw the NL's merger with the American Association after the 1891 season. When the American League claimed major league status in 1901, many star players and top umpires jumped to the new league after tiring of the NL's style. Resulting disputes between NL owners necessitated a change at the league level, and both Young and rival candidate Albert Spalding had to withdraw their names from consideration in the contest for the presidency. Young returned to his post with the Treasury Department; he died at age 76 in Washington.

== See also ==
- Honor Rolls of Baseball

Preceded by Abraham G. Mills	National League president 1885–1902	Succeeded by Harry Pulliam
