= Jim Holdsworth =

American baseball player (1850–1918)

- Shortstop
- Born: July 14, 1850; New York, New York, U.S.
- Died: March 22, 1918 (aged 67); New York, New York, U.S.
- Batted: Right Threw: Right

MLB debut
- May 14, 1872, for the Cleveland Forest Citys

Last MLB appearance
- June 9, 1884, for the Indianapolis Hoosiers

MLB statistics
- Games played: 319
- Runs scored: 221
- Hits: 432
- Batting average: .291
- Stats at Baseball Reference

Teams
- National Association of Base Ball Players Union of Morrisania (1870) Major leagues Cleveland Forest Citys (1872) Brooklyn Eckfords (1872) New York Mutuals (1873) Philadelphia White Stockings (1874) New York Mutuals (1875–1876) Hartford Dark Blues (1877) Troy Trojans (1882) Indianapolis Hoosiers (1884)

James Holdsworth (July 14, 1850 – March 22, 1918), nicknamed "Long Jim", was an American professional baseball player who played shortstop in Major League Baseball for seven different teams during his nine-season career from 1872 to 1884. Holdsworth died in his hometown of New York City, and is interred at Woodlawn Cemetery. He played in the National Association, National League, and briefly the American Association.

In 1877, the Brooklyn Eagle described Holdsworth as "a good honest player, an excellent bat and a fine outfielder." Holdsworth went through an elaborate wind-up in preparation to hit pitches, such that the press dubbed him "the dancing batter."

Holdsworth carries the distinction of the lowest walk rate in history; he walked just 8 times in 1,489 plate appearances. (A walk was not earned with four balls until 1889, for several years in the 1870s taking as many as nine.)

In 1885, he played for the Rochester Flour Cities of the New York State League.

After his retirement, he continued to play in old-timers' games.
