= Ed Pinkham (baseball) =

American baseball player (1846–1906)

- Third baseman
- Born: August 1846; Brooklyn, New York, U.S.
- Died: December 19, 1906 (aged 60); Brooklyn, New York, U.S.
- Batted: Unknown Threw: Left

MLB debut
- May 8, 1871, for the Chicago White Stockings

Last MLB appearance
- September 18, 1871, for the Chicago White Stockings

MLB statistics
- Batting average: .263
- Home runs: 1
- RBI: 17
- Stats at Baseball Reference

Teams
- National Association of Base Ball Players Brooklyn Eckfords (1865, 1869) Enterprise of Brooklyn (1866) Oriental of Greenpoint, New York (1867–1868) Chicago White Stockings (1870) National Association of Professional BBP Chicago White Stockings (1871)

Edwin B. Pinkham (August 1846 – December 19, 1906) was an American professional baseball player. He played one season of Major League Baseball as an infielder in 1871 for the Chicago White Stockings.

Pinkham grew up in Williamsburg, Brooklyn and enlisted as a teenager in the 47th New York Volunteer Infantry on May 27, 1862. After playing for the White Stockings, Pinkham returned to New York to raise beets.
