= Jimmy Wood =

American baseball player and manager (1842–1927)

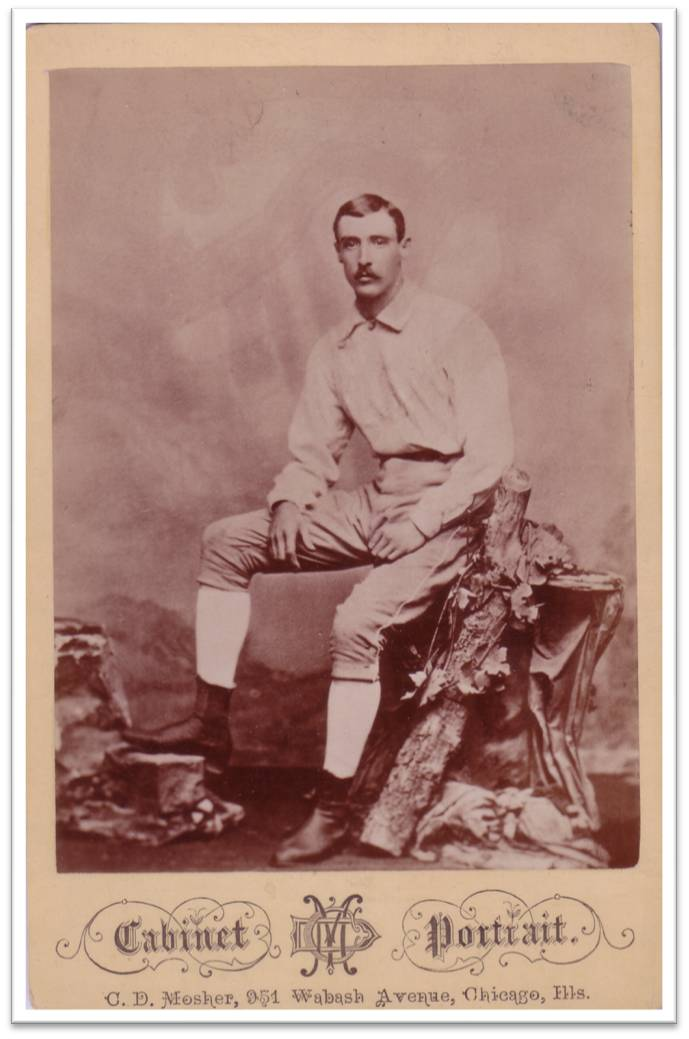
- James ("Jimmy") Leon Wood (1842–1927), in 1871
- Second baseman/Manager
- Born: December 1, 1842; Brooklyn, New York, U.S.
- Died: November 30, 1927 (aged 84); San Francisco, California, U.S.
- Batted: Unknown Threw: Right

MLB / NAPBBP debut
- May 8, 1871, for the Chicago White Stockings

Last MLB / NAPBBP appearance
- November 1, 1873, for the Philadelphia White Stockings

MLB / statistics
- Batting average: .333
- Runs scored: 162
- Runs batted in: 83
- Stats at Baseball Reference

Teams
- National Association of Base Ball Players (NAPBBP / 1871–1875) – Brooklyn Eckfords (1860–1869) Chicago White Stockings (1870) League player Chicago White Stockings (1871) Troy Haymakers (1872) Brooklyn Eckfords (1872) Philadelphia White Stockings (1873) League manager Chicago White Stockings (1871, 1874–1875) Troy Haymakers (1872) Brooklyn Eckfords (1872) Philadelphia White Stockings (1873)

James Leon Wood (December 1, 1842 – November 30, 1927) was an American second baseman and manager in early professional Major League Baseball (MLB) who hailed from Brooklyn, New York. He was the player-manager for four teams in the early National Association of Professional Base Ball Players (NAPBBP – later known as the National Association), where he spent his entire base ball career in the 1860s into the 1870s.

Wood's career in organized baseball began as early as 1860 when he began play for the Eckford of Brooklyn (also known as the Brooklyn Eckfords), with whom he played for nine seasons (1860–1869) during the following decade. For the 1871 season, he took the position of player-manager for the Chicago White Stockings, for a salary of $2,000 per year. The White Stockings eventually were renamed the Chicago Cubs, so Wood is considered the first player signed by the Cubs, their first star, and their first manager. It was with the White Stockings that he is credited for inventing the program of spring training when he moved his team down to New Orleans, Louisiana prior to the upcoming season to train in warmer weather. With Chicago having signed Wood, who had helped the Eckfords win two championships in 1862 and 1863, other star players followed, allowing Chicago to put a good team on the field in 1871.

For the 1871 season, the team became a charter member of the newly organized NAPBBP – the National Association. In late September, the Chicago team was tied with the Philadelphia Athletics for first place, with games scheduled through late October, and Chicago fans were looking forward to their first pennant. However, the Great Chicago Fire burned down most of the city on Oct. 8 and 9. One of the buildings burned was the team’s ballpark. The team finished the season on the road, with mismatched uniforms as the team’s regular apparel also had been consumed by the fire. With their homes and possessions gone and having had few opportunities for practice, and despite Wood tallying a .378 batting average, the team finished in third place — but only two games behind the first-place A’s. With the White Stockings not taking the field in 1872, Wood moved on to manage two other short term ill-fated teams; the Troy Haymakers and his old Eckford team. The next season, 1873, he managed the Philadelphia White Stockings for a year until he was able to reorganize a new Chicago team

In 1874, he tried to lance an abscess on his left leg with a pocketknife. He accidentally dropped the blade on his right leg and cut it. This caused an infection which led to an eventual amputation of the right leg. This did not end his managerial career, though; he returned to the Chicago White Stockings, and managed them for two seasons before the National Association folded in 1875. In 1876, Wood became one of the new National League's first umpires. After retiring from professional baseball and moved to Florida and began investing in citrus interests. His daughter, Carrie, married William Chase Temple, who was at one time, the owner of the Pittsburgh Pirates. It was he who the Temple Cup was named after. Wood's granddaughter, Dorothy Temple, married pitcher Del Mason. Wood's whereabouts had been debated for years until recently. In 1885, he operated a sporting goods store in Chicago. He was traced all over the United States and Canada and eventually wound up in San Francisco, where he died and is interred at Greenwood Cemetery in New Orleans.

Preceded by First manager	Chicago White Stocking Managers; 1871	Succeeded by No Team
Preceded by Bill Craver	Troy Haymakers Managers; 1872	Succeeded by Team Folded
Preceded by Jim Clinton	Brooklyn Eckfords Managers; 1872	Succeeded by Team Folded
Preceded by Fergy Malone	Philadelphia White Stocking Managers; 1873	Succeeded by Bill Craver
Preceded by Fergy Malone	Chicago White Stocking Managers; 1874–1875	Succeeded by League Folded
