= George Zettlein =

American baseball player (1844–1905)

- Pitcher / Right fielder / First baseman
- Born: July 12, 1844; Williamsburg, New York, U.S.
- Died: May 22, 1905 (aged 60); Patchogue, New York, U.S.
- Batted: Right Threw: Right

MLB debut
- May 8, 1871, for the Chicago White Stockings

Last MLB appearance
- September 16, 1876, for the Philadelphia Athletics

MLB statistics
- Win–loss record: 129–112
- Earned run average: 2.55
- Strikeouts: 143
- Stats at Baseball Reference

Teams
- Eckford of Brooklyn (NABBP) (1865); Brooklyn Atlantics (NABBP) (1866–1870); Chicago White Stockings (1871); Troy Haymakers (1872); Brooklyn Eckfords (1872); Philadelphia White Stockings (1873); Chicago White Stockings (1874–1875); Philadelphia White Stockings (1875); Philadelphia Athletics (1876); MLB records: Most innings pitched in a season with no home runs allowed: 463 1/3

George Zettlein (July 12, 1844 – May 22, 1905) was an American professional baseball pitcher, right fielder and first baseman. He played six seasons in Major League Baseball from 1871 to 1876 for the Chicago White Stockings, Troy Haymakers, Brooklyn Eckfords, Philadelphia White Stockings of the National Association (NA), and the Philadelphia Athletics (1860–1876) of the National League.

Zeittlein served in the American Civil War, in both the Army and Navy. He began playing baseball in 1865 for Eckford of Brooklyn in the National Association of Base Ball Players, the amateur-only predecessor to the NA. He joined the Brooklyn Atlantics in 1866, and remained with the team until 1870.

In 1871, Zettlein joined the professional White Stockings of the NA, and in May 1871 he gave up the new league's first home run. He gave up the league's first grand slam in September. He had a record of 18–9 with a league-leading 2.73 earned run average that year.

The following season, Zettlein played for the Troy Haymakers and Brooklyn Eckfords, combining for 15 wins and 16 losses between the two teams. He won 36 games for the Philadelphia White Stockings in 1873, then returned to the Chicago White Stockings for two seasons. Partway through the 1875 season, Zettlein rejoined the Philadelphia White Stockings, and ended his career in 1876 with the Philadelphia Athletics. He finished his major league career with 129 wins, 112 losses, and a 2.55 ERA.

Zettlein had an overpowering fastball and was regarded as one of the best pitchers of his era.

== See also ==
- List of Major League Baseball career ERA leaders
- List of Major League Baseball annual shutout leaders
