= Troy Haymakers =

Former American professional baseball team

Information
- League: National Association of Professional Base Ball Players (1871–1872)
- Location: Lansingburgh, New York
- Ballpark: Haymakers' Grounds (1871–1872)
- Founded: 1860
- Folded: 1872
- Former name: Union Base Ball Club Lansingburgh (1860–1868)
- Former league: National Amateur Association (1860–1870)
- Manager: Jimmy Wood (1872); Bill Craver (1871); Lip Pike (1871)

The Troy Haymakers were an American professional baseball team.

== History ==
Established in 1860 as the Union Base Ball Club Lansingburgh, located in neighboring Lansingburgh, New York, the Haymakers participated in the first professional pennant race of 1869 and joined the first professional league, the 1871 National Association of Professional Base Ball Players (NAPBBP). They disbanded halfway through the 1872 season "on account of an empty treasury."

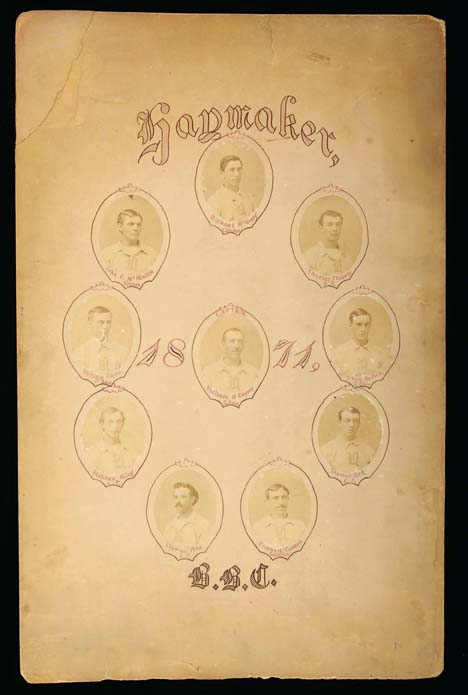
Picture of the 1871 Troy Haymakers

By 1868 the "Troy Haymakers" nickname for Union of Lansingburgh was common, although the team was sometimes called the Trojans. On the field it was one of the strongest teams in the nominally amateur National Association of Base Ball Players. Some players were from New York City; presumably the club compensated them.

When the Association permitted openly professional teams for the 1869 season, the Haymakers were one of twelve to go pro. Evidently they were fifth in playing strength for they finished with a 12–8–1 record including two wins, eight defeats, and one tie (2–8–1) against the four strongest teams and ten wins in ten matches with the others. By playing strength they ranked about the same among fifteen professional teams in 1870, at 11–13–1. During the former season, a forfeit win over the Haymakers on August 26 in Cincinnati was the only blemish on the record of the first professional team, the undefeated 1869 Red Stockings. (The Haymakers withdrew from the field with the score 17–17 in the sixth inning.)

Along with two newcomers, seven of the professional teams from 1870 established a new all-professional National Association early in 1871, known today as the first professional sports league. The rival amateur Association declined rapidly and soon left the government of baseball to the sole leadership of the professionals, but the early pros from Troy/Lansingburgh did not survive to take part.

The 1860s clubs played their games at Rensselaer Driving Park, or just Rensselaer Park. It was primarily a racetrack, bounded approximately by Whipple Avenue (now Fifth Avenue - west); Catharine Street (later 10th, now 110th - north); Middle Street (later 8th, now 108th - south); and railroad tracks (east). That general area is now occupied by residences and schools, just north of the public playground called Knickerbacker Park.

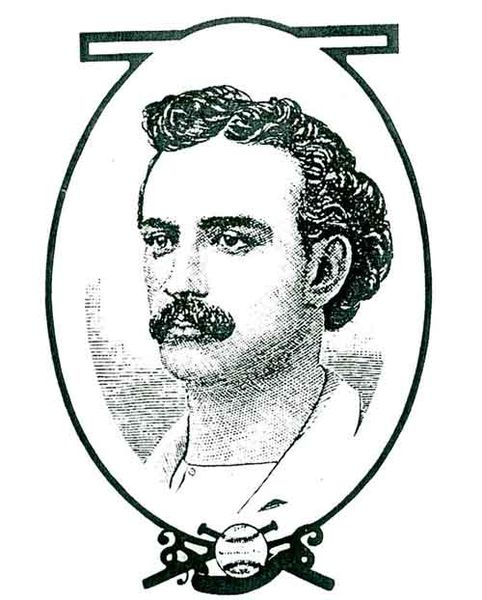
Lip Pike

During the two NAPBBP season, home games were played at Haymakers' Grounds in Troy, New York. The Haymakers were managed by Lip Pike, Bill Craver, and Jimmy Wood; they won 28 games and lost 25 for a winning percentage of .528. Their 15–10 record in 1872 was one of the best for any major team to go out of business.

In baseball history today, the 1879–1882 National League club in Troy is sometimes called the Haymakers.

There is now a team in the Albany Twilight League known as the Troy Haymakers.

== See also ==
- 1871 Troy Haymakers season
- 1872 Troy Haymakers season
