= 1870 in baseball =

== Champions ==
- National Association of Base Ball Players: Chicago White Stockings, albeit disputed by Mutual of New York

== Events ==
- June 14 – After 84 consecutive wins since assembling the first professional team in winter 1869, the Cincinnati Red Stockings lose 8–7 to the Brooklyn Atlantics before a crowd of 20,000 at the Capitoline Grounds. Bob Ferguson scores the winning run in the 11th inning on a hit by pitcher George Zettlein.
- June 20 – For the second time in three weeks the Philadelphia Athletics defeat the Brooklyn Atlantics by a 19–3 score, giving the victors possession of the championship flag.
- July 23 – The visiting Mutuals of New York defeat the Chicago White Stockings 9–0 before 5,000 spectators at Dexter Park. The shutout pitched by Rynie Wolters is the first against any NABBP championship contender, inspiring Chicago (verb) and Chicago game as lingo for shutout through the 1890s.
- July 27 – The Red Stockings lose at home for the first time in their professional era, dropping an 11–7 decision to the Athletics of Philadelphia.
- September 15 – In front of a crowd of 4,000 that paid 50¢ at the Union Grounds in Brooklyn, the New York Mutuals beat the Athletics for the second time in four weeks by a 12–11 score. This gives the Muts the temporary possession of the flag.
- November 1 – In the most controversial game since the 1860 season, the Chicago White Stockings end up on top of a 7–5 score. Leading by one run in the ninth inning, the New Yorkers walk off the field and the score reverted to the last inning completed. This is the second victory by the Chicago club over the Muts in five weeks and gives the Chicagoans the (disputed) championship for the year.
- November 21 – President Bonte recommends that the Cincinnati Base Ball Club not employ a professional nine for 1871, for that will be too expensive. The club officially dissolves that winter.

== Professional matches ==
Ten of the twelve professional clubs from 1869 remained in that field for 1870, all except Keystone of Philadelphia and Irvington, New Jersey, from Greater New York. The five newcomers were Union of Morrisania, now in New York City; Tri-Mountain of Boston; Riverside of Portsmouth, Ohio; Forest City of Rockford, Illinois; and the Chicago White Stockings, the only brand new club. Union was a founding member from the 1857 convention and Forest City had been one of the strongest amateurs remaining in 1869.

The records of the teams in professional matches, ranked by wins (see table), reveal three groups of five with sharp outlines. A big group of thirteen and a little of group of two are equally clear, considering the numbers of defeats, pro matches, and all matches (not shown), and are supported by the subsequent history.

Club	W	L	T	Comment
Mutual, New York	29	15	3	
Cincinnati Red Stockings	27	6	1	
Athletic, Philadelphia	26	11	1	
Chicago White Stockings	22	7		a brand new base ball club
Atlantic, Brooklyn	20	16		
Troy Haymakers	11	13	1	Union of Lansingburgh, New York
Olympic, Washington	10	18		
Forest City, Rockford	10	13	1	
Forest City, Cleveland	9	15		
Union, Morrisania	7	18		Union of Morrisania, Bronx
Eckford, Brooklyn	2	12	1	
Maryland, Baltimore	2	14		
National, Washington	2	9		
Riverside, Portsmouth	0	6		
Tri-Mountain, Boston	0	4		

The two more ambitious newcomers played only a few pro matches and never returned to the professional field. Mighty Cincinnati and venerable Union also shut down after this season. All the others joined the new professional association established that winter (NAPBBP), seven as founding members and four in 1872 or 1873.

The Mutuals, Athletics, and Chicago White Stockings survived to found the National League in 1876.

== Amateur clubs ==
Four amateur teams defeated professionals more than once and two of them demonstrated that they were as strong as middling pros. Harvard college fielded its strongest team, which toured nationally in the summer and won 6 of 16 against professional teams all season. Star of Brooklyn, featuring Hall of Fame pitcher Candy Cummings, won 6 of 13 against pros.

Pastime of Baltimore won 4 of 24 including 1 of 4 with the Troy Haymakers, 1 of 2 with Olympic, and 2 of 5 with Maryland. The Pastimes lost badly to Harvard and won one of three close matches with the Stars. Resolute of Elizabeth, New Jersey won 2 of 8, both at the expense of venerable Eckford; the Resolutes remained in operation until a failed venture into the professional field in 1873.

Bill Ryczek lists Lowell of Boston and the Keystone of Philadelphia (pro in 1869) among the major teams. They did not defeat any professionals but showed strength comparable to Pastime, Resolute, and the weaker pros.

Considering the professionals in three groups of five ranked by wins in pro matches (see table), the stronger pros won 37 of 41 against the six amateur teams covered here; the middling pros won 13 of 18; the weaker pros won 6 of 15.

Here are the records of those amateurs against the pros.

Pastime	4–20	Baltimore
Keystone	0–9	Philadelphia
Resolute	2–6	Elizabeth
Star	6–7	Brooklyn
Harvard	6–10	Cambridge
Lowell	0–4	Boston

One of the elite professional teams, the Athletics of Philadelphia won eight matches with Harvard, Lowell, Keystone, and Pastime, with 20 to 34 runs scored and 11- to 22-run margins. The average score was about 25 to 10.

Three amateur clubs of 1870 would later enter the all-professional National Association for one season each: Kekionga of Fort Wayne, Indiana in 1871; Mansfield of Middletown, Connecticut in 1872; Resolute of Elizabeth, New Jersey in 1873.

Harvard continued to field strong amateur teams, but amateurs would not again hold their own with middling pros. The Stars won a championship in 1871 under the new all-amateur Association (NAABBP), before Candy Cummings joined the pros in 1872.

== Births ==
- [?] – Prudencio Benavides
- January 5 – Bill Dahlen
- January 16 – Jimmy Collins
- January 22 – John B. Sheridan
- February 14 – Candy LaChance
- February 14 – Bob Quinn
- February 22 – Pussy Tebeau
- March 15 – Doc Casey
- April 9 – Ollie Pickering
- August 23 – George Davis
- September 22 – Doc Powers
- October 22 – Kid Carsey
- November 23 – Socks Seybold
- November 28 – Heinie Peitz
- November 30 – Frank Killen
- December 1 – Tommy Raub
- December 8 – William Lackey
- December 31 – Tom Connolly
