= Dexter Park =

Dexter Park may refer to:

- Dexter Park (Chicago)
- Dexter Park (Queens)
- Dexter Training Ground Park, in Providence, Rhode Island
