= Union Base-Ball Grounds =

Baseball park in Chicago, Illinois, U.S.

Coordinates: 41°53′2″N 87°37′26″W

Union Base-Ball Grounds was a baseball park located in Chicago. The park was "very visibly downtown", its small block bounded on the west by Michigan Avenue, on the north by Randolph Street, and on the east by railroad tracks and the lake shore, which was then much closer than it is today. The site is now part of Millennium Park.

== Baseball ==
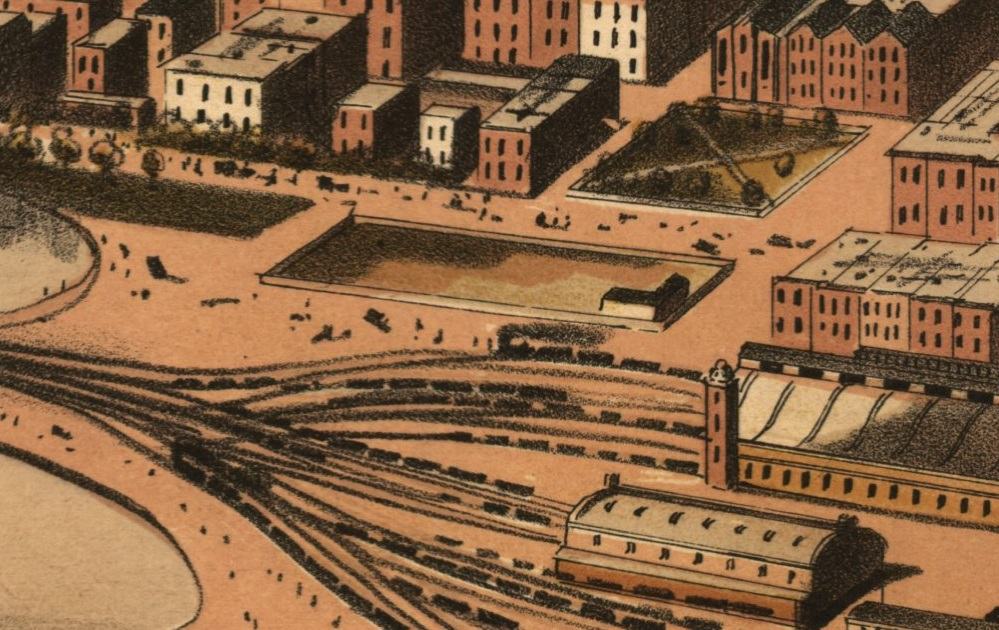
Artist's conception from an 1871 map

Union Base-Ball Grounds was also called White-Stocking Park, as it was the home field of the Chicago White Stockings of the National Association in 1871, after spending the 1870 season as an independent professional club playing home games variously at Dexter Park race course and Ogden Park. The Great Chicago Fire of October 8 destroyed Union Base-Ball Grounds and all of the club's possessions. After fulfilling its 1871 obligations by playing on the road, the club did not field a team for the next two seasons, and the ballpark was not rebuilt.

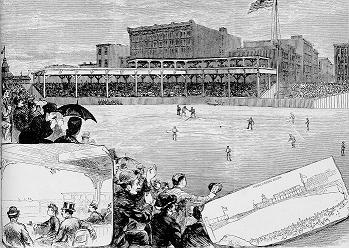
Lake-Shore Park 1883; Interstate Exposition Building visible in left background

In 1878, the White Stockings returned to the 1871 site and to a new park that is usually called Lake-Shore Park, Lake Front Park, or simply Lake Park, which was actually the name for the entire waterfront area (not just the ballpark) until being renamed Grant Park in 1901. At the new park, the outfield area was especially close in right field. The right field fence was less than 200 feet away, so anyone hitting the ball over that fence was awarded only a ground rule double. Batters would aim for the fence, and during their years at the park, the Chicago club regularly led the league in doubles. In what would be their final season on the lakefront, the White Stockings decided to make the entire outfield fence home run territory. Thus, the team slumped in the number of doubles while boosting their home runs from typically a dozen or two to 142, easily outdistancing second place Buffalo, which had 39 for the season. The entire league's home run totals were up, thanks to the change to the Chicago ground rules.

The team played at Lake-Shore Park through the 1884 season. After the season, the city reclaimed the land, and the White Stockings became a road team for the first couple of months of 1885 while awaiting construction of the first West Side Park. The lumber from the stands was disassembled and reconfigured as the new stands at West Side Park.

== Football ==
The first college football game in the Midwest was played at the park on May 30, 1879 (Decoration Day), when the University of Michigan met Racine College. Michigan won, 1-0, on a place-kick by David DeTarr. The game was played using modified Rugby football rules.

== Other events ==
In August, 1879, the National Archery Association in their inaugural year held a series of events and demonstrations of the sport of archery, at White Stocking Park [sic].

== Legacy ==
The site of the former ballpark is now the part of Millennium Park known as Wrigley Square. It was established by the Wrigley Company Foundation in 2001, to honor private sector donations to Millennium Park.

Preceded by Ogden Park & Dexter Park; 23rd Street Grounds	Home of the Chicago White Stockings; 1871; 1878 – 1884	Succeeded by 23rd Street Grounds; West Side Park
