= Ogden Park =

Recreational facility in Chicago, Illinois

Coordinates: 41°53′36″N 87°37′23″W

Ogden Park, also known as Ogden Skating Park, was a recreational facility on the near north side of Chicago around the 1860s and 1870s. It was home to the Ogden Skating Club. It was on a piece of land east of where Ontario Street (at that time) T-ed into Michigan Avenue. Today's Ontario Street continues several blocks eastward, through the site of that old park.

The first newspaper references to the park and the skating club appear in local newspapers in 1861, where its location was termed "the foot of Ontario Street". City directories for 1867 and 1869-70 give the location of "Ogden Skating Park" as "Ontario, corner Seneca." Seneca Street was one block east of St. Clair Street and two blocks east of Pine Street, which later became part of the extended Michigan Avenue. Seneca ran between Ontario Street and Illinois Street. It was erased as the land was developed. References to the park appear to cease after 1870. It was, of course, inside the burn zone of the Great Chicago Fire in the fall of 1871.

With no skating possible in the summer, baseball games were played at the park. Most of them were between local amateur ball clubs, but there were occasional professional games. On July 31, 1869, the park was the neutral site for a match between the Cincinnati Red Stockings and the Rockford Forest Citys. The Reds won 53-32. The game was close until Cincinnati score 19 in the sixth inning and 10 in the seventh. Several players on the teams, including Rockford pitcher Albert Spalding, would later become stars for Chicago.

During 1870 the park was rented to the professional, then-independent baseball club, the Chicago White Stockings, as a practice field and for a number of regulation games, usually against local or lesser-known opponents, or sometimes even college teams.

Most of the ball club's "legitimate" games (as the Chicago Tribune termed them), against national professional teams (many of which would turn up in the National Association the following year) were held at the Dexter Park race track near the stockyards.

Overall, the White Stockings played about half their games at each venue, during a home season that ranged from late May to mid-November.

== Sources ==
- Archives of the Chicago Tribune.

| Preceded by None | Home of the Chicago White Stockings (with Dexter Park); 1870 | Succeeded by Union Base-Ball Grounds |
