= History of the Chicago Cubs =

The following is a franchise history of the Chicago Cubs of Major League Baseball, a charter member of the National League who started play in the National Association of Base Ball Players in 1870 as the Chicago White Stockings, before joining the National Association in 1871. The Chicago National League Ball Club is the only franchise to play continuously in the same city since the formation of the National League in 1876. They are the earliest formed active professional sports club in North America, predating the team now known as the Atlanta Braves by one year. In their early history, they were called the White Stockings, Orphans, Infants, Remnants and Colts by the press before officially becoming the "Cubs" in 1903.

Chicago Cubs logos

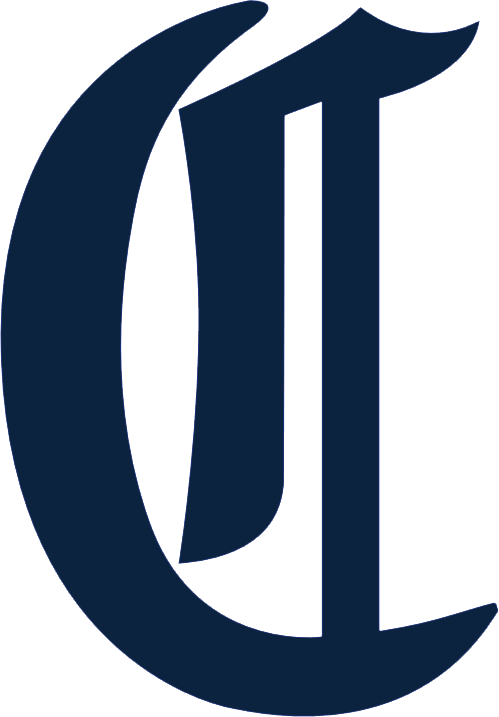
1903–05

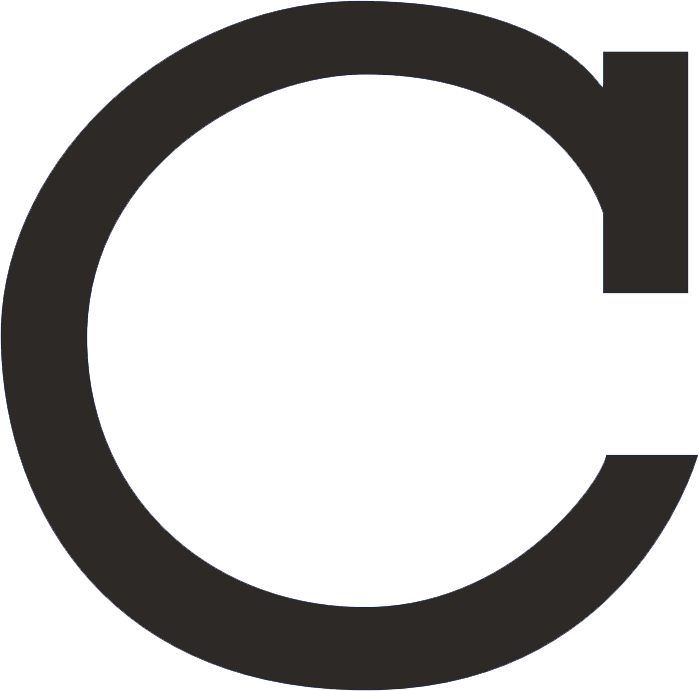
1906

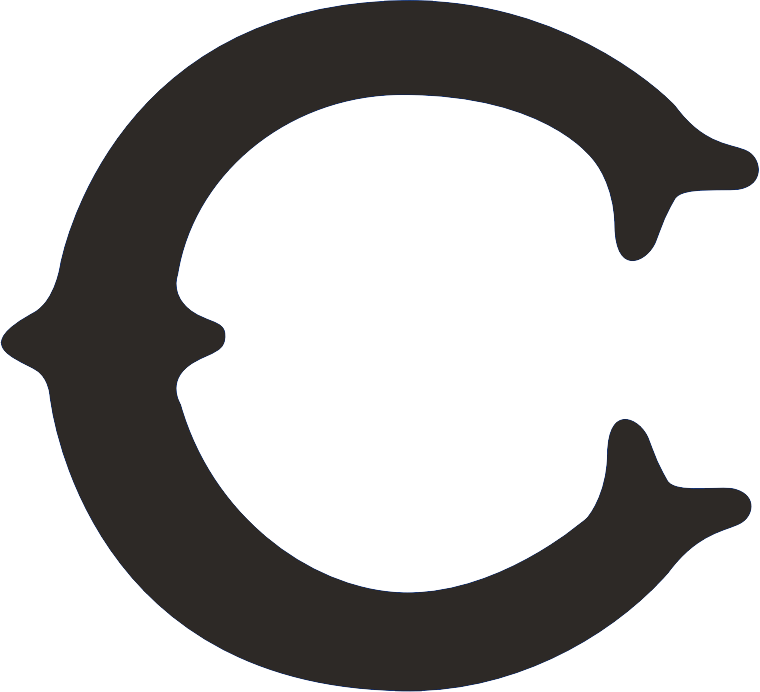
1907

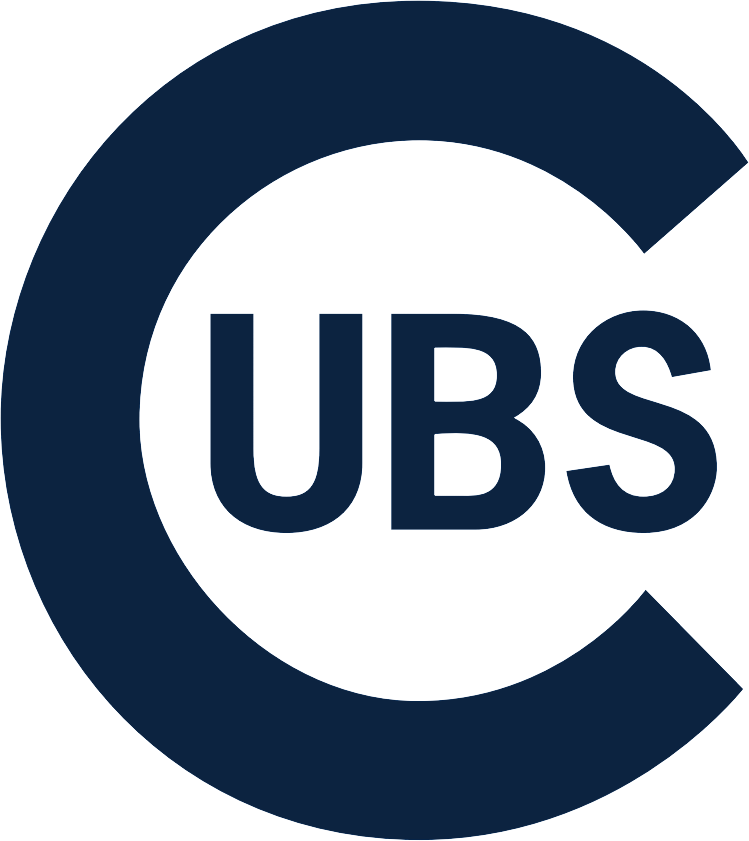
1909–1910

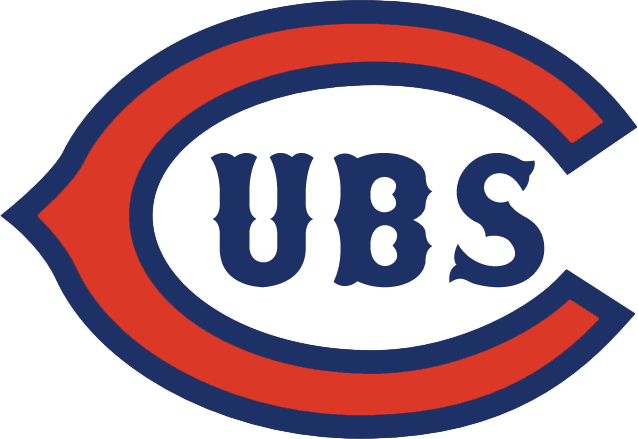
1919–1926

1927–1936

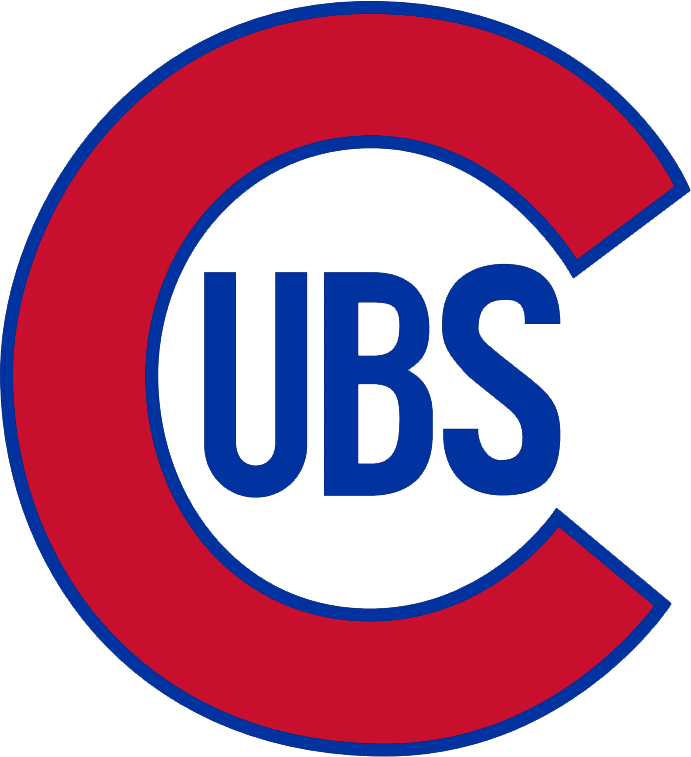
1937–1940

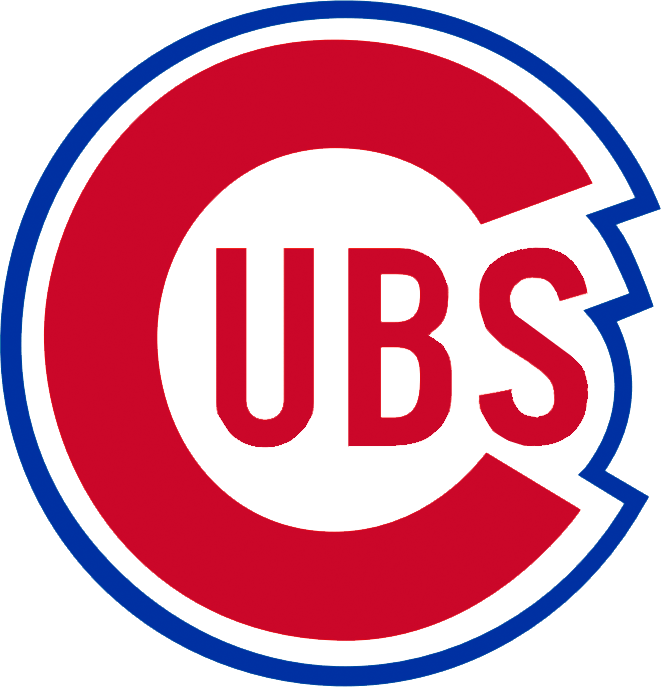
1941–1956

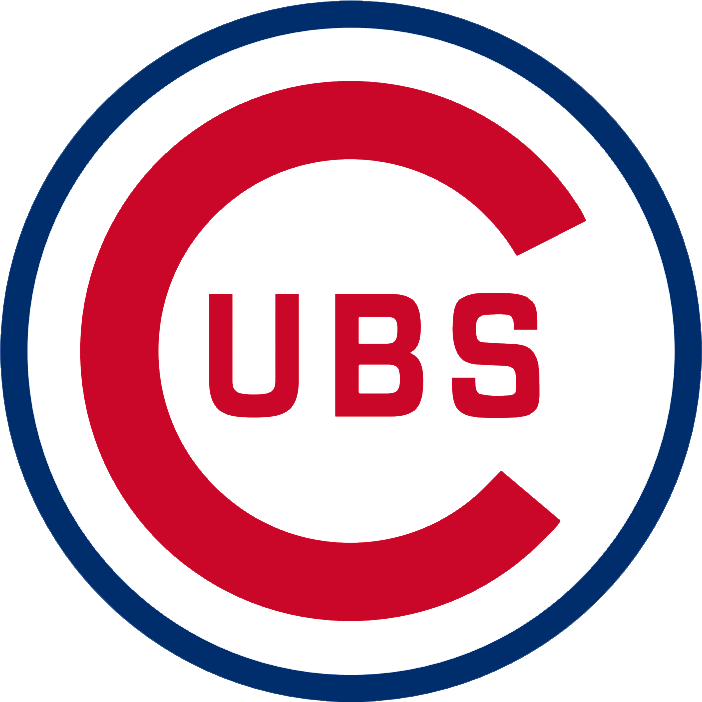
1957–1978

1979–present

== Chicago White Stockings/Chicago Colts ==
=== 1870: The Chicago White Stockings Base Ball Club ===
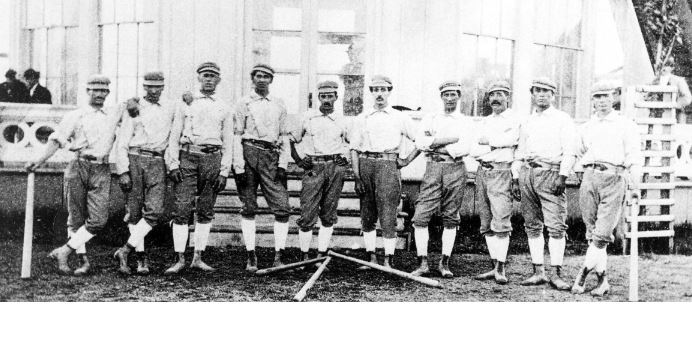
1870 Chicago White Stockings (later Cubs): (l-r) Ned Cuthbert, Fred Treacey, Charlie Hodes, Levi Meyerle, Ed Pinkham, Jimmy Wood, Bub McAtee, Bill Craver, Marshall King, Clipper Flynn

The success and fame won by the Brooklyn Atlantics, organized baseball's first true dynasty, and the Cincinnati Red Stockings (c. 1867–1870) baseball's first openly all-professional team, led to a minor explosion of other openly professional clubs by the late 1860s, each with the singular goal of defeating the Red Stockings, who had accumulated an unparalleled 89-game winning streak. It was common at the time for sportswriters to refer to teams by their uniform colors, and it happens that Chicago's club, which was officially known as The Chicago Base Ball Club, adopted white and were immediately tagged by reporters "White Stockings" (or occasionally "Whites"). On April 29, 1870, the Chicago White Stockings played their first game against the Union Club of St. Louis, and soundly defeated the Unions 7–1. The White Stockings divided their games between their downtown practice field, Ogden Park, and a larger facility set up at Dexter Park where they hosted games expected to draw larger crowds.

After some individually arranged contests, using mostly the same roster, Chicago managed to put together a 10-man roster and joined the nation's top organized league, which was now allowing entry to professionals. This league, known as the National Association of Base Ball Players, had been primarily dominated by the Atlantics and until very recently before the admitting of the Red Stockings and the White Stockings, had consisted of mostly baseball clubs from the New York, Philadelphia, Baltimore, and Washington, D.C. areas. Despite this East Coast dominance, Chicago won the NABBP championship that year, although the title was disputed by the opposing club, the New York Mutuals.

=== 1871–1875: William Hulbert and the National Association ===
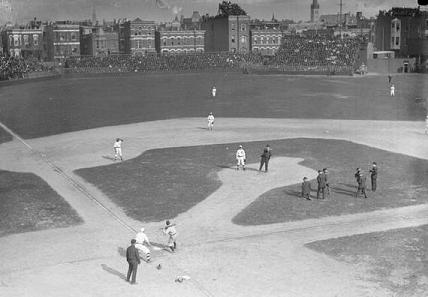
West Side Grounds served as the club's home for nearly 30 years.

The following season, the time was right for the formation of the very first all-professional league, and thus the National Association of Professional Base Ball Players was born, and the White Stockings, financed by businessman William Hulbert, became charter members of the new league. After their experiment with a race track in 1870, the White Stockings returned to the downtown for 1871, a decision that would prove fateful.

The club arranged with the city to build a ballpark in the northeast corner of the public park then known as Lake Park, later named Grant Park. The venue was dubbed the Union Base-Ball Grounds, and the club was a close contender for the pennant until late in the season. On Sunday, October 8, the Great Chicago Fire erupted on the near south side and swept northward through the downtown. The wooden ballpark was right in the firestorm's path, and the grounds and all the team's equipment and uniforms were consumed.

Despite that disaster, the White Stockings played their 1871 season to completion, on the road, in borrowed uniforms. They managed to finish second, just 2 games short of the title that was won by Philadelphia. Despite the strong finish, the club was compelled to drop out of the league during the city's recovery period until ultimately being revived in 1874, and moving into the newly built 23rd Street Grounds on the near south side.

Although the original Red Stockings had disbanded after 1870, many of the players became members of a new club wearing similar uniforms, but now based in Boston. Over the next four seasons, the Boston Red Stockings dominated the National Association and hoarded the game's best stars, even those under contract with other teams. Hulbert, the White Stockings club president, was disgusted by the lack of enforceable contracts (the most famous of these "contract jumpers" or "revolvers" was Davy Force) as well as the monopoly of the Boston club and the league's inability to enforce a mandatory schedule. Gambling and alcohol were also seen as serious problems, with games too often being suspected of being "thrown". As a result, Hulbert spearheaded the formation of a new, stronger, more ethical organization. During the last years of the NA, Hulbert worked behind the scenes, to convince the owners of the St. Louis Browns, Hartford Dark Blues, Philadelphia Athletics, and a few others to join the White Stockings in his new league, which would be known as the National League of Professional Base Ball Clubs. The National League's formation meant the end of the NA, as its remaining clubs shut down or reverted to amateur or minor status.

=== 1876–1900: The National League ===
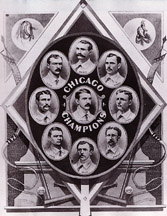
The 1876 White Stockings won the N.L.'s first pennant.

After the 1875 season ended, Hulbert was principal in the acquisition of several key players, including Boston pitcher Albert Spalding and first baseman Adrian Anson of the Philadelphia Athletics. The club continued to play its home games at 23rd Street.

With the pieces in place, the Chicago National League Ball Club quickly established themselves as one of the new National League's top teams. Spalding won 47 games that season, and James "Deacon" White and Ross Barnes, also brought in by Hulbert, were major contributors as well, as Barnes hit .429 that season and White, one of the last great bare-handed catchers, led the league in RBI. Spalding pitched the league's first shutout. The White Stockings cruised through the National League's inaugural season of 1876, winning the league's first championship.

Near the end of the season, Mutual of New York and Athletic of Philadelphia, who were remnants of the NA, dropped out of contention and refused to play the remainder of their respective schedules. Hulbert flexed his executive muscle, expelling both franchises from the league.

Despite Hulbert's attempt to make Chicago the overpowering team that Boston had been during the NA years, the next season found Chicago finishing a disappointing 5th in the 6 team league, behind a resurgent Boston entry (another NA carryover) in the 60-game season. In 1878, the club arranged with the city to build a new Lake Park ballpark in essentially the same place as the 1871 ballpark. Chicago improved over the next two seasons as the schedules grew to around 75 or more games.

In 1880 the White Stockings won 67 and lost 17, for an all-time NL record .798 winning percentage.

==== Cap Anson and a Chicago dynasty ====
Cap Anson, who played a record 27 straight seasons, was inducted into the Hall of Fame in 1939.

Adrian Anson, the team's best player and perhaps the greatest ballplayer in the early era of professional baseball, became the club's captain, and was so much identified as the face of the club he became better known as Cap Anson. After the 1876 pennant, which at the time was the game's top prize, Anson led the team to a great amount of success in the early seasons of the National League, winning pennants in 1880 and 1881 as well. The length of the season and long travel times between games at the time was such that most teams got by with two principal starters, and Chicago had two very good ones in Larry Corcoran and Fred Goldsmith. Corcoran, who won 43 games in 1880, threw three no-hitters in the early part of the decade, a record that would stand until being broken by Sandy Koufax in 1965. Goldsmith is one of two pitchers credited with the invention of the curveball. The two were baseball's first true "pitching rotation".

In 1882, Hulbert died suddenly, and Al Spalding, who had retired a few years earlier to start Spalding sporting goods, assumed ownership of the club, with Anson acting as first baseman and manager. That season was also the first for the American Association, the self-proclaimed "beer and whiskey league", which began play as a second "major league". The AA offered alcohol and Sunday games, moves which forced the more traditional NL into changes that likely would not have been made had Hulbert lived. Chicago played an (unauthorized) two-game post-season series against the AA champions, the Cincinnati Reds. Each team won one of the two games.

The White Stockings slipped a bit in 1883, finishing four games behind Boston. For 1884, the club made a ground rules change at their home ballpark. Its dimensions, especially right field, were very cozy, perhaps less than 200 feet (61 m) from home plate. Fly balls hit over the right field fence were previously ruled doubles, but in 1884 they were to be ruled as home runs. The batters began aiming for right field, and set some very dubious home run records that would last for decades until the modern "lively ball" era began. This change hurt more than it helped, as the club finished 22 games off the pace.

For 1885, the city reclaimed its lakefront land, and the club went looking for a new home. They found a lot available on the near west side and began building, finally opening "West Side Park I" in June. The White Stockings, despite being vagabonds for their first two months, played strong and won the NL pennant by two games over the New York Giants. Meanwhile, the St. Louis Browns easily won the first of what would prove to be four consecutive pennants as they dominated the AA.

Chicago appeared ready to return to the top in 1885. The "Chicago Stone Wall", the greatest infield of its day, was in place, anchored by Anson and Ned Williamson, who hit 27 home runs in 1884 (25 at home, 2 on the road), a record which would stand until being broken by Babe Ruth in 1919. King Kelly was the best catcher in the league and Corcoran was primary pitcher, but John Clarkson, a product of an Anson scouting trip, would lead Chicago to yet another pennant. Much has been written about Old Hoss Radbourn's record 60 victories for the Providence Grays of 1884, but Clarkson won an amazing 53 games in 1885, despite being second to Corcoran in the rotation. Anson considered the 1885–86 teams the best he managed.

During this period, Anson became the first ballplayer credited with achieving 3,000 hits. Anson's actual number of hits varies depending on the source. MLB itself recognizes Anson as having over 3,000 hits. His run producing prowess led the Chicago Tribune to propose a new stat, runs-batted-in. It would take years to become official, but research would reveal that Anson led the N.L. in RBI eight times, still the major league record. Anson's influence on the team is likely greater than that of any other single player's influence on any professional sports team, perhaps only rivaled by what Ruth would eventually become to the New York Yankees three decades later. Anson's mark was so deep that by the mid-1890s sportswriters had dropped the White Stockings name in favor of the Chicago Colts, or more commonly, Anson's Colts.

Anson is also given the credit, or the blame, for setting the stage for the longest-lasting version of the "color line" barring African-Americans from major league baseball. In an August 10, 1883, exhibition game against the then-independent Toledo Blue Stockings, who would before the next season join the American Association, Anson refused to field his team as long as Toledo's catcher Moses Walker, who was black, was in the lineup; Anson claimed that Walker was ineligible to play, because the rules then in effect permitted only gentlemen to play, and Walker as a black person was incapable of satisfying the definition of a "gentlem[a]n". The umpires disagreed and threatened both to grant the Blue Stockings a victory by forfeit and to deprive Anson and his team of their share of the day's ticket sales unless Anson and his team took the field. Anson relented and the game went on with Walker in the Toledo lineup, but in an 1884 game against Toledo, by now affiliated with the AA and playing as the Mudhens, Anson held his line and insisted that the arrangements for the game include a provision excluding black players from both teams' lineups. By the 1897 season, the leagues adopted an agreement that neither they nor their minor-league affiliates would admit black players, establishing a racial barrier in professional baseball for the next half-century.

A post-season "World's Championship Series" had been held in 1884 between the champions of the League (Providence) and the Association (Metropolitan), and the White Stockings and the Browns arranged to continue that new tradition in 1885. This was the first meeting between Chicago and the St. Louis franchise that would eventually join the NL and become known as the St. Louis Cardinals. The two clubs remain perennial rivals.

The 1885 Series ended in dispute and with no clear resolution. Both clubs faced each other again in 1886, and this time around there was no question about the outcome, with the Browns winning the Series four games to two. This marked the only AA win in the 19th Century World Series contests.

Things changed with time for the White Stockings / Colts. Following Chicago's great run during the 1880s, the on-field fortunes of Anson's Colts dwindled during the mid-1890s, despite the emergence of Bill Lange, who set the club record for steals with 84 in 1897, and was one of the league's best hitters for seven seasons. The club would have to await revival under new leadership, however, for in 1898, Spalding opted not to renew Anson's contract, and a year later Lange retired to become a professional scout.

=== Transition ===
Baseball's popularity in general faded somewhat during the 1890s. In an apparent effort to boost attendance, in 1891 the Colts began splitting their schedule between West Side Park and the recently built South Side Park. In 1892 they played their entire schedule on the south side, but decided to move more toward the city center again. Early in the 1893 season they opened "West Side Park II", a wooden structure that would be their home for the next 23 seasons.

Anson's departure led to the team's nickname transitioning through the next few seasons. With the loss of their "Pop" as Anson had become known, at times the media referred to the club as the Remnants or the Orphans. The "Colts" name remained in circulation through the 1905 season, along with Orphans and Remnants, depending on which newspaper or fan one spoke to. The name "Cubs" first appeared in print in 1902 and gained popularity over the next four years, before becoming the primary nickname in 1906 and acknowledged by the team itself in its 1907 World Series programs; the Cub-in-the-C logo first appeared on uniforms in 1908 and the name "Cubs" the following year. With the purchase of the Cubs in 1906 by Charles Murphy, some local newspapers began calling the team "Murphy's Spuds", or just "the Spuds". That playful nickname eventually faded. The old name, Chicago White Stockings, was adopted in 1900 by the new American Base Ball League entry on Chicago's south side, initially as a minor league entry. The AL turned major in 1901, and the south siders' adopted nickname was soon shortened by the press to Chicago White Sox.

== Early MLB years (dead-ball era) ==
=== 1901–1913: A new Cubs dynasty ===
After the formation of the American League, Al Spalding gave up ownership of the club to concentrate on touring the country to promote his sporting goods company, selling the team to John Hart in 1902. Oddly, the team Spalding put together before he left was one of his grandest accomplishments. Joe Tinker (shortstop), Johnny Evers (second baseman), and Frank Chance (first baseman) were three Hall-of-Fame Cubs infielders who played together from 1903 to 1912. They, along with third baseman Harry Steinfeldt and catcher Johnny Kling, formed the infield on what would become one of the most dominant baseball teams of all time.

By 1905 the Cubs were owned by Charles Murphy, who purchased the franchise for $125,000, equivalent to $4.48 million in 2025. Chance took over as manager for the ailing Frank Selee in that year, and the Cubs responded by winning four pennants and two World Series titles over a five-year span. Their record of 116 victories (in a 154-game season) in 1906 has not been broken, though it was tied by the Seattle Mariners in 2001 in a 162-game season. The 1906 Cubs still hold the record for best winning percentage of the modern era, with a .763 mark. However, they lost the 1906 World Series to their crosstown rival White Sox.

The Cubs again relied on dominant pitching during this period, featuring hurlers such as Mordecai "Three-Finger" Brown, Jack Taylor, Ed Reulbach, Jack Pfiester and Orval Overall. The Cubs' pitchers posted a record for lowest staff earned run average that still stands today. Reulbach threw a one-hitter in the 1906 World Series, one of a small handful of twirlers to pitch low-hit games in the post-season. Brown acquired his unique and indelicate nickname from having lost most of his index finger in farm machinery when he was a youngster. This gave him the ability to put a natural extra spin on his pitches, which often frustrated opposing batters.

In 1907, the Cubs won 107 games, dominating the National League once again. That year they met Ty Cobb and the Detroit Tigers in the World Series, beating them 4–1 for the franchise's first World Series championship. At the time a tie was replayed the next day from the beginning but counted in the series score, so officially the series was not a sweep.

On September 23, 1908, the Cubs and New York Giants, involved in a tight pennant race, were tied in the bottom of the ninth inning at the Polo Grounds. The Giants had runners of first and third and two outs when Al Bridwell hit a single to center field, scoring Moose McCormick from third with the Giants' apparent winning run, but the runner on first base, rookie Fred Merkle, went halfway to second and then sprinted to the clubhouse after McCormick touched home plate. As fans swarmed the field, Evers retrieved the ball and touched second. A forceout was called at second base and, since there were two outs, this ending the inning, negating McCormick's score from third. As the crowd was swarming the field and the players had decamped to their respective clubhouses, the umpires were unable to resume play and the game was declared a tie. The game went down in history as "Merkle's Boner". Because of the tie, the Giants and Cubs ended up tied for first place. The Giants lost the league's first one-game playoff, and the Cubs went on to the World Series, where they defeated the Tigers once again, this time four games to one, for their second consecutive World Series championship. It would be their last World Series victory for 108 years.

==== Tinker to Evers to Chance ====
Some experts believe the Cubs could have been in the Series for five straight seasons had Johnny Kling not sat out the entire 1909 season. Kling temporarily retired to play professional pocket billiards, but his primary reason for not playing was most likely a contract dispute. His absence obviously hurt the stability of the pitching staff, as when he returned in 1910 the Cubs won the pennant again, although the veteran club was unable to defeat the young Philadelphia Athletics in the Fall Classic.

During that 1910 season, the club's star infielders, Tinkers, Evers, and Chance, gained even more national acclaim after turning a critical double play against the New York Giants in a July game. The trio was immortalized in Franklin P. Adams' poem Baseball's Sad Lexicon, which first appeared in the July 18, 1910, edition of the New York Evening Mail:

These are the saddest of possible words:
"Tinker to Evers to Chance."
Trio of bear cubs, and fleeter than birds,
Tinker and Evers and Chance.
Ruthlessly pricking our gonfalon bubble,
Making a Giant hit into a double--
Words that are heavy with nothing but trouble:
"Tinker to Evers to Chance."

"Gonfalon" is a poetic way of referring to the pennant that both clubs battled for. The expression "Tinker to Evers to Chance" is still used today in American English and means "well-oiled routine" or a "sure thing".

Tinker and Evers reportedly could not stand each other and rarely spoke off the field. Evers, a high-strung, argumentative man, suffered a nervous breakdown in 1911 and rarely played that year. Chance suffered a near-fatal beaning the same year. The trio played together little after that. In 1913, Chance went to manage the New York Yankees and Tinker went to Cincinnati to manage the Reds, and that was the end of one of the most notable infields in baseball. They were inducted into the Baseball Hall of Fame together in 1946. Tinker and Evers reportedly became amicable in their old age, with the baseball wars far behind them.

=== 1914–1924: Lasker, Weeghman, and the double-Bills ===
The Cubs fell into a lengthy doldrum after the departure of their stars. In 1916, advertising executive Albert Lasker and his partner Charles Phelps Taft obtained a large block of shares and soon acquired majority ownership of the Cubs. In 1916 Taft was bought out by Charlie Weeghman, who had owned the Chicago Whales of the short-lived Federal League, and was proprietor of a popular chain of lunch counters.

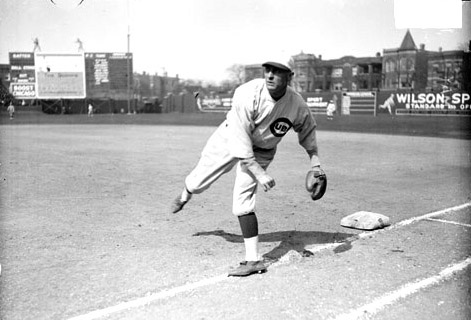
Cubs right fielder Max Flack, c. 1920. Note the Doublemint "elves" atop the scoreboard, and the Wilson Sporting Goods sign on the right field wall.

Weeghman and Lasker moved the Cubs to the Whales' old home, Weeghman Park, in 1916. The club was soon playing competitively again, and won the NL pennant in the war-shortened season of 1918, where they played a part in another team's curse, Curse of the Bambino. In the 1918 World Series, the North Siders, led by pitcher Grover Cleveland Alexander, posted the majors' best record at 84–45 that year, and faced the Boston Red Sox. Babe Ruth won two games in the series, including a 1–0 complete-game shutout in the opener to start off what would be a six-game Boston triumph. Ruth was sold to the Yankees a year later, starting the Red Sox' own tale of futility which lasted for 86 years. The 1918 Series was poorly attended and there were rumblings that it was "fixed", but with America's energy focused on World War I, nothing came of these suspicions.

Following the 1919 Black Sox Scandal, which led to yet another "curse" on the south side of Chicago, baseball in the city fell into very dark times and Lasker worked to create a new governing authority for Major League Baseball that led to Judge Kenesaw Mountain Landis becoming the first Commissioner of Baseball. By then, Weeghman was out of the picture. His lunch counter business fell on hard times after the war, and he was forced to sell more and more stock to Lasker's friend, chewing gum magnate William Wrigley Jr. By 1918, Weeghman had sold his remaining stock to Wrigley. In 1921, Wrigley bought Lasker's controlling stake as well.

== 1925–1946: Early Wrigley years ==
=== Every three years ===
After buying the rest of Lasker's shares, Wrigley changed the name of the team's home ballpark to Wrigley Field in 1925 in order to generate more exposure for his brand of chewing gum. This is one of the earliest examples of corporate sponsorship. Wrigley also acquired the services of astute baseball man William Veeck, Sr., appointing him as club president. Veeck had been a sportswriter, and had criticized Cubs management. In an unusual move, Wrigley challenged Veeck to see if he could do better. It proved to be a good move.

With Wrigley's money and Veeck's savvy, the Cubs were soon back in business in the National League, the front office having built a team that would be strong contenders for the next decade. Hack Wilson, Gabby Hartnett, Billy Herman, Rogers Hornsby, and many other stars donned Cub uniforms during that stretch, and they achieved the unusual accomplishment of winning a pennant every three years – 1929, 1932, 1935 and 1938. Unfortunately, their success did not extend to the post-season, as they fell to their American League rivals each time, often in humiliating fashion. One example was in game 4 of the 1929 World Series when the Cubs, leading 8–0 at the time, yielded 10 runs to the Philadelphia Athletics in the seventh inning. A key play in that inning was center fielder Hack Wilson losing a fly ball in the sun, resulting in a 3-run inside-the-park homer.

In the 1932 World Series, Babe Ruth again torched the North Siders, though this time with his bat, when he led New York in a series in which he hit his famous "called shot" home run in Chicago during Game 3. The Yankees then went on to a four-game sweep of the Northsiders. There were some historic moments for the Cubs as well, as they won the 1935 pennant in thrilling fashion. Billy Herman hit a career best .341 and led the Cubs to 21 straight wins in September, which propelled the club to the 1935 World Series where they fell to Hank Greenberg's Detroit Tigers in a hard-fought, 6-game series.

The 1938 season saw Dizzy Dean lead the team's pitching staff and provided an historic moment when they won a crucial, late-season game with a "walk-off" home run by player-manager Gabby Hartnett, which became known in baseball folklore as "The Homer in the Gloamin'." However, Chicago fell to the Yankees again in the 1938 World Series. By this time, the 'double-Bills' had both died, and the front office, now under P.K. Wrigley, was unable to rekindle the success his father had created, and so the team would slip into its first period of mediocrity.

=== The Curse of the Billy Goat ===
The Cubs enjoyed one more pennant, at the close of another World War, led by outfielder Andy Pafko and infielder Phil Cavarretta. Due to the wartime travel restrictions, the first three games were played in Detroit, where the Cubs won two of them, and the last four were to be played at Wrigley. The Cubs won Game 1 9–0 and Claude Passeau tossed a one hitter in Game 3 to give the Northsiders a 2–1 advantage as the series shifted to Wrigley Field.

In Game 4, the Curse of the Billy Goat was laid upon the Cubs when Philip K. Wrigley ejected Billy Sianis, who had come to the game with two box seat tickets, one for him and one for his goat. They paraded around for a few innings, but ultimately Wrigley demanded the goat leave the park due to complaints about its unpleasant odor. Upon his ejection, an angry Sianis uttered, "the Cubs, they ain't gonna win no more", and his family said he then sent a telegram to the Cubs owner saying that they would never win another Pennant or World Series. The Cubs lost game 4, and despite a heroic series by Cavarretta, lost the 1945 World Series in seven games. Although the Cubs occasionally appeared in post-season series since divisional play began in 1969, they did not win a Pennant or win a World Series again until 2016.

The 1945 season actually followed five consecutive losing seasons, as if a curse had already started. From 1940 to 1992, over 53 seasons, the Cubs posted only 11 winning seasons, and six of them were consecutive from 1967 to 1972, during which the career of "Mr. Cub", Ernie Banks, ended.

== 1947–1981: Late Wrigley years ==
=== 1947–1981: The dark ages ===
After the Curse of the Billy Goat, a few years into the post-World War II era, astute observers of the game began to suspect that something had gone wrong with the Cubs franchise, and that it might take them a long time to recover. In his 1950 book The World Series and Highlights of Baseball, LaMont Buchanan wrote the following prose next to photos of Wrigley (apparently taken during the 1945 World Series) and of their newly hired manager:

"From the sublime to last place!
Wrigley Field, the ivy of its walls still whispering of past greatness,
Watches its Cubs grow less ferocious in '47, '48, '49.
New doctor of the cure is smiling Frank Frisch,
Veteran of previous baseball transfusions who thinks,
It's nice to have the fans with you.'
Chicago has a great baseball tradition.
The fans remember glorious yesterdays as they wait for brighter tomorrows.
And eventually their Cubs will bite again!"

Little did anyone realize how long "eventually" would turn out to be. After losing the 1945 World Series, the Cubs finished 82–71, good for third place in 1946, but did not enter post-season play. The following year, however, the Cubs slumped to 69–85 and sixth place.

The Cubs would spend most of the next two decades buried deep in the bottom half of the National League. From 1947 to 1966, the Cubs only managed a .500 record twice. Many of those teams lost over 90 games, and in 1962 and 1966 they lost over 100. All this futility came despite the excellent play of shortstop Ernie Banks, who became known as "Mr. Cub". Finding help for Banks, however, turned out to be the team's downfall. Players such as Hank Sauer and Ralph Kiner found only temporary homes in Chicago during the early 1950s, and Phil Cavarretta's numbers tailed off late in his career. Incidentally, Cavarretta, who played 20 seasons for the Cubs and had been player/manager, was fired during spring training of 1954 after admitting the team was unlikely to finish above 5th place (they finished 7th).

One of Wrigley's attempts to right the ship actually set the team further back. In December 1960, he announced the Cubs would no longer have a manager. Instead, an eight-member "College of Coaches" would run the club. The eight men would rotate all the way through the Cubs organization, so that every player from Class D (equivalent to today's Rookie Leagues) on up would learn a standard system of play. Each coach would serve as "head coach" of the Cubs during his tenure there.

This approach could be considered visionary in that it anticipated the coaching specialization that has evolved in the modern game. However, this experiment proved to be poorly executed. There was no real pattern to the rotation, and each coach brought a different playing style. Some talent finally returned to the North Side during this era, in the form of third baseman Ron Santo and outfielder Billy Williams (the 1961 National League Rookie of the Year). However, without consistent leadership in the dugout, the Cubs remained buried in the second division. They only had one winning record during the four-year experiment, never finished higher than 7th, and got no closer than 17 games out of first. This stretch also saw some of the worst teams in Cubs history; the 1962 season, for instance, saw the team lose 103 games – the most in franchise history. There was also a racial factor in the rotation, as Buck O'Neil was one of the coaches but was never promoted to the "head coach" position. Wrigley finally relented and named one person as sole "head coach" in 1963, but did not completely scrap the experiment until Leo Durocher took over in 1966 and emphatically declared himself manager, with Wrigley's support.

In the mid-1960s, the Cubs began showing signs of life, sparked by Banks, Williams, and Santo and the emergence of ace pitcher Ferguson Jenkins. In 1967 and 1968 the club put together its first back-to-back winning seasons since 1945–1946, making fans hopeful for a spectacular 1969 season.

=== Fall of 1969 ===
In 1969, the Cubs started out 11–1, building a substantial lead in the newly created National League East. Chicago surged through the All-Star break, led by the quartet of eventual Hall of Famers in Banks, Jenkins, Santo, and Williams. Jenkins ultimately won 21 games, Bill Hands was also a 20-game winner, and Ken Holtzman won 17, which included a no-hitter on August 19. Chicago led the division by 8 1/2 games over St. Louis and by 9 1/2 games over the New York Mets in late August, but the Cubs wilted under pressure, losing key games to the Mets, and finished at 92–70, eight games out of first. Many superstitious fans attribute this collapse to an incident at Shea Stadium on September 9, when a fan released a black cat onto the field where it walked towards Santo, who was on deck, and the rest of the Cubs bench, thereby further cursing the club. Others have stated the sheer number of day games that the Cubs had to play contributed to the disaster. Chicago, being near Lake Michigan, boasts summers which are quite humid (85–90 °F (29–32 °C) on average), and playing in this heat day after day might have taken its toll. From August 14 through the end of the season, the Mets, who played mostly night games, had an amazing 38–11 record, finishing with 100 wins while the second place Cubs slumped in September, going only 8–17.

=== 1970–1981: Bad teams and the June Swoon ===
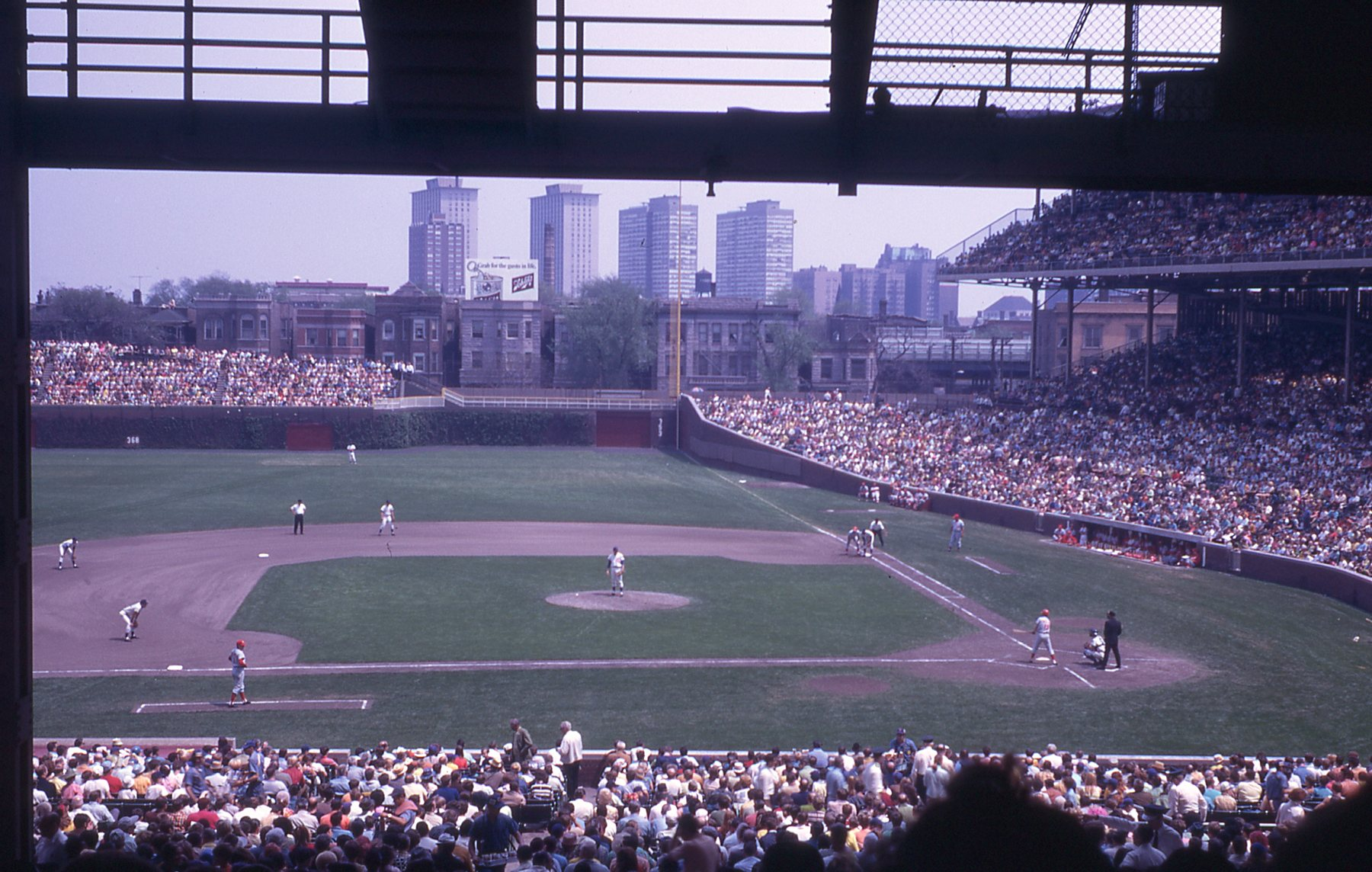
The Cubs play at Wrigley Field, May 1970.

In the decade of the 1970s and through the 1983 season, the Cubs tasted few substantial successes. Following the disastrous 1969 campaign, the Cubs fell into mediocrity, finishing slightly over .500 in 1970, 1971 and 1972, while they still had most of the core players from the 1969 team in uniform, including the "Old Guard" of Santo and Williams on the field and Jenkins, Holtzman, and Milt Pappas, who tossed a no-hitter in 1972, on the mound. (No Cub would again pitch a no-hitter until Carlos Zambrano on September 15, 2008.) After 1973, however, the bulk of those core players either retired or were traded, and the Cubs sank to the bottom of the National League East pecking order. Between 1973 and 1983 they were a combined 165 games under .500. It was during this entire decade of poor baseball that the term "Loveable Losers" became a catchphrase, since the fans were still coming out to see the team despite the dreadful quality of the on-field product.

Phil Wrigley died in 1977, leaving the team to his son, William Wrigley III. This year saw the Cubs' best finish in the 1970s, but even this was a testament to the team's futility during the "Dark Ages", as all star Bobby Murcer led the baby blue pinstriped '77 club into first place at 47–22 by June 28, and the team enjoyed an 8½ game lead in the N.L. East. After entering the all star break at 54–35, still an impressive 19 games above .500, the team started to crack as the Philadelphia Phillies picked up steam, cutting the Cubs division lead to only two games. As the summer progressed the Cubs spiraled out of contention, playing poorly in August and ending the season with a streak in which they lost 17 of 22 games, ultimately finishing at 81–81, a staggering 22 games behind Philadelphia.

Amazingly, the club then had similar, though not as exaggerated, falls in the two subsequent campaigns, despite the acquisition of slugger Dave Kingman. The Cubs were as many as 11 games over .500 in 1978 and peaked at 13 over in 1979, but still finished with losing records both seasons. This trait of contending well into the beginning of the summer and then falling in the standings became known as "The June Swoon". Along with Kingman, Cub rosters in this period featured such players as Rick Reuschel, who won 20 games in the infamous 1977 season, as well as Bill Madlock, Bill Buckner, Keith Moreland, José Cardenal, and Iván DeJesús.

== 1981–2008: Tribune Company era ==
=== 1984 and 1989 NL East Champs ===
William Wrigley's mother died within a few months of Phil Wrigley, saddling William with a massive estate tax bill. With most of his money tied up in either the Wrigley Company or the Cubs, William was forced to put the Cubs up for sale. In 1981, the Tribune Company purchased the Cubs from the Wrigley family for $20.5 million (equivalent to $72.6 million in 2025)—a handsome return on William Wrigley Jr.'s purchase of a stake in the team 65 years earlier—in the middle of another losing season. In 1982, DeJesus, one of the team's better players, was traded to the Philadelphia Phillies for shortstop Larry Bowa and infielder Ryne Sandberg.

In 1981, average home game attendance was 10,672. By 1983, thanks to the exposure of the Chicago Tribune and WGN, Rick Reuschel pitched in front of a crowd of 18,268, yet this was all about to change dramatically. In mid-1983, manager Lee Elia was fired after a profanity-laced tirade against Cub fans and was replaced by Charlie Fox on an interim basis. In the offseason, the Cubs rebuilt the starting pitching staff through a series of trades by general manager Dallas Green, who started by dealing for Bobby Dernier and Gary "The Sarge" Matthews and inking pitcher Scott Sanderson to complement what was already a good team, boasting players such as third baseman Ron Cey and catcher Jody Davis. Green also hired Jim Frey as their new manager.

==== 1984 NL East Champs ====
The Cubs opened up the 1984 season going 12–8 in April, tied for first place. The race stayed tight through the first half of the season, and Green continued to deal for arms. Bill Buckner was sent to the Boston Red Sox for Dennis Eckersley and Mike Brumley, and on June 13, Mel Hall and Joe Carter were sent to the Cleveland Indians for starter Rick Sutcliffe. With the rotation set, the northsiders found themselves 42–34 at the end of June, tied with the Phillies and 1.5 games ahead of the Mets. In a game versus St. Louis, Ryne Sandberg captured the attention of the nation with two game-tying home runs off former Cub Bruce Sutter, and eventually was named NL MVP. The second half of the 1984 season was all Cubbies, as the northsiders posted a 54–31 record, and the city of Chicago was in pandemonium.

The end result was a league-best 96 victories and the NL East Championship, as the team clinched the division in Pittsburgh. In what was the team's first post-season appearance since the 1945 pennant, Chicago met the San Diego Padres. The Cubs' 96 wins earned them home field advantage for the series. However, Wrigley Field did not yet have lights. ABC television, which broadcast the League Championship Series, pressured the National League to award San Diego a third home game to allow for an additional prime-time broadcast. In the first game of the NLCS the Cubs won 13–0 behind two Gary Matthews home runs, and then took a 2–0 series lead with a 4–2 win in Game 2. With the City of Chicago in an uproar, the series headed west for the final three games, where the Cubs needed only one win to make it to the World Series. After being soundly beaten in Game 3, they lost Game 4 when All-Star closer Lee Smith allowed a walk-off home run to Steve Garvey. Many fans remember Garvey rounding first after his game-winning shot, pumping his fist into the air, as one of the lowest moments in Cubdom. Game 5 was just as bad; the Cubs took a 3–0 lead to the 6th inning with Sutcliffe, the 1984 NL Cy Young Award winner, on the mound, but a critical error by first baseman Leon Durham helped the Padres win the clinching game. The current era of Wrigley Field being a "hip" place to be has its roots in the success of the 1984 club.

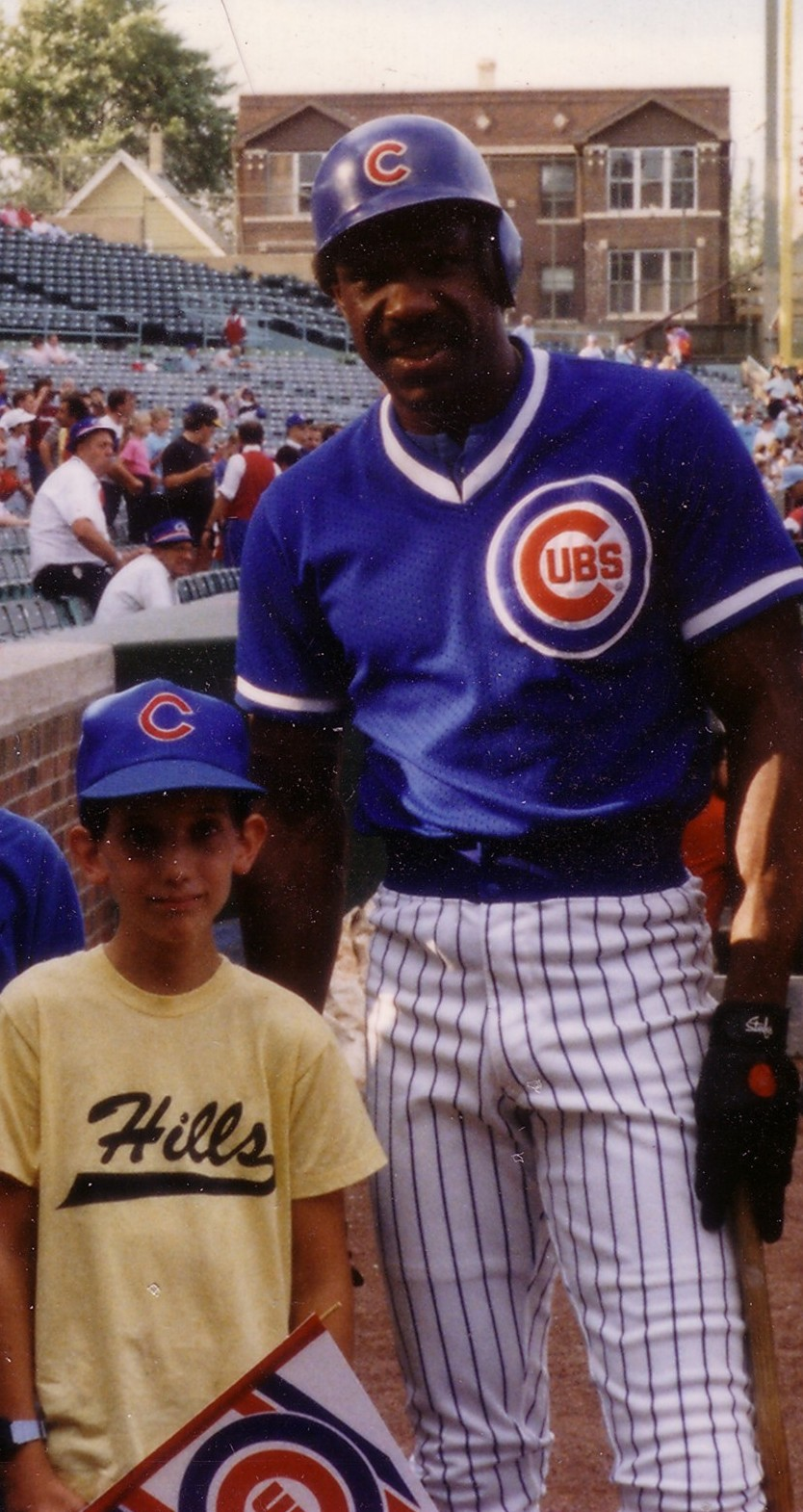
Andre Dawson meeting a young fan in 1988

Most publications picked the Cubs to repeat as Division Champs in 1985, especially after adding Dennis Eckersley to the rotation. The Cubs responded by starting out 35–19 by June 11, but swooned again, losing 13 in a row as the club's four top pitchers all hit the disabled list, and the Cardinals took the division crown as the North Siders ended up a disappointing 77–84. Shawon Dunston, the #1 overall pick in the 1982 draft came up from the minors for good near the end of the season.

During the 1986 season, Jim Frey was replaced at skipper with former Yankee Gene Michael, but the team went through two more years of poor baseball. Outfielder Andre Dawson was signed as a free agent prior to the 1987 season. Dallas Green was initially reluctant to sign Dawson, as they planned to start Brian Dayett in right, but Dawson proved his worth as he hit 49 round-trippers and took home NL MVP honors for a last place Cub team that season, the only player to accomplish that feat in the last 20 seasons.

President Reagan throws out the First Pitch at a Chicago Cubs Baseball Game on September 30, 1988.

The 1988 team, under new skipper Don Zimmer (who was promoted after Frey took the general manager position), was the first of a new era in Cub history, as lights were installed at Wrigley Field and were first to be used for a night game on August 8. The game was rained out in the early innings, and the first official night game was the next day, as the Cubs beat the Mets 6–4. The Mets, however, had a 100 win season, and the Cubs, still anchored by Sutcliffe, "Ryno" Sandberg, and "Hawk" Dawson, finished in a distant fourth place. This was despite having what at the time was a franchise record six All-Stars as Dawson, Dunston, and Sandberg were joined by Vance Law, Greg Maddux, and Rafael Palmeiro.

In 1989, the club made some noise as they won the NL East once again, finishing up a 93 win season with a six-game lead over the Mets. Some young faces contributed to the 1989 success, with 1B Mark Grace leading the team in hitting and fellow sophomore Damon Berryhill providing stability behind the plate for Maddux and the other Cub hurlers. Speedy outfielder Dwight Smith finished 2nd in the race for NL Rookie of the Year to fellow Cub outfielder Jerome Walton, who set the current club record hitting streak at 30 games. This time, Chicago met the San Francisco Giants in the NLCS. After splitting the first two games at home, the series headed to the Bay Area. The Cubs were heavy underdogs to the star-loaded Giants, who boasted players such as Matt Williams, Kevin Mitchell, and Will Clark. Despite an MVP caliber series from Grace, and although the team held a lead in each of the three games, they were unable to overcome bullpen letdowns and managerial blunders. This ultimately led to another early exit from the post season as the Giants eliminated the Cubs in five games (the NLCS had expanded from a best-of-five to a best-of-seven series in 1985). The Giants went on to lose to the Oakland A's in the famous "Earthquake Series".

=== 1990–2002: Ryno, Gracie, and Sammy ===
Between 1990 and 1997, a time-frame which coincided with the 6 championship dynasty of the NBA's Chicago Bulls, Cubs took a back seat in the headlines and also fell back into the doldrums of mediocrity. Most seasons in this period were basically over by the beginning of June. Despite their promise, Walton and Smith never regained the form they displayed as rookies in 1989. Rick Sutcliffe retired and Greg Maddux, who won his first Cy Young Award in a Cub uniform, left for Atlanta via free-agency, which greatly frustrated the fan base. Their replacements came and went as GM Larry Himes struggled to find a proper mix. Slugger George Bell was signed in 1991 and after a mediocre season was traded to the White Sox for Sammy Sosa. Pitchers Danny Jackson, Jaime Navarro, Randy Myers and Mike Morgan brought initial hope to the Friendly Confines faithful but ultimately spawned no playoff berths.

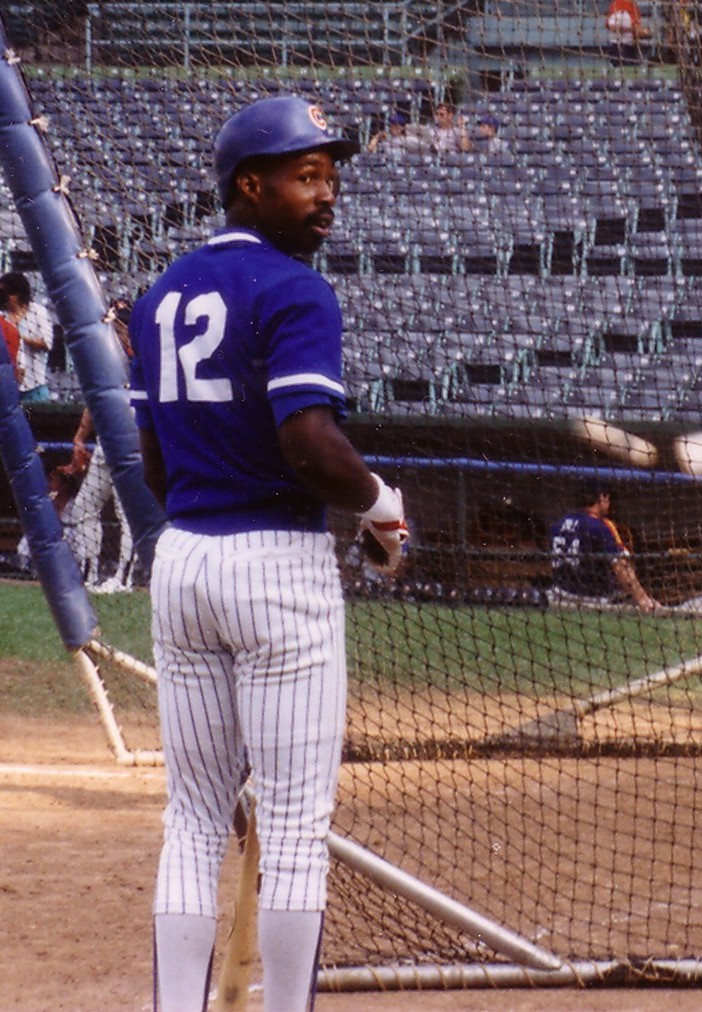
Shawon Dunston was a Cub for over a decade and inspired the Shawon-O-Meter, with which fans tracked his batting average.

Himes was fired and replaced with Ed Lynch in 1995, but the club's much beleaguered farm system was unable to help produce any help on the mound as minor league products such as Jim Bullinger, Kevin Foster, Mike Harkey, Jeff Pico, and Frank Castillo were unable to establish themselves in any significant fashion in the post-strike years. Steve Trachsel, a career journeyman, was the only pitcher the farm system produced during this period that had any longevity. Offensively, although much hyped prospects such as Gary Scott and Drew Hall eventually did not pan out, there was success. Mark Grace, known for his glove and his bat, along with rifle-armed shortstop Shawon Dunston and reliable catcher Joe Girardi became fan-favorites as Dawson and Sandberg solidified themselves as annual starters in the All-Star game with Ryno eventually becoming the highest paid player in baseball, retiring and then making a Jordanesque comeback.

Brian McRae, José Hernández and Glenallen Hill all found temporary homes in Chicago during the mid-1990s, (Hill is the only player to ever hit a home run to the rooftops across Waveland Ave) and Sammy Sosa started to establish himself as a power hitter, slugging 36 homers three times, but the teams themselves were quite poor. During the seven-year period following the 1989 season they had just two winning seasons, an 84–78 mark in 1993 and a 73–71 mark in the strike-shortened 1995 season. In 1997, the team signed lefty Terry Mulholland, but still hit rock bottom, losing their first 14 games to start the season and finishing in last place again with 94 losses. Near the end of the season Dunston was traded to Pittsburgh and Sandberg retired (this time for good) at season's end, so most figured 1998 would be another season of tempered expectations on the Windy City's north side.

The departure of many fan favorites, combined with what would be the sixth and final championship run of the Bulls as well as the death of popular WGN broadcaster Harry Caray just before the season dominated much of the media coverage, so the Cubs on-field expectations were uncharacteristically out of the headlines heading into the season. This changed with the signing of left fielder Henry Rodríguez to complement Grace and Sosa in the lineup and inking closer Rod Beck and starter Kevin Tapani to bolster the pitching staff. The team also acquired infielders Mickey "The Dandy Little Glove Man" Morandini and Jeff Blauser. With the season dedicated to Caray (whose grandson Chip Caray took over his duties alongside Steve Stone in the Cub's TV booth) the Cubs found themselves involved in an intense Wild Card race with the Giants and Mets. The Cubs became media-darlings once again, paced by Sosa's amazing 66 HR, MVP season and Kerry Wood's dominating Rookie of the Year pitching, which included an MLB record-tying 20 strikeout game versus the Houston Astros. On the last day of the season, the Cubs fell 4–3 to Houston after a throwing error by Mulholland, but the team's playoff hopes were saved when Colorado's Neifi Pérez hit a walk-off home run to beat San Francisco later that night, and the Giants and Cubs finished tied for the Wild Card. The teams met in a one-game playoff in Chicago, in which Gary Gaetti, claimed off waivers from St. Louis near the end of the season, hit a game-winning home run. Next up was Atlanta and Greg Maddux, but the North Siders played poorly, scoring only four runs as they were swept in three games.

Many credit the Sosa–McGwire home run chase with "saving baseball", by both bringing in new, younger fans and bringing back old fans soured by the 1994–95 Major League Baseball strike. After the season, GM Ed Lynch and manager Jim Riggleman unfortunately opted to keep many of the same players who had career years in 1998 for the 1999 season. Perhaps the most notable error was the club's failure to tender a contract offer to third baseman Robin Ventura, whose contract with the White Sox had expired and had expressed a desire to remain in Chicago. The Cubs, however, decided to give the position to Gaetti and Ventura signed with the Mets. Although the Cubs started well, at one point reaching nine games over .500, the June-swoon reappeared when they were swept by the crosstown rival White Sox in Comiskey Park, which was the genesis of another epic tailspin, resulting in the club finishing in last place. Jim Riggleman was fired after the disastrous 1999 campaign, his fifth season in Chicago, and a few months later team president Andy MacPhail cut ties with Lynch as well, taking the reins as general manager and making Jim Hendry assistant GM. MacPhail vowed to lead the team to success in the new century.

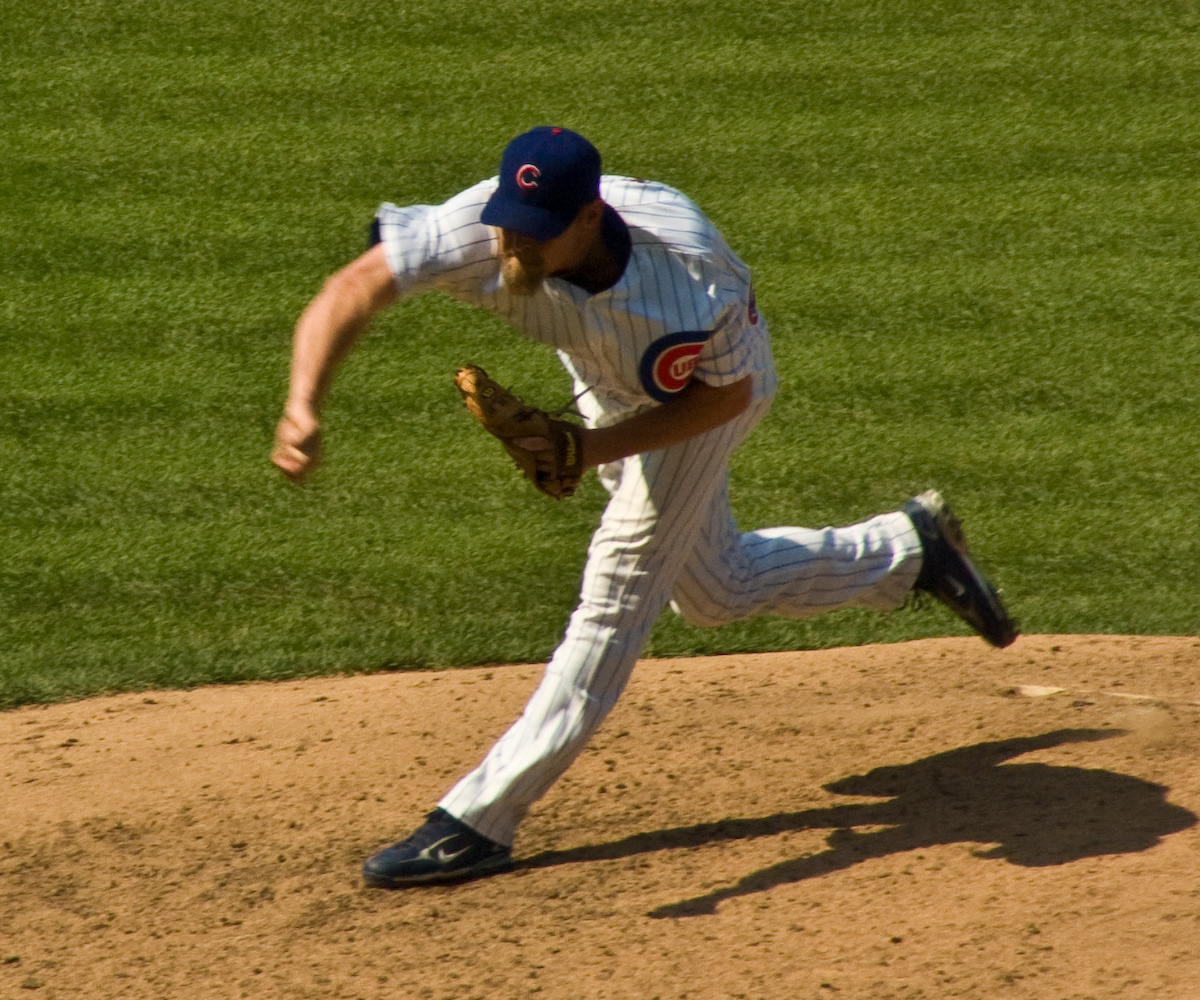
Kerry Wood owns a share of the MLB single-game strikeout record.

McPhail sent Hendry to work quickly, and his first move was trading reliever Terry Adams to Los Angeles for Eric Young and Ismael Valdez, and hiring Don Baylor to succeed Riggleman as the Chicago skipper. During a forgettable 2000 season, Hendry also sent pitcher Scott Downs to Montreal and acquired Rondell White. This laid the groundwork for the 2001 season, which saw the North Siders make another drive for the playoffs. They made a mid-June trade to acquire All-Star 1B Fred McGriff, though McGriff took over a month debating whether or not to approve the deal and leave his hometown Tampa Bay Devil Rays, ultimately waiving his no-trade clause and allow himself to be dealt to Chicago on July 27. "The Crime Dog" hit a respectable .282 with 12 homers in 49 games with the Cubs, hitting cleanup behind Sammy Sosa, who had perhaps his best season, hitting 64 homers with career highs in batting average (.328) and RBI (160) for Don Baylor's club. Jon Lieber had a 20 win season, and along with Tapani and Wood made up a solid rotation. The Cubs led the eventual Wild Card winning Cardinals by 2.5 games in early September, but Preston Wilson's walk-off homer off of closer Tom "Flash" Gordon took the wind out of the team's sails, failing to make another serious charge. The Cubs did manage to finish 88–74, only 5 games behind both St. Louis and Houston, who tied for first, but followed this up with a disastrous 2002 campaign, after which Baylor was fired and replaced by yet another new manager.

=== 2003–2006: The Dusty Baker years ===
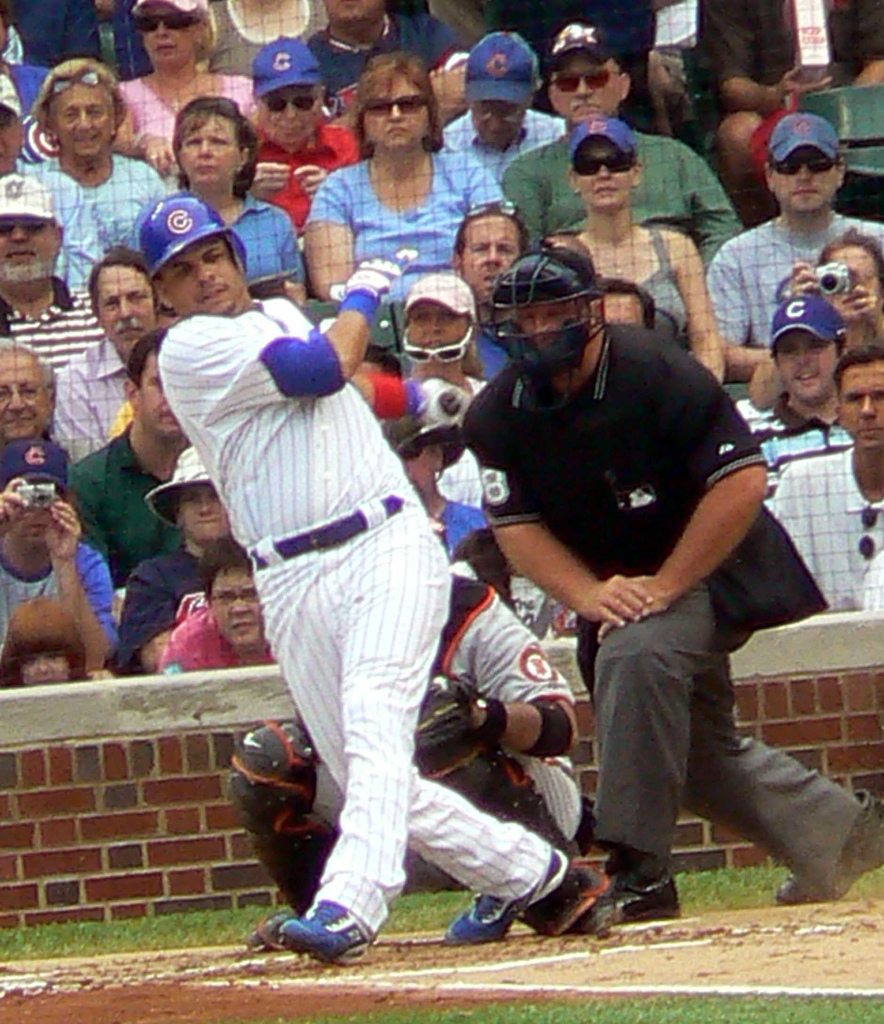
3B Aramis Ramírez was acquired in 2003 in a lopsided deal with the Pittsburgh Pirates.

The Cubs won their first NL Central crown in 2003. The team's success can be attributed mostly to its dominant starting rotation, which featured Mark Prior, Kerry Wood, Carlos Zambrano, and Matt Clement, all of whom won at least 13 games. The pitching staff as a whole led the National League in strikeouts with 1,404. At mid-season, the Cubs had overcome Sammy Sosa's corked bat incident, and found themselves in the thick of the pennant race, and were looking for a replacement for Bill Mueller, who was traded near the end of the 2002 campaign. Initially, there was talk of a deal for Marlins third baseman Mike Lowell, which came very close to fruition. Eventually, the team hit paydirt after trading Mark Bellhorn for Jose Hernandez and then trading Hernandez and Bobby Hill to the Pirates for Aramis Ramírez and center fielder Kenny Lofton in what has proven to be a lopsided deal in the Cubbies favor.

Finishing up August at 69–66, the Cubs went on a tear in September, riding Sammy Sosa, Moisés Alou, and their new teammates as they started the month by taking four of five games in a crucial series against the St. Louis Cardinals, and winning 19 out of 27 by months end. Prior and Wood both had good seasons, but were especially dominant after June, and were dubbed "Chicago Heat" by Sports Illustrated, a name that stuck on with the media. The two fireballers and their mates managed to beat out the charging Houston Astros, clinching the division on September 27 against Pittsburgh, just as they had in 1984. The team charged into the playoffs, knocking off Greg Maddux and the Atlanta Braves in 5 games in the NLDS, the club's first post-season series win since 1908, and moved on to face Lowell and the eventual 2003 World Series champion Florida Marlins in the NLCS. After dropping game one, the Cubs proceeded to take a 3 games to 1 lead and it appeared the Cubs would reach the World Series at last. Marlins pitcher Josh Beckett shut out the Cubs in Game 5, but most fans thought this a blessing, as with pocket aces Prior and Wood slated to start the next two games, victory seemed all but assured, and the team could "break the curse" at home.

Game 6, held on October 14, was a scene unlike anything seen before, as some estimated 200,000 screaming fans battled the chilly weather and packed the streets outside Wrigley Field, and thousands more packed into local bars around the park, in anticipation of witnessing a Cubs World Series berth. The Cubs gave Prior a 3–0 lead that night. The crowd pumped up with even more adrenaline when the 7th inning stretch was sung by comedian Bernie Mac, who instead of replacing "home team" with "Cubbies", sang "Root, root, root for The Champs". It was the eighth inning when the now-infamous incident took place in which a fan, Steve Bartman, attempted to catch a foul ball hit by Florida's Luis Castillo that Cubs left fielder Moisés Alou was also attempting to catch to record the second out. Alou was enraged and Castillo eventually drew a walk. The play was followed up with a booted ground ball by shortstop Alex S. Gonzalez, which potentially could have ended the inning via a double play. This apparently rattled the team and opened the door to 8 Florida runs and a Marlins victory. Ironically, Gonzalez led the National League in fielding percentage among all shortstops for the regular season. The next night, the Cubs rebounded to gain a lead twice in Game 7, with Kerry Wood (who homered in the game) on the mound, but lost a close, back and forth game, sealed by a game winning shot by Marlins slugger Derrek Lee, and the Cubs were once again left on the outside of the World Series looking in.

In 2004, misfortune struck the North Side again. The team welcomed back prodigal son Greg Maddux to fill the fourth spot in the rotation behind Wood, Prior, and Carlos Zambrano, giving the Cubs what on paper was considered to be the strongest rotation in the league. In late July, general manager Jim Hendry pulled a blockbuster trade with the eventual 2004 World Series champion Boston Red Sox for Nomar Garciaparra, and the Cubs held the Wild Card lead by a game and a half on September 24, but suffered a late inning comeback from the New York Mets, and then proceeded to drop 7 of their last 9 games, five of them by one run, relinquishing the lead to the Houston Astros. The season finale was a meaningless victory over the Atlanta Braves, a game which team captain Sosa requested to sit out, but was then videotaped by security cameras as he left the ballpark in the second inning. When asked about the event by the media, Sosa denied leaving Wrigley Field early. Already a controversial figure in the clubhouse, Sosa alienated much of his fan base (and the few team members who still were on good terms with him) with this incident, leaving his place in Cubs' lore possibly tarnished for years to come.

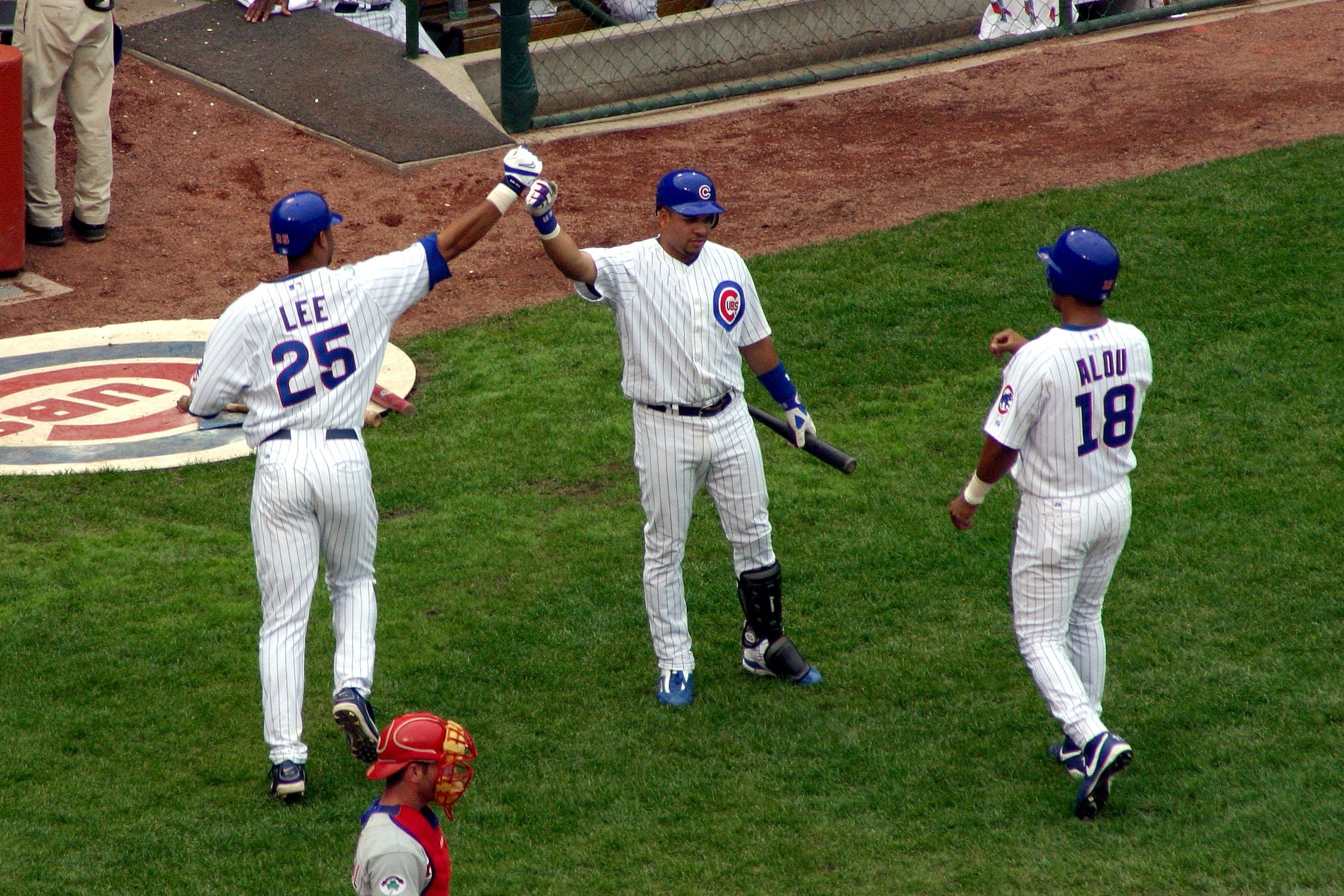
Derrek Lee, Moisés Alou and Ramírez led the Chicago Cubs offense in 2005.

Though Dusty Baker had led the team to 89 wins in 2004, a one-game improvement over 2003's near-pennant season, the expectations were loftier and the season was deemed a failure. This time, the fallout was decidedly unlovable. Questions were raised as to Baker's ability to handle the pitching staff, his constant juggling of the Cubs lineup, and the vast number of costly injuries. Prior to the 2005 campaign, the Cubs finally managed to trade Sosa to the Baltimore Orioles for Jerry Hairston Jr. and Mike Fontenot. Months later, Sammy was one of a group of players (including Mark McGwire) who were asked to testify during an all-day, nationally televised hearing before the House Government Reform Committee about steroid use in baseball.

Hendry pulled yet another shrewd move in the offseason, acquiring 2003 villain Derrek Lee for Hee-seop Choi, and Lee went on to have his best season, hitting .335 with 46 home runs and 107 RBIs. Ryan Dempster also had a good season, establishing himself as the team's closer with 33 saves in 35 save opportunities, but the team finished a disappointing fourth place at 79–83. Many key players that were expected to contribute to the team's success missed extended time due to injury, including Ramirez, Prior, Wood, and Garciaparra. Though many felt Baker had done a great job leading the team to what was nearly a .500 season, most of the media and fan base started to call for Baker's head due to what they saw as nonchalance and a failure to hold his players accountable. The crosstown rival Chicago White Sox's victory in the 2005 World Series over the Cubs' then-divisional rival Houston Astros that year only rubbed salt in the Cubs fans' wounds.

The Tribune gave Baker one last chance to turn things around, and Jim Hendry retooled the lineup for the 2006 campaign. During the off-season, the Cubs revamped the outfield, acquiring speedy center fielder Juan Pierre from the Marlins and inked free agent Jacque Jones to fill the hole in right. Former blue-chip prospect Corey Patterson, who had shown flashes of brilliance but never the ability to play consistently at a high level, was traded. Additionally, veteran relief pitchers Bob Howry and Scott Eyre were brought in to shore up the bullpen. The North Siders came out of the gate hot in 2006, sweeping the St. Louis Cardinals en route to a 14–9 start, but an injury to superstar Derrek Lee sent the team into another tailspin. In early May, the team set a franchise record for offensive futility by scoring only 13 runs in 11 games. Rich Hill came up from Iowa and showed some flashes of brilliance, and Aramis Ramírez had another great season, but Pierre, though stealing 52 bases, failed to live up to expectations and Jones lashed out at the Wrigley faithful for booing him after his initial poor play. Though Jones righted his ship by slugging 27 homers, the team was repeatedly unable to score runs for its pitching staff and finished the season at a pathetic 66–96. As rumors of the club's sale dominated the horizon, Andy MacPhail resigned his position as team president following the season, and the team opted to let Baker, the former "Messiah's" contract expire.

=== 2007–2008: Back to back ===
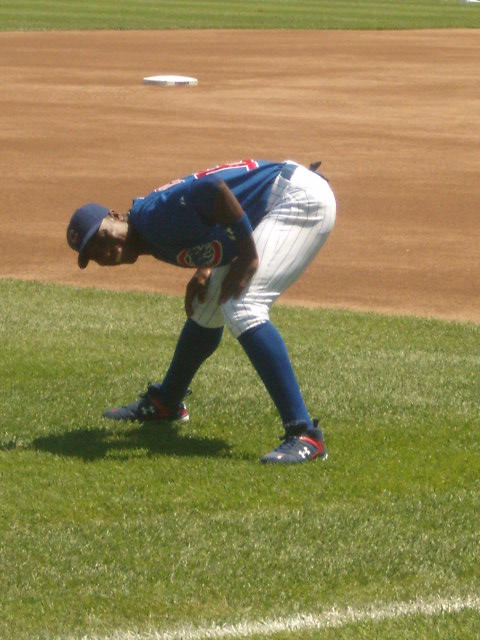
Alfonso Soriano, who signed the richest deal in franchise history in 2007, toys with fans at the Friendly Confines.

After finishing the 2006 campaign in the NL Central cellar, the Boys in Blue went from worst to first in 2007. First, Chicago hired veteran skipper Lou Piniella after a managerial search that included hometown favorite Joe Girardi. Soon afterward, the Tribune Company was sold, but still allowed several important pre-season moves. The team re-signed Aramis Ramírez, and instead of waiting for Mark Prior to heal, Hendry signed Ted Lilly and Jason Marquis to join the rotation. He also inked free agent infielder Mark DeRosa and gave Alfonso Soriano the richest contract in Cubs' history. The team started slowly, however, falling behind Milwaukee by as many as eight games. Zambrano and catcher Michael Barrett were involved in a dugout brawl, Piniella was suspended for kicking dirt at an umpire, and the season was in jeopardy by June.

Then things started to change. Barrett was traded away, and the club survived injuries and suspensions, sparked by the play of rookie reliever Carlos Mármol, and infielder Ryan Theriot. The Cubs won 19 games in July, and toward the end of the season staff ace Kerry Wood returned from the disabled list as a reliever. In September, the Northsiders won critical series, kicking off a 10–2 stretch that featured a pair of dramatic, late-inning wins against the Reds. In what some called the most exciting Major League Baseball season ever, the Cubs clinched the Central on September 28.

In the NLDS, they met the Arizona Diamondbacks. Carlos Zambrano was dominant in Game 1, but was matched by D-Backs ace Brandon Webb as the game was tied at one after six. In a move that has since come under scrutiny, Piniella called in ace reliever Carlos Mármol to start the seventh, who uncharacteristically gave up two runs. Piniella pulled Zambrano because he was planning on bringing him back on short rest for Game 4. The next night, the Cubs jumped out 2–0 on a home run by rookie catcher Geovany Soto, but Lilly, who was 9–1 following Cub losses, was touched for six runs. In the finale at home, the offense again squandered numerous opportunities, stranding 12 runners and falling victim to four double plays en route to another abrupt end to a once promising season.

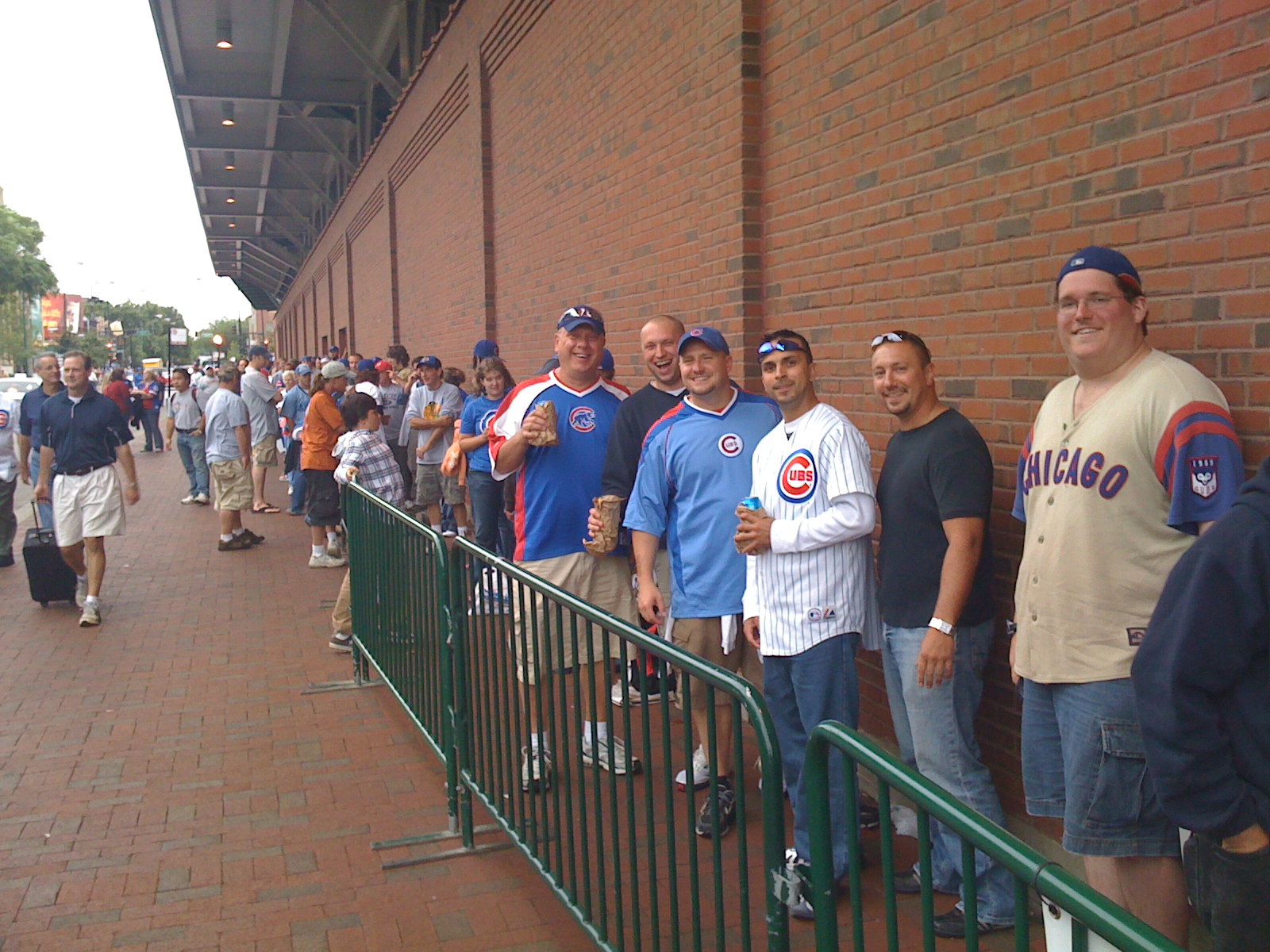
Lines can become very long outside Gate N, the entrance to the Bud Light Bleachers. Lines often start forming as early as 9 a.m. for a 1:20 p.m. first pitch.

Just before Christmas in 2007, Sam Zell closed the sale of the Chicago Tribune and promised the team would be sold prior to the season (which ultimately didn't happen), leading many to question whether the Cubs would be major players in the free-agent market. Those questions were answered when they inked the much-pursued Japanese superstar Kosuke Fukudome of the Chunichi Dragons. Rumors of a 9-player deal with Baltimore for Brian Roberts fizzled after trade talks that had dragged on from January until after Opening Day. Kerry Wood entered the season as closer and Ryan Dempster returned to the rotation.

The Cubbies started out hot, taking an early division lead, while recording the 10,000th franchise win in April. Reed Johnson and later Jim Edmonds were signed to platoon in center after sending prospect Félix Pie back to AAA Iowa. One highnote of the season came on May 30, after the Boys in Blue fell behind the Rockies 9–1, they ultimately surged back, winning 10–9 and by mid-June Chicago boasted their best record in baseball. Chicago set a team record with eight players being named as all stars with Zambrano, Soriano, Ramirez, Wood and Dempster being joined by first timers Fukudome, Geovany Soto, and late addition Carlos Mármol. On July 8, Sean Gallagher, who had replaced a struggling Rich Hill as the club's fifth starter, was dealt to Oakland along with outfielders Matt Murton and Eric Patterson, as the Cubs netted star pitcher Rich Harden, and Chicago entered the break with an NL best 57 wins and a 4.5 game division lead.

The club overcame a seven-game losing streak to open September, and Carlos Zambrano pitched the clubs first no-hitter in three decades on September 14, against Houston in Milwaukee. That game was moved to Miller Park after Hurricane Ike forced the series to be moved from Minute Maid Park to the domed field in Wisconsin. The Cubs clinched their second straight N.L. Central crown on September 20 at home against rival St. Louis, clinching home field advantage. Unfortunately, the heavily favored Cubs were swept by the Los Angeles Dodgers, leaving a sour taste in the mouths of Cub Nation, as a potential "Dream Season" came to an abrupt end.

== 2009–present: The Ricketts family era ==
=== New ownership ===
In July 2008, Dallas Mavericks owner and businessman Mark Cuban, bid $1.35 billion (equivalent to $2.02 billion in 2025) to purchase the Cubs and Wrigley Field from Tribune Company, the largest of three final bids. The next highest bids were in the $1.1 billion range (equivalent to $1.64 billion in 2025) and were submitted by the Ricketts family and a group led by former Republican Vice-presidential candidate Jack Kemp and Hall of Famer Hank Aaron. MLB Commissioner Bud Selig supported a fourth potential buyer, John Canning.

Zell's Tribune Company filed for bankruptcy on December 8, 2008. This filing however did not alter the Cubs' for-sale situation. In December 2008, the club announced that it expected a sale to culminate before spring training, and on January 22, 2009, Cubs.com announced that the group led by the Ricketts had their bid accepted by Zell.

Apparently handcuffed by Tribune's bankruptcy and the sale of the club to the Ricketts family, the Cubs quest for a NL Central 3-peat started with notice that there would be less money invested into contracts than in previous years. Once again, trade speculation dominated the headlines at the winter meetings, this time surrounding Padres' ace Jake Peavy, which, much like the Brian Roberts talks a year earlier, resulted in nothing. Piniella blamed the 2008 post season failure on the lack of left-handed hitters, and a bevy of high caliber outfielders fit the bill. Ultimately, the club settled on inking oft-troubled switch hitter Milton Bradley over Adam Dunn, Raúl Ibañez, and Bobby Abreu. The bench and bullpen were overhauled in a bevy of money saving moves, and fan favorites Kerry Wood and Mark DeRosa both left for the Cleveland Indians. Kevin Gregg was acquired from the Marlins to replace Wood, and Mike Fontenot was promoted to replace DeRosa.

Led by the strong play of Derrek Lee, Ted Lilly and rookie pitcher Randy Wells, the club played well early in the season, but fell on hard times as injuries began to take their toll. Nearly every key player either struggled or suffered injury and the Northsiders went into the All Star break with a disappointing .500 record. Carlos Mármol replaced Gregg as closer and the team stayed in the race, but they were distracted by Bradley, whose poor hitting and even poorer attitude became a major issue as the season progressed. Bradley complained about being heckled, booed and "hated" by bleacher fans and expressed his overall unhappiness in Chicago, eventually leading to a season ending suspension. Despite this, the Boys in Blue engaged St. Louis in a see-saw battle for first place thru July, but the Cardinals played to a torrid 20–6 pace in August, designating their rivals to battle in a five-team Wild Card race, from which they were eliminated in the season's final week. On the bright side, the Cubs finished the season with their third straight winning record (83–78) for the first time since 1967–1972, and looked forward to a new era of ownership under the Ricketts' family.

Rich Harden, who spent a large amount of his tenure with the Cubs injured, signed with Texas and Bradley was traded for Carlos Silva before the 2010 season. Silva and Bradley's replacement, Marlon Byrd, were initially nice surprises for what was largely a forgettable season. Silva started out 8–0 and he and Byrd were both named to the NL All-Star team, and young prospect Starlin Castro made his major league debut, hitting a three-run home run in his first major league at-bat. However, as the team fell out of contention Derek Lee, Ryan Theriot, and Ted Lilly were traded away and skipper Lou Piniella retired near the end of the season, in which the Cubs finished in 5th place at 75–87. Mike Quade was named interim manager and the Cubs finished the season nicely, at 25–13, which earned Quade the nod as manager for 2011. However, the 2011 club finished 20 games under .500, despite the acquisitions of slugger Carlos Peña and pitcher Matt Garza.

=== Under new management and the 2016 World Series Champions ===
Weeks after the season 2011 season came to an end, hope returned to the club in the form of a new club philosophy as owner Tom Ricketts fired GM Jim Hendry and signed Theo Epstein away from the Boston Red Sox, naming him club president and giving him a five-year contract worth over $18 million. Epstein, a proponent of sabremetrics and one of the architects of the 2004 and 2007 World Series championships in Boston, brought along Jed Hoyer to fill the role of GM and hired Dale Sveum as manager. Although the team had a dismal 2012 season, losing 101 games (the worst record since 1966) it was largely expected. The record included a 13-game losing streak in mid-May, the team's longest in 15 years. The youth movement ushered in by Epstein and Hoyer began as longtime fan favorite Kerry Wood retired, followed by Ryan Dempster and Geovany Soto being traded to Texas at the All-Star break. The development of Castro, Anthony Rizzo, Darwin Barney, Brett Jackson and pitcher Jeff Samardzija as well as the replenishing of the minor-league system became the primary focus of the season, a philosophy which the new management said would carry over at least through the 2013 season. Manager Dale Sveum was fired on September 30, 2013. On November 7, 2013, Rick Renteria was hired as the manager.

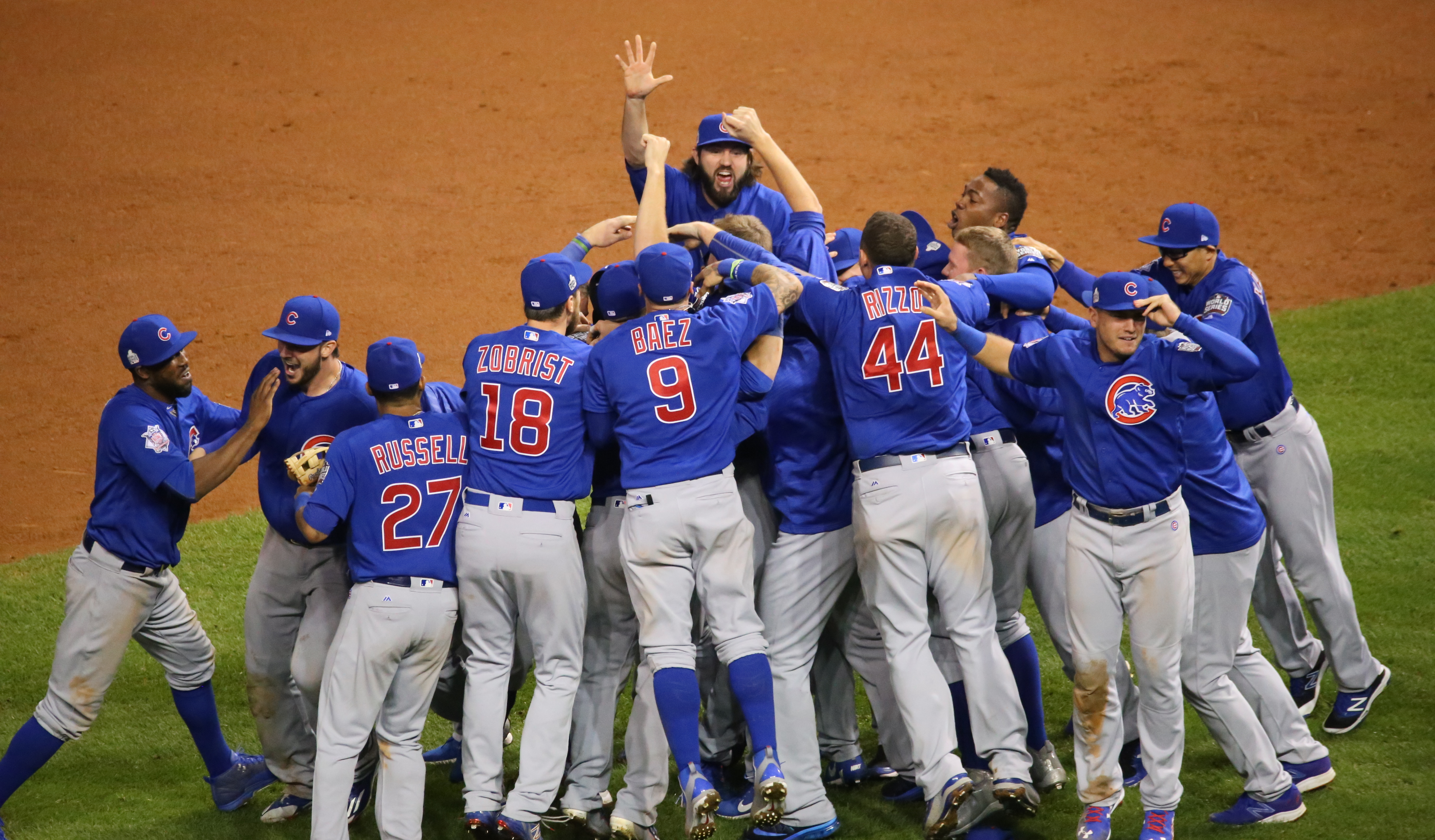
The Cubs celebrate the team's first World Series win in 108 years.

After losing records in 2013 and 2014, and after firing Rick Renteria and after Joe Maddon opted out of his contract with the Tampa Bay Rays and was hired by Epstein late in 2014, the Cubs secured a playoff berth in 2015 with the third-best record in MLB. They defeated the Pittsburgh Pirates in the National League Wild Card Game and the St. Louis Cardinals in the National League Division Series en route to the 2015 National League Championship Series, where they were eliminated by the New York Mets. The club entered the 2016 season looking to advance deep into the playoffs again. This time, however, the Cubs won the NL Central with the best record in MLB, 103–58. It was the club's first divisional title since 2008. The team's fortunes in the playoffs turned around as well. They defeated the San Francisco Giants in the National League Division Series and the Los Angeles Dodgers in the National League Championship series, breaking the Curse of the Billy Goat, and securing the franchise's first National League pennant and World Series appearance since 1945. Once there, the Cubs fell to a 3–1 series deficit versus the Cleveland Indians, but rallied to win Game 5 in Chicago and Game 6 in Cleveland -- forcing a winner-take-all Game 7 at Progressive Field. On November 2, 2016, after ten innings, a rain delay, and a blown 5–1 lead, the Cubs finally emerged victorious in Game 7, 8–7. The Cubs' historic win marked the end of the longest championship drought in American professional sports history, winning the franchise's third World Series trophy and first in 108 years.

=== 2017–present: Post-Championship years ===
After winning their first championship in 108 years, the Cubs were trying to become the first team to repeat as World Series champions since the 1998–2000 Yankees. They struggled all of the first half of the 2017 season, finishing two games under .500 before the All-Star break. The Cubs bounced back in the second half to finish 22 games over .500 and win the NL Central by six games over the Milwaukee Brewers. In the NLDS, the Cubs beat the Nationals in five games, advancing to their third straight NLCS. In the NLCS they faced the Dodgers for the second time in a row, and this time, the Dodgers eliminated the Cubs in five games to end the Cubs' quest to repeat.

During the offseason, the Cubs made several free agent signings to improve their pitching rotation and bullpen. They signed starting pitcher Yu Darvish, closer Brandon Morrow, and also Tyler Chatwood and Steve Cishek. The Cubs could not stay healthy during the season, Anthony Rizzo was out for most of April, Kris Bryant was injured multiple times the whole season. Yu Darvish only started eight games due to injuries. Morrow was also injured during the season and did not play at all in September. The Cubs still managed to stay in first place in the division throughout the season. Due to all the injuries for the Cubs, the Brewers managed to tie the Cubs with the same record to finish the season. The Brewers defeated the Cubs in a tie-breaker game to win the Central Division and to have the top seed in the National League playoffs. The Cubs then played in the Wild Card game versus the Colorado Rockies, the Cubs lost, it was the Cubs' earliest playoff exit in three years.

At the All-Star Break on July 9, 2019, the Cubs were leading the NL Central by a half-game over the Milwaukee Brewers. On September 25, 2019, an eighth consecutive loss eliminated the Cubs from any possibility of playing in the 2019 playoffs.

On October 24, 2019, the Cubs hired David Ross as their new manager. The 2020 season was shortened to 60 games due to the COVID-19 pandemic. The Cubs finished first in the NL Central with a 34–26 record but were swept by the Miami Marlins in the Wild Card round.

In 2021, the Cubs finished fourth in the National League Central with a 71–91 record after trading away some of the core players from their 2016 World Series run, including Bryant, Rizzo, and Baez. In 2022, they finished third with a 74–88 record.

In 2023, the Cubs finished second place in the National League Central with an 83–79 record. On November 6, the Cubs fired Ross, who was entering the final year of his contract, and hired Craig Counsell as their new manager. In 2024, Counsell's first year at the helm, the Cubs duplicated their 2023 record of 83–79, finishing in a tie with the St. Louis Cardinals for second place in the National League Central.

== Retired numbers ==
The Chicago Cubs retired numbers are commemorated on pinstriped flags flying from the foul poles at Wrigley Field, with the exception of Jackie Robinson, the Brooklyn Dodgers player whose number was retired for all clubs:

Ron
Santo
3B
Retired
September 28, 2003
Ernie
Banks
SS, 1B
Retired
August 22, 1982
Ryne
Sandberg
2B
Retired
August 28, 2005
Billy
Williams
LF
Retired
August 13, 1987
Ferguson
Jenkins
P
Retired
May 3, 2009
Greg
Maddux
P
Retired
May 3, 2009
Jackie
Robinson*
2B
Honored April 15, 1997

There is a movement to retire the uniform shirt of Gabby Hartnett. The Cubs first wore numbers on their shirts in 1932, and Hartnett wore three different numbers. Number 7 was initially assigned to Hartnett, but he was switched to #9 the next year. In 1937 he was switched to number 2, which he retained through his last season with the Cubs, 1940. There are also more recent movements to retire number 34 for Kerry Wood, number 21 for Sammy Sosa, and number 17 for Mark Grace.

== Events and records ==
=== Merkle's Boner ===
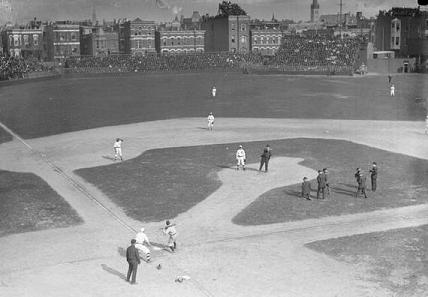
West Side Grounds served as the club's home for nearly 30 years.

On September 23, 1908, the Cubs and New York Giants were involved in a tight pennant race. The two clubs were tied in the bottom of the ninth inning at the Polo Grounds, and N.Y. had runners on first and third and two outs when Al Bridwell singled, scoring Moose McCormick from third with the Giants' apparent winning run, but the runner on first base, rookie Fred Merkle, left the field without touching second base. As fans swarmed the field, Cub infielder Johnny Evers retrieved the ball and touched second. Since there were two outs, a forceout was called at second base, ending the inning and the game. Because of the tie the Giants and Cubs ended up tied for first place. The Giants lost the ensuing one-game playoff and the Cubs went on to the World Series.

=== Babe Ruth's called shot ===
On October 1, 1932, in game three of the World Series between the Cubs and the New York Yankees, Babe Ruth allegedly stepped to the plate, pointed his finger to Wrigley Field's center field bleachers and hit a long home run to center. There is speculation as to whether the "facts" surrounding the story are true or not, but nevertheless Ruth did help the Yankees secure a World Series win that year and the home run accounted for his 15th and last home run in the post season before he retired in 1935.

=== Riot at Wrigley ===
Slugger Hack Wilson had a combative streak and frequently initiated fights with opposing players and fans. On June 22, 1928, a riot broke out in the ninth inning at Wrigley Field against the St. Louis Cardinals when Wilson jumped into the box seats to attack a heckling fan. An estimated 5,000 spectators swarmed the field before police could separate the combatants and restore order. The fan sued Wilson for $20,000 (equivalent to $375,000 in 2025), but a jury ruled in Wilson's favor.

=== RBI record ===
Hack Wilson set a record of 56 home-runs and 190 runs-batted-in in 1930, breaking Lou Gehrig's MLB record of 176 RBI. (In 1999, a long-lost extra RBI mistakenly credited to Charlie Grimm had been found by Cooperstown researcher Cliff Kachline and verified by historian Jerome Holtzman, increasing the record number to 191.) As of 2014 the record still stands, with no serious threats coming since Gehrig (184) and Hank Greenberg (183) in the same era. The closest anyone has come to the mark in the last 75 years was Manny Ramirez's 165 RBI in 1999. In addition to the RBI record, Wilson 56 home-runs stood as the National League record until 1998, when Sammy Sosa and Mark McGwire hit 66 and 70, respectively. Wilson was named "Most Useful" player that year by the Baseball Writers' Association of America, as the official N.L. Most Valuable Player Award was not awarded until the next season.

=== The Homer in the Gloamin' ===
On September 28, 1938, with the Cubs and Pirates tied at 5, Gabby Hartnett stepped to the plate in a lightless Wrigley Field that was gradually being overcome by darkness and visibility was becoming difficult. With two outs in the bottom of the ninth and the umpires ready to end the game, Hartnett launched Pirate hurler Mace Brown's offering into the gloom and haze. This would be remembered as his "Homer in the Gloamin". It was ranked by ESPN as the 47th greatest home run of all time.

=== Rick Monday and the U.S. flag ===
On April 25, 1976, at Dodger Stadium, father-and-son protestors ran into the outfield and tried to set fire to a U.S. flag. When Cubs outfielder Rick Monday noticed the flag on the ground and the man and boy fumbling with matches and lighter fluid, he dashed over and snatched the flag to thunderous applause. When he came up to bat in the next half-inning, he got a standing ovation from the crowd and the stadium titantron flashed the message, "RICK MONDAY... YOU MADE A GREAT PLAY..." Monday later said, "If you're going to burn the flag, don't do it around me. I've been to too many veterans' hospitals and seen too many broken bodies of guys who tried to protect it."

=== The Sandberg game ===
On June 23, 1984, Chicago trailed St. Louis 9–8 in the bottom of the ninth on NBC's Game of the Week when Ryne Sandberg, known mostly for his glove, slugged a game-tying home run off ace closer Bruce Sutter. Despite this, the Cardinals scored two runs in the top of the tenth. Sandberg came up again facing Sutter with one man on base, and hit yet another game tying home run, and Ryno became a household name. The Cubs won what has become known as "The Sandberg Game" in the 11th inning.

=== First night game at Wrigley Field ===
On August 8, 1988, the Cubs hosted their first night game ever at Wrigley Field. For over 74 seasons at Wrigley Field, the Cubs had never played a night game at Wrigley field until this day in history. Wrigley Field was the last Major League Baseball park to install lights in the ballpark. The Cubs played the Philadelphia Phillies for their first night game at Wrigley Field. Lifelong fan Harry Grossman was selected to turn on the lights of the ballpark. After a count of three, Grossman flipped the switch and turned on the newly installed lights in Wrigley Field for the first time in history. He announced shortly after flipping the switch, "Let there be light".

=== Most home-runs in a month ===
In June, 1998 Sammy Sosa exploded into the pursuit of Roger Maris' home run record. Sosa had 13 home runs entering the month, representing less than half of Mark McGwire's total. Sosa had his first of four multi-home run games that month on June 1, and went on to break Rudy York's record with 20 home runs in the month, a record that still stands. By the end of his historic month, the outfielder's 33 home runs tied him with Ken Griffey Jr. and left him only four behind McGwire's 37. Sosa finished with 66 and won the NL MVP Award.

=== The Steve Bartman incident ===
On October 14, 2003, the Cubs were leading 3-0 in the eighth inning in game 6 of the National League Championship Series against the Miami Marlins. Marlins player Luis Castillo (second baseman) hit a foul ball towards the left field wall, right at Steve Bartman. Moisès Alou attempted to make the catch but couldn't come up with it due to the interference of Bartman and several other fans. Shortly after this incident occurred, the Miami Marlins went on to score 8 runs in the eighth inning and subsequently ended up winning the game and remainder of the series. Bartman was berated from fellow Cubs fans as a result of trying to catch the foul ball. Bartman had to be escorted out of the stadium by the police due to Cubs fans throwing food and beverages at him. Former Illinois governor Rod Blagojevich suggested for Bartman to join a Witness protection program due to the amount of hate he was receiving. In an attempt to get out of the spotlight Bartman issued a public apology. A documentary produced by ESPN named Catching Hell was premiered on September 26, 2011 highlighting the incident that occurred.

=== 10,000th win ===
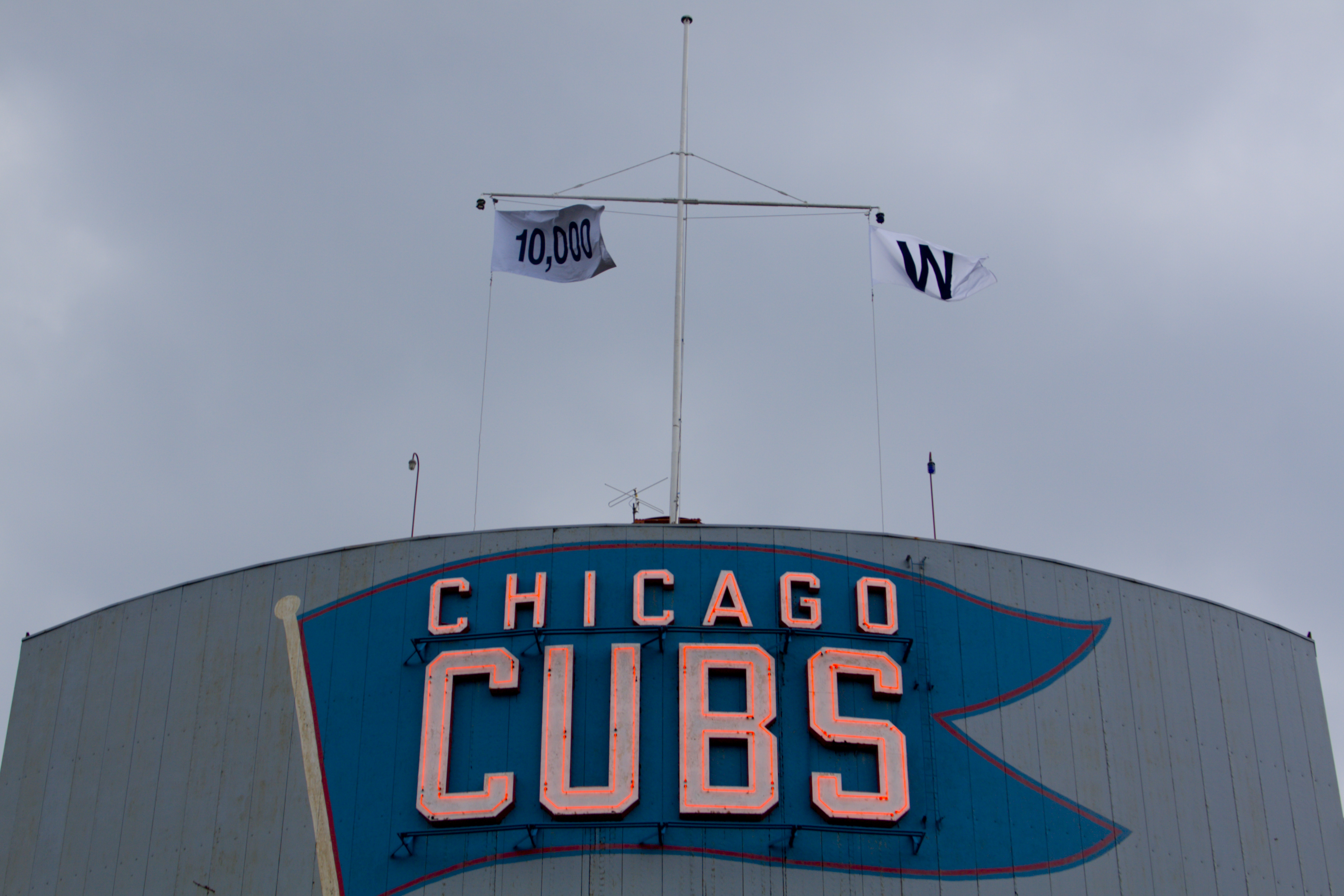
Flag commemorating 10,000 wins

On April 23, 2008, against the Colorado Rockies, the Cubs recorded the 10,000th regular-season win in their franchise's history dating back to the beginning of the National League in 1876. The Cubs reached the milestone with an overall National League record of 10,000–9,465. Chicago was only the second club in Major League Baseball history to attain this milestone, the first having been the San Francisco Giants in mid-season 2005. The Cubs, however, hold the mark for victories for a team in a single city. The Chicago club's 77–77 record in the National Association (1871, 1874–1875) is not included in MLB record keeping. Post-season series are also not included in the totals. To honor the milestone, the Cubs flew an extra white flag displaying "10,000" in blue, along with the customary "W" flag.

=== Tape-measure home runs ===
On May 11, 2000, Glenallen Hill, facing Brewers starter Steve Woodard, became the first, and thus far only player, to hit a pitched ball onto the roof of a five-story residential building across Waveland Ave, beyond Wrigley Field's left field wall. The shot was estimated at well over 500 feet (150 m), but the Cubs fell to Milwaukee 12–8. No batted ball has ever hit the center field scoreboard, although the original "Slammin' Sammy", golfer Sam Snead, hit it with a golf ball in an exhibition in the 1950s. In 1948, Bill Nicholson barely missed the scoreboard when he launched a home run ball onto Sheffield Avenue and in 1959, Roberto Clemente came even closer with a home run ball hit onto Waveland Avenue. In 2001, a Sammy Sosa shot landed across Waveland and bounced a block down Kenmore Avenue. Dave Kingman hit a shot in 1979 that hit the third porch roof on the east side of Kenmore, estimated at 555 feet (169 m), and is regarded as the longest home run in Wrigley Field history.

== Individual awards ==
=== Rookie of the Year ===
- 1961 – Billy Williams
- 1962 – Ken Hubbs
- 1989 – Jerome Walton
- 1998 – Kerry Wood
- 2008 – Geovany Soto
- 2015 – Kris Bryant

=== Most valuable player ===
- 1935 – Gabby Hartnett
- 1945 – Phil Cavarretta
- 1952 – Hank Sauer
- 1958 – Ernie Banks
- 1959 – Ernie Banks
- 1984 – Ryne Sandberg
- 1987 – Andre Dawson
- 1998 – Sammy Sosa
- 2016 – Kris Bryant
- 2026 – Pete Crow-Armstrong

=== Cy Young Award ===
- 1971 – Ferguson Jenkins
- 1979 – Bruce Sutter
- 1984 – Rick Sutcliffe
- 1992 – Greg Maddux
- 2015 – Jake Arrieta

== Rivalries ==
=== Crosstown Classic: Chicago White Sox ===
The terms "North Siders" and "South Siders" are synonymous with the respective teams and their fans, setting up an enduring rivalry. The White Sox currently lead the regular season series 78–70. The BP Crosstown Cup was introduced in 2010 and the White Sox have won the trophy eight times compared to the Cubs' six. There have been seven series sweeps since interleague play began: five by the Cubs in 1998, 2004, 2007, 2008, and 2013 and three by the White Sox in 1999, 2008, and 2012.

=== Milwaukee Brewers ===
The Brewers-Cubs rivalry is due mostly to the fact that the ballparks are located less than 85 miles (137 km) apart. However, this rivalry did not begin to grow until 1998, when the Brewers moved from the American League Central Division to the NL Central. Until then, the Brewers had a rivalry with the White Sox, which had become known as The I-94 Series, as both teams are just a short drive from Interstate 94. Brewers-Cubs games are consistent sellouts or near-sellouts, as fans of both teams take advantage of the relative proximity of Miller Park and Wrigley Field. The two stadiums are roughly equidistant for Cubs fans living in north-suburban Chicago; hence, fans in this region take advantage of Miller Park's larger seating and parking capacity, more modern amenities, and the certainty that the game will not be weather-delayed (due to Miller Park's roof) to attend Cubs games in Milwaukee in large numbers, enhancing the rivalry's intensity. Due to the close proximity of the ball park, many Cub fans make the drive to Miller Park which coined the nickname "Wrigley North".

=== St. Louis Cardinals ===
The Cardinals–Cubs rivalry refers to games between the St. Louis Cardinals and the Cubs. The Cubs lead the series 1,137–1,106 through 2016, while the Cardinals lead in National League pennants with 19 against the Cubs' 17. The Cubs have won 11 of those pennants in Major League Baseball's Modern Era (1901–present), while all 19 of the Cardinals' have been won since 1901. The Cardinals also have a clear edge when it comes to World Series successes, having won 11 championships to the Cubs' 3. The Cardinals have enjoyed an overwhelming advantage over their Chicago rivals in the regular season standings. In that same span the Cardinals have had 50 seasons in which their winning percentage was over .500, while the Cubs have finished over that mark 21 times (they finished at an even .500 twice). Cardinals-Cubs games see numerous visiting fans in either St. Louis' Busch Stadium or Chicago's Wrigley Field. When the National League split into two, and then three divisions, the Cardinals and Cubs remained together. This has added excitement to several pennant races over the years, most recently in 1984, 1989, 2003, 2004, 2015, and 2016; the first three times the division title was won by the Cubs, the fourth by the Cardinals, who went on to win the National League pennant as the Cubs faltered in the second half of the 2004 season. However, 2015 and 2016 were special years for the Cubs. In 2015, the Cubs finished in third place in the NL Central Division behind the Cardinals and Pirates, but they made the playoffs as the second National League Wild Card team. After defeating the Pirates 4–0 in the Wild Card game, they disposed of the Cardinals in the NLDS in four games (3–1); however, they later lost to the New York Mets in the NLCS (Mets 4- Cubs 0). In 2016, the tide really turned in a positive direction for the Chicago Cubs. They won the NL Central Division crown with a record of 103–58 which was 17.5 games ahead of the second place Cardinals (86–76). The Cubs then defeated the San Francisco Giants in the NLDS (3–1) followed by the Los Angeles Dodgers in the NLCS (4–2) to win the NL pennant for the first time since 1945. In the 2016 World Series, the Cubs ended their 108-year World Series Championship drought by defeating the Cleveland Indians in a seven-game series (4–3).

== Ownership ==
=== List of Owners ===
- 1876: William Hulbert
- 1882: Albert Spalding
- 1902: James Hart
- 1905: Charles Murphy
- 1914: Charles Taft
- 1916: Charles Weeghman/Albert Lasker (heads of an investment group with seven others including William Wrigley Jr.)
- 1921: Wrigley and Company (Wrigley family owned Wrigley Chewing Gum)
- 1981: Tribune Company
- 2007: Sam Zell
- 2009: Family trust of Joe Ricketts; chairman Thomas S. Ricketts

=== Ownership History ===
Al Spalding, who also owned Spalding sporting goods, played for the team for two seasons under club founder William Hulbert. After Hulbert's death Spalding owned the club for 21 years, after which the Cubs were purchased by Albert Lasker and Charles Weeghman. That pair were followed by the Wrigley family, owners of Wrigley's chewing gum. In 1981, after 6 decades under the Wrigley family, the Cubs were purchased by Tribune Company for $20.5 million. Tribune, which also owned the Chicago Tribune, Los Angeles Times, WGN Television, WGN Radio and many other media outlets, controlled the club until December 2007, when Sam Zell completed his purchase of the entire Tribune organization and announced his intention to sell the baseball team.

In 2008 Zell began what was basically a competition for a buyer. In late July, a long list was narrowed down to ten, and those ten prospective investors were then narrowed to three, all of whom offered over $1 billion for both the Cubs and Wrigley Field, with the presumptive fan favorites being outspoken Dallas Mavericks owner Mark Cuban and a group led by former announcer Steve Stone and Hall-of-Famer Hank Aaron. However, the list inflated back to five by August as private equity investor and Brewers minority owner John Canning Jr. and Thomas S. Ricketts, the son of Joe Ricketts were added to the "contest". The Canning move was highly scrutinized, because when Zell originally trimmed the candidates down, Canning Jr. had been eliminated, but commissioner Bud Selig had apparently picked him as a favorite of the fraternity of MLB owners. During a Chicago Bulls-Dallas Mavericks telecast on October 9, 2008, Cuban, in a courtside interview with Comcast Sports Net, claimed he had made the highest bid, and although he did not know where he stood, noted that the state of the economy would likely affect the time frame of the eventual sale. Nonetheless, on January 8, 2009, the Chicago Tribune reported that a new group of three finalists, Thomas S. Ricketts advised by Salvatore Galatioto of Galatioto Sports Partners, Hersch Klaff advised by Michael Levy of Paragon Capital Partners, and a partnership of private equity investors Marc Utay and Leo Hindery Jr., were expected to submit polished offers "within days", after which the winning bid would be accepted and, pending the winning bidders approval by 2/3 of the current MLB owners, "would be final", with Zell holding on to a minor share of the team. The Ricketts family won that bidding process as the 2009 season came to a close. Ultimately, the sale was unanimously approved by MLB owners and the Ricketts family took control on October 27, 2009.

== Media ==
=== Radio ===
The Cubs' flagship radio station is WSCR 670 AM. The Chicago Cubs Radio Network consists of 45 stations and covers at least 11 states. Pat Hughes, who did play by play for the Milwaukee Brewers prior to coming to Chicago, hosts the program along with Ron Coomer, a member of the 2001 Cubs, who became Hughes's color man in January 2014. The pre and post game shows are hosted by Zack Zaidman. Hughes and Ron Santo had a run as partners on WGN Radio, known as The Pat and Ron Show, which began when Santo, a former Cubs star and a devout fan of the team (Hughes introduced Santo as "Cub legend Ron Santo" on a daily basis) joined the Cubs' broadcast booth in 1990 and the show ended with Santo's death on December 3, 2010. The show featured Santo as the "single biggest Cubs fan of all time", who was known for his emotional highs and lows during games. One example of a "low" was his "Noooo! Noooo!" when Brant Brown dropped a fly ball in a key game in 1998. A "high" for Santo was upon the retirement of his number on the last day of the 2003 season, in which he declared his #10 flag to be "my Hall of Fame". Because Santo was a type 1 diabetic who had lost both his legs to the disease, most sponsors of the radio program centered their promotions around the Juvenile Diabetes Research Foundation and other diabetes-based charities.

=== Print ===
The club also produced its own print media; the Cubs' official magazine, VineLine, which spotlighted players and events involving the club. Vineline. VineLine, which began its run in 1986, had 12 annual issues. After a three decade run, the magazine's last issue was December 2018. VineLine continues to have a presence online with a VineLine Blog and VineLine Twitter. The club also publishes a traditional media guide.

=== Television ===
Cubs telecasts are locally aired on Marquee Sports Network, which the team and Sinclair Broadcast Group launched in 2020. As of 2024, Jon Sciambi and Jim Deshaies call a majority of the Cubs' television games, with Sciambi joining in 2021 and Deshaies in 2013. Beth Mowins, Chris Myers and Pat Hughes fill-in whenever Sciambi calls national games for ESPN.

Previously the Cubs' games were aired across four different outlets: Over broadcast television via the WGN television outlets (both the local station on Channel 9 and the superstation nationally, produced through the station's WGN Sports department), Weigel Broadcasting's WCIU-TV (Channel 26.1), ABC affiliate WLS-TV (ABC Chicago Channel 7), and on cable television over NBC Sports Chicago (of which the Ricketts family owns a 20% interest), with some games, mainly on Wednesday evenings, airing over the supplemental NBCSC+ channel. WCIU came into the fold in the early 2000s due to demands by The WB Television Network for WGN to devote more time to the network's programming, and later on the same has been expected by The CW, though WGN still does push back CW primetime programming to accommodate game broadcasts. For games aired on WCIU, the score bug changes the "WGN" logo to "WGN Sports on The U" (previously "CubsNet"). WCIU games additionally air over MyNetworkTV affiliate WMYS-LD (Channel 69) in the South Bend, Indiana market. WGN and CSN Chicago generally show an even number of Cubs games, while WCIU averages about 8 games per season.

Len Kasper previously served as the Cubs' television play-by-play announcer from 2005 to 2020, before taking the radio play-by-play job with the Chicago White Sox. Bob Brenly, a former major league catcher and Arizona Diamondbacks manager, was the Cubs' color commentator from 2004 through the 2012 season. In October 2012, Brenly announced that he would not return to the Cubs' broadcast booth for another season.

In 2009, the Chicago Cubs expressed interest in creating their own regional cable network. Crane Kenney, the Cubs' president, said that a regional network owned by the Cubs would create additional revenue streams. The hope was that this would be similar to other successful regional sports networks such as the YES Network and NESN. The only difference would be that the Cubs could not immediately broadcast Cubs games due to the existing contracts and/or ownership stakes in CSN Chicago, WGN-TV and WCIU-TV. According to Kenney, the new Cubs network would be like the MLB Network, but showing Cubs-only programming. Classic Cubs games from the past could be scheduled as well as in-depth specials. Live telecasts of the minor league affiliate Iowa Cubs games were also being considered (when there are no Cubs games scheduled or available due to contract agreements). In the past, Wayne Larrivee, Chip Caray, Thom Brennaman, Joe Carter, and Dave Otto, among others, have announced the team's games on television.

=== Jack Brickhouse and Harry Caray ===
Two broadcasters in particular have made their mark on the team. Jack Brickhouse manned the Cubs radio and especially the TV booth for parts of five decades, the 34-season span from 1948 to 1981. He covered the games with a level of enthusiasm that often seemed unjustified by the team's poor performance on the field for many of those years. His trademark call "Hey Hey!" always followed a home run. That expression is spelled out in large letters vertically on both foul pole screens at Wrigley Field. "Whoo-boy!" and "Wheeee!" and "Oh, brother!" were among his other pet expressions. When he approached retirement age, he personally recommended his successor.

Harry Caray's stamp on the team is perhaps even deeper than that of Brickhouse, although his 17-year tenure, from 1982 to 1997, was half as long. First, Caray had already become a well-known Chicago figure by broadcasting White Sox games for a decade, after having been a St Louis Cardinals icon for 25 years. Caray also had the benefit of being in the booth during the NL East title run in 1984, which was widely seen due to WGN's status as a cable-TV superstation. His trademark call of "Holy Cow!" and his enthusiastic singing of "Take me out to the ballgame" during the 7th inning stretch (as he had done with the White Sox) made Caray a fan favorite both locally and nationally. Harry occasionally had problems pronouncing names, to comic effect, such as his attempt at saying "Héctor Villanueva" which was captured on WGN's memorial CD to Harry. He also continued his long-standing bit (dating back to the Cardinals years) of pronouncing names backwards. Caray had lively discussions with commentator Steve Stone, who was hand-picked by Harry himself, and producer Arne Harris. Caray often playfully quarreled with Stone over Stone's cigar and why Stone was single, while Stone would counter with poking fun at Harry being "under the influence". Stone disclosed in his book Where's Harry? that most of this "arguing" was staged, and usually a ploy developed by Harry himself to add flavor to the broadcast. Additionally, Harry once did a commercial for Budweiser, dressed as a "Blues Brother" and parodying "Soul Man", singing "I'm a Cub fan, I'm a Bud man", while dancing with models dressed as Cubs ball girls.

The Cubs still have a "guest conductor", usually a celebrity, lead the crowd in singing "Take me out to the ballgame" during the 7th inning stretch to honor Caray's memory. The quality of their renditions and ability to sing in tune vary widely. Chicago icons often return annually, such as former Chicago Bears coach Mike Ditka, who tends to sing the song very fast and worse than awful. Caray is also honored with a statue located at the corner of Sheffield and Addison street. During the 1998 season, a permanent window with Caray's caricature was installed in the Wrigley Field broadcast booth, and a patch with the same caricature along with Brickhouse's trademark "Hey Hey" were worn on the players sleeves to honor the passing of both commentators within a span of a few months. Harry's popularity also led to his grandson Chip Caray joining the broadcast team in winter of 1997, shortly before Harry's death. Chip Caray worked the Cubs games alongside Stone until events that unfolded in 2004, when Stone became increasingly critical of management and players toward season's end. At one point, reliever Kent Mercker phoned the booth during a game and told Stone to "keep out of team business". Stone left the team, taking a position with Chicago-based WSCR, and is now an announcer for the south side team, the Chicago White Sox. Chip Caray also left, joining his father Skip Caray (who would die in 2008) on TBS, providing play-by-play for the Atlanta Braves.
