= Dexter Park (Chicago) =

Horse race track in Chicago, Illinois

Coordinates: 41°48′36″N 87°38′47″W

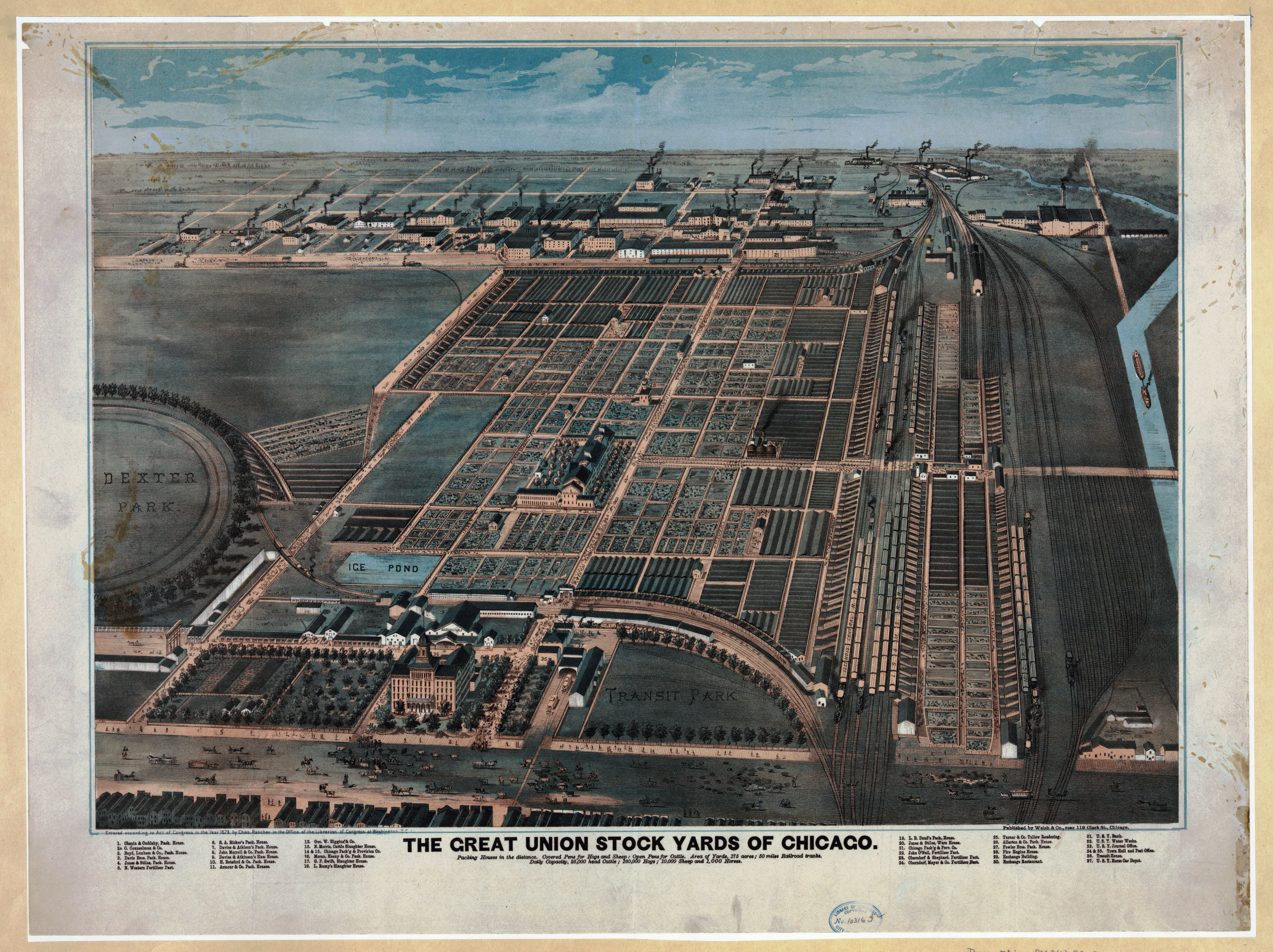
Stock Yards illustration showing Dexter Park

Dexter Park, a horse race track in Chicago, was constructed after the Civil War. Named after Dexter, a gelding and a trotter who set world records for the mile, it inspired the naming of several towns, including Dexter, Missouri, and Dexter, Texas. The track officially opened in July 1867.

That July, early baseball games at Dexter Park featured a series staged for the touring Washington Nationals. The Nationals had remained undefeated until they faced the Forest City (Rockford) club, which defeated them 29–23. This loss generated excitement for the next day’s game against the Chicago champions, the Excelsior club. The Nationals, however, beat the Excelsiors 49–4. Some Chicago fans and local newspapers accused the Nationals of being “blacklegs,” implying that they had lost to Forest City intentionally to boost interest in the Excelsior match and the accompanying wagering. The Nationals protested, and the newspapers retracted their accusations.

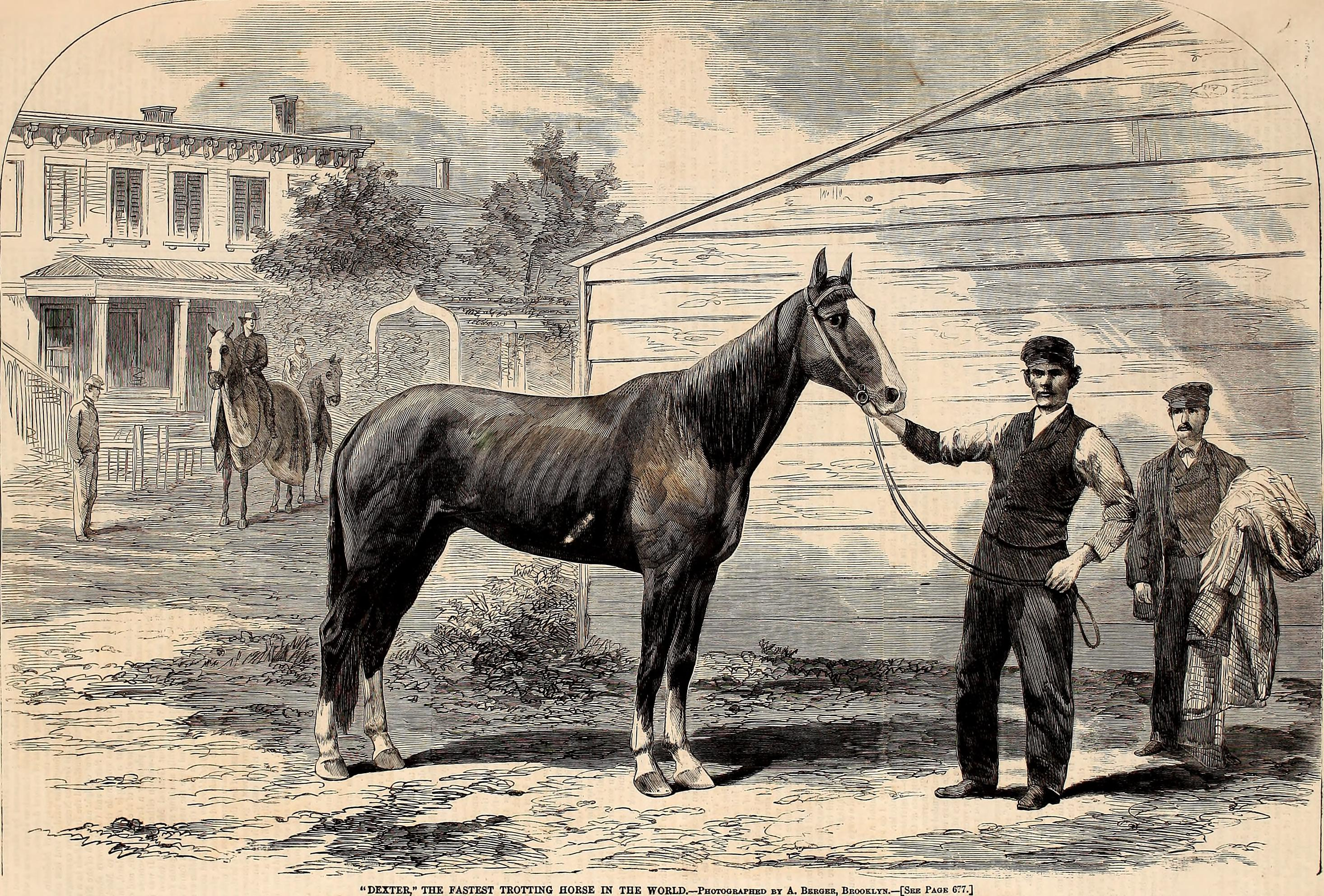
Dexter the fastest trotting horse in the world

Dexter Park served as the home field of the Chicago White Stockings, one of the oldest professional baseball clubs in existence. In 1870, Chicago’s sporting businessmen formed the White Stockings to represent Chicago as the Red Stockings had done for Cincinnati in 1869. The ball field was established within the track’s oval and featured its own small set of bleachers encircling the field.

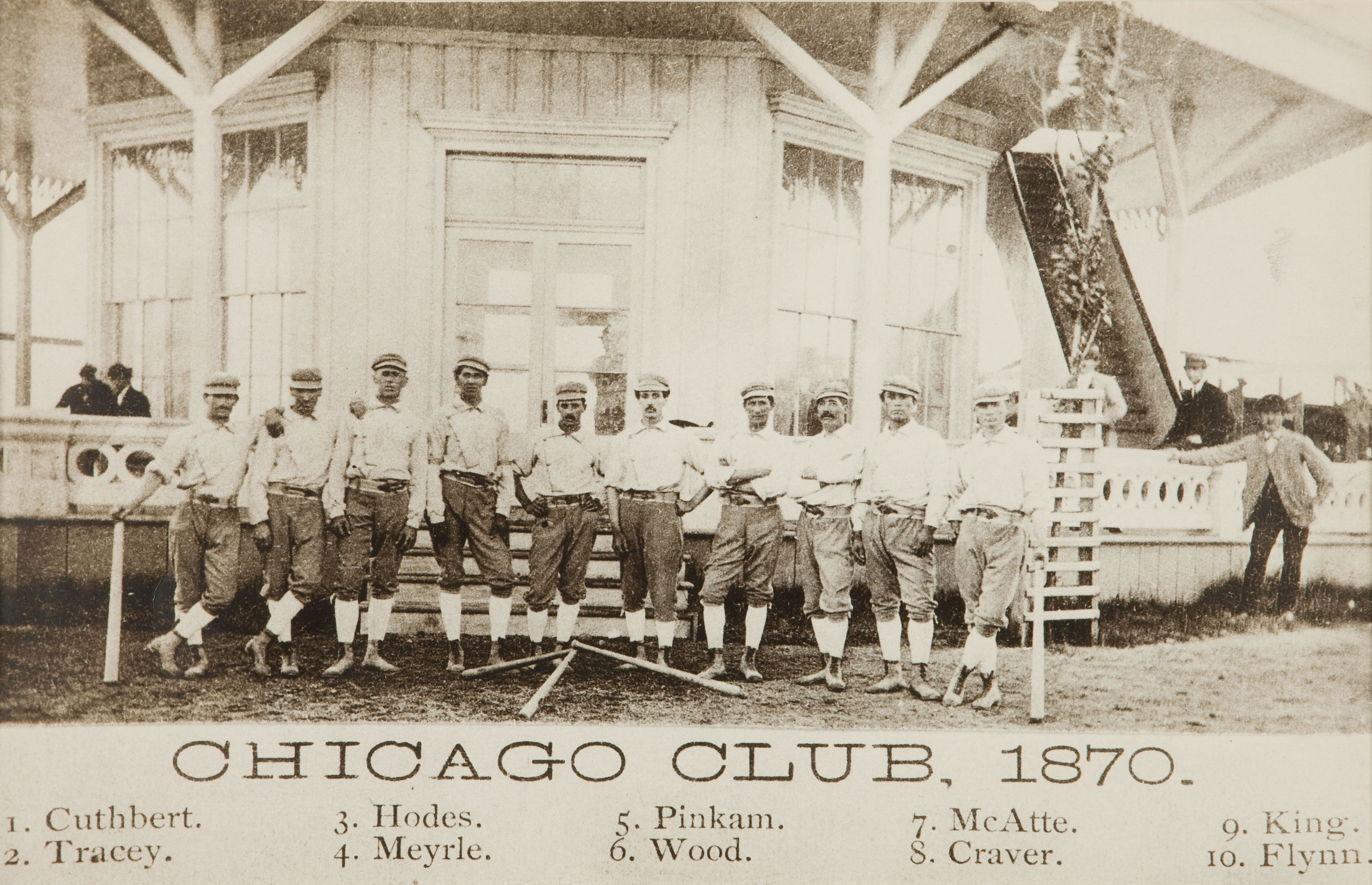
1870 White Stockings at Dexter Park judges' stand

When the National Association of Professional Base Ball Players formed in 1871, the White Stockings joined the new league and relocated to the lakefront, at Union Base-Ball Grounds. That move proved ill-fated, as it put the team's home field in the path of the Great Chicago Fire; the club did not field another professional team for two years while it nursed its financial position.

Dexter Park was situated on the west side of Halsted Street, between 47th Street to the south and the imaginary line of 42nd Street to the north. This property was owned by, and adjacent to, the Union Stock Yards. The "bird's-eye view" of the stockyards, from ca. 1878, shows part of the race track at the left edge.

The track had ceased to be a working race track by 1880. By then it had been cut through by several of the Stock Yards' local roads and railroad spurs. Its main usage had become conventions and cattle auctions. The last "race" mentioned in the local newspapers came in December 1881, a 100 yard dash contested (for betting) by two Stock Yards employees "on the old Dexter Park race track".

Dexter Park Pavilion is first mentioned in local newspapers in 1884. The Pavilion was the site of the famous wrestling bout contested between George Hackenschmidt and Frank Gotch in 1908, in what was considered professional wrestling's first true world championship bout.

By 1909, the Pavilion had been renamed the International Amphitheater (I), but the two names were used synonymously in local papers. A marathon was staged between Olympic runners Dorando Pietri and Albert Corey.

The Pavilion / Amphitheater was used for various exhibitions until May 19, 1934, when it was destroyed by fire.

A new arena, the International Amphitheater (II) was built on its site. The racetrack was commemorated by a road to the west of the arena, called Dexter Park Avenue.

Preceded by None	Home of the Chicago White Stockings (with Ogden Park); 1870	Succeeded by Union Base-Ball Grounds
