= Baltimore Canaries all-time roster =

List of baseball players

The Baltimore Canaries were a professional baseball team that existed for three seasons in the National Association, from 1872 to 1874.

== List of players ==
Players in Bold and have the symbol †, are members of the National Baseball Hall of Fame.

== B ==
- Bill Barrett
- Oscar Bielaski
- Frederick Boardman
- Asa Brainard
- Robert Brown

== C ==
- Tom Carey
- John Carl
- Bill Craver
- **Candy Cummings**^{†}

== D ==
- Harry Deane

== F ==
- Cherokee Fisher
- Davy Force

== G ==
- Joe Gerhardt
- Charlie Gould

== H ==
- George Hall
- Scott Hastings
- Dick Higham

== J ==
- Levin Jones

== K ==
- Henry Kohler

== M ==
- Jack Manning
- Bobby Mathews
- Cal McVey
- Everett Mills

== P ==
- Lip Pike

== R ==
- John Radcliffe
- Hugh Reid
- Henry Reville
- Johnny Ryan

== S ==
- Lou Say
- Frank Selman
- Bill Smiley
- John Smith
- Pop Snyder
- Charlie Sweasy

== T ==
- Zachary Taylor

== W ==
- Warren White
- Wood

== Y ==
- Tom York
