= Hartford Dark Blues all-time roster =

List of baseball players

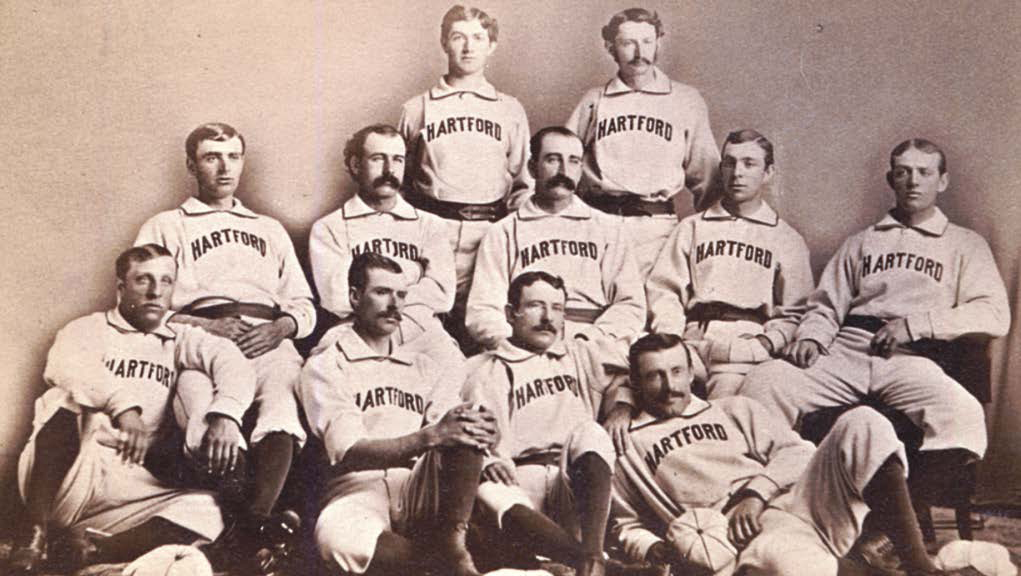
Members of the 1876 Hartford Dark Blues

The Hartford Dark Blues were a Major League Baseball club in the 1870s, based in Hartford, Connecticut, for three seasons and in Brooklyn, New York, for one. Hartford was a member of the National Association (NA), 1874–1875 and a founding member of the National League (NL) in 1876, when it played home games at the Hartford Ball Club Grounds. During 1877 the team played home games at the Union Grounds in Brooklyn and was sometimes called the Brooklyn Hartfords.

The team's owner, Morgan Bulkeley, who later became the first president of the NL in 1876, established the franchise in 1874; he gave the on-field captain duties to Lip Pike, who was also the starting center fielder. Among the other players signed by Hartford were pitcher Cherokee Fisher, who had led the NA in earned run average the two previous seasons, second baseman Bob Addy, and Scott Hastings.

After placing seventh among the league's eight teams, the team's roster was purged and captain duties were handed over to third baseman Bob Ferguson, who stayed in the role for the remaining three seasons of the franchise's existence. The change in personnel, which included the pitching additions of future Hall of Famer Candy Cummings and Tommy Bond, improved the team's results. With the team's pitching rotation stable, and the hitting of Tom Carey, Tom York, Dick Higham, and Jack Burdock, the franchise enjoyed second-place finishes in 1875 and 1876.

Following the departure of their pitching stars, Cummings and Bond, the team had to rely on Terry Larkin in 1877, who shouldered most of the pitching duties. The Dark Blues finished in third place, despite the hitting of John Cassidy, who batted .378. When Bulkeley moved his team to Brooklyn in 1877, he expected that he would make a better profit than he had in Hartford. The larger population of Brooklyn did not, however, respond in kind, and the Hartfords' fan base did not increase. He became disenchanted with his involvement in baseball, and with his interest in running the day-to-day operations of the team. Because of this and the lack of fan support, the team disbanded after the 1877 season.

== Keys ==
Abbreviations
Name	Name of the player by official records
Position	Position that player played in the field
Seasons played	The seasons played for this franchise by the player
†	Elected to the Baseball Hall of Fame
§	Player was a player-manager

Position
C	Catcher	1B	First baseman
2B	Second baseman	3B	Third baseman
SS	Shortstop	IF	Infielder
LF	Left fielder	CF	Center fielder
RF	Right fielder	OF	Outfielder
SP	Starting pitcher	RP	Relief pitcher

== List of players ==
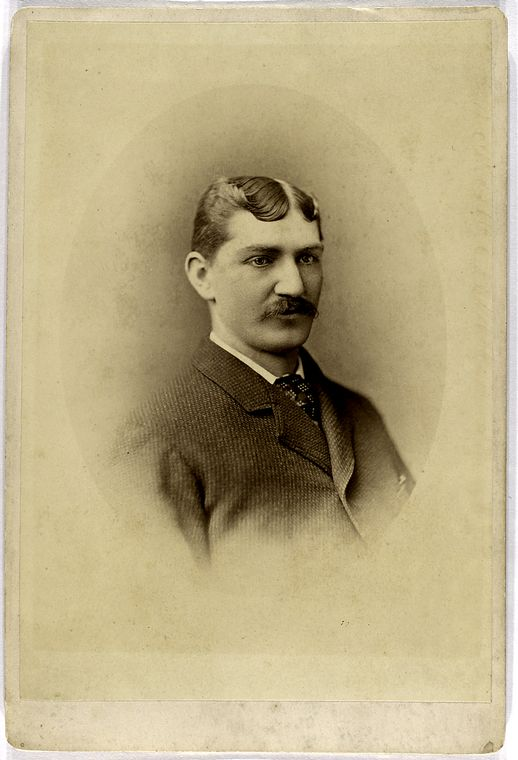
Pitcher Tommy Bond

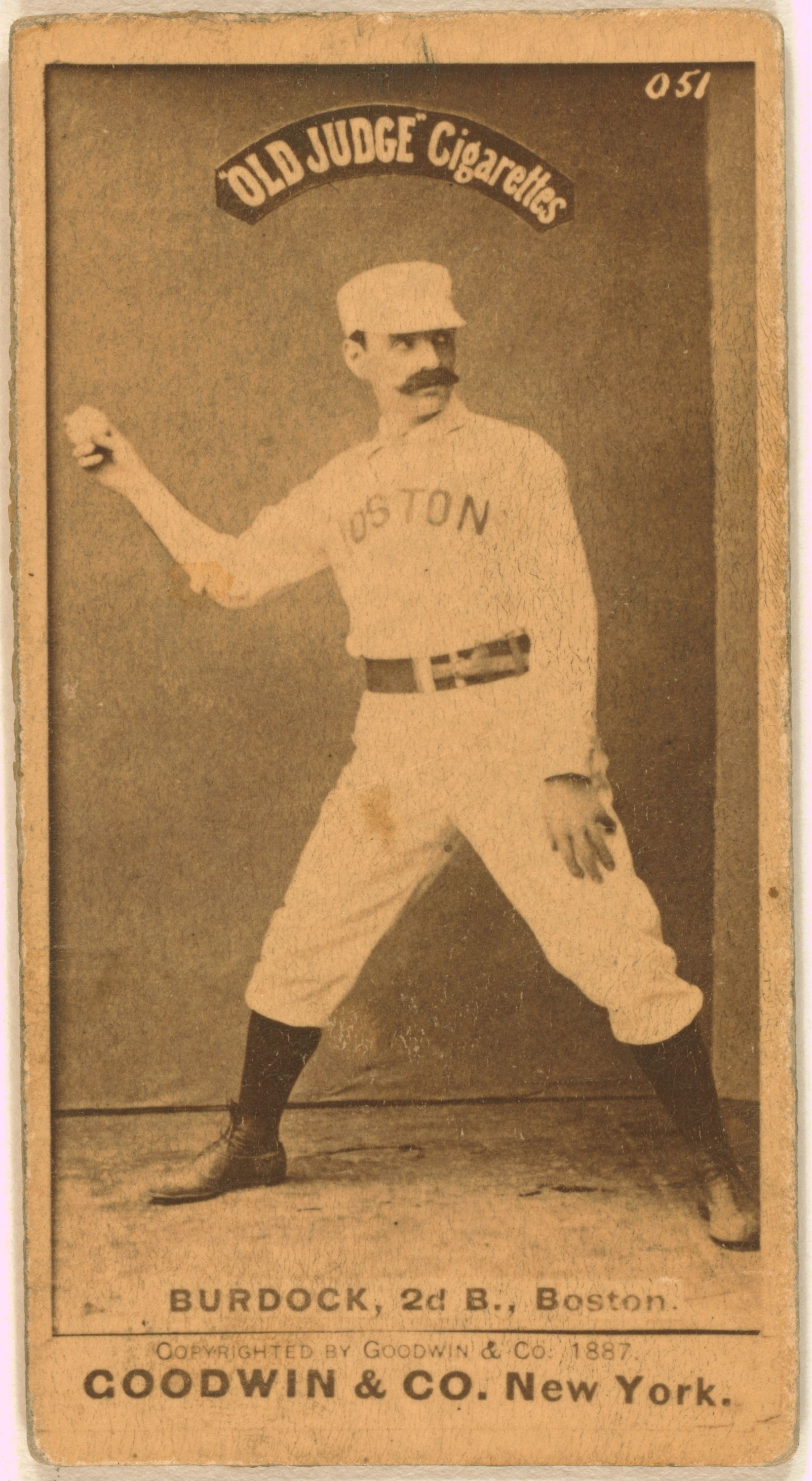
Second baseman Jack Burdock

Right fielder John Cassidy

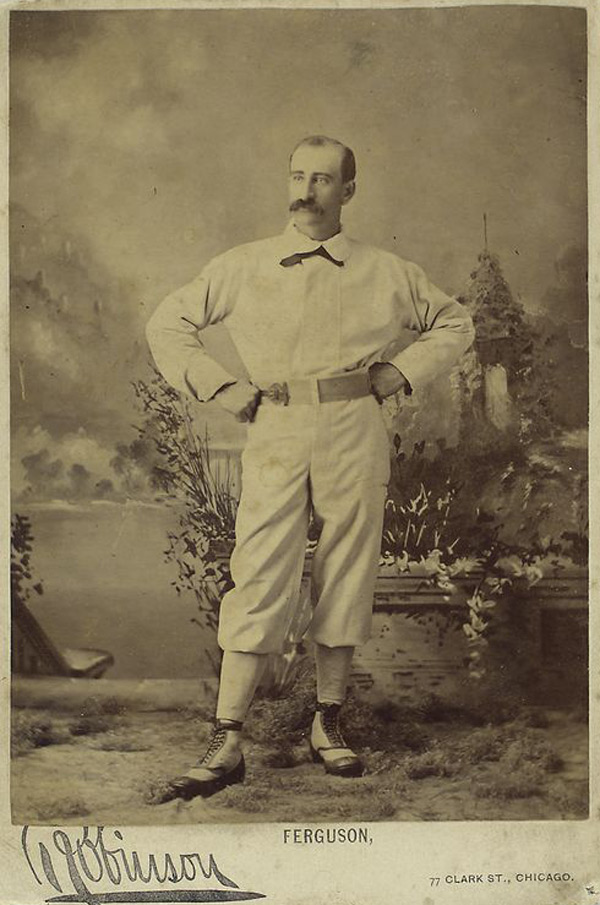
Manager and third baseman Bob Ferguson

Player	Position	Seasons	Notes	Ref
Bob Addy	2B	1874	Addy played in 50 games for one season in Hartford, and batted .239 in 213 at bats.	
Art Allison	RF	1875	Allison finished the season with Hartford after having played with Washington Nationals. He was the brother of teammate Doug Allison.	
Doug Allison	C	1875–1877	Allison was the team's catcher for their final three seasons. He was the brother of teammate Art Allison.	
Tom Barlow	SS	1874	Barlow, who had previously been the catcher for the Brooklyn Atlantics, was the team's shortstop for one season.	
Billy Barnie	RF	1874	Barnie's only season with the Dark Blues was the only season in which he played more than 19 games.	
John Bass	LF	1877	Bass' last season at the major league level, he played in one game for the Brooklyn Hartfords.	
Tommy Bond	SP	1875–1876	Bond won 19 and 31 games respectively in his two-season tenure with the Dark Blues.	
Bill Boyd	3B	1874	Boyd played 26 games at third base for the Dark Blues.	
Steve Brady	3B / OF	1874	Brady split his playing time between third base and the outfield, batting .314 in 27 games.	
Josh Bunce	LF	1877	Bunce's entire major league career consisted of a single game.	
Jack Burdock	2B	1875–1877	Burdock was the franchise's second baseman for their final three seasons. He led all NA second baseman with a .895 fielding percentage in 1875.	
Tom Carey	SS	1875–1877	Carey was a steady veteran player during his three seasons with the Dark Blues, leading all shortstops in games played each season; his total of 86 led the NA in 1875.	
John Cassidy	RF	1876–1877	Cassidy played in 12 games for the 1876 team, but followed it with a full season in 1877 and batted .378.	
Candy Cummings^{†}	SP	1875–1876	Cummings is credited as the inventor of the curveball. He played two seasons in Hartford, and won 35 games for the 1875 team.	
Jack Farrell	CF	1874	In three games, Farrell batted .385 in 13 at bats.	
Bob Ferguson^{§}	3B	1875–1877	Ferguson played third base and was player-manager for the franchise's final three seasons.	
Cherokee Fisher	SP / RF	1874	In his only season with Hartford, Fisher had a win–loss record of 13–23.	
Bill Harbridge	C / OF / IF	1875–1877	Harbridge was a utility player for his first three seasons in majors, which were the last three for the Hartford franchise.	
Scott Hastings	C / OF	1874	Hastings was a utility player during his only season in Hartford, and had a .324 batting average.	
Dick Higham	RF / C	1876	In his only season in Hartford, Higham had a .327 batting average, and led the NL with 21 doubles.	
Jim Holdsworth	CF	1877	Holdsworth's only season in Hartford was his last full season of his major league career.	
Charley Jones	CF	1875	Jones played in one game for Hartford, which was his first season of his major league career.	
Terry Larkin	SP	1875	Larkin pitched one season with the Dark Blues, and had a win–loss record of 29–25.	
John Maloney	CF	1877	Maloney's one game played with the Dark Blues was the last game of his major league career.	
Jack Manning	3B	1874	Manning's time with Hartford consisted of one game.	
Everett Mills	1B	1874–1876	Mills was the Dark Blues' first baseman for the first three seasons of the franchise's history.	
Fancy O'Neil	RF	1874	O'Neil's major league career consisted of a single game.	
Israel Pike	RF	1877	Pike played in one game, and was the brother of Lip Pike, who had played for the Dark Blues in 1874.	
Lip Pike^{§}	CF / SS	1874	Pike was a player-manager in 1874 team, and was the brother of Israel Pike, who played for the Dark Blues in 1877.	
Paddy Quinn	C / OF	1875	Quinn's time in Hartford consisted of five games.	
Jack Remsen	CF	1875–1876	Remsen was the Dark Blues' center fielder for two full seasons.	
Orator Shaffer	LF	1874	Shaffer's only season in Hartford was the first of his 13-season major league career.	
Joe Start	1B	1877	Start was the Dark Blues' first baseman for their season in Brooklyn.	
Bill Stearns	SP / RP	1874	In Stearns' one season for Hartford, he had a 3–14 win–loss record.	
Live Oak Taylor	LF	1877	Taylor appeared in two games for the Brooklyn team.	
Jim Tipper	LF	1874	Tipper played one full season as the Dark Blues' left fielder.	
Tom York	LF	1875–1877	York played for the franchise during their final three seasons, and led the NL in games played with 86 in 1875.	
