= 1874 Baltimore Canaries season =

1874 Baltimore Canaries
- League: National Association of Professional Base Ball Players
- Ballpark: Newington Park
- City: Baltimore, Maryland
- Record: 9–38 (.191)
- League place: 8th
- Manager: Warren White

The Baltimore Canaries played their final season in 1874 as a member of the National Association of Professional Base Ball Players. They finished eighth in the league with a record of 9–38.

== Regular season ==
=== Season standings ===
National Association	W	L	GB	Pct.
Boston Red Stockings	52	18	–	.743
New York Mutuals	42	23	7.5	.646
Philadelphia Athletics	33	22	11.5	.600
Philadelphia White Stockings	29	29	17.0	.500
Chicago White Stockings	28	31	18.5	.474
Brooklyn Atlantics	22	33	22.5	.400
Hartford Dark Blues	16	37	27.5	.302
Baltimore Canaries	9	38	31.5	.191

=== Record vs. opponents ===
1874 National Association Records Sources:
Team	BAL	BOS	BR	CHI	HAR	NY	PHA	PWS
Baltimore	—	1–9	1–3	1–9	2–3	1–8	2–2	1–4
Boston	9–1	—	6–4–1	7–3	9–1	5–5	8–2	8–2
Brooklyn	3–1	4–6–1	—	3–4	5–3	3–7	1–6	3–6
Chicago	9–1	3–7	4–3	—	4–1	1–9	4–3	3–7
Hartford	3–2	1–9	3–5	1–4	—	2–8	2–5	4–4
New York	8–1	5–5	7–3	9–1	8–2	—	4–6	1–5
Philadelphia Athletics	2–2	2–8	6–1	3–4	5–2	6–4	—	9–1
Philadelphia White Stockings	4–1	2–8	6–3	7–3	4–4	5–1	1–9	—

=== Roster ===
1874 Baltimore Canaries
Roster
Pitchers: Asa Brainard; Catchers: John Carl; Pop Snyder	Infielders: Robert Brown; Joe Gerhardt; Charlie Gould; Henry Kohler; Jack Manning; Lou Say; Frank Sellman; Bill Smiley; John Smith; Charlie Sweasy; Zachary Taylor; Warren White; Wood	Outfielders: Oscar Bielaski; Frederick Boardman; Harry Deane; Levin Jones; Hugh Reid; Henry Reville; Johnny Ryan	Manager: Warren White

== Player stats ==
=== Batting ===
Note: G = Games played; AB = At bats; H = Hits; Avg. = Batting average; HR = Home runs; RBI = Runs batted in

Player	G	AB	H	Avg.	HR	RBI
Pop Snyder	39	151	33	.219	1	17
Charlie Gould	33	143	32	.224	0	14
Jack Manning	42	174	61	.351	0	18
Lou Say	18	66	14	.212	0	5
Warren White	45	211	57	.270	0	17
Johnny Ryan	47	181	35	.193	0	19
Oscar Bielaski	43	187	45	.241	0	8
Harry Deane	47	203	50	.246	0	13
Joe Gerhardt	14	61	19	.311	0	6
Frank Sellman	12	54	16	.296	0	7
Zachary Taylor	13	48	12	.250	0	3
Charlie Sweasy	8	33	8	.242	0	4
John Smith	6	21	4	.190	0	1
Robert Brown	2	9	0	.000	0	0
Levin Jones	2	7	1	.143	0	1
Wood	1	5	0	.000	0	0
Frederick Boardman	1	4	1	.250	0	0
Henry Reville	1	4	0	.000	0	0
Hugh Reid	1	4	0	.000	0	0
Henry Kohler	1	4	0	.000	0	0
John Carl	1	3	0	.000	0	0

=== Starting pitchers ===
Note: G = Games pitched; IP = Innings pitched; W = Wins; L = Losses; ERA = Earned run average; SO = Strikeouts

Player	G	IP	W	L	ERA	SO
Asa Brainard	30	240.0	5	22	3.71	8
Jack Manning	22	176.2	4	16	2.09	12

==== Relief pitchers ====
Note: G = Games pitched; W = Wins; L = Losses; SV = Saves; ERA = Earned run average; SO = Strikeouts

Player	G	W	L	SV	ERA	SO
Johnny Ryan	1	0	0	0	16.20	0
