= 1874 Brooklyn Atlantics season =

1874 Brooklyn Atlantics
- League: National Association of Professional Base Ball Players
- Ballpark: Union Grounds
- City: Brooklyn, New York
- Record: 22–33 (.400)
- League place: 6th
- Manager: Bob Ferguson

The Brooklyn Atlantics played in 1874 as a member of the National Association of Professional Base Ball Players. They finished sixth in the league with a record of 22–33.

== Regular season ==
=== Season standings ===
National Association	W	L	T	Pct.	GB
Boston Red Stockings	52	18	1	.739	—
New York Mutuals	42	23	—	.646	7½
Philadelphia Athletics	33	22	—	.600	11½
Philadelphia White Stockings	29	29	—	.500	17
Chicago White Stockings	28	31	—	.475	18½
Brooklyn Atlantics	22	33	1	.402	22½
Hartford Dark Blues	16	37	—	.302	27½
Baltimore Canaries	9	38	—	.191	31½

=== Record vs. opponents ===
1874 National Association Records Sources:
Team	BAL	BOS	BR	CHI	HAR	NY	PHA	PWS
Baltimore	—	1–9	1–3	1–9	2–3	1–8	2–2	1–4
Boston	9–1	—	6–4–1	7–3	9–1	5–5	8–2	8–2
Brooklyn	3–1	4–6–1	—	3–4	5–3	3–7	1–6	3–6
Chicago	9–1	3–7	4–3	—	4–1	1–9	4–3	3–7
Hartford	3–2	1–9	3–5	1–4	—	2–8	2–5	4–4
New York	8–1	5–5	7–3	9–1	8–2	—	4–6	1–5
Philadelphia Athletics	2–2	2–8	6–1	3–4	5–2	6–4	—	9–1
Philadelphia White Stockings	4–1	2–8	6–3	7–3	4–4	5–1	1–9	—

=== Roster ===
1874 Brooklyn Atlantics
Roster
Pitchers: Tommy Bond; Catchers: Frank Fleet; Jake Knodell; Mike Ledwith; Charlie Snow	Infielders: Jim Clinton; Herman Dehlman; John Farrow; Bob Ferguson; Tom McGovern; Jim Hall; Henry Kessler; Al Martin; Dickey Pearce; Charlie Sweasy; Billy West	Outfielders: Eddie Booth; Jack Chapman; Bobby Clack; Charlie Hodes; Pat McGee	Managers: Bob Ferguson

== Player stats ==
=== Batting ===
Note: G = Games played; AB = At bats; H = Hits; Avg. = Batting average; HR = Home runs; RBI = Runs batted in

Player	G	AB	H	Avg.	HR	RBI
Jake Knowdell	24	86	12	.140	0	3
Herman Dehlman	53	218	49	.225	0	18
John Farrow	27	122	26	.213	0	10
Dickey Pearce	56	255	75	.294	0	26
Bob Ferguson	56	245	64	.261	0	19
Eddie Booth	44	185	47	.254	1	16
Bobby Clack	33	135	23	.170	0	13
Jack Chapman	53	242	64	.264	0	24
Frank Fleet	22	97	22	.227	0	10
Charlie Hodes	21	81	12	.148	0	7
Pat McGee	16	65	11	.169	0	6
Henry Kessler	14	56	17	.304	0	4
Charlie Sweasy	10	44	5	.114	0	3
Billy West	9	35	8	.229	0	2
Al Martin	7	29	4	.138	0	1
Jim Clinton	2	11	2	.182	0	2
Jim Hall	2	9	1	.111	0	0
Tom McGovern	1	4	0	.000	0	0
Mike Ledwith	1	4	1	.250	0	1
Charlie Snow	1	1	1	1.000	0	0

=== Starting pitchers ===
Note: G = Games pitched; IP = Innings pitched; W = Wins; L = Losses; ERA = Earned run average; SO = Strikeouts

Player	G	IP	W	L	ERA	SO
Tommy Bond	55	497.0	22	32	2.03	42
Bob Ferguson	1	9.0	0	1	4.00	0
