= 1874 Philadelphia White Stockings season =

1874 Philadelphia White Stockings
- League: National Association of Professional Base Ball Players
- Ballpark: Jefferson Street Grounds
- City: Philadelphia, Pennsylvania
- Record: 29–29 (.500)
- League place: 4th
- Manager: Bill Craver

The Philadelphia White Stockings played in 1874 as a member of the National Association of Professional Base Ball Players. They finished fourth in the league with a record of 29–29.

== Regular season ==
=== Season standings ===
National Association	W	L	T	Pct.	GB
Boston Red Stockings	52	18	1	.739	—
New York Mutuals	42	23	—	.646	7½
Philadelphia Athletics	33	22	—	.600	11½
Philadelphia White Stockings	29	29	—	.500	17
Chicago White Stockings	28	31	—	.475	18½
Brooklyn Atlantics	22	33	1	.402	22½
Hartford Dark Blues	16	37	—	.302	27½
Baltimore Canaries	9	38	—	.191	31½

=== Record vs. opponents ===
1874 National Association Records Sources:
Team	BAL	BOS	BR	CHI	HAR	NY	PHA	PWS
Baltimore	—	1–9	1–3	1–9	2–3	1–8	2–2	1–4
Boston	9–1	—	6–4–1	7–3	9–1	5–5	8–2	8–2
Brooklyn	3–1	4–6–1	—	3–4	5–3	3–7	1–6	3–6
Chicago	9–1	3–7	4–3	—	4–1	1–9	4–3	3–7
Hartford	3–2	1–9	3–5	1–4	—	2–8	2–5	4–4
New York	8–1	5–5	7–3	9–1	8–2	—	4–6	1–5
Philadelphia Athletics	2–2	2–8	6–1	3–4	5–2	6–4	—	9–1
Philadelphia White Stockings	4–1	2–8	6–3	7–3	4–4	5–1	1–9	—

=== Roster ===
1874 Philadelphia Whites
Roster
Pitchers: Candy Cummings; Catchers: Nat Hicks	Infielders: Bill Craver; Chick Fulmer; Jim Holdsworth; Denny Mack; Frank McKenna; Quinlan	Outfielders: George Bechtel; John Donnelly; Dave Eggler; Charlie Pabor; John Radcliffe; Tom York	Managers: Bill Craver

== Player stats ==
=== Batting ===
Note: G = Games played; AB = At bats; H = Hits; Avg. = Batting average; HR = Home runs; RBI = Runs batted in

Player	G	AB	H	Avg.	HR	RBI
Nat Hicks	58	266	73	.274	0	30
Denny Mack	56	246	51	.207	0	22
Bill Craver	55	265	91	.343	0	56
Chick Fulmer	57	258	72	.279	0	37
Jim Holdsworth	57	285	97	.340	0	37
Tom York	50	224	56	.250	0	37
George Bechtel	32	151	42	.278	1	34
Dave Eggler	58	299	95	.318	0	31
John Radcliff	23	103	25	.243	1	14
Charlie Pabor	17	77	17	.221	0	1
John Donnelly	6	22	5	.227	0	2
Quinlan	1	4	1	.250	0	1
Frank McKenna	1	4	0	.000	0	0

=== Starting pitchers ===
Note: G = Games pitched; IP = Innings pitched; W = Wins; L = Losses; ERA = Earned run average; SO = Strikeouts

Player	G	IP	W	L	ERA	SO
Candy Cummings	54	483.0	28	26	1.96	61
George Bechtel	6	39.0	1	3	1.62	0
