= 1874 Hartford Dark Blues season =

Major League Baseball season

1874 Hartford Dark Blues
- League: National Association of Professional Base Ball Players
- Ballpark: Hartford Ball Club Grounds
- City: Hartford, Connecticut
- Record: 16–37 (.302)
- League place: 7th
- Owner: Morgan Bulkeley
- Manager: Lip Pike

The Hartford Dark Blues were formed by Morgan Bulkeley and joined the National Association of Professional Base Ball Players for the 1874 season. They finished in seventh place in their debut.

== Regular season ==
=== Season standings ===
National Association	W	L	T	Pct.	GB
Boston Red Stockings	52	18	1	.739	—
New York Mutuals	42	23	—	.646	7½
Philadelphia Athletics	33	22	—	.600	11½
Philadelphia White Stockings	29	29	—	.500	17
Chicago White Stockings	28	31	—	.475	18½
Brooklyn Atlantics	22	33	1	.402	22½
Hartford Dark Blues	16	37	—	.302	27½
Baltimore Canaries	9	38	—	.191	31½

=== Record vs. opponents ===
1874 National Association Records Sources:
Team	BAL	BOS	BR	CHI	HAR	NY	PHA	PWS
Baltimore	—	1–9	1–3	1–9	2–3	1–8	2–2	1–4
Boston	9–1	—	6–4–1	7–3	9–1	5–5	8–2	8–2
Brooklyn	3–1	4–6–1	—	3–4	5–3	3–7	1–6	3–6
Chicago	9–1	3–7	4–3	—	4–1	1–9	4–3	3–7
Hartford	3–2	1–9	3–5	1–4	—	2–8	2–5	4–4
New York	8–1	5–5	7–3	9–1	8–2	—	4–6	1–5
Philadelphia Athletics	2–2	2–8	6–1	3–4	5–2	6–4	—	9–1
Philadelphia White Stockings	4–1	2–8	6–3	7–3	4–4	5–1	1–9	—

=== Roster ===
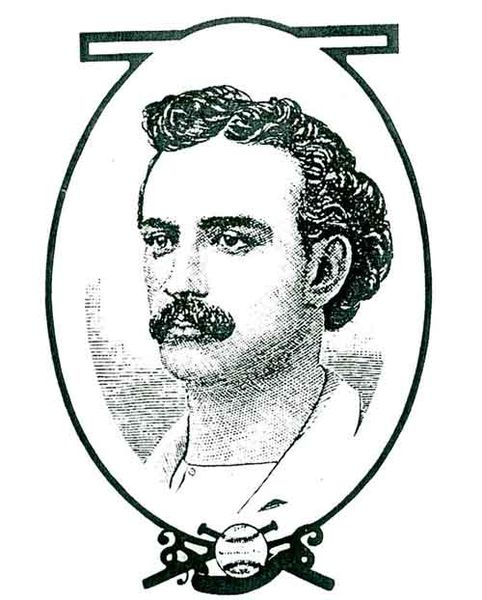
Manager and outfielder Lip Pike

1874 Hartford Dark Blues roster
Roster
Pitchers: Cherokee Fisher; Bill Stearns	Catchers: Scott Hastings; Infielders: Bob Addy; Tom Barlow; Bill Boyd; Steve Brady; Jack Manning; Everett Mills	Outfielders: Billy Barnie; Jack Farrell; Fancy O'Neil; Lip Pike; Orator Shafer; Jim Tipper	Manager: Lip Pike

== Player stats ==
=== Batting ===
Note: G = Games played; AB = At bats; H = Hits; Avg. = Batting average; HR = Home runs; RBI = Runs batted in

Player	G	AB	H	Avg.	HR	RBI
Scott Hastings	52	247	80	.324	0	30
Everett Mills	53	244	69	.283	0	19
Bob Addy	50	213	51	.239	0	22
Tom Barlow	32	155	46	.297	0	12
Bill Boyd	26	117	41	.350	0	19
Lip Pike	52	234	83	.355	1	50
Jim Tipper	45	197	60	.305	0	19
Billy Barnie	45	190	35	.184	0	20
Steve Brady	27	118	37	.314	0	14
Orator Shafer	9	35	8	.229	1	3
Jack Farrell	3	13	5	.385	0	0
Jack Manning	1	5	1	.200	0	0
Fancy O'Neil	1	3	0	.000	0	0

=== Starting pitchers ===
Note: G = Games pitched; IP = Innings pitched; W = Wins; L = Losses; ERA = Earned run average; SO = Strikeouts

Player	G	IP	W	L	ERA	SO
Cherokee Fisher	39	322.1	13	23	2.32	25
Bill Stearns	22	158.2	3	14	2.95	14
