= 1874 Chicago White Stockings season =

1874 Chicago White Stockings
- League: National Association of Professional Base Ball Players
- Ballpark: 23rd Street Grounds
- City: Chicago
- Record: 28–31 (.475)
- League place: 5th
- Owners: George Gage
- Managers: Fergy Malone, Jimmy Wood

The 1874 Chicago White Stockings season was the third season of the Chicago White Stockings franchise, the second in the National Association of Professional Base Ball Players and the first at 23rd Street Grounds. The White Stockings returned to the league in 1874 after taking two years to recover from the chaos of the Great Chicago Fire. They opened their season on Wednesday May 13 hosting the Philadelphia Athletics and shut them out 4 to 0. They finished fifth in the National Association with a record of 28–31.

== Regular season ==
=== Season standings ===
| National Association | W | L | T | Pct. | GB |
|---|---|---|---|---|---|
| Boston Red Stockings | 52 | 18 | 1 | .739 | — |
| New York Mutuals | 42 | 23 | — | .646 | 7½ |
| Philadelphia Athletics | 33 | 22 | — | .600 | 11½ |
| Philadelphia White Stockings | 29 | 29 | — | .500 | 17 |
| Chicago White Stockings | 28 | 31 | — | .475 | 18½ |
| Brooklyn Atlantics | 22 | 33 | 1 | .402 | 22½ |
| Hartford Dark Blues | 16 | 37 | — | .302 | 27½ |
| Baltimore Canaries | 9 | 38 | — | .191 | 31½ |

=== Record vs. opponents ===
1874 National Association Records Sources:
| Team | BAL | BOS | BR | CHI | HAR | NY | PHA | PWS |
|---|---|---|---|---|---|---|---|---|
| Baltimore | — | 1–9 | 1–3 | 1–9 | 2–3 | 1–8 | 2–2 | 1–4 |
| Boston | 9–1 | — | 6–4–1 | 7–3 | 9–1 | 5–5 | 8–2 | 8–2 |
| Brooklyn | 3–1 | 4–6–1 | — | 3–4 | 5–3 | 3–7 | 1–6 | 3–6 |
| Chicago | 9–1 | 3–7 | 4–3 | — | 4–1 | 1–9 | 4–3 | 3–7 |
| Hartford | 3–2 | 1–9 | 3–5 | 1–4 | — | 2–8 | 2–5 | 4–4 |
| New York | 8–1 | 5–5 | 7–3 | 9–1 | 8–2 | — | 4–6 | 1–5 |
| Philadelphia Athletics | 2–2 | 2–8 | 6–1 | 3–4 | 5–2 | 6–4 | — | 9–1 |
| Philadelphia White Stockings | 4–1 | 2–8 | 6–3 | 7–3 | 4–4 | 5–1 | 1–9 | — |

== Roster ==
1874 Chicago White Stockings
Roster
| Pitchers: George Zettlein; Catchers: Terry Connell; Henry Gilroy; Fergy Malone | Infielders: Jim Devlin; Davy Force; John Glenn; Levi Meyerle; John Peters | Outfielders: Dan Collins; Ned Cuthbert; Paul Hines; Fred Treacey | Manager: Fergy Malone; Jimmy Wood |

== Player stats ==
=== Batting ===
Note: G = Games played; AB = At bats; H = Hits; Avg. = Batting average; HR = Home runs; RBI = Runs batted in

| Player | G | AB | H | Avg. | HR | RBI |
|---|---|---|---|---|---|---|
| Fergy Malone | 47 | 223 | 56 | .251 | 0 | 28 |
| John Glenn | 55 | 237 | 67 | .283 | 0 | 32 |
| Levi Meyerle | 53 | 254 | 100 | .394 | 1 | 45 |
| John Peters | 55 | 239 | 69 | .289 | 1 | 25 |
| Davy Force | 59 | 294 | 92 | .313 | 0 | 26 |
| Fred Treacey | 35 | 148 | 28 | .189 | 0 | 12 |
| Ned Cuthbert | 58 | 295 | 79 | .268 | 2 | 24 |
| Paul Hines | 59 | 271 | 80 | .295 | 0 | 34 |
| Jim Devlin | 45 | 203 | 58 | .286 | 0 | 26 |
| Henry Gilroy | 8 | 38 | 8 | .211 | 0 | 7 |
| Dan Collins | 3 | 12 | 1 | .083 | 0 | 0 |
| Terry Connell | 1 | 4 | 0 | .000 | 0 | 0 |

=== Starting pitchers ===
Note: G = Games pitched; IP = Innings pitched; W = Wins; L = Losses; ERA = Earned run average; SO = Strikeouts

| Player | G | IP | W | L | ERA | SO |
|---|---|---|---|---|---|---|
| George Zettlein | 57 | 515.2 | 27 | 30 | 2.43 | 26 |
| Dan Collins | 2 | 11.0 | 1 | 1 | 4.91 | 0 |

==== Relief pitchers ====
Note: G = Games pitched; W = Wins; L = Losses; SV = Saves; ERA = Earned run average; SO = Strikeouts

| Player | G | W | L | SV | ERA | SO |
|---|---|---|---|---|---|---|
| Davy Force | 1 | 0 | 0 | 0 | 15.43 | 0 |
