= Tom Barlow (baseball) =

American baseball player

- Catcher / Shortstop
- Born: 1852; New York, U.S.
- Died: Unknown
- Batted: Unknown Threw: Unknown

MLB debut
- May 2, 1872, for the Brooklyn Atlantics

Last MLB appearance
- July 30, 1875, for the Brooklyn Atlantics

MLB statistics
- Batting average: .290
- Runs scored: 120
- Runs batted in: 32
- Stats at Baseball Reference

Teams
- Brooklyn Atlantics (1872–1873), (1875); Hartford Dark Blues (1874); New Haven Elm Citys (1875)

Thomas H. Barlow (1852–?) was an American Major League Baseball player who played as a catcher and shortstop for three different teams in his entire four-year career, spent entirely in the National Association. Barlow is credited as the pioneer of the bunt.

== Career ==
In 1871, Barlow played catcher and shortstop in for the Star club of Brooklyn, who were one of the top amateur teams in the country. The Stars played many exhibition games against professional teams from the newly-established National Association. They won the championship of the short-lived National Association of Amateur Base Ball Players, and are credited with a 30-13 won-loss record. Future Hall of Famer Candy Cummings was one of Barlow's teammates.

Barlow moved up to the next level the next season in 1872, beginning his professional career with the National Association's Brooklyn Atlantics. He played 37 championship games, most of them as catcher, along with four games at shortstop. He hit well that season, hitting .310, and scored 34 runs. In 1873, he caught 53 games, becoming the second player credited with catching all of his team's games, a feat that has been accomplished just seven times, the latest occurring in 1945 when Mike Tresh caught all 150 of the Chicago White Sox' games.

Barlow stated several years after the fact that he sustained an injury to his side during the 1874 season while catching pitcher Cherokee Fisher, while playing for the Hartford Dark Blues. Later, when he was being treated at his hotel room, a physician administered a morphine injection, which began his addiction to the drug, and subsequently, he lost his baseball career to it. Barlow documented his troubles in a letter, which is read by actor David Caruso in Ken Burns's 1994 documentary, Baseball. In the letter, he lamented on how he was once the catcher for the Mutuals, and the Atlantics, "but no one would know it by looking at me now." He also said "I'd had rather died behind the bat, than have had that first dose."

The specific details in the letter are mostly, but not totally, supported by the historical record. Fisher and Barlow were indeed teammates with the 1874 Hartford Dark Blues. Fisher started 35 of the Dark Blues' 53 games. Barlow was however a shortstop that season, playing in 32 games. Barlow says the injury happened when the Dark Blues were playing the Chicago White Stockings in Chicago on August 10, 1874, but the record shows that on that date the Dark Blues were playing at home against the Philadelphia Athletics, and Bill Stearns was Hartford's starting pitcher.

Barlow was taken out in the middle of the game that day, which was highly unusual at the time. He skipped Hartford's next game, but returned to the lineup for five games, before missing the rest of the season. His last appearance on September 10, 1874 was indeed against the White Stockings, but it was a home game for the Dark Blues. He was hospitalized for a while in the fall of 1874, and at one point was rumored to have died.

During the 1874-1875 off-season, he was one of several players who got into trouble by signing contracts with multiple National Association teams. He accepted advance payments from his old team the Atlantics as well as the newly-admitted New Haven Elm Citys.

Barlow ended up playing two National Association games in 1875, one each for the Elm Citys and the Atlantics. The 1875 Atlantics set a major-league record for futility which still stands: their won-loss record was 2-42 (.045). Ironically, the Atlantics' wins were both against New Haven, whose won-loss record was 7-40 (.149). It is unknown if Barlow participated in either game. It is known that Barlow played the second and last game of his season with the Atlantics on July 30, 1875. He was their second baseman for their 6-3 loss at home to the Chicago White Stockings.

In September 1877, Barlow was arrested for shoplifting in New York City. He told the court that he was under the influence of opium, and that his addiction began four years earlier when he was a catcher for Hartford. (In 1873, he was a catcher, but with the Brooklyn Atlantics.)

Currently, there is no information of his life after baseball, to include where he lived, or where he died. He can be found in the 1880 census as living with his parents in Brooklyn and his occupation is listed as "ball player."
