= Bob Ferguson (infielder) =

American baseball player, manager, umpire, and executive (1845–1894)

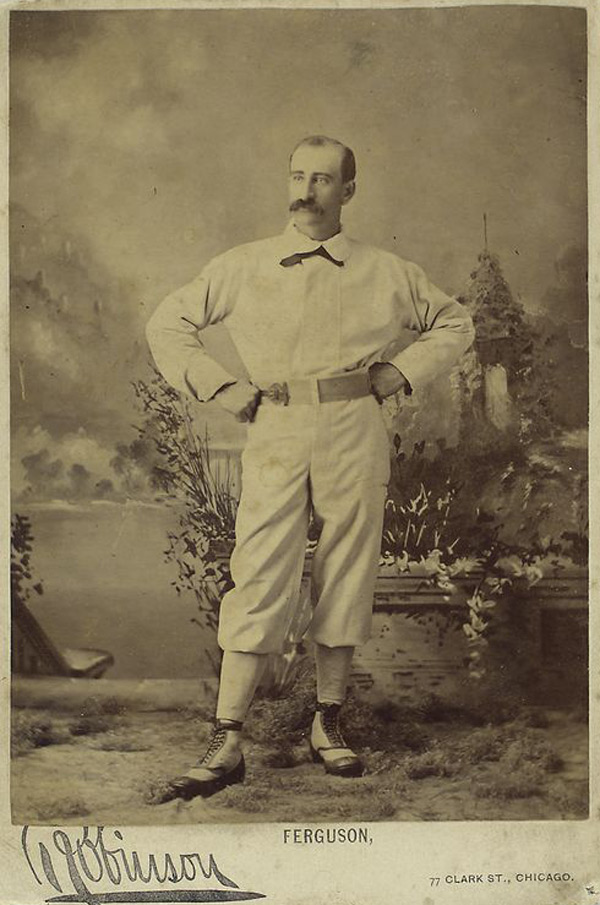
- Third baseman / Second baseman / Catcher / Manager / Umpire
- Born: January 31, 1845; Brooklyn, New York, U.S.
- Died: May 3, 1894 (aged 49); Brooklyn, New York, U.S.
- Batted: Switch Threw: Right

Major league debut
- May 18, 1871, for the New York Mutuals

Last major league appearance
- July 1, 1884, for the Pittsburgh Alleghenys

Major league statistics
- Batting average: .265
- Home runs: 1
- Runs batted in: 357
- Managerial record: 417–516–16
- Stats at Baseball Reference
- Managerial record at Baseball Reference

Teams
- National Association of Base Ball Players Enterprise of Brooklyn (1865) Brooklyn Atlantics (1866–1870) League player New York Mutuals (1871) Brooklyn Atlantics (1872–1874) Hartford Dark Blues (1875–1877) Chicago White Stockings (1878) Troy Trojans (1879–1882) Philadelphia Quakers (1883) Pittsburgh Alleghenys (1884) League manager New York Mutuals (1871) Brooklyn Atlantics (1872–1874) Hartford Dark Blues (1875–1877) Chicago White Stockings (1878) Troy Trojans (1879–1882) Philadelphia Quakers (1883) Pittsburgh Alleghenys (1884) New York Metropolitans (1886–1887)

Career highlights and awards
- Served as President of National Association (1872–1875); Led the National League in on-base percentage (1878); Held major league record for career games as an umpire (1890–1893), with a final total of 786

Robert Vavasour Ferguson (January 31, 1845 – May 3, 1894), spuriously nicknamed "Death to Flying Things", was an American infielder, league official, manager and umpire in the early days of baseball, playing both before and after baseball became a professional sport. In addition to playing and managing, he served as president of the National Association of Professional Base Ball Players from 1872 through 1875, the sport's first entirely professional league. His character and unquestioned honesty were highly regarded during a period in baseball history where the game's reputation was badly damaged by gamblers and rowdy behavior by players and fans. However, his bad temper and stubbornness were traits that created trouble for him at times during his career, and caused him to be disliked by many. His commonly reported nickname, "Death to Flying Things", stems from an error in the 1969 edition of The Baseball Encyclopedia.

== Early career ==
A native of Brooklyn, Ferguson played for two of New York's earliest semi-professional clubs in the late 1860s and early 1870s, the Atlantics and Mutuals. On June 14, 1870, Ferguson (who played catcher that game) for the Atlantics provided the hit that created the tying run and he later scored the winning run in a match against the famous Cincinnati Red Stockings, the first team that was composed entirely of professional players ending the Red Stockings' 81 consecutive game winning streak, and ushering in the first era of competitive professional sports. He is credited with being the first player to bat from both sides of home plate, known as switch-hitting, but the practice was not popular at first. Among the explanations for this, it is claimed that, due to his personality, players did not want to emulate him. Managers, however, recognized the practice's importance soon after, and began to play their players according to the opposing pitcher that day, known today as platooning, and the advantages that switch-hitting posed would later become accepted strategic baseball philosophy, and many players began to experiment with the idea.

== National Association ==
In 1871, Ferguson took over the Mutual team as the player-manager. In 33 games, he batted .241, while the team finished with a 16–17 record, which put them in fifth place at the season's end. As manager, Ferguson insisted upon implicit obedience from his men, but was forced to leave following the season due to heavy rumors of gambling surrounding the team. For the 1872 season, Ferguson re-joined his Atlantics team, which was now a member of the National Association as well, and he would stay there through the 1874 season. In 1872, he was elected by the players to be the president of the National Association, an office he held through the 1875 season, the last season of the Association.

On September 1, 1872, Ferguson arranged a benefit game for Al Thake, a 22-year-old left fielder for the Atlantics, who drowned during a fishing trip off Fort Hamilton, in New York Harbor. The old Brooklyn Atlantics and Members of the 1869 Cincinnati Red Stockings played against each other in the benefit game.

While serving as a substitute umpire during a game between the Baltimore Canaries and Mutuals on July 24, 1873, Ferguson received continuous, loud, verbal abuse from Mutuals catcher Nat Hicks. Ferguson and Hicks got into an altercation at the conclusion of the game, which Ferguson ended by hitting Hicks in the left arm with a bat, breaking his arm in two places. Ferguson required a police escort to leave the playing field, and Hicks refused to press charges and the two reconciled afterwards. During the final season of the Association, he played and managed the Hartford Dark Blues.

== National League ==
When the Association dissolved, his Hartford team was accepted into the National League for its inaugural season in 1876, and Ferguson became a League Director. As a league official, he was involved in a landmark decision that season. The case involved Jim Devlin, pitcher for the Louisville Grays. Devlin wanted to be released from his contract, claiming that Louisville had failed to fulfill the terms of his contract. Surrounding Devlin were rumors that he took money from gamblers to throw games, known in the day as "hippodroming". Ferguson, along with fellow league directors, ruled in favor of the Grays' vice-president Charles Chase, and Devlin was ordered to remain with the Grays. The following season, Devlin and three other teammates, SS/2B Bill Craver, OF George Hall and 3B Al Nichols would receive life suspensions for throwing games. Devlin attempted to gain reinstatement for a number of years, but this was never granted.

The Dark Blues had turned to Ferguson to play for and manage the team because of his reputation as the most authoritarian captain in the game. He was an honest and upstanding citizen in a time when not many ballplayers could say the same. However, he was also a domineering, dictatorial captain with a violent streak. Team discipline did improve in his first season, but his overbearing ways proved divisive, causing the team to bicker amongst themselves. Ferguson's temper would flare up often, even when the team was winning. The Chicago Tribune reported that if anyone on the Hartford nine committed an error, "Ferguson [would] swear until everything looks blue." He was particularly rough on second baseman Jack Burdock, who on more than one occasion heard his captain publicly threaten "to ram his fist down Burdock's throat." Some players tolerated his behavior; others, however, refused to comply. Shortstop Tom Carey and center fielder Jack Remsen did not hesitate to yell back, while Burdock and pitcher Candy Cummings, on the other hand, often sulked. The situation in Hartford came to a head after a tough loss to the Red Stockings, a game in which Ferguson had committed several errors. Hartford's main pitcher, Tommy Bond, suggested that Ferguson was "crooked". Ferguson denied the charge, and Bond quickly retracted his statement, claiming that he said it in anger. Bond then requested that he be able to leave the team because he could not play for Ferguson, a request that was granted by league president Morgan Bulkeley, a former owner of the Dark Blues.

Hartford finished third in both of its two seasons in the National League, and when the team folded, Ferguson became the new Chicago White Stockings player-manager. It would be his only season in Chicago. Al Spalding had hired Ferguson to captain his Chicago team because of his reputation, openly saying that he admired Ferguson's style and leadership that made the Hartford teams successful. Ferguson personally had his most successful season as a player that season, as he batted .351, which was third in the league, led the league in on-base percentage, tied for fourth in runs batted in, and ranked fourth in hits. Unfortunately, the White Stockings finished at .500, and in Spalding's memoirs he called Ferguson "tactless" and hopelessly lacking any knowledge "of the subtle science of handling men by strategy rather than by force." Cap Anson would eventually take over that role in 1879.

Ferguson again moved on, this time accepting the player-manager role with the new Troy Trojans team who began their time in the National League in 1879, and would stay in that role until the team folded after the 1882 season. In 1883, he became the first manager in the history of the Philadelphia Phillies franchise, which was known at the time as the Quakers, but was relieved of command when the team won only four of its first 17 games. On August 21 of that season, his Quakers traveled to Providence, Rhode Island to play the Grays. To increase ticket sales, he gave the day's pitching duty to Rhode Island native Art Hagan in hopes that Hagan's appearance would attract more locals to come watch the game. The strategy worked, but Hagen surrendered 28 runs and the Quakers made 20 errors behind him and did not score a run. Financially sound decision as it was, a bad decision for public relations as Ferguson was labeled a sadist for not relieving Hagen.

== American Association ==
Ferguson's last two managerial positions were in the American Association. He was player-manager for the Pittsburgh Alleghenys, who later became the Pittsburgh Pirates, in 1884 and later took over the managerial role for parts of two seasons with the New York Metropolitans. As manager in baseball for 933 games, his teams won 417 games and lost 516, for a winning percentage of .447, and never finished higher than the third-place finishes his Trojans achieved. The totals reflect his time in the National Association as well as the National League and American Association. Ferguson is just one of two 19th-century managers to have managed for sixteen seasons, but he holds the distinction of having the most seasons managed to neither win 1,000 games nor manage for 1,000.

== Umpiring career ==
Ferguson had, on numerous occasions during his playing and managerial career, served as a substitute umpire, but did not start doing it full-time until after his departure from Philadelphia. In 1888, he became a full-time professional umpire, working in the American Association, and later in the Players' League in 1890. By the end of the 1890 season he had passed Kick Kelly to take over the record for career games as an umpire with 650; John Gaffney surpassed his final total of 786 in 1893. Ferguson officially umpired 804 games if his National Association games are taken into account, and his career came to a close after the 1891 season. On his umpiring philosophy, he once stated "Umpiring always came as easy to me", he said, "as sleeping on a featherbed. Never change a decision, never stop to talk to a man. Make 'em play ball and keep their mouths shut, and never fear but the people will be on your side and you'll be called the king of umpires."

== Nickname ==
Ferguson's commonly reported nickname, "Death to Flying Things", often appears on lists of the greatest baseball nicknames. However, it was never his nickname during his playing career or even during his lifetime. The sobriquet was first given to him in the 1969 edition of The Baseball Encyclopedia, which mistakenly assigned Jack Chapman's nickname of "Death to Flying Things" to Ferguson. This, in turn, was not Chapman's nickname during his career either, as it was invented by sportswriter Alfred Spink in his 1910 history of baseball The National Game, nearly 35 years after Chapman's last professional game.

== Post-career ==
Ferguson died in Brooklyn of apoplexy at the age of 49. Initially buried in the Cemetery of the Evergreens in Brooklyn, he was later reinterred in Cypress Hills Cemetery, also in the borough of Brooklyn. Despite his career that was filled with incidents of turmoil between him and his players and other baseball people, his funeral, which was held at his home, was quickly crowded, as was the front stoop. Eventually, they had to turn people away.

== See also ==
- List of Major League Baseball player-managers
