= 1874 New York Mutuals season =

1874 New York Mutuals
- League: National Association of Professional Base Ball Players
- Ballpark: Union Grounds
- City: New York, New York
- Record: 42–23 (.646)
- League place: 2nd
- Owner: William Cammeyer
- Managers: Tom Carey, Dick Higham

The New York Mutuals baseball team finished second in the National Association in 1874.

== Regular season ==
=== Season standings ===
National Association	W	L	GB	Pct.
Boston Red Stockings	52	18	–	.743
New York Mutuals	42	23	7.5	.646
Philadelphia Athletics	33	22	11.5	.600
Philadelphia White Stockings	29	29	17.0	.500
Chicago White Stockings	28	31	18.5	.474
Brooklyn Atlantics	22	33	22.5	.400
Hartford Dark Blues	16	37	27.5	.302
Baltimore Canaries	9	38	31.5	.191

=== Record vs. opponents ===
1874 National Association Records Sources:
Team	BAL	BOS	BR	CHI	HAR	NY	PHA	PWS
Baltimore	—	1–9	1–3	1–9	2–3	1–8	2–2	1–4
Boston	9–1	—	6–4–1	7–3	9–1	5–5	8–2	8–2
Brooklyn	3–1	4–6–1	—	3–4	5–3	3–7	1–6	3–6
Chicago	9–1	3–7	4–3	—	4–1	1–9	4–3	3–7
Hartford	3–2	1–9	3–5	1–4	—	2–8	2–5	4–4
New York	8–1	5–5	7–3	9–1	8–2	—	4–6	1–5
Philadelphia Athletics	2–2	2–8	6–1	3–4	5–2	6–4	—	9–1
Philadelphia White Stockings	4–1	2–8	6–3	7–3	4–4	5–1	1–9	—

=== Roster ===
1874 New York Mutuals
Roster
Pitchers: Bobby Mathews	Catchers: Dick Higham; Infielders: Jack Burdock; Tom Carey; Candy Nelson; Tom Patterson; Joe Start	Outfielders: Doug Allison; Billy Geer; John Hatfield; Nealy Phelps; Jack Remsen; Orator Shafer	Manager: Tom Carey; Dick Higham

== Player stats ==
=== Batting ===
Note: G = Games played; AB = At bats; H = Hits; Avg. = Batting average; HR = Home runs; RBI = Runs batted in

Player	G	AB	H	Avg.	HR	RBI
Dick Higham	65	333	87	.261	1	38
Joe Start	63	306	96	.314	2	46
Candy Nelson	65	297	73	.246	0	31
Tom Carey	64	287	82	.286	1	38
Jack Burdock	61	273	75	.275	1	26
Jack Remsen	64	284	65	.229	2	38
Doug Allison	65	318	90	.283	0	28
John Hatfield	63	292	66	.226	0	29
Nealy Phelps	6	24	3	.125	0	2
Billy Geer	2	8	2	.250	0	1
Orator Shafer	1	5	1	.200	0	0
Tom Patterson	1	5	2	.400	0	2

=== Starting pitchers ===
Note: G = Games pitched; IP = Innings pitched; W = Wins; L = Losses; ERA = Earned run average; SO = Strikeouts

Player	G	IP	W	L	ERA	SO
Bobby Mathews	65	578.0	42	22	1.90	101

==== Relief pitchers ====
Note: G = Games pitched; W = Wins; L = Losses; SV = Saves; ERA = Earned run average; SO = Strikeouts

Player	G	W	L	SV	ERA	SO
John Hatfield	3	0	1	0	2.25	0
