= Denny Mack =

American baseball player (1850–1888)

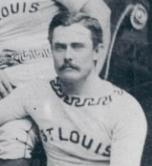
- First baseman / Shortstop
- Born: March 14, 1850; Mauch Chunk, Pennsylvania, U.S.
- Died: April 10, 1888 (aged 38); Wilkes-Barre, Pennsylvania, U.S.
- Batted: Right Threw: Right

Major league debut
- May 6, 1871, for the Rockford Forest Citys

Last major league appearance
- September 27, 1883, for the Pittsburgh Alleghenys

Major league statistics
- Games played: 373
- Runs scored: 309
- Batting average: .228
- Stats at Baseball Reference

Teams
- As player: Rockford Forest Citys (1871); Philadelphia Athletics (1872); Philadelphia White Stockings (1873–1874); St. Louis Brown Stockings (1876); Buffalo Bisons (1880); Louisville Eclipse (1882); Pittsburgh Alleghenys (1883); As manager: Louisville Eclipse (1882)

Dennis Joseph Mack (né McGee; March 14, 1850 – April 10, 1888) was an American professional baseball player who was a first baseman and shortstop in the major leagues (Note: Mack played the first four years of his major league career in the National Association—the status of the National Association as a major league has been a point of some disagreement among baseball historians.) for eight seasons between 1871 and 1883. He played for seven teams across three major leagues, including as a player-manager for the Louisville Eclipse in 1882.

== Career ==
Mack spent three years at Villanova University, then joined the Rockford Forest Citys of the National Association for the 1871 season. The National Association was the first fully professional baseball league, and Rockford compiled a 4–21 record in its 25 games, finishing ninth in the nine-team league before folding at the season's end. Mack appeared in all 25 of his team's games, leading the team with 34 runs scored, 8 walks, and 12 stolen bases.

Mack went on to play the next three seasons in the National Association. During the last of these, 1874, he was involved in accusations of game fixing. On August 20, umpire Billy McLean came forward with allegations that a game between Mack's Philadelphia Whites and the Chicago White Stockings had been thrown by the Philadelphia club. McLean claimed that Philadelphia's John Radcliffe had approached him with an offer of $175 in exchange for making calls favorable to the White Stockings. According to McLean, Radcliffe named four other players as complicit in the fix: Mack, Candy Cummings, Bill Craver, and Nat Hicks. The board of directors for the Whites met to consider these charges on September 1, and they elected not to pursue the matter further with any players but Radcliffe, describing McLean's claims as "hearsay". The stockholders of the club voted to expel Radcliffe on September 8, by a count of 26–15, but he appealed to the judiciary committee of the National Association, and was reinstated on March 2, due to what Henry Chadwick characterized as procedural errors during the course of his expulsion.

Mack then spent 1876 and 1880 in the National League, and concluded his major league career by spending two more seasons in the American Association in 1882 and 1883. During the 1882 season, he also served as manager of the Louisville Eclipse, leading the second-place club to a 42–38 record. He led the NA in walks in 1872, and ranked among his league's leaders in stolen bases three times. Mack ended his career with a .228 batting average, .273 on-base percentage, and .271 slugging percentage in 373 games played and 1505 at bats.

== Death ==
He suffered a fit on the evening of April 9, 1888, and remained unconscious until dying at 6 a.m. the next day.

== See also ==
- List of Major League Baseball player–managers
