= Johnny Ryan (baseball) =

American baseball player (1853–1902)

- Left fielder
- Born: October 1853; Philadelphia, Pennsylvania, U.S.
- Died: March 22, 1902 (aged 48); Philadelphia, Pennsylvania, U.S.
- Batted: Unknown Threw: Unknown

MLB debut
- August 19, 1873, for the Philadelphia White Stockings

Last MLB appearance
- July 12, 1877, for the Cincinnati Reds

MLB statistics
- Batting Average: .208
- Home Runs: 1
- RBI: 48
- Stats at Baseball Reference

Teams
- Philadelphia White Stockings (1873); Baltimore Canaries (1874); New Haven Elm Citys (1875); Louisville Grays (1876); Cincinnati Reds (1877)

John Joseph Ryan (October 1853 – March 22, 1902) was an American outfielder from 1873 to 1877 in the National Association and the National League. After retiring from baseball, Ryan joined the Philadelphia Police Department in March 1891, becoming a well-liked and respected officer. Ryan suffered a fatal heart attack and died while on duty, after being kicked in the stomach while trying to arrest Charles Hemple, who started a fight in a pub. Ryan was interred at New Cathedral Cemetery in Philadelphia.
