= John Donnelly (baseball) =

American baseball player (1850–1913)

- Infielder
- Born: November 15, 1850; Philadelphia, Pennsylvania, U.S.
- Died: December 24, 1913 (aged 63); Minneapolis, Minnesota, U.S.
- Batted: Unknown Threw: Unknown

MLB debut
- April 14, 1873, for the Washington Blue Legs

Last MLB appearance
- October 30, 1874, for the Philadelphia Whites

MLB statistics
- Batting average: .252
- Home runs: 0
- Runs batted in: 21
- Stats at Baseball Reference

Teams
- Washington Blue Legs (1873); Philadelphia Whites (1874)

John Louis Donnelly (November 15, 1850 – December 24, 1913) was an American infielder in professional baseball. He played in the National Association for the 1873 Washington Blue Legs and 1874 Philadelphia Whites.
