= Frank McKenna (disambiguation) =

Frank McKenna (born 1948) is a Canadian businessman, diplomat and politician.

Frank McKenna may also refer to:

- Frank McKenna (baseball) (fl. 1874), Philadelphia White Stockings player
- Frank McKenna (English footballer) (1902–1947), English footballer (Grimsby Town, Fulham FC, Norwich City, Newport County)
- Frank McKenna (Scottish footballer) (fl. 1920–1929), Scottish footballer who played in the American Soccer League
- Frank McKenna (RAF officer) (1906–1994), British Royal Air Force service police detective
- Frank McKenna (River City), fictional character
