= Henry Kohler =

American baseball player (1852–1934)

Henry C. Kohler
- Infielder
- Born: May 5, 1852; Baltimore, Maryland, U.S.
- Died: August 27, 1934 (aged 82); Baltimore, Maryland, U.S.
- Batted: Unknown Threw: Unknown

MLB debut
- July 21, 1871, for the Fort Wayne Kekiongas

Last MLB appearance
- September 9, 1874, for the Baltimore Canaries

MLB statistics
- At bats: 92
- RBIs: 1
- Home runs: 0
- Batting average: .110
- Stats at Baseball Reference

Teams
- Fort Wayne Kekiongas 1871; Baltimore Marylands 1873; Baltimore Canaries 1874

Henry C. Kohler (May 5, 1852 – August 27, 1934) was an American professional baseball player, who played 41 games during the 1871, 1873 and 1874 seasons. He was born in Baltimore, Maryland and died there at the age of 82, and was interred at Loudon Park Cemetery.
