= Fancy O'Neil =

American baseball player (1853–1917)

- Right fielder
- Born: 1853; Hartford, Connecticut
- Died: October 23, 1917 (aged 63–64); Hartford, Connecticut
- Batted: Unknown Threw: Unknown

MLB debut
- October 23, 1874, for the Hartford Dark Blues

Last MLB appearance
- October 23, 1874, for the Hartford Dark Blues

MLB statistics
- Games played: 1
- At bats: 3
- Batting average: .000
- Stats at Baseball Reference

Teams
- Hartford Dark Blues (1874)

Michael "Fancy" O'Neil (1853 – October 10, 1917) was an American professional baseball player whose career in the National Association consisted of one game for the 1874 Hartford Dark Blues. The game took place on October 23, 1874, when he played all nine innings in right field in a 13–1 loss to the Boston Red Stockings. Peter Morris, a member of SABR, claims that O'Neil's nickname of "Fancy" is from his time as a boxer, as well as that he was born in Ireland to parents Michael and Sarah. He grew up in New York City and Hartford, Connecticut.
