= Jim Hall (baseball) =

American baseball player

- Second baseman
- Died: January 30, 1886; Brooklyn, New York, U.S.
- Batted: Unknown Threw: Unknown

MLB debut
- May 20, 1872, for the Brooklyn Atlantics

Last MLB appearance
- May 15, 1874, for the Brooklyn Atlantics

MLB statistics
- Batting average: .288
- Runs scored: 9
- RBIs: 6
- Stats at Baseball Reference

Teams
- Brooklyn Atlantics (1872,1874)

James Hall (died January 30, 1886) was a professional baseball player who played second base for the Brooklyn Atlantics (1872, 1874) of the NAPBBP.
