= Charlie Snow =

American baseball player (1849–1929)

- Catcher
- Born: August 3, 1849; Lowell, Massachusetts, U.S.
- Died: August 27, 1929 (aged 80); Brooklyn, New York, U.S.
- Batted: Unknown Threw: Unknown

MLB debut
- October 1, 1874, for the Brooklyn Atlantics

Last MLB appearance
- October 1, 1874, for the Brooklyn Atlantics

MLB statistics
- Games played: 1
- Runs scored: 0
- Hits: 1
- Batting average: 1.000
- Stats at Baseball Reference

Teams
- Brooklyn Atlantics (1874)

Charles M. Snow (August 3, 1849 – August 27, 1929) was an American professional baseball player who played catcher for the 1874 Brooklyn Atlantics.
