= Frederick Boardman =

American baseball player (1851–1941)

- Right fielder
- Born: February 18, 1851; St. Joseph, Missouri, U.S.
- Died: April 12, 1941 (aged 90); Indianapolis, Indiana, U.S.
- Batted: Unknown Threw: Unknown

MLB debut
- August 29, 1874, for the Baltimore Canaries

Last MLB appearance
- August 29, 1874, for the Baltimore Canaries

MLB statistics
- Batting Average: .250
- Home Runs: 0
- RBI: 0
- Stats at Baseball Reference

Teams
- Baltimore Canaries (1874)

Frederick Stanley Boardman (February 18, 1851 – April 12, 1941) was an American baseball player. Boardman was born in 1851 in St. Joseph, Missouri. According to baseball historian David Nemec, he was an "auxiliary player" in Chicago for many years. He appeared in one game in Major League Baseball as a right fielder for the Baltimore Canaries in the National Association during the 1874 baseball season. His lone appearance with the Canaries came about when the team visited Chicago and was in need of an outfielder. The Chicago White Stockings won the game by a 4–0 score. During the 1875 season, he worked as an umpire in the National Association. He died in 1941 in Indianapolis, at age 90. At the time of his death he had been the last living player from the 1874 season.
