= Tom Miller (catcher) =

American baseball player (1850–1876)

- Catcher
- Born: c. 1850; Philadelphia, Pennsylvania
- Died: May 29, 1876 (aged 25–26); Philadelphia, Pennsylvania
- Batted: Unknown Threw: Unknown

MLB debut
- October 24, 1874, for the Philadelphia Athletics

Last MLB appearance
- October 29, 1875, for the St. Louis Brown Stockings

MLB statistics
- Games played: 60
- At bats: 230
- Batting average: .187
- Stats at Baseball Reference

Teams
- Philadelphia Athletics (1874); St. Louis Brown Stockings (1875)

Thomas P. Miller (c. 1850 – May 29, 1876), nicknamed "Reddy", was an American Major League Baseball catcher who played a total of 59 games during his two-season career. He played four games for the 1874 Philadelphia Athletics, and 56 games for the 1875 St. Louis Brown Stockings, both of the NAPBBP. His career statistical totals include: 230 at bats, 19 runs scored, two doubles, and a .187 batting average.

== Biography ==
Miller was born in Philadelphia, Pennsylvania.

He died in Philadelphia on May 29, 1876, a week after he played in an exhibition game and appeared to be in good health. His death was attributed to various illnesses by various sources, including kidney disease, bowel inflammation, and malaria. He is interred at Evergreen Memorial Park in Bensalem Township, Pennsylvania, after having been moved from Lafayette Cemetery in Philadelphia.

== See also ==
- List of baseball players who died during their careers
