= Warren White (baseball) =

American baseball player (1844–1890)

- Third baseman / Manager
- Born: c. 1844; Milton, New York, U.S.
- Died: June 12, 1890; Little Rock, Arkansas, U.S.
- Batted: Unknown Threw: Unknown

Major-league debut
- June 17, 1871, for the Washington Olympics

Last major-league appearance
- June 27, 1884, for the Washington Nationals

Major-league statistics
- Batting average: .254
- Runs: 96
- Runs Batted In: 64
- Stats at Baseball Reference

Teams
- As player: Washington Olympics (1871); Washington Nationals (1872); Washington Blue Legs (1873); Baltimore Canaries (1874); Chicago White Stockings (1875); Washington Nationals (1884); As manager: Washington Nationals (1872); Baltimore Canaries (1874)

William Warren White (c. 1844 – June 12, 1890) was an American professional baseball player and manager who played mainly third base for six different teams in his six seasons of professional baseball, five of which were in the National Association and one in the Union Association.

== Early life ==
Born in Milton, New York, he also played under the name William Warren. Before he played professional baseball, Warren served in the Civil War from 1861 to 1865 as part of the 14th Heavy Artillery Regiment New York. He joined the Union Army, and began working as a clerk for the Paymaster General in Washington, D.C.

== Career ==
He was a player-manager for the Baltimore Canaries during the 1874 season, finishing in 8th place with a 9-38 record. The team would fold after the season, and Warren would never manage in the majors again.

In 1884, White was elected and served as the Secretary of the Union Association, while also serving as the delegate from the Washington Nationals. He also played in four games for Washington, gathering just one hit in 18 at bats. After the season, he was re-elected as Secretary of the Association, but the league folded before the 1885 season.

== Post-career ==
White was listed as having various clerk jobs for the federal government after his playing career. He died in Little Rock, Arkansas at the age of 46 and was buried in Ballston Spa Village Cemetery in Ballston Spa, New York.
