= Tom York (baseball) =

American baseball player (1850–1936)

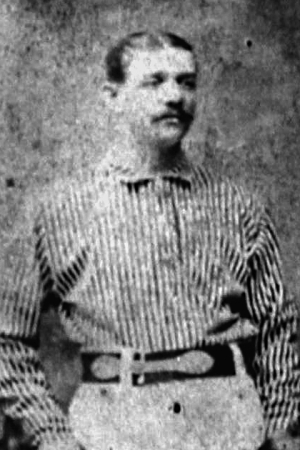
- Left fielder
- Born: July 13, 1850; Brooklyn, New York, U.S.
- Died: February 17, 1936 (aged 85); New York City, New York, U.S.
- Batted: Left Threw: Left

MLB debut
- May 9, 1871, for the Troy Haymakers

Last MLB appearance
- June 20, 1885, for the Baltimore Orioles

MLB statistics
- Batting average: .273
- Hits: 1,095
- Runs: 743
- Stats at Baseball Reference

Teams
- National Association of Base Ball Players Powhatan of Brooklyn (1869) Troy Haymakers (1870) League Player Troy Haymakers (1871) Baltimore Canaries (1872–1873) Philadelphia White Stockings (1874) Hartford Dark Blues (1875–1877) Providence Grays (1878–1882) Cleveland Blues (1883) Baltimore Orioles (1884–1885)

Thomas Jefferson York (July 13, 1850 – February 17, 1936) was an American professional baseball left fielder. Over the course of York's 15-season career as a professional, which spanned the National Association and Major League Baseball, he racked up 1095 hits in 4005 at bats, for a .273 batting average. Twice, during his playing time with the Providence Grays, he was also manager including the entire first season of the team's existence in 1878.

York began his playing career in the amateur National Association of Base Ball Players with the Powhatan club in Brooklyn in 1869. In 1871, he became a member of the Troy Haymakers, one of the founding clubs of the National Association. He was playing for the Hartford Dark Blues when they joined the new National League in 1876.

In 1878, after the Hartfords folded, York joined the Providence Grays as player-manager. That season, he led the National League in total bases, extra-base hits, and triples. He was a member of the National League champion Grays team of 1879, and remained with the team until 1882. In 1883, now a member of the Cleveland Blues he led the league in walks. After one season with the Blues, he was purchased by the Baltimore Orioles of the American Association. He played two seasons for Baltimore to finish out his major league career.

Tom died at the age of 86 in New York City, and was buried in Holy Cross Cemetery, which is in Brooklyn.

== See also ==
- List of Major League Baseball annual triples leaders
- List of Major League Baseball player-managers
