= Tom McGovern (baseball) =

American baseball player (1852–1919)

- Second Baseman
- Born: November 1852; Newark, New Jersey
- Died: July 5, 1919 (aged 66); Newark, New Jersey
- Batted: Unknown Threw: Unknown

MLB debut
- June 15, 1874, for the Brooklyn Atlantics

Last MLB appearance
- June 15, 1874, for the Brooklyn Atlantics

MLB statistics
- Batting average: .000
- Runs: 1
- Runs batted in: 0
- Stats at Baseball Reference

Teams
- Brooklyn Atlantics (1874)

Thomas J. McGovern (November 1852 – July 5, 1919) was an American professional baseball second baseman who played in one major league game for the Brooklyn Atlantics in 1874. In the game, which took place on June 15, he had no hits in four at bats, but scored a run. In the field, McGovern had twelve chances and made three errors. He played for Essex, a minor league club in Newark, New Jersey, in 1874 as well, and continued playing through 1876. He appeared in an old-timers game in 1897 and died in Newark on July 5, 1919.

For a long time, McGovern had no known first name, and his last was thought to be "Gavern", despite contemporary box scores listing his surname correctly. In 2024, the Society for American Baseball Research discovered McGovern's first name and other biographical information about him.
