= John Carl =

American baseball player (1854–1927)

- Catcher
- Born: May 28, 1854; Baltimore, Maryland
- Died: October 2, 1927 (aged 73); Baltimore, Maryland
- Batted: Unknown Threw: Unknown

MLB debut
- September 9, 1874, for the Baltimore Canaries

Last MLB appearance
- September 9, 1874, for the Baltimore Canaries

MLB statistics
- Batting Average: .000
- Home Runs: 0
- RBI: 0
- Stats at Baseball Reference

Teams
- Baltimore Canaries (1874)

John Carl (May 28, 1854 – October 2, 1927) was an American baseball player.

Carl played in one game for the 1874 Baltimore Canaries of the National Association. He was 0-for-3 that day, and the Canaries lost to the New York Mutuals, 15-1, en route to 9-38 season, after which they folded.

Three years later, in 1877, Carl appeared in eight games for the Manchester, New Hampshire based, Manchester club of the International Association, a quasi-major league that featured many players that would later play in the real big leagues, including John O'Rourke, brother of "Orator" Jim O'Rourke. He managed three hits in 27 at bats for a .111 average.

John Carl died on October 2, 1927, in Baltimore, Maryland, at the age of 73.
