= Jack Farrell (outfielder) =

American baseball player (1856–1916)

- Outfielder
- Born: January 2, 1856; Hartford, Connecticut
- Died: November 15, 1916 (aged 60); Hartford, Connecticut

MLB debut
- October 27, 1874, for the Hartford Dark Blues

Last MLB appearance
- October 30, 1874, for the Hartford Dark Blues

MLB statistics
- Batting average: .385
- Runs scored: 3
- Runs batted in: 0
- Stats at Baseball Reference

Teams
- Hartford Dark Blues (1874)

John "Hartford Jack" Farrell (January 2, 1856 – November 15, 1916) was an outfielder in Major League Baseball in the 19th century.
