= Newington Park =

Baseball grounds in Baltimore, Maryland

- Interactive map of Newington Park
- Coordinates: 39°18′26″N 76°38′27″W
- Surface: grass

Tenants
- Baltimore Orioles (AA) (1882); Baltimore Canaries (NAPBBP) (1872–1874)

Newington Park was a baseball grounds in Baltimore, Maryland. It was home to the Lord Baltimore baseball club of the National Association from 1872 to 1874 and to the Baltimore Orioles of the American Association for the 1882 season. There are apparently no surviving photographs of the grounds. Its location was on Pennsylvania Avenue "extended," on the northwest side of West Baltimore (Baker Street, North Calhoun Street, Gold Street and Pennsylvania Avenue).

The ballpark was built around a development and eventually was replaced by homes and tin factory which is now Ames Memorial United Methodist.
