= Bill Smiley =

American baseball player (1856–1884)

- Second baseman
- Born: 1856; Baltimore, Maryland, U.S.
- Died: July 11, 1884 (aged 27–28); Baltimore, Maryland, U.S.
- Batted: Unknown Threw: Unknown

MLB debut
- October 13, 1874, for the Baltimore Canaries

Last MLB appearance
- September 30, 1882, for the Baltimore Orioles

MLB statistics
- Batting average: .195
- Home runs: 0
- Runs batted in: 0
- Stats at Baseball Reference

Teams
- Baltimore Canaries (1874); St. Louis Brown Stockings (1882); Baltimore Orioles (1882)

William B. Smiley (1856 – July 11, 1884) was an American professional baseball player who primarily played second base in the American Association for the St. Louis Brown Stockings and the Baltimore Orioles for one season in 1882.

In July 1884, Smiley was playing for the minor league club in Richmond, Virginia when he returned to Baltimore "in a sickly condition." He died about a week later on July 11, 1884 at his mother's home on Aisquith Street of "rheumatism in the region of the heart."
