= Levin Jones =

American baseball player (1847–1914)

- Outfielder/Catcher
- Born: July 4, 1847; Baltimore, Maryland
- Died: September 20, 1914 (aged 67); Baltimore, Maryland
- Batted: Unknown Threw: Unknown

MLB debut
- May 14, 1873, for the Baltimore Marylands

Last MLB appearance
- October 14, 1874, for the Baltimore Canaries

MLB statistics
- Games played: 3
- Hits: 4
- Batting average: .364
- Stats at Baseball Reference

Teams
- Baltimore Marylands (1873); Baltimore Canaries (1874)

Levin Thomas Jones (July 4, 1847 – September 20, 1914) was a professional baseball player during the mid-1870s who played parts of two seasons in the National Association of Professional Base Ball Players. Jones played in a single game for the Baltimore Marylands on May 14, 1873, and collected three hits in four at bats, for a .750 batting average, and had one run batted in, while playing in center field. In 1874, he played in two games for the Baltimore Canaries, one game as their right fielder, and one as their catcher. In seven at bats, he collected one hit, for a .143 batting average, and had one run batted in. He did not appear in another game in the top professional leagues after this season.
