= Mike Ledwith =

American baseball player (1851–1914)

- Catcher
- Born: 1851; Brooklyn, New York, U.S.
- Died: March 17, 1914 (aged 62–63); Troy, New York, U.S.
- Batted: Unknown Threw: Unknown

MLB debut
- August 19, 1874, for the Brooklyn Atlantics

Last MLB appearance
- August 19, 1874, for the Brooklyn Atlantics

MLB statistics
- Games played: 1
- Runs scored: 1
- Hits: 1
- Batting average: .250
- Stats at Baseball Reference

Teams
- Brooklyn Atlantics (1874)

Michael Ledwith (1851 – March 17, 1914) was an American professional baseball player who played catcher in one game for the 1874 Brooklyn Atlantics.
