= 1874 Philadelphia Athletics season =

1874 Philadelphia Athletics
- League: National Association of Professional Base Ball Players
- Ballpark: Jefferson Street Grounds
- City: Philadelphia, Pennsylvania
- Record: 33–22 (.600)
- League place: 3rd
- Manager: Dick McBride

The 1874 Philadelphia Athletics finished in third place in the National Association with a record of 33–22. Dick McBride pitched all of the team's innings and led the league with a 1.64 earned run average.

== Regular season ==
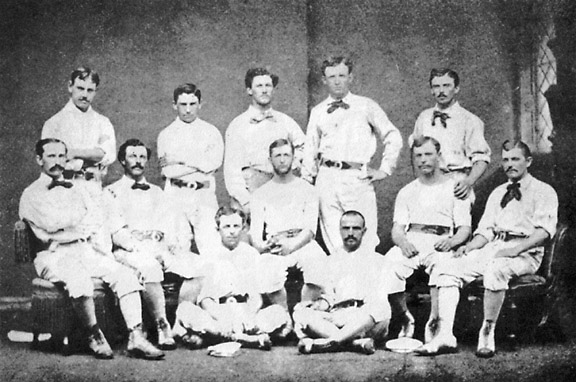
1874 Philadelphia Athletics

On July 15, 1874, six thousand fans filled twenty-fifth and Jefferson's two pavilions and stands down the left and right field lines to see Athletic, behind the pitching of Al Spalding defeat Boston.

=== Season standings ===
National Association	W	L	T	Pct.	GB
Boston Red Stockings	52	18	1	.739	—
New York Mutuals	42	23	—	.646	7½
Philadelphia Athletics	33	22	—	.600	11½
Philadelphia White Stockings	29	29	—	.500	17
Chicago White Stockings	28	31	—	.475	18½
Brooklyn Atlantics	22	33	1	.402	22½
Hartford Dark Blues	16	37	—	.302	27½
Baltimore Canaries	9	38	—	.191	31½

=== Record vs. opponents ===
1874 National Association Records Sources:
Team	BAL	BOS	BR	CHI	HAR	NY	PHA	PWS
Baltimore	—	1–9	1–3	1–9	2–3	1–8	2–2	1–4
Boston	9–1	—	6–4–1	7–3	9–1	5–5	8–2	8–2
Brooklyn	3–1	4–6–1	—	3–4	5–3	3–7	1–6	3–6
Chicago	9–1	3–7	4–3	—	4–1	1–9	4–3	3–7
Hartford	3–2	1–9	3–5	1–4	—	2–8	2–5	4–4
New York	8–1	5–5	7–3	9–1	8–2	—	4–6	1–5
Philadelphia Athletics	2–2	2–8	6–1	3–4	5–2	6–4	—	9–1
Philadelphia White Stockings	4–1	2–8	6–3	7–3	4–4	5–1	1–9	—

=== Roster ===
1874 Philadelphia Athletics
Roster
Pitchers: Dick McBride	Catchers: John Clapp; Tom Miller; Infielders: Cap Anson; Joe Battin; Wes Fisler; Mike McGeary; Ezra Sutton	Outfielders: Count Gedney; John McMullin; Tim Murnane; Al Reach; Count Sensenderfer	Manager: Dick McBride

== Player stats ==
=== Batting ===
==== Starters by position ====
Note: Pos = Position; G = Games played; AB = At bats; H = Hits; Avg. = Batting average; HR = Home runs; RBI = Runs batted in

Pos	Player	G	AB	H	Avg.	HR	RBI
C	John Clapp	39	165	48	.291	3	19
1B	Wes Fisler	37	180	59	.328	0	22
2B	Joe Battin	51	226	52	.230	0	27
SS	Mike McGeary	54	271	87	.321	0	22
3B	Ezra Sutton	55	243	71	.292	0	28
OF	Cap Anson	55	260	87	.335	0	37
OF	Count Gedney	54	222	61	.275	1	34
OF	John McMullin	55	260	90	.346	2	32

==== Other batters ====
Note: G = Games played; AB = At bats; H = Hits; Avg. = Batting average; HR = Home runs; RBI = Runs batted in

Player	G	AB	H	Avg.	HR	RBI
Tim Murnane	21	82	17	.207	0	11
Al Reach	14	55	7	.127	0	2
Count Sensenderfer	5	16	3	.188	0	2
Tom Miller	4	16	8	.500	0	5

=== Pitching ===
==== Starting pitchers ====
Note: G = Games pitched; IP = Innings pitched; W = Wins; L = Losses; ERA = Earned run average; SO = Strikeouts

Player	G	IP	W	L	ERA	SO
Dick McBride	55	487.0	33	22	1.64	37
