= 1874 Boston Red Stockings season =

1874 Boston Red Stockings
- National Association Champions
- League: National Association of Professional Base Ball Players
- Ballpark: South End Grounds
- City: Boston, Massachusetts
- Record: 52–18 (.743)
- League place: 1st
- Owner: Charles H. Porter
- Manager: Harry Wright

The 1874 Boston Red Stockings season was the fourth season of the franchise. They won their third consecutive National Association championship.

Managed by Harry Wright, Boston finished with a record of 52–18 to win the pennant by 7.5 games. Pitcher Al Spalding started 69 of the Red Stockings' games and led the NA with 52 wins. Outfielder Cal McVey led the league with 71 runs batted in, and he paced the Boston offense which scored more runs than any other team.

Harry Wright, Al Spalding, first baseman Jim O'Rourke, catcher Deacon White, and shortstop George Wright have all been elected into the Baseball Hall of Fame.

== Regular season ==
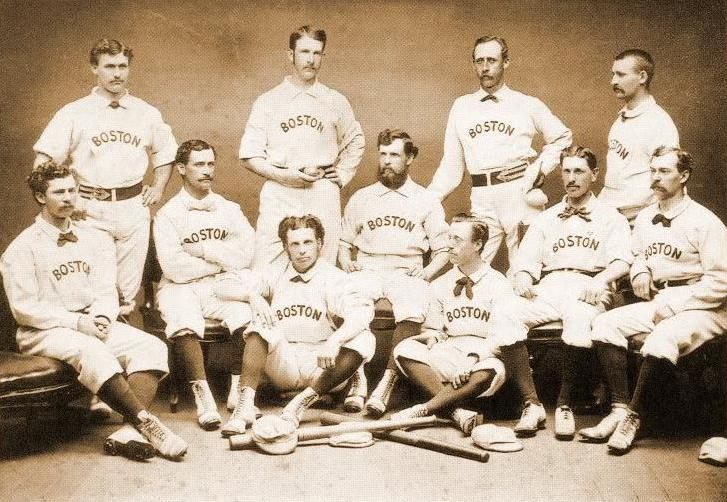
Team photograph

=== Season standings ===
National Association	W	L	T	Pct.	GB
Boston Red Stockings	52	18	1	.739	—
New York Mutuals	42	23	—	.646	7½
Philadelphia Athletics	33	22	—	.600	11½
Philadelphia White Stockings	29	29	—	.500	17
Chicago White Stockings	28	31	—	.475	18½
Brooklyn Atlantics	22	33	1	.402	22½
Hartford Dark Blues	16	37	—	.302	27½
Baltimore Canaries	9	38	—	.191	31½

=== Record vs. opponents ===
1874 National Association Records Sources:
Team	BAL	BOS	BR	CHI	HAR	NY	PHA	PWS
Baltimore	—	1–9	1–3	1–9	2–3	1–8	2–2	1–4
Boston	9–1	—	6–4–1	7–3	9–1	5–5	8–2	8–2
Brooklyn	3–1	4–6–1	—	3–4	5–3	3–7	1–6	3–6
Chicago	9–1	3–7	4–3	—	4–1	1–9	4–3	3–7
Hartford	3–2	1–9	3–5	1–4	—	2–8	2–5	4–4
New York	8–1	5–5	7–3	9–1	8–2	—	4–6	1–5
Philadelphia Athletics	2–2	2–8	6–1	3–4	5–2	6–4	—	9–1
Philadelphia White Stockings	4–1	2–8	6–3	7–3	4–4	5–1	1–9	—

=== Roster ===
1874 Boston Red Stockings
Roster
Pitchers: Al Spalding; Harry Wright; Catchers: Deacon White	Infielders: Ross Barnes; Tommy Beals; Jim O'Rourke; Harry Schafer; George Wright	Outfielders: George Hall; Andy Leonard; Cal McVey; Harry Wright	Manager: Harry Wright

== Player stats ==
=== Batting ===
==== Starters by position ====
Note: Pos = Position; G = Games played; AB = At bats; H = Hits; Avg. = Batting average; HR = Home runs; RBI = Runs batted in

Pos	Player	G	AB	H	Avg.	HR	RBI
C	Deacon White	70	352	106	.301	3	52
1B	Jim O'Rourke	70	331	104	.314	5	61
2B	Ross Barnes	51	259	88	.340	0	39
SS	George Wright	60	313	103	.329	2	44
3B	Harry Schafer	71	327	87	.266	1	45
OF	George Hall	47	222	64	.288	1	34
OF	Cal McVey	70	343	123	.359	3	71
OF	Andy Leonard	71	339	106	.313	0	50

==== Other batters ====
Note: G = Games played; AB = At bats; H = Hits; Avg. = Batting average; HR = Home runs; RBI = Runs batted in

Player	G	AB	H	Avg.	HR	RBI
Harry Wright	40	184	58	.315	2	27
Tommy Beals	19	97	19	.196	0	17

=== Pitching ===
==== Starting pitchers ====
Note: G = Games pitched; IP = Innings pitched; W = Wins; L = Losses; ERA = Earned run average; SO = Strikeouts

Player	G	IP	W	L	ERA	SO
Al Spalding	71	617.1	52	16	1.92	31

==== Relief pitchers ====
Note: G = Games pitched; IP = Innings pitched; W = Wins; L = Losses; ERA = Earned run average; SO = Strikeouts

Player	G	IP	W	L	ERA	SO
Harry Wright	6	16.2	0	2	2.16	0

Preceded by Boston Red Stockings; 1873	National Association of Professional Base Ball Players Championship Season; 1874	Succeeded by Boston Red Stockings; 1875
