= Robert Brown (baseball) =

American baseball player

- Shortstop
- Batted: Unknown Threw: Unknown

MLB debut
- July 29, 1874, for the Baltimore Canaries

Last MLB appearance
- August 31, 1874, for the Baltimore Canaries

MLB statistics
- At-bats: 9
- Errors: 3
- Putouts: 3
- Stats at Baseball Reference

Teams
- Baltimore Canaries (1874)

Robert Brown was an American shortstop in the National Association for the 1874 Baltimore Canaries. In 9 at-bats, Brown compiled no hits. Brown played his 2 career games at the shortstop position and committed 3 errors in 11 total chances.
