= Jim Tipper =

American baseball player (1849–1895)

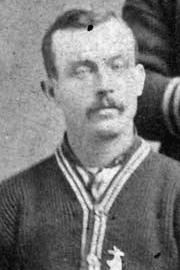
- Outfielder
- Born: June 18, 1849; Middletown, Connecticut, U.S.
- Died: April 21, 1895 (aged 45); New Haven, Connecticut, U.S.
- Batted: Unknown Threw: Unknown

MLB debut
- April 26, 1872, for the Middletown Mansfields

Last MLB appearance
- August 6, 1875, for the New Haven Elm Citys

MLB statistics
- Games played: 110
- Batting average: .245
- Hits: 114
- Stats at Baseball Reference

Teams
- National Association of Base Ball Players Middletown Mansfields (1869–1870) National Association of Professional BBP Middletown Mansfields (1872) Hartford Dark Blues (1874) New Haven Elm Citys (1875)

James Tipper (June 18, 1849 – April 21, 1895) was an American professional baseball player who played as an outfielder during his three-year career in the National Association. He played for three teams during his career, all based in the state of Connecticut: his hometown Middletown Mansfields in 1872, the Hartford Dark Blues in 1874, and the New Haven Elm Citys in 1875. He later played in several minor league seasons; a Live Oaks team in Lynn, Massachusetts, a season for the Syracuse Stars in 1876, two seasons for the Rochester, New York team of the International Association, and one for the Manchester, New Hampshire team of the National Association. Tipper died in New Haven, Connecticut at the age of 45 of consumption (tuberculosis).
