= John Farrow (baseball) =

American baseball player (1853–1914)

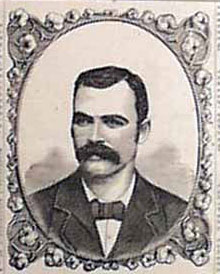
- Catcher
- Born: November 8, 1853; Verplanck, New York, US
- Died: December 31, 1914 (aged 61); Perth Amboy, New Jersey, US
- Batted: Left Threw: Right

MLB debut
- April 28, 1873, for the Elizabeth Resolutes

Last MLB appearance
- June 14, 1884, for the Brooklyn Atlantics

MLB statistics
- Batting average: .197
- Home runs: 0
- RBIs: 13
- Stats at Baseball Reference

Teams
- Elizabeth Resolutes (1873); Brooklyn Atlantics (1874); Brooklyn Atlantics (1884)

John Jacob Farrow (November 8, 1853 – December 31, 1914), also known as Jack, was an American Major League Baseball player who played catcher in two seasons in the National Association of Professional Base Ball Players, and one season in the majors, with the 1884 Brooklyn Atlantics. Farrow died in Perth Amboy, New Jersey at the age of 61, and is interred at Holy Sepulchre Cemetery in East Orange, New Jersey.
