= Frank Sellman =

American baseball player (1851–1907)

- Catcher / Third baseman
- Born: January 21, 1851; Baltimore, Maryland, U.S.
- Died: May 6, 1907 (aged 56); Baltimore, Maryland, U.S.
- Batted: Unknown Threw: Unknown

Major-league debut
- May 4, 1871, for the Fort Wayne Kekiongas

Last major-league appearance
- May 3, 1875, for the Washington Nationals

Major-league statistics
- Batting average: .257
- Home runs: 1
- Runs batted in: 18
- Stats at Baseball Reference

Teams
- National Association of Base Ball Players: Baltimore Marylands (1869); National Association of Professional BBP: Fort Wayne Kekiongas (1871); Washington Olympics (1872); Baltimore Marylands (1873); Baltimore Canaries (1874); Washington Nationals (1875)

Charles Francis Sellman (January 21, 1851 – May 6, 1907) was an American professional baseball player. He played catcher, third base, and other positions for five different teams during the five seasons of the National Association (NA), 1871 to 1875.

== Early life ==
Charles Francis Sellman was born on January 21, 1851, in Baltimore.

== Baseball career ==
In 1869, Sellman participated in the first professional pennant race for the Maryland club of Baltimore. He was the regular shortstop, played in 19 of 27 games on record, and scored 42 runs, a little below the team average rate. Sellman was a Baltimore native like most of his teammates. He returned to that club for one game in 1873, its only season in the professional Association.

The Kekionga club of Fort Wayne, Indiana hired several Baltimore natives in order to compete in the first professional league, the 1871 NA. Sellman was one. It was his only league season as a regular player. As a substitute during the league's remaining four seasons, he played for two teams based in Baltimore and two based in Washington, D.C.

It seems plausible that Sellman's ability to play the catcher position was crucial to his career, but he proved to be a capable batter in 1874, his last season with significant playing time. In 12 of 47 games, six as catcher, he scored 9 runs on 16 hits. Only one regular player scored or hit safely at higher rates. (On the other hand, Sellman's occasional action may have been against weaker than average opposition.)

Sellman played one game early in the 1875 season and never appeared in the National League that succeeded the NA the following year.

== Personal life ==
Sellman died on May 6, 1907, in Baltimore. He was buried in Green Mount Cemetery.
