= Henry Reville =

American baseball player

- Right fielder
- Born: Baltimore, Maryland, U.S.
- Batted: Unknown Threw: Unknown

MLB debut
- October 14, 1874, for the Baltimore Canaries

Last MLB appearance
- October 14, 1874, for the Baltimore Canaries

MLB statistics
- Batting Average: .000
- Home Runs: 0
- RBI: 0
- Stats at Baseball Reference

Teams
- Baltimore Canaries (1874)

Henry Reville was an American outfielder in the National Association, who played in one game for the 1874 Baltimore Canaries.
