= Zachary Taylor (baseball) =

American baseball player (1850–1917)

- First baseman
- Born: February 21, 1850; Baltimore, Maryland
- Died: November 21, 1917 (aged 67); Baltimore, Maryland
- Batted: Unknown Threw: Unknown

MLB debut
- September 10, 1874, for the Baltimore Canaries

Last MLB appearance
- October 14, 1874, for the Baltimore Canaries

MLB statistics
- Batting average: .250
- Home runs: 0
- RBI: 3
- Stats at Baseball Reference

Teams
- Baltimore Canaries (1874)

Zachary Hamner Taylor (1850-1917) was an American first baseman in the National Association for the 1874 Baltimore Canaries. Previously he was the captain of the amateur "Peabody Baseball Club" for a decade.
