= Henry Gilroy (baseball) =

American baseball player (1852–1907)

- Catcher
- Born: 1852; Smyrna, Delaware
- Died: October 31, 1907 (aged 54–55); Philadelphia, Pennsylvania
- Batted: Unknown Threw: Unknown

debut
- September 7, 1874, for the Chicago White Stockings

Last appearance
- September 3, 1875, for the Philadelphia Athletics

Career statistics
- Games played: 10
- Batting average: .205
- Runs batted in: 7
- Stats at Baseball Reference

Teams
- Chicago White Stockings (1874); Philadelphia Athletics (1875)

Henry Engard Gilroy (1852 – October 31, 1907) was an American professional baseball catcher. He played in Major League Baseball (MLB) for the Chicago White Stockings in 1874 and the Philadelphia Athletics in 1875.

Gilroy played in 10 games, eight with Chicago and two with Philadelphia.
