= John Radcliff =

American baseball player (1848–1911)

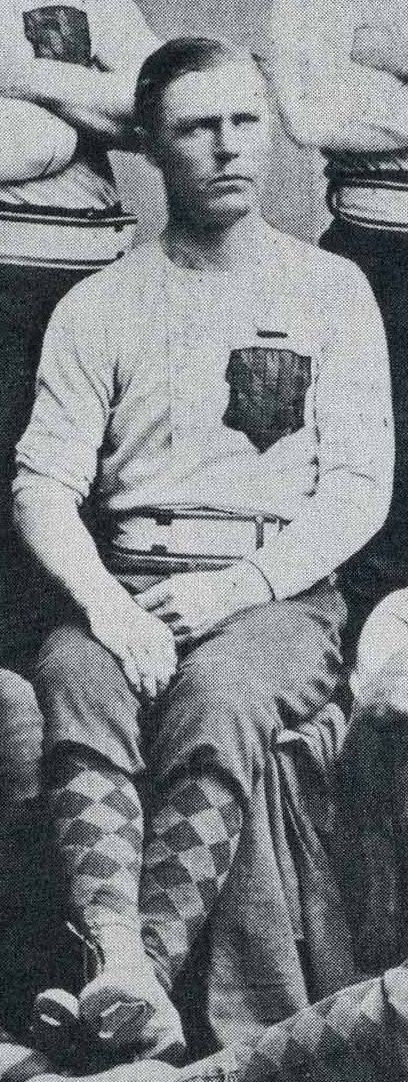
- Radcliff in 1872
- Shortstop
- Born: June 29, 1848; Philadelphia, Pennsylvania, U.S.
- Died: July 26, 1911 (aged 63); Ocean City, New Jersey, U.S.
- Batted: Unknown Threw: Unknown

MLB debut
- May 20, 1871, for the Philadelphia Athletics

Last MLB appearance
- May 24, 1875, for the Philadelphia Centennials

MLB statistics
- Batting average: .282
- Home runs: 2
- Runs batted in: 113
- Stats at Baseball Reference

Teams
- National Association of Base Ball Players Philadelphia Athletics (1868–1870) Keystone of Philadelphia (1869) National Association of Professional BBP Philadelphia Athletics (1871) Baltimore Canaries (1872–1873) Philadelphia Whites (1874) Philadelphia Centennials (1875)

Career highlights and awards
- Led NA in games played and at bats in 1872

John Young Radcliff (June 29, 1848 – July 26, 1911) was an American professional baseball player who played for the Philadelphia Athletics (1871), Baltimore Canaries (1872–1873), Philadelphia Whites (1874), and Philadelphia Centennials (1875). He was primarily a shortstop.

== Biography ==
Radcliff debuted with the Philadelphia Athletics of the National Association on May 20, 1871. In 28 games, he hit for a .303 batting average with 0 home runs and 22 runs batted in. He also had 5 stolen bases in his first year. The next year, playing for the Baltimore Canaries, he hit his first career home run and picked up 44 RBIs. He recorded 4 triples as well.

On June 28, 1871, Radcliff collected seven hits during a 49–33 victory over Troy. The contest was the highest-scoring game in MLB history (if you consider the NA to be a Major League).

In 1873, playing for Baltimore, Radcliff hit a career-high 13 doubles and had 33 runs batted in, with a .286 batting average. In 1874, playing for the Philadelphia Whites, he hit his second and final career home run, tying for the team lead in homers with George Bechtel.

In 1874, Radcliff was expelled from baseball for offering an umpire 175 dollars to help the Chicago White Stockings win a game.

Radcliff played his last season in 1875 with the Philadelphia Centennials, appearing in only 5 games, hitting a mediocre .174 with no home runs and no RBI. His final game was on May 24.

== Death ==
Radcliff died in Ocean City, New Jersey, on July 26, 1911, at the age of 63.

== See also ==
- Denny Mack – the Radcliff affair
