= Frank McKenna (baseball) =

American baseball player

- First baseman
- Born: Unknown
- Died: Unknown
- Batted: Unknown Threw: Unknown

MLB debut
- 1874, for the Philadelphia White Stockings

Last MLB appearance
- 1874, for the Philadelphia White Stockings

MLB statistics
- Games played: 1
- At bats: 4
- Hits: 0
- Stats at Baseball Reference

Teams
- Philadelphia White Stockings (1874)

Frank McKenna was a professional baseball shortstop who played in one game for the Philadelphia White Stockings in 1874.

McKenna had no hits in four at bats in his only career game.
