= Hugh Reid (baseball) =

American baseball player (1852–1928)

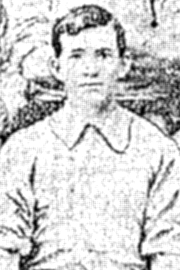
- Right fielder
- Born: May 10, 1852; Cleveland, Ohio, U.S.
- Died: December 22, 1928 (aged 76); Chicago, Illinois, U.S.
- Batted: Unknown Threw: Unknown

MLB debut
- August 26, 1874, for the Baltimore Canaries

Last MLB appearance
- August 26, 1874, for the Baltimore Canaries

MLB statistics
- Batting Average: .000
- Home Runs: 0
- RBI: 0
- Stats at Baseball Reference

Teams
- Baltimore Canaries (1874)

Hugh A. Reid (sometimes known as "Hugh Reed"), (May 10, 1852 – December 22, 1928) was an American outfielder in the National Association. He played in one game for the 1874 Baltimore Canaries.
