= John Cassidy (baseball) =

American baseball player (1855–1891)

- Right fielder
- Born: 1855; Brooklyn, New York, U.S.
- Died: July 3, 1891 (aged 35–36); Brooklyn, New York, U.S.
- Batted: Right Threw: Left

MLB debut
- April 24, 1875, for the Brooklyn Atlantics

Last MLB appearance
- August 12, 1885, for the Brooklyn Grays

MLB statistics
- Batting average: .246
- Home runs: 5
- Runs batted in: 191
- Stats at Baseball Reference

Teams
- Brooklyn Atlantics (1875); New Haven Elm Citys (1875); Hartford Dark Blues (1876); Brooklyn Hartfords (1877); Chicago White Stockings (1878); Troy Trojans (1879–1882); Providence Grays (1883); Brooklyn Grays (1884–1885)

John P. Cassidy (1855 – July 3, 1891) was an American right fielder in Major League Baseball from 1875 to 1885.

== Career ==
Growing up, Cassidy was an amateur pitcher in his hometown of Brooklyn, New York. He started his professional baseball career with the Brooklyn Atlantics of the National Association in 1875. That season, he had a 1–21 win–loss record, a 3.03 earned run average, and 9 strikeouts.

Cassidy continued his career as a right fielder, playing in the majors every season through 1885. In 1877, he played for the National League's Brooklyn Hartfords and ranked second in the league with a .378 batting average. It was the only time he batted .300.

Cassidy finished his 11-year career with 634 games played, a .246 batting average, 5 home runs, and 191 runs batted in. He died of dropsy in Brooklyn in 1891.
