= Terry Connell =

American baseball player and umpire (1855–1924)

- Catcher
- Born: June 17, 1855; Philadelphia, Pennsylvania, U.S.
- Died: March 25, 1924 (aged 68); Philadelphia, Pennsylvanis, U.S.
- Batted: Unknown Threw: Unknown

MLB debut
- June 20, 1874, for the Chicago White Stockings

Last MLB appearance
- June 20, 1874, for the Chicago White Stockings

MLB statistics
- Batting average: .000
- Home runs: 0
- Runs batted in: 0

Teams
- Chicago White Stockings (1874)

Terence G. Connell (June 17, 1855 – March 25, 1924) was an American professional baseball catcher and umpire. He played in the National Association for the 1874 Chicago White Stockings. He later worked as an umpire for parts of six seasons from 1884 to 1890 in the American Association and National League. He also worked as a police sergeant, and umpired in the Pennsylvania State League. According to baseball historian David Nemec, there is a lack of strong evidence that Terry Connell played in a major league game in 1874, and that it might have been another man with the surname Connell.
