= Dan Collins (baseball) =

American baseball player (1854–1883)

- Outfielder/Pitcher
- Born: July 12, 1854; St. Louis, Missouri, U.S.
- Died: September 21, 1883 (aged 29); New Orleans, Louisiana, U.S.
- Batted: Unknown Threw: Unknown

MLB debut
- June 8, 1874, for the Chicago White Stockings

Last MLB appearance
- August 19, 1876, for the Louisville Grays

MLB statistics
- Pitching Record: 1-1
- Earned run average: 4.91
- Batting average: .125
- Stats at Baseball Reference

Teams
- Chicago White Stockings (1874); Louisville Grays (1876)

Daniel Thomas Collins (July 12, 1854 – September 21, 1883) was an American professional baseball player who played pitcher in the Major Leagues from 1874 to 1876. Collins played for the Chicago White Stockings and the Louisville Grays.

== See also ==
- List of Major League Baseball annual strikeout leaders
