= John Smith (shortstop) =

American baseball player

- Shortstop
- Born: Unknown; Baltimore, Maryland, U.S.
- Died: Unknown
- Batted: Right Threw: Right

MLB debut
- April 14, 1873, for the Baltimore Marylands

Last MLB appearance
- May 21, 1875, for the New Haven Elm Citys

MLB statistics
- Batting average: .140
- Home runs: 0
- Runs batted in: 2
- Stats at Baseball Reference

Teams
- Baltimore Marylands (1873); Baltimore Canaries (1874); New Haven Elm Citys (1875)

John Smith was an American shortstop in the National Association from 1873 to 1875. He played for three teams in three seasons.

== Sources ==
- Career statistics from Baseball Reference · Retrosheet
