= Bill Stearns =

American baseball player (1853–1898)

- Pitcher / Outfielder
- Born: March 20, 1853; Washington, D.C., U.S.
- Died: December 30, 1898 (aged 45); Washington, D.C., U.S.
- Batted: unknown Threw: Right

MLB debut
- June 26, 1871, for the Washington Olympics

Last MLB appearance
- June 12, 1875, for the Washington Nationals

MLB statistics
- Win–loss record: 13–64
- Earned run average: 4.28
- Strikeouts: 24
- Stats at Baseball Reference

Teams
- National Association: Washington Olympics (1871); Washington Nationals (1872); Washington Blue Legs (1873); Hartford Dark Blues (1874); Washington Nationals (1875)

William Stearns (March 20, 1853 – December 30, 1898) was an American professional baseball player who played pitcher and outfielder in the National Association from 1871 to 1875. He was the first person who had played baseball in a major league to become a casualty of military service.

== Early life ==
Stearns was born in 1853 in Washington, D.C., and although he was only 12 years old when the American Civil War ended, he was a member of the Grand Army of the Republic, which indicates he served in some capacity during the war, perhaps as a drummer or messenger.

== Professional baseball ==
For the first three seasons of his career, Stearns appeared exclusively as a pitcher. In 1871—the first year of the National Association—he pitched two complete games for Washington Olympics, winning both, with a 2.50 ERA. In 1872 he pitched 11 complete games for the Washington Nationals, unfortunately losing all of them, with a 6.18 ERA. In 1873 he pitched 32 complete games for the Washington Blue Legs, posting a record of 7–25, with a 4.61 ERA.

In the final two seasons of his career, Stearns appeared both as a pitcher and an outfielder. In 1874 with the Hartford Dark Blues his pitching record was 3–14 with a 2.95 ERA, and he played 19 games in the outfield. In his final season of 1875—also the final year of the National Association—he was with the Washington Nationals, pitching to a 1–14 record with a 4.02 ERA, and playing 7 games in the outfield.

Stearns' career pitching record was 13–64 with a 4.28 ERA, and as a batter he had 411 plate appearances, hitting .191 with just two extra base hits, both doubles. He later served as an umpire during 1884.

== Spanish–American War ==
Bill Stearns
- Burial place: Arlington National Cemetery
- Military career
- Allegiance: United States
- Branch: United States Army
- Service years: 1898
- Rank: Private
- Unit: First District of Columbia Volunteers
- Conflicts: Spanish–American War

In 1898 with the outbreak of the Spanish–American War, Stearns volunteered for military service. He was a private with the First District of Columbia Volunteers, and deployed to Puerto Rico in July. While there he became ill and contracted malaria, and although he returned to his hometown in September, he never recovered and died there on December 30.

== Legacy ==
Stearns was the first person with major league baseball experience to become a casualty of military service. He is buried in Arlington National Cemetery.

To date, he holds the MLB record for lowest career Wins Above Replacement (WAR) with -9.5.
