= Everett Mills =

American baseball player (1845–1908)

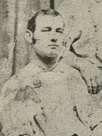
- First baseman
- Born: January 20, 1845; Newark, New Jersey, U.S.
- Died: June 22, 1908 (aged 63); Newark, New Jersey, U.S.
- Batted: Unknown Threw: Unknown

Major-league debut
- May 5, 1871, for the Washington Olympics

Last major-league appearance
- October 17, 1876, for the Hartford Dark Blues

Major-league statistics
- Batting average: .284
- Hits: 433
- Runs batted in: 204
- Stats at Baseball Reference

Teams
- National Association of Base Ball Players Newark Eurekas (1864–1867) Irvington of Irvington, NJ (1868) New York Mutuals (1868–1870) League player Washington Olympics (1871) Baltimore Canaries (1872–1873) Hartford Dark Blues (1874–1876) League manager Baltimore Canaries (1872)

Everett Mills (January 20, 1845 – June 22, 1908) was an American amateur and professional baseball player from Newark, New Jersey. He played in all five seasons of the National Association (1871–1875), and one season in the National League (1876). He played every one of his major-league games at first base save for one game in center field. In 1872, he became player-manager for the final 17 games of the season while a member of the Baltimore Canaries. The team finished in second place, and he would never manage again.

Mills died in his hometown of Newark at the age of 63, and was buried at Fairmount Cemetery.

Preceded by Bill Craver	Baltimore Canaries Managers; 1872	Succeeded by Cal McVey
