= Tom Carey (shortstop) =

American baseball player (1846–1906)

- Shortstop / Second baseman
- Born: March 1846; Brooklyn, New York, U.S.
- Died: August 16, 1906 (aged 60); San Francisco, California, U.S.
- Batted: Right Threw: Right

Major-league debut
- May 4, 1871, for the Fort Wayne Kekiongas

Last major-league appearance
- September 29, 1879, for the Cleveland Blues

Major-league statistics
- Batting average: .270
- Runs scored: 405
- Runs batted in: 270
- Stats at Baseball Reference

Teams
- National Association of Base Ball Players Baltimore Marylands (1870) League Player Fort Wayne Kekiongas (1871) Baltimore Canaries (1872–1873) New York Mutuals (1874) Hartford Dark Blues (1875–1877) Providence Grays (1878) Cleveland Blues (1879) League Manager Baltimore Canaries (1873) New York Mutuals (1874)

Thomas Joseph Carey (March 1846 – August 16, 1906), was an American professional baseball shortstop.

== Early life ==
Born in Brooklyn, New York, Carey joined the 17th New York Volunteer Infantry in September 1863. He claimed to have fought at Bentonville, Jonesboro and Atlanta before being discharged in July 1865.

== Baseball career ==
Carey played a total of nine seasons of major-league baseball, five of which were in the National Association (1871–1875), and the other four in the National League. During two of the seasons in the National Association, he also spent some time as player-manager, with a career record of 27 wins and 21 losses.

Carey played as a second baseman in his first three seasons in the National Association, and went hitless in three at bats for the Fort Wayne Kekiongas in the first professional game ever played on May 4, 1871, against the Cleveland Forest Citys.

After his playing days were over, he spent the 1882 season as an umpire.

== Later life ==
In May 1906, The San Francisco Call reported that Carey was struggling financially and that he was standing in the city's bread lines. He died later that year and is buried at the San Francisco National Cemetery.
