= Jack Remsen =

American baseball player (born 1850)

- Center fielder
- Born: April 1850; Brooklyn, New York, U.S.
- Died: Unknown
- Batted: Right Threw: Right

MLB debut
- May 2, 1872, for the Brooklyn Atlantics

Last MLB appearance
- October 15, 1884, for the Brooklyn Atlantics

MLB statistics
- Batting average: .244
- Home runs: 9
- RBIs: 201
- Stats at Baseball Reference

Teams
- Brooklyn Atlantics (1872–1873); New York Mutuals (1874); Hartford Dark Blues (1875–1876); St. Louis Brown Stockings (1877); Chicago White Stockings (1878–1879); Cleveland Blues (1879); Philadelphia Quakers (1884); Brooklyn Atlantics/Grays (1884)

John Jay Remsen (April, 1850 – After 1884) was an American Major League Baseball player who played mainly in center field for eight teams in nine seasons, from 1872 to 1884. He played for the Brooklyn Atlantics, New York Mutuals, Hartford Dark Blues, of the National Association; the Dark Blues, St. Louis Brown Stockings, Chicago White Stockings, Cleveland Blues, Philadelphia Quakers of the National League; and the Brooklyn Atlantics of the American Association.
