= Hartford Ball Club Grounds =

Former baseball grounds in Hartford, Connecticut

Coordinates: 41.757465°N 72.669252°W

- Interactive map of Hartford Ball Club Grounds
- Location: South corner of Wyllys Street and Hendricxsen Avenue
- Capacity: 10,000
- Surface: Grass

Construction
- Opened: May 1, 1874
- Closed: September 30, 1876

Tenant
- Hartford Dark Blues (National League) (1874–1876)

Hartford Ball Club Grounds was a baseball grounds in Hartford, Connecticut. It was home to the Hartford Dark Blues from 1874 to 1876, two years in the National Association and one in the National League.

The Hartford club remained in the League for 1877 but played its home games at Union Grounds in Brooklyn, New York, whose last professional tenant had gone out of business.

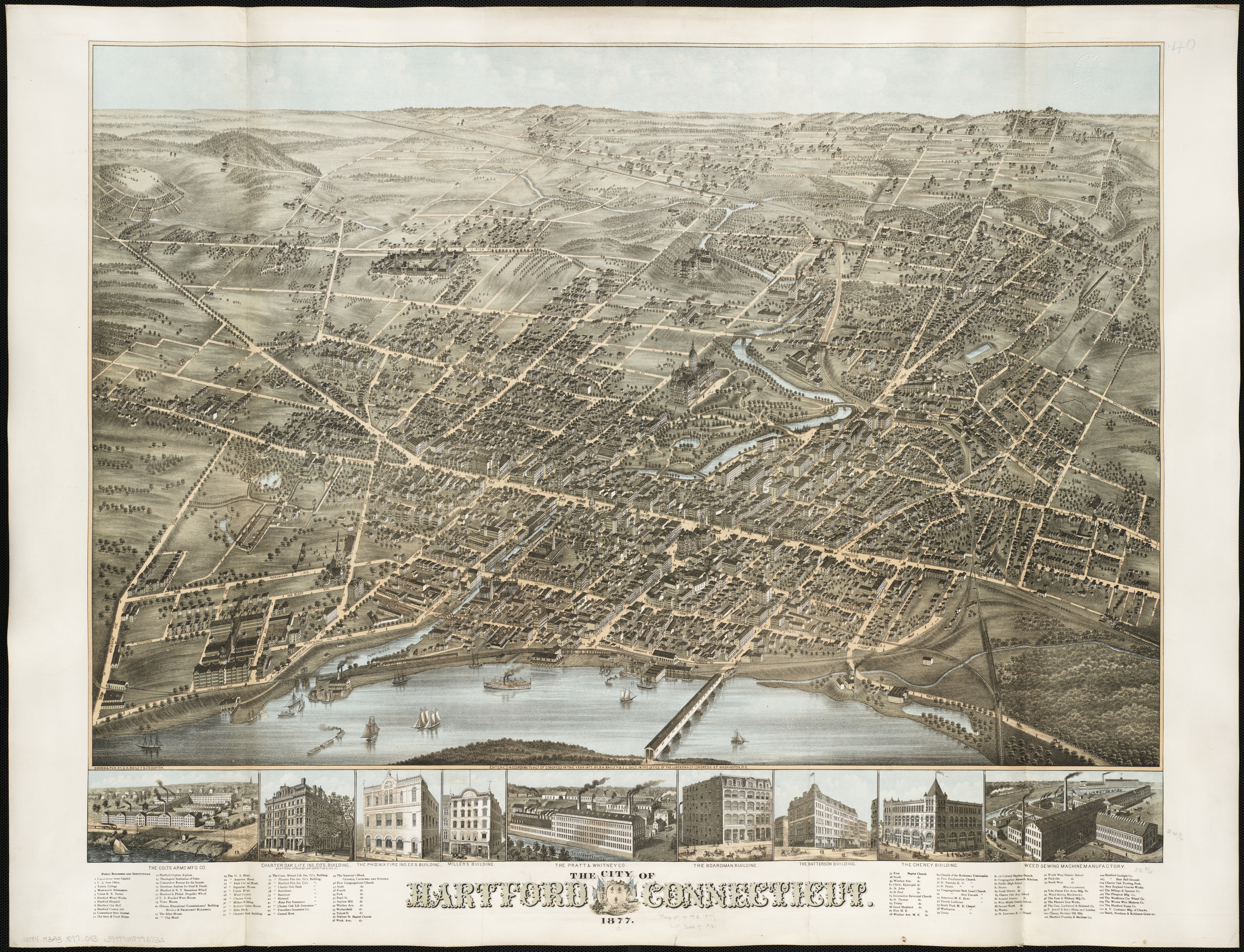
Section of a map of Hartford from 1877, showing the location of the park. (Select the image to view the full map.)

Contemporary maps show that the ballpark was bounded by Wyllys Street to the northwest and Hendricxsen (also spelled "Hendrixon") Avenue to the northeast, with trees and residences along the south sides of the field. The stands were situated along Wyllys, and the diamond was set up with home plate pointing northwest. Across Hendricxsen to the northeast was the Church of the Good Shepherd, bounded by Van Block Avenue on its northeast side. In modern times, Hendricxsen ends at Masseek Street, well to the southeast, but the driveway from Wyllys into the church parking lot approximates the old Hendricxsen. The former ballpark site is a large lawn across from the church and the parking lot.

The Hartford Base Ball Grounds was marked with a memorial bronze plaque in July 2008. The effort was led by Ronald Bolin. In February 2009 the plaque was stolen. It was recovered in 2017 from a scrap yard in Massachusetts. No decision has been made on whether to place it back on the site.

In June 2013, the bases were marked with commemorative granite slabs on their approximate original locations on the grounds field just in front of the Church of the Good Shepherd's Caldwell Colt Memorial. The tribute was created and financed made by The Friends of Vintage Base Ball.

== Football ==
Date	Home	Score	Away	Attendance
October 27, 1883	Wesleyan	8–19	Harvard	—
November 1, 1884	Wesleyan	16–0	Harvard	500
