= Hartford Dark Blues =

American baseball team

Years 1874–1877

Based in Hartford, Connecticut (1874–1876) Brooklyn, New York (1877)

Major league affiliations

National League (1876–1877); National Association of Professional Base Ball Players (1874–1875)

Team history
- Brooklyn Hartfords (1877); Hartford Dark Blues (1874–1876)

Ballpark
- Union Grounds (1877); Hartford Ball Club Grounds (1874–1876)

Colors
- Dark blue, silver

Owners
- Morgan Bulkeley

Managers
- Bob Ferguson (1875–1877); Lip Pike (1874)

Major league titles
- National League pennants 0; NAPBBP pennants 0

The Hartfords (more commonly called the Hartford Dark Blues because of their uniform color) were a 19th-century baseball team. The team was based in Hartford, Connecticut.

== History ==
In 1874, baseball in Hartford was being played in a fever pitch. As talk of forming a national professional league was going on, Morgan Bulkeley, Gershon Hubbell and Middletown native Ben Douglas Jr. leased land from Elizabeth Colt to build a base ball field and stadium with a covered grandstand, and set about forming a team, The Hartfords. Located on the corner of Wyllys and Hendrixsen Streets next to the Church of the Good Shepherd, the Hartford Ball Club Grounds was the finest in the country and saw the team come in second to Chicago in the National League's first professional year, 1876. That team that was led by Captain Bob Ferguson and was rounded out by pitchers Candy Cummings (purported inventor of the curve ball), Tommy Bond (the only pitcher in baseball history to have three 40-game winning years in a row), Tom Carey, Everett Mills, Bill Harbridge, Tom York, Dick Higham, Jack Burdock, Jack Remsen and Doug Allison.

The Hartford Dark Blues were a member of the National Association of Professional Base Ball Players in 1874 and 1875 and the National League in 1876 and 1877. In 1877 the team played in Brooklyn, New York as the Brooklyn Hartfords.

Playing at the Hartford Ball Club Grounds, in 1876 they joined the National League as a charter member. The team's owner, Morgan G. Bulkeley, was also the first president of the National League. Managed by their third baseman, Bob Ferguson, the Dark Blues went on to finish third in 1876 with a record of 47–21.

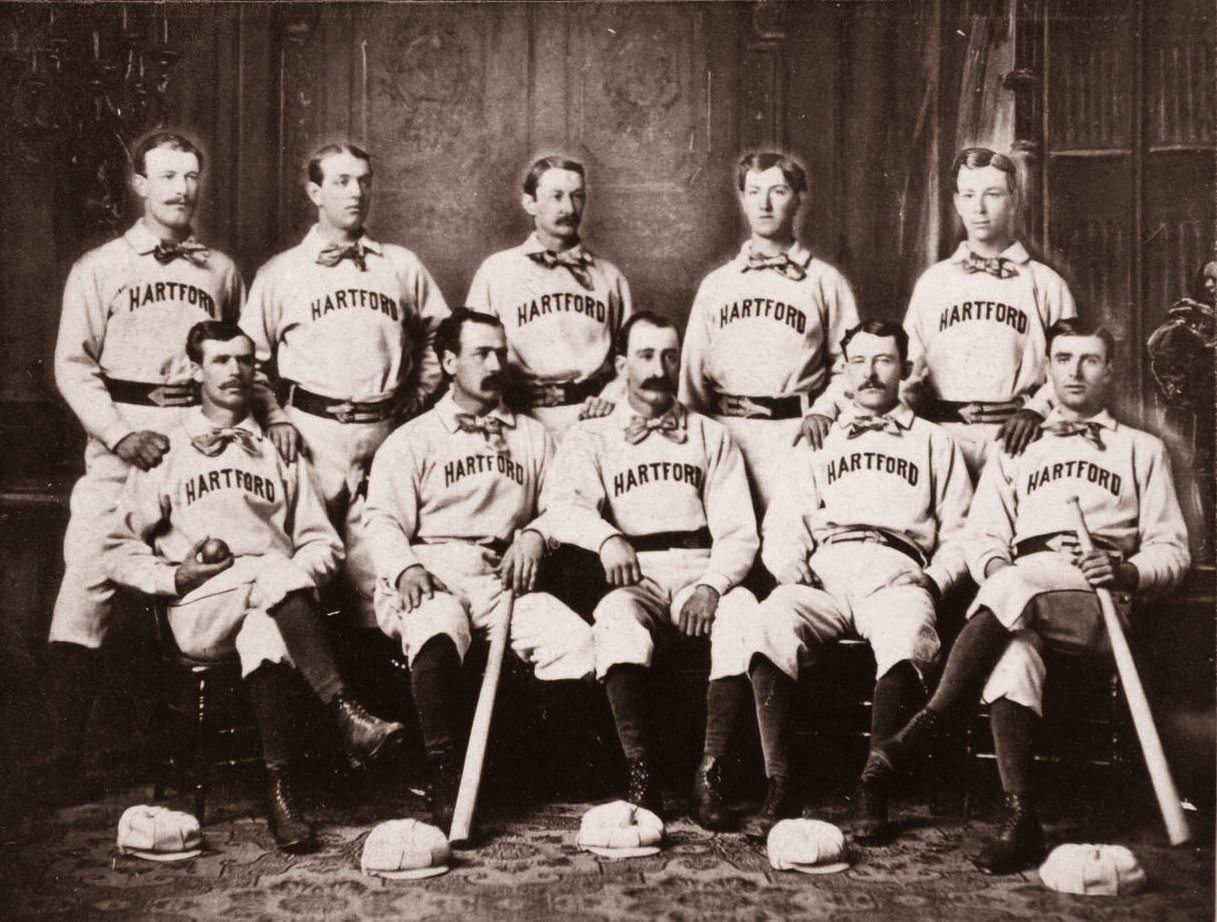
1875 Hartford Dark Blues

The team's strong suit was pitching, with both Tommy Bond and future Hall of Famer Candy Cummings finishing with an earned run average under 2.00. The pitching staff recorded the most complete games (69) and allowed the lowest number of home runs throughout the 70-game 1876 campaign (the Philadelphia Athletics also accomplished this feat that season). The team's best hitter was right fielder Dick Higham, who led the team in most offensive categories.

The team left Hartford and moved to Brooklyn, New York for the 1877 season to become the Brooklyn Hartfords. Managed again by Ferguson, the team finished in third again, with a record of 31–27. With Bond, Cummings and Higham all having left the team, the team's best player this year was undoubtedly right fielder John Cassidy, who batted .378 and also led the team in many other categories.

The team disbanded after the 1877 season and was replaced in the league with the Providence Grays.

Author Mark Twain was a fan of the team.

== Notable alumni ==
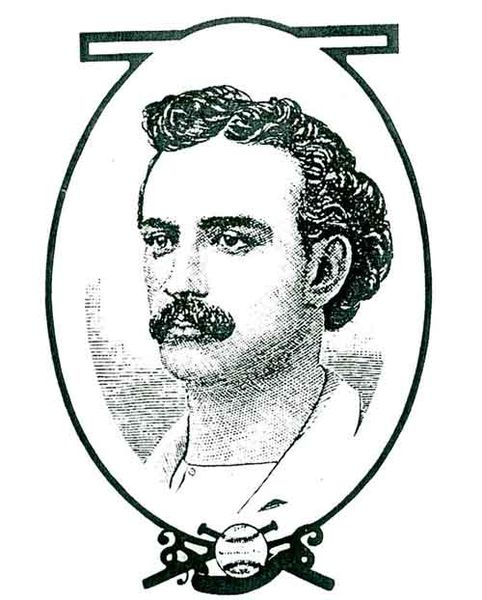
Lip Pike

- Lipman Pike, major league baseball; first Jewish baseball player; home run champion
- Tom Barlow, pioneer of the bunt, suffered from morphine addiction, mentioned in Ken Burns's Baseball
- Joe Start, a 27-year veteran who spanned the pre-professional to the professional era, and is credited with developing off-bag positioning of the first baseman

=== Baseball Hall of Famers ===
Hartford Dark Blues Hall of Famers
Inductee	Position	Tenure	Inducted	Notes
Candy Cummings	P	1875–1876	1939	Reputed inventor of the curveball

== See also ==
- 1874 Hartford Dark Blues season
- 1875 Hartford Dark Blues season
- 1876 Hartford Dark Blues season
- 1877 Brooklyn Hartfords season
- Hartford Dark Blues all-time roster

== General and cited references ==
- Arcidiacono, David (2003). Grace, Grit and Growling: The Hartford Dark Blues Base Ball Club, 1874–1877. East Hampton, CT: [Not identified]. OCLC 53280132.
