= Candy Cummings =

American baseball player (1848–1924)

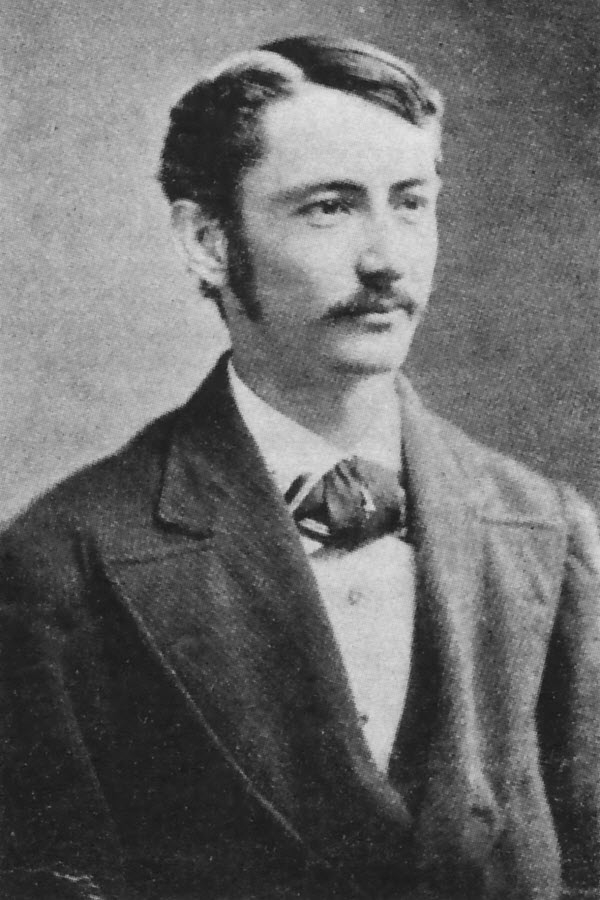
- Cummings in 1872
- Pitcher
- Born: October 18, 1848; Ware, Massachusetts, U.S.
- Died: May 17, 1924 (aged 75); Toledo, Ohio, U.S.
- Batted: Right Threw: Right

Major league debut
- April 22, 1872, for the New York Mutuals

Last major league appearance
- August 18, 1877, for the Cincinnati Reds

Major league statistics
- Win–loss record: 145–94
- Earned run average: 2.49
- Strikeouts: 259
- Stats at Baseball Reference

Teams
- National Association of Base Ball Players Excelsior of Brooklyn (1866–1867) Star of Brooklyn (1868–1871) League Player New York Mutuals (1872) Baltimore Canaries (1873) Philadelphia White Stockings (1874) Hartford Dark Blues (1875–1876) Cincinnati Reds (1877) Major league records: Highest strikeout-to-walk ratio in a single season: 20.50 in 1875

Member of the National

Baseball Hall of Fame
- Induction: 1939
- Election method: Old-Timers Committee

William Arthur "Candy" Cummings (October 18, 1848 – May 17, 1924) was an American amateur and professional baseball player. He played as a pitcher in the National Association and National League. Cummings is widely credited with inventing the curveball. He was elected to the Baseball Hall of Fame in 1939.

== Early life ==
Cummings was born in Ware, Massachusetts, on October 18, 1848. Four years later, his family moved to Brooklyn, New York. He attended Falley Seminary in Fulton, New York, from 1864 to 1866, and played for Falley's baseball team. He pitched his team to the county championship. After graduating from Falley, Cummings joined the Star Base Ball Club, one of Brooklyn's best clubs, pitching for its junior squad. Showing great promise, he was lured to another top Brooklyn club, Excelsior. At the age of 17, Cummings made his debut in the National Association of Base Ball Players with the Excelsior senior team. His first game with the Excelsior seniors was on August 14, 1866, against the New York Mutuals. For his performance, he received prophetic praise from the Brooklyn Eagle: "[H]e has only to keep on in the way he has begun, and he will one day (not far distant) be ranked among the best pitchers of the country." Two weeks later, he led his team to a 24–12 win against the Newark Eurekas. After the latter game, baseball writer Henry Chadwick commented on the skills of the young Cummings and his promising future with the Excelsior club. Cummings played for the Excelsiors next season, and continued as the main pitcher for the Stars of Brooklyn from 1868 to 1871.

His pitching skills led to his being called "Candy", a popular 19th-century nickname for a man who was the best at his craft.

== Major league career ==
Cummings, who stood 5'9" and weighed 120 pounds, compiled a 145–94 career record and 2.42 earned run average while playing for five different professional teams from 1872 to 1877. Between 1872 and 1875, he pitched in the National Association of Professional Base Ball Players (NA) with the New York Mutuals, Baltimore Canaries, Philadelphia White Stockings and Hartford Dark Blues. Cummings won 63.3% of his games over his four NA seasons. In 1876, when the National League (NL) was founded, he was still with the Hartford club, which was one of the league's founders, and compiled a 16–8 pitching record. In December 1876, he signed with a semi-professional club in Lynn, Massachusetts, the Live Oaks, to pitch and manage the club in 1877. He represented the Live Oaks at a convention that founded the International Association for Professional Base Ball Players, and was elected the association's first president. In the middle of the 1877, he left the Live Oaks and returned to the NA, pitching for the Cincinnati Reds, where he appeared in only 19 games and posted a 5–14 win-loss record. Among other records, Cummings was the first player to pitch two complete games in one day: September 9, 1876, when he beat the Cincinnati Red Stockings twice, 14–4 and 8–4.

== Invention of the curveball ==
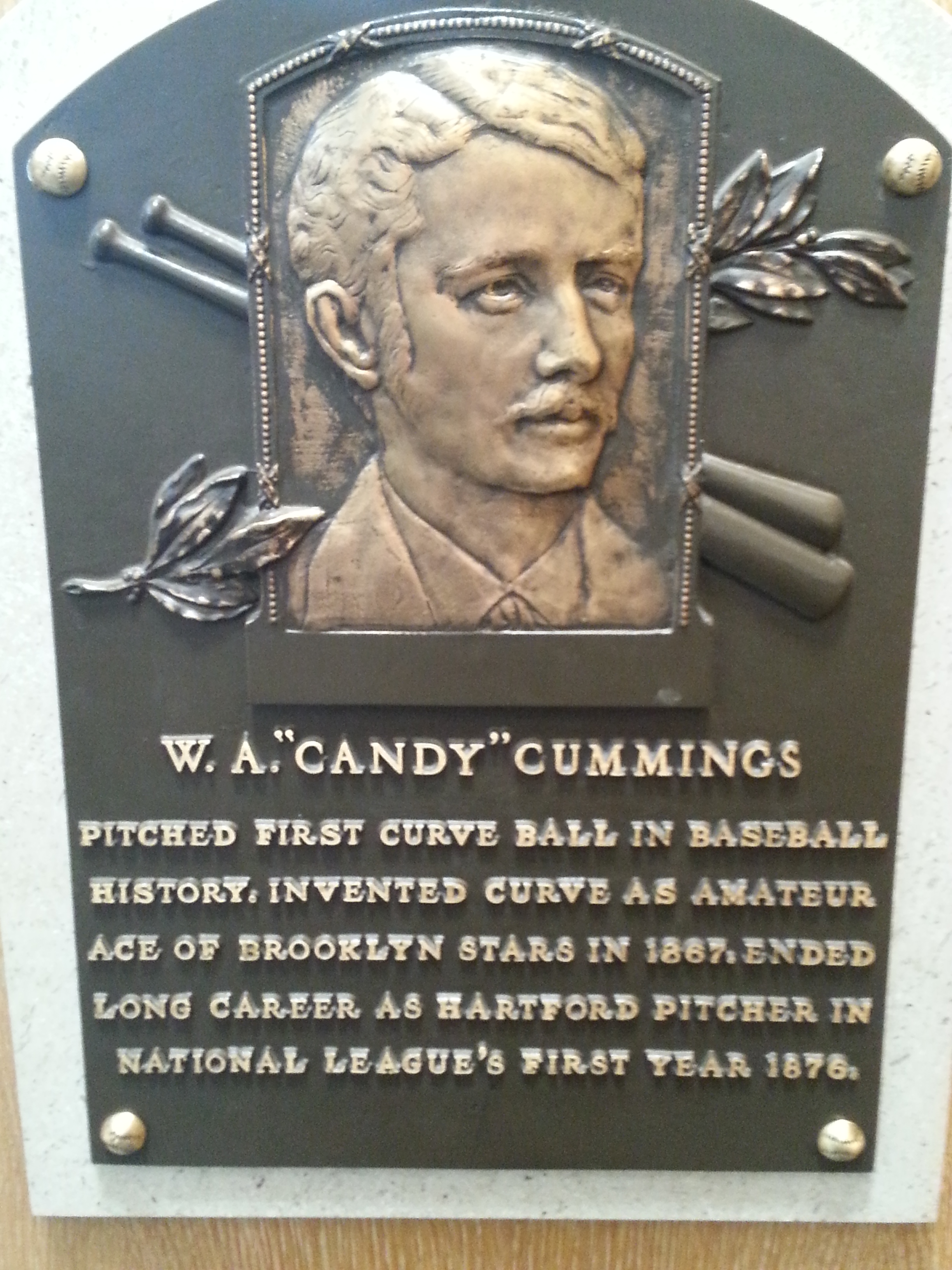
Plaque of Cummings at the Baseball Hall of Fame

Cummings is often credited with being the inventor of the curveball. In his biography of Cummings, published in 2022, Stephen Katz provides proof. According to Cummings, he discovered the idea of the curveball while studying the movement sea shells made when thrown. After noticing this movement, he began trying to make a baseball move the same way, and thus created the new pitch. Cummings pitched the curveball underhand, as required by the rules of the National Association of Base Ball Players, but with a twist and snap of the wrist, which was illegal under the rules of the National Association of Base Ball Players. Those rules required the pitcher to deliver pitches with a straight arm, swinging perpendicularly by his side. But the rules were progressively relaxed so as to permit the arm and wrist motion that were necessary for pitching the curveball.

Cummings first used the curveball in competition while pitching for Brooklyn's Excelsior club, in a game on October 7, 1867, against the Harvard College team. He would later recall from that game: "A surge of joy flooded over me that I shall never forget. I felt like shouting out that I had made a ball curve. ... But I said not a word and saw many a batter at that game throw down his stick in disgust." Cummings' introduction of the curveball radically changed pitching, and fundamentally transformed the game of baseball.

Several other pitchers claimed to have invented the curveball. One was Fred Goldsmith. Goldsmith maintained that he gave a demonstration of the pitch on August 16, 1870, at the Capitoline Grounds in Brooklyn, New York, and that renown sportswriter Henry Chadwick had covered it in the Brooklyn Eagle on August 17, 1870. However, Stephen Katz, in his biography of Cummings, shows that Goldsmith's claim was not credible, and that Goldsmith's reference to an article by Chadwick in the Brooklyn Eagle was likely fabricated. According to a 2002 article by ESPN's Steve Wulf, Cummings was "fairly well-connected" in baseball, as evidenced by his position with the International Association. Baseball leaders Chadwick, Harry Wright and Albert Spalding, among others, credited Cummings as the inventor of the curveball.

== Invention of railway coupling device ==
In 1873, Cummings invented a railway coupling device, improving on the coupling device then in use, which was dangerous. He patented his invention in 1874. He refined his design in 1876, and patented it in 1877. Cummings received a small royalty for his invention throughout his life.

== Later life ==
After organized baseball, Cummings moved to Athol, Massachusetts, where he owned and operated a paint and wallpaper shop. Cummings died in Toledo, Ohio, on May 17, 1924. He is buried at Aspen Grove Cemetery in Ware, Massachusetts. Cummings was posthumously inducted into the Baseball Hall of Fame in 1939.

== See also ==
- List of Major League Baseball career ERA leaders
- List of Major League Baseball annual shutout leaders
