= Philadelphia White Stockings =

Former American professional baseball team

The Philadelphia White Stockings were an early professional baseball team. They were a member of the National Association from 1873 to 1875. Their home games were played at the Jefferson Street Grounds. They were managed by Fergy Malone, Jimmy Wood, Bill Craver, Mike McGeary, and Bob Addy.

During their three-year existence the White Stockings won 102 games and lost 77 for a winning percentage of .570.

== See also ==
- Philadelphia White Stockings all-time roster
- 1873 Philadelphia White Stockings season
- 1874 Philadelphia White Stockings season
- 1875 Philadelphia White Stockings season
