= Baltimore Canaries =

Former American professional bassball team

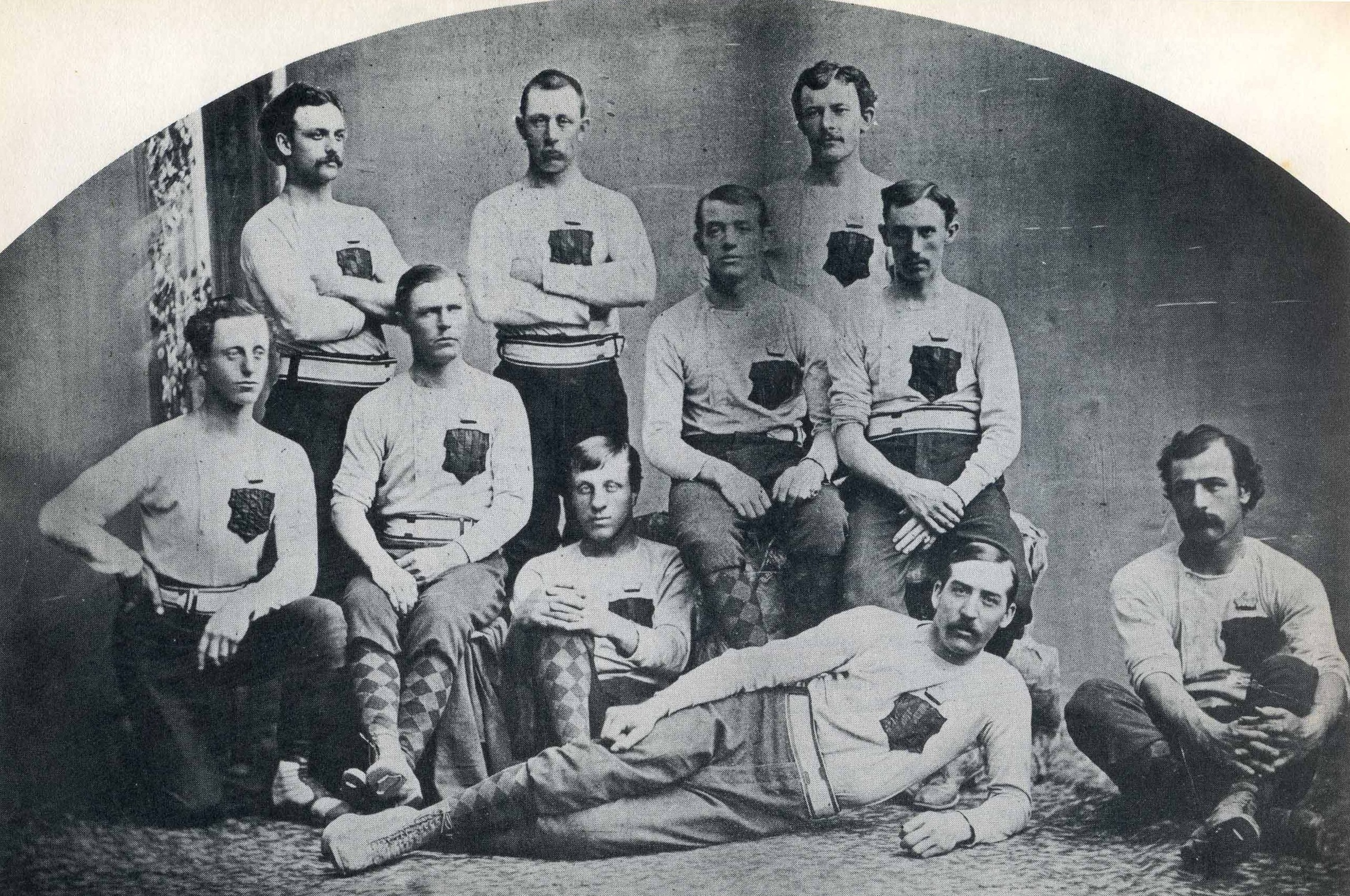
1872 Baltimore Canaries

The Baltimore Canaries were a professional baseball club in the National Association from 1872 to 1874.

== History ==
The team was usually listed as Lord Baltimore in the box scores of the day, and were also referred to as the Yellow Stockings. The canary and yellow stockings labels were in reference to their uniform colors.

Though visually striking, the club's uniforms were not necessarily universally acclaimed. The Chicago Inter-Ocean reporter, covering a game staged in Chicago on May 29, 1872, described "the Baltimore nine, clad in yellow pants, white shirts, white hats, and ugly looking black and yellow stockings."

The Canaries played their home games at Newington Park in Baltimore, Maryland. Newington Park was located on Pennsylvania Avenue in Baltimore city. They played under five different managers in their three seasons, winning 78 games and losing 79.

== Notable alumni ==
- Candy Cummings, Baseball Hall of Famer
- Bobby Mathews, won 297 games in his career
- Lip Pike, major league baseball 4x home run champion

== See also ==
- Baltimore Canaries all-time roster
- 1872 Baltimore Canaries season
- 1873 Baltimore Canaries season
- 1874 Baltimore Canaries season
