= 1874 in baseball =

The following are the baseball events of the year 1874 throughout the world.

== Champions ==
- National Association: Boston Base Ball Club

== Statistical leaders ==
National Association
| Stat | Player | Total |
|---|---|---|
| AVG | Levi Meyerle (CHI) | .394 |
| HR | Jim O'Rourke (BOS) | 5 |
| RBI | Cal McVey (BOS) | 71 |
| W | Al Spalding (BOS) | 52 |
| ERA | Dick McBride (PHA) | 1.64 |
| K | Bobby Mathews (NY) | 82 |

== National Association final standings ==
| National Association | W | L | T | Pct. | GB |
|---|---|---|---|---|---|
| Boston Red Stockings | 52 | 18 | 1 | .739 | — |
| New York Mutuals | 42 | 23 | — | .646 | 7½ |
| Philadelphia Athletics | 33 | 22 | — | .600 | 11½ |
| Philadelphia White Stockings | 29 | 29 | — | .500 | 17 |
| Chicago White Stockings | 28 | 31 | — | .475 | 18½ |
| Brooklyn Atlantics | 22 | 33 | 1 | .402 | 22½ |
| Hartford Dark Blues | 16 | 37 | — | .302 | 27½ |
| Baltimore Canaries | 9 | 38 | — | .191 | 31½ |

== Notable seasons ==
- Boston Red Stockings pitcher Al Spalding has a record of 52–16, leading the NA with 52 wins and 617.1 innings pitched. He has a 1.92 earned run average and a 111 ERA+.
- Chicago White Stockings second baseman Levi Meyerle leads the NA with a .394 batting average, a .889 OPS, and a 183 OPS+. He has 65 runs scored and 45 runs batted in.

== Events ==
=== January–March ===
- January 29 – Albert Spalding arrives in England to set up a tour for the Boston and Athletic Clubs to demonstrate American baseball to the English.

=== April–June ===
- May 5 – Tommy Bond makes his professional debut, throwing a 4-hitter and defeating Lord Baltimore.
- May 6 – Dick McBride of Athletic throws a 1-hitter in a win against crosstown rival Philadelphia.
- May 13 – The Chicago Club plays the first professional game in Chicago by a Chicago team since the Great Chicago Fire of 1871. The "White Stockings" win 4–0 over Athletic before 4,000 fans.
- June 18 – Playing without suspended pitcher George Zettlein, the Chicagos are humiliated by Mutual 38-1. The Mutuals collect 33 hits, but are outdone by Chicago defensive miscues as they commit 36 errors in the game.

=== July–September ===
- July 10 – Jimmy Wood, player-manager for several teams in the NA, has his right leg amputated above the knee due to infection. Wood would be re-hired by Chicago to replace Fergy Malone and be on the bench managing 5 weeks after the amputation.
- July 16 – The Boston and Athletic Clubs depart from Philadelphia for England for their baseball exhibition tour.
- September 9 – John Radcliff is dismissed from the Philadelphia Club after umpire William McLean testified that Radcliff had offered him $175 to fix a game.
- September 9 – Boston and Athletic return from their England trip, arriving in New York.

=== October–December ===
- October 20 – The Boston Base Ball Club win their 3rd consecutive pennant with a 14–7 victory over Athletic of Philadelphia.

== Births ==
- January 14 – Jack Taylor
- January 22 – Jay Hughes
- February 1 – Harry Bemis
- February 22 – Bill Klem
- February 23 – Billy Lauder
- February 24 – Honus Wagner
- March 12 – Charles Weeghman
- March 16 – Bill Duggleby
- March 18 – Nixey Callahan
- March 24 – Roy Thomas
- April 7 – John Ganzel
- April 8 – Bert Myers
- May 8 – Eddie Boyle
- June 5 – Jack Chesbro
- June 5 – Frank Huelsman
- June 20 – Win Mercer
- June 26 – Topsy Hartsel
- July 8 – Jay Parker
- July 9 – Jack Powell
- July 13 – William G. Bramham
- July 14 – Jesse Tannehill
- September 5 – Nap Lajoie
- September 17 – Willie Sudhoff
- September 21 – Grant "Home Run" Johnson
- October 12 – Jimmy Burke
- October 15 – Emil Frisk
- October 19 – Tom McCreery
- October 31 – Harry Smith

== Deaths ==
- April 9 – Charlie Mills, age 29, catcher for the 1871 New York Mutuals.
