= Cleveland Forest Citys all-time roster =

List of baseball players

The Cleveland Forest Citys were a professional baseball team based in Cleveland, Ohio for two seasons in the National Association from 1871 to 1872.

== Keys ==
Abbreviations
| Name | Name of the player by official records |
| Position | Position that player played in the field |
| Seasons | The seasons played for this franchise by the player |
| * | Indicates that player was a player-manager |
| § | Indicates that player was a player-manager and inducted into the National Baseball Hall of Fame and Museum |

Position
| C | Catcher | 1B | First baseman |
| 2B | Second baseman | 3B | Third baseman |
| SS | Shortstop | LF | Left fielder |
| CF | Center fielder | RF | Right fielder |
| SP | Starting pitcher | OF | Outfielder |
| UT | Utility player | IF | Infielder |

== Players ==
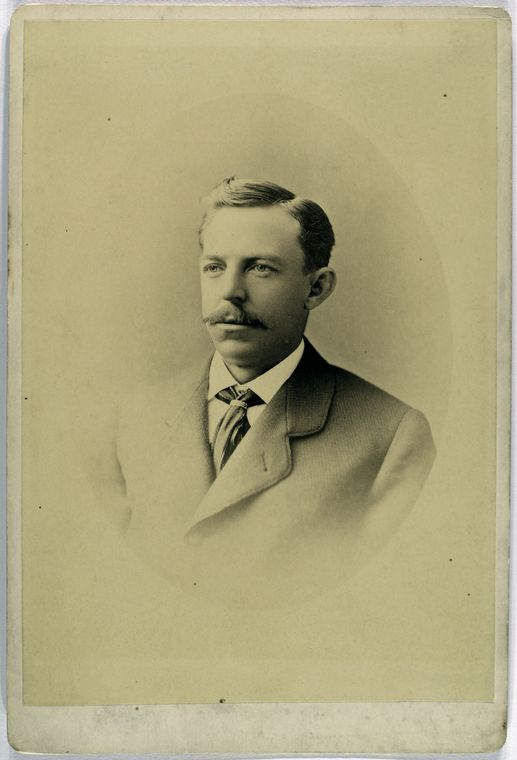
Starting third baseman for both seasons, Ezra Sutton

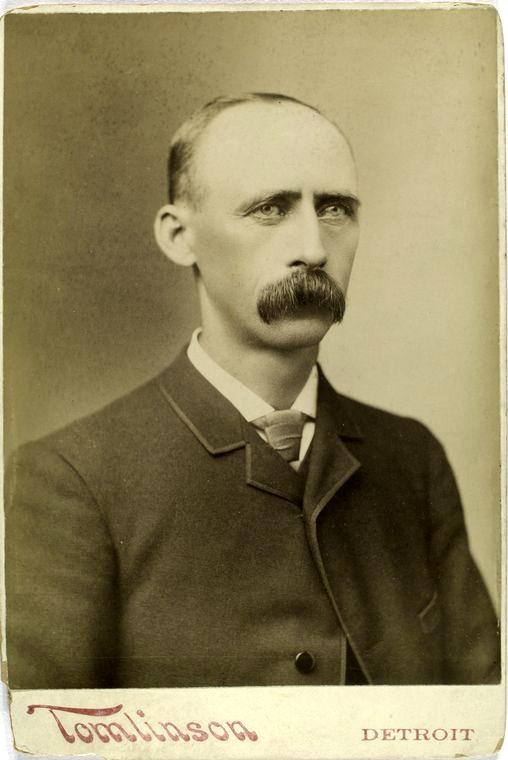
Deacon White, the club's catcher and short-time manager

| Player | Position | Seasons | Notes | Ref. |
|---|---|---|---|---|
| Art Allison | CF | 1871–1872 | | |
| John Bass | SS | 1871 | | |
| Joe Battin | SS | 1871 | | |
| Jim Carleton | 1B | 1871–1872 | | |
| George Ewell | RF | 1871 | | |
| Scott Hastings^{*} | UT | 1872 | | |
| Jim Holdsworth | SS | 1872 | | |
| William Johnson | 2B / RF | 1871 | | |
| Gene Kimball | UT | 1871 | | |
| Martin Mullen | RF | 1872 | | |
| Charlie Pabor^{*} | LF | 1871–1872 | | |
| Al Pratt | SP | 1871–1872 | | |
| Joe Quest | UT | 1871 | | |
| Joe Simmons | 1B / OF | 1872 | | |
| Ezra Sutton | 3B | 1871–1872 | | |
| Charlie Sweasy | 2B | 1872 | | |
| Deacon White^{§} | C | 1871–1872 | | |
| Elmer White | RF | 1871 | | |
| Rynie Wolters | SP / RP | 1872 | | |
