= 1871 Cleveland Forest Citys season =

1871 Cleveland Forest Citys
- League: National Association of Professional Base Ball Players
- Ballpark: National Association Grounds
- City: Cleveland, Ohio
- Record: 10–19 (.345)
- League place: 8th
- Managers: Charlie Pabor

The Cleveland Forest Citys played their first season in 1871 as a charter member of the National Association of Professional Base Ball Players. They finished eighth in the league with a record of 10–19. Pitcher Al Pratt led the NA in strikeouts, with 34.

== First game ==
The honor of playing the first game of the newly organized National Association of Professional Baseball Players was decided by coin flip.

Bobby Mathews, 5 ft 5 in (1.65 m), 140 lbs, and 20 years old, hurled a 2–0 shutout for the Kekiongas. Deacon White, catcher for the Cleveland Forest Citys got 3 hits in 4 at-bats; the other Cleveland players only shared 2 hits among them. Deacon White scored the first hit, the first extra-base hit (a double) and was the first to hit into a double-play.

The game was rained out in the top of the 9th inning. Attendance was 200.

Bobby Mathews, who went on to play five seasons each in the National Association, National League, and American Association, is the only player ever to pitch 100 games or to win at least 50 in three different major leagues. He is credited with inventing the spitball and the out-curve. Deacon White was another historic player, ending his 22-year career as playing owner of Buffalo's Brotherhood team.

== Regular season ==
=== Season standings ===
Pos	Team	Pld	W	L	T	RF	RA	RD	PCT	GB
1	Philadelphia Athletics (C)	28	21	7	0	376	266	+110	.750	—
2	Chicago White Stockings	28	19	9	0	302	241	+61	.679	2
3	Boston Red Stockings	31	20	10	1	401	303	+98	.661	2
4	Washington Olympics	32	15	15	2	310	303	+7	.500	7
5	New York Mutuals	33	16	17	0	302	313	−11	.485	7.5
6	Troy Haymakers	29	13	15	1	351	362	−11	.466	8
7	Fort Wayne Kekiongas	19	7	12	0	137	243	−106	.368	9.5
8	Cleveland Forest Citys	29	10	19	0	249	341	−92	.345	11.5
9	Rockford Forest Citys	25	4	21	0	231	287	−56	.160	15.5

Source: Baseball Reference
(C) Champions

=== Record vs. opponents ===
1871 National Association Records Sources:
Team	BOS	CHI	CLE	FW	NY	PHI	ROC	TRO	WSH
Boston	—	1–3	3–1	2–0	2–2	3–1	3–0	3–2	3–1–1
Chicago	3–1	—	2–1	2–0	3–1	2–3	3–0	1–1	3–2
Cleveland	1–3	1–2	—	0–3	3–2	0–3	3–1	2–2	0–3
Fort Wayne	0–2	0–2	3–0	—	1–2	0–2	1–1	1–1	1–2
New York	2–2	1–3	2–3	2–1	—	2–3	3–1	1–3	3–1
Philadelphia	1–3	3–2	3–0	2–0	3–2	—	3–0	3–0	3–0
Rockford	0–3	0–3	1–3	1–1	1–3	0–3	—	1–2	0–3
Troy	2–3	1–1	2–2	1–1	3–1	0–3	2–1	—	2–3–1
Washington	1–3–1	2–3	3–0	2–1	1–3	0–3	3–0	3–2–1	—

=== Roster ===
1871 Cleveland Forest Citys
Roster
Pitchers: Al Pratt	Catchers: Deacon White; Infielders: John Bass; Jim Carleton; William Johnson; Gene Kimball; Joe Quest; Ezra Sutton	Outfielders: Art Allison; Joe Battin; George Ewell; Charlie Pabor; Elmer White	Manager: Charlie Pabor

== Player stats ==
=== Batting ===
==== Starters by position ====
Note: Pos = Position; G = Games played; AB = At bats; H = Hits; Avg. = Batting average; HR = Home runs; RBI = Runs batted in

Pos	Player	G	AB	H	Avg.	HR	RBI
C	Deacon White	29	146	47	.322	1	21
1B	Jim Carleton	29	127	32	.252	0	18
2B	Gene Kimball	29	131	25	.191	0	9
SS	John Bass	22	89	27	.303	3	18
3B	Ezra Sutton	29	128	45	.352	3	23
OF	Charlie Pabor	29	142	42	.296	0	18
OF	Elmer White	15	70	18	.257	0	9
OF	Art Allison	29	137	40	.292	0	19

==== Other batters ====
Note: G = Games played; AB = At bats; H = Hits; Avg. = Batting average; HR = Home runs; RBI = Runs batted in

Player	G	AB	H	Avg.	HR	RBI
William Johnson	16	67	15	.224	0	7
Joe Quest	3	13	3	.231	0	2
Joe Battin	1	3	0	.000	0	0
George Ewell	1	3	0	.000	0	0

=== Pitching ===
==== Starting pitchers ====
Note: G = Games pitched; IP = Innings pitched; W = Wins; L = Losses; ERA = Earned run average; SO = Strikeouts

Player	G	IP	W	L	ERA	SO
Al Pratt	28	224.2	10	17	3.77	34

==== Relief pitchers ====
Note: G = Games pitched; IP = Innings pitched; W = Wins; L = Losses; ERA = Earned run average; SO = Strikeouts

Player	G	IP	W	L	ERA	SO
Charlie Pabor	7	29.1	0	2	6.75	0
