= Al Pratt =

Al Pratt may refer to:

- Al Pratt (baseball) (1848-1937), American baseball pitcher and manager
- Atom (Al Pratt), a DC Comics superhero
