= Elmer White =

American baseball player (1849–1872)

- Outfielder / Catcher
- Born: December 7, 1849; Caton, New York, US
- Died: March 17, 1872 (aged 22); Scio, New York, US
- Batted: Unknown Threw: Unknown

National Association debut
- May 4, 1871, for the Cleveland Forest Citys

Last National Association appearance
- September 27, 1871, for the Cleveland Forest Citys

National Association statistics
- Batting average: .257
- Hits: 18
- At bats: 70
- Stats at Baseball Reference

Teams
- Cleveland Forest Citys (NA) (1871)

Willard Elmer White (December 7, 1849 – March 17, 1872) was an American professional baseball player. He served primarily as an outfielder but also as a catcher in 1871 with the Cleveland Forest Citys of the National Association. Although he broke his arm running into a fence during a game on June 22, he played 15 of Cleveland's 29 games in their inaugural season, batting .257. However, he died of tuberculosis in March 1872, becoming the first player from a professional baseball league to die. White was the cousin of Deacon White and Will White.

== Early life ==
Willard Elmer White was born in Caton, New York, on December 7, 1849. His parents were Benjamin and Minerva White, and he was the oldest of three children, along with sisters Ada (born sometime around 1852) and Ina (born sometime around 1862). Growing up, White played baseball with his cousin James (nicknamed Deacon), two years his senior. Though his parents thought he was squandering his time with the game, White had decided by the mid-1860s that he wanted baseball to be his occupation. He appears in the 1870 census (taken on July 5, 1870) as living in Corning with his parents and sisters. His profession was listed as "Base Ball Player."

== First years with the Cleveland Forest Citys ==
In 1868, White began playing for the Forest Citys, an amateur team in Cleveland, Ohio. Deacon played for them as well. The team folded after the season, but a new one was formed the next year that featured a mix of professional and amateur players. The Whites signed on with the new club, joining a roster that included Al Pratt and Art Allison. All these men were still with the team in 1871 when it became a founding member of the National Association, the first professional baseball league.

Some contemporary news reports from these early years erroneously stated that Elmer White and Deacon White (then known simply as "Jim White") were brothers.

== National Association (1871) ==
On May 4, 1871, White played in the first professional league baseball game in history, when the Forest Citys took on the Fort Wayne Kekiongas at the Kekionga Ball Grounds. According to Baseball Reference, White is credited as being the first player to debut in organized baseball. Playing right field for the Forest Citys, White struck out three times against Bobby Mathews, who hurled a shutout in Fort Wayne's 2–0 victory.

Though White normally served as an outfielder, Charlie Pabor, Cleveland's manager, also had him catch three games. His season was interrupted on June 19, in a game he was catching against the New York Mutuals. A poor throw from an outfielder caused him to race to the edge of the playing field, and he broke his arm as he ran into a fence. The Forest Citys lost 10–6, and White was unable to play following the incident.

However, the injury did not end White's season. After missing 11 games, he was back playing for the ballclub on August 30, when Cleveland was defeated 12–10 by the Troy Haymakers. On the last day of the season, September 27, White recorded two hits in five at bats. He scored a run in the game and drove in two more, though Cleveland lost 9–7 to the Boston Red Stockings.

Despite the injury, White played more than half of the games on Cleveland's schedule (15 of 29). In 71 plate appearances (70 at bats), he batted .257 with 13 runs scored, 18 hits, two doubles, and nine runs batted in (RBI). He only struck out three times after the season's first game, but his total of six tied him with Al Reach and John McMullin for fifth in the league. White made seven errors defensively, and his .788 fielding percentage was below the league's .833 average.

== Death ==
After the season, White was sure he would play for Cleveland again in 1872. However, he was diagnosed with tuberculosis over the offseason. At first, he was optimistic he would recover; Deacon remembered that he fought the "good fight." His condition continued to worsen, and he died of the disease on March 17, 1872, in Scio, New York, at the age of 22. With his death, White became the first recorded professional league baseball player to die. He is buried in his family's plot at the Elmwood Cemetery in Caton.

== Relatives ==
White's cousin Deacon went on to play for 20 seasons and was elected into the Hall of Fame in 2013. Another of White's cousins, Will, was a pitcher for 10 years, winning 40 or more games in a season four times. The January 1889 issue of Sporting Life indicates that White was also related to Warren White, who played in the National Association from 1871 to 1875.

== See also ==
- List of baseball players who died during their careers
