= Will White =

American baseball player and manager (1854–1911)

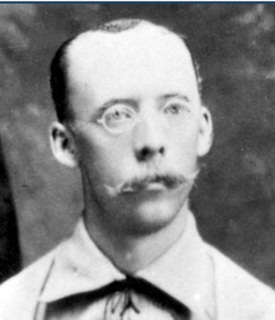
- White in 1882
- Pitcher / Player-manager / Outfielder
- Born: October 11, 1854; Caton, New York, U.S.
- Died: August 31, 1911 (aged 56); Port Carling, Ontario, Canada
- Batted: Both Threw: Right

MLB debut
- July 20, 1877, for the Boston Red Caps

Last MLB appearance
- July 5, 1886, for the Cincinnati Red Stockings

MLB statistics
- Win–loss record: 229–166
- Earned run average: 2.28
- Strikeouts: 1,041
- Complete games: 394
- Managerial record: 44–27–1
- Winning percentage: .620
- Stats at Baseball Reference

Teams
- As player: Boston Red Caps (1877); Cincinnati Reds (1878–1879); Cincinnati Stars (1880); Detroit Wolverines (1881); Cincinnati Red Stockings (1882–1886); As manager: Cincinnati Red Stockings (1884)

Career highlights and awards
- American Association pennant (1882); 2× American Association wins champion (1882, 1883); American Association ERA champion (1883); Cincinnati Reds Hall of Fame; MLB records: Most innings pitched in a season (680 in 1879); Most games started in a season (75 in 1879); Most complete games in a season (75 in 1879); Most batters faced in a season (2,906 in 1879)

William Henry White (October 11, 1854 – August 31, 1911) was an American professional baseball pitcher and player-manager from 1875 to 1889. He played all or parts of 10 seasons in Major League Baseball, primarily for the Cincinnati Reds in the National League (1878–1879) and the Cincinnati Red Stockings in the American Association (1882–1886). He had three 40-win, and one 40-loss, seasons in Cincinnati. During the 1882 and 1883 seasons, he led the American Association in wins, compiling an 83–34 win–loss record and a 1.84 earned run average (ERA).

Over the course of 10 major league seasons, White compiled a 229–166 record with a 2.28 ERA. His career ERA ranks ninth on the all-time list of Major League Baseball career ERA leaders. White also set a number of major league pitching records and still holds several. His 1879 totals of 75 complete games, 75 games started, 680 innings pitched, and 2,906 batters faced remain major league records and are widely considered unbreakable. He was the player-manager of the Red Stockings for 71 games during the 1884 season, compiling a 44–27–1 managerial record. He is also remembered as the first, and for many years only, major league player to wear eyeglasses on the baseball field.

== Early years ==
White was born in 1854 in the town of Caton in Steuben County, New York. His parents were Lester White (born c. 1820), a farmer, and his wife, Adeline (born c. 1823). The couple had at least eight children: Oscar Leroy (born c. 1844), James (born 1847), Melville (born c. 1851), William, Phebe Davis (born c. 1856), Estelle (born c. 1858), George (born c. 1862) and Hattie (born c. 1867); they also adopted a girl named Phebe Maynard (born c. 1876) when they were in their fifties.

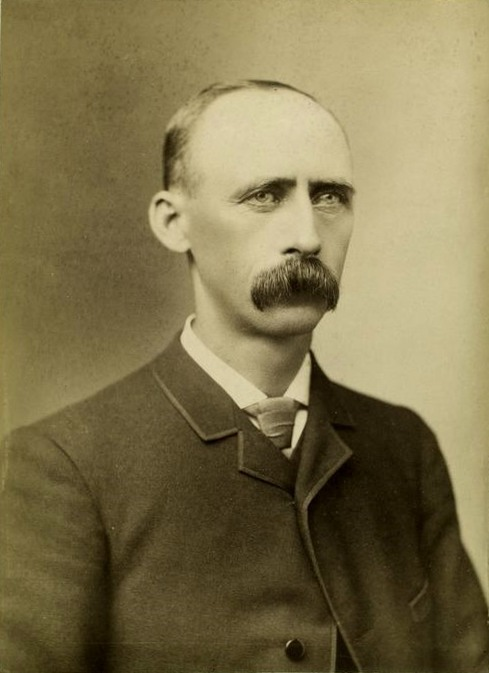
White's older brother, Deacon White

White came from a baseball-playing family. When he was age 13, his older brother, Deacon White, began playing professional baseball; Deacon was eventually inducted into the Baseball Hall of Fame. His cousin, Elmer White, played in the major leagues in 1871, while Will was 16, and died in 1872 at age 21. The January 1889 issue of Sporting Life indicates that White was also related to Warren White, a native of Milton, New York, who played in the major leagues from 1871 to 1875.

== Professional baseball ==
=== Minor leagues ===
Records of White's early years in organized baseball during the mid-1870s are scarce. In an 1892 account on "The History of Base Ball Pitching", The Sporting Life wrote that White was "about the first" pitcher to develop "the sharp curve ball", doing so in 1875. During the 1876 season, White reportedly pitched for the Binghamton Crickets, where John Kelly was his catcher.

=== Boston ===
In 1877, White's older brother, Deacon White, was playing at first base for the Boston Red Caps of the National League. Deacon, by then an established veteran, brought Will with him to Boston for a tryout. Will was given a three-game tryout with the Red Caps, making his major league debut on July 20, 1877, at age 22. He pitched three complete games and compiled a 2–1 record and a 3.00 earned run average (ERA) in 27 innings pitched. During White's tryout with the Red Caps, Deacon and Will White "formed the first brother battery in the game."

=== Eyeglasses ===
Will White accomplished another major league first. He was the first, and for many years the only, major league player to wear eyeglasses on the baseball field. In a later account of White's early years, The Sporting Life wrote: "White was about the only pitcher of consequence who wore glasses. He had great control of the ball, and he could land one over the plate whenever he wanted to notwithstanding he was handicapped by weak eyes." The novelty of his wearing eyeglasses was a regular subject of coverage, and a 1911 newspaper story on "Eye-Glassed Players" noted that there were none in the game at that time and had been none since White. The famous slugger, Dan Brouthers, was quoted in the article as follows: "Will White, I suppose, was the last of the eye-glassed professionals. Near-sighted as Roosevelt – and Teddy could play a good game of ball, I'll bet – White was nevertheless a great pitcher. He had the curves, the speed and all sorts of scientific trickery."

=== Cincinnati (NL) ===
In 1878, the White brothers joined the Cincinnati Reds, where they were battery-mates for the next three seasons. The 1878 season was White's first full season in professional baseball. He appeared in 52 games for the Reds, all complete games, and compiled a 30–21 record and a 1.79 ERA. By July 1878, White had earned the nickname "Whoop-La." After pitching a four-hitter against Harry Wright's Boston club, the Cincinnati Enquirer ran a headline, "WHOOP-LA, WILLIAM!" When George Wright struck out swinging to end the eight inning, the crowd in Cincinnati "arose almost to a man and such cheers and waving of hats and handkerchiefs were never heard and seen on the grounds." When White then walked to the plate and hit the first pitch for a double, there was more "howling" by screaming, frantic fans.

In 1879, Deacon White took over as the manager of the Red Stockings for the first 16 games of the season. The brothers also continued to work together as pitcher and catcher. After Will threw a four-hit shutout in June 1879, the Cincinnati Enquirer wrote that there could be "not a doubt in the world that with Jim [Deacon] to back him Will White as a pitcher is to-day without a peer." During the 1879 season, Will White established several major league records. Out of the 80 games played that year by the Red Stockings, White started 75 of them, threw 75 complete games, totaled 680 innings pitched and 2,906 batters faced, and compiled a 43–31 record with a 1.99 ERA and 232 strikeouts. White's 1879 totals remain major league records in games started, complete games, innings pitched and batters faced. Pud Galvin tied White's games started record in 1883, but White's other records remain unmatched more than 130 years later. White's complete game and inning pitched records have been ranked with "baseball's most unbreakable records," and the most "unapproachable" records.

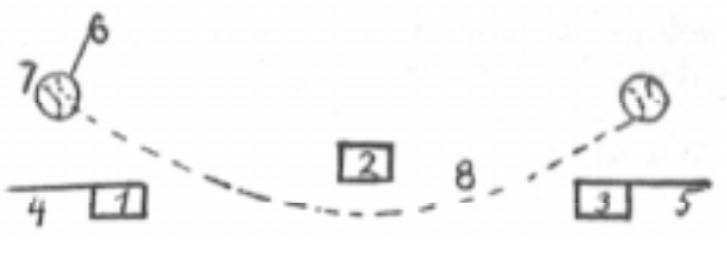
Diagram from O. P. Caylor's article on White's curve ball demonstration

O. P. Caylor, one of the founders of the American Association, recalled that White was given the task in 1879 of demonstrating the curveball to Col. John A. Joyce, the "moving spirit" behind the Red Stockings. White was at the time "one of the most expert curvers in the profession." Caylor described the demonstration that was conducted as follows:

"White stood upon the left of the fence at one end so that his hand could not possibly pass beyond the straight line, and pitched the ball so that it passed to the right of the middle post. This it did by three or four inches, but curved so much that it passed the third post a half foot to the left. The diagram on page 403 [reproduced at right] will illustrate the test."

In 1880, White pitched in fewer games, but was even more effective by some measures than he had been in his record-setting 1879 season. In his third full season, White started 62 games, all complete games, and compiled a 2.14 ERA in 517 1/3-inning pitched. White's performance in 1880 also earned him a 5.2 Wins Above Replacement (WAR) rating—the tenth highest WAR rating in the National League that year. Unfortunately, White played for a team that compiled the lowest batting average in the National League; the 1880 Reds hit for a .224 average, 21 points below the league average and 55 points below the league-leading Chicago White Stockings. Lacking offensive support, White finished the season with an 18–42 win–loss record.

=== Detroit ===
Cincinnati was removed from the National League after the 1880 season, and the team folded, leaving White without a club. In April 1881, the newest National League club, the Detroit Wolverines, signed White after its principal pitcher, George Bradley, suffered with a pulmonary hemorrhage during a pre-season practice. When White was signed, the Detroit Free Press wrote of him: "He is too well known to base ball admirers to need an introduction."

On May 5, 1881, at Buffalo, New York, White appeared in the fourth game played by the Detroit Wolverines. He allowed eight runs and 13 hits, including two hits by his brother, Deacon White, who had joined the Buffalo club. Hardy Richardson also hit a bases-loaded triple in the ninth inning and was thrown out at home plate. The Wolverines lost the game, 8–1, but the Detroit Free Press wrote: "White, considering that he has had no practice to speak of this season, pitched very well, but he failed to bother the batsmen very badly."

White appeared in his second, and final, game for the Wolverines on May 12, 1881. Detroit lost by a 10–4 score to the Worcester Worcesters, and the press was less understanding after a second poor showing. The Detroit Free Press wrote: "White, who is an old-fashioned, straight-armed pitcher, not a modern underhanded thrower, is not the man for a pitcher's position. The Worcesters had no trouble in batting him, and the only wonder is that they made no more base hits and runs."

In his only two games for the 1881 Detroit Wolverines, White compiled an 0–2 record and a 5.00 ERA in 18 innings. The Detroit team settled on George Derby as its lead pitcher, with Stump Weidman as the change pitcher, and White was released after two starts. White finished the 1881 season playing for a semipro team in Cincinnati.

=== Cincinnati (AA) ===
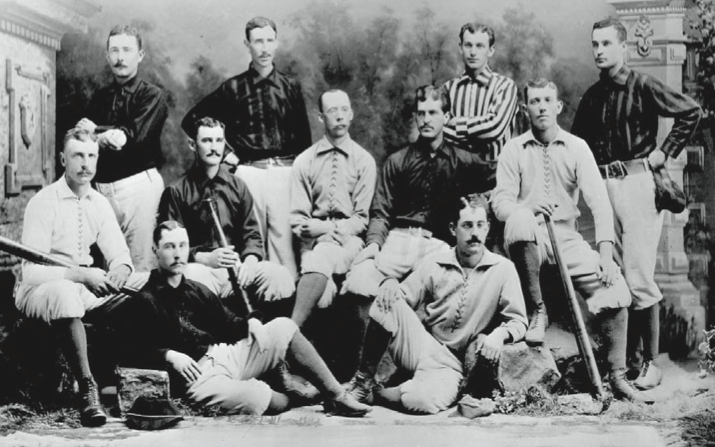
White (middle row, third from left) with the 1882 Cincinnati Red Stockings

In November 1881, White signed to play with the Cincinnati Red Stockings for the inaugural season of the new American Association. During the 1882 season, White compiled a 40–12 record with a 1.54 ERA. He led the American Association in wins (40), complete games (52), and innings pitched (480). White also developed into one of the best-fielding pitchers in baseball. During the 1882 season, White had 223 fielding assists, a total that stood as the major league record for pitchers until Ed Walsh totaled 227 assists in 1907; White's total of 223 assists remains the second highest in major league history for a pitcher. White's 11.1 WAR rating in 1882 was the highest in the major leagues. White also proved to be a decent hitter during the 1882 season, batting .266 with 28 runs scored and 25 runs batted in. White pitched right-handed, but he was a switch hitter. Despite refusing to pitch on Sundays, White led the Red Stockings to their first pennant in 1882.

In 1883, White compiled a 43–22 record and led the league with 43 wins, a 2.09 ERA and six shutouts. White also ranked among the American Association's leaders with a 9.1 WAR rating (2nd), 1.000 Walks plus hits per inning pitched (WHIP) rating (3rd), 65 games played as pitcher (2nd), 577 innings pitched (2nd), 64 games started (2nd), and 64 complete games (2nd). In August 1883, White was baptized in the Second Advent denomination by being immersed in the Ohio River near Dayton, Kentucky.

In 1884, White became a player-manager, managing the Reds for the first 71 games of the season and leading the club to a 44–27 record. In August 1884, White decided to step down as manager, believing he was "of too easy a disposition"; he persuaded his catcher, Pop Snyder, to take over as manager. White remained the Reds' ace pitcher during the 1884 season, compiling a 34–18 and 3.32 ERA. He led the league with seven shutouts and again ranked among the league's leading pitchers with a 5.7 WAR rating (8th), 34 wins (5th), 456 innings pitched (7th), and 52 complete games (7th).

Baseball historian David Nemec wrote that White's career suffered in 1884 when the American Association adopted a rule granting a batter a base if he was hit by a pitched ball. According to Nemec, the new rule deprived White of "one of his chief weapons – intimidation." White set a major league record in 1884 with 35 hit batsmen, a total that remains the ninth highest in major league history. He led the league again in 1885 with 27 batsmen hit by pitch. In an article titled "Will White's Misery", the Cincinnati Enquirer wrote after a 12–4 loss to the Metropolitans, "If ever a person had the conceit knocked completely out of him, that person was Will White yesterday afternoon."

White played his last full major league season for the Reds in 1885. He appeared in 34 games, threw 33 complete games and compiled an 18–15 record with a 3.53 ERA. In late August 1885, The Sporting Life correspondent from Cincinnati reported that White would not do any further pitching for the Reds "for some time to come", noting that the local fans held a "bitter feeling" toward White, which had caused the club president to employ other pitchers. According to baseball historian Joseph M. Overfield, White's "arm had nothing left" by the end of the 1885 season.

In January 1886, The Sporting Life reported that White had "gone back to his first love – the grocery business", opening a grocery in Fairmount, near Cincinnati. Another published story that same month reported that White's "delivery wagon can be seen almost any day on the street. White is not a loafer, and when base ball fails he makes money just like other people."

White returned briefly to baseball in June and July 1886, appearing in three games for Cincinnati. He compiled a 1–2 record as his ERA jumped to 4.15 in 26 innings pitched. He appeared in his last major league game on July 5, 1886, at age 31. Two days after White's last game, The Sporting Life reported: "Will White seems to have disappeared from the scene of action as quickly as he appeared. Surely two games didn't settle him."

=== Buffalo ===
In December 1888, White's older brother, Deacon, and Jack Rowe, both of whom had been part of baseball's famed "Big Four" throughout the 1880s, purchased the Buffalo Bisons, a minor league baseball club, intending to be co-owners, managers, and players. In March 1889, Deacon White announced that he was also going into business in Buffalo with his brother, Will, and that Will had agreed to "twirl for the Bisons whenever needed." In June 1889, White agreed to become a regular pitcher and also to serve as an assistant manager. With Will White returning to the game, The Sporting Life again focused on his glasses: "Will White still has his spectacles with him. He is the only professional player who wears them." By early July, however, the newspaper was focused on his performance as it reported: "Will White is still quite a pitcher."

However, the brothers' plans were thwarted by William Nimick, the owner of the Pittsburgh Alleghenys. The Pittsburgh club held the rights to Rowe and Deacon White and refused to release them, saying, "If they don't want to play in Pittsburgh, they'll play nowhere." In July 1889, Rowe and Deacon White agreed to play for Pittsburgh, and Will White was left in Buffalo to take over as "solo manager" of the Bisons. After two years away from baseball, White started 20 games for the 1889 Bisons, threw 17 complete games, and compiled a 7–13 record and a 2.33 ERA in 174 innings pitched.

=== Career statistics ===
During his 10 years in the major leagues, White compiled a 229–166 win–loss record. He ranks among the major leagues' all-time career leaders with a 2.28 ERA (9th), 394 complete games (17th), 1.111 Walks and Hits per Innings Pitched (27th), 221 wild pitches (8th), 106 errors as pitcher (15th), 1.260 walks per 9 innings pitched (17th), and 36 shutouts (63rd).

== Later years ==
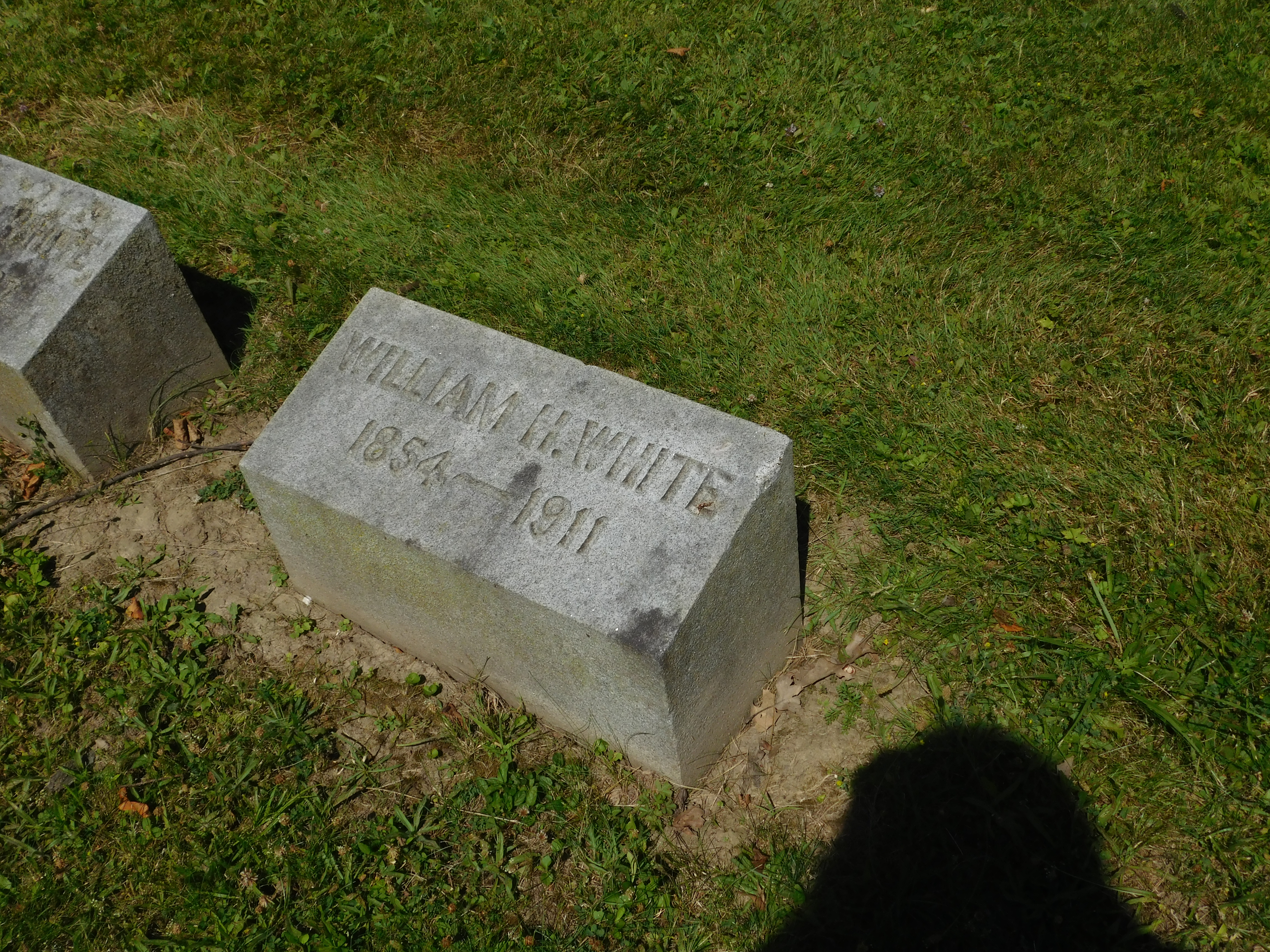
Will White's grave at Forest Lawn Cemetery

White was married in approximately 1876 to Harriet Holmes. They had a daughter, Katherine, born in December 1876. After retiring from baseball, White and his wife lived in Buffalo, New York. White worked with his brother, Deacon, in the optical supply business, doing business as the Buffalo Optical Company. In 1895, The Sporting Life wrote that the brothers owned 99% of the company, which was a "great success" and had "taken a handsome store on Main street, Buffalo."

At the time of the 1900 U.S. Census, White and his wife were living in Buffalo with their daughter, and White was employed as an optician. In 1910, White remained living in Buffalo working as an optician. His household at that time included his wife and daughter, as well as a nephew and a cousin.

White died in August 1911 at his summer home in Port Carling, Ontario, Canada. The cause of death was drowning. According to one account, he was teaching his niece to swim, suffered a heart attack while in the water and died. He was buried at Forest Lawn Cemetery in Buffalo.

== See also ==
- List of Major League Baseball career wins leaders
- List of Major League Baseball career ERA leaders
- List of Major League Baseball career WHIP leaders
- List of Major League Baseball annual wins leaders
- List of Major League Baseball annual ERA leaders
- List of Major League Baseball annual shutout leaders
- List of Major League Baseball player-managers
