= John Bass (baseball) =

American baseball player (1848–1888)

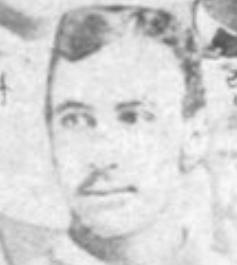
- Shortstop
- Born: July 22, 1848; Charleston, South Carolina, U.S.
- Died: September 25, 1888 (aged 40); Denver, Colorado, U.S.
- Batted: Switch Threw: Right

MLB debut
- May 4, 1871, for the Cleveland Forest Citys

Last MLB appearance
- August 20, 1877, for the Hartford Dark Blues

MLB statistics
- Batting average: .290
- Home runs: 3
- Runs batted in: 19
- Stats at Baseball Reference

Teams
- National Association of Base Ball Players: Union of Morrisania (1870); National Association of Professional BBP: Cleveland Forest Citys (1871); Brooklyn Atlantics (1872); Hartford Dark Blues (1877)

John Elias Bass (July 22, 1848 – September 25, 1888) was an American professional baseball player who played shortstop in the major leagues from 1871-1877. He played for the Cleveland Forest Citys, Brooklyn Atlantics, and Hartford Dark Blues.

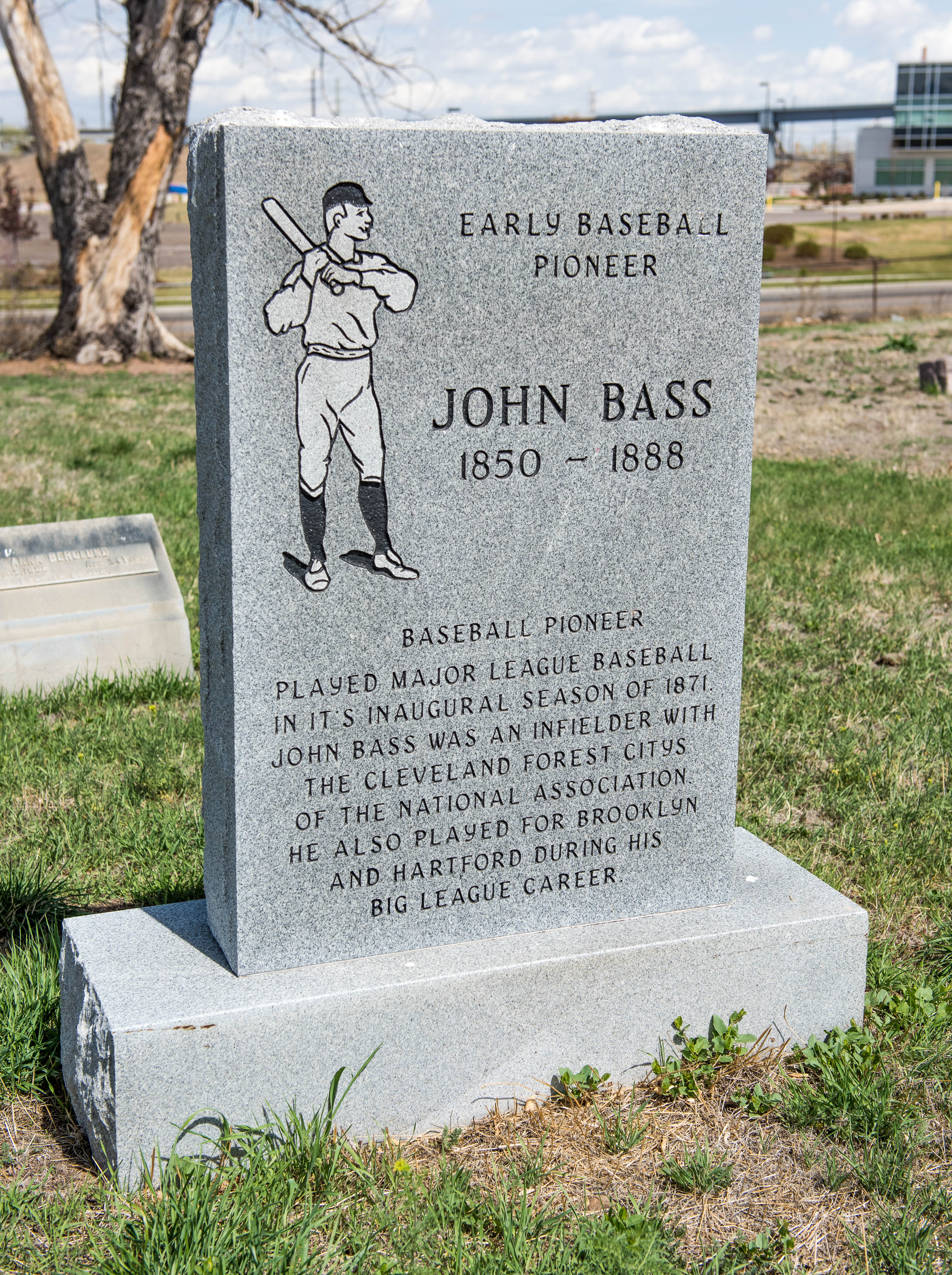
Grave stone in Riverside Cemetery, Denver, Colorado

In 1871, he led the National Association in triples with ten.

Bass served in Company F of the 1st New York Cavalry Regiment during the American Civil War. He is buried in Riverside Cemetery in Denver, Colorado.
