= Al Thake =

American baseball player (1849–1872)

- Left fielder
- Born: September 21, 1849; Wymondham, England
- Died: September 1, 1872 (aged 22); Fort Hamilton, New York
- Batted: Unknown Threw: Unknown

Major league debut
- June 13, 1872, for the Brooklyn Atlantics

Last major league appearance
- August 28, 1872, for the Brooklyn Atlantics

Major league statistics
- Batting average: .295
- Home runs: 0
- Runs batted in: 15
- Runs scored: 14
- Stats at Baseball Reference

Teams
- Brooklyn Atlantics (1872)

Albert Thake (September 21, 1849 – September 1, 1872) was an American professional baseball left fielder for the Brooklyn Atlantics of the National Association. Joining the team in 1872, he played 18 games for them, batting .295 with 14 runs scored, 23 hits, 2 doubles, 2 triples, 0 home runs, 15 runs batted in (RBI), and 2 stolen bases. Thake died on September 1, 1872, when he drowned off the coast of Fort Hamilton while fishing.

== Early life ==
Albert Thake was born on September 21, 1849, in Wymondham, England. His family emigrated to the United States when he was a young boy, and settled in Cleveland, Ohio. The 1860 Census lists Albert Thake as the youngest of William and Mary Thake's five children. An 1861 Cleveland city directory lists William Thake as a "malster" (i.e., a brewery worker) living at 63 Bolivar Road. The addresses have been renumbered since then, but Bolivar Road still exists: it is a side street located adjacent to Progressive Field, the home of Major League Baseball's Cleveland Guardians. (The ballpark was not built until 1994.)

The Thake family moved to Brooklyn sometime during the 1860s.

Albert Thake became interested in baseball as a young man after moving to Brooklyn.

During or shortly before the spring of 1867, Thake joined the Brooklyn fire department's Hose 6 company. On May 30, 1867, he testified before the Brooklyn Fire Commission about an accident his fire company was involved in on March 28, 1867. Four of his fellow fire fighters were expelled from the department, but Thake kept his job and played at least two games in the summer of 1867 for Hose 6's baseball team.

He also played for well-known local amateur teams such as the Star Club and the Athletics.

== Professional career ==
The National Association became the first fully professional baseball league in 1871. The Atlantics joined the league in 1872. Thake played outfield for the team. He made his debut on June 13, recording a hit in five at bats as the Atlantics were defeated 17–7 by the Baltimore Canaries. On July 29, he had a career-high four runs batted in (RBIs), though the effort came in a 17–12 loss to the Boston Red Stockings. He had three RBIs on August 6 in a 15–8 victory over the Middletown Mansfields. Thake's only appearance at a position other than left field came on August 22, when he played second base during part of a 15–4 loss to the New York Mutuals. In his last game of the season, on August 28, he had a hit, a run scored, and an RBI in a 26–12 loss to the Philadelphia Athletics.

== Death ==
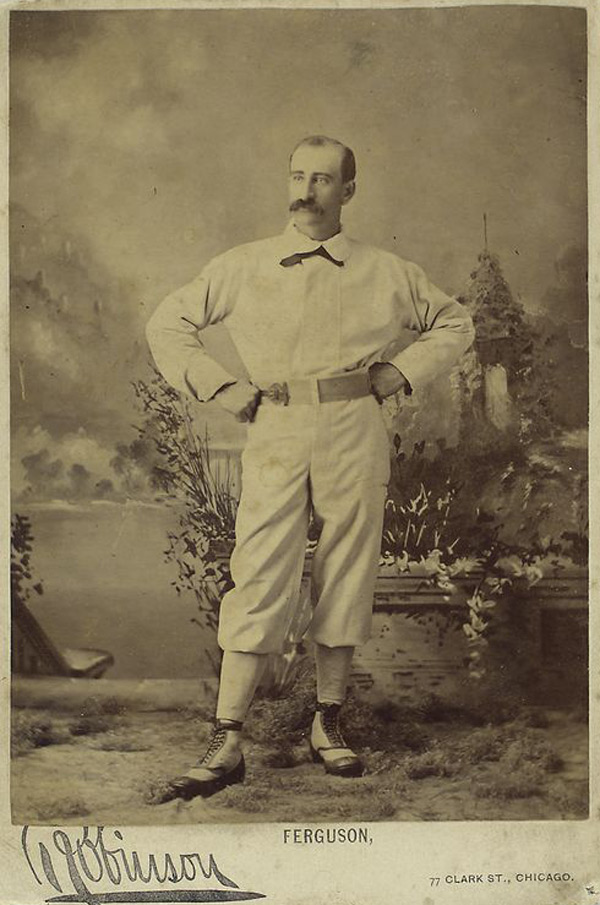
Bob Ferguson served as Thake's manager during his time with the Atlantics, and he helped arrange a benefit game to raise money for Thake's mother after Thake's death.

On September 1, 1872, Thake and a friend went fishing at Fort Hamilton, near where the Verrazzano–Narrows Bridge is now located. They had just caught a fish when a wave forced Thake into the water. The New York Post reported that he was caught in fishing nets, while The New York Times stated that the current swept him away. He drowned, and his body was later discovered on the banks of Bass Creek in Raritan Bay. He was 22 years old.

The Atlantics postponed their game against the Brooklyn Eckfords on September 2, and both teams flew flags at half mast at their baseball fields. On September 10, Thake's funeral was held at his mother's home, following which he was buried at Green-Wood Cemetery in Brooklyn. Thake's teammate and manager Bob Ferguson arranged a benefit game on October 23 to help raise money to cover Mrs. Thake's expenses. Former members of the Brooklyn Atlantics and members of the 1869 Cincinnati Red Stockings played against each other in the game. Notable participants included future Hall of Fame members Albert Spalding, George Wright, and Harry Wright. Weather was poor the day of the game, causing the proceeds to total about $300.

== Career statistics and reputation ==
In 18 games (78 at bats), Thake batted .295 with 14 runs scored, 23 hits, 2 doubles, 2 triples, 0 home runs, 15 RBIs, and 2 stolen bases. In The Cooperstown Chronicles (2014), Frank Russo writes, "His .295 lifetime batting average suggests that he might have had a promising career ahead of him." Thake was well-liked by his contemporaries, both those he played baseball with and those he knew from his personal life. They thought he had exemplary character.

== See also ==
- List of baseball players who died during their careers
