= Gene Kimball =

American baseball player (1850–1882)

- Second baseman
- Born: August 31, 1850; Rochester, New York
- Died: August 2, 1882 (aged 31); Rochester, New York
- Batted: Unknown Threw: Unknown

Major-league debut
- May 4, 1871, for the Cleveland Forest Citys

Last major-league appearance
- September 27, 1871, for the Cleveland Forest Citys

Major-league statistics
- Batting average: .191
- Home runs: 0
- RBIs: 9

Teams
- National Association of Base Ball Players Alert of Rochester (1869) Cleveland Forest Citys (1870) National Association of Professional BBP Cleveland Forest Citys (1871)

Eugene Boynton Kimball (August 31, 1850 – August 2, 1882) was an American professional baseball player. He most notably played for the Cleveland Forest Citys from 1870 to 1871.

Kimball was listed in the box score of the first professional baseball game in history, when his Cleveland Forest Citys took on the Fort Wayne Kekiongas in Fort Wayne on May 4, 1871. Kimball was involved in the first double play in professional league history when he hit a pop up to infielder Tom Carey. Teammate Deacon White couldn't get back to the base in time and was out when Carey touched the base.
