= Jim Carleton =

American baseball player (1848–1910)

- First baseman
- Born: August 20, 1848; Clinton, Connecticut
- Died: April 25, 1910 (aged 61); Detroit, Michigan
- Batted: Unknown Threw: Unknown

Major-league debut
- May 4, 1871, for the Cleveland Forest Citys

Last major-league appearance
- May 22, 1872, for the Cleveland Forest Citys

Major-league statistics
- Batting average: .267
- Hits: 165
- Triples: 44
- Stats at Baseball Reference

Teams
- National Association of Base Ball Players New York Mutuals (1869) Cleveland Forest Citys (1870) National Association of Professional BBP Cleveland Forest Citys (1871–1872)

James Leslie Carleton (August 20, 1848 – April 25, 1910) was an American professional baseball player for the Cleveland Forest Citys from 1871 to 1872.
