= Cleveland Forest City (1912) =

Baseball team in Cleveland, Ohio, US

Information
- League: United States Baseball League
- Location: Cleveland, Ohio
- Ballpark: National Association Grounds
- Founded: 1912
- Disbanded: 1912
- League championships: None
- Former name(s): Forest City (1912)
- Colors: Light-green
- Ownership: W.L. Murphy
- Manager: Jack O'Connor

Cleveland Forest City was a short-lived major-league franchise that collapsed after 1 month of play with the United States Baseball League in 1912. The Forest City were managed by Jack O'Connor and owned by W.L. Murphy.

== 1912 Standings ==
Team	Win	Loss	Pct
Pittsburgh Filipinos	19	7	.731
Richmond Rebels	15	11	.577
Reading (no name)	12	9	.571
Cincinnati Cams	12	10	.545
Washington Senators	6	7	.462
Chicago Green Sox	10	12	.455
Cleveland Forest City	8	13	.381
New York Knickerbockers	2	15	.118

The Forest City placed 7th in the one-year USBL at 8-13, only better than the New York Knickerbockers.

== Notable players ==
- Joe Delahanty
- Jerry Freeman
- Jack O'Connor
