= Caton, New York =

- Town
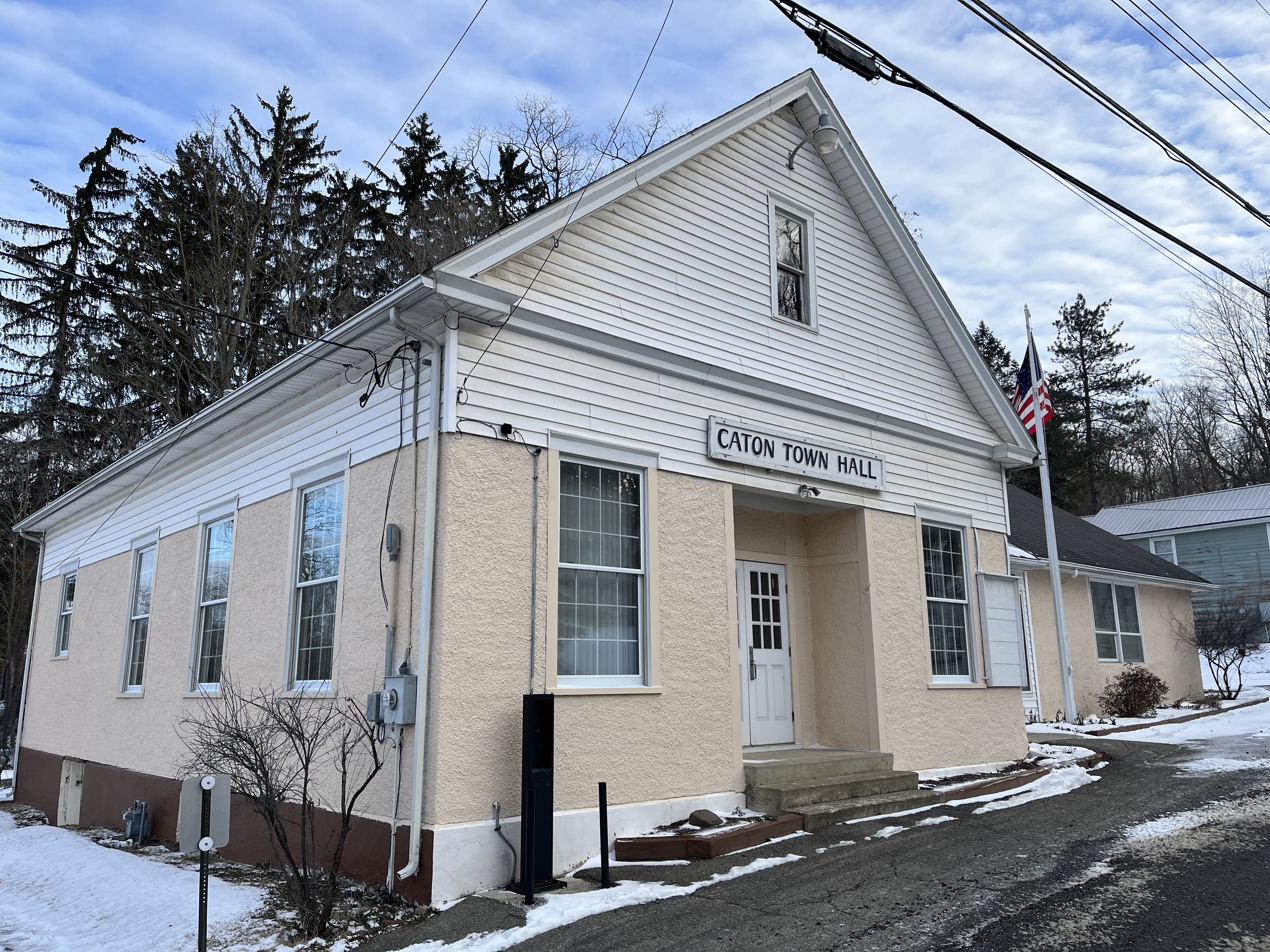
- Caton Town Hall

- Location within the state of New York
- Coordinates: 42°3′24″N 77°1′39″W
- Country: United States
- State: New York
- County: Steuben
- Established: 1839
- Named after: Richard Caton

Area
  - Total: 38.00 sq mi (98.42 km^{2})
  - Land: 37.56 sq mi (97.29 km^{2})
  - Water: 0.43 sq mi (1.12 km^{2})
- Elevation: 1,410 ft (430 m)

Population (2020)
  - Total: 2,046 ▼
  - Estimate (2021): 2,028
  - Density: 57.1/sq mi (22.06/km^{2})
- Time zone: UTC-5 (Eastern (EST))
  - Summer (DST): UTC-4 (EDT)
- ZIP Codes: 14830, 14858, 14871
- Area code: 607
- FIPS code: 36-12991
- GNIS feature ID: 0978802
- Website: www.townofcaton.gov/

Caton is a town in Steuben County, New York, United States. The population was 2,046 at the 2020 census. The town is named after Richard Caton.

The Town of Caton is in the southeast part of the county, south of Corning.

== History ==
Caton was formed in 1839, as the "Town of Wormley" from the Town of Corning (then known as the Town of Painted Post). In 1840, the town name was changed to "Caton" after an act to change it was passed. Caton also sent the most men to the Civil War than any other town in Steuben County. According to Pioneer History & Atlas of Steuben County, NY, the first electric chair was manufactured by George Davis in a chair factory in West Caton, though there no other sources confirming it.

== Geography ==
According to the United States Census Bureau, the town has a total area of 38.0 square miles (98 km^{2}), of which 37.8 square miles (98 km^{2}) is land and 0.2 square miles (0.52 km^{2}) (0.47%) is water.

The first permanent settler arrived circa 1819.

The southern town line is the border of Pennsylvania (Tioga County) and the eastern town boundary is the border of Chemung County (Town of Southport).

New York State Route 225 passes through the northeast of the town.

== Demographics ==
Historical population
Census	Pop.	Note	%±
1840	797		—
1850	1,214		52.3%
1860	1,550		27.7%
1870	1,544		−0.4%
1880	1,642		6.3%
1890	1,445		−12.0%
1900	1,345		−6.9%
1910	1,078		−19.9%
1920	688		−36.2%
1930	915		33.0%
1940	976		6.7%
1950	1,199		22.8%
1960	1,359		13.3%
1970	1,747		28.6%
1980	1,847		5.7%
1990	1,888		2.2%
2000	2,097		11.1%
2010	2,179		3.9%
2020	2,046		−6.1%
2021 (est.)	2,028		−0.9%
U.S. Decennial Census

As of the census of 2000, there were 2,097 people, 770 households, and 595 families residing in the town. The population density was 55.5 inhabitants per square mile (21.4/km^{2}). There were 819 housing units at an average density of 21.7 per square mile (8.4/km^{2}). The racial makeup of the town was 97.90% White, 1.00% African American, 0.29% Native American, 0.10% Asian, 0.24% from other races, and 0.48% from two or more races. Hispanic or Latino of any race were 0.72% of the population.

There were 770 households, out of which 35.1% had children under the age of 18 living with them, 63.0% were married couples living together, 7.5% had a female householder with no husband present, and 22.6% were non-families. 17.1% of all households were made up of individuals, and 6.5% had someone living alone who was 65 years of age or older. The average household size was 2.72 and the average family size was 3.03.

In the town, the population was spread out, with 27.3% under the age of 18, 7.0% from 18 to 24, 29.0% from 25 to 44, 27.6% from 45 to 64, and 9.1% who were 65 years of age or older. The median age was 37 years. For every 100 females, there were 100.1 males. For every 100 females age 18 and over, there were 101.9 males.

The median income for a household in the town was $45,875, and the median income for a family was $50,052. Males had a median income of $33,594 versus $27,391 for females. The per capita income for the town was $19,612. About 6.1% of families and 7.5% of the population were below the poverty line, including 8.5% of those under age 18 and 4.8% of those age 65 or over.

The 1890 population was 1,445.

== Communities and locations in the Town of Caton ==
- Brownstown – A hamlet in the southwest part of the town. (see below)
- Caton – The hamlet of Caton is on NY-225 at the junction of County Roads 32 and 120.
- Caton Creek – A stream flowing northward past Caton village.
- West Caton – A hamlet in the northwest part of the town.

The hamlet of Brownstown is also listed as "Browntown" in the official New York State Gazetteer, maintained and published by the New York State Department of Health, which includes numerous defunct hamlets and towns, some with alternate or archaic spellings.

== Notable people ==
- Deacon White, born in Caton, Major League Baseball manager and Baseball Hall of Fame player. White was the first batter to come to the plate in the National Association.
- Elmer White, born in Caton, Major League Baseball Catcher. Elmer was the first recorded professional baseball player to die.
- Will White, born in Caton, Major League Baseball pitcher, brother of Deacon White.
- Lucien Grant Berry, Brigadier General who served in 3 wars. Born in Caton in 1863.
