= Ezra Sutton =

American baseball player (1849–1907)

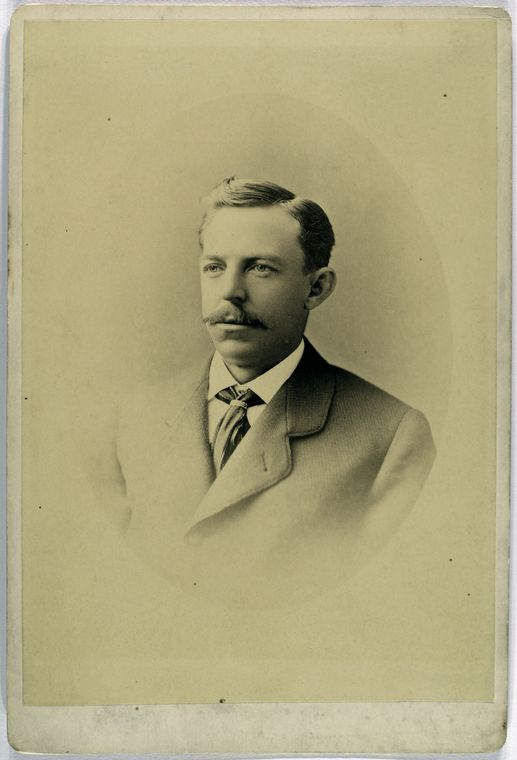
- Third baseman / Shortstop
- Born: September 17, 1849; Seneca Falls, New York, U.S.
- Died: June 20, 1907 (aged 57); Braintree, Massachusetts, U.S.
- Batted: Right Threw: Right

MLB debut
- May 4, 1871, for the Cleveland Forest Citys

Last MLB appearance
- June 20, 1888, for the Boston Beaneaters

MLB statistics
- Batting average: .294
- Hits: 1,574
- Home runs: 25
- Runs batted in: 672
- Stats at Baseball Reference

Teams
- National Association of Base Ball Players Alert of Rochester (1869) Cleveland Forest Citys (1870) League player Cleveland Forest Citys (1871–1872) Philadelphia Athletics (1873–1876) Boston Red Caps/Beaneaters (1877–1888)

Ezra Ballou Sutton (September 17, 1849 – June 20, 1907) was an American third baseman in the National Association and Major League Baseball from 1871 to 1888. Sutton collected 1,574 hits during this time period; he had a lifetime batting average of .294. Like many players in an era when walks were more rare, Sutton did not walk a lot, only drawing 169 walks in more than 5,500 plate appearances. By almost all measures, Sutton had his two best seasons in 1883 and 1884 – he collected 203 runs and 296 hits during those seasons. On May 8, 1871, Sutton hit the first home run in professional baseball history for the Cleveland Forest Citys against the Chicago White Stockings. He would go on to hit another home run later in the game but Cleveland still lost the game 14–12.

The Seneca Falls, New York born Sutton came to the Cleveland Forest Citys in 1870 from the Alert club of Rochester, New York (who had played the Forest Citys twice in 1869), and then joined the Philadelphia Athletics in 1873 after the Cleveland club failed. As third baseman for each he had the unique distinction of playing in both the first National Association game on May 4, 1871 and the first National League game on April 22, 1876. But his main team was the Boston Red Caps (later redubbed the "Beaneaters") where he won pennants in 1877, 1878, and 1883. After the National League's formation in 1876, he was one of the first several players to collect 1,000 hits in the major leagues.

Sutton died at a private hospital in Braintree, Massachusetts.
