= National Association Grounds =

Baseball grounds in Cleveland, Ohio

Coordinates: 41°29′47″N 81°39′8″W

National Association Grounds was a baseball grounds in Cleveland, Ohio, located at Central Avenue and East 55th Street. It was home to the Cleveland Forest Citys of the National Association in 1871 and 1872, with Cleveland winning five of its sixteen home games. It is considered a major league ballpark by those who count the National Association as a major league.

After many years of use as an amateur baseball field, a new team dubbed Cleveland Forest City moved to the NA Grounds, as members of the short-lived United States Baseball League in 1912. The USBL lasted barely a month before disbanding.
