= William Johnson (baseball) =

American baseball player (1848–1909)

- Second baseman
- Born: June 1, 1848; Parma, Ohio
- Died: September 25, 1909 (aged 61); Albuquerque, New Mexico
- Batted: Unknown Threw: Unknown

MLB debut
- May 20, 1871, for the Cleveland Forest Citys

Last MLB appearance
- September 12, 1871, for the Cleveland Forest Citys

MLB statistics
- Batting average: .224
- Home runs: 0
- RBIs: 7
- Stats at Baseball Reference

Teams
- Cleveland Forest Citys (1871)

William Penn Johnson (June 1, 1848 – September 25, 1909) was an American professional baseball player for the Cleveland Forest Citys during the 1871 season. Long identified as "Caleb Johnson", the player's true identity was uncovered in 2015 by Society for American Baseball Research member Peter Morris.
