= George Ewell =

American baseball player (1850–1910)

- Right fielder
- Born: October 29, 1850; Philadelphia, Pennsylvania
- Died: October 20, 1910 (aged 59); Philadelphia, Pennsylvania
- Batted: Unknown Threw: Unknown

MLB debut
- June 26, 1871, for the Cleveland Forest Citys

Last MLB appearance
- June 26, 1871, for the Cleveland Forest Citys

MLB statistics
- Games played: 1
- At bats: 3
- Hits: 0
- Stats at Baseball Reference

Teams
- Cleveland Forest Citys (1871)

George W. Ewell (October 29, 1850 – October 20, 1910) was an American professional baseball player. He appeared in one game for the Cleveland Forest Citys in 1871.

Ewell was born and died in Philadelphia, Pennsylvania, and is interred at Mount Moriah Cemetery.
