= Charlie Pabor =

American baseball player and manager (1846–1913)

- Left fielder / Pitcher / Manager
- Born: September 24, 1846; Brooklyn, New York, U.S.
- Died: April 23, 1913 (aged 66); New Haven, Connecticut, U.S.
- Batted: Left Threw: Left

MLB debut
- May 4, 1871, for the Cleveland Forest Citys

Last MLB appearance
- October 28, 1875, for the New Haven Elm Citys

MLB statistics
- Batting average: .285
- Home runs: 0
- Runs batted in: 80
- Pitching win–loss record: 1–4
- Earned run average: 5.96
- Strikeouts: 0
- Managerial record: 13–64
- Managerial W%: .169
- Stats at Baseball Reference

Teams
- As player Union of Morrisania (1865–1870) Cleveland Forest Citys (1871–1872) Brooklyn Atlantics (1873) Philadelphia White Stockings (1874) Brooklyn Atlantics (1875) New Haven Elm Citys (1875) As manager Cleveland Forest Citys (1871) Brooklyn Atlantics (1875) New Haven Elm Citys (1875)

Charles Henry Pabor (September 24, 1846 – April 23, 1913), also spelled Charley, nicknamed "the Old Woman in the Red Cap", was an American baseball left fielder, pitcher, and manager throughout the existence of the National Association of Professional Base Ball Players (1871–1875).

== Early life and career ==
Born in Brooklyn, New York, Pabor played baseball in and around New York City until he joined the Cleveland Forest Citys of the National Association as a left fielder and manager. On May 4, 1871, Pabor managed and played while batting 0-4 in the first game of the season, which is considered the first all professional game ever played, a game between his Forest Citys and the Fort Wayne Kekiongas. Cleveland finished 8th that season, and Pabor was replaced as manager in 1872. He had hit well in 1871, with a .296 batting average, but it dropped to .207 in 1872.

The Cleveland team folded after the season, and Pabor got a fresh start with the Brooklyn Atlantics. He had his best season that year, hitting .360 with 41 runs batted in. After a short season in 1874 with the Philadelphia White Stockings in which he only played in 17 games, he returned to the Atlantics for the 1875 season as the player-manager. The season was a disaster, as the Atlantics only won two of their 44 games. Pabor did not finish the year in Brooklyn, as he signed with the New Haven Elm Citys toward the end of the 1875 season, playing and managing six games and winning only one. Although his record of 13-64 as manager is not prolific, he is credited as starting the careers of both King Kelly and Fred Goldsmith.

Pabor also umpired three games in 1875, all involving Connecticut-based teams.

== Post-career ==
After the end of the 1875 season and the demise of the National Association, Pabor quit baseball altogether, staying in New Haven, Connecticut. He joined the New Haven Police Department, where he enjoyed a long career. Pabor died in New Haven of pneumonia at the age of 66, and he is interred at Mapledale Cemetery.
