= Art Allison =

American baseball player (1849–1916)

- Outfielder
- Born: January 29, 1849; Philadelphia, Pennsylvania, US
- Died: February 25, 1916 (aged 67); Washington, D.C., US
- Batted: Unknown Threw: Unknown

MLB debut
- May 4, 1871, for the Cleveland Forest Citys

Last MLB appearance
- October 5, 1876, for the Louisville Grays

MLB statistics
- Batting Average: .254
- Hits: 188
- Runs Batted In: 70
- Stats at Baseball Reference

Teams
- National Association of Base Ball Players Geary of Philadelphia (1868) Cleveland Forest Citys (1869–1870) National Association of Professional BBP Cleveland Forest Citys (1871–1872) Elizabeth Resolutes (1873) Washington Nationals (1875) Hartford Dark Blues (1875) Louisville Grays (1876)

Arthur Algernon Allison (January 29, 1849 – February 25, 1916) was an American Major League Baseball player from 1871 to 1876, who played his career primarily as an outfielder. He is known for playing in the first professional baseball game on May 4, 1871 between the Cleveland Forest Citys and the Fort Wayne Kekiongas, as Cleveland's Center Fielder.

== Biography ==
Allison is also known as being the first ever strikeout recorded in major league history. Allison had a peak year during the 1873 season whilst playing for the Elizabeth Resolutes, where he had a career-high batting average of .320. Despite Allison having the second highest batting average of the 1873 season, the Resolutes as a team would place second to last in the National Association. After his baseball career, Arthur worked as a printer and resided in Washington D.C. for over 20 years until he died on February 25, 1916, after a fatal accident caused by colliding with a truck due to snowy weather while heading to work.
