= Al Pratt (baseball) =

American baseball player and manager (1847–1937)

- Pitcher / Outfielder
- Born: November 19, 1847; Pittsburgh, Pennsylvania, U.S.
- Died: November 21, 1937 (aged 90); Pittsburgh, Pennsylvania, U.S.
- Batted: Unknown Threw: Right

MLB debut
- May 4, 1871, for the Cleveland Forest Citys

Last MLB appearance
- August 19, 1872, for the Cleveland Forest Citys

MLB statistics
- Win–loss record: 12–26
- Earned run average: 4.41
- Strikeouts: 41
- Stats at Baseball Reference
- Managerial record at Baseball Reference

Teams
- National Association of Base Ball Players Riverside of Portsmouth, Ohio (1868) Cleveland Forest Citys (1869–1870) League player Cleveland Forest Citys (1871–1872) League manager Pittsburgh Alleghenys (1882–1883)

Albert G. Pratt (November 19, 1847 – November 21, 1937), nicknamed "Uncle Al", was an American right-handed pitcher and outfielder in the National Association for the Cleveland Forest Citys, and was a manager in Major League Baseball with the Pittsburgh Alleghenys of the American Association.

A native of Pittsburgh, Pennsylvania, Pratt was a Civil War veteran and baseball player. Pratt was 5'7", 140 lbs., and compiled a 12–26 record in 43 professional games as a hurler. In successive years with Cleveland, 1871–1872, Pratt hit .262 and .277 in 45 games with a total of 52 hits.

Pratt managed the Portsmouth, Ohio baseball team in 1868. Afterward he was a member of the Forest City Club of Cleveland in the National Association. This was the first professional league in America.

In 1880 Pratt founded the first major league club in Pittsburgh, the Alleghenys (later renamed the Pittsburgh Pirates), which joined the American Association.

Pratt celebrated his 90th birthday two days before his death in Pittsburgh on November 21, 1937. He was buried, according to his request, attired in his Grand Army of the Republic uniform.
