= Deacon White =

American baseball player and manager (1847–1939)

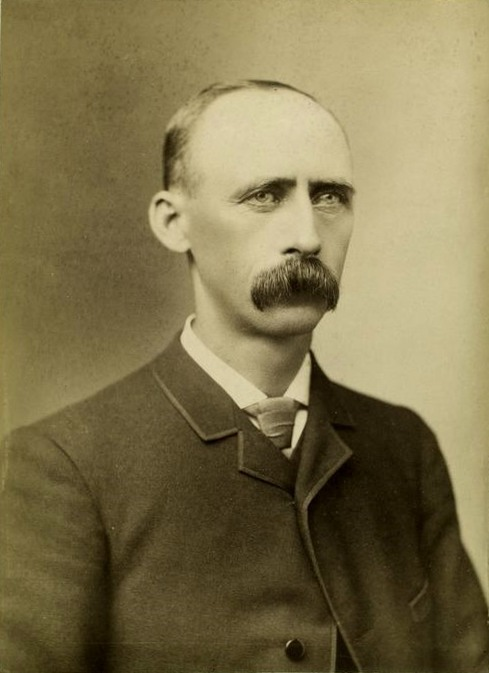
- White in 1888
- Third baseman / Catcher
- Born: December 2, 1847; Caton, New York, U.S.
- Died: July 7, 1939 (aged 91); St. Charles Township, Illinois, U.S.
- Batted: Left Threw: Right

Major-league debut
- May 4, 1871, for the Cleveland Forest Citys

Last major-league appearance
- October 4, 1890, for the Buffalo Bisons

Major-league statistics
- Batting average: .312
- Hits: 2,067
- Home runs: 24
- Runs batted in: 988
- Stats at Baseball Reference

Teams
- As player Cleveland Forest Citys (1871–1872) Boston Red Stocking (1873–1875) Chicago White Stockings (1876) Boston Red Stockings (1877) Cincinnati Reds (1878–1879) Cincinnati Stars (1880) Buffalo Bisons (1881–1885) Detroit Wolverines (1886–1888) Pittsburgh Pirates (1889) Buffalo Bisons (1890) As manager Cleveland Forest Citys (1872) Cincinnati Reds (1879)

Career highlights and awards
- NL batting champion (1877); 2× NL RBI leader (1876, 1877)

Member of the National

Baseball Hall of Fame
- Induction: 2013
- Vote: 87.5%
- Election method: Pre-Integration Era Committee

James Laurie "Deacon" White (December 2, 1847 – July 7, 1939) was an American baseball player who was one of the principal stars during the first two decades of the sport's professional era. The outstanding catcher of the 1870s during baseball's barehanded period, he caught more games than any other player during the decade, and was a major figure on five consecutive championship teams from 1873 to 1877 – three in the National Association (NA), in which he played throughout its five-year existence from 1871 to 1875, and two in the National League (NL), which was formed as the first fully recognized major league in 1876, partially as a result of White and three other stars moving from the powerhouse Boston Red Stockings to the Chicago White Stockings. Although he was already 28 when the NL was established, White played 15 seasons in the major leagues, completing a 23-year career at the top levels of the sport.

In 1871, White was the first batter to come to the plate in the National Association, the first professional baseball league. After compiling a .347 batting average over five NA seasons, he led the NL in runs batted in (RBI) in its first two seasons of play, and also led the league in batting (.387), slugging average, hits, triples and total bases in a brief shift to first base in 1877. For three years afterward, he joined his younger brother Will, a successful pitcher, with the Cincinnati Reds and Cincinnati Stars. In his mid-30s he became an effective third baseman when the toil of catching had become too great, and was a major force on the championship Detroit Wolverines team of 1887, batting .303 at age 39. Over the 20-year period of his career, White batted .312 and had more RBI (988) than any player except Cap Anson. Upon his retirement, he was among baseball's all-time leaders in career games, at bats, hits and total bases. He ranked fourth in career total chances at third base, fifth in assists, and sixth in putouts and double plays. White was inducted into the National Baseball Hall of Fame in 2013. He holds the record with Dan Brouthers for most franchises played for (10) by a Hall-of-Famer.

== Early life ==
White was born in Caton, New York, the son of farmer Lester S. White (born c. 1820) and his wife Adeline (born c. 1823). The couple had at least eight children: Oscar Leroy (born c. 1844), James, Elmer Melville (born c. 1851), William (1854 – 1911), Phebe Davis (born c. 1856), Estelle (born c. 1858), George (c. 1862 – after 1939) and Hattie (born c. 1867); they also adopted a girl named Phebe Maynard (born c. 1876) when they were in their fifties. His cousin Elmer White also played baseball professionally as James' teammate in 1871; in March 1872, Elmer was the first recorded professional baseball player to die.

== Baseball career ==
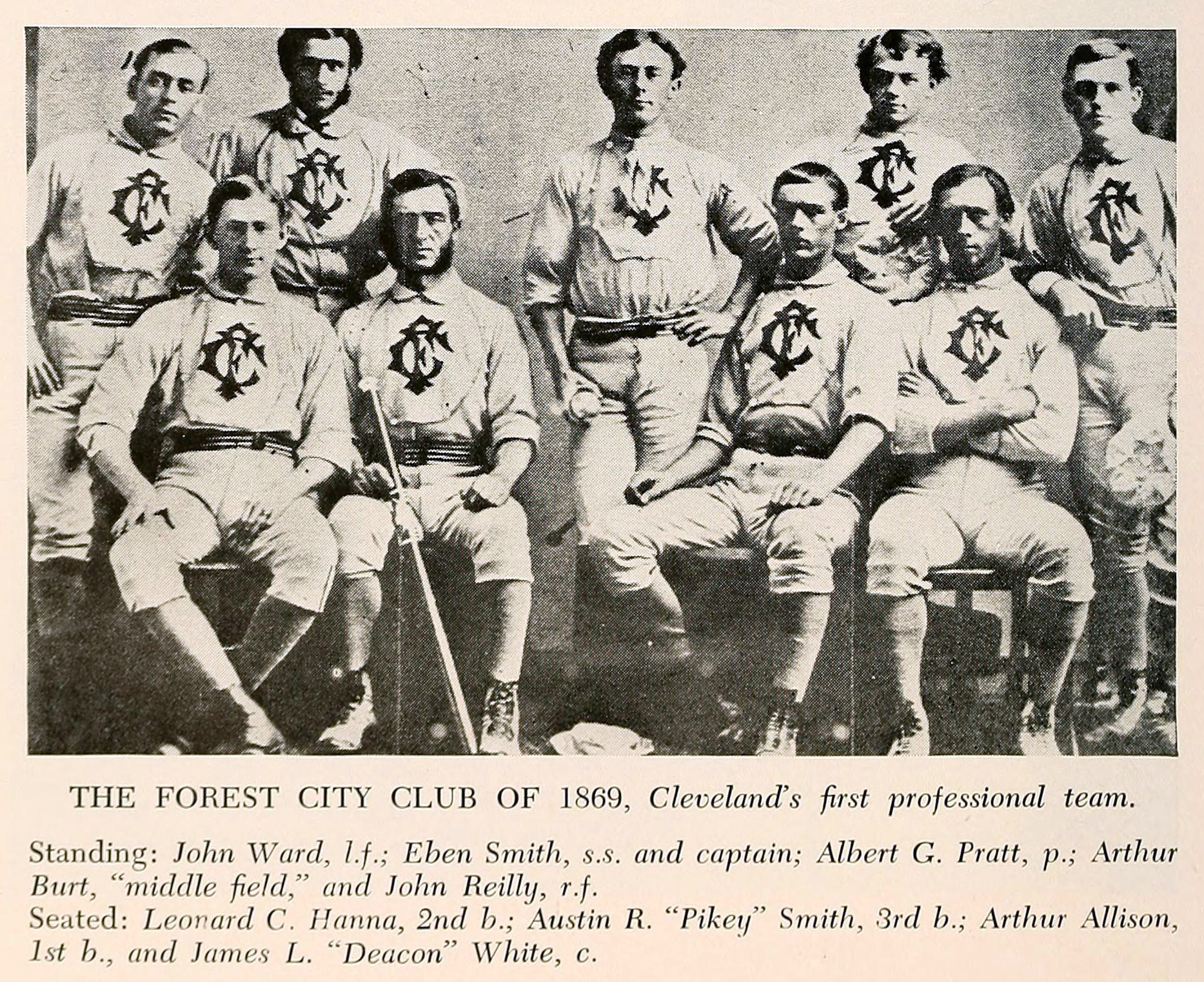
White (bottom right) on the 1869 Forest City Club of Cleveland.

White learned baseball from a Union soldier who returned to his hometown after the Civil War in 1865. His pro career began in 1868 with the Cleveland Forest Citys club, at a time when no team was entirely composed of professional players. He earned the first hit in baseball's first fully professional league – a double off Bobby Mathews of the Fort Wayne Kekiongas in the first inning of the first game in National Association history on May 4, 1871; he also made the first catch. His long career allowed him to play with many of the legendary figures of 19th-century professional baseball; White played on the great National Association Boston Red Stockings teams of the early 1870s, and also played with Cap Anson and Al Spalding in Chicago, King Kelly in Cincinnati, Dan Brouthers in Buffalo, and Ned Hanlon and Sam Thompson in Detroit, as well as Jake Beckley and Pud Galvin in Pittsburgh.

White led his league in batting average twice (including the NA in 1875), and in RBI three times (including the NA in 1873); not until 1953, when Roy Campanella topped the NL, would another catcher lead his league in RBI. White started out early enough to have played against the undefeated Cincinnati Red Stockings of 1869, baseball's first all-professional team. He was considered the best barehanded catcher of his time, as well as one of the best third baseman during the second half of his career; his combined total of games caught in the NA and NL was eventually passed by Pop Snyder in 1881. On May 16, 1884 White recorded 11 assists at third base, which remains the major league record for a nine-inning game although eight other players have since tied the mark. In the rough-and-tumble 19th-century baseball era, White was a nonsmoking, Bible-toting, church-going deacon.

In 1889, the contracts of White and teammate Jack Rowe were sold to the Pittsburgh Alleghenys, but the pair refused to report unless they were paid additional money, leading to a protracted dispute. Eventually the two men were paid, with White telling a reporter, "We appreciate the money, but we ain't worth it. Rowe's arm is gone. I'm over 40 and my fielding ain't so good, though I can still hit some. But I will say this. No man is going to sell my carcass unless I get half." Complaints like this were part of the reason that the Players' League was formed in 1890.

According to historian Lee Allen in The National League Story (1961), White believed that the earth is flat. He tried and failed to convince his teammates that they were living on a flat plane and not a globe; they ridiculed him. Then one asked to be convinced, and the Deacon gave him an argument suited to the hypothesis that the earth is not really turning. This argument convinced the teammate.

White's playing career ended after the 1890 season. Over the 20-year period from 1871 to 1890, White batted .312 and had more RBI (988) than any player except Cap Anson, and also ranked fourth in career games (1,560), at bats (6,624), hits (2,067) and total bases (2,595). He also ended his career ranking fourth in major league history in games (826) and total chances (3,016) at third base, fifth in assists (1,618), and sixth in putouts (954) and double plays (118).

White managed the minor league club Elmira Gladiators of the New York–Pennsylvania League in 1891. He has been incorrectly credited with managing the McAlester Miners of the Oklahoma–Arkansas–Kansas League (1907) and the Tulsa Oilers of the Oklahoma–Kansas League (1908). Both teams were actually managed by Harry B. "Deacon" White.

== Family and later life ==
White married Marium Van Arsdale (born 1851 in Moravia, New York) on April 24, 1871. For much of his career, they lived on his farm in Corning, New York; they moved to Buffalo after he joined the Bisons in 1881. Their only child, Grace Hughson White, was born in Buffalo on September 8, 1882. The family moved to Detroit when White began playing for the Wolverines, but soon returned to Buffalo; by 1900 he was operating a successful livery stable there.

Sometime after 1900, the Whites sent Grace to Mendota College in Mendota, Illinois, beginning a family association with the Advent Christian school which would endure across multiple generations. By 1909, James and Marium had also moved to Mendota, where they became the head residents at Maple Hall, the young ladies' dormitory, until 1912. On August 15, 1912, Grace married fellow Mendota alumnus Roger A. Watkins at the dormitory; that year, the college had relocated fifty miles to the east, becoming Aurora College. Marium died on April 30, 1914, in Mendota; one of Aurora's students recalled of "Ma" White: "She was of a cheery disposition, with a word and a smile for all; mingling with the girls as one of us; giving kindly counsel and encouragement. Her interest in each girl is expressed in her own words: 'I am only doing what I would like to have some one else do for my girl, if she were away from home.' Words cannot express our appreciation of such kind and personal interest." Roger and Grace Watkins continued to be involved with the college, and moved to Aurora in 1920; in 1927 Roger joined the college's board of directors, serving until 1971, all but the first two years also as the board's secretary. By 1930 Deacon White had remarried, and with his wife Alice moved into the Watkins home at 221 Calumet Avenue, next door to the college president.

White died at age 91 in the early morning of July 7, 1939, at the Watkins' summer cottage at Rude Camp, the college's retreat on the Fox River in St. Charles Township; having been in good health, his death was attributed to a disastrous heat wave. He had been scheduled to be the principal guest of honor at Aurora's celebration of baseball's centennial the following day; the festivities instead featured a tribute to his memory. White had been greatly disappointed over not having been invited to the opening ceremonies to the Baseball Hall of Fame that summer, having been completely overlooked in the voting for inductees. His funeral was held at Aurora's Healy Chapel, and he was buried at Restland Cemetery in Mendota. He was survived by his second wife Alice, who had been staying in Winston-Salem, North Carolina, at the time of his death, by his younger brother George, and by his daughter Grace (1882–1956) and her husband Roger (1888–1977).

== Hall of Fame ==
In August 2008, White was named as one of ten former players who began their careers before 1943 to be considered by the Veterans Committee for induction into the National Baseball Hall of Fame in 2009; although he fell short in final voting, he received the most votes of any player whose career ended before 1940. In 2010, the Nineteenth Century Committee of the Society for American Baseball Research named White the year's Overlooked 19th Century Baseball Legend — a 19th-century player, manager, executive or other baseball personality not yet inducted into the Hall of Fame.

On December 3, 2012, the National Baseball Hall of Fame announced that he was elected to the Hall of Fame by the new Pre-Integration Era Committee (pre-1947 era), receiving 14 out of 16 votes; he and two others elected by the Committee were inducted on July 28, 2013, with his acceptance speech given by his great-grandson Jerry Watkins, the son of White's grandson Daniel. With over 166 years between his birth and date of induction (and nearly three-quarters of a century after his death), White is the "oldest" person ever inducted into the Baseball Hall of Fame.

== See also ==
- List of Major League Baseball progressive career hits leaders
- List of Major League Baseball career hits leaders
- List of Major League Baseball progressive career home runs leaders
- List of Major League Baseball career runs scored leaders
- List of Major League Baseball batting champions
- List of Major League Baseball annual runs batted in leaders
- List of Major League Baseball annual triples leaders
- List of Major League Baseball player-managers

Preceded by Cal McVey	Cincinnati Reds (1876–1880) Managers; 1879	Succeeded by John Clapp
