= 1872 in baseball =

The following are the baseball events of the year 1872 throughout the world.

== Champions ==
- National Association: Boston

== Statistical leaders ==
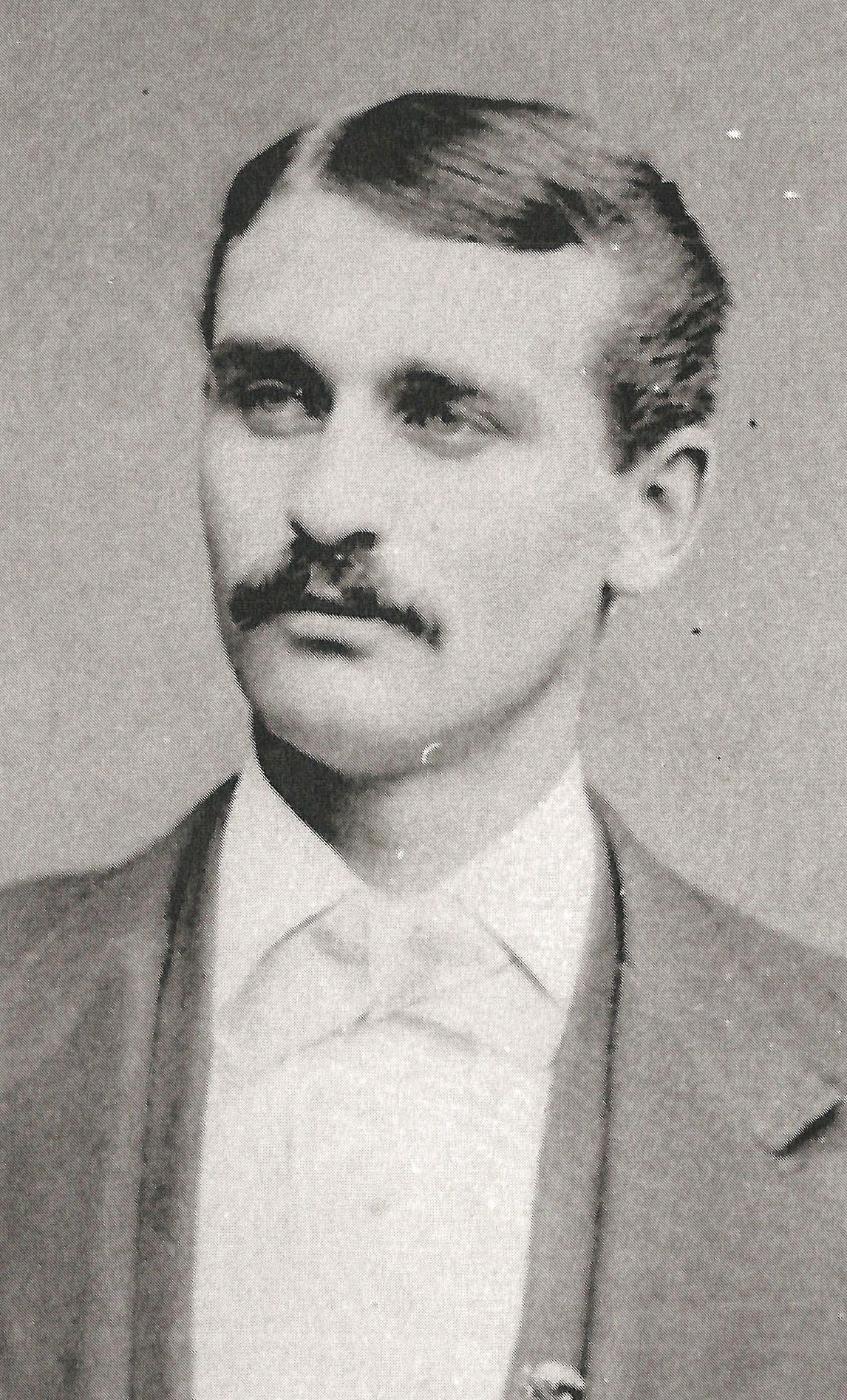
Ross Barnes in 1872

National Association
Stat	Player	Total
AVG	Ross Barnes (BOS)	.430
HR	Lip Pike (BAL)	7
RBI	Lip Pike (BAL)	60
W	Al Spalding (BOS)	38
ERA	Cherokee Fisher (BAL)	1.80
K	Bobby Mathews (BAL)	57

== National Association final standings ==
Pos	Team	Pld	W	L	T	RF	RA	RD	GB
1	Boston Red Stockings (C)	48	39	8	1	521	236	+285	—
2	Baltimore Canaries	58	35	19	4	617	434	+183	7.5
3	New York Mutuals	56	34	20	2	523	362	+161	8.5
4	Philadelphia Athletics	47	30	14	3	539	349	+190	7.5
5	Troy Haymakers	25	15	10	0	273	191	+82	13
6	Brooklyn Atlantics	37	9	28	0	237	473	−236	25
7	Cleveland Forest Citys	22	6	16	0	174	254	−80	20.5
8	Middletown Mansfields	24	5	19	0	220	348	−128	22.5
9	Brooklyn Eckfords	29	3	26	0	152	413	−261	27
10	Washington Olympics	9	2	7	0	54	140	−86	18
11	Washington Nationals	11	0	11	0	80	190	−110	21

Source: Baseball Reference
(C) Champions

== Notable seasons ==
- Boston Red Stockings pitcher Al Spalding has a record of 38–8 in 404.2 innings pitched and leads the NA in wins. He has a 1.85 earned run average and a 196 ERA+. At the plate, Spalding has a batting average of .354 and an OPS+ of 144.
- Boston Red Stockings second baseman Ross Barnes, in 45 games played, leads the NA with 99 hits, a .430 batting average, a 1.034 OPS, and a 211 OPS+. He has 81 runs scored and 44 runs batted in.

== Events ==
=== January–March ===
- March 4 – At its annual convention being held in Cleveland, the NA adopts a rule change to allow the use of the wrist in the pitching delivery.

=== April–June ===
- April 22 – Candy Cummings makes his debut with Mutual of New York.
- April 26 – "Orator" Jim O'Rourke makes his debut with the Mansfield club of Middletown.
- May 24 – The Olympic Club of Washington play their last game before dropping out of the NA. Poor talent and financial difficulties combine to do in the Olympics.
- May 29 – Despite not having a team in the league in 1872, the city of Chicago hosts its first NA game since the Great Chicago Fire as Lord Baltimore defeats Forest City in front of 4,000 fans.
- June 26 – The National B.B.C. of Washington, with an 0–11 record, disbands after losing 9–1 to Lord Baltimore.

=== July–September ===
- July 6 – Sporting a 22–1 record, Harry Wright takes the Boston club on vacation to an island in Boston Harbor.
- July 9 – Eckford of Brooklyn commit 13 errors in their 15–3 loss to Union of Troy. It is the fewest errors committed by the 0–11 Eckfords in a game thus far this season.
- July 23 – Despite a winning record, the Union Club of Troy disbands due to financial problems. Half of the "Haymakers'" roster will move to Eckford of Brooklyn, which saves them from dropping out of the NA.
- July 26 – In an emergency meeting, the NA revises their scheduling requirements from 5 to 9 games versus each opponent competing for the championship. This is in response to the number of teams that have disbanded and comes 3 days after the first-division Union of Troy had called it quits.
- August 13 – The Mansfield Club of Middletown, CT announce that they have disbanded and drop out of the NA.
- August 19 – Forest City of Cleveland disband the club after a loss to Boston. This drops the number of teams still playing in the NA to 6.
- September 1 – Al Thake, left-fielder batting .295 for Atlantic, drowns in New York harbor after falling from a fishing boat. Thake is the first active major league ballplayer to die during a season. (Elmer White, active in 1871, had died in the previous offseason.)

=== October–December ===
- October 22 – The Boston Red Stockings clinch the pennant with a 4–3 win over the Brooklyn Eckfords.

== Births ==
- January 12 – Togie Pittinger
- February 3 – Lou Criger
- March 3 – Willie Keeler
- March 24 – Kip Selbach
- May 10 – Klondike Douglass
- May 14 – John Wood
- May 16 – John O'Connell
- May 23 – Deacon Phillippe
- June 14 – Doc Parker
- August 6 – Sam Mertes
- August 15 – Silk O'Loughlin
- August 15 – John Warner
- August 18 – Eddie Hickey
- September 5 – Al Orth
- September 18 – Lord Byron
- September 20 – Joe Berry
- September 25 – Fred Odwell
- October 3 – Fred Clarke
- October 6 – Jack Dunn
- December 5 – Pink Hawley
- December 9 – Cy Seymour
- December 25 – Ted Lewis

== Deaths ==
Abbreviations
Date	Individual's death date
Name	Individual's name
Age	Age at death
Cause	Cause of death
Cemetery	Place individual is interred
City/State	City and state of burial
Seasons	Seasons in which individual appeared
Teams	Teams the individual played for or managed

Date	Name	Age	Cause	Cemetery	City/State	Seasons	Teams	Ref
March 17	Elmer White	21	Tuberculosis	Elmwood Cemetery	Caton, New York	1871	Cleveland Forest Citys	
September 1	Al Thake	22	Drowning	Green-Wood Cemetery	Brooklyn, New York	1872	Brooklyn Atlantics	
