= Cleveland Forest Citys =

Defunct American baseball team

Information
- Location: Based in Cleveland, Ohio
- Founded: 1868
- Folded: 1872
- Nickname: Forest City
- Former leagues: National Association (1871-1872); National Amateur Association (1868-1870)
- Former ballpark: National Association Grounds
- Manager: Scott Hastings and Deacon White (1872); Charlie Pabor (1871)

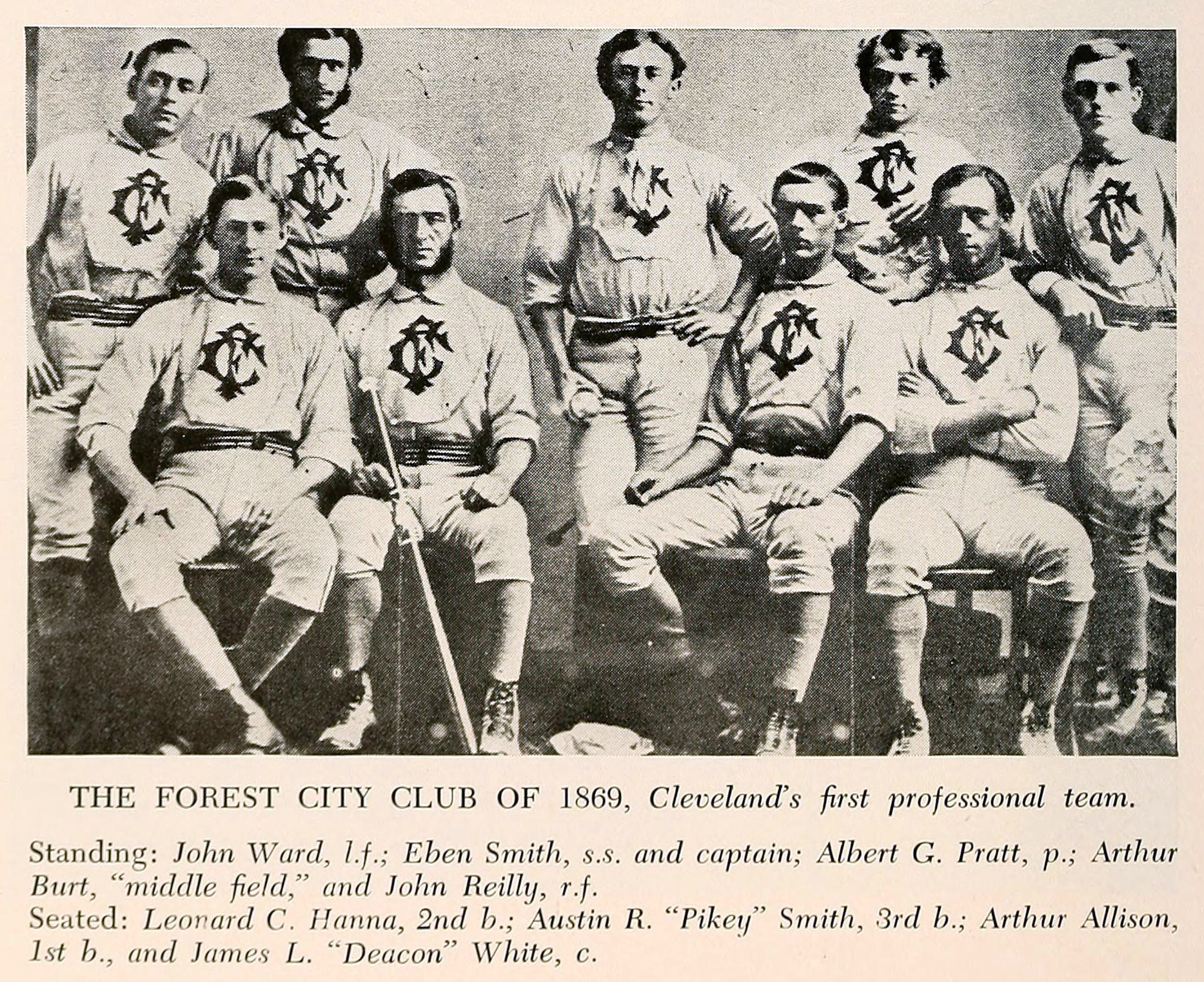

The Forest Citys were a short lived professional baseball team based in Cleveland in the early 1870s. The actual name of the team, as shown in standings, was Forest City, not "Cleveland". The name "Forest Citys" was used in the same generic style of the day in which the team from Chicago was called the "Chicagos". Modern writers often refer to the club as the "Cleveland Forest Citys", which does not reflect 1870s usage, but does distinguish the team from the Rockford, Illinois, professional team that was also called "Forest City", that being a long-standing nickname of both of those cities.

Professional baseball began in Cleveland in 1869, following the lead of the first openly professional team, the Cincinnati Red Stockings, on the other side of Ohio. The Forest City club was the first fully salaried Cleveland team, beginning in 1870 as an independent. The club played against amateur, semipro, and professional teams, including the racially integrated Resolutes Club from Oberlin College.

In 1871 the Forest Citys joined the first professional league, the National Association.

The Forest Citys' home games were played at the National Association Grounds in Cleveland. Forest City played in the first National Association game, as the visiting team against the Kekionga club of Fort Wayne, Indiana. They were shut out by a score of 0-2.

The Forest City club's record over its two seasons was poor, winning 16 and losing 35. The small quantity of games was typical in the early years, when teams often played only once a week. The team folded after the 1872 season.

== See also ==
- 1871 Cleveland Forest Citys season
- 1872 Cleveland Forest Citys season
- Cleveland Forest Citys all-time roster
