= List of 19th-century baseball players =

This is a list of 19th-century baseball players who have a biographic article.

== A ==
- John Abadie
- Ed Abbaticchio
- Bert Abbey
- Charlie Abbey
- Dan Abbott
- Frank Abercrombie
- Doc Adams
- George Adams
- Jim Adams
- Bob Addy
- Bill Ahearn
- John Ake
- Gus Alberts
- Nin Alexander
- Bob Allen
- Ham Allen
- Hezekiah Allen
- Jack Allen
- Myron Allen
- Pete Allen
- Andy Allison
- Art Allison
- Bill Allison
- Doug Allison
- Nick Altrock
- Billy Alvord
- Doc Amole
- Bill Anderson
- Dave Anderson
- John Anderson
- Varney Anderson
- Ed Andrews
- Jim Andrews
- Wally Andrews
- Fred Andrus
- Wiman Andrus
- Bill Annis
- Cap Anson
- Joe Ardner
- Robert Armstrong
- Billy Arnold
- Harry Arundel
- Tug Arundel
- Charlie Atherton
- Al Atkinson
- Ed Atkinson
- Harry Atkinson
- Henry Austin
- Jake Aydelott

== B ==
- Ed Bagley
- Gene Bagley
- Frank Bahret
- Harvey Bailey
- King Bailey
- Charlie Baker
- George Baker
- Kirtley Baker
- Norm Baker
- Phil Baker
- Jersey Bakley
- Kid Baldwin
- Lady Baldwin
- Mark Baldwin
- Art Ball
- Studs Bancker
- Jim Banning
- Jimmy Bannon
- Tom Bannon
- Charlie Barber
- Al Barker
- Sam Barkley
- Tom Barlow
- Bill Barnes
- Ross Barnes
- Billy Barnie
- Bob Barr
- Bill Barrett
- Jimmy Barrett
- John Barrett
- Marty Barrett
- Frank Barrows
- Shad Barry
- Charlie Bartson
- John Bass
- Charley Bassett
- Charlie Bastian
- Frank Bates
- John Bates
- Larry Battam
- Joe Battin
- Al Bauer
- George Bausewine
- Burley Bayer
- Jack Beach
- Dave Beadle
- Tommy Beals
- Alex Beam
- Ernie Beam
- Ollie Beard
- Ed Beatin
- Ginger Beaumont
- Edward Beavens
- Buck Becannon
- George Bechtel
- Erve Beck
- Frank Beck
- Bob Becker
- Jake Beckley
- Ed Beecher
- Steve Behel
- Ira Belden
- Charlie Bell
- Frank Bell
- Steve Bellán
- Jack Bellman
- Art Benedict
- Ike Benners
- Charlie Bennett
- Cy Bentley
- Marty Bergen
- Tun Berger
- John Bergh
- Frank Berkelbach
- Nate Berkenstock
- Curt Bernard
- Bill Bernhard
- Charlie Berry
- Tom Berry
- Harry Berthrong
- William Bestick
- Dan Bickham
- Ed Biecher
- Oscar Bielaski
- Lou Bierbauer
- Charles Bierman
- George Bignell
- Jud Birchall
- Frank Bird
- George Bird
- Dave Birdsall
- Bill Bishop
- Frank Bishop
- Red Bittmann
- Bob Black
- George Blackburn
- Bill Blair
- Dick Blaisdell
- Harry Blake
- Bob Blakiston
- Fred Blank
- Harvey Blauvelt
- Ned Bligh
- Frank Bliss
- Wes Blogg
- Joe Blong
- Steve Bloomer
- Frederick Boardman
- Charlie Bohn
- Boland
- Tommy Bond
- Frank Bonner
- George Boone
- Booth
- Amos Booth
- Eddie Booth
- George Borchers
- Joe Borden
- Andy Boswell
- Cy Bowen
- Frank Bowerman
- Frank Bowes
- Bill Bowman
- Sumner Bowman
- Bill Boyd
- Frank Boyd
- Jake Boyd
- Eddie Boyle
- Henry Boyle
- Jack Boyle
- Henry Boyle
- Al Bradley
- Bill Bradley
- Foghorn Bradley
- George Bradley
- Spike Brady
- Steve Brady
- Asa Brainard
- Mike Brannock
- Kitty Bransfield
- Kitty Brashear
- Alonzo Breitenstein
- Ted Breitenstein
- Jack Brennan
- Roger Bresnahan
- Buttons Briggs
- Charlie Briggs
- Grant Briggs
- Frank Brill
- Fatty Briody
- George Bristow
- Jim Britt
- Steve Brodie
- Cal Broughton
- Dan Brouthers
- Charlie Brown
- Ed Brown
- Jim Brown
- Joe Brown
- John Brown
- Lew Brown
- Oliver Brown
- Robert Brown
- Stub Brown
- Tom Brown
- William Brown
- Pete Browning
- George Bryant
- Tod Brynan
- Fred Buckingham
- Dick Buckley
- John Buckley
- Jay Budd
- Fritz Buelow
- Charlie Buffinton
- Henry Buker
- Sim Bullas
- Josh Bunce
- Ernie Burch
- Bill Burdick
- Jack Burdock
- Dan Burke
- Eddie Burke
- James Burke
- Jimmy Burke
- Joe Burke
- Mike Burke
- William Burke
- Jesse Burkett
- Hercules Burnett
- Dick Burns
- Jim Burns
- John Burns
- Oyster Burns
- Tom Burns
- Buster Burrell
- Harry Burrell
- Al Burris
- Henry Burroughs
- Frank Burt
- Doc Bushong
- Bill Butler
- Dick Butler
- Frank Butler
- Kid Butler
- Frank Buttery

== C ==
- Charlie Cady
- John Cahill
- Tom Cahill
- Will Calihan
- Ed Callahan
- John Callahan
- Nixey Callahan
- Kid Camp
- Lew Camp
- Count Campau
- Hugh Campbell
- Mike Campbell
- Sam Campbell
- Sal Campfield
- Jim Canavan
- Bart Cantz
- John Carbine
- Roger Carey
- Scoops Carey
- Tom Carey
- Ed Carfrey
- Bobby Cargo
- Fred Carl
- John Carl
- Jim Carleton
- George Carman
- Jack Carney
- Hick Carpenter
- Charlie Carr
- Bill Carrick
- Chick Carroll
- Cliff Carroll
- Fred Carroll
- Pat Carroll
- Scrappy Carroll
- Kid Carsey
- Ed Cartwright
- Bob Caruthers
- Bob Casey
- Dan Casey
- Dennis Casey
- Doc Casey
- Tommy Casey
- Ed Cassian
- Ed Caskin
- John Cassidy
- Pete Cassidy
- John Cattanach
- James Cavanagh
- Ice Box Chamberlain
- Rome Chambers
- Frank Chance
- Frank Chapman
- Jack Chapman
- Jim Chatterton
- Jack Chesbro
- Bill Childress
- Cupid Childs
- Sam Childs
- Pearce Chiles
- Hi Church
- Bobby Clack
- Aaron Clapp
- John Clapp
- Denny Clare
- Bob Clark
- Ed Clark
- Spider Clark
- Willie Clark
- Win Clark
- Artie Clarke
- Boileryard Clarke
- Dad Clarke
- Harry Clarke
- Henry Clarke
- Josh Clarke
- Fred Clarke
- Dad Clarkson
- John Clarkson
- Fritz Clausen
- Fred Clement
- Jack Clements
- Elmer Cleveland
- Monk Cline
- Billy Clingman
- Jim Clinton
- Bill Clymer
- George Cobb
- Dick Cogan
- Ed Cogswell
- Tom Colcolough
- John Coleman - OF/P
- John Coleman - 1890 P
- Percy Coleman
- Walter Coleman
- Billy Colgan
- Harry Colliflower
- Bill Collins
- Chub Collins
- Dan Collins
- Hub Collins
- Jimmy Collins
- Bill Collver
- Charles Comiskey
- Fred Cone
- Ed Conley
- Bert Conn
- Frank Connaughton
- Peter Connell
- Terry Connell
- Red Connally
- Jim Connor
- Joe Connor
- John Connor
- Ned Connor
- Roger Connor
- Jerry Connors
- Joe Connors
- Theodore Conover
- Ben Conroy
- Bill Conway
- Dick Conway
- Jim Conway
- Pete Conway
- Dan Coogan
- Paul Cook
- Fred Cooke
- Duff Cooley
- William Coon
- Jimmy Cooney
- Joe Corbett
- Jack Corcoran
- John Corcoran
- Larry Corcoran
- Mike Corcoran
- Tommy Corcoran
- Fred Corey
- Phil Coridan
- Pop Corkhill
- Henry Cote
- Dan Cotter
- Tom Cotter
- Bill Coughlin
- Dennis Coughlin
- Ed Coughlin
- Roscoe Coughlin
- Bill Coyle
- Frank Cox
- Dick Cramer
- Ed Crane
- Fred Crane
- Sam Crane
- Bill Craver
- George Crawford
- Sam Crawford
- George Creamer
- Mark Creegan
- Gus Creely
- Pete Cregan
- Jim Creighton
- Morrie Critchley
- Art Croft
- Harry Croft
- Dan Cronin
- Jack Cronin
- Jack Crooks
- George Crosby
- Amos Cross
- Clarence Cross
- Joe Cross
- Lave Cross
- Lem Cross
- Monte Cross
- Doug Crothers
- Joe Crotty
- Billy Crowell
- Bill Crowley
- John Crowley
- Jim Cudworth
- John Cuff
- John Cullen
- Candy Cummings
- Bert Cunningham
- George Cuppy
- Doc Curley
- John Curran
- Wes Curry
- Jim Curtiss
- Ed Cushman
- Ned Cuthbert

== D ==
- Bill Dahlen
- John Dailey
- Con Daily
- Ed Daily
- Hugh Daily
- Vince Dailey
- George Daisy
- Bill Daley
- Abner Dalrymple
- Joe Daly
- Tom Daly
- Bill Dammann
- Charlie Daniels
- Law Daniels
- Pete Daniels
- George Darby
- Dell Darling
- Jack Darragh
- Dan Daub
- George Davies
- Daisy Davis
- George Davis
- Harry Davis
- Ira Davis
- Jumbo Davis
- Wiley Davis
- Bill Day
- Ren Deagle
- Pat Dealy
- John Deasley
- Dory Dean
- Harry Deane
- Pat Deasley
- Frank Decker
- George Decker
- Harry Decker
- Jimmy Dee
- Herman Dehlman
- Ed Delahanty
- Tom Delahanty
- Bill Delaney
- Fred Demarais
- Harry DeMiller
- Gene DeMontreville
- Jerry Denny
- Roger Denzer
- Gene Derby
- George Derby
- Jim Devlin (1870s P)
- Jim Devlin (1880s P)
- Thomas Devyr
- Charlie Dewald
- Charlie Dexter
- Buttercup Dickerson
- Steve Dignan
- Pat Dillard
- John Dillon
- Packy Dillon
- Pop Dillon
- Bill Dinneen
- Frank Diven
- Fred Doe
- Ed Doheny
- Cozy Dolan
- Joe Dolan
- John Dolan
- Tom Dolan
- Lester Dole
- Jiggs Donahue
- Jim Donahue
- Red Donahue
- Tim Donahue
- Frank Donnelly
- James Donnelly
- Jim Donnelly
- Pete Donnelly
- Alexander Donoghue
- Bill Donovan
- Fred Donovan
- Patsy Donovan
- John Doran
- Jerry Dorgan
- Mike Dorgan
- Bert Dorr
- Joseph Dorsey
- Herm Doscher
- Babe Doty
- Charlie Dougherty
- Klondike Douglass
- Clarence Dow
- Tommy Dowd
- Joe Dowie
- Pete Dowling
- Tom Dowse
- Conny Doyle
- Jack Doyle
- Jacob Doyle
- John Doyle
- Lyman Drake
- Dave Drew
- Dennis Driscoll
- Denny Driscoll
- Mike Drissel
- Charlie Duffee
- Ed Duffy
- Hugh Duffy
- Bill Dugan
- Ed Dugan
- Dan Dugdale
- Bill Duggleby
- Martin Duke
- Jim Duncan
- Ed Dundon
- Sam Dungan
- Davey Dunkle
- Fred Dunlap
- Jack Dunn
- Steve Dunn
- Andy Dunning
- Jesse Duryea
- Bill Duzen
- Al Dwight
- Frank Dwyer
- John Dwyer
- John Dyler

== E ==
- Bill Eagan
- Bill Eagle
- Howard Earl
- Billy Earle
- Mal Eason
- Harry East
- Henry Easterday
- Jack Easton
- Hi Ebright
- Charlie Eden
- Edwards
- Jim Egan
- Rip Egan
- Dave Eggler
- Red Ehret
- Ed Eiteljorge
- Eland
- Kid Elberfeld
- Joe Ellick
- Ben Ellis
- Bones Ely
- Harry Ely
- Charlie Emig
- Bob Emslie
- Duke Esper
- Dude Esterbrook
- Frank Eustace
- Evans
- Jake Evans
- Roy Evans
- Bill Everitt
- Tom Evers
- George Ewell
- Buck Ewing
- John Ewing

== F ==
- Jay Faatz
- Bill Fagan
- Joe Fagin
- George Fair
- Anton Falch
- Jack Fanning
- Lawrence Farley
- Bill Farmer
- Sid Farrar
- Bill Farrell
- Duke Farrell
- Jack Farrell - Second Baseman
- Jack Farrell - Outfielder
- Joe Farrell
- John Farrow
- Frederick Fass
- C. K. Fauver
- Jack Fee
- Frank Fennelly
- Bob Ferguson
- Charlie Ferguson
- Alex Ferson
- Jim Field
- Sam Field
- George Fields
- Jocko Fields
- Jack Fifield
- Frank Figgemeier
- Bill Finley
- John Firth
- John Fischer
- Leo Fishel
- Charlie Fisher
- Charlie Fisher
- Chauncey Fisher
- Cherokee Fisher
- George Fisher
- Ike Fisher
- Wes Fisler
- Dennis Fitzgerald
- John Fitzgerald (Rochester Broncos pitcher)
- John Fitzgerald (Boston Reds pitcher)
- Warren Fitzgerald
- Martin Flaherty
- Pat Flaherty
- Patsy Flaherty
- Ed Flanagan
- Frank Fleet
- Tom Fleming
- George Fletcher
- Elmer Flick
- Silver Flint
- Tim Flood
- Dickie Flowers
- Carney Flynn
- Clipper Flynn
- Ed Flynn
- George Flynn
- Jocko Flynn
- Joe Flynn
- Mike Flynn
- Jim Fogarty
- John Fogarty
- Curry Foley
- John Foley
- Tom Foley
- Will Foley
- Jim Foran
- Davy Force
- Ed Ford
- Tom Ford
- Brownie Foreman
- Frank Foreman
- Tom Forster
- Elmer Foster
- Pop Foster
- Reddy Foster
- Robert Foster
- Henry Fournier
- Bill Fouser
- Dave Foutz
- Bud Fowler
- Bill Fox
- George Fox
- John Fox
- Ossie France
- Charlie Frank
- Fred Frank
- Franklin
- Chick Fraser
- Buck Freeman
- Julie Freeman
- Bill French
- Frank Freund
- Pat Friel
- Danny Friend
- Pete Fries
- Charlie Frisbee
- Emil Frisk
- Ed Fuller
- Harry Fuller
- Shorty Fuller
- Chick Fulmer
- Chris Fulmer
- Washington Fulmer
- Dave Fultz
- Eddie Fusselback

== G ==
- Bill Gallagher
- William Gallagher
- John Galligan
- Pete Galligan
- John Galvin
- Lou Galvin
- Pud Galvin
- Bob Gamble
- Gussie Gannon
- Charlie Ganzel
- John Ganzel
- Alex Gardner
- Bill Gardner
- Gid Gardner
- Jim Gardner
- Bill Garfield
- Willie Garoni
- Jim Garry
- Ned Garvin
- Ed Gastfield
- Hank Gastright
- Frank Gatins
- Mike Gaule
- Dale Gear
- Count Gedney
- Billy Geer
- Charlie Geggus
- Phil Geier
- Bill Geiss
- Emil Geiss
- Frank Genins
- Bill George
- Joe Gerhardt
- Les German
- Charlie Gettig
- Tom Gettinger
- Charlie Getzien
- Charlie Gessner
- Jake Gettman
- Robert Gibson
- Whitey Gibson
- Bill Gilbert
- Harry H. Gilbert
- Jack Gilbert
- John Gilbert
- Pete Gilbert
- Hugh Gilgan
- Bob Gilks
- Jim Gill
- Sam Gillen
- Tom Gillen
- Jim Gillespie
- Patrick Gillespie
- Barney Gilligan
- George Gillpatrick
- Jim Gilman
- Pit Gilman
- Jim Gilmore
- Henry Gilroy
- John Gilroy
- Billy Ging
- Buck Gladmon
- Jack Glasscock
- Bill Gleason (P)
- Bill Gleason (SS)
- Jack Gleason
- Bob Glenalvin
- Ed Glenn - OF
- Ed Glenn - SS
- John Glenn
- Jot Goar
- John Godar
- Billy Goeckel
- George Goetz
- Mike Golden
- Walt Goldsby
- Fred Goldsmith
- Wally Goldsmith
- Herb Goodall
- Bill Goodenough
- Mike Goodfellow
- Jake Goodman
- George Gore
- Jack Gorman
- Joe Gormley
- Charlie Gould
- John Grady
- Mike Grady
- Louis Graff
- John Graff
- Bernie Graham
- Lew Graulich
- Frank Graves
- Charlie Gray
- Chummy Gray
- Jim Gray
- John Greason
- Danny Green
- Ed Green
- Jim Green
- John Greenig
- Bill Greenwood
- Ed Greer
- Ed Gremminger
- Mike Griffin
- Sandy Griffin
- Thomas Griffin
- Clark Griffith
- Frank Griffith
- John Grim
- John Grimes
- Emil Gross
- Henry Gruber
- Ben Guiney
- Ad Gumbert
- Billy Gumbert
- Fred Gunkle
- Tom Gunning
- Joe Gunson
- Charlie Guth

== H ==
- Irv Hach
- Mert Hackett
- Walter Hackett
- George Haddock
- Frank Hafner
- Art Hagan
- Bill Hague
- Noodles Hahn
- Ed Haigh
- Ed Halbriter
- John Haldeman
- Al Hall
- Charlie Hall
- George Hall
- Jim Hall
- Russ Hall
- Jimmy Hallinan
- Bill Hallman
- Charlie Hallstrom
- Jim Halpin
- Ralph Ham
- Charlie Hamburg
- John Hamill
- Billy Hamilton
- Jim Handiboe
- Frank Hankinson
- Ned Hanlon
- John Hanna
- Frank Hansford
- Bill Harbridge
- Scott Hardesty
- Lou Hardie
- John Harkins
- Dick Harley
- George Harper
- Jack Harper
- Jerry Harrington
- Joe Harrington
- Charlie Harris
- Frank Harris
- Bill Hart
- Billy Hart
- Tom Hart
- Jumbo Harting
- Fred Hartman
- Pat Hartnett
- Topsy Hartsel
- Zaza Harvey
- Pete Hasney
- Bill Hassamaer
- Charlie Hastings
- Scott Hastings
- Gil Hatfield
- John Hatfield
- Charlie Hautz
- Bill Hawes
- Bill Hawke
- Thorny Hawkes
- Marvin Hawley
- Pink Hawley
- Jackie Hayes
- John Hayes
- James Haley
- Fred Hayner
- Tom Healey
- Egyptian Healy
- Charlie Heard
- Guy Hecker
- Emmet Heidrick
- Frank Heifer
- Jack Heinzman
- Hellings
- Tony Hellman
- Horace Helmbold
- George Hemming
- Ducky Hemp
- Charlie Hemphill
- Hardie Henderson
- Moxie Hengel
- George Henry
- John Henry
- Art Herman
- Tom Hernon
- Joseph Herr
- Lefty Herring
- Tom Hess
- George Heubel
- Jake Hewitt
- John Hibbard
- Mike Hickey
- Charlie Hickman
- Ernie Hickman
- Nat Hicks
- Higby
- Bill Higgins
- Dick Higham
- John Hiland
- Belden Hill
- Bill Hill
- Charlie Hilsey
- Hunkey Hines
- Mike Hines
- Paul Hines
- Charlie Hodes
- Charlie Hodnett
- George Hodson
- Bill Hoffer
- Frank Hoffman
- Jesse Hoffmeister
- John Hofford
- Bob Hogan
- Marty Hogan
- Mortimer Hogan
- Sonny Hoffman
- George Hogreiver
- Bill Holbert
- Jim Holdsworth
- Will Holland
- Bug Holliday
- Holly Hollingshead
- John Hollison
- Ducky Holmes
- Marty Honan
- Mike Hooper
- Buster Hoover
- Charlie Hoover
- Patrick Horan
- Jack Horner
- Joe Hornung
- Elmer Horton
- Pete Hotaling
- Sadie Houck
- Charlie Householder (1B)
- Charlie Householder (UP)
- John Houseman
- William Houseman
- Lefty Houtz
- Shorty Howe
- Harry Howell
- Dummy Hoy
- Al Hubbard
- Nat Hudson
- Frank Huelsman
- Bill Hughes
- Jay Hughes
- Mickey Hughes
- Tom Hughes
- Jim Hughey
- Billy Hulen
- John Humphries
- Dick Hunt
- Bill Hunter
- Lem Hunter
- Dick Hurley
- Jerry Hurley
- Bill Husted
- Bert Husting
- Ed Hutchinson
- Bill Hutchison
- William Hyndman

== I ==
- Charlie Ingraham
- Bert Inks
- Arthur Irwin
- Charlie Irwin
- Bill Irwin
- John Irwin
- Frank Isbell

== J ==
- Fred Jacklitsch
- Henry Jackson
- Sam Jackson
- Harry Jacoby
- Alamazoo Jennings
- Hughie Jennings
- Nat Jewett
- Tommy Johns
- Abe Johnson
- William Johnson
- Lefty Johnson
- Lou Johnson
- Spud Johnson
- Youngy Johnson
- Dick Johnston
- Jones - LF
- Jones - 3B
- Alex Jones
- Bill Jones
- Bumpus Jones
- Charley Jones
- Charlie Jones
- Cowboy Jones
- David Jones
- Fielder Jones
- Frank Jones
- Henry Jones - P
- Henry Jones - 2B
- Jumping Jack Jones
- Jim Jones
- Levin Jones
- Mike Jones
- Charlie Jordan
- Harry Jordan
- Pop Joy
- Bill Joyce
- George Joyce

== K ==
- Mike Kahoe
- Charlie Kalbfus
- Jerry Kane
- Heinie Kappel
- Joe Kappel
- Jack Katoll
- Tom Kearns
- Ed Keas
- Bob Keating
- George Keefe
- John Keefe
- Tim Keefe
- Willie Keeler
- Jack Keenan
- Jim Keenan
- Harry Keener
- George Keerl
- Bill Keister
- George Kelb
- Mike Kelley
- Frank Keffer
- Nate Kellogg
- Bill Kelly
- Charlie Kelly
- John Kelly
- Kick Kelly
- King Kelly
- John Kelty
- Bill Kemmer
- Rudy Kemmler
- Brickyard Kennedy
- Doc Kennedy
- Ed Kennedy
- John Kenney
- Ed Kent
- John Kerins
- Joe Kernan
- Henry Kessler
- Fred Ketcham
- Bill Kienzle
- John Kiley
- Henry Killeen
- Frank Killen
- Matt Kilroy
- Gene Kimball
- Sam Kimber
- Sam King
- Steve King
- Marshall King
- Silver King
- Billy Kinloch
- William Kinsler
- Tom Kinslow
- Walt Kinzie
- John Kirby
- Bill Kissinger
- Frank Kitson
- Malachi Kittridge
- Bill Kling
- Johnny Kling
- Fred Klobedanz
- Billy Klusman
- Frank Knauss
- Phil Knell
- Charlie Knepper
- George Knight
- Joe Knight
- Lon Knight
- Ed Knouff
- Jake Knowdell
- Jimmy Knowles
- Andy Knox
- Henry Kohler
- Eddie Kolb
- Harry Koons
- Jim Korwan
- Joe Kostal
- Frank Kreeger
- Charlie Krehmeyer
- Bill Krieg
- Gus Krock
- Otto Krueger
- Al Krumm
- Bill Kuehne
- Charlie Kuhns

== L ==
- Candy LaChance
- William Lackey
- Steve Ladew
- Hi Ladd
- Flip Lafferty
- Nap Lajoie
- Dan Lally
- Henry Lampe
- Doc Landis
- Chappy Lane
- Bill Lange
- Bob Langsford
- Henry Larkin
- Terry Larkin
- Patrick Larkins
- Sam LaRocque
- Arlie Latham
- Juice Latham
- Tacks Latimer
- Billy Lauder
- Chuck Lauer
- Ben Laughlin
- Johnny Lavin
- Mike Lawlor
- Alfred Lawson
- Tommy Leach
- Dan Leahy
- Tom Leahy
- Jack Leary
- Mike Ledwith
- Leonidas Lee
- Sam Leever
- James Lehan
- Mike Lehane
- John Leighton
- Jack Leiper
- Bill Leith
- Doc Leitner
- Bill Lennon
- David Lenz
- Leonard
- Andy Leonard
- Tom Letcher
- Charlie Levis
- Lewis
- Edward M. "Ted" Lewis
- Fred Lewis
- Steve Libby
- Jim Lillie
- Ezra Lincoln
- Tom Lipp
- Harry Little
- Abel Lizotte
- Harry Lochhead
- Marshall Locke
- Milo Lockwood
- Tom Loftus
- Pete Lohman
- Herman Long
- Jim Long
- Thomas Long
- Bill Loughran
- Len Lovett
- Tom Lovett
- Bobby Lowe
- Charlie Lowe
- Dick Lowe
- Con Lucid
- Henry Luff
- Al Lukens
- Billy Lush
- Luke Lutenberg
- Henry Lynch
- Jack Lynch
- Denny Lyons
- Harry Lyons
- Toby Lyons
- John Lyston
- Dad Lytle

== M ==
- Mac MacArthur
- Harry Mace
- Macey
- Connie Mack
- Denny Mack
- Reddy Mack
- Jimmy Macullar
- Kid Madden
- Tony Madigan
- Art Madison
- Bill Magee
- John Magner
- George Magoon
- Lou Mahaffey
- Dan Mahoney
- Mike Mahoney
- Willard Mains
- John Malarkey
- Fergy Malone
- John Maloney
- Charlie Manlove
- Fred Mann
- Jack Manning
- Jim Manning
- Tim Manning
- John Mansell
- Mike Mansell
- Tom Mansell
- George Mappes
- Lefty Marr
- Ed Mars
- Al Martin
- Frank Martin
- Phonney Martin
- Harry Maskrey
- Leech Maskrey
- Charlie Mason
- Ernie Mason
- Bill Massey
- Bobby Mathews
- C. V. Matteson
- Charles Matthews
- Christy Mathewson
- Steve Matthias
- Mike Mattimore
- Hal Mauck
- Fred Mauer
- Al Maul
- Harry Maupin
- Ed Mayer
- Al Mays
- Sport McAllister
- Bub McAtee
- McBride
- Algie McBride
- Dick McBride
- Pete McBride
- Harry McCaffery
- Bill McCaffrey
- Sparrow McCaffrey
- Jack McCarthy
- Tommy McCarthy
- Frank McCarton
- John McCarty
- Al McCauley
- Bill McCauley
- Jim McCauley
- Bill McClellan
- McCloskey
- Bill McCloskey
- Hal McClure
- Barry McCormick
- Harry McCormick
- Jerry McCormick
- Jim McCormick
- Jim McCormick
- Art McCoy
- Tom McCreery
- Charlie McCullough
- James McDermott
- Michael McDermott
- Mike McDermott
- Sandy McDermott
- Jack McDonald
- Jim McDonald
- McDoolan
- Dewey McDougal
- Sandy McDougal
- Jim McElroy
- Guy McFadden
- Alex McFarlan
- Dan McFarlan
- Chris McFarland
- Ed McFarland
- Herm McFarland
- Monte McFarland
- Jack McFetridge
- Ambrose McGann
- Dan McGann
- Chippy McGarr
- Jack McGeachey
- Mike McGeary
- Pat McGee
- Willie McGill
- Jim McGinley
- Tim McGinley
- Frank McGinn
- Gus McGinnis
- Jumbo McGinnis
- Joe McGinnity
- John McGlone
- Tom McGovern
- John McGraw
- Mark McGrillis
- Joe McGuckin
- John McGuinness
- McGuire
- Deacon McGuire
- Bill McGunnigle
- Bob McHale
- Frank McIntyre
- Doc McJames
- Frank McKee
- Ed McKean
- Jim McKeever
- John McKelvey
- Russ McKelvy
- Ed McKenna
- Frank McKenna
- Kit McKenna
- Patrick McKenna
- Larry McKeon
- Alex McKinnon
- Barney McLaughlin
- Frank McLaughlin
- Jim McLaughlin
- Tom McLaughlin
- Warren McLaughlin
- Jack McMahon
- Sadie McMahon
- Frank McManus
- Pat McManus
- George McMillan
- John McMullin
- Edgar McNabb
- Frank McPartlin
- Bid McPhee
- Mart McQuaid
- Mox McQuery
- McRemer
- Pete McShannic
- Trick McSorley
- Paul McSweeney
- Jim McTamany
- Cal McVey
- George McVey
- George Meakim
- Pete Meegan
- Dad Meek
- Jouett Meekin
- Frank Meinke
- George Meister
- John Meister
- Jock Menefee
- Win Mercer
- Ed Merrill
- Bill Merritt
- Sam Mertes
- Tom Messitt
- Alfred Metcalfe
- Levi Meyerle
- George Meyers
- Lou Meyers
- Frank Millard
- Bert Miller
- Bob Miller
- Cyclone Miller
- Doggie Miller
- Dusty Miller
- Ed Miller
- George Miller
- Joe Miller (second baseman)
- Joe Miller (shortstop)
- Kohly Miller
- Ralph Miller
- Tom Miller
- Jocko Milligan
- Charlie Mills
- Everett Mills
- Ed Mincher
- Dan Minnehan
- Bobby Mitchell
- Joe Moffet
- Sam Moffet
- Kid Mohler
- Carlton Molesworth
- Frank W. Monroe
- George Moolic
- Henry Moore
- Jerry Moore
- Molly Moore
- Bill Moran
- Sam Moran
- Harry Morelock
- Bill Morgan OF/C
- Bill Morgan OF/SS
- Pidgey Morgan
- Gene Moriarty
- John Morrill
- Ed Morris
- James Morris
- Peter Morris
- Hank Morrison
- Jon Morrison
- Mike Morrison
- Tom Morrison
- John Morrissey
- Tom Morrissey
- Charlie Morton
- Frank Motz
- Frank Mountain
- Bill Mountjoy
- Mike Moynahan
- Mike Muldoon
- John Mullen
- Martin Mullen
- Tony Mullane
- John Mulligan
- Henry Mullin
- Joe Mulvey
- George Mundinger
- John Munce
- Horatio Munn
- Tim Murnane
- Murphy
- Bob Murphy
- Clarence Murphy
- Con Murphy
- Connie Murphy
- Danny Murphy - C
- Danny Murphy - 2B
- Ed Murphy
- Joe Murphy
- John Murphy
- Larry Murphy
- Morgan Murphy
- Tony Murphy
- Willie Murphy
- Yale Murphy
- Miah Murray
- Tom Murray
- Jim Mutrie
- Al Myers
- Bert Myers
- Henry Myers

== N ==
- Tom Nagle
- Kid Nance
- Billy Nash
- Sandy Nava
- Jack Neagle
- Joe Neale
- Bill Nelson
- Candy Nelson
- Maud Nelson
- Alexander Nevin
- John Newell
- T. E. Newell
- Charlie Newman
- Doc Newton
- Sam Nicholl
- Al Nichols
- Art Nichols
- Kid Nichols
- Tricky Nichols
- Parson Nicholson
- George Nicol
- Hugh Nicol
- Tom Niland
- Bill Niles
- George Noftsker
- The Only Nolan
- Jerry Nops
- Effie Norton
- Frank Norton
- Emory Nusz
- Charlie Nyce

== O ==
- Henry Oberbeck
- Doc Oberlander
- Billy O'Brien
- Cinders O'Brien
- Darby O'Brien
- Jack O'Brien (C)
- Jack O'Brien (OF)
- John O'Brien (2B)
- John O'Brien (OF)
- Tom H. O'Brien
- Pete O'Brien
- Tom J. O'Brien
- John O'Connell
- Pat O'Connell
- Dan O'Connor
- Frank O'Connor
- Jack O'Connor
- John O'Donnell
- Dave Oldfield
- Franklin W. Olin
- Dan O'Leary
- Patrick O'Loughlin
- Tom O'Meara
- Ed O'Neil
- Fancy O'Neil
- Hugh O'Neil
- Dennis O'Neill
- Fred O'Neill
- John O'Neill
- Tip O'Neill
- O'Rourke
- Jim O'Rourke
- John O'Rourke
- Mike O'Rourke
- Tim O'Rourke
- Tom O'Rourke
- Tom Oran
- Dave Orr
- Al Orth
- Fred Osborne
- Charlie Osterhout
- John Otten
- Billy Otterson
- Red Owens
- Henry Oxley

== P ==
- Charlie Pabor
- Ed Pabst
- Dick Padden
- Billy Palmer
- John Pappalau
- Freddy Parent
- Doc Parker
- Jay Parker
- Bill Parks
- Jiggs Parrott
- Tom Parrott
- Charlie Parsons
- George Patterson
- Tom Patterson
- Lou Paul
- Harley Payne
- George Paynter
- Elias Peak
- Dickey Pearce
- Frank Pearce
- Frank Pears
- George Pechiney
- Heinie Peitz
- Joe Peitz
- Louis Pelouze
- John Peltz
- Jimmy Peoples
- Harrison Peppers
- John Peters
- Pat Pettee
- Bob Pettit
- Charlie Petty
- Bill Pfann
- Fred Pfeffer
- Dan Phelan
- Dick Phelan
- Nealy Phelps
- Deacon Phillippe
- Bill Phillips - 1B
- Bill Phillips - P
- Marr Phillips
- Bill Phyle
- Wiley Piatt
- Ollie Pickering
- Dave Pickett
- John Pickett
- Frank Pidgeon
- Gracie Pierce
- Maury Pierce
- Andy Piercy
- Dave Pierson
- Dick Pierson
- Israel Pike
- Lip Pike
- Ed Pinkham
- George Pinkney
- James Pirie
- Togie Pittinger
- Herman Pitz
- Walter Plock
- Mark Polhemus
- Arlie Pond
- Ed Poole
- Tom Poorman
- George Popplein
- Henry Porter
- Matthew Porter
- Doc Potts
- Abner Powell
- Jack Powell
- Jim Powell
- Martin Powell
- Tom Power
- Doc Powers
- Jim Powers
- Phil Powers
- Al Pratt
- Tom Pratt
- Walt Preston
- Bill Price
- Walter Prince
- George Proeser
- John Puhl
- Blondie Purcell
- Oscar Purner
- Shadow Pyle

== Q ==
- Bill Quarles
- Joe Quest
- Quinlan
- Frank Quinlan
- Quinn
- Frank Quinn
- Joe Quinn 2B
- Joe Quinn C
- Paddy Quinn
- Tom Quinn
- Marshall Quinton

== R ==
- Charles Radbourn
- George Radbourn
- John Radcliff
- Paul Radford
- John Rainey
- Toad Ramsey
- Irv Ray
- Harry Raymond
- Al Reach
- Bob Reach
- Jeremiah Reardon
- John Reccius
- Phil Reccius
- Billy Redmond
- Icicle Reeder
- Nick Reeder
- Joe Regan
- Billy Reid
- Hugh Reid
- Bill Reidy
- Charlie Reilley
- Charlie Reilly
- Joe Reilly
- John Reilly
- Josh Reilly
- Charlie Reipschlager
- Laurie Reis
- Charlie Reising
- Heinie Reitz
- Jack Remsen
- George Rettger
- Henry Reville
- Charlie Reynolds (OF)
- Charlie Reynolds (P)
- William Rexter
- Billy Rhines
- Danny Richardson
- Hardy Richardson
- John Richmond
- Lee Richmond
- John Richter
- Joe Rickert
- Chris Rickley
- John Ricks
- John Riddle
- Dorsey Riddlemoser
- Billy Riley
- Frank Ringo
- Claude Ritchey
- Charlie Ritter
- Floyd Ritter
- Whitey Ritterson
- Jim Ritz
- John Roach
- Skel Roach
- Fred Roat
- Charlie Robinson
- Fred Robinson
- Jack Robinson
- Val Robinson
- Wilbert Robinson
- Yank Robinson
- Adam Rocap
- Emmett Rogers
- Fraley Rogers
- Jim Rogers
- Bill Rollinson
- George Rooks
- Rosie Rosebraugh
- Chief Roseman
- Bill Rotes
- Bobby Rothermel
- Jack Rothfuss
- Phil Routcliffe
- Dave Rowe
- Jack Rowe
- Ed Rowen
- Joseph A. Roxburgh
- John Rudderham
- John Russ
- Paul Russell
- Cyclone Ryan
- Jack Ryan
- Jimmy Ryan
- John Ryan
- Johnny Ryan
- Mike Ryan
- Tom Ryder

== S ==
- Harry Sage
- Pony Sager
- Ed Sales
- Harry Salisbury
- Ike Samuels
- Ben Sanders
- Edward Santry
- Al Sauter
- Will Sawyer
- Jimmy Say
- Lou Say
- Mort Scanlan
- Pat Scanlon
- Harry Schafer
- John Schappert
- Nick Scharf
- Ted Scheffler
- Frank Scheibeck
- Jack Scheible
- Al Schellhase
- Bill Schenck
- Harry Scherer
- Crazy Schmit
- Jumbo Schoeneck
- Otto Schomberg
- Ossee Schreckengost
- Pop Schriver
- John Schultz - P
- John Schulze (baseball) - C
- Bill Schwartz
- Scott
- Ed Scott
- Milt Scott
- Doc Sechrist
- Emmett Seery
- Kip Selbach
- Frank Sellman
- Count Sensenderfer
- Billy Serad
- Ed Seward
- George Seward
- Socks Seybold
- Cy Seymour
- Jake Seymour
- Tom Sexton
- Orator Shafer
- Taylor Shafer
- Shaffer
- Art Sladen
- John Shaffer
- Gus Shallix
- Jim Shanley
- Dan Shannon
- Frank Shannon
- George Sharrott
- Jack Sharrott
- Dupee Shaw
- Sam Shaw
- Dan Sheahan
- Mike Shea
- John Shearon
- Jimmy Sheckard
- Biff Sheehan
- Tommy Sheehan
- John Sheppard
- Sheridan
- John Shetzline
- Lev Shreve
- Billy Shindle
- Tim Shinnick
- George Shoch
- John Shoupe
- Frank Shugart
- Fred Siefke
- Fred Siegel
- Frank Siffell
- Ed Silch
- Hank Simon
- Joe Simmons
- Marty Simpson
- Ed Sixsmith
- Al Skinner
- Jimmy Slagle
- John Slagle
- Will Smalley
- Bill Smiley
- Smith
- Aleck Smith
- Bill Smith (OF/Manager)
- Bill Smith (OF)
- Billy Smith (P)
- Charlie Smith
- Ed Smith
- Edgar Smith (OF)
- Edgar Smith (OF/P)
- Frank Smith
- Fred Smith
- Germany Smith
- Harry Smith
- Harvey Smith
- Heinie Smith
- John Smith (1B)
- John Smith (SS)
- Jud Smith
- Leo Smith
- Lewis Smith
- Mike Smith
- Ollie Smith
- Phenomenal Smith
- Pop Smith
- Rex Smith
- Skyrocket Smith
- Stub Smith
- Tom Smith - 2B
- Tom Smith - P
- John Sneed
- Charlie Snow
- Charles Snyder
- Cooney Snyder
- George Snyder
- Jim Snyder
- Josh Snyder
- Pop Snyder
- Redleg Snyder
- Louis Sockalexis
- Andy Sommerville
- Ed Somerville
- Joe Sommer
- Andy Sommers
- Bill Sowders
- John Sowders
- Len Sowders
- Albert Spalding
- Tully Sparks
- Spencer
- Harry Spies
- Charlie Sprague
- Ed Springer
- Ed Spurney
- Joe Stabell
- Stafford
- General Stafford
- John Stafford
- Chick Stahl
- Harry Staley
- George Stallings
- Joe Stanley - OF (1880s)
- Joe Stanley - OF (1900s)
- Joe Start
- Bill Stearns
- Dan Stearns
- John Stedronsky
- Farmer Steelman
- Gene Steere
- Ed Stein
- Henry Stein
- Harry Steinfeldt
- Bill Stellberger
- Bill Stemmyer
- Jake Stenzel
- Ben Stephens
- Clarence Stephens
- Dummy Stephenson
- John Sterling
- Ace Stewart
- Archie Stimmel
- Harry Stine
- Gat Stires
- Jack Stivetts
- Len Stockwell
- Stoddard
- Harry Stovey
- Tom Stouch
- Sammy Strang
- Asa Stratton
- Ed Stratton
- Scott Stratton
- Joe Straub
- Joe Strauss
- Oscar Streit
- Charles Strick
- Cub Stricker
- George Strief
- John Strike
- Al Strueve
- Bill Stuart
- Sy Studley
- George Stultz
- Neil Stynes
- Tony Suck
- Willie Sudhoff
- Joe Sugden
- Sullivan
- Bill Sullivan - OF
- Bill Sullivan - P
- Billy Sullivan
- Chub Sullivan
- Dan Sullivan
- Denny Sullivan
- Fleury Sullivan
- Joe Sullivan
- Jim Sullivan
- Marty Sullivan
- Mike Sullivan - OF
- Mike Sullivan - P
- Pat Sullivan
- Sleeper Sullivan
- Suter Sullivan
- Ted Sullivan
- Tom Sullivan
- Art Sunday
- Billy Sunday
- Sy Sutcliffe
- Jack Sutthoff
- Ezra Sutton
- Cy Swaim
- Andy Swan
- Marty Swandell
- Bill Swarback
- Parke Swartzel
- Ed Swartwood
- Charlie Sweasy
- Bill Sweeney
- Charlie Sweeney
- Dan Sweeney
- Jerry Sweeney
- Pete Sweeney
- Rooney Sweeney
- Sweigert
- Pop Swett

== T ==
- John Taber
- Jesse Tannehill
- Billy Taylor - 3B
- Billy Taylor - P
- Dummy Taylor
- Harry Taylor
- Jack Taylor - P (1890s)
- Jack Taylor - P (1900s)
- Live Oak Taylor
- Sandy Taylor
- Zachary Taylor
- George Tebeau
- Patsy Tebeau
- Pussy Tebeau
- John K. Tener
- Fred Tenney 1B
- Fred Tenney OF
- Tom Terrell
- Adonis Terry
- Walter Terry
- Al Thake
- Roy Thomas
- Tom Thomas
- Art Thompson
- Frank Thompson
- Sam Thompson
- Tug Thompson
- Will Thompson
- John Thornton
- Walter Thornton
- Mike Tiernan
- Bill Tierney
- John Tilley
- Jim Tipper
- Ledell Titcomb
- Bill Tobin
- Frank Todd
- Phil Tomney
- Steve Toole
- George Townsend
- Jim Toy
- Bill Traffley
- John Traffley
- Jim Tray
- Fred Treacey
- Pete Treacey
- George Treadway
- George Trenwith
- Sam Trott
- Dasher Troy
- Fred Truax
- Harry Truby
- Ed Trumbull
- Tommy Tucker
- Jerry Turbidy
- Tuck Turner
- Art Twineham
- Larry Twitchell
- Jim Tyng

== U ==
- George Ulrich
- Fred Underwood

== V ==
- Gene Vadeboncoeur
- Bob Valentine
- John Valentine
- Bill Van Dyke
- George Van Haltren
- Dick Van Zant
- Farmer Vaughn
- Peek-A-Boo Veach
- Lee Viau
- Tom Vickery
- Bill Vinton
- Jake Virtue
- Joe Visner
- Tony Von Fricken
- Alex Voss

== W ==
- Rube Waddell
- Jack Wadsworth
- Woody Wagenhorst
- Butts Wagner
- Honus Wagner
- Charlie Waitt
- Moses Fleetwood Walker
- George Walker
- Oscar Walker
- Walt Walker
- Welday Walker
- Howard Wall
- Bobby Wallace
- Joe Walsh
- Jim Ward
- John Ward OF
- John Ward P
- John Montgomery Ward
- Piggy Ward
- Fred Warner
- Jack Warner
- Fred Waterman
- Bill Watkins
- Mother Watson
- Farmer Weaver
- Sam Weaver
- Charlie Weber
- Harry Weber
- Joe Weber
- Pete Weckbecker
- Stump Weidman
- Podge Weihe
- Curt Welch
- Mickey Welch
- Tub Welch
- Jake Wells
- Jack Wentz
- Perry Werden
- Joe Werrick
- Billy West
- Buck West
- Frank West
- Huyler Westervelt
- George Wetzel
- Gus Weyhing
- John Weyhing
- George Wheeler
- Harry Wheeler
- Bobby Wheelock
- Bill White
- Deacon White
- Elmer White
- Warren White
- Will White
- William Edward White
- Art Whitney
- Lew Whistler
- Pat Whitaker
- Bill White (1B)
- Bill White (SS)
- Deacon White
- Deke White
- Elmer White
- Warren White
- Will White
- Milt Whitehead
- Guerdon Whiteley
- Charles Witherow
- Ed Whiting
- Art Whitney
- Frank Whitney
- Jim Whitney
- Bill Whitrock
- Wild Bill Widner
- Joseph Wiley
- Harry Wilhelm
- Dale Williams
- Gus Williams
- Jimmy Williams
- Pop Williams
- Tom Williams
- Ned Williamson
- Julius Willigrod
- Vic Willis
- Wills
- Dave Wills
- Walt Wilmot
- Bill Wilson
- Henry Wilson
- Highball Wilson
- Parke Wilson
- Tug Wilson
- Zeke Wilson
- George Winkelman
- George Winkleman
- Bill Wise
- Nick Wise
- Sam Wise
- Joe Woerlin
- Jimmy Wolf
- Abe Wolstenholme
- Rynie Wolters
- Harry Wolverton
- Wood, first name unknown
- Bob Wood
- Fred Wood
- George Wood
- Jimmy Wood
- John Wood
- Pete Wood
- Fred Woodcock
- Red Woodhead
- Pete Woodruff
- Walt Woods
- Favel Wordsworth
- Herb Worth
- Jimmy Woulfe
- Bill Wright
- Dave Wright
- George Wright
- Harry Wright
- Joe Wright
- Pat Wright
- Rasty Wright
- Sam Wright
- Zeke Wrigley
- Ren Wylie
- Willis Wyman
- Bill Wynne

== Y ==
- Henry Yaik
- George Yeager
- Joe Yeager
- Bill Yeatman
- Bill Yerrick
- Ed Yewell
- Charlie Yingling
- Joe Yingling
- Tom York
- Gus Yost
- Cy Young
- J. B. Young
- Henry Youngman

== Z ==
- Fred Zahner
- William Zay
- Dave Zearfoss
- George Zettlein
- Charlie Ziegler
- George Ziegler
- Bill Zies
- Chief Zimmer
- Frank Zinn
