= 1845 to 1868 in baseball =

The following are the baseball events of the years 1845 to 1868 throughout the world.

== Events ==
- 1837 – The Gotham Club of New York is formed.
- 1845 Summer – The Knickerbocker Base Ball Club is formed by breakaway members of the New York or "Gotham" Club, headed by Duncan Curry, Alexander Cartwright and William R. Wheaton.
- 1845 September 10 – A baseball game is played that is described the following day in the New York Morning News, the earliest known game write-up.
- 1845 September 23 – The New York Knickerbockers draw up the earliest surviving set of baseball rules, the Knickerbocker Rules, which are written down by William R. Wheaton and William H. Tucker.
- 1845 October 11 – A club from Brooklyn defeats one from New York (i.e. Manhattan) at the Union Star Cricket Ground in Brooklyn, the home team winning 22–1. The game is reported in the New York Morning News and True Sun newspapers.
- 1845 October 21 – A second baseball game is played between the New York and Brooklyn clubs at the Elysian Fields, Hoboken, New Jersey, with New York prevailing 24–4, and the first known box score appears in the New York Morning News the following day.
- 1845 October 25 – The rubber game is played between New York and Brooklyn at the Union Star Cricket Ground, New York taking the game and the series by a score of 34–19.
- 1846 June 19 – The New York Knickerbockers play the "New York nine" at Elysian Fields, Hoboken, New Jersey. The Knickerbockers lose to the New Yorks by a score of 23–1 in four innings of play.
- 1850 April – The Eagle Club is formed. The Gotham Club is organized.
- 1852 – The Eagle Club publishes its rules.
- 1854 – The Knickerbocker, Gotham and Eagle clubs agree on a unified set of rules. The pitching distance is defined for the first time, as "not less than 15 paces."
- 1854 October 12 – The Empire club is formed in Manhattan but plays in Hoboken.
- 1854 December 8 – The Excelsior club established in South Brooklyn.
- 1855 – The Atlantic Club of Brooklyn is organized in Jamaica, Long Island.
- 1855 May 1 The Newark Club established in New Jersey.
- 1855 May – The Putnam Club established in Williamsburgh, Brooklyn.
- 1855 June 4 – The Baltic Club of New York formed.
- 1855 June 27 The Eckford club established in Greenpoint, Brooklyn.
- 1855 July 17 – The Union Club founded in Morrisania (now in the Bronx).
- 1855 October – The Continental Club organized in Williamsburgh, Brooklyn.
- 1856 March – The Harlem Club established.
- 1856 June 28 – The Enterprise club founded in Bedford.
- 1856 August 14 – The Atlantic of New York club established in Bedford.
- 1856 October – The Star club organized in South Brooklyn.
- 1857 – The Mutual Club is founded in Manhattan and the Adriatic Club in Newark, NJ.
- 1857 January – The Independent club founded in New York.
- 1857 January 22 and February 25 – The National Association of Base Ball Players (NABBP) is formed in meetings of sixteen New York area baseball clubs, and promulgates revised rules including nine-inning games, nine-man teams and 90 feet between the bases.
- 1857 March – The Liberty club established in New Brunswick.
- 1857 March 4 – The Metropolitan club organized in New York.
- 1857 March 14 – The Champion club organized in New York.
- 1857 March 23 – The Hamilton club established in Brooklyn.
- 1857 April 28 – The St. Nicholas club organized in Hoboken.
- 1858 – The first all-star games, and the first baseball games to charge admission, took place in Corona, Queens, New York, at the Fashion Race Course. The called strike is introduced.
- 1859 – The Potomac Club is formed in the summer and the National club in November in Washington, D.C.
- 1859 July 1 – Amherst College defeats Williams College in the first intercollegiate baseball game, 73–32.
- 1860 – Athletic of Philadelphia is formed. The Olympic Ball Club of Philadelphia changes from "Philadelphia rules" town ball to New York (NABBP) rules. The Eureka Club of Newark starts playing other teams in the NABBP. The Union Club of Lansingburgh team is formed, which would later become the Haymaker Club of Troy in the NABBP. The first baseball almanac, Beadle's Dime Base-Ball Player edited by Henry Chadwick, begins publication.
- 1860 February 22 – First recorded baseball game played in San Francisco, California between the San Francisco Eagles and the San Francisco Red Rovers.
- 1860 September 28 – The first baseball game reported between two named black teams. At Elysian Fields in Hoboken, New Jersey, the Weeksville of New York beat the Colored Union Club, 11–0.
- 1862 April – The Summit City Club is formed in Fort Wayne, Indiana (the club would reform as the Kekionga in 1866).
- 1864 – The called ball and base-on-balls are introduced.
- 1865 – The "fly rule" introduced: fair balls caught on the first bounce are no longer outs.
- 1865 August 30 – President Andrew Johnson welcomes the Atlantic and National clubs to the White House in the first documented case of the long-standing tradition of inviting successful sports teams to meet with the President.
- 1865 October – The Cream City Club of Milwaukee team is formed.
- 1866 – The Kekionga club is reformed in Fort Wayne after the end of the Civil War.
- 1866–1868 – The Forest City Club of Rockford, Illinois features future superstars Albert Spalding and Ross Barnes.
- 1866 June 23 – The Resolute Base Ball Club of Cincinnati, the future Red Stockings, is formed and plays four outside matches.
- 1867 – The Cincinnati Base Ball Club plays in the NABBP.

== Champions ==
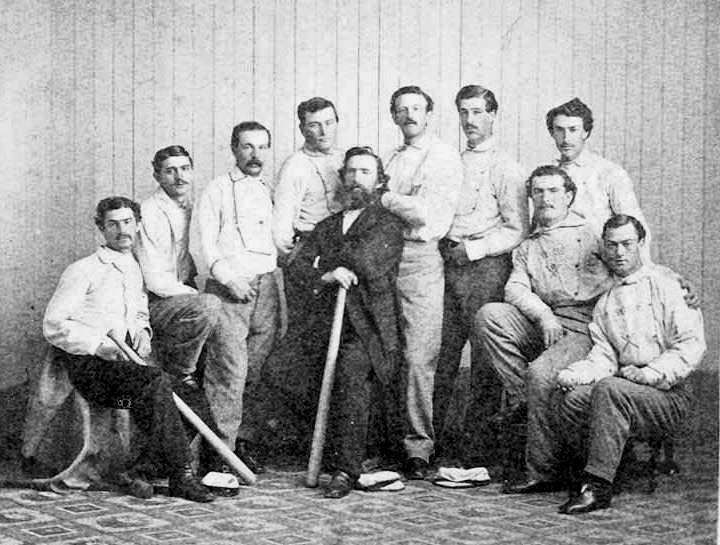
The Atlantic of Brooklyn, "Champions of America", 1865

- National Association of Base Ball Players:
  - 1857: Atlantic of Brooklyn
  - 1858: Mutual of New York
  - 1859: Atlantic of Brooklyn
  - 1860: Atlantic of Brooklyn
  - 1861: Atlantic of Brooklyn
  - 1862: Eckford of Brooklyn
  - 1863: Eckford of Brooklyn
  - 1864: Atlantic of Brooklyn
  - 1865: Atlantic of Brooklyn
  - 1866: Atlantic of Brooklyn
  - 1867: Union of Morrisania
  - 1868: Mutual of New York

== Season records ==
At its December 1868 annual meeting, the National Association of Base Ball Players (NABBP) permitted professional clubs. Twelve existing members did "go pro" and constitute the professional field for 1869.

=== 1868 records of major clubs ===
Marshall Wright publishes 1868 season records for 98 teams, many of them incomplete ("(inc)" in the table). Bill Ryczek calls 15 of that season's teams "major" (not marked). This table covers all of those "majors" (not marked), all of the 1869 "pros" (*), all 14 member clubs with at least twelve wins on record, and a few others. For the seven listed clubs in Greater New York, no city is named in the first column; the comment gives their locales.

Club, City	W	L	T		comment
Atlantic	47	7		*	Brooklyn
Athletic, Philadelphia	47	3		*
Union	37	6		(inc)	Morrisania, New York
Cincinnati "Red Stockings"	36	7		*
Mutual	31	10		*	New York
Eckford	23	12		*	Brooklyn
Buckeye, Cincinnati	21	5		(inc)
Union, Lansingburgh	15	5		*	the "Troy Haymakers"
Champion	14	7			Jersey City, New Jersey
Harvard, Cambridge	14	2			the college team
National, Albany	13	8
Olympic, Washington	12	11	1	*
Tri-Mountain, Boston	12	9		(inc)
Maryland, Baltimore	12	6		*
—
Forest City, Cleveland	11	11	1	*
Lowell, Boston	11	9
Forest City, Rockford	11	4
Star	9	10			Brooklyn
Excelsior, Chicago	7	8	1	(inc)
National, Washington	7	3		*
Keystone, Philadelphia	5	10	1	(inc) *
Irvington	2	6		(inc) *	Irvington, New Jersey

At least four Association clubs not listed here would someday try professionalism: Riverside of Portsmouth, Ohio (1870); Kekionga of Fort Wayne, Indiana (1871); Middletown of Mansfield, Connecticut (1872); Resolute of Elizabeth, New Jersey (1873).

Meanwhile, only two brand new professional baseball clubs would be established in the next three years, the Chicago White Stockings for 1870 and the Boston Red Stockings for 1871. Their commercial origins may be related to their survival alone by 1877, and on to 2010, while all of their rivals with older and amateur roots fell away.

=== 1867 records of major clubs ===
Marshall Wright publishes 1867 season records for 89 teams, many of them incomplete ("(inc)" in the table). Bill Ryczek calls 17 of that season's teams "major" (not marked). This table covers all of those "majors", all 13 member clubs with at least fourteen wins on record, and a few others. For the nine listed clubs in Greater New York, no city is named in the first column; the comment gives their locales.

Club, City	W	L	T		comment
Athletic, Philadelphia	44	3		*
National, Washington	29	7		*
Quaker City, Philadelphia	28	9			maybe a one-season club
Mutual	23	6	1	*	New York
Keystone, Philadelphia	21	6	1	*
Union	21	8			Morrisania, New York
Atlantic	19	5	1	*	Brooklyn
Geary, Philadelphia	19	6
Tri-Mountain, Boston	19	3
Cincinnati "Red Stockings"	17	1		*
Irvington	16	7		*	Irvington, New Jersey
Oriental	15	3			Greenpoint, New York
Union, Lansingburgh	14	7		*	the "Troy Haymakers"
—
Excelsior	11	5			Brooklyn
Olympic, Washington	11	5		*
Harvard, Cambridge	11	2			the college team
Excelsior, Chicago	10	1
Lowell, Boston	8	5		(inc)
Buckeye, Cincinnati	7	8
Eckford	6	16	1	*	Brooklyn
Star	6	4		(inc)	Brooklyn
West Philadelphia, Phila.	5	12		(inc)
Eureka	3	8		(inc)	Newark NJ

Star (*) marks ten clubs among twelve who would go pro in 1869. Excelsior of Chicago and Buckeye of Cincinnati are listed because they were probably the strongest teams in the west after the Cincinnati Red Stockings.

=== 1866 records of major clubs ===
Marshall Wright publishes 1866 season records for 58 of 93 association members, said to be complete for games between two member clubs. Bill Ryczek calls 20 of that season's teams "major" including three old New York rivals of the Knickerbockers.

This table covers all of those "majors", all 14 members with at least eight wins on record, and a few others. For the fifteen listed clubs in Greater New York, no city is named in the first column; the comment gives their locales.

Club, City	W	L	T		comment
Union	25	3			Morrisania, New York
Athletic, Philadelphia	23	2		*
Atlantic	17	3		*	Brooklyn
Excelsior	13	6	1		Brooklyn
Active	10	6			New York
National, Washington	10	5		*
Mutual	10	2		*	New York
Eckford	9	8		*	Brooklyn
Eureka	9	7			Newark, New Jersey
Enterprise	9	6			Brooklyn
Irvington	9	6		*	Irvington, New Jersey
Mohawk	9	3			Brooklyn
Star	8	6			Brooklyn
Americus	8	5			Newark, New Jersey
—
Keystone, Philadelphia	5	5	1	*
Empire	4	7			New York
Gotham	4	4			New York
Eagle	2	9			New York
Camden, Camden	2	5			Camden, New Jersey
Lowell, Boston	2	0
Harvard, Cambridge	1	5			the college team
Union, Lansingburgh				*	non-member; now in Troy, New York

Star (*) marks eight clubs among twelve who would go pro in 1869, three seasons later.

=== 1865 and earlier clubs ===
For the preceding 1865 season Marshall Wright lists 30 members with supposedly complete records for most of them. Twenty-two of the thirty were in Greater New York. Bill Ryczek calls 19 teams "major" in the first season that he covers: sixteen of the members and three others (Lowell, Harvard, and Camden).

No one traveled much and membership was still depressed by the Civil War. There had been 59 delegates at the March 1860 annual meeting, and 55 at the next annual meeting that December (on a new baseball calendar), who thereby intended to play during the 1861 season that the war curtailed. Nine of 59 and eleven of 55 were from outside Greater New York.

== Births ==
=== 1840s ===
- 1847
  - January 28 – George Wright
  - December 7 – Deacon White
- 1848
  - October [?] – Wally Goldsmith
  - October 18 – Candy Cummings
- 1849
  - April 1 – John McMullin

=== 1850s ===
- 1850

Date of birth missing

  - Bill Allison
  - Robert Armstrong
  - Ned Connor
  - Dickie Flowers
  - Tom Miller
  - William Rexter
  - January [?] – John Glenn
  - February 7 – Mike Hooper
  - March 26 – Morrie Critchley
  - April [?] – Wallace Terry
  - April 8 – John Peters
  - April 12 – Sandy Nava
  - May 8 – Ross Barnes
  - June 12 – John Stedronsky
  - June 13 – Bobby Clack
  - July 13 – Tom York
  - July 14 – Jim Holdsworth
  - June 23 – George Bird
  - July 24 – Joe Miller
  - July 26 – Tricky Nichols
  - August [?] – Tommy Beals
  - August 1 – Michael Campbell
  - August 10 – Jim Clinton
  - August 23 – Fred Andrus
  - August 31 – Gene Kimball
  - September 1 – Jim O'Rourke
  - September 2 – Albert Spalding
  - October 3 – Al Nevin
  - October 29 – George Ewell
  - November 22 – Favel Wordsworth
  - November 23 – Cy Bentley
  - November 30 – Alamazoo Jennings
  - December 25 – Fraley Rogers
- 1851
  - September 11- Mike Golden
  - October [?] – Orator Shafer
- 1852
  - February 5 – Charlie Hautz
  - March 27 – Ed Cushman
  - April 17 – Cap Anson
  - April 30 – Charley Jones
  - August 22 – Martin Mullen
  - December 10 – Frank Bliss
- 1853
- 1854
  - September 8 – Russ McKelvy
  - November 4 – John Abadie
  - December 11 – Charles Radbourn
- 1855
  - March 21 – William Coon
  - October 2 – Jack Allen
  - October 2 – John Carbine
- 1856
  - October 1 – John E. Bruce
  - December 25 – Pud Galvin
- 1857
  - January 1 – Tim Keefe
  - July 1 – Roger Connor
  - August 20 – George Baker
  - August 22 – Ned Hanlon
  - October 7 – Moxie Hengel
  - October 19 – Tom Poorman
  - December 31 – King Kelly
- 1858

Date of birth missing

  - January 1 – John Doyle
  - May 8 – Dan Brouthers
  - May 25 – Tip O'Neill
  - August 19 – Phil Coridan
  - September 11 – Mike DePangher
  - October 15 – J. R. Malone
- 1859
  - January 30 – Tony Mullane, Irish-American baseball player and manager (d. 1944)
  - July [?] – Tony Murphy
  - July 4 – Mickey Welch
  - July 8 – Hank O'Day
  - August 15 – Charles Comiskey
  - September 29 – Dave Orr
  - October 17 – Buck Ewing
  - October 26 – Frank Selee
  - November 1 – Bid McPhee

=== 1860–1868 ===
- 1860
  - June 26 – Al Strueve
  - August 27 – Scrappy Carroll
  - August 29 – Buck West
- 1861
  - August 28 – Charlie Reising
- 1862
  - March 3 – Jumbo Schoeneck
  - July 14 – Law Daniels
  - December 22 – Connie Mack
- 1863
  - May 25 – John Hofford
  - July 16 – John B. Foster
  - October 25 – Bill Shettsline
- 1864
  - April 17 – Jersey Bakley
  - June [?] – John Cuff
  - August 7 – Adonis Terry
  - October 25 – John Godar
- 1865
  - January 6 – Sun Daly
  - May 4 – Chuck Lauer
  - May [?] – Fred Smith
  - June 30 – Tim Hurst
  - July 19 – Jim Donnelly
- 1866
  - January 5 – William B. Hanna
  - March 12 – Denny Lyons
  - March 25 – Larry McKeon
  - April 20 – Pat Hannivan
  - August 26 – Ledell Titcomb
  - September 4 – Elmer Horton
  - September 16 – Joe Vila
  - November 28 – Sy Sanborn
- 1867
  - March 29 – Cy Young
  - August 5 – Jacob Ruppert
  - October 7 – Brickyard Kennedy
- 1868
  - Date of birth missing

Jim Adams
Frank Knauss
Sparrow McCaffrey
Ambrose McGann
Ed Pabst
Jim Powers
Kid Summers
Fred Truax

  - January [?] – Tom Letcher
  - January 1 – Dave Zearfoss
  - January 9 – Harley Payne
  - January 11 – Silver King
  - January 12 – Dan Daub
  - January 14 – John Newell
  - January 15 – Jock Menefee
  - January 28 – Dan Sweeney
  - January 30 – General Stafford
  - February 13 – Biff Sheehan
  - February 19 – Sal Campfield
  - February 22 – George Davies
  - February 23 – Lew Camp
  - March 10 – Lew Whistler
  - March 10 – Theodore Conover
  - March 13 – Bill Gilbert
  - March 15 – Roscoe Coughlin
  - March 19 – Skyrocket Smith
  - March 23 – Mike Smith
  - March 25 – Frank Dwyer
  - March 31 – Jack Stivetts
  - April [?] – Warren Fitzgerald
  - April 2 – Frank Boyd
  - April 6 – Walt Preston
  - April 10 – Tom Parrott
  - April 25 – Fred Hartman
  - May [?] – Will Calihan
  - May 1 – Pete Allen
  - May 9 – Josh Reilly
  - May 10 – Ed Barrow
  - May 17 – Fred Woodcock
  - May 28 – John Bates
  - June [?] – George Hodson
  - June [?] – Ed Knouff
  - June [?] – Bob Miller
  - June 7 – Mike Ryan
  - June 12 – Sol White
  - June 27 – Bill Daley
  - June 28 – John Taber
  - July 5 – Pat Wright
  - July 7 – Willard Mains
  - July 8 – Harry H. Gilbert
  - July 18 – Tony Madigan
  - July 24 – Billy Graulich
  - July 29 – George Rettger
  - August 11 – Dan O'Connor
  - August 12 – Charlie Bell
  - August 12 – Jerry Harrington
  - August 31 – Red Ehret
  - September [?] – Jeremiah Reardon
  - September 1 – Mike O'Rourke
  - September 2 – Al Sauter
  - September 10 – Dusty Miller
  - September 11 – Steve Brodie
  - September 15 – Frank O'Connor
  - September 21 – Joe Daly
  - October [?] – Bobby Cargo
  - October [?] – Tom Cahill
  - October 6 – Whitey Gibson
  - October 10 – Dave Anderson
  - October 10 – Ad Gumbert
  - October 14 – Fred Underwood
  - October 18 – Boileryard Clarke
  - October 22 – Charlie Weber
  - October 25 – Dan Burke
  - November 2 – Jim McCormick
  - November 5 – Charlie Newman
  - November 7 – Julie Freeman
  - November 9 – Bill Phillips
  - November 12 – Bill Gleason
  - November 12 – Jack Ryan
  - November 17 – Ezra Lincoln
  - December [?] – Bill Sullivan
  - December 1 – George Fox
  - December 4 – Jesse Burkett
  - December 5 – Frank Bowerman
  - December 8 – Jocko Halligan
  - December 10 – Neil Stynes
  - December 11 – Tom Gettinger
  - December 13 – Bill Everitt
  - December 15 – George Hemming

== Deaths ==
=== 1860s ===
- 1862
  - October 18 – Jim Creighton
