= 1875 Brooklyn Atlantics season =

1875 Brooklyn Atlantics
- League: National Association of Professional Base Ball Players
- Ballpark: Union Grounds
- City: Brooklyn, New York
- Record: 2–42 (.045)
- League place: 7th
- Managers: Charlie Pabor, Bill Boyd

The Brooklyn Atlantics played in 1875 as a member of the National Association of Professional Base Ball Players. They finished eleventh in the league with a record of 2–42. The league folded at the conclusion of the season, and the Atlantics did not join the National League which succeeded it in 1876.

== Regular season ==
=== Season standings ===
National Association	W	L	T	Pct.	GB
Boston Red Stockings	71	8	3	.884	—
Philadelphia Athletics	53	20	4	.714	15
Hartford Dark Blues	54	28	3	.653	18½
St. Louis Brown Stockings	39	29	2	.571	26½
Philadelphia White Stockings	37	31	2	.543	28½
Chicago White Stockings	30	37	2	.449	35
New York Mutuals	30	38	3	.444	35½
New Haven Elm Citys	7	40	—	.149	48
Washington Nationals	5	23	—	.179	40½
St. Louis Red Stockings	4	15	—	.211	37
Philadelphia Centennials	2	12	—	.143	36½
Brooklyn Atlantics	2	42	—	.045	51½
Keokuk Westerns	1	12	—	.077	37

=== Record vs. opponents ===
1875 National Association Records Sources:
Team	BOS	BR	CHI	HAR	KEO	NH	NY	PHA	PHC	PWS	SLB	SLR	WSH
Boston	—	6–0	8–2	9–1	1–0	5–1	10–0	8–2–2	4–0	6–0–1	7–2	1–0	6–0
Brooklyn	0–6	—	0–2	0–10	0–0	2–1	0–7	0–7	0–0	0–7	0–2	0–0	0–0
Chicago	2–8	2–0	—	4–6–1	4–0	2–1	3–3	1–7–1	0–0	3–7	5–5	4–0	0–0
Hartford	1–9	10–0	6–4–1	—	0–0	8–1	8–2–2	4–3–1	1–0	4–4	5–5	3–0	4–0
Keokuk	0–1	0–0	0–4	0–0	—	0–0	0–1	0–0	0–0	0–0	0–4	1–2	0–0
New Haven	1–5	1–2	1–2	1–8	0–0	—	1–5	0–7	0–1	0–4	1–2	0–0	1–4
New York	0–10	7–0	3–3	2–8–2	1–0	5–1	—	3–6	2–0	5–2	0–8–1	2–0	0–0
Philadelphia Athletics	2–8–2	7–0	7–1–1	3–4–1	0–0	7–0	6–3	—	2–1	8–2	6–1	0–0	5–0
Philadelphia Centennials	0–4	0–0	0–0	0–1	0–0	1–0	0–2	1–2	—	0–3	0–0	0–0	0–0
Philadelphia White Stockings	0–6–1	7–0	7–3	4–4	0–0	4–0	2–5	2–8	3–0	—	5–5–1	1–0	2–0
St. Louis Brown Stockings	2–7	2–0	5–5	5–5	4–0	2–1	8–0–1	1–6	0–0	5–5–1	—	2–0	3–0
St. Louis Red Stockings	0–1	0–0	0–4	0–3	2–1	0–0	0–2	0–0	0–0	0–1	0–2	—	2–1
Washington	0–6	0–0	0–0	0–4	0–0	4–1	0–0	0–5	0–0	0–2	0–3	1–2	—

=== Roster ===
1875 Brooklyn Atlantics
Roster
Pitchers: John Cassidy; Jim Clinton; Hugh O'Neil; Catchers: Doc Bushong; Frank Fleet; Hugh Gilgan; Jake Knowdell	Infielders: John Abadie; Tom Barlow; Boland; Bill Boyd; Oliver Brown; Thomas Crane; Hellings; Henry Kessler; Molly Moore; Horatio Munn; Al Nichols; Tom Patterson; D. Smith; Oscar Walker	Outfielders: Harry Arundel; Bobby Clack; John Dailey; Edwards; Washington Fulmer; Hugh Gilgan; Al Martin; Pat McGee; Charlie Pabor; Quinn; William Rexter; Shaffer; Sheridan; Stoddard; Frank Thompson	Managers: Bill Boyd; Charlie Pabor

== Player stats ==
=== Batting ===
Note: G = Games played; AB = At bats; H = Hits; Avg. = Batting average; HR = Home runs; RBI = Runs batted in

Player	G	AB	H	Avg.	HR	RBI
Jake Knowdell	43	163	32	.196	0	9
Thomas Crane	21	81	17	.210	0	4
Frank Fleet	26	111	25	.225	0	9
Henry Kessler	25	105	26	.248	0	7
Al Nichols	32	131	20	.153	0	9
Bill Boyd	36	151	44	.291	1	10
Charlie Pabor	42	153	36	.235	0	11
Bobby Clack	17	59	6	.102	0	1
Molly Moore	21	86	19	.221	0	5
Pat McGee	18	65	10	.154	0	5
Tom Patterson	12	45	9	.200	0	4
Hugh O'Neil	7	26	2	.077	0	1
Al Martin	6	26	3	.115	0	1
D. Smith	3	13	1	.077	0	1
Oliver Brown	3	10	0	.000	0	0
Stoddard	2	9	1	.111	0	0
Hugh Gilgan	2	8	2	.250	0	0
John Dailey	2	8	1	.125	0	0
Doc Bushong	1	5	3	.600	0	0
Frank Thompson	1	5	2	.400	0	1
Edwards	1	5	1	.200	0	0
Shaffer	1	4	0	.000	0	0
John Abadie	1	4	1	.250	0	1
Horatio Munn	1	4	0	.000	0	0
Washington Fulmer	1	4	2	.500	0	1
Boland	1	4	0	.000	0	0
Hellings	1	4	1	.250	0	0
Tom Barlow	1	4	0	.000	0	0
William Rexter	1	4	0	.000	0	0
Sheridan	1	4	0	.000	0	0
Harry Arundel	1	4	0	.000	0	0
Oscar Walker	1	2	0	.000	0	0

=== Pitching ===
==== Starting pitchers ====
Note: G = Games pitched; IP = Innings pitched; W = Wins; L = Losses; ERA = Earned run average; SO = Strikeouts

Player	G	IP	W	L	ERA	SO
John Cassidy	30	213.2	1	21	3.03	9
Jim Clinton	17	123.0	1	13	2.41	7
Hugh O'Neil	5	34.0	0	4	5.03	0
Frank Fleet	2	15.1	0	1	4.70	0
Charlie Pabor	1	4.0	0	1	9.00	0
Harry Arundel	1	2.1	0	1	7.71	0
Edwards	1	2.0	0	1	4.50	0

==== Relief pitchers ====
Note: G = Games pitched; W = Wins; L = Losses; SV = Saves; ERA = Earned run average; SO = Strikeouts

Player	G	W	L	SV	ERA	SO
Bill Boyd	1	0	0	0	0.00	0
