= Chick Fulmer =

American baseball player (1851–1940)

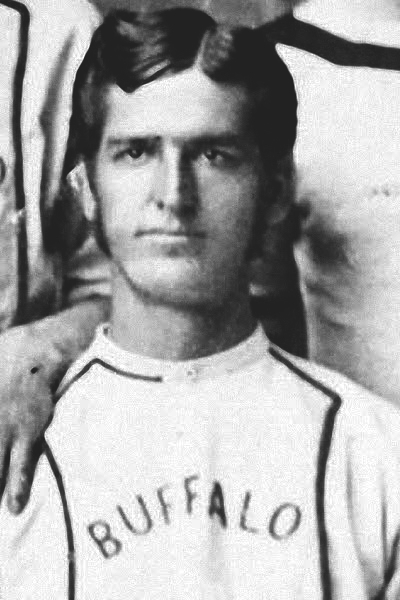
- Shortstop
- Born: February 13, 1851; Philadelphia, Pennsylvania, U.S.
- Died: February 15, 1940 (aged 89); Philadelphia, Pennsylvania, U.S.
- Batted: Right Threw: Right

Major league debut
- June 5, 1871, for the Rockford Forest Citys

Last major league appearance
- August 16, 1884, for the St. Louis Browns

Major league statistics
- Batting average: .260
- Home runs: 8
- RBI: 262
- Stats at Baseball Reference

Teams
- National Association of Base Ball Players Olympic of Philadelphia (1868) Keystone of Philadelphia (1869) Cleveland Forest Citys (1870) League player Rockford Forest Citys (1871) New York Mutuals (1872) Philadelphia White Stockings (1873–1875) Louisville Grays (1876) Buffalo Bisons (1879–1880) Cincinnati Red Stockings (1882–1884) St. Louis Browns (1884)

Charles John "Chick" Fulmer (February 13, 1851 – February 15, 1940) was an American amateur and professional baseball player who played in the major leagues (Note: Fulmer played the first five years of his major league career in the National Association—the status of the National Association as a major league has been a point of some disagreement among baseball historians.) between 1871 and 1884. He was a journeyman who played for seven major league teams: the Rockford Forest Citys, New York Mutuals, Philadelphia White Stockings, Louisville Grays, Buffalo Bisons, Cincinnati Red Stockings, and St. Louis Browns. His brother Washington Fulmer played a single game at the major league level.

== Early life ==
Fulmer was born in Philadelphia, and he came from a family of soldiers. His father Michael was a major in the Union Army before becoming a butcher in Philadelphia. Fulmer's grandfather John fought in the American Revolution, and his great-grandfather Michael was involved in the French and Indian War. Fulmer tried to serve in the Civil War himself by joining the Southwark Guards, but he was 14 years old and he was sent home before he saw any battle.

== Career ==
Fulmer made his major league debut for the Rockford Forest Citys in 1871, the first year that games were played in the National Association of Professional Base Ball Players. He played for the league's New York Mutuals in 1872 before moving on to a three-year stint with the Philadelphia White Stockings. He claimed that he executed the first major league unassisted triple play in 1873, but this has not been documented outside of his story. The league folded after the 1875 season.

In 1876, Fulmer received his only opportunity to manage at the major league level; he was a player-manager for the Louisville Grays in the first year of the National League's existence. The team finished 30–36. He played in the minor leagues for a couple of seasons before his Buffalo Bisons were admitted to the National League in 1879. He stayed with Buffalo in 1880, but he struggled to hit and he did not play much.

Before the 1881 season, there was talk that Fulmer would be signed by the Detroit Wolverines, but manager Frank Bancroft ultimately signed another player to fill his infield needs. Fulmer decided to sit out of baseball for a year, becoming the manager of a traveling theater troupe that staged productions of Uncle Tom's Cabin. He returned to baseball for three years in the American Association, playing with teams in Cincinnati and St. Louis. In 1882, he executed a triple play against Pittsburgh. His last professional playing appearances were in 1885 with a minor league team in Portland, Maine.

== Later life ==
Fulmer came back to Philadelphia after his baseball career was over and he stayed there for the rest of his life. He worked as a magistrate, despite not having a college education or legal training. Later, he was a doorman for the Curtis Publishing Company in the Center City district. At age 82, Fulmer appeared at and was recognized at National League Park on May 1, 1933, as part of the team's celebration of its fiftieth anniversary in the National League.

Fulmer suffered a stroke in the late 1930s and he died in 1940. He was interred at Fernwood Cemetery in Fernwood, Pennsylvania. He was survived by his wife, Annie; they had married 65 years earlier. Fulmer's brother, Washington Fulmer, who played in one game for the hapless 1875 Brooklyn Atlantics, preceded him in death by more than 30 years. At the time of his death he had been the last living player from the 1873 season.
