= 1866 in sports =

1866 in sports describes the year's events in world sport.

== Association football ==
Events

- Foundation of Upton Park F.C.

== Athletics ==
Events

- The Amateur Athletics Club (AAC) is founded and becomes the governing body of athletics in the United Kingdom, hosting the first national championships and introducing a definition of "amateur" that will determine eligibility for athletics competitions until the late 20th century.

== Baseball ==
National championship

- National Association of Base Ball Players champion – Brooklyn Atlantics

Events

- National Association membership triples and geographic scope explodes, from Fort Leavenworth, Kansas to Portland, Maine. The association hears cases of professionalism at the center and there is no longer a clear and official NABBP champion.

== Boxing ==
Events

- 6 August — Jem Mace defeats Joe Goss in the 21st round and reclaims the vacant English Championship.
- 19 September — Mike McCoole defeats Bill Davis in the 34th round at Rhodes Point, near St Louis, and underlines his claim to the American Championship. The third claimant Jimmy Elliott does not fight anyone this year.

== Cricket ==
Events

- George Wootton's tally of 119 wickets establishes a new record for an English season.

England

- Most runs – Harry Jupp 1,140 @ 31.66 (HS 165)
- Most wickets – George Wootton 119 @ 14.09 (BB 8–69)

== Golf ==
Major tournaments

- British Open – Willie Park senior

== Horse racing ==
Events

- Inaugural running of the Irish Derby Stakes at The Curragh is won by Selim

England

- Grand National – Salamander
- 1,000 Guineas Stakes – Repulse
- 2,000 Guineas Stakes – Lord Lyon
- The Derby – Lord Lyon
- The Oaks – Tormentor
- St. Leger Stakes – Lord Lyon

Australia

- Melbourne Cup – The Barb

Canada

- Queen's Plate – Beacon

Ireland

- Irish Derby Stakes – Selim

== Rowing ==
The Boat Race

- 24 March — Oxford wins the 23rd Oxford and Cambridge Boat Race

== Rugby football ==
Events

- Foundation of Harlequins FC, Rochdale Hornets and Swinton RLFC

== Yacht racing ==
The American schooners Vesta, Henrietta and Fleetwing cross the Atlantic Ocean from Sandy Hook to the Needles, Isle of Wight in the first organised offshore race. The Henrietta, owned by 21-year-old James Gordon Bennett, Jr., and captained by Samuel S. Samuels won the race in 13 days, 21 hours and 55 minutes.
