= Pat McGee =

Pat McGee is the name of:

- Patricia McGee (1934–2005), American politician
- Pat McGee (born 1973), American singer-songwriter and the frontman for Pat McGee Band
- Pat McGee, drummer of Stars (Canadian band)
- Pat McGee (baseball) (died 1889), baseball player
- Patti McGee (born 1945), skateboarder
