= Charlie Lowe =

American baseball player

- Second baseman
- Born: Baltimore, Maryland
- Batted: Unknown Threw: Unknown

MLB debut
- September 24, 1872, for the Brooklyn Atlantics

Last MLB appearance
- October 31, 1872, for the Brooklyn Atlantics

MLB statistics
- Batting average: .161
- Runs scored: 1
- RBIs: 3
- Stats at Baseball Reference

Teams
- Brooklyn Atlantics (1872)

Charles Lowe was a professional baseball player who played second base for the 1872 Brooklyn Atlantics team of the NAPBBP. He played in seven games for the Atlantics during the season.
