= Tom Patterson (baseball) =

American baseball player (1845–1900)

- Outfielder
- Born: c. 1845; New York, New York, U.S.
- Died: May 31, 1900 (aged 54–55); New York, New York, U.S.
- Batted: Unknown Threw: Left

MLB debut
- May 18, 1871, for the New York Mutuals

Last MLB appearance
- September 6, 1875, for the Brooklyn Atlantics

MLB statistics
- Batting average: .210
- Runs scored: 42
- Runs batted in: 22

Teams
- New York Mutuals (1871); Brooklyn Eckfords (1872); New York Mutuals (1874); Brooklyn Atlantics (1875)

Thomas W. H. Patterson (c. 1845 – May 31, 1900) was an American Major League Baseball outfielder. He played in the majors in 1871–1872, and 1874–1875.

== Sources ==
- Baseball Reference
