= Jim Snyder (shortstop) =

American baseball player (1847–1922)

- Shortstop
- Born: September 15, 1847; Brooklyn, New York, U.S.
- Died: December 1, 1922 (aged 75); Rockaway Beach, Queens, New York, U.S.
- Batted: Unknown Threw: Unknown

MLB debut
- May 7, 1872, for the Brooklyn Eckfords

Last MLB appearance
- October 5, 1872, for the Brooklyn Eckfords

MLB statistics
- Games played: 26
- Runs scored: 16
- Hits: 28
- Batting average: .262
- Stats at Baseball Reference

Teams
- National Association of Base Ball Players Brooklyn Eckfords (1870) National Association of Professional BBP Brooklyn Eckfords (1872)

James C. A. Snyder (September 15, 1847 – December 1, 1922) was an American professional baseball player. In the National Association he was the regular shortstop of the 1872 Brooklyn Eckfords.

Snyder previously played for the Eckfords in the second of their four professional seasons, 1870. While the team won 2, tied 1, and lost 12 pro matches, he was a catcher and shortstop. Overall, he appeared in 19 games on record, two fewer than the team leaders, and he was a weak batter in the company of his teammates.
