= Al Martin (second baseman) =

American baseball player (1847–1915)

- Second baseman
- Born: September 1847; New York City, U.S.
- Died: March 17, 1915 (aged 67); Brooklyn, New York, U.S.
- Batted: Unknown Threw: Unknown

MLB debut
- May 7, 1872, for the Brooklyn Eckfords

Last MLB appearance
- September 25, 1875, for the Brooklyn Atlantics

MLB statistics
- Games played: 17
- Runs scored: 4
- Hits: 12
- Batting average: .164
- Stats at Baseball Reference

Teams
- National Association of Base Ball Players Union of Morrisania (1866–1868) National Association of Professional BBP Brooklyn Eckfords (1872) Brooklyn Atlantics (1874–1875)

Albert DeGroot Martin (September 1847 – March 17, 1915) was an American professional baseball player who played second base and outfield for the 1872 Brooklyn Eckfords and the 1874–1875 Brooklyn Atlantics. He was also known as Albert May.

He was later a bookkeeper. He married Emily Augusta Peverelly on May 26, 1873, at the South Dutch Church in Brooklyn.

He died at his home in Brooklyn, 76 Van Buren Street, in 1915.
