= Herb Worth =

American baseball player (1847–1914)

- Outfielder
- Born: May 2, 1847; Brooklyn, New York, U.S.
- Died: April 27, 1914 (aged 66); Brooklyn, New York, U.S.
- Batted: Unknown Threw: Unknown

MLB debut
- July 29, 1872, for the Brooklyn Atlantics

Last MLB appearance
- July 29, 1872, for the Brooklyn Atlantics

MLB statistics
- Batting average: .200
- Runs scored: 1
- RBIs: 1
- Stats at Baseball Reference

Teams
- National Association of Base Ball Players Star of Brooklyn (1866–1870) National Association of Professional BBP Brooklyn Atlantics (1872)

Herbert Worth (May 2, 1847 – April 27, 1914) was an American baseball player at the dawn of the professional era. He played primarily for the amateur Star club of Brooklyn, New York, and served as captain. He went on to work in the sugar refining industry, working for B. H. Howell & Co. of Manhattan and as president of the John Birkbeck Sugar Refining Company of South Brooklyn.

On July 29, 1872, he played one game in the outfield of the Brooklyn Atlantics, in the National Association of Professional Base Ball Players, the first professional league now in its second season. He was 1 for 4 with a double, one run scored and one run batted in. He also umpired a National Association game on July 2, 1872.

On August 6, 1891, Worth appeared in a game for the Wall Street Club at Prospect Park, along with other former stars.
