= Molly Moore (baseball) =

American baseball player

- Infielder
- Born: Unknown
- Died: February 24, 1881; New York, New York
- Batted: Unknown Threw: Right

MLB debut
- June 30, 1875, for the Brooklyn Atlantics

Last MLB appearance
- October 9, 1875, for the Brooklyn Atlantics

MLB statistics
- At bats: 86
- RBI: 5
- Home runs: 0
- Batting average: .221
- Stats at Baseball Reference

Teams
- Brooklyn Atlantics (1875)

Maurice "Molly" Moore was an American professional baseball player who played infield for the 1875 Brooklyn Atlantics.
