= John Dailey (baseball) =

American baseball player and umpire (born 1853)

- Shortstop / Umpire
- Born: October 26, 1853; Brooklyn, New York, U.S.
- Died: Unknown
- Batted: Unknown Threw: Unknown

MLB debut
- April 29, 1875, for the Washington Nationals (NA)

Last MLB appearance
- July 19, 1875, for the Brooklyn Atlantics

MLB statistics
- At bats: 118
- Runs: 19
- Home runs: 0
- Batting average: .178
- Stats at Baseball Reference

Teams
- Washington Nationals (1875); Brooklyn Atlantics (1875)

John J. Dailey (October 26, 1853 – ?) was an American professional baseball player and umpire. He was the regular shortstop for the 1875 Washington Nationals and he played two July games for the Brooklyn Atlantics after the Nationals went out of business. After his playing career, Dailey umpired 12 games in the National League in 1882, and 25 games in the American Association – 23 in 1884 and 2 in 1889.
