= Hugh Gilgan =

Irish baseball player (1852–1887)

- Catcher/Right fielder
- Born: c. 1852; Ireland
- Died: June 17, 1887; New York, New York
- Batted: Unknown Threw: Unknown

Last appearance
- Brooklyn Atlantics

MLB statistics
- Games: 2
- At bats: 8
- Hits: 2
- Stats at Baseball Reference

Teams
- Brooklyn Atlantics (1875)

Hugh Gilgan (c. 1852 – June 17, 1887) was an Irish Major League Baseball player who played in two games for the Brooklyn Atlantics in 1875.

He collected two hits in eight at bats as a catcher and right fielder.
