= Hugh O'Neil (baseball) =

American baseball player

- Pitcher
- Born: Brooklyn, New York, U.S.
- Batted: Unknown Threw: Unknown

MLB debut
- August 20, 1875, for the Brooklyn Atlantics

Last MLB appearance
- October 9, 1875, for the Brooklyn Atlantics

MLB statistics
- Win–loss record: 0–4
- Earned run average: 5.03
- Strikeouts: 0
- Stats at Baseball Reference

Teams
- Brooklyn Atlantics (1875)

Hugh O'Neil (sometimes referred to as J. O'Neill) was an American professional baseball player who played pitcher for the 1875 Brooklyn Atlantics.
