= Ralph Ham =

American baseball player (1849–1905)

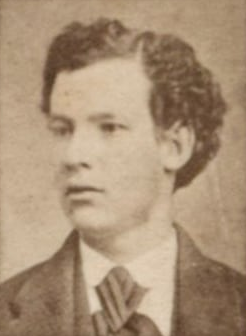
- Outfielder
- Born: March 1849; Troy, New York, United States
- Died: February 13, 1905 (aged 55); Troy, New York
- Batted: Unknown Threw: Unknown

Major league debut
- May 6, 1871, for the Rockford Forest Citys

Last major league appearance
- September 15, 1871, for the Rockford Forest Citys

Major league statistics
- Batting average: .248
- Home runs: 0
- RBI: 12
- Stats at Baseball Reference

Teams
- Rockford Forest Citys (1871)

Ralph A. Ham (March 1849 – February 13, 1905) was a professional baseball outfielder in the 19th century. He played for the Rockford Forest Citys of the National Association in 1871. He is known for committing 13 errors over the course of 19 games, which was most likely due to Rockford's home park, the Agricultural Society Fair Grounds, being unlevel.
