= National Association of Base Ball Players =

19th-century American baseball organization

The National Association of Base Ball Players (NABBP) was the first organization governing American baseball (spelled as two words in the 19th century).

The first convention of 16 New York City area clubs was held at Smith's Hotel, 462 Broome Street in January 1857. One delegate from each club had previously been assigned to a committee, whose task was to draw up a set of regulations governing the game. Their report was adopted at the final meeting of the convention on February 25, effectively bringing to an end the Knickerbocker era, when games were played under rules largely at the discretion of individual clubs. Besides governing the playing rules and its own organization, the Association established standards for official scoring (reporting), "match" play, a championship, amateurism, and the integrity of the contest (then known as hippodroming). Following trends in the evolution of the sport, in the 1869 season it accepted professionalism in its ranks.

The last convention, held in 1871, with hundreds of members represented only via state associations, provoked the establishment of separate professional and amateur associations. The succeeding National Association of Professional Base Ball Players is considered the first professional sports league; through 1875 it governed professional baseball and practically set playing rules for all. Because the amateur successor never attracted many members and it convened only a few times, the NABBP is sometimes called "the amateur Association" in contrast to its professional successor.

== Growth ==
Before the American Civil War (1861–1865), the beginnings of baseball competed for public interest with cricket and regional variants of baseball, notably town ball played in Philadelphia and the Massachusetts Game played in New England. In the 1860s, aided by the War, "New York" style baseball (as often played by Union Army troops passing the uneventful days of camp life between occasional skirmishes and battles) expanded through various corps, regiments, brigades, and other units into a national game. In addition, the parallel civilian NABBP, as its governing body, expanded into a true national organization, although most of the strongest clubs remained those based in New York City, Brooklyn and Philadelphia. By the end of 1865, almost 100 clubs were members of the "National Association" organization. By 1867, it had over 400 members, including some clubs from as far away as the Pacific Ocean west coast in San Francisco and south to the Gulf of Mexico coast in Louisiana. Because of this growth, regional and state organizations began to assume a more prominent role in the governance of the sport. Baseball's exploding popularity, however, was not confined to the NABBP organization, whose core lay in the vicinity of New York City; there were thousands of organized baseball clubs nationwide by 1870, the majority of which were not Association members. For example, on the eve of the Civil War there were no fewer than seven baseball teams in distant New Orleans, none of which belonged to the NABBP; a tabulation by historian Richard Herschberger turned up over 900 baseball clubs by 1860, in which year the Association's membership stood at 60.

== Professionalism ==
The NABBP was initially established upon principles of amateurism. However, even early in its history some star players, such as James Creighton of the Excelsior club of Brooklyn, received compensation, either secretly or through emoluments. In 1866, the NABBP investigated the Athletic club of Philadelphia for paying three players, including Lip Pike, but took no action against either the club or the players. However, as inter-club competition became more intense and clubs sought to secure the services of the best players, unofficial payments became common. To maintain the integrity of the game, at its December 1868 meeting the NABBP established a professional category for the coming 1869 season, and clubs who desired to pay players were now free to do so without sanction.

Cincinnati's Red Stockings was the first to so declare and was among the most aggressive in recruiting the best available players (as a result of which they became the most dominant club of the era). Twelve clubs, including most of the strongest in the NABBP, ultimately declared themselves professional for the 1869 season.

Conflict arose, however, between amateur and professional interests. Important issues included how the championship was to be decided and regulating players jumping from one team to another. As a result, after three years of this experiment, most of the leading professional clubs broke away in 1871 to found the separate National Association of Professional Base Ball Players (NAPBBP). The earlier NABBP continued for about two more years with a more diminished status before disbanding into state and regional aggregations.

== Members ==
Contrary to the organization name, NABBP members were clubs, not individual players. Generally the clubs joined the association and retained membership by sending delegates to the annual convention, usually in the December preceding each season (the ancestor of modern Major League Baseball's so-called Winter Meetings). Membership mediated by state associations was introduced only after ten years; then dozens of clubs from a distant state could join and remain in the NABBP by organizing a state association whose delegates would participate in the national meeting. The first NABBP president was William H. Van Cott of the New York Gothams.

In the year following the 1857 convention, the number of clubs in the association increased from 16 to 25, and had reached 50 by spring 1859. Below are listed the 16 original members, followed by the only three who survived to become charter members of the new National League of Professional Base Ball Clubs (later known simply as the "National League") in 1876.

- Brooklyn: **Atlantic** (to 1870, professional), **Bedford** (1857), **Continental** (to 1863), **Eckford** (to 1870, professional), **Excelsior** (to 1870, amateur), **Harmony** (1857), **Nassau** (to 1859), **Olympic** (1857 and 1859), **Putnam** (to 1862)
- Morrisania (now in The Bronx, New York): Union (to 1870, professional) – that is, **Union of Morrisania**
- New York: **Baltic** (to 1863 and later?), **Eagle** (to 1869?), **Empire** (to 1869), **Gotham** (to 1870, amateur), **Harlem** (to 1869?), **Knickerbocker** (to 1868?)—who would go down in history known as the **New York Knickerbockers**
- **Mutual (New York)** (1858–1870, professional)
- **Athletic (Philadelphia)** (1861–1870, professional)
- **Chicago White Stockings** (1870, professional)

The five named in bold continued as sometime members of the 1871–1875 National Association, (the second of two successive "National Associations") considered the first professional league. Dates refer to NABBP membership, not baseball activity or legal organization, but not all clubs retained membership annually; in particular, the Civil War curtailed membership for 1862 to 1865.

Newark, New Jersey is one of the cities to the west across the Hudson River from New York City. Eight Newark clubs were sometime members and two more clubs from Newark, the Empire in 1858 and the Eckford in 1870, played matches with member clubs.

- Newark members, all years, ordered by first membership: Newark Base Ball Club (1860–1869) – that is, "Newark of Newark" or "Newark Newarks", Newark Eurekas (1860–1869), Newark Adriatics (1861–1862), Newark Americus (1865–1869), Newark Pioneer (1865–1867), Newark Active (1867–?), Newark Excelsior (1869), Newark Amateur (1870)

The members farthest from New York in the early years were the Liberty club of New Brunswick, New Jersey, in 1858, the only one of 25 members outside modern New York City; Niagara of Buffalo, New York, in 1859, when the next furthest of 50 members was the United club based in Trenton, New Jersey; and the Detroit club of Detroit, Michigan, in 1860, when five of 59 members were from outside adjacent New Jersey and New York states, the other four being further south in Washington, D.C., Baltimore, and to the northeast in New Haven, and Boston. Six Philadelphia clubs joined for 1861 but the coming war curtailed the season; some of the 55 members never played a game of any kind. Then the war curtailed membership for 1862 until 1866 when some pre-war members rejoined.

For 1865 there were only 30 members with not one in New England and western outliers merely in Washington, Altoona in southwestern Pennsylvania, and Utica in central New York state. But the December 1865 meeting attracted triple the membership with scattered clubs from Chattanooga, Tennessee, to Fort Leavenworth, Kansas. During the next three seasons, the National Association "filled" with clubs further west from St Louis and Iowa to the northeast in Boston and Maine. By 1867 there were too many delegates to handle in convention, so membership via state associations was introduced for 1868 and, perhaps for that reason, there is no reliable enumeration of the members from 1868 to 1870.

== Champions ==
The 1857 Atlantic Club of Brooklyn and the 1858 Mutual Club of New York appear to have been recognized as the best clubs of these respective seasons, but scheduling was insufficient overall between New York City and Brooklyn clubs to establish a definitive champion. In 1859, though, Atlantic did emerge as decisive champions of baseball with an overall record of 11 wins and 1 loss and series victories over both Eckford of Brooklyn and Mutual. Thereafter, a formalized challenge system developed whereby the championship, symbolized by a "pennant", would change hands upon the defeat of the existing champion in a two out of three series. Such "series" could actually occur over several weeks or months, with games against other clubs played in between, so the format does not closely resemble the modern World Series in determining baseball's champion. But a series was limited to a season; one win in one or two games did not carry over to next spring.

Without a regular schedule of games, neither the number of wins nor winning percentage necessarily indicates team strength, much less identifies the best team or a credible champion. A challenge format makes sense for that purpose, and it fits the convention whereby contestants meet on the field with money or a trophy at stake. A trophy base ball, provided by the home club and used in the game, was commonly at stake; the pennant provided by the Association was a second trophy at stake in some games. Unfortunately, the strongest team in a given year did not always have an opportunity to play for the championship, as the strongest boxer or chess player may annually have an opportunity in the challenge formats that developed in those sports.

Indeed, in several NABBP seasons it appears that the strongest team never played a series for the championship, including at least Athletic of Philadelphia in 1868 and the Cincinnati Red Stockings in 1869. The latter were undefeated, with victories over all of the leading clubs (including ultimate 1868 and 1869 champions Mutual and Atlantic), but they never faced a reigning champion in a deciding game, partly because in scheduling tours of continental scope they practically opted out.

Decisive games were also marred by disputes. In 1860, reigning champion Atlantic of Brooklyn and challenger Excelsior of Brooklyn split their first two games. In the third, Excelsior was leading, 8–6, and had men on base, but chose to withdraw because of rowdy behavior by Atlantic partisans and gamblers. The game was declared a draw, and the championship retained by Atlantic.

In 1870, Mutual of New York was leading, 13–12, in the deciding game of its series with the Chicago White Stockings when Mutual left the field in protest. Officials decided to revert the score to the end of the last completed inning and awarded the game, and thus the championship, to Chicago. The Mutual club declared itself champion.

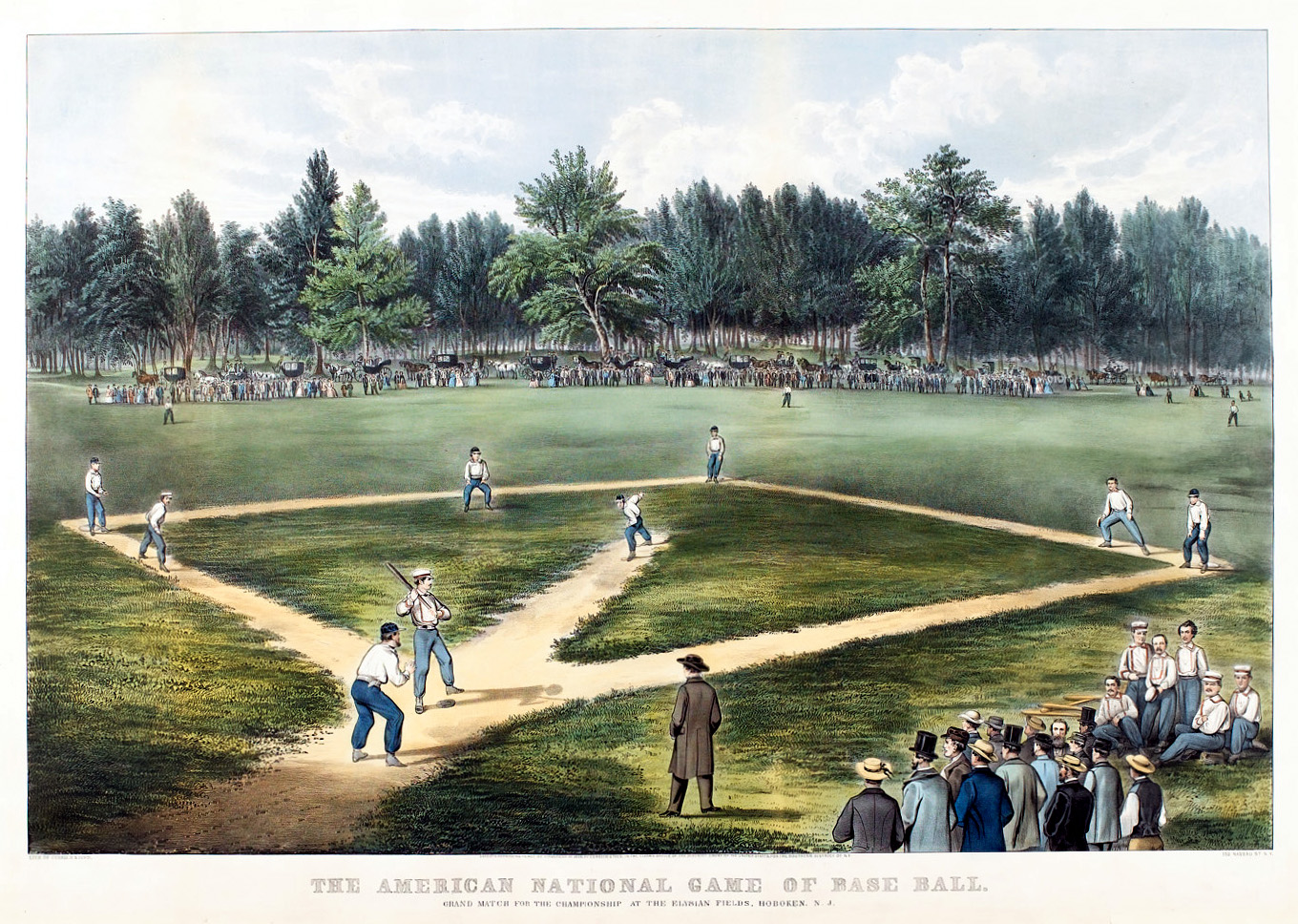
First game of the 1865 base ball championship series between Atlantic and Mutual clubs, played at the famed Elysian Fields in Hoboken, New Jersey, just across the Hudson from the crowded streets of New York City (Currier & Ives lithograph)

End of Year Champions

- 1859 Atlantic of Brooklyn
- 1860 Atlantic of Brooklyn
- 1861 Atlantic of Brooklyn
- 1862 Eckford of Brooklyn
- 1863 Eckford of Brooklyn
- 1864 Atlantic of Brooklyn
- 1865 Atlantic of Brooklyn
- 1866 Atlantic of Brooklyn
- 1867 Union of Morrisania
- 1868 Mutual of New York
- 1869 Atlantic of Brooklyn
- 1870 Chicago White Stockings

== Teams with most wins ==
The won–lost–tied records compiled by Marshall Wright (2000) are not consistently limited to matches between NABBP members.

- 1857 Atlantic (Brooklyn, New York) 7–1–1
- 1858 Mutual (New York) 11–1
- 1859 Excelsior (Brooklyn, New York) 12–3
- 1860 Excelsior (Brooklyn, New York) 18–2–1
- 1861 Mutual (New York) 8–2
- 1862 Eckford (Brooklyn, New York) 14–2
- 1863 Eckford (Brooklyn, New York) 10–0
- 1864 Atlantic (Brooklyn, New York) 20–0–1
- 1865 Atlantic (Brooklyn, New York) 18–0
- 1866 Union (Morrisania, New York) 25–3
- 1867 Athletic (Philadelphia, Pennsylvania) 44–3
- 1868 Athletic (Philadelphia, Pennsylvania) 47–3
- 1869 Cincinnati (Cincinnati, Ohio) 57–0
- 1870 Mutual (New York) 68–17–3

== Legacy ==
The Chicago Cubs, who played their first season in the NABBP in 1870 as the Chicago White Stockings, is the only surviving team from the old NABBP.

The current Cincinnati Reds claim the Cincinnati Red Stockings lineage as baseball's first fully professional team; however, the modern Reds did not start play (in the old American Association) until 1882, twelve years after the old Red Stockings folded. Much of the Cincinnati team, including their ownership, started a new team in Boston in 1871 that became the old Boston Braves. The Braves joined the National League in 1876, became the Milwaukee Braves in 1953, and finally the Atlanta Braves in 1966; in this way, the Braves also claim to be descendants of the Red Stockings.

Another team that claims lineage from the NABBP is the Buffalo Bisons, currently a minor league ("Triple A") baseball squad that counts the Niagara club as a predecessor. Like the Cincinnati situation, however, the Bisons have not operated continuously: the original Bisons moved to Winnipeg midway through the 1970 season, and the Queen City had no baseball until the Jersey City A's moved to town in 1979 and assumed the Bisons identity.
