= Horatio Munn =

American baseball player (1851–1910)

- Second baseman
- Born: July 26, 1851; Newark, New Jersey
- Died: February 17, 1910 (aged 58); Brooklyn, New York
- Batted: Unknown Threw: Unknown

MLB debut
- September 4, 1875, for the Brooklyn Atlantics

Last MLB appearance
- September 6, 1875, for the Brooklyn Atlantics

MLB statistics
- At bats: 4
- RBI: 0
- Home runs: 0
- Batting average: .000
- Stats at Baseball Reference

Teams
- Brooklyn Atlantics (1875)

Horatio Brinsmade Munn (1851-1910) was an American professional baseball player who played second base for the 1875 Brooklyn Atlantics.
