= Oliver Brown (baseball) =

American baseball player (1849–1932)

- Outfielder
- Born: 1849; Brooklyn, New York
- Died: September 23, 1932 (aged 82–83); Brooklyn, New York
- Batted: Unknown Threw: Unknown

MLB debut
- August 1, 1872, for the Brooklyn Atlantics

Last MLB appearance
- August 26, 1875, for the Brooklyn Atlantics

MLB statistics
- Batting average: .080
- Runs scored: 0
- RBIs: 0
- Stats at Baseball Reference

Teams
- National Association of Base Ball Players Brooklyn Atlantics (1869) National Association of Professional BBP Brooklyn Atlantics (1872, 1875)

Oliver S. Brown (1849–1932) was a professional baseball player who played outfield for the 1872 and 1875 Brooklyn Atlantics team of the NAPBBP.
