= Harry Arundel =

American baseball player (1855–1904)

- Pitcher
- Born: February 8, 1855; Philadelphia, Pennsylvania, US
- Died: March 25, 1904 (aged 49); Cleveland, Ohio, US
- Batted: Unknown Threw: Right

Major-league debut
- July 19, 1875, for the Brooklyn Atlantics

Last major-league appearance
- October 10, 1884, for the Providence Grays

Major-league statistics
- Win–loss record: 5-11
- Earned run average: 4.50
- Strikeouts: 52
- Stats at Baseball Reference

Teams
- Brooklyn Atlantics (1875); Pittsburgh Alleghenys (1882); Providence Grays (1884)

Harry Arundel (February 8, 1855 – March 25, 1904) was an American professional baseball player who pitched for three major-league seasons. He played for the 1875 Brooklyn Atlantics, the 1882 Pittsburgh Alleghenys, and the 1884 Providence Grays. He also played minor league baseball with the Akrons of Ohio in 1881. Arundel was born in Philadelphia in February 1855, and died at the age of 49 of Bright's disease. He is interred at Woodland Cemetery in Cleveland, Ohio.
