= Washington Fulmer =

American baseball player (1840–1907)

- Outfielder
- Born: June 15, 1840; Philadelphia, Pennsylvania
- Died: December 8, 1907 (aged 67); Philadelphia, Pennsylvania
- Batted: Unknown Threw: Unknown

MLB debut
- July 19, 1875, for the Brooklyn Atlantics

Last MLB appearance
- July 19, 1875, for the Brooklyn Atlantics

MLB statistics
- At bats: 4
- RBI: 1
- Home Runs: 0
- Batting average: .500
- Stats at Baseball Reference

Teams
- Brooklyn Atlantics (1875)

Washington Fayette Fulmer (June 15, 1840 – December 8, 1907) was an American professional baseball player who played one game, in center field for the 1875 Brooklyn Atlantics of the National Association. He is an older brother to Chick Fulmer, who also played professional baseball. He was an American Civil War veteran who served two different regiments, and was later involved in two veteran organizations.

== Early life ==
Fulmer was born on June 15, 1840, in Philadelphia, Pennsylvania to Michael Fulmer and Sarah (née Pedrick). During the American Civil War, he served with the Union Army as a member of 71st Pennsylvania Infantry (also known as Baker's Regiment) and the 16th Infantry Regiment. After his service, he was member of the Veteran Reserve Corps and the Grand Army of the Republic (GAR), Post 71.

== Career ==
At the age of 35, Fulmer's professional baseball career consisted of one game for the Brooklyn Atlantics of the National Association. On July 19, 1875, he played center field in 23–3 loss to the Philadelphia Athletics. In four at bats, he collected two hits, scored one run and had one run batted in. His younger brother, Chick Fulmer, played 11 seasons of professional baseball from 1871 until 1884.

== Post-career ==
He was working as Firefighter with the Philadelphia Water Department when he died on December 8, 1907, of acute gastric indigestion. He is interred at Fernwood Cemetery in Fernwood, Delaware County, Pennsylvania. His widow, Amelia, filed for a Civil War pension shortly after his death in 1907, citing both of his former regiments.
