= Bill Gilbert (baseball) =

American baseball player (1868–1927)

- Pitcher
- Born: March 13, 1868; Havre De Grace, Maryland, U.S.
- Died: December 17, 1927 (aged 59); Havre De Grace, Maryland, U.S.
- Batted: Unknown Threw: Unknown

MLB debut
- September 15, 1892, for the Baltimore Orioles

Last MLB appearance
- September 20, 1892, for the Baltimore Orioles

MLB statistics
- Win–loss record: 0–1
- Strikeouts: 5
- Earned run average: 5.79
- Stats at Baseball Reference

Teams
- Baltimore Orioles (1892)

Alfred Gideon "Bill" Gilbert (March 13, 1868 – December 17, 1927) was an American professional baseball player who played two games for the Baltimore Orioles during the 1892 season.

He was born in Havre De Grace, Maryland and died there at the age of 59.
