= George Davies (baseball) =

American baseball player (1868–1906)

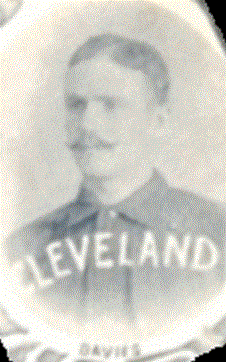
- Pitcher
- Born: February 22, 1868; Portage, Wisconsin, U.S.
- Died: September 22, 1906 (aged 38); Waterloo, Wisconsin, U.S.
- Batted: Unknown Threw: Right

MLB debut
- August 18, 1891, for the Milwaukee Brewers

Last MLB appearance
- July 20, 1893, for the New York Giants

MLB statistics
- Win–loss record: 18-24
- Earned run average: 3.32
- Strikeouts: 166
- Stats at Baseball Reference

Teams
- Milwaukee Brewers (1891); Cleveland Spiders (1892–1893); New York Giants (1893)

George Washington Davies (February 22, 1868 – September 22, 1906) was an American professional baseball player who played pitcher in the Major Leagues in 1891-1893. He was born in Portage, Wisconsin, and played for the Cleveland Spiders, New York Giants, and Milwaukee Brewers. He died in Waterloo, Wisconsin, aged 38.
