= Bill Boyd (baseball) =

American baseball player (1852–1912)

- Third baseman/Right fielder
- Born: December 22, 1852; New York City, New York, U.S.
- Died: October 1, 1912 (aged 59); Jamaica, New York, U.S.
- Batted: Unknown Threw: Unknown

MLB debut
- April 22, 1872, for the New York Mutuals

Last MLB appearance
- October 9, 1875, for the Brooklyn Atlantics

MLB statistics
- Batting average: .288
- Home runs: 3
- Runs batted in: 91
- Stats at Baseball Reference

Teams
- As player: New York Mutuals (1872); Brooklyn Atlantics (1873), (1875); Hartford Dark Blues (1874); As manager: Brooklyn Atlantics (1875)

William J. Boyd (December 22, 1852 – October 1, 1912) was an American Major League Baseball player born in New York, New York. He mainly played third base and right field for three teams during his four-year career in the National Association from 1872 through 1875. He batted .288, hit three home runs, and drove in 91 runs in those four years. While with the 1875 Brooklyn Atlantics, he managed for a period of two games, losing both. When he was not playing in that final season, he filled in for the umpire on 20 occasions.

Boyd died at the age of 59 in Jamaica, New York, and was buried at the Saint John's Cemetery in Middle Village, New York.
