= William Rexter =

American baseball player (1850–1898)

- Outfielder
- Born: c. 1850; Brooklyn, New York
- Died: June 23, 1898 (aged 47–48); Staten Island, New York
- Batted: Unknown Threw: Unknown

MLB debut
- September 25, 1875, for the Brooklyn Atlantics

Last MLB appearance
- September 25, 1875, for the Brooklyn Atlantics

MLB statistics
- At bats: 4
- Batting average: .000
- RBI: 0
- Stats at Baseball Reference

Teams
- Brooklyn Atlantics (1875)

William H. Rexter (c. 1850 – June 23, 1898) was an American professional baseball player who played outfield for the 1875 Brooklyn Atlantics.
