= Walt Preston =

American baseball player (1868–1937)

- Outfielder/Third baseman
- Born: April 6, 1868; Richmond, Virginia, U.S.
- Died: December 23, 1937 (aged 69); New Orleans, Louisiana, U.S.
- Batted: Left Threw: Right

MLB debut
- April 18, 1895, for the Louisville Colonels

Last MLB appearance
- July 8, 1895, for the Louisville Colonels

MLB statistics
- Batting average: .279
- Stolen bases: 11
- Runs batted in: 24
- Stats at Baseball Reference

Teams
- Louisville Colonels (1895)

Walter B. Preston (April 6, 1868 – December 23, 1937) was an American professional baseball player. He played outfield and third base in the National League for the Louisville Colonels during the 1895 season. He played in the minors through 1907.
