= George Hodson (baseball) =

American baseball player (1868–1924)

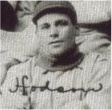
- Pitcher
- Born: June 1868; Pennsylvania, U.S.
- Died: January 9, 1924 (aged 55); San Rafael, California, U.S.
- Batted: Right Threw: Right

MLB debut
- August 9, 1894, for the Boston Beaneaters

Last MLB appearance
- May 22, 1895, for the Philadelphia Phillies

MLB statistics
- Win–loss record: 5-6
- Earned run average: 6.53
- Strikeouts: 18
- Stats at Baseball Reference

Teams
- Boston Beaneaters (1894); Philadelphia Phillies (1895)

George S. Hodson (June 1868 – January 9, 1924) was an American pitcher in Major League Baseball. He played for the Boston Beaneaters in 1894 and the Philadelphia Phillies in 1895. He also pitched in the minor leagues for 17 seasons and won 20 or more games six times. Hodson was 5 feet, 7 inches tall and weighed 150 pounds.

== Career ==
Hodson was born in Pennsylvania in 1868. He started his professional baseball career in 1888 with the International Association's Buffalo Bisons. Over the next several seasons, he bounced around the minor leagues. He had a win–loss record of 11-9 while playing in the Eastern Interstate League in 1890. In 1892, he had a big season for the Altoona Mountaineers of the Pennsylvania State League, going 21-12 with a 1.33 earned run average; he led the league in wins, complete games (32), innings pitched (319), walks (98), and strikeouts (223).

Hodson stayed in the Pennsylvania State League for a few years until he was purchased by the National League's Boston Beaneaters in August 1894. He made 11 late-season starts for Boston, going 4-4 with a 5.84 ERA. Early in the following season, he went 1-2 with a 9.53 ERA for the Philadelphia Phillies; that was his last major league experience. He finished the season pitching for the Eastern League's Providence Grays and would stay with the club until 1898. In 1895, he won 20 games for them, and in 1897, he won 21. Playing for the Connecticut State League's New Haven Blues in 1900, Hodson had another good campaign and led the league in wins (22), complete games (32), and innings pitched (315).

After 1900, Hodson moved west and pitched two seasons for Oakland of the California League. He won 13 games in 1901 and then won 23 games in 1902 to help Oakland capture the league championship. In 1903, he played for the San Francisco Seals of the new Pacific Coast League. He won the franchise's first-ever game on March 26. Hodson pitched 399.2 innings that year in 50 appearances, and he went 20-24 with a 3.42 ERA. He then spent one season in the Western League before retiring from baseball.

Hodson died in San Rafael, California, in 1924.
