= Martin Mullen =

American baseball player (1852–1915)

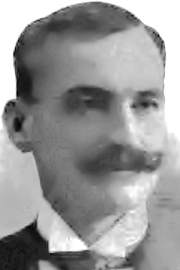
- Outfielder
- Born: August 22, 1852; Cleveland, Ohio
- Died: October 27, 1915 (aged 63); Cleveland, Ohio
- Batted: Unknown Threw: Unknown

MLB debut
- August 17, 1872, for the Cleveland Forest Citys

Last MLB appearance
- August 17, 1872, for the Cleveland Forest Citys

MLB statistics
- Batting average: .000
- Home runs: 0
- RBIs: 0
- Stats at Baseball Reference

Teams
- Cleveland Forest Citys (1872)

Martin Mullen (August 22, 1852 – October 27, 1915) was an American professional baseball player for the Cleveland Forest Citys. He played in one game on August 17, 1872 and was hitless in four at-bats, scoring one run. He played in right field for the game. His one appearance in the professional leagues was due to an accident. Rynie Wolters, the regular outfielder for the Forest Citys, swallowed his chaw of tobacco and could not play so Mullen, a local amateur player made his professional debut.
