= John Stedronsky =

Austrian-American baseball player (1850–1924)

- Third baseman
- Born: Jan Štědronský; June 22, 1849; Štědronín, Bohemia, Austrian Empire
- Died: May 11, 1924 (aged 74); Cleveland, Ohio, U.S.
- Batted: Unknown Threw: Unknown

MLB debut
- September 25, 1879, for the Chicago White Stockings

Last MLB appearance
- 1879, for the Chicago White Stockings

MLB statistics
- Batting average: .083
- Hits: 1
- Runs: 0
- Stats at Baseball Reference

Teams
- Chicago White Stockings (1879)

John Stedronsky (June 22, 1849 – May 11, 1924) was an American third baseman in Major League Baseball for the 1879 Chicago White Stockings. A Czech, he was the first person born in the Austrian Empire in the history of Major League Baseball.

Jan Štědronský was born in Štědronín, Bohemia, Austrian Empire on June 22, 1849, and his family emigrated to the United States in 1853. He married and had five children. Stedronsky suffered a stroke and died on May 11, 1924. He was buried at Woodland Cemetery in Cleveland, Ohio.
