= Tom Cahill (baseball) =

American baseball player (1868–1894)

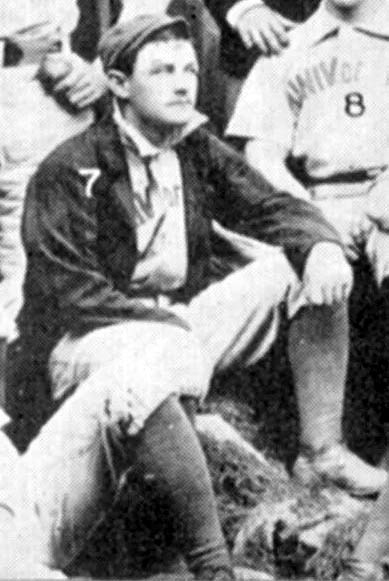
- Utility player
- Born: October , 1868; Fall River, Massachusetts, U.S.
- Died: December 25, 1894 (aged 26); Scranton, Pennsylvania, U.S.
- Batted: Unknown Threw: Unknown

MLB debut
- April 9, 1891, for the Louisville Colonels

Last MLB appearance
- October 4, 1891, for the Louisville Colonels

MLB statistics
- Batting average: .253
- Home runs: 3
- RBIs: 44
- Stolen bases: 38
- Stats at Baseball Reference

Teams
- Louisville Colonels (1891)

Thomas H. Cahill (October 1868 – December 25, 1894) was an American professional baseball player who played from 1888 to 1894. He played one season in Major League Baseball and had a career batting average of .253 with 109 hits, 17 doubles, 7 triples, 3 home runs, 44 RBIs, and 38 stolen bases. He was of Irish descent.

== Early life ==
Cahill was born in Fall River, Massachusetts, in October, 1868. His father, also named Thomas Cahill, was born in Ireland and worked as a laborer. Cahill's mother was also born in Ireland. Cahill attended both the College of the Holy Cross, and the University of Pennsylvania. At the University of Pennsylvania, Cahill studied medicine while playing professional baseball. He left the University of Pennsylvania School of Medicine in 1891 to play professional baseball full-time, but planned on returning to his studies and eventually becoming a doctor.

== Professional career ==
=== Early career ===
In 1888, Cahill began his professional career at the age of 19 with the Worcester Grays of the New England League. The next season, Cahill played with the New Haven, Connecticut, baseball club of the Atlantic Association. Cahill was described by the Meriden Daily Republican as "a popular catcher," and the New Haven club resigned Cahill for the 1890 season.

=== Louisville Colonels ===
Cahill began to play with the Major League Baseball franchise Louisville Colonels of the American Association in 1891, a year after they won the American Association pennant. On the season, Cahill played multiple positions including catcher (55 games), shortstop (49 games), outfield (12 games), second base (6 games), and third base (2 games). In total, Cahill committed 69 errors in 342 total chances, giving him a fielding percentage of .930. On the offensive side, Cahill batted .253 with 68 runs, 17 doubles, 7 triples, 3 home runs, 44 RBIs, 38 stolen bases, and 41 bases on balls. Among teammates, Cahill lead the Colonels in stolen bases, and stolen bases; was second in doubles; and was fourth in hits, bases on balls, and triples (tied with Ollie Beard). Cahill was first in the majors in stolen bases amongst fellow rookies (tied with Tommy Dowd), and was second in the league (first in the American Association) in doubles. On April 21, 1892, Cahill was released by the Colonels.

=== Later career ===
After his major league career, Cahill played for the Troy Trojans of the Eastern League for two seasons (1892–1893). His final season was 1894, before his death. Cahill played with the Troy Washerwomen, which later moved to Scranton, Pennsylvania, and became the Scranton Indians. He was the manager of the Scranton baseball club.

== Death ==
Cahill died on December 25, 1894, in Scranton, Pennsylvania. He originally was believed to be suffering from complications after an injury, but it was later determined that he was fatally afflicted with tuberculosis. Cahill was buried in St. John Cemetery in Fall River, Massachusetts.
