= Ambrose McGann =

American baseball player (1868–1941)

- Infielder / Outfielder
- Born: May 1868; Baltimore, Maryland, U.S.
- Died: February 2, 1941 (aged 72); Baltimore, Maryland, U.S.
- Batted: Unknown Threw: Unknown

MLB debut
- May 2, 1895, for the Louisville Colonels

Last MLB appearance
- September 24, 1895, for the Louisville Colonels

MLB statistics
- Batting average: .288
- Stolen bases: 6
- Runs batted in: 9
- Stats at Baseball Reference

Teams
- Louisville Colonels (1895)

Ambrose James McGann (May 1868 – February 2, 1941) was an American infielder and outfielder in Major League Baseball, playing mainly at shortstop for the Louisville Colonels during the 1895 season.

McGann was born in Baltimore, Maryland, to Andrew and Catherine McGann, who were both born in Maryland to Irish emigrants.

In one season career, McGann was a .288 hitter (21-for-73) with nine runs and nine RBI in 20 games, including five doubles, two triples, six stolen bases, and a .358 on-base percentage.

McGann died in his homeland of Baltimore, at the age of 72.
