= Biff Sheehan =

American baseball player (1868–1923)

- Outfielder / First baseman
- Born: February 13, 1868; Hartford, Connecticut, U.S.
- Died: October 21, 1923 (aged 55); Hartford, Connecticut, U.S.
- Batted: Left Threw: Right

MLB debut
- July 22, 1895, for the St. Louis Browns

Last MLB appearance
- May 10, 1896, for the St. Louis Browns

MLB statistics
- Batting average: .302
- Home runs: 1
- Runs batted in: 19
- Stats at Baseball Reference

Teams
- St. Louis Browns (1895–1896)

Timothy James Sheehan (February 13, 1868 – October 21, 1923) was an American outfielder and first baseman for the St. Louis Browns of the National League in 1895 and 1896. His minor league career stretched from 1889 through 1899.
