= Charlie Weber (baseball) =

American baseball player (1868–1914)

- Pitcher
- Born: October 22, 1868; Cincinnati, Ohio
- Died: June 13, 1914 (aged 45); Beaumont, Texas
- Batted: Unknown Threw: Unknown

MLB debut
- July 30, 1898, for the Washington Senators

Last MLB appearance
- July 30, 1898, for the Washington Senators

MLB statistics
- Win–loss record: 0–1
- Earned run average: 15.75
- Strikeouts: 0
- Stats at Baseball Reference

Teams
- Washington Senators (1898)

Charles P. Weber (October 22, 1868 – June 13, 1914) nicknamed "Count", was a Major League Baseball pitcher. Weber played for the Washington Senators in 1898.

He was born in Cincinnati, Ohio and died in Beaumont, Texas after being shot to death.
