= Bobby Cargo =

American baseball player (1868–1904)

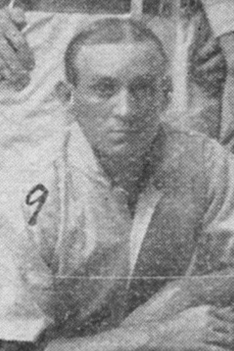
- Cargo with the Nashville Baseball Club in 1902
- Shortstop
- Born: October 1, 1868; Pittsburgh, Pennsylvania, U.S.
- Died: April 27, 1904 (aged 35); Atlanta, Georgia, U.S.
- Batted: Right Threw: Right

MLB debut
- October 6, 1892, for the Pittsburgh Pirates

Last MLB appearance
- October 7, 1892, for the Pittsburgh Pirates

MLB statistics
- Batting average: .250
- Hits: 1
- Runs batted in: 0
- Stats at Baseball Reference

Teams
- Pittsburgh Pirates (1892)

Robert J. Cargo (October 1, 1868 – April 27, 1904) was an American former professional baseball shortstop who played two games for the 1892 Pittsburgh Pirates. He remained active in the minor leagues through 1903. He died of pneumonia in 1904, which he contracted during his playing career.

== Early life ==
Cargo was born on October 1, 1868, in Pittsburgh, Pennsylvania, to Robert and Martha Cargo. At the 1880 United States census, Robert Sr. worked as a "stockdealer", while Martha was unemployed, with her occupation listed as a "kh" [keephouse]. The family lived in the 11th Ward of Pittsburgh.
