= Pat McGee (baseball) =

American baseball player

- Center fielder
- Born: Unknown
- Died: June 20, 1889; New York, New York, U.S.
- Batted: Unknown Threw: Unknown

MLB debut
- September 24, 1874, for the Brooklyn Atlantics

Last MLB appearance
- September 17, 1875, for the Brooklyn Atlantics

MLB statistics
- Games played: 59
- Runs scored: 11
- Hits: 38
- Batting average: .169
- Stats at Baseball Reference

Teams
- Brooklyn Atlantics (1874); New York Mutuals (1875); Brooklyn Atlantics (1875)

Patrick McGee (died June 20, 1889) was an American professional baseball player who played as a center fielder from 1874 to 1875 for the Brooklyn Atlantics and New York Mutuals.
