= Al Strueve =

American baseball player (1860–1929)

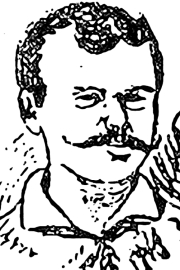
- Catcher/Outfielder
- Born: June 26, 1860; Cincinnati
- Died: January 28, 1929 (aged 68); Ross County, Ohio
- Batted: Unknown Threw: Unknown

MLB debut
- June 22, 1884, for the St. Louis Browns

Last MLB appearance
- June 24, 1884, for the St. Louis Browns

MLB statistics
- Batting average: .286
- Home runs: 0
- Runs scored: 0
- Stats at Baseball Reference

Teams
- St. Louis Browns (1884)

Albert Frederick Strueve (June 26, 1860 – January 28, 1929) was a 19th-century professional baseball player.
