= Fred Underwood =

American baseball player (1868–1906)

- Pitcher
- Born: October 14, 1868; St. Louis County, Missouri, U.S.
- Died: January 26, 1906 (aged 37); Kansas City, Missouri, U.S.
- Batted: Unknown Threw: Unknown

MLB debut
- July 18, 1894, for the Brooklyn Grooms

Last MLB appearance
- August 30, 1894, for the Brooklyn Grooms

MLB statistics
- Win–loss record: 2–4
- Earned run average: 7.85
- Strikeouts: 10
- Stats at Baseball Reference

Teams
- Brooklyn Grooms (1894)

Frederick Theodore Underwood (October 14, 1868 – January 26, 1906) was an American Major League Baseball pitcher during part of the 1894 season. He was a native of St. Louis County, Missouri.

Underwood appeared in seven games for the Brooklyn Grooms of the National League, starting six of them and completing five. He gave up 110 baserunners (80 hits and 30 walks) in just 47 innings. He also gave up 62 runs, but only 41 of them were earned runs.

Despite his struggles he did win two games for Brooklyn...July 21 against the Philadelphia Phillies (8-7) and July 28 against the Washington Senators (9-5). He was more successful with the bat, as he went 7-for-18 for a batting average of .389.

In his short MLB career he was 2–4 with 10 strikeouts and an earned run average of 7.85.

Underwood died at the age of 37 in Kansas City, Missouri.
