= Eckford of Brooklyn =

Information
- League: National Association
- Location: Brooklyn, New York
- Ballpark: Red House Grounds, Harlem (1856); Manor House Grounds, Greenpoint (1857–1861); Union Grounds (1862–1872)
- Founded: 1855
- Folded: 1872
- League championships: 1862, 1863
- Former league: National Amateur Association
- Manager: Jimmy Wood (1872); Jim Clinton (1872)

Eckford of Brooklyn, or simply Eckford, was an American baseball club from 1855 to 1872. When the Union Grounds opened on May 15, 1862 for baseball in Williamsburg, Brooklyn, it became the first enclosed baseball grounds in America. Three clubs called the field on the corner of Marcy Avenue and Rutledge Street home; however, the Eckford of Brooklyn were the most famous tenant. They played more games than any other club that year (7) and won the "national" championship, repeating the feat in 1863. During that two year period, the Eckfords won 22 straight matches which was the longest undefeated and untied streak to date. In the late 1860s, they were one of the pioneering professional clubs, although probably second to Mutual of New York at the home park. In its final season, Eckford entered the second championship of the National Association, the first professional baseball league in America, so it is considered a major league club by those who count the NA as a major league.

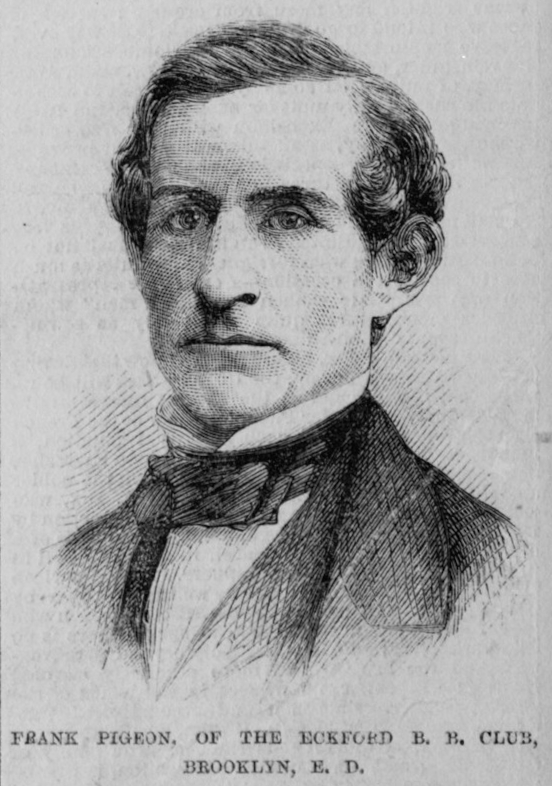
Captain Frank Pigeon, star pitcher of the Eckfords during the 1850s

Formally organized on June 27, 1855, the Eckford Base Ball Club was named for shipbuilder Henry Eckford whose base of operations from the late 1790s until the early 1830s was Brooklyn, New York. He designed many American warships that participated in the War of 1812. The team's first president was Frank Pidgeon, who was one of Eckford's founding members.

From the sports page of Chicago's Daily Inter Ocean newspaper, December 20, 1879, p. 3: "Peter Tostevin, whose name was identified with the early history of the once famous Eckford Club of Brooklyn, N.Y., died in that city Dec. 8, aged 52. He assisted in organizing that club, and played first base during the seasons of 1856–57, and third base during 1858, filling the office of President in the latter year." Immigration and census records show that Peter Tostevin, a resident of Brooklyn, was born in France in about 1827, that he immigrated to the United States on May 31, 1852, and that he was a mason and master builder.

Eckford was one of 16 participants in the 1857 convention, all from modern New York City. There the pioneer New York Knickerbockers essentially transferred baseball governance to the leading clubs as a group, so the event is traditionally considered the birthday of the National Association of Base Ball Players and the participants are considered the NABBP charter members.

== Name ==
Today the Eckford club and its teams are commonly called "the Brooklyn Eckfords". The Eckfords, plural with definite article, was used by contemporary writers in prose, perhaps for the grammatical parallel to ordinary nouns used with plural verbs ("the visitors are staying downtown" or "the men are playing well"); perhaps by direct analogy to plurals formed from family names ("the Millers are coming to dinner"). "Brooklyn" in the team name is a later development, matching the later convention that a club or team should be named for a locale or region that it represents.

The Eckfords never represented Brooklyn. First, they did not survive to the era of exclusive territories, sometimes called "sports franchising", which the new National League instituted in 1876. Second, Brooklyn was populous enough to maintain several strong teams and support the construction of two enclosed ballparks during the amateur days when few players migrated to baseball jobs. Third, New York and Brooklyn had the early start, as the hotbeds where multiple clubs developed prior to cooperation. At the first convention, eight of 16 clubs were based in Brooklyn; three years later, it was 20 of 59. For all these reasons, When the NABBP permitted open professionalism in 1869, Eckford and Atlantic among dozens of Brooklyn members were both viable in following that route, and in 1872 they both joined the National Association league for its second season.

Eckford of Brooklyn may be another latterday coinage. Contemporary readers would probably understand it as an abbreviation for something like Eckford Base Ball Club, of Brooklyn in contrast to "Eckford" clubs in other cities. "Eckford" was not common as the root of a ballclub name — in contrast to "Athletic", "Atlantic", and "Mutual" — so there must have been little need to distinguish the Brooklyn rendition. (Wright (2000) mentions "Eckford" clubs in Albany 1864-1867, Syracuse 1870, and Newark 1870, as well as the distinctly named "Henry Eckford" club in New York 1860-1864. Due to internal turmoil, the Henry Eckfords organized on August 23, 1859, headed by Dr. William Bell and consisted of Eckford players who were from New York, today referred to as Manhattan. The other Eckfords were not prominent and did not travel so there must little occasion to qualify the "Eckford" name except locally.)

== League era ==
In winter 1871, Eckford did not participate in founding the National Association of Professional Base Ball Players (NA), nor did it enter a team in that first professional league season. The team did win about half of about thirty games against NA opponents, including some late summer games picked up after the Fort Wayne Kekiongas went out of business.

For 1872 Eckford paid the $10 entry fee and assembled a team but it was a woefully weak one that lost all of its 11 games played to July 9, with average score 5-22. Five of the league's eleven teams would drop out by late August but the Eckfords survived. Fortified by seven players from Troy and Cleveland, including both pitchers and three other regulars, they returned to the field August 9. The strengthened team won three of 18 games with average score 5-9.

The old amateur rivals Atlantic and Eckford won only four and three of their last 18 games in the much stronger six-team league from mid-August. In four matches they each won two and scored 37 runs. They may have been equals on the field once again, but Eckford went out of business while Atlantic improved its team and moved in to share the Union Grounds with the Mutuals for the last three National Association seasons.

== Record ==
Regular season record
Year	Wins	Losses	Ties	Games	Rank in games (in wins)
1856	2	0		2	
1857	2	5		7	4
1858	6	0		6	8 (5th in wins)
1859	10	2		12	2 (tie 2nd)
1860	15	2		17	2 (2nd)
1861	8	4		12	1 (tie 1st)
1862	14	1		15	1 (tie 1st)
1863	10	0		10	5 (tie 1st in wins)
1864	1	4		5	17
1865	8	6		14	7 (7th)
1866	9	8		17	6 (tie 8th)
1867	6	16	1	23	10
1868	23	12		35	6 (6th)
1869	47	8		55	2 (2nd)
1870	13	16	1	30	16

Championship matches with professional teams
Year	Wins	Losses	Ties	Games	Rank in games
1869	15	8		23	2 (tie 2nd in wins)
1870	2	12	1	15	11

Professional leagues
Year	Wins	Losses	Ties	Games	Rank in games
1872	3	26		29	6 (did not finish)

Source for season records: Wright (2000) has published records for dozens of NABBP teams each season, relying on a mix of game and season records in contemporary newspapers and guides. Dozens of leading clubs by number of matches are included, as are many others. The records do not consistently cover either all games played or all championship matches between NABBP members.

== Ballparks ==
- Lowry, Phil. Green Cathedrals.
- Benson, Michael. Baseball Parks of North America.

== See also ==
- 1872 Brooklyn Eckfords season
