= Brooklyn Atlantics =

Defunct American baseball team

Atlantic Base Ball Club of Brooklyn
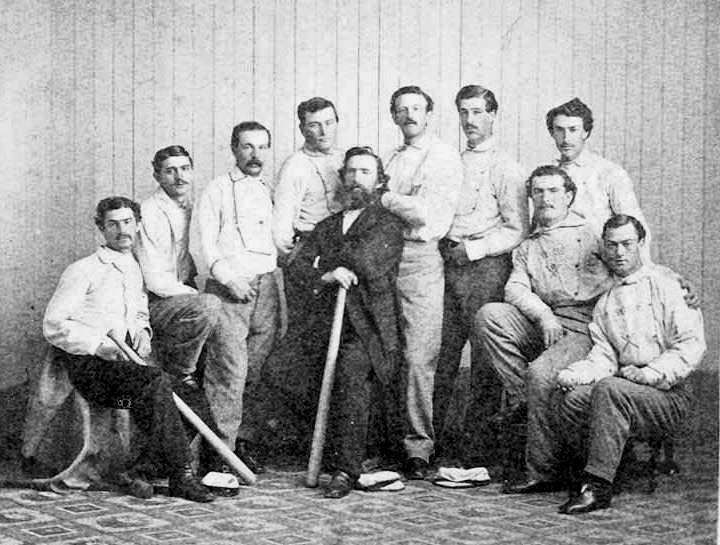
- Logo

Information
- League: National Association (1872–75); National Amateur Association (1857–71)
- Location: Brooklyn, New York
- Ballpark: Capitoline Grounds (1864–72); Union Grounds (1873–75)
- Founded: 1855
- Folded: 1875
- League championships: National Amateur Association (8): 1857, 1859, 1860, 1861, 1864, 1865, 1866, 1869
- Manager: List: Bob Ferguson (1872–74); Bill Boyd (1875); Charlie Pabor (1875)

The Atlantic Base Ball Club of Brooklyn ("Atlantic" or the "Brooklyn Atlantics") was baseball's first champion and its first dynasty. The team was also the first baseball club to visit the White House in 1865 at the invitation of President Andrew Johnson.

== Era before league ==
Established on August 14, 1855, Atlantic became a founding member of the National Association of Base Ball Players, the amateur sport's first governing body, in 1857. (There were no professional clubs at the time.) In 1859, with a record of 11 wins and 1 loss, Atlantic emerged as the recognized champions of baseball.

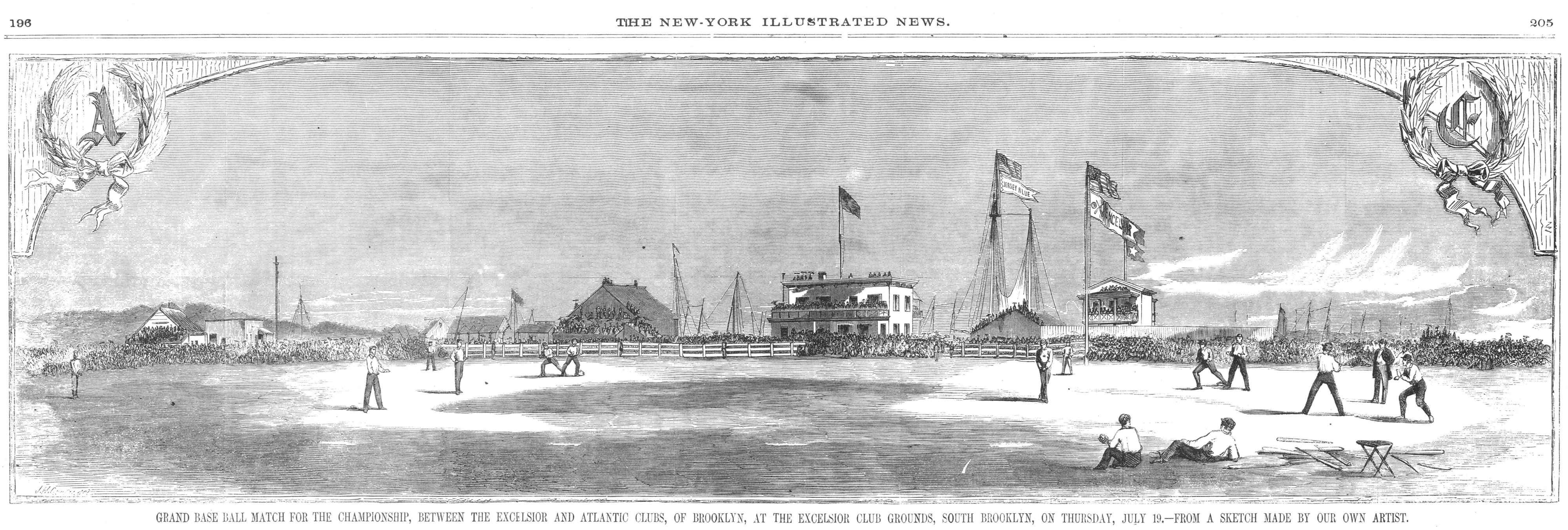
Grand base ball match for the championship, between the Excelsior and Atlantic clubs, of Brooklyn, at the Excelsior Grounds, South Brooklyn, on Thursday, July 19, 1860

Atlantic held the championship through the 1861 season, albeit in controversial fashion. In a third and deciding game with Excelsior of Brooklyn, Excelsior was leading 8–6 and had men on base, but was forced to withdraw by a rowdy crowd of Atlantic partisans and gamblers. The game was declared a draw, and the championship retained by Atlantic.

Atlantic held the championship again through the 1861 season, which was shortened due to the American Civil War, before finally surrendering it to archrival Eckford of Brooklyn in 1862. Atlantic recaptured the pennant in 1866 with a season record of twenty wins, no defeats, and a single tie as the only blemish on its record.

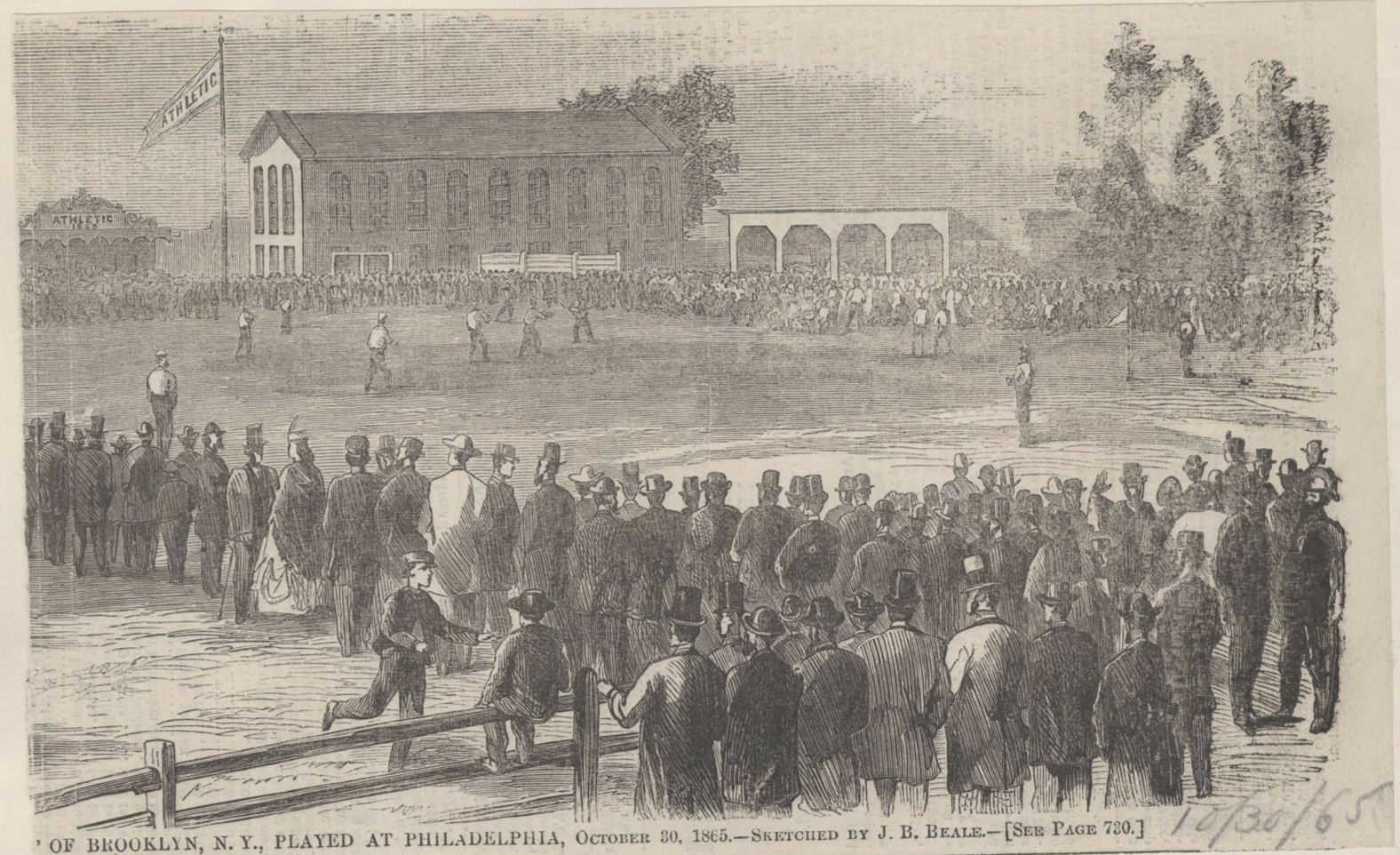
Atlantic defeats Athletic 21-15 on October 30, 1865 in Philadelphia in front of 12,000 spectators.

Atlantic went undefeated in 1865 with an 18–0 record, sweeping series against chief rivals Mutual of New York and Athletic of Philadelphia. Great players of this era included Joe Start, Dickey Pearce, Charlie Smith, Fred Crane, and Tom Pratt. Atlantic's 36-game winning streak was finally broken in June, 1866 by Irvington, NJ. Atlantic retained the pennant that year by splitting a two-game series with Athletic of Philadelphia and declining to schedule a series with Union of Morrisania. Atlantic did surrender the title to Union in 1867.

When Atlantic defeated Eckford to regain the pennant in 1869, Atlantic had already lost to the Cincinnati Red Stockings. This allowed Atlantic to claim the championship over the undefeated Cincinnati club under the "challenge" format of the National Association of Base Ball Players, which resembled modern boxing championship rules rather than a league or tournament format. This outcome undoubtedly contributed to the tremendous anticipation when Cincinnati came to Brooklyn with an 89-game winning streak to meet the Atlantics on June 14, 1870 at Atlantic's home Capitoline Grounds. An estimated crowd of 15,000 paid 50 cents a piece to see Atlantic win 8–7 in extra innings in one of the most significant games in baseball history. Atlantic surrendered the title later in the year, though, to Mutual.

=== White House visit ===
After the 1865 season, the Atlantics became the first baseball team to visit the White House. Arthur Gorman, one of the founders of the Washington Nationals Base Ball Club and an acquaintance of President Andrew Johnson, organized a tournament featuring his team, the Athletic Base Ball Club of Philadelphia and the Atlantics. Philadelphia refused to play in the final game as they would not receive any of the gate revenue and left. Having known President Johnson since his days as a page in the United States Senate, Gorman offered to take the visiting team to the White House to meet the President. Brooklyn accepted and visited on August 30, 1865. A daguerreotype of the Atlantics presenting an official team jersey to the President bearing the number “65” is on display at the National Baseball Hall of Fame in Cooperstown, New York.

== League era ==
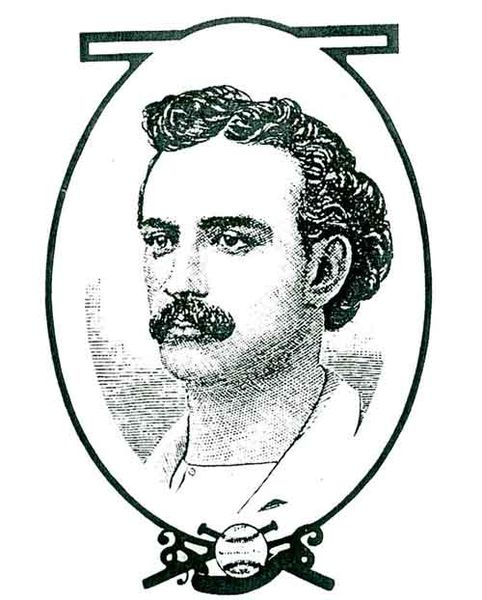
Lip Pike

Atlantic had been among the first clubs to declare themselves professional when allowed to do so in 1869. However, when the major professional clubs formed the National Association of Professional Base Ball Players in 1871, Atlantic declined to field a team. As a result, their best players, including George Zettlein, Bob Ferguson, Joe Start and Lip Pike, jumped to other clubs.

When Atlantic did join the professional circuit in 1872, it was unable to reestablish itself as a leading club, suffering losing records in each of its four seasons in the league. Atlantic was not invited to join the National League when that circuit was formed in 1876, but continued to play an independent schedule until at least 1882.

A remnant Atlantic was invited to join the upstart American Association in 1882 but failed to satisfy the requirements for doing so. For many years afterwards, the term Atlantic batting referred to a big inning, especially late in the game.

== Record ==
Year	W	L	T	Games	Rank in games (in wins)
1857	7	1	1	9	3 (1st in wins)
1858	7	0		7	5 (4th)
1859	11	1		12	3 (tie 2nd)
1860	12	2	1	16	3 (3rd)
Championship matches with professional teams 1869–1870
1869	15	6	1	22	3 (tie 2nd in wins)
1870	20	16		36	3 (5th)
Professional leagues
1871					non-member
1872	9	28		37	5 (did not finish)
1873	17	37	1	55	3 (6th place)
1874	22	33	1	56	5 (6th place)
1875	2	42		44	9

Source for season records: Wright (2000) has published records for dozens of NABBP teams each season, relying on a mix of game and season records in contemporary newspapers and guides. Dozens of leading clubs by number of matches are included, as are many others. The records do not consistently cover either all games played or all championship matches between NABBP members.

== See also ==
- 1872 Brooklyn Atlantics season
- 1873 Brooklyn Atlantics season
- 1874 Brooklyn Atlantics season
- 1875 Brooklyn Atlantics season

== Baseball card ==
The 1865 Atlantics are said to have been on the first ever baseball card. The only known card was archived at the Library of Congress since the 1880s, when the photographer Charles Williamson submitted the photo for copyright. It remained the only copy of this "card" known to exist until 2013, when another card was found in an old photo album at a yard sale. The 148-year-old team photo was sold to an unnamed bidder for $92,000.00 when it went up for auction on February 6, 2013 in Maine.

== Bibliography ==
- Baseball-Reference. "Brooklyn Atlantics Team Index" (1872–1875). Retrieved 2006-09-17.
- Retrosheet. "Brooklyn Atlantics (1872–1875)" Retrieved 2006-09-17.
- Wright, Marshall (2000). The National Association of Base Ball Players, 1857–1870. Jefferson, NC: McFarland & Co. ISBN 0-7864-0779-4
