= 1882 Pittsburgh Alleghenys season =

1882 Pittsburgh Alleghenys
- League: American Association
- Ballpark: Exposition Park
- City: Allegheny, Pennsylvania
- Record: 39–39 (.500)
- League place: 4th
- Owner: Denny McKnight
- Manager: Al Pratt

The 1882 season was the first for the Alleghenys, later known as the Pittsburgh Pirates. They finished at exactly a .500 record, 39 wins and 39 losses, good for fourth place in the new American Association.

The team played its home games in Allegheny City, across the Allegheny River from Pittsburgh. Chartered as the Allegheny Base Ball Club of Pittsburgh, the team appeared as "Allegheny" in the standings and was often referred to in the plural as the Alleghenys. The club was not related to the earlier Alleghenys of the International Association.

== Game log ==
1882 Game Log: 39–39 (Home: 17–20; Away: 22–19)
May: 6–5 (Home: 4–2; Away: 2–3)

#	Date	Opponent	Score	Win	Loss	Save	Attendance	Record
1	May 2	@ Red Stockings	10–9			—	—	1–0
2	May 3	@ Red Stockings	3–7			—	—	1–1
3	May 4	@ Red Stockings	10–19			—	—	1–2
4	May 8	@ Red Stockings	2–0			—	—	2–2
5	May 10	Brown Stockings	9–5			—	—	3–2
6	May 16	@ Red Stockings	4–9			—	—	3–3
7	May 18	Red Stockings	2–3			—	—	3–4
8	May 19	Red Stockings	8–7			—	—	4–4
9	May 20	Red Stockings	5–3			—	—	5–4
10	May 29	Eclipse	7–15			—	—	5–5
11	May 30	Eclipse	10–8			—	—	6–5

June: 5–10 (Home: 2–2; Away: 3–8)

#	Date	Opponent	Score	Win	Loss	Save	Attendance	Record
12	June 1	Brown Stockings	11–4			—	—	7–5
13	June 4	@ Brown Stockings	3–7			—	—	7–6
14	June 6	@ Brown Stockings	15–6			—	—	8–6
15	June 8	@ Brown Stockings	5–6			—	—	8–7
16	June 10	@ Brown Stockings	9–3			—	—	9–7
17	June 12	@ Eclipse	4–8			—	—	9–8
18	June 15	@ Eclipse	0–5			—	—	9–9
19	June 17	@ Eclipse	0–10			—	—	9–10
20	June 20	@ Red Stockings	1–6			—	—	9–11
21	June 22	@ Red Stockings	2–5			—	—	9–12
22	June 23	@ Red Stockings	8–5			—	—	10–12
23	June 24	@ Red Stockings	4–21			—	—	10–13
24	June 27	Athletics	4–6			—	—	10–14
25	June 29	Athletics	11–1			—	—	11–14
26	June 30	Athletics	1–7			—	—	11–15

July: 7–8 (Home: 5–7; Away: 2–1)

#	Date	Opponent	Score	Win	Loss	Save	Attendance	Record
27	July 1	Athletics	6–8			—	—	11–16
28	July 4	@ Brown Stockings	6–5			—	—	12–16
29	July 6	Orioles	8–9			—	—	12–17
30	July 7	Orioles	6–8			—	—	12–18
31	July 10	Orioles	11–0			—	—	13–18
32	July 11	Brown Stockings	6–1			—	—	14–18
33	July 12	Brown Stockings	6–1			—	—	15–18
34	July 13	Brown Stockings	1–3			—	—	15–19
35	July 15	Brown Stockings	10–1			—	—	16–19
36	July 19	Red Stockings	6–12			—	—	16–20
37	July 20	Red Stockings	3–2			—	—	17–20
38	July 21	Red Stockings	0–2			—	—	17–21
39	July 22	Red Stockings	2–3			—	—	17–22
40	July 27	@ Orioles	2–3			—	—	17–23
41	July 31	@ Orioles	5–1			—	—	18–23

August: 11–11 (Home: 3–5; Away: 8–6)

#	Date	Opponent	Score	Win	Loss	Save	Attendance	Record
42	August 1	@ Athletics	3–2			—	—	19–23
43	August 3	@ Athletics	3–2			—	—	20–23
44	August 4	@ Athletics	2–4			—	—	20–24
45	August 5	@ Athletics	6–5			—	—	21–24
46	August 9	Orioles	5–8			—	—	21–25
47	August 10	Orioles	5–10			—	—	21–26
48	August 11	Orioles	0–1			—	—	21–27
49	August 12	Orioles	7–8			—	—	21–28
50	August 14	Orioles	14–1			—	—	22–28
51	August 16	@ Eclipse	1–3			—	—	22–29
52	August 17	@ Eclipse	2–3			—	—	22–30
53	August 18	@ Eclipse	8–4			—	—	23–30
54	August 19	@ Eclipse	6–4			—	—	24–30
55	August 20	@ Eclipse	3–1			—	—	25–30
56	August 22	@ Brown Stockings	6–7			—	—	25–31
57	August 23	@ Brown Stockings	10–3			—	—	26–31
58	August 24	@ Brown Stockings	7–2			—	—	27–31
59	August 26	@ Brown Stockings	1–4			—	—	27–32
60	August 27	@ Brown Stockings	2–3			—	—	27–33
61	August 29	Athletics	2–1			—	—	28–33
62	August 30	Athletics	4–1			—	—	29–33
63	August 31	Athletics	2–4			—	—	29–34

September: 10–5 (Home: 3–4; Away: 7–1)

#	Date	Opponent	Score	Win	Loss	Save	Attendance	Record
64	September 1	Athletics	4–3			—	—	30–34
65	September 5	@ Orioles	3–1			—	—	31–34
66	September 6	@ Orioles	14–7			—	—	32–34
67	September 7	@ Orioles	7–5			—	—	33–34
68	September 8	@ Orioles	8–2			—	—	34–34
69	September 9	@ Orioles	7–7			—	—	34–34
70	September 12	@ Athletics	8–6			—	—	35–34
71	September 14	@ Athletics	13–1			—	—	36–34
72	September 15	@ Athletics	6–10			—	—	36–35
73	September 16	@ Athletics	6–3			—	—	37–35
74	September 18	Eclipse	3–5			—	—	37–36
75	September 19	Eclipse	1–3			—	—	37–37
76	September 21	Eclipse	6–4			—	—	38–37
77	September 22	Eclipse	6–20			—	—	38–38
78	September 23	Eclipse	3–13			—	—	38–39
79	September 23	Eclipse	7–1			—	—	39–39

Legend: = Win = Loss = Tie
Bold = Pittsburgh Alleghenys team member

== Season standings ==
American Association
Team	W	L	Pct.	GB	Home	Road
Cincinnati Red Stockings	55	25	.688	—	31‍–‍11	24‍–‍14
Philadelphia Athletics	41	34	.547	11½	21‍–‍18	20‍–‍16
Louisville Eclipse	42	38	.525	13	26‍–‍13	16‍–‍25
Pittsburgh Alleghenys	39	39	.500	15	17‍–‍20	22‍–‍19
St. Louis Brown Stockings	37	43	.463	18	24‍–‍20	13‍–‍23
Baltimore Orioles	19	54	.260	32½	7‍–‍25	12‍–‍29

=== Record vs. opponents ===
1882 American Association record Sources:
Team	BAL	CIN	LOU	PHA	PIT	STL
Baltimore	—	2–14	3–13	4–7	7–7–1	3–13
Cincinnati	14–2	—	11–5	10–6	10–6	10–6
Louisville	13–3	5–11	—	5–11	10–6	9–7
Philadelphia	7–4	6–10	11–5	—	6–10	11–5
Pittsburgh	7–7–1	6–10	6–10	10–6	—	10–6
St. Louis	13–3	6–10	7–9	5–11	6–10	—

=== Detailed records ===
American Association
Opponent	W	L	WP	RS	RA
Cincinnati Red Stockings	6	10	0.375	70	113
Pittsburgh Alleghenys					
St. Louis Brown Stockings	10	6	0.625	107	61
Baltimore Orioles	7	7	0.500	102	71
Louisville Eclipse	6	10	0.375	67	107
Philadelphia Athletics	10	6	0.625	81	64
Total	39	39	0.500	427	416
Season Total	39	39	0.500	427	416

Month	Games	Won	Lost	Win %	RS	RA
May	11	6	5	0.545	70	85
June	15	5	10	0.333	78	100
July	15	7	8	0.467	78	59
August	22	11	11	0.500	99	81
September	15	10	5	0.667	102	91
Total	78	39	39	0.500	427	416

	Games	Won	Lost	Win %	RS	RA
Home	37	17	20	0.459	202	192
Away	41	22	19	0.537	218	217
Total	78	39	39	0.500	427	416

== Roster ==
1882 Pittsburgh Alleghenys roster
Pitchers: Harry Arundel; Morrie Critchley; Denny Driscoll; Harry Salisbury; Jake Seymour	Catchers: Jim Keenan; Rudy Kemmler; Billy Taylor	Infielders: Joe Battin; Jake Goodman; Chappy Lane; Jack Leary; John Peters; George Strief	Outfielders: Mike Mansell; Russ McKelvy; Bill Morgan; Charlie Morton; Ed Swartwood; Manager: Al Pratt

== Player stats ==
Batters

Note: G = Games played; AB = At bats; H = Hits; Avg. = Batting average; HR = Home runs; RBI = Runs batted in

Regular season
Player	G	AB	H	Avg.	HR	RBI
E. Swartwood	76	325	107	0.329	4	0
J. Goodman	10	41	13	0.317	0	0
J. Leary	60	257	75	0.292	1	0
J. Peters	78	333	96	0.288	0	0
C. Morton	25	103	29	0.282	0	0
B. Taylor	70	299	84	0.281	3	0
M. Mansell	79	347	96	0.277	2	0
B. Morgan	17	66	17	0.258	0	0
R. Kemmler	24	99	25	0.253	0	0
J. Keenan	25	96	21	0.219	1	0
J. Battin	34	133	28	0.211	1	0
G. Strief	79	297	58	0.195	2	0
H. Arundel	14	53	10	0.189	0	0
C. Lane	57	214	38	0.178	3	0
H. Salisbury	39	145	22	0.152	0	0
D. Driscoll	23	80	11	0.138	1	0
M. Critchley	1	5	0	0.000	0	0
R. McKelvy	1	4	0	0.000	0	0
J. Seymour	1	4	0	0.000	0	0
R. Wylie	1	3	0	0.000	0	0

Pitchers

Note: G = Games pitched; IP = Innings pitched; W = Wins; L = Losses; ERA = Earned run average; SO = Strikeouts

Regular season
Player	G	IP	W	L	ERA	SO
M. Critchley	1	9	1	0	0.00	3
D. Driscoll	23	201	13	9	1.21	59
H. Salisbury	38	335	20	18	2.63	135
H. Arundel	14	120	4	10	4.65	47
J. Leary	3	18 2/3	1	0	6.27	5
J. Seymour	1	8	0	1	7.88	2
B. Taylor	1	5	0	1	16.20	1

== Transactions ==
- June 1882 – released Morrie Critchley
- June 1882 – released Jake Goodman
- July 1882 – released Harry Arundel
- July 1882 – released Charlie Morton
