= 1882 Philadelphia Athletics season =

1882 Philadelphia Athletics
- League: American Association
- Ballpark: Oakdale Park
- City: Philadelphia, Pennsylvania
- Record: 41–34 (.547)
- League place: 2nd
- Owners: Bill Sharsig, Lew Simmons, Charlie Mason
- Manager: Juice Latham

The 1882 season was the first season for the brand new Philadelphia Athletics (no relation, except by name, to the previous Philadelphia Athletics team). They finished with a 41–34 record and a third-place position in the brand new American Association league.

== Regular season ==
=== Season standings ===
American Association
| Team | W | L | Pct. | GB | Home | Road |
|---|---|---|---|---|---|---|
| Cincinnati Red Stockings | 55 | 25 | .688 | — | 31‍–‍11 | 24‍–‍14 |
| Philadelphia Athletics | 41 | 34 | .547 | 11½ | 21‍–‍18 | 20‍–‍16 |
| Louisville Eclipse | 42 | 38 | .525 | 13 | 26‍–‍13 | 16‍–‍25 |
| Pittsburgh Alleghenys | 39 | 39 | .500 | 15 | 17‍–‍20 | 22‍–‍19 |
| St. Louis Brown Stockings | 37 | 43 | .463 | 18 | 24‍–‍20 | 13‍–‍23 |
| Baltimore Orioles | 19 | 54 | .260 | 32½ | 7‍–‍25 | 12‍–‍29 |

=== Record vs. opponents ===
1882 American Association record Sources:
| Team | BAL | CIN | LOU | PHA | PIT | STL |
|---|---|---|---|---|---|---|
| Baltimore | — | 2–14 | 3–13 | 4–7 | 7–7–1 | 3–13 |
| Cincinnati | 14–2 | — | 11–5 | 10–6 | 10–6 | 10–6 |
| Louisville | 13–3 | 5–11 | — | 5–11 | 10–6 | 9–7 |
| Philadelphia | 7–4 | 6–10 | 11–5 | — | 6–10 | 11–5 |
| Pittsburgh | 7–7–1 | 6–10 | 6–10 | 10–6 | — | 10–6 |
| St. Louis | 13–3 | 6–10 | 7–9 | 5–11 | 6–10 | — |

=== Roster ===
1882 Philadelphia Athletics
Roster
| Pitchers: Ed Halbriter; Doc Landis; Frank Mountain; Charlie Reynolds; George Snyder; Bill Sweeney; Sam Weaver | Catchers: Tug Arundel; Jerry Dorgan; Jack O'Brien; Joe Straub; Infielders: Juice Latham; Fred Mann; Jimmy Say; Lou Say; Pop Smith; Cub Stricker | Outfielders: Jud Birchall; Bob Blakiston; Bill Farrell; Bill Greenwood; Bill Kienzle; John Mansell; John Richmond | Manager: Juice Latham |

== Player stats ==
=== Batting ===
==== Starters by position ====
Note: Pos = Position; G = Games played; AB = At bats; H = Hits; Avg. = Batting average; HR = Home runs; RBI = Runs batted in

| Pos | Player | G | AB | H | Avg. | HR | RBI |
|---|---|---|---|---|---|---|---|
| C | Jack O'Brien | 62 | 241 | 73 | .303 | 3 | 37 |
| 1B | Juice Latham | 74 | 323 | 92 | .285 | 0 | 38 |
| 2B | Cub Stricker | 72 | 272 | 59 | .217 | 0 | 18 |
| 3B | Fred Mann | 29 | 121 | 28 | .231 | 0 | ? |
| SS | Lou Say | 49 | 199 | 45 | .226 | 1 | 28 |
| OF | John Mansell | 31 | 126 | 30 | .238 | 0 | 17 |
| OF | Jud Birchall | 75 | 338 | 89 | .263 | 0 | 27 |
| OF | Bob Blakiston | 72 | 281 | 64 | .228 | 0 | 20 |

==== Other batters ====
Note: G = Games played; AB = At bats; H = Hits; Avg. = Batting average; HR = Home runs; RBI = Runs batted in

| Player | G | AB | H | Avg. | HR | RBI |
|---|---|---|---|---|---|---|
| Jerry Dorgan | 44 | 181 | 51 | .282 | 0 | 24 |
| Jimmy Say | 22 | 82 | 17 | .207 | 1 | ? |
| Pop Smith | 20 | 65 | 6 | .092 | 0 | 2 |
| John Richmond | 18 | 65 | 12 | .185 | 0 | 4 |
| Bill Kienzle | 9 | 33 | 11 | .333 | 0 | 9 |
| Joe Straub | 8 | 32 | 6 | .188 | 0 | 1 |
| Bill Greenwood | 7 | 30 | 9 | .300 | 0 | 1 |
| Bill Farrell | 2 | 7 | 2 | .286 | 0 | 1 |
| Tug Arundel | 1 | 5 | 0 | .000 | 0 | ? |

=== Pitching ===
==== Starting pitchers ====
Note: G = Games pitched; IP = Innings pitched; W = Wins; L = Losses; ERA = Earned run average; SO = Strikeouts

| Player | G | IP | W | L | ERA | SO |
|---|---|---|---|---|---|---|
| Sam Weaver | 42 | 371.0 | 26 | 15 | 2.74 | 104 |
| Bill Sweeney | 20 | 170.0 | 9 | 10 | 2.91 | 48 |
| Frank Mountain | 8 | 69.0 | 2 | 6 | 3.91 | 15 |
| Doc Landis | 2 | 17.0 | 1 | 1 | 3.18 | 13 |
| Charlie Reynolds | 2 | 12.0 | 1 | 1 | 5.25 | 4 |
| George Snyder | 1 | 9.0 | 1 | 0 | 0.00 | 0 |
| Ed Halbriter | 1 | 8.0 | 0 | 1 | 7.88 | 4 |

==== Relief pitchers ====
Note: G = Games pitched; W = Wins; L = Losses; SV = Saves; ERA = Earned run average; SO = Strikeouts

| Player | G | W | L | SV | ERA | SO |
|---|---|---|---|---|---|---|
| Cub Stricker | 2 | 1 | 0 | 0 | 1.29 | 2 |
