= 1882 Louisville Eclipse season =

1882 Louisville Eclipse
- League: American Association
- Ballpark: Eclipse Park
- City: Louisville, Kentucky
- Record: 42–38 (.525)
- League place: 3rd
- Owners: W. L. Lyons, Zach Phelps, W. L. Jackson, John Phelps
- Manager: Denny Mack

The 1882 Louisville Eclipse season was the first season as a Major League club for the franchise. The team, which had played for several years as a semi-pro team, joined the new American Association league. They finished the season with a 42–38 record, good for third place.

== Regular season ==
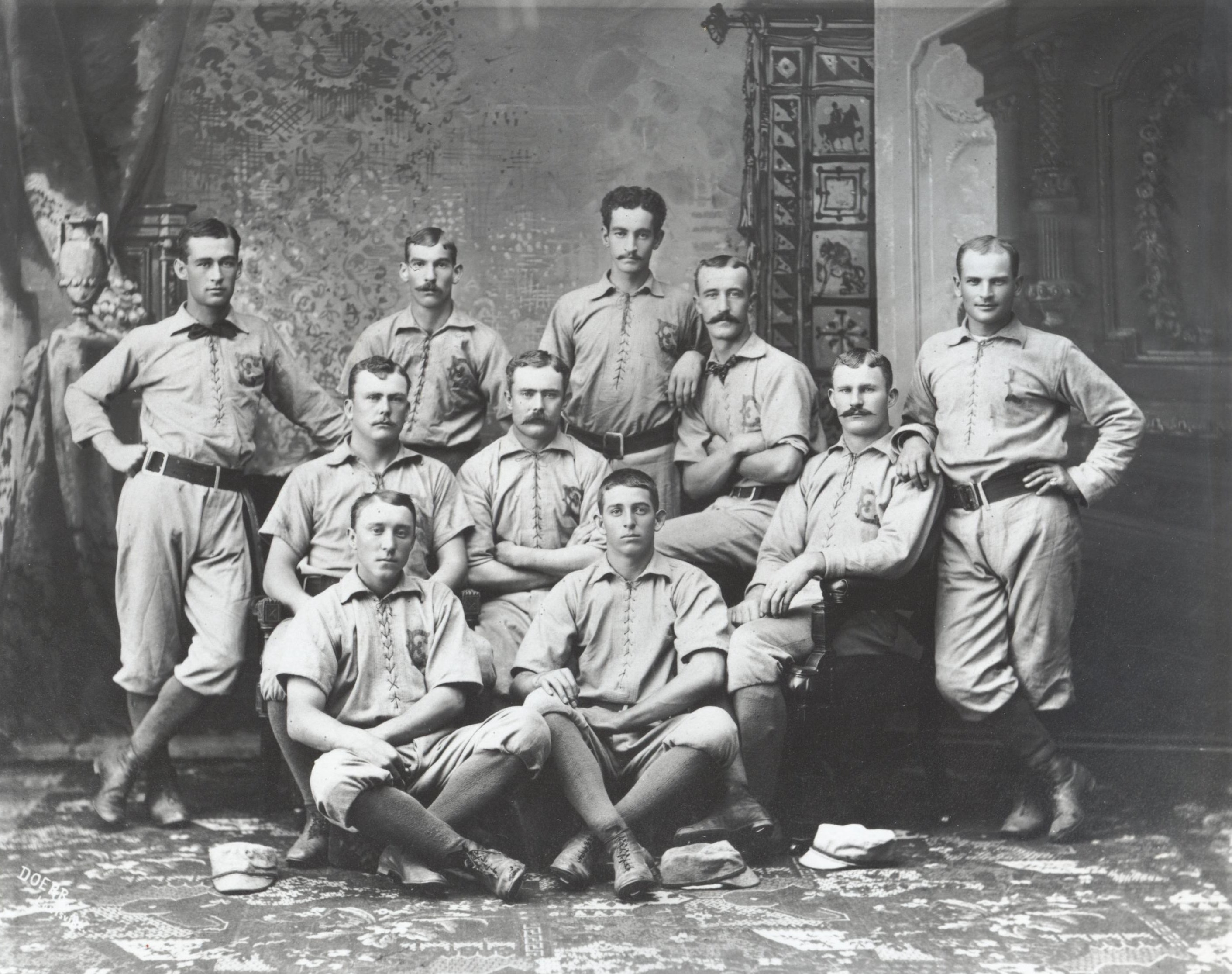
1882 Louisville Eclipse

=== Season standings ===
American Association
Team	W	L	Pct.	GB	Home	Road
Cincinnati Red Stockings	55	25	.688	—	31‍–‍11	24‍–‍14
Philadelphia Athletics	41	34	.547	11½	21‍–‍18	20‍–‍16
Louisville Eclipse	42	38	.525	13	26‍–‍13	16‍–‍25
Pittsburgh Alleghenys	39	39	.500	15	17‍–‍20	22‍–‍19
St. Louis Brown Stockings	37	43	.463	18	24‍–‍20	13‍–‍23
Baltimore Orioles	19	54	.260	32½	7‍–‍25	12‍–‍29

=== Record vs. opponents ===
1882 American Association record Sources:
Team	BAL	CIN	LOU	PHA	PIT	STL
Baltimore	—	2–14	3–13	4–7	7–7–1	3–13
Cincinnati	14–2	—	11–5	10–6	10–6	10–6
Louisville	13–3	5–11	—	5–11	10–6	9–7
Philadelphia	7–4	6–10	11–5	—	6–10	11–5
Pittsburgh	7–7–1	6–10	6–10	10–6	—	10–6
St. Louis	13–3	6–10	7–9	5–11	6–10	—

=== Roster ===
1882 Louisville Eclipse
Roster
Pitchers: Tony Mullane; Catchers: Joe Crotty; Charles Strick; Dan Sullivan	Infielders: Amos Booth; Pete Browning; Guy Hecker; Denny Mack; Harry McCaffery; Gracie Pierce; Jimmy Say; Bill Schenck; Pop Smith	Outfielders: Charlie Bohn; John Dyler; Harry Maskrey; Leech Maskrey; Ed Merrill; John Reccius; Phil Reccius; Jimmy Wolf	Manager: Denny Mack

== Player stats ==
=== Batting ===
==== Starters by position ====
Note: Pos = Position; G = Games played; AB = At bats; H = Hits; Avg. = Batting average; HR = Home runs

Pos	Player	G	AB	H	Avg.	HR
C	Dan Sullivan	67	286	78	.273	0
1B	Guy Hecker	78	340	94	.276	3
2B	Pete Browning	69	288	109	.378	5
3B	Bill Schenck	60	231	60	.260	0
SS	Denny Mack	72	264	48	.182	0
OF	John Reccius	74	266	63	.237	1
OF	Jimmy Wolf	78	318	95	.299	0
OF	Leech Maskrey	76	288	65	.226	0

==== Other batters ====
Note: G = Games played; AB = At bats; H = Hits; Avg. = Batting average; HR = Home runs

Player	G	AB	H	Avg.	HR
Charles Strick	32	110	18	.164	0
Gracie Pierce	9	33	10	.303	0
Joe Crotty	5	20	2	.100	0
Phil Reccius	4	15	2	.133	0
Charlie Bohn	4	13	2	.154	0
Pop Smith	3	11	2	.182	0
Amos Booth	1	4	0	.000	0
Harry Maskrey	1	4	0	.000	0
John Dyler	1	4	0	.000	0
Harry McCaffery	1	4	1	.250	0
Jimmy Say	1	4	1	.250	0

=== Pitching ===
==== Starting pitchers ====
Note: G = Games pitched; IP = Innings pitched; W = Wins; L = Losses; ERA = Earned run average; SO = Strikeouts

Player	G	IP	W	L	ERA	SO
Tony Mullane	55	460.1	30	24	1.88	170
Guy Hecker	13	104.0	6	6	1.30	33
John Reccius	13	95.0	4	6	3.03	31
Charlie Bohn	2	18.0	1	1	3.00	1

==== Other pitchers ====
Note: G = Games pitched; IP = Innings pitched; W = Wins; L = Losses; ERA = Earned run average; SO = Strikeouts

Player	G	IP	W	L	ERA	SO
Bill Schenck	2	10.0	1	0	0.90	4

==== Relief pitchers ====
Note: G = Games pitched; W = Wins; L = Losses; SV = Saves; ERA = Earned run average; SO = Strikeouts

Player	G	W	L	SV	ERA	SO
Jimmy Wolf	1	0	0	0	9.00	1
