= 1882 St. Louis Brown Stockings season =

Major League Baseball season

1882 St. Louis Brown Stockings
- League: American Association
- Ballpark: Sportsman's Park
- City: St. Louis, Missouri
- Record: 37–43 (.463)
- League place: 5th
- Owner: Chris von der Ahe
- Manager: Ned Cuthbert
- Stats: ESPN.com; Baseball Reference

The 1882 St. Louis Brown Stockings season was the first professional baseball season played by the team now known as the St. Louis Cardinals. The team was founded in the earlier St. Louis Brown Stockings franchise. It played in the National Association league in 1875 and in the National League from 1876 to 1877. After a scandal over game-fixing, combined with financial problems, the St Louis Brown Stockings left the National League but continued to play as an independent team from 1878 to 1881. Chris von der Ahe, a German immigrant, purchased the team prior to the 1882 season and joined the new American Association. The St. Louis Brown Stockings posted a 37-43 game record in their first season in the American Association, giving them fifth place. The team played at the Grand Avenue Grounds (which was later renamed Sportsman's Park) at the corner of Grand Avenue and Dodier Street in north St. Louis.

== Building the team ==
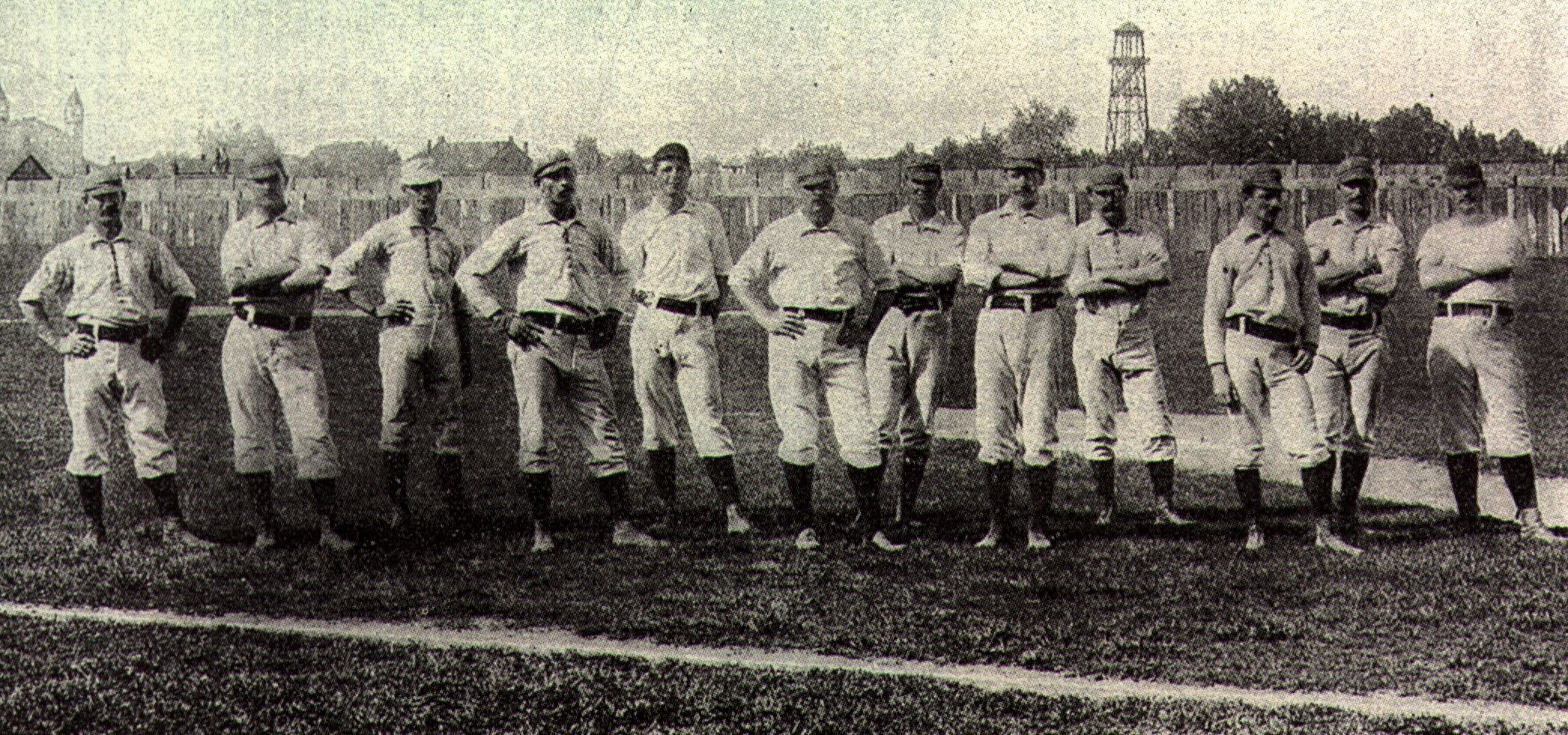
Team photograph

Before the 1882 season, Von der Ahe secured a place for the team in the American Association and provided funds to bring players to St. Louis. Between 1882 and 1892, the team he built went on to win four American Association titles.

Al Spink, the team advisor, recommended Von der Ahe sign Charlie Comiskey. Comiskey, who later played with the Chicago White Sox, was a skilled, young, first baseman who had been playing in Dubuque, Iowa.

Ned Cuthbert was a former professional player in St. Louis. Although he had retired from baseball and worked as a bartender in St. Louis, Cuthbert remained prominent in the local baseball community. He had encouraged Von der Ahe to purchase the team. Von der Ahe hired Cuthbert to be his first captain, with all the duties of a field manager. Cuthbert used his experience to attract several players to St. Louis from the East.

Most of the first-year Browns originated in St. Louis, including brothers Jack and Bill Gleason, pitcher Jumbo McGinnis, outfielder George Seward, and catcher Tom Sullivan.

== Regular season ==
In 1866, Gus Solari laid out a professional baseball field at Sportsman's Park, St Louis. Sixteen years later, on May 2, 1882, the opening day of the St. Louis Brown Stockings' 1882 season took place. Approximately 2,000 spectators watched the game for a fee of one quarter each. The team played numerous local teams in April exhibitions.

McGinnis was the first pitcher and he started 45 of the team's 80 games. Jack Gleason made the team's first hit. It was a lead off single in the first innings. He also scored the first run on Comiskey's three-base hit. The team won their first game with a score of 9 runs to 7. McGinnis contributed two doubles.

In late May 1882, the team was in a tie for first place in its six-team league. They were eight games over .500, putting them one game behind the Cincinnati Reds. There followed a seven-week period when the team lost sixteen more games than they won. They could not contend for the championship.

During the season, more than 175,000 spectators attended the team's games. The favorite players on the team were Comiskey and McGinnis.

=== Season standings ===
American Association
Team	W	L	Pct.	GB	Home	Road
Cincinnati Red Stockings	55	25	.688	—	31‍–‍11	24‍–‍14
Philadelphia Athletics	41	34	.547	11½	21‍–‍18	20‍–‍16
Louisville Eclipse	42	38	.525	13	26‍–‍13	16‍–‍25
Pittsburgh Alleghenys	39	39	.500	15	17‍–‍20	22‍–‍19
St. Louis Brown Stockings	37	43	.463	18	24‍–‍20	13‍–‍23
Baltimore Orioles	19	54	.260	32½	7‍–‍25	12‍–‍29

=== Record vs. opponents ===
1882 American Association record Sources:
Team	BAL	CIN	LOU	PHA	PIT	STL
Baltimore	—	2–14	3–13	4–7	7–7–1	3–13
Cincinnati	14–2	—	11–5	10–6	10–6	10–6
Louisville	13–3	5–11	—	5–11	10–6	9–7
Philadelphia	7–4	6–10	11–5	—	6–10	11–5
Pittsburgh	7–7–1	6–10	6–10	10–6	—	10–6
St. Louis	13–3	6–10	7–9	5–11	6–10	—

=== Roster ===
1882 St. Louis Brown Stockings
Roster
Pitchers: Morrie Critchley; Bert Dorr; John Doyle; Bob Hogan; Jumbo McGinnis; John Schappert	Catchers: Joe Crotty; Eddie Fusselback; Sleeper Sullivan; Infielders: Charles Comiskey; Frank Decker; Bill Gleason; Jack Gleason; Charlie Morton; John Shoupe; Bill Smiley	Outfielders: Ed Brown; Ned Cuthbert; Harry McCaffery; Bobby Mitchell; George Seward; Oscar Walker	Manager: Ned Cuthbert

== Player stats ==
=== Batting ===
==== Starters by position ====
Pos=Position, G=Games played, AB=At bats, R=Runs scored, H=Hits, 2B=Doubles, 3B=Triples, HR=Home runs, SB=Stolen bases, BB=Base on balls, Avg.=Batting average, Slg=Slugging percentage

Pos	Player	G	AB	R	H	2B	3B	Avg.	HR	SB	BB	Slg
C	Sleeper Sullivan	51	188	24	34	3	3	.181	0	0	3	.229
1B	Charles Comiskey	78	329	58	80	9	5	.243	1	0	4	.310
2B	Bill Smiley	59	240	30	51	4	2	.213	0	0	6	.246
3B	Jack Gleason	78	331	53	84	10	1	.254	2	0	27	.308
SS	Bill Gleason	79	347	63	100	11	6	.288	1	0	6	.363
OF	Oscar Walker	76	318	48	76	15	7	.239	7	0	10	.396
OF	Ned Cuthbert	60	233	28	52	16	5	.223	0	0	17	.335
OF	George Seward	38	144	23	31	1	1	.215	0	0	12	.236

==== Other batters ====
G=Games played, AB=At bats, R=Runs scored, H=Hits, 2B=Doubles, 3B=Triples, HR=Home runs, SB=Stolen bases, BB=Base on balls, Avg.=Batting average, Slg=Slugging percentage

Player	G	AB	R	H	2B	3B	Avg.	HR	SB	BB	Slg
Harry McCaffery	38	153	23	42	8	6	.275	0	0	3	.405
Eddie Fusselback	35	136	13	31	2	0	.228	0	0	5	.243
Ed Brown	17	60	4	11	0	0	.183	0	0	4	.183
Charlie Morton	9	32	2	2	0	1	.063	0	0	2	.125
Joe Crotty	8	28	2	4	1	0	.143	0	0	3	.179
Frank Decker	2	8	0	2	0	0	.250	0	0	?	.250
John Shoupe	2	7	1	0	0	0	.000	0	0	0	.000

=== Pitching ===
==== Starting pitchers ====
W=Wins, L=Losses, ERA=Earned run average, G=Games played, GS=Games started, CG=Complete games, IP=Innings pitched, H=Hits allowed, R=Runs allowed, ER=Earned runs allowed, HR=Home runs allowed, BB=Base on balls, SO=Strikeouts, WHIP=Walks plus hits per inning pitched

Player	W	L	ERA	G	GS	CG	IP	H	R	ER	HR	BB	SO	WHIP
Jumbo McGinnis	25	18	2.60	45	45	43	388.1	391	241	112	2	53	134	1.14
John Schappert	8	7	3.52	15	14	13	128.0	131	99	50	2	32	38	1.27
Bert Dorr	2	6	2.59	8	8	8	66.0	53	39	19	0	1	34	0.82
Morrie Critchley	0	4	4.24	4	4	4	34.0	43	31	16	3	7	2	1.47
John Doyle	0	3	2.63	3	3	3	24.0	41	33	7	0	3	5	1.83
Bob Hogan	0	1	1.13	1	1	1	8.0	10	7	1	0	0	4	1.25
Bobby Mitchell	0	1	7.71	1	1	0	7.0	12	13	6	0	2	2	2.00

==== Other pitchers ====
W=Wins, L=Losses, ERA=Earned run average, G=Games played, GS=Games started, CG=Complete games, SV=Saves, IP=Innings pitched, H=Hits allowed, R=Runs allowed, ER=Earned runs allowed, HR=Home runs allowed, BB=Base on balls, SO=Strikeouts, WHIP=Walks plus hits per inning pitched

Player	W	L	ERA	G	GS	CG	SV	IP	H	R	ER	HR	BB	SO	WHIP
Eddie Fusselback	1	2	4.70	4	2	2	1	23.0	34	24	12	0	2	3	1.57
Charles Comiskey	0	1	0.00	2	1	1	0	8.0	12	8	0	0	3	2	1.88

==== Relief pitchers ====
W=Wins, L=Losses, ERA=Earned run average, G=Games played, SV=Saves, IP=Innings pitched, H=Hits allowed, R=Runs allowed, ER=Earned runs allowed, HR=Home runs allowed, BB=Base on balls, SO=Strikeouts, WHIP=Walks plus hits per inning pitched

Player	W	L	ERA	G	SV	IP	H	R	ER	HR	BB	SO	WHIP
Ed Brown	0	0	0.00	1	0	2.0	2	1	0	0	0	1	1.00
