= 1882 Cincinnati Red Stockings season =

1882 Cincinnati Red Stockings
- American Association Champions
- League: American Association
- Ballpark: Bank Street Grounds
- City: Cincinnati
- Record: 55–25 (.688)
- League place: 1st
- Owner: Justus Thorner
- Manager: Pop Snyder

The 1882 Cincinnati Red Stockings season was a season in American baseball. It was the first season for the team as a member of the American Association. This team took the nickname from the previous National League team that played during 1876–1879, but was otherwise unrelated. The Red Stockings (sometimes called the "Reds") won the first American Association championship this season.

== Regular season ==
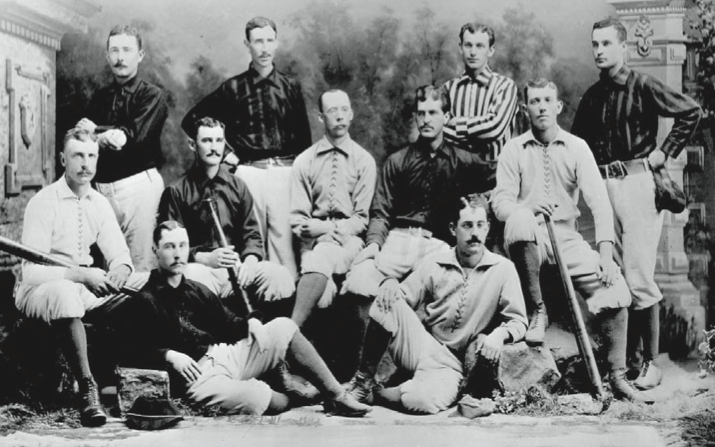
1882 Cincinnati Red Stockings

Before the season began, the Red Stockings named catcher Pop Snyder as the player-manager. Snyder spent the 1881 season with the Boston Red Caps of the National League, hitting .228 with 16 RBI. Cincinnati also signed some familiar players, as Will White and Hick Carpenter spent time with the Cincinnati Reds of the National League. White saw limited action with the Detroit Wolverines, while Carpenter hit .216 with two home runs and 31 RBI with the Worcester Worcesters during the 1881 season.

Carpenter had a breakout season, as he led the AA with 67 RBI and 120 hits, and led the Red Stockings with a .342 batting average. Snyder hit .291 with a homer and 50 RBI, while Joe Sommer hit .288 with a homer, 29 RBI and a team high 82 runs, while leading the league with 354 at-bats. On the mound, White returned to his 1879 form, as he led the AA with 40 wins, while posting a 1.54 ERA in 480 innings pitched.

The Red Stockings lost their first ever game, as the Pittsburgh Alleghenys defeated Cincinnati 10–9 at Bank Street Grounds. The team hovered around the .500 level, as they had a record of 8–9 record in their first 17 games, sitting in fourth place. The Red Stockings then went on a 10-game winning streak and rose to first place in the American Association. Cincinnati stayed hot for the rest of the season, finishing with a 55–25 record and winning the American Association pennant, 11.5 games ahead of the second place Philadelphia Athletics.

=== Season standings ===
American Association
Team	W	L	Pct.	GB	Home	Road
Cincinnati Red Stockings	55	25	.688	—	31‍–‍11	24‍–‍14
Philadelphia Athletics	41	34	.547	11½	21‍–‍18	20‍–‍16
Louisville Eclipse	42	38	.525	13	26‍–‍13	16‍–‍25
Pittsburgh Alleghenys	39	39	.500	15	17‍–‍20	22‍–‍19
St. Louis Brown Stockings	37	43	.463	18	24‍–‍20	13‍–‍23
Baltimore Orioles	19	54	.260	32½	7‍–‍25	12‍–‍29

=== Record vs. opponents ===
1882 American Association record Sources:
Team	BAL	CIN	LOU	PHA	PIT	STL
Baltimore	—	2–14	3–13	4–7	7–7–1	3–13
Cincinnati	14–2	—	11–5	10–6	10–6	10–6
Louisville	13–3	5–11	—	5–11	10–6	9–7
Philadelphia	7–4	6–10	11–5	—	6–10	11–5
Pittsburgh	7–7–1	6–10	6–10	10–6	—	10–6
St. Louis	13–3	6–10	7–9	5–11	6–10	—

=== Game log ===
Legend
Red Stockings Win	Red Stockings Loss	Game Tied/Postponed

1882 Game Log: 55–25 (Home: 31–11; Away: 24–14)
May: 8–8 (Home: 3–3; Away: 5–5)

#	Date	Opponent	Score	Stadium	Attendance	Record	Streak
1	May 2	Alleghenys	9–10	Bank Street Grounds	N/A	0–1	L1
2	May 3	Alleghenys	7–3	Bank Street Grounds	N/A	1–1	W1
3	May 4	Alleghenys	19–10	Bank Street Grounds	N/A	2–1	W2
–	May 6	Alleghenys	Postponed (unknown reason); Makeup: May 8				
4	May 8	Alleghenys	0–2	Bank Street Grounds	N/A	2–2	L1
–	May 9	Eclipse	Postponed (unknown reason); Makeup: September 13				
–	May 10	Eclipse	Postponed (unknown reason); Makeup: September 14				
–	May 11	Eclipse	Postponed (unknown reason); Makeup: September 28				
5	May 13	Eclipse	1–11	Bank Street Grounds	N/A	2–3	L2
6	May 16	Alleghenys	9–4	Bank Street Grounds	N/A	3–3	W1
7	May 18	@ Alleghenys	3–2	Exposition Park	N/A	4–3	W1
8	May 19	@ Alleghenys	7–8	Exposition Park	N/A	4–4	L1
9	May 20	@ Alleghenys	3–5	Exposition Park	N/A	4–5	L2
10	May 23	@ Orioles	12–8	Newington Park	N/A	5–5	W1
11	May 25	@ Orioles	5–6	Newington Park	N/A	5–6	L1
12	May 26	@ Orioles	8–4	Newington Park	N/A	6–6	W1
13	May 27	@ Orioles	6–1	Newington Park	N/A	7–6	W2
14	May 29	@ Athletics	9–10	Oakdale Park	N/A	7–7	L1
15	May 30	@ Athletics	10–5	Oakdale Park	N/A	8–7	W1
16	May 31	@ Athletics	1–10	Oakdale Park	N/A	8–8	L1

June: 12–2 (Home: 11–1; Away: 1–1)

#	Date	Opponent	Score	Stadium	Attendance	Record	Streak
17	June 1	@ Athletics	0–3	Oakdale Park	N/A	8–9	L2
18	June 2	@ Athletics	7–1	Oakdale Park	N/A	9–9	W1
19	June 6	Orioles	9–0	Bank Street Grounds	N/A	10–9	W2
20	June 7	Orioles	11–6	Bank Street Grounds	N/A	11–9	W3
21	June 8	Orioles	4–1	Bank Street Grounds	N/A	12–9	W4
22	June 10	Orioles	5–0	Bank Street Grounds	N/A	13–9	W5
23	June 13	Athletics	4–3	Bank Street Grounds	N/A	14–9	W6
24	June 15	Athletics	8–2	Bank Street Grounds	N/A	15–9	W7
25	June 17	Athletics	5–0	Bank Street Grounds	N/A	16–9	W8
26	June 20	Alleghenys	6–1	Bank Street Grounds	N/A	17–9	W9
27	June 22	Alleghenys	5–2	Bank Street Grounds	N/A	18–9	W10
28	June 23	Alleghenys	5–8	Bank Street Grounds	N/A	18–10	L1
29	June 24	Alleghenys	21–4	Bank Street Grounds	N/A	19–10	W1
30	June 28	Orioles	11–4	Bank Street Grounds	N/A	20–10	W2

July: 11–4 (Home: 2–1; Away: 9–3)

#	Date	Opponent	Score	Stadium	Attendance	Record	Streak
31	July 1	Orioles	6–0	Bank Street Grounds	N/A	21–10	W3
32	July 2	@ Eclipse	2–1	Eclipse Park	N/A	22–10	W4
33	July 4	Athletics	1–6	Bank Street Grounds	N/A	22–11	L1
34	July 6	@ Athletics	10–1	Oakdale Park	N/A	23–11	W1
35	July 7	@ Athletics	6–1	Oakdale Park	N/A	24–11	W2
36	July 8	@ Athletics	4–8	Oakdale Park	N/A	24–12	L1
37	July 11	@ Orioles	6–9	Newington Park	N/A	24–13	L1
38	July 13	@ Orioles	1–0	Newington Park	N/A	25–13	W1
39	July 14	@ Orioles	6–0	Newington Park	N/A	26–13	W2
40	July 15	@ Orioles	6–4	Newington Park	N/A	27–13	W3
–	July 18	@ Alleghenys	Postponed (unknown reason); Makeup: July 19				
41	July 19	@ Alleghenys	12–6	Exposition Park	N/A	28–13	W4
42	July 20	@ Alleghenys	2–3	Exposition Park	N/A	28–14	L1
43	July 21	@ Alleghenys	2–0	Exposition Park	N/A	29–14	W1
44	July 22	@ Alleghenys	3–2	Exposition Park	N/A	30–14	W2
45	July 29	Brown Stockings	5–3	Bank Street Grounds	N/A	31–14	W3

August: 11–6 (Home: 8–2; Away: 3–4)

#	Date	Opponent	Score	Stadium	Attendance	Record	Streak
46	August 1	Brown Stockings	0–1	Bank Street Grounds	N/A	31–15	L1
47	August 2	Brown Stockings	13–0	Bank Street Grounds	N/A	32–15	W1
48	August 3	Brown Stockings	8–3	Bank Street Grounds	N/A	33–15	W2
49	August 5	Brown Stockings	13–1	Bank Street Grounds	N/A	34–15	W4
50	August 6	@ Brown Stockings	3–6	Sportsman's Park	N/A	34–16	L1
51	August 8	@ Brown Stockings	5–2	Sportsman's Park	N/A	35–16	W1
52	August 10	@ Brown Stockings	3–4	Sportsman's Park	N/A	35–17	L1
53	August 12	@ Brown Stockings	19–1	Sportsman's Park	N/A	36–17	W1
54	August 15	Orioles	10–1	Bank Street Grounds	N/A	37–17	W2
55	August 19	Orioles	9–1	Bank Street Grounds	N/A	38–17	W3
56	August 22	Athletics	7–3	Bank Street Grounds	N/A	39–17	W4
57	August 23	Athletics	3–2	Bank Street Grounds	N/A	40–17	W5
58	August 25	Athletics	1–2	Bank Street Grounds	N/A	40–18	L1
59	August 26	Athletics	2–0	Bank Street Grounds	N/A	41–18	W1
60	August 27	@ Eclipse	3–0	Eclipse Park	N/A	42–18	W2
61	August 29	@ Eclipse	2–6	Eclipse Park	N/A	42–19	L1
62	August 31	@ Eclipse	2–3	Eclipse Park	N/A	42–20	L2

September: 13–5 (Home: 7–4; Away: 6–1)

#	Date	Opponent	Score	Stadium	Attendance	Record	Streak
63	September 2	@ Eclipse	6–2	Eclipse Park	N/A	43–20	W1
–	September 4	@ Brown Stockings	Postponed (unknown reason); Makeup: September 10				
64	September 5	@ Brown Stockings	7–3	Sportsman's Park	N/A	44–20	W2
65	September 7	@ Brown Stockings	4–1	Sportsman's Park	N/A	45–20	W3
66	September 9	@ Brown Stockings	3–4	Sportsman's Park	N/A	45–21	L1
67	September 10	@ Brown Stockings	9–1	Sportsman's Park	N/A	46–21	W1
68	September 11	Eclipse	0–2	Bank Street Grounds	N/A	46–22	L1
69	September 12	Eclipse	4–10	Bank Street Grounds	N/A	46–23	L2
70	September 13	Eclipse	3–1	Bank Street Grounds	N/A	47–23	W1
71	September 14	Eclipse	12–2	Bank Street Grounds	N/A	48–23	W2
72	September 15	Eclipse	10–4	Bank Street Grounds	N/A	49–23	W3
73	September 16	Eclipse	6–1	Bank Street Grounds	N/A	50–23	W4
–	September 17	Brown Stockings	Postponed (unknown reason); Makeup: September 19				
74	September 19	Brown Stockings	3–7	Bank Street Grounds	N/A	50–24	L1
–	September 20	Brown Stockings	Postponed (unknown reason); Makeup: September 22				
75	September 22	Brown Stockings	4–5	Bank Street Grounds	N/A	50–25	L2
76	September 23	Brown Stockings	4–1	Bank Street Grounds	N/A	51–25	W1
77	September 24	@ Eclipse	14–3	Eclipse Park	N/A	52–25	W2
78	September 25	@ Eclipse	8–4	Eclipse Park	N/A	53–25	W3
79	September 27	Eclipse	6–3	Bank Street Grounds	N/A	54–25	W4
80	September 28	Eclipse	1–0	Bank Street Grounds	N/A	55–25	W5

=== Roster ===
1882 Cincinnati Red Stockings
Roster
Pitchers: Harry McCormick; Will White; Catchers: Rudy Kemmler; Phil Powers; Pop Snyder	Infielders: Hick Carpenter; Chick Fulmer; Harry Luff; Bid McPhee; Dan Stearns; Bill Tierney	Outfielders: Jimmy Macullar; Joe Sommer; Tug Thompson; Harry Wheeler	Manager: Pop Snyder

== Player stats ==
=== Batting ===
==== Starters by position ====
Note: Pos = Position; G = Games played; AB = At bats; H = Hits; Avg. = Batting average; HR = Home runs; RBI = Runs batted in

Pos	Player	G	AB	H	Avg.	HR	RBI
C	Pop Snyder	72	309	90	.291	1	50
1B	Dan Stearns	49	214	55	.257	0	35
2B	Bid McPhee	78	311	71	.228	1	31
3B	Hick Carpenter	80	351	120	.342	1	67
SS	Chick Fulmer	79	324	91	.281	0	27
OF	Joe Sommer	80	354	102	.288	1	29
OF	Jimmy Macullar	79	299	70	.234	0	22
OF	Harry Wheeler	76	344	86	.250	1	29

==== Other batters ====
Note: G = Games played; AB = At bats; H = Hits; Avg. = Batting average; HR = Home runs; RBI = Runs batted in

Player	G	AB	H	Avg.	HR	RBI
Harry Luff	28	120	28	.233	0	6
Phil Powers	16	60	13	.217	0	5
Rudy Kemmler	3	11	1	.091	0	0
Tug Thompson	1	5	1	.200	0	0
Bill Tierney	1	5	0	.000	0	0

=== Pitching ===
==== Starting pitchers ====
Note: G = Games pitched; IP = Innings pitched; W = Wins; L = Losses; ERA = Earned run average; SO = Strikeouts

Player	G	IP	W	L	ERA	SO
Will White	54	480.0	40	12	1.54	122
Harry McCormick	25	219.2	14	11	1.52	33

==== Other pitchers ====
Note: G = Games pitched; IP = Innings pitched; W = Wins; L = Losses; ERA = Earned run average; SO = Strikeouts

Player	G	IP	W	L	ERA	SO
Harry Wheeler	4	21.2	1	2	5.40	10
