= Maskrey =

Maskrey is a surname. Notable people with the surname include:

- Harry Maskrey (1880–1927), English footballer
- Harry Maskrey (baseball) (1861–1930), American baseball player
- Leech Maskrey (1854–1922), American baseball player
- Steve Maskrey (born 1962), Scottish footballer

== See also ==
- Maskey
