= Buddy Baer =

American boxer and actor (1915–1986)

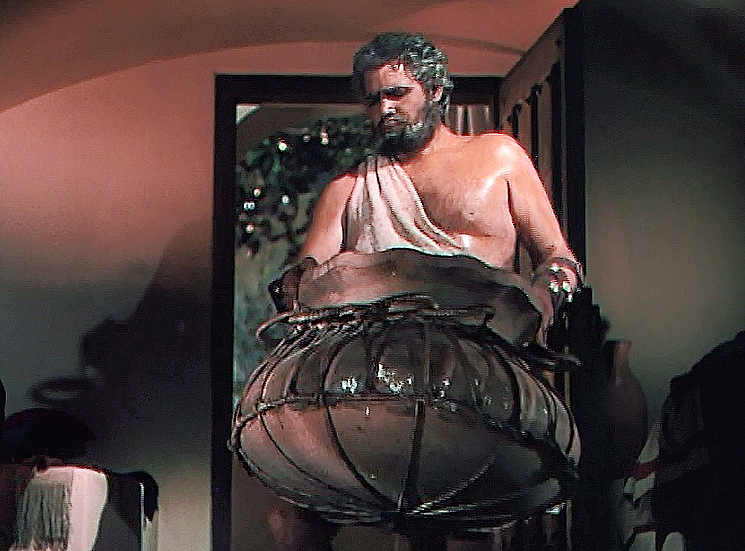

Personal information
- Born: Jacob Henry Baer; June 11, 1915 Denver, Colorado, U.S.
- Died: July 18, 1986 (aged 71) Martinez, California, U.S.
- Height: 6 ft 8 in (2.03 m)
- Weight: Heavyweight

Boxing career
- Reach: 84 in (213 cm)
- Stance: Orthodox

Boxing record
- Total fights: 66
- Wins: 59
- Win by KO: 53
- Losses: 7

Jacob Henry "Buddy" Baer (June 11, 1915 – July 18, 1986) was an American boxer and later an actor with parts in seventeen films, as well as roles on multiple television series in the 1950s and 1960s.

In 1941, he came extremely close to boxing stardom at Washington's Griffith Stadium, when in the opinion of most ringside officials, Joe Louis gave him a disqualifying late sixth-round hit in a title match that should have made Baer the world heavyweight champion. He lost to Louis in a rematch for the title the following year but remained solidly ranked among the top heavyweights in the early 1940s. In 2003, Baer was chosen for The Ring magazine's list of 100 greatest punchers of all time. He was the younger brother of boxing heavyweight champion and actor Max Baer, and the uncle of actor Max Baer Jr.

== Boxing career ==
Baer was born in Denver, Colorado, on June 11, 1915, to father Jacob, a butcher, and mother Dora Bales. However, a few sources, such as his brother Max, list his birthplace as Omaha, Nebraska. He moved with his family to California in 1928, living first in Livermore in 1926 and then Hayward, before settling in the early 1930s in Sacramento, where he would later retire. Both Buddy and his brother Max had a large Jewish following, for they claimed Jewish ancestry on their father's side and frequently wore a Star of David on their boxing trunks. Neither brother, however, appeared to be observant or openly religious, and their claims of Jewish heritage were questioned by trainer Ray Arcel. Standing at 6' 6 1/2" (1.99 m), Baer fought from 1934 to 1942. Baer's manager during the largest portion of his boxing career was Ancil Hoffman, who also managed Max's career for a period.

=== Early career ===
In his professional debut, Baer knocked out Tiny Abbott, 1:54 into the first round on September 23, 1934, in Eureka, California. A boxer of some repute, the towering 6' 8" Abbott had twice faced Baer's brother Max, and though it was Baer's first time in the ring, the more experienced Abbott was nearing the end of his career. Baer had a long winning streak following his debut fight until he met Babe Hunt. On January 10, 1935, Baer was defeated in a four-round bout, losing on points to Hunt at Boston's Rickard Recreation Center. The loss was Baer's first in thirteen straight fights, twelve of which Baer won by knockout. Though Hunt had a bad second round, he came back strongly in the third and fourth to win by unanimous decision.

He completed a technical knockout of Jack O'Dowd at 2:10 into the second round at Detroit's Olympia Stadium on January 4, 1935. On a ticket that included Joe Louis, the total audience reached 15,853. The crowd witnessed a performance from Baer, who outweighed his opponent by 29 pounds, less than his typical advantage. In an odd victory, O'Dowd, who seemed to lack the will to fight, was down five times in the first round, in a few instances without actually being hit. Though O'Dowd had faced the great Joe Louis the previous year, he showed no desire to mix with Baer and appeared thoroughly outmatched.

Frank Connolly, a former Golden Gloves champion, fell to Baer on March 20, 1935, in a convincing first-round knockout at the Oakland Auditorium before a substantial early-career crowd of 9,500. The final blow was a right hook that started low and came up with enormous power to knock out Connolly, who weighed 245, only a pound heavier than Baer.

Baer defeated Al Delaney on July 18, 1935, in a four-round knockout at Buffalo's Offerman Stadium. In a complete victory, Baer had Delaney down five times before the referee counted him out 34 seconds into the fourth round from a right behind the ear. In the opening round, Baer was knocked to his knees by a strong left, but he recovered, and had his own way for the rest of the match.

=== Match with Ford Smith ===
On the ticket of the Max Baer-Joe Louis match, he had one of his most lucrative bouts on September 4, 1935, when he lost a six-round wind-up match to Ford Smith in New York before an immense crowd of 90,000 fans at Yankee Stadium. Baer tried to overpower Smith in the early rounds with his punching ability, but Smith moved, blocked, and weathered the storm. In later rounds, Baer was less effective with intermittent looping blows that Smith countered with sharp, short punches to the body. Baer was tired in the last round, and though he had an advantage in reach and weight, he did little damage in his final rally, having lost speed and precision in his blows. The more experienced Smith took four of the six rounds. According to one source, his purse for the match, which was the most heavily attended in New York history, was $42,000. Louis, who won the title match against brother Max, had a purse of $200,000.

At this early stage of his career, Baer suffered a rare loss on April 22, 1936, dropping a six-round decision to Frenchman Andre Lenglet at Oakland's Municipal Auditorium. Baer looked strong in the first and had a brief rally in the fifth but lost his chance when Lenglet snapped back with a defense. One reporter, who wrote that Lenglet won each round by a large margin, noted that Baer failed to score with a telling blow throughout the match. Lenglet scored well with short left jabs to the face, and followups to the midriff and his frequent changes of pace confused Baer's ability to use his strong right.

In an important match on May 24, 1937, Baer outpointed Jack London, later the holder of the Commonwealth Boxing Council's Heavyweight title from 1944 to 1945. Baer won on points in a ten-round decision at Swansea, England, and though he had a significant advantage in height of nearly eight inches, he had only twenty pounds in weight over the sturdy London boxer. Two weeks earlier, Baer had defeated Jim Wilde at Harringay Arena in a fourth-round technical knockout. With dominance and punching power, he had Wilde down three times in the first round and for a count of eight in the third. After being knocked to the canvas for a count of five in the opening of the fourth, the referee called the match. British rules required ending a bout after five knockdowns.

=== Match with top contender Abe Simon ===
He brought a stop to seasoned Jewish heavyweight Abe Simon before 25,000 fans, on August 30, 1937, scoring a technical knockout at Yankee Stadium in 2:38 of the third round. Though Simon punished Baer severely in the first and had him hanging from the ropes with a two-fisted attack, Baer rallied in the second with sharp left jabs and a stinging right cross and had Simon down and then staggering in the third when the referee called the fight. Both fighters had exceptional weight and reach and though Baer had a two-inch advantage in height, Simon, a giant himself, actually outweighed Baer by seven pounds.

=== Painful loss to Gunnar Barlund ===
Baer lost to gifted Finnish boxer Gunnar Barlund on March 4, 1938, before 8,565 fans in a seventh-round technical knockout at Madison Square Garden. Baer had a forty-pound weight advantage over Barlund, and 5 1/2-inch advantage in height, but lacked stamina and heart as the fight progressed. Baer performed well in the first, cutting Barlund's forehead and nose with stinging left jabs and an occasional right, while Barlund lost points for low blows. In the second, however, Gunnar reached Baer with a few punches and then getting his range, took the second, third, and fourth. Baer maintained an edge in the fifth, and though both showed fatigue, Gunnar took the sixth, scoring at least ten straight rights and lefts without a return. In the seventh, Barlund drove Baer into the ropes with a heavy barrage. He followed him across the ring when Baer retreated and continued his attack, Baer seeming to give up, dropping his hands to his sides during the attack, and after coming from a clinch signaling the referee to end the fight. The referee asked Baer, apparently hurt, if he wished to continue, and decided to stop the fight, 1:36 into the seventh. Baer made no excuses for his performances but believed his layoff from the ring had affected his timing and ability to connect punches, particularly his right. Barlund successfully circled away from Baer's hard overhand right.

=== Three wins; Savold, Mann, and Blackshear ===
He defeated Lee Savold in an important match on October 30, 1939, in an eight-round newspaper decision before 3,500 in Des Moine, Iowa. After a brief exchange, Baer had his opponent down for a count of eight in the first round from a right uppercut, and though Savold battled hard in the remaining rounds, he struggled to connect blows after his rough first round. Most reporters gave five rounds to Baer with only two to Savold in the hotly contested match.

He defeated Nathan Mann on May 3, 1940, before 5000, in a seventh-round technical knockout at New York's Madison Square Garden. In the match, Baer took the first four rounds, but Mann took the next four with cutting hooks to the head and body. A savage right hook in the opening of the seventh severely cut Mann's eye, causing his handlers to end the fight.

Winning in a three-round technical knockout before 4,000 fans, he defeated accomplished boxer Harold Blackshear, who maintained a winning record and a 50% knockout percentage, on December 17, 1940, at Oakland's Auditorium. Baer had the advantages of roughly five inches in reach, 5.5 inches in height, and 49 pounds in weight, as well as his superior punching ability. He toyed with Blackshear for the first two-and-a-half rounds, before commencing a clubbing and brutal assault in the third that led to the end of the charity bout. Many at ringside considered the bout a mismatch. Although he pocketed $2,500 for the contest, Baer had faced stronger opposition in the recent past, as Blackshear had dropped his last two fights, suffering a loss and a strong knockout.

=== Loss to Eddie Blunt in Oakland ===
Baer lost to Eddie Blunt on January 15, 1941, at the Auditorium in Oakland in a ten-round points decision. Though Baer was a 3-1 favorite in the early betting, Blunt won eight of the ten rounds. Despite a weight disadvantage of twenty-four pounds, Blunt kept Baer off balance with long lefts and stiff uppercuts throughout the match, and by the fifth had cut Baer's eyes, after which Baer kept losing ground. The fifth through seventh rounds were hard fought with both boxers fighting toe to toe. Though Baer attempted a rally in the tenth, it was far too late to make up the points differential, though he managed to win the round. In the words of one reporter, "Baer took one of the most beautiful shellackings of his erratic career". Baer required stitches above both eyes, and it was evident he would need a break before his next fight.

In a ramp up to a heavyweight title match, he defeated colorful contender Tony Galento before 8,500 fans on April 8, 1941, in a seventh-round technical knockout in Washington, D.C., when Galento had to discontinue the bout due to a broken hand. Galento took the first round backing Baer into the ropes with a few hard rights, but the second was even, and Baer took the remaining rounds. Baer used his superior reach in the remaining rounds to keep Galento from boring in, and in the fourth, he staggered Galento with a hard right to the mouth. Another solid blow in the sixth caused Galento to lose his mouthpiece, and there were some hard punches, but the match featured no knockdowns. The win was a solid one for Baer. Baer succeeded in connecting with solid lefts to Galento's head and both lefts and rights to his body.

=== World heavyweight title contender ===
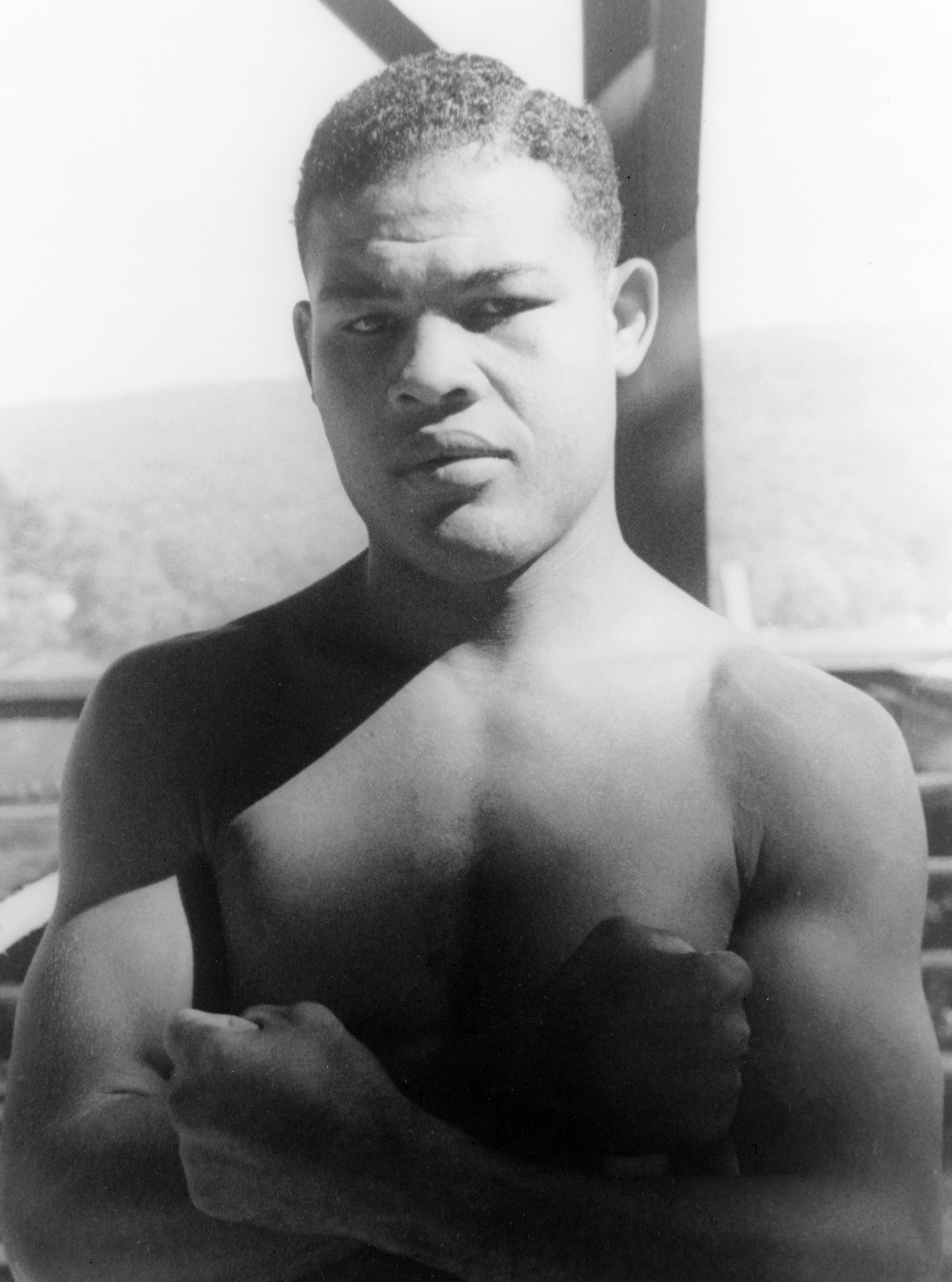
Joe Louis, 1941

The highlight of his boxing career came in his two attempts to take the heavyweight boxing championship from Joe Louis. In their first fight on May 23, 1941, Baer caught Louis with a powerful left hook in the first round and knocked the champion out of the ring. Louis, however, hurt but unfazed, climbed back in before the count of ten, though many ringside believed Louis benefited from a long count. Louis eventually won the fight on a disqualification after he had knocked down Baer three times in the sixth. Baer claimed that his third knockdown came shortly after the bell had rung to end the sixth round. In the seventh, when Baer's handlers refused to leave the ring as they protested what they believed was a late hit in the sixth, the referee, Arthur Donovan, disqualified Baer in a technical knockout for not resuming the match. In a controversial decision, the referee believed the last hit came before or during the final bell, but most ringside officials, including the official timekeeper, knockdown timekeeper, and both judges believed the final blow came after the bell, which should have disqualified Louis. The final decision of the boxing commissioner favored the referee, and Louis retained the title. Regardless of the decision, many ringside believed Louis would have eventually won the fight, as he punished Baer repeatedly in the sixth, and had fully recovered from his knockdown in the first. Baer, nonetheless, came closer to defeating Louis and taking the title than any of the other opponents Louis would face, until losing to Ezzard Charles in 1950.

In their rematch in Madison Square Garden, on January 9, 1942, before an estimated crowd of 19,000, Louis knocked Baer out in the first, after downing him two previous times. His second knockdown, after a barrage of blows and a thundering left hook, resulted in a count of nine. After rising to his feet again, Baer was battered around the ring and floored for the last time with a straight right to the head that put him down for a seven count. Unable to get up, the count was completed and the fight ended. Baer subsequently remarked, "The only way I could have beaten Louis that night was with a baseball bat." A year later he said, "I had to quit. I injured my neck in an auto crash before the fight".

=== Professional boxing record ===
All information in this section is derived from BoxRec, unless otherwise stated.

=== Official record ===
66 fights	57 wins	7 losses
By knockout	53	2
By decision	4	4
By disqualification	0	1
Newspaper decisions/draws	2	

All newspaper decisions are officially regarded as “no decision” bouts and are not counted in the win/loss/draw column.

No.	Result	Record	Opponent	Type	Round, time	Date	Age	Location	Notes
66	Loss	57–7 (2)	Joe Louis	KO	1 (15), 2:56	Jan 9, 1942	26 years, 212 days	Madison Square Garden, New York City, New York, U.S.	For NYSAC, NBA, and The Ring heavyweight titles
65	Loss	57–6 (2)	Joe Louis	DQ	7 (15), 3:00	May 23, 1941	25 years, 346 days	Griffith Stadium, Washington, D.C., U.S.	For NYSAC, NBA, and The Ring heavyweight titles; Baer disqualified after his manager refused to leave the ring
64	Win	57–5 (2)	Tony Galento	TKO	7 (10)	Apr 8, 1941	25 years, 301 days	Uline Arena, Washington, D.C., U.S.	
63	Loss	56–5 (2)	Eddie Blunt	PTS	10	Jan 15, 1941	25 years, 218 days	Auditorium, Oakland, California, U.S.	
62	Win	56–4 (2)	Harold Blackshear	TKO	3 (10), 2:45	Dec 17, 1940	25 years, 189 days	Auditorium, Oakland, California, U.S.	
61	Win	55–4 (2)	Valentin Campolo	KO	1 (12), 1:53	Jun 6, 1940	24 years, 361 days	Madison Square Garden, New York City, New York, U.S.	
60	Win	54–4 (2)	Nathan Mann	TKO	7 (12), 1:36	May 3, 1940	24 years, 327 days	Madison Square Garden, New York City, New York, U.S.	
59	Win	53–4 (2)	Lee Savold	NWS	8	Oct 30, 1938	23 years, 141 days	Coliseum, Des Moines, Iowa, U.S.	
58	Win	53–4 (1)	Charley Neaves	KO	2 (10)	Oct 13, 1938	23 years, 124 days	Municipal Auditorium, Kansas City, Missouri, U.S.	
57	Win	52–4 (1)	Maxie Doyle	TKO	3 (10)	Oct 12, 1938	23 years, 123 days	Little Rock, Wyoming, U.S.	
56	Win	51–4 (1)	Sandy McDonald	KO	2 (10)	Oct 5, 1938	23 years, 116 days	Hubber Park, Lubbock, Texas, U.S.	
55	Win	50–4 (1)	Big Boy Brackey	TKO	2 (10), 1:10	Apr 4, 1938	22 years, 297 days	Olympic Auditorium, Los Angeles, California, U.S.	
54	Win	49–4 (1)	Chuck Crowell	KO	1 (10), 0:54	Mar 10, 1938	22 years, 272 days	Madison Square Garden, New York City, New York, U.S.	
53	Loss	48–4 (1)	Gunnar Bärlund	TKO	7 (10)	Mar 4, 1938	22 years, 266 days	Madison Square Garden, New York City, New York, U.S.	
52	Win	48–3 (1)	Eddie Hogan	TKO	3 (10), 2:21	Dec 17, 1937	22 years, 189 days	Madison Square Garden, New York City, New York, U.S.	
51	Win	47–3 (1)	Abe Simon	TKO	3 (6), 2:38	Aug 30, 1937	22 years, 80 days	Yankee Stadium, New York City, New York, U.S.	
50	Win	46–3 (1)	Jack London	PTS	10	May 24, 1937	21 years, 347 days	Vetch Field, Swansea, Wales	
49	Win	45–3 (1)	Jim Wilde	TKO	4 (10)	May 6, 1937	21 years, 329 days	Harringay Arena, Harringay, London, England	
48	Win	44–3 (1)	Patrick Michael Barry	KO	1 (10), 2:46	Dec 9, 1936	21 years, 181 days	Chicago Stadium, Chicago, Illinois, U.S.	
47	Win	43–3 (1)	Salvatore Ruggirello	KO	2 (10)	Oct 19, 1936	21 years, 130 days	Maple Leaf Gardens, Toronto, Ontario, Canada	
46	Win	42–3 (1)	Art Oliver	KO	4 (6)	Oct 8, 1936	21 years, 119 days	Platteville, Wisconsin, U.S.	
45	Win	41–3 (1)	Babe Davis	KO	6 (6)	Oct 6, 1936	21 years, 117 days	Coliseum, Evansville, Indiana, U.S.	
44	Win	40–3 (1)	Verne Trickle	KO	5 (6)	Sep 21, 1936	21 years, 102 days	Sheldon, Iowa, U.S.	
43	Win	39–3 (1)	Pret Ferrar	NWS	6	Sep 14, 1936	21 years, 95 days	Coliseum, Des Moines, Iowa, U.S.	
42	Win	39–3	Fred Schultz	KO	1 (4), 1:28	Sep 7, 1936	21 years, 88 days	Rock Springs, Wyoming, U.S.	
41	Win	38–3	Babe Hunt	KO	1 (6)	Sep 4, 1936	21 years, 85 days	Rock Springs, Wyoming, U.S.	
40	Win	37–3	Jack Conroy	KO	1 (10)	Sep 2, 1936	21 years, 83 days	Lincoln Field, Twin Falls, Idaho, U.S.	
39	Win	36–3	James J. Russell	KO	1 (6)	Aug 31, 1936	21 years, 81 days	Memorial Ball Park, Coeur d'Alene, Idaho, U.S.	
38	Win	35–3	Don Baxter	PTS	6	Aug 29, 1936	21 years, 79 days	Recreation Park, Lewiston, Idaho, U.S.	
37	Win	34–3	Bill Devere	KO	2 (6), 0:07	Aug 25, 1936	21 years, 75 days	Multnomah Stadium, Portland, Oregon, U.S.	
36	Win	33–3	Mickey Simpson	KO	2 (6)	Aug 24, 1936	21 years, 74 days	Armory, Marshfield, Oregon, U.S.	
35	Win	32–3	Ray Jarecki	KO	1 (6), 0:34	Jul 24, 1936	21 years, 43 days	Ogden Stadium, Ogden, Utah, U.S.	
34	Win	31–3	Rags Wood	KO	1 (4)	Jul 17, 1936	21 years, 36 days	Convention Hall, Ada, Oklahoma, U.S.	
33	Win	30–3	James Merriott	KO	1 (?)	Jul 16, 1936	21 years, 35 days	Coliseum, Tulsa, Oklahoma, U.S.	
32	Win	29–3	Charles Montgomery	KO	1 (4)	Jul 13, 1936	21 years, 32 days	Avey's Open-Air Arena, Oklahoma City, Oklahoma, U.S.	
31	Loss	28–3	Andre Lenglet	PTS	6	Apr 22, 1936	20 years, 316 days	Auditorium, Oakland, California, U.S.	
30	Win	28–2	Jack Petric	KO	1 (4)	Mar 25, 1936	20 years, 288 days	Auditorium, Oakland, California, U.S.	
29	Win	27–2	Harold Murphy	PTS	4	Mar 2, 1936	20 years, 265 days	Civic Auditorium, San Francisco, California, U.S.	
28	Win	26–2	Wally Hunt	KO	1 (4), 1:36	Feb 19, 1936	20 years, 253 days	Auditorium, Oakland, California, U.S.	
27	Loss	25–2	Ford Smith	PTS	6	Sep 24, 1935	20 years, 105 days	Yankee Stadium, New York City, New York, U.S.	
26	Win	25–1	Jack Doyle	KO	1 (6), 2:38	Aug 29, 1935	20 years, 79 days	Madison Square Garden, New York City, New York, U.S.	
25	Win	24–1	Artie Suess	TKO	4 (6)	Jul 26, 1935	20 years, 45 days	Boardwalk Arena, Long Branch, New Jersey, U.S.	
24	Win	23–1	Al Delaney	KO	4 (4), 0:34	Jul 18, 1935	20 years, 37 days	Offermann Stadium, Buffalo, New York, U.S.	
23	Win	22–1	Frank Wotanski	KO	1 (4), 0:54	Jun 25, 1935	20 years, 14 days	Yankee Stadium, New York City, New York, U.S.	
22	Win	21–1	Big Boy Brackey	KO	1 (4), 1:42	May 23, 1935	19 years, 346 days	Broadway Auditorium, Buffalo, New York, U.S.	
21	Win	20–1	Ed Anderson	PTS	4	Apr 18, 1935	19 years, 311 days	National Guard Armory, Kalamazoo, Michigan, U.S.	
20	Win	19–1	Tommy Davenport	KO	1 (6)	Apr 17, 1935	19 years, 310 days	I.M.A. Auditorium, Flint, Michigan, U.S.	
19	Win	18–1	John "Corn" Griffin	KO	2 (4)	Apr 12, 1935	19 years, 305 days	Chicago Stadium, Chicago, Illinois, U.S.	
18	Win	17–1	Harry Nelson	TKO	3 (10)	Apr 10, 1935	19 years, 303 days	Civic Auditorium, Grand Rapids, Michigan, U.S.	
17	Win	16–1	Frank Connolly	KO	1 (6)	Mar 20, 1935	19 years, 282 days	Auditorium, Oakland, California, U.S.	
16	Win	15–1	Tommy Davenport	KO	1 (10)	Jan 28, 1935	19 years, 231 days	Municipal Stadium, Miami, Florida, U.S.	
15	Win	14–1	Monty Hogan	KO	1 (4), 0:31	Jan 21, 1935	19 years, 224 days	Rikard Recreation Center, Boston, Massachusetts, U.S.	
14	Loss	13–1	Babe Hunt	PTS	4	Jan 10, 1935	19 years, 213 days	Rikard Recreation Center, Boston, Massachusetts, U.S.	
13	Win	13–0	Jack O'Dowd	TKO	1 (6), 2:10	Jan 4, 1935	19 years, 207 days	Olympia Stadium, Detroit, Michigan, U.S.	
12	Win	12–0	Gene Stanton	TKO	1 (6)	Dec 28, 1934	19 years, 200 days	Chicago Stadium, Chicago, Illinois, U.S.	
11	Win	11–0	Henry Surrette	KO	1 (4), 2:47	Dec 21, 1934	19 years, 193 days	Boston Garden, Boston, Massachusetts, U.S.	
10	Win	10–0	Bumbo Myers	KO	2 (4), 2:00	Dec 19, 1934	19 years, 191 days	Wheeling, West Virginia, U.S.	
9	Win	9–0	Bob Cook	KO	1 (6)	Dec 14, 1934	19 years, 186 days	Convention Hall, Kansas City, Missouri, U.S.	
8	Win	8–0	Mickey McGoorty	TKO	1 (6), 1:22	Dec 10, 1934	19 years, 182 days	Public Hall, Cleveland, Ohio, U.S.	
7	Win	7–0	Red Fields	TKO	1 (6), 0:50	Dec 6, 1934	19 years, 178 days	Coliseum, Des Moines, Iowa, U.S.	
6	Win	6–0	Johnny Baker	KO	2 (6), 0:35	Dec 4, 1934	19 years, 176 days	Waterloo Theatre, Waterloo, Iowa, U.S.	
5	Win	5–0	Frank Ketter	KO	1 (4), 0:25	Nov 23, 1934	19 years, 165 days	Chicago Stadium, Chicago, Illinois, U.S.	
4	Win	4–0	Gene Garner	KO	1 (6), 1:31	Nov 13, 1934	19 years, 155 days	Olympic Auditorium, Los Angeles, California, U.S.	
3	Win	3–0	Jack Petric	KO	5 (6)	Oct 24, 1934	19 years, 135 days	Auditorium, Oakland, California, U.S.	
2	Win	2–0	Max Brown	KO	1 (4), 1:30	Oct 10, 1934	19 years, 121 days	Auditorium, Oakland, California, U.S.	
1	Win	1–0	Tiny Abbott	KO	1 (8), 1:54	Sep 23, 1934	19 years, 104 days	Eureka, California, U.S.	

=== Unofficial record ===
66 fights	59 wins	7 losses
By knockout	53	2
By decision	6	4
By disqualification	0	1

Record with the inclusion of newspaper decisions in the win/loss/draw column.

No.	Result	Record	Opponent	Type	Round, time	Date	Age	Location	Notes
66	Loss	59–7	Joe Louis	KO	1 (15), 2:56	Jan 9, 1942	26 years, 212 days	Madison Square Garden, New York City, New York, U.S.	For NYSAC, NBA, and The Ring heavyweight titles
65	Loss	59–6	Joe Louis	DQ	7 (15), 3:00	May 23, 1941	25 years, 346 days	Griffith Stadium, Washington, D.C., U.S.	For NYSAC, NBA, and The Ring heavyweight titles; Baer disqualified after his manager refused to leave the ring
64	Win	59–5	Tony Galento	TKO	7 (10)	Apr 8, 1941	25 years, 301 days	Uline Arena, Washington, D.C., U.S.	
63	Loss	58–5	Eddie Blunt	PTS	10	Jan 15, 1941	25 years, 218 days	Auditorium, Oakland, California, U.S.	
62	Win	58–4	Harold Blackshear	TKO	3 (10), 2:45	Dec 17, 1940	25 years, 189 days	Auditorium, Oakland, California, U.S.	
61	Win	57–4	Valentin Campolo	KO	1 (12), 1:53	Jun 6, 1940	24 years, 361 days	Madison Square Garden, New York City, New York, U.S.	
60	Win	56–4	Nathan Mann	TKO	7 (12), 1:36	May 3, 1940	24 years, 327 days	Madison Square Garden, New York City, New York, U.S.	
59	Win	55–4	Lee Savold	NWS	8	Oct 30, 1938	23 years, 141 days	Coliseum, Des Moines, Iowa, U.S.	
58	Win	54–4	Charley Neaves	KO	2 (10)	Oct 13, 1938	23 years, 124 days	Municipal Auditorium, Kansas City, Missouri, U.S.	
57	Win	53–4	Maxie Doyle	TKO	3 (10)	Oct 12, 1938	23 years, 123 days	Little Rock, Wyoming, U.S.	
56	Win	52–4	Sandy McDonald	KO	2 (10)	Oct 5, 1938	23 years, 116 days	Hubber Park, Lubbock, Texas, U.S.	
55	Win	51–4	Big Boy Brackey	TKO	2 (10), 1:10	Apr 4, 1938	22 years, 297 days	Olympic Auditorium, Los Angeles, California, U.S.	
54	Win	50–4	Chuck Crowell	KO	1 (10), 0:54	Mar 10, 1938	22 years, 272 days	Madison Square Garden, New York City, New York, U.S.	
53	Loss	49–4	Gunnar Bärlund	TKO	7 (10)	Mar 4, 1938	22 years, 266 days	Madison Square Garden, New York City, New York, U.S.	
52	Win	49–3	Eddie Hogan	TKO	3 (10), 2:21	Dec 17, 1937	22 years, 189 days	Madison Square Garden, New York City, New York, U.S.	
51	Win	48–3	Abe Simon	TKO	3 (6), 2:38	Aug 30, 1937	22 years, 80 days	Yankee Stadium, New York City, New York, U.S.	
50	Win	47–3	Jack London	PTS	10	May 24, 1937	21 years, 347 days	Vetch Field, Swansea, Wales	
49	Win	46–3	Jim Wilde	TKO	4 (10)	May 6, 1937	21 years, 329 days	Harringay Arena, Harringay, London, England	
48	Win	45–3	Patrick Michael Barry	KO	1 (10), 2:46	Dec 9, 1936	21 years, 181 days	Chicago Stadium, Chicago, Illinois, U.S.	
47	Win	44–3	Salvatore Ruggirello	KO	2 (10)	Oct 19, 1936	21 years, 130 days	Maple Leaf Gardens, Toronto, Ontario, Canada	
46	Win	43–3	Art Oliver	KO	4 (6)	Oct 8, 1936	21 years, 119 days	Platteville, Wisconsin, U.S.	
45	Win	42–3	Babe Davis	KO	6 (6)	Oct 6, 1936	21 years, 117 days	Coliseum, Evansville, Indiana, U.S.	
44	Win	41–3	Verne Trickle	KO	5 (6)	Sep 21, 1936	21 years, 102 days	Sheldon, Iowa, U.S.	
43	Win	40–3	Pret Ferrar	NWS	6	Sep 14, 1936	21 years, 95 days	Coliseum, Des Moines, Iowa, U.S.	
42	Win	39–3	Fred Schultz	KO	1 (4), 1:28	Sep 7, 1936	21 years, 88 days	Rock Springs, Wyoming, U.S.	
41	Win	38–3	Babe Hunt	KO	1 (6)	Sep 4, 1936	21 years, 85 days	Rock Springs, Wyoming, U.S.	
40	Win	37–3	Jack Conroy	KO	1 (10)	Sep 2, 1936	21 years, 83 days	Lincoln Field, Twin Falls, Idaho, U.S.	
39	Win	36–3	James J. Russell	KO	1 (6)	Aug 31, 1936	21 years, 81 days	Memorial Ball Park, Coeur d'Alene, Idaho, U.S.	
38	Win	35–3	Don Baxter	PTS	6	Aug 29, 1936	21 years, 79 days	Recreation Park, Lewiston, Idaho, U.S.	
37	Win	34–3	Bill Devere	KO	2 (6), 0:07	Aug 25, 1936	21 years, 75 days	Multnomah Stadium, Portland, Oregon, U.S.	
36	Win	33–3	Mickey Simpson	KO	2 (6)	Aug 24, 1936	21 years, 74 days	Armory, Marshfield, Oregon, U.S.	
35	Win	32–3	Ray Jarecki	KO	1 (6), 0:34	Jul 24, 1936	21 years, 43 days	Ogden Stadium, Ogden, Utah, U.S.	
34	Win	31–3	Rags Wood	KO	1 (4)	Jul 17, 1936	21 years, 36 days	Convention Hall, Ada, Oklahoma, U.S.	
33	Win	30–3	James Merriott	KO	1 (?)	Jul 16, 1936	21 years, 35 days	Coliseum, Tulsa, Oklahoma, U.S.	
32	Win	29–3	Charles Montgomery	KO	1 (4)	Jul 13, 1936	21 years, 32 days	Avey's Open-Air Arena, Oklahoma City, Oklahoma, U.S.	
31	Loss	28–3	Andre Lenglet	PTS	6	Apr 22, 1936	20 years, 316 days	Auditorium, Oakland, California, U.S.	
30	Win	28–2	Jack Petric	KO	1 (4)	Mar 25, 1936	20 years, 288 days	Auditorium, Oakland, California, U.S.	
29	Win	27–2	Harold Murphy	PTS	4	Mar 2, 1936	20 years, 265 days	Civic Auditorium, San Francisco, California, U.S.	
28	Win	26–2	Wally Hunt	KO	1 (4), 1:36	Feb 19, 1936	20 years, 253 days	Auditorium, Oakland, California, U.S.	
27	Loss	25–2	Ford Smith	PTS	6	Sep 24, 1935	20 years, 105 days	Yankee Stadium, New York City, New York, U.S.	
26	Win	25–1	Jack Doyle	KO	1 (6), 2:38	Aug 29, 1935	20 years, 79 days	Madison Square Garden, New York City, New York, U.S.	
25	Win	24–1	Artie Suess	TKO	4 (6)	Jul 26, 1935	20 years, 45 days	Boardwalk Arena, Long Branch, New Jersey, U.S.	
24	Win	23–1	Al Delaney	KO	4 (4), 0:34	Jul 18, 1935	20 years, 37 days	Offermann Stadium, Buffalo, New York, U.S.	
23	Win	22–1	Frank Wotanski	KO	1 (4), 0:54	Jun 25, 1935	20 years, 14 days	Yankee Stadium, New York City, New York, U.S.	
22	Win	21–1	Big Boy Brackey	KO	1 (4), 1:42	May 23, 1935	19 years, 346 days	Broadway Auditorium, Buffalo, New York, U.S.	
21	Win	20–1	Ed Anderson	PTS	4	Apr 18, 1935	19 years, 311 days	National Guard Armory, Kalamazoo, Michigan, U.S.	
20	Win	19–1	Tommy Davenport	KO	1 (6)	Apr 17, 1935	19 years, 310 days	I.M.A. Auditorium, Flint, Michigan, U.S.	
19	Win	18–1	John "Corn" Griffin	KO	2 (4)	Apr 12, 1935	19 years, 305 days	Chicago Stadium, Chicago, Illinois, U.S.	
18	Win	17–1	Harry Nelson	TKO	3 (10)	Apr 10, 1935	19 years, 303 days	Civic Auditorium, Grand Rapids, Michigan, U.S.	
17	Win	16–1	Frank Connolly	KO	1 (6)	Mar 20, 1935	19 years, 282 days	Auditorium, Oakland, California, U.S.	
16	Win	15–1	Tommy Davenport	KO	1 (10)	Jan 28, 1935	19 years, 231 days	Municipal Stadium, Miami, Florida, U.S.	
15	Win	14–1	Monty Hogan	KO	1 (4), 0:31	Jan 21, 1935	19 years, 224 days	Rikard Recreation Center, Boston, Massachusetts, U.S.	
14	Loss	13–1	Babe Hunt	PTS	4	Jan 10, 1935	19 years, 213 days	Rikard Recreation Center, Boston, Massachusetts, U.S.	
13	Win	13–0	Jack O'Dowd	TKO	1 (6), 2:10	Jan 4, 1935	19 years, 207 days	Olympia Stadium, Detroit, Michigan, U.S.	
12	Win	12–0	Gene Stanton	TKO	1 (6)	Dec 28, 1934	19 years, 200 days	Chicago Stadium, Chicago, Illinois, U.S.	
11	Win	11–0	Henry Surrette	KO	1 (4), 2:47	Dec 21, 1934	19 years, 193 days	Boston Garden, Boston, Massachusetts, U.S.	
10	Win	10–0	Bumbo Myers	KO	2 (4), 2:00	Dec 19, 1934	19 years, 191 days	Wheeling, West Virginia, U.S.	
9	Win	9–0	Bob Cook	KO	1 (6)	Dec 14, 1934	19 years, 186 days	Convention Hall, Kansas City, Missouri, U.S.	
8	Win	8–0	Mickey McGoorty	TKO	1 (6), 1:22	Dec 10, 1934	19 years, 182 days	Public Hall, Cleveland, Ohio, U.S.	
7	Win	7–0	Red Fields	TKO	1 (6), 0:50	Dec 6, 1934	19 years, 178 days	Coliseum, Des Moines, Iowa, U.S.	
6	Win	6–0	Johnny Baker	KO	2 (6), 0:35	Dec 4, 1934	19 years, 176 days	Waterloo Theatre, Waterloo, Iowa, U.S.	
5	Win	5–0	Frank Ketter	KO	1 (4), 0:25	Nov 23, 1934	19 years, 165 days	Chicago Stadium, Chicago, Illinois, U.S.	
4	Win	4–0	Gene Garner	KO	1 (6), 1:31	Nov 13, 1934	19 years, 155 days	Olympic Auditorium, Los Angeles, California, U.S.	
3	Win	3–0	Jack Petric	KO	5 (6)	Oct 24, 1934	19 years, 135 days	Auditorium, Oakland, California, U.S.	
2	Win	2–0	Max Brown	KO	1 (4), 1:30	Oct 10, 1934	19 years, 121 days	Auditorium, Oakland, California, U.S.	
1	Win	1–0	Tiny Abbott	KO	1 (8), 1:54	Sep 23, 1934	19 years, 104 days	Eureka, California, U.S.	

== After boxing ==
Baer retired from boxing after the second Louis bout and enlisted in the United States Army Air Forces at McClellan Air Force Base in 1942, the early years of America's involvement in World War II.

With the war over, and his Army discharge complete in September 1945, he returned to Sacramento and started his most successful business, Buddy Baer's Bar of Music at 1411 11th Street, which he opened with Fred Cullincini. He dabbled with less success in a variety of other businesses, including a health food store, a clothing shop, heavy equipment sales and real estate. After his brother Max's death in 1959 of a heart ailment, he served as the national chairman for the Fraternal Order of Eagles Max Baer Heart Fund. He later worked as a marshal or sergeant at arms for the California State Legislature in the 1970s. For a number of years he supported himself as a nightclub singer, putting his bass-baritone voice to use at such places as New York's Leon and Eddie's, and the Charles Club in Baltimore. He performed in 1952 with Pearl Bailey at the Paramount Theatre in New York.

== Final years ==
Baer's last years were spent battling ailments that included diabetes, hypertension, and Alzheimer's disease. After a transfer from Sutter Memorial Hospital, he was admitted to the Martinez Veterans Hospital one week before his death and died on July 18, 1986, in Martinez, California. He was survived by his wife Vicki Farrell Brumbelow—whom he had married in 1964—a daughter Sheila, and three grandchildren. Baer had three previous marriages. His body is buried in East Lawn Sierra Hills Memorial Park in Sacramento. Both Buddy and his brother Max were known as the "professional good guys" or "the genial giants". After their deaths, Sacramento sports reporter Billy Conlin wrote, "When they died, the 'sweet science' lost two of the sweetest!"

== Partial filmography ==
- Take It from Me (1937) - Kid Brody
- Africa Screams (1949) - Boots Wilson
- Quo Vadis (1951) - Ursus, Lygia's bodyguard
- Two Tickets to Broadway (1951) - Sailor on Bus
- Flame of Araby (1951) - Hakim Barbarossa
- Jack and the Beanstalk (1952) - Sgt. Riley / The Giant
- The Big Sky (1952) - Romaine
- Fair Wind to Java (1953) - King
- Dream Wife (1953) - Vizier
- The Marshal's Daughter (1953) - Buddy Baer - Poker Game Player
- Jubilee Trail (1954) - Nicolai Gregorovitch Karakozeff 'Handsome Brute'
- Slightly Scarlet (1956) - Lenhardt
- Hell Canyon Outlaws (1957) - Henchman Stan
- Giant from the Unknown (1958) - Vargas the Giant
- Once Upon a Horse... (1958) - Beulah's Brother
- Snow White and the Three Stooges (1961) - Hordred
- The Magic Fountain (1961) - Big Benjamin (voice)
- The Bashful Elephant (1962) - Tavern Owner
- Ride Beyond Vengeance (1966) - Mr. Kratz (final film role)

== Television ==
In 1957, Baer appeared in an episode of television's Gunsmoke, the episode entitled, "Never Pester Chester". In 1958, Baer appeared in an episode of the syndicated Adventures of Superman TV series, playing the role of Atlas, a circus strongman, who is duped by his fellow circus performers into stealing for them. They tell him that Superman is a crook and that he can help right the Man of Steel's wrongs by doing so.

In 1958, Baer appeared in Season 1 Episode 33 of Wagon Train, “The Daniel Hogan Story”. He played a boxer nicknamed “The Tinsmith”.

Baer's other television credits included guest roles on The Abbott and Costello Show, Adventures of Superman, Captain Midnight, Cheyenne, Circus Boy, Climax!, Have Gun – Will Travel, Peter Gunn, Rawhide, Sky King, Wagon Train, Tales of the Vikings, Toast of the Town, and in the adventure series Sheena, Queen of the Jungle. Baer’s most memorable character role was, perhaps, Stobo, on the aforementioned episode of Gunsmoke.
