= Bert Dorr =

American baseball player (1862–1914)

- Pitcher
- Born: February 2, 1862; New York, New York, U.S.
- Died: June 16, 1914 (aged 52); Dickinson, New York, U.S.
- Batted: Unknown Threw: Unknown

MLB debut
- August 24, 1882, for the St. Louis Brown Stockings

Last MLB appearance
- October 1, 1882, for the St. Louis Brown Stockings

MLB statistics
- Games pitched: 8
- Win–loss record: 2–6
- Earned run average: 2.59
- Stats at Baseball Reference

Teams
- St. Louis Brown Stockings (1882)

Charles Albert "Bert" Dorr (February 2, 1862 – June 16, 1914) was an American Major League Baseball pitcher from New York City who played a total of eight games for the 1882 St. Louis Brown Stockings. He started and completed all eight games he appeared in, finishing with a record of 2–6 and had a 2.59 ERA.

Dorr died at the age of 52 in Dickinson, New York, and is interred at Glenwood Cemetery.
