= Tom Mansell =

American baseball player (1855–1934)

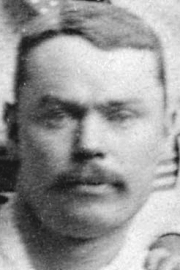
- Outfielder
- Born: January 1, 1855; Auburn, New York, U.S.
- Died: October 6, 1934 (aged 79); Auburn, New York, U.S.
- Batted: Left Threw: Right

MLB debut
- May 1, 1879, for the Troy Trojans

Last MLB appearance
- October 15, 1884, for the Columbus Buckeyes

MLB statistics
- Batting average: .259
- Home runs: 0
- Runs batted in: 74
- Stats at Baseball Reference

Teams
- Troy Trojans (1879); Syracuse Stars (1879); Detroit Wolverines (1883); St. Louis Browns (1883); Cincinnati Red Stockings (1884); Columbus Buckeyes (1884)

Thomas Edward Mansell (January 1, 1855 – October 6, 1934) was a 19th-century American professional baseball player. Mansell played outfield for parts of three seasons in Major League Baseball: 1879, 1883, and 1884. He played a total of eleven seasons professionally, from 1877 until 1887. His brothers John and Mike also played baseball professionally.
