= Abe Simon =

American boxer (1913–1969)

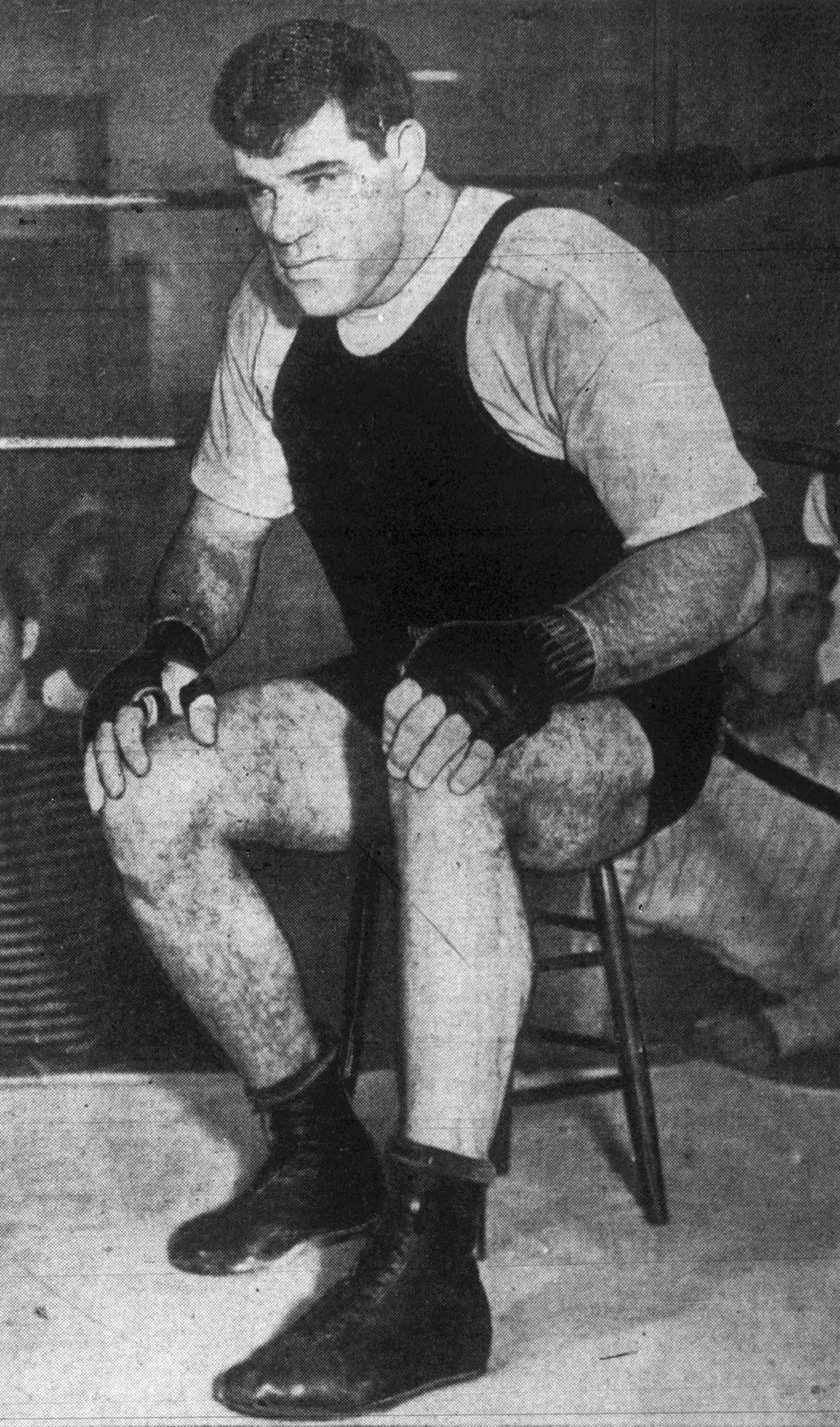
- Simon, circa 1941

Personal information
- Nickname: The Ape
- Born: Abraham Simon; May 30, 1913 New York City, US
- Died: October 24, 1969 (aged 56) Long Island, New York, US
- Height: 6 ft 4 in (1.93 m)
- Weight: Heavyweight

Boxing career
- Reach: 82 in (208 cm)
- Stance: Orthodox

Boxing record
- Total fights: 47
- Wins: 36
- Win by KO: 25
- Losses: 10
- Draws: 1
- No contests: 0

Abraham Simon (May 30, 1913 – October 24, 1969) was an American professional heavyweight boxer. He fought Joe Louis for the world heavyweight title twice. He was managed for most of his career by Jimmy Johnston, and trained by Freddie Brown. In 1940, he was rated the sixth best heavyweight in the world, and would rise higher in the next two years. After retiring, he became an actor and had roles in two of America's best-known movies about boxers, Academy Award winner On the Waterfront and Requiem for a Heavyweight.

== Early life ==
Simon was born to Jewish parents Max and Rose in the Richmond Hill neighborhood in New York City on May 30, 1913, and attended John Adams High School. He was a star lineman on his high school football team and was an interscholastic shot-put champion before taking up boxing. During a High School football game, several boxing promoters in the crowd noticed his strength and told him if he pursued boxing, he could have a lucrative career and they could arrange for him to be trained by the legendary trainer and cut man Freddie Brown. Brown trained many of boxing's greatest including Italian champions Rocky Marciano and Rocky Graziano, and later Larry Holmes and Roberto Duran. While pursuing his boxing career in his 20s he worked as a police patrolman in Long Beach, New York.

== Professional boxing career ==
=== Early career ===
Making a stir in his professional debut in March, 1935, at the age of 21, he knocked out Jim Dowling at the Jamaica Arena in Queens, New York. According to most sources, in an impressive display, he won his next thirteen fights, and nearly all by knockout. His two most notable early career losses against well known adversaries came against Lou Nova in 1936 in a six-round points decision and the six-foot-six Buddy Baer, brother of Max, who knocked him out in three rounds in 1937.

In a rare loss on January 22, 1940, he dropped a decision to Willie Reddish in a well-attended match in Philadelphia. Simon was down twice in the match, and Reddish was given eight of the ten rounds. Reddish peppered Simon's body and jaw with left hooks and right swings, and won an easy decision. In the prior month on December 6, 1939, Simon had defeated Reddish in a fourth-round TKO in Philadelphia. As was not uncommon in Simon's matches, he had a sizable weight advantage over his opponent, in this instance a remarkable fifty-six pounds. The match took a turn for the worse in the fourth when the two boxers' heads clashed, and Reddish received a bad gash on his forehead, leading to the referee ending the fight from a technical knockout in the fourth.

=== Knockout of Jersey Joe Walcott ===
In one of his most memorable victories, in a ramp up to the heavyweight title, he knocked out the legendary Jersey Joe Walcott, a future heavyweight champion, in six rounds in Newark, New Jersey, on February 12, 1940. A heavyweight in every sense, he benefitted from a remarkable sixty-two pound weight advantage in the match. Behind in points in the first five rounds, Simon unleashed a tremendous right to the mouth of Walcott 2:32 into the sixth causing the knockout, and Walcott barely moved as he was counted out by the referee.

In a well-attended match against a known opponent, Simon defeated Eddie Blunt in a ten-round points decision at the Meadowbrook Bowl in Newark, New Jersey on May 20, 1940. The last three rounds were fought in a heavy rain in the outdoor arena. Simon outweighed Blunt by 28 pounds, and persevered to pull off the win with a points victory.

In one of his best known victories against a highly rated adversary, he defeated Roscoe Toles on December 6, 1940, in a ten-round unanimous decision before 5000 at Detroit's Olympia Stadium. After the fight, boxing promoter Mike Jacobs announced his intention to match Simon with Louis for the heavyweight championship. Simon performed better fighting in close, and was unaffected by a few punches to the jaw. There were no knockdowns in the match. Though Simon was the clear winner, the Detroit Free Press wrote that Toles more than held up his end of the fight looking far better in the fourth, and that only in the final rounds did Simon, showing greater endurance, take the fight to Toles. He also had a heavily publicized win over Finland's Gunnar Barlund on October 7, 1940, in a ten-round points decision at New York's St. Nicholas Arena. Barlund was soundly defeated suffering a cut eye and chin early in the match, and winning no more than two of the ten rounds.

=== World heavyweight contender ===
In his first attempt at the world heavyweight championship, on March 21, 1941, he lost to reigning heavyweight champion Joe Louis before a record crowd of 19,000 at Detroit's Olympia Stadium in a 13th-round technical knockout. He was assisted in training for that match by the first African-American World Heavyweight Champion, Jack Johnson. In the most valiant effort of his career against his greatest adversary, many ringside experts gave Simon the second, fourth, sixth, tenth, and eleventh rounds. According to one source, when Simon knocked Louis down in the first round, it was the first knockdown of his professional career. Simon even managed to stagger Louis briefly in the seventh. Though he was down repeatedly in the thirteenth before the referee called the fight, his ability to withstand the blows of Louis and win four rounds placed him as a serious heavyweight contender in his mid-career. After the fight, Louis told reporters, "for a big guy, he was pretty good and just about as tough as they come".

He lost to Louis again in his second and final attempt at the heavyweight title, at the coveted venue of Madison Square Garden on March 27, 1942, in a sixth-round technical knockout. He was down at the bell in both the second and fifth rounds. Before 18,000 fans, Simon fought through a bruising attack by Louis, lumbering into the fourth round and connecting with a few blows, before succumbing to a brutal attack in the opening of the sixth. Louis was fighting for the Army for the first time, and though he was fitter than in his first match with Simon, he was hoping for a quick knockout to avoid injury as he received no purse for the fight. The match was a benefit for the Army Relief Fund, which helped both boxer's reputations and garnered a larger audience, including many servicemen.

== Film and television ==
Between 1940 and 1962, Simon acted in small roles in several TV series and had parts in four movies.

Year	Title	Role	Notes
1940	The Notorious Elinor Lee	Hererra	Black director Filmed in the Bronx
1942	World Heavyweight Champion Fight:Joe Louis vs. Abe Simon	newsreel highlights	
1951	The Colgate Comedy Hour	Played self, pro-boxer	Episode 2.1
1952	Charlie Wild, Private Detective	The Dancer	TV Episode "The Case of the Barber's Daughter"
1952	Man Against Crime	Sammy	One TV episode in series "Get Out of Town"
1954	On the Waterfront	Barney	8 Academy Awards
1956	Singing in the Dark	The Killer	First Hollywood feature addressing the Holocaust
1956-7	United States Steel Hour	Pinaud / Hercules	TV Drama Series; Two episodes
1958	Never Love a Stranger	'Fats' Crown	Crime Drama
1962	Requiem for a Heavyweight	Fighter in Bar	Boxing movie starring Anthony Quinn

== Careers after boxing and death ==
Continuing his career in law enforcement after his second loss to Louis, he was appointed Deputy Police Commissioner of Long Beach in 1942. From 1947 to 1956, he had a successful part-time career as a boxing referee in the New York area. For most of his adult life he lived on 215th Street in Long Island's Bayside Hills, in Queens, New York. He began working as a detective at Roosevelt Raceway in 1957, and after suffering from arthritis, switched to Public Relations around 1966.

He died on October 24, 1969, at Meadowbrook Hospital in East Meadow, Long Island, leaving a wife, Rita, whom he had married in 1942, and two children. A week before his death, he had been working in his Public Relations job for the Roosevelt Raceway, when he suffered a serious heart attack.

== Selected bouts ==
6 Wins,5 Losses,1 Draw
Result	Opponent	Date	Location	Result/Duration	Notes
Win	Jim Dowling	Mar 11, 1935	Jamaica, Queens	2nd Rnd. KO	Boxing debut
Loss	Lou Nova	Oct 21, 1936	New York, New York	6 Rnds Points	Rare early loss
Loss	Buddy Baer	Aug 30, 1937	Yankee Stad., Bronx	3rd Rnd TKO	Rare early loss
Win	Willie Reddish	Dec 6, 1939	Philadelphia	4 Rnd TKO	Reddish had gash on his forehead
Loss	Willie Reddish	Jan 22, 1940	Philadelphia	10 Rnds Points	Simon floored twice
Win	Jersey Joe Walcott	Feb 12, 1940	Laurel Garden, Newark, NJ	6th Rnd KO	Walcott, future heavywt. champ
Win	Eddie Blunt	May 20, 1940	Newark, New Jersey	10 Rnd Points	Fought in the rain
Win	Roscoe Toles	Dec 6, 1940	Detroit, MI	10 Rnds	Unanimous Dec.
Win	Gunnar Barlund	Oct. 7, 1940	New York, New York	10 Rnd Points Dec.	At St. Nicholas Arena
Loss	Joe Louis	Mar 21, 1941	Detroit, Michigan	13th Rnd TKO	Heavyweight title match*
*Draw*	Turkey Thompson	Oct 6, 1941	Los Angeles, CA	10 Rnd Points	Well-publicized match
Loss	Joe Louis	Mar 27, 1942	Mad. Sq. Garden, NY	6th Rnd TKO	Heavyweight title match* 19,000 fans
