= John Schappert =

American baseball player (1853–1917)

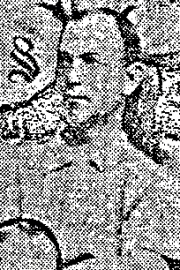
- Pitcher
- Born: November 1853; Brooklyn, New York, U.S.
- Died: July 27, 1917 (aged 63); Brooklyn, New York, U.S.
- Batted: Right Threw: Right

MLB debut
- May 3, 1882, for the St. Louis Brown Stockings

Last MLB appearance
- July 4, 1882, for the St. Louis Brown Stockings

MLB statistics
- Win–loss record: 8–7
- Earned run average: 3.52
- Games pitched: 15
- Stats at Baseball Reference

Teams
- St. Louis Brown Stockings (1882)

John Schappert (November 1853 – July 27, 1917 in Brooklyn, New York) was a 19th-century American professional baseball pitcher. Schappert pitched for the St. Louis Brown Stockings during the 1882 season. He pitched in 15 games, including 14 starts, and finished with a record of 8 wins and 7 losses.
