= John Reccius =

American baseball player (1859–1930)

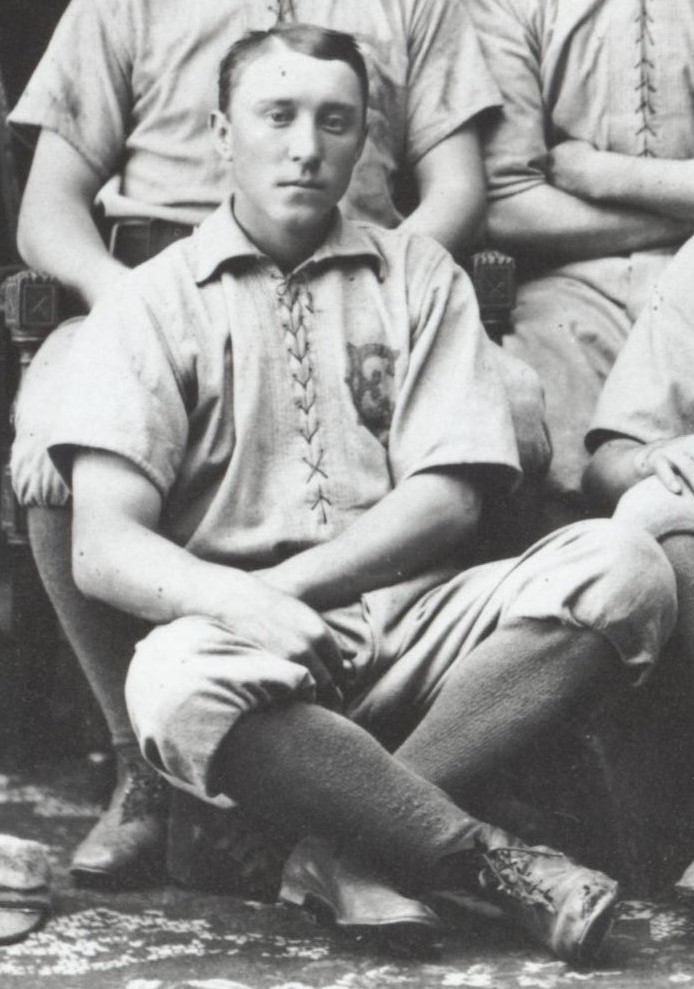
- Reccius in 1882
- Outfielder
- Born: October 29, 1859; Louisville, Kentucky, US
- Died: September 1, 1930 (aged 70); Louisville, Kentucky, US
- Batted: Unknown Threw: Unknown

MLB debut
- May 2, 1882, for the Louisville Eclipse

Last MLB appearance
- July 11, 1883, for the Louisville Eclipse

MLB statistics
- Batting average: .219
- Home runs: 1
- Runs scored: 56
- Stats at Baseball Reference

Teams
- Louisville Eclipse (1882–1883)

John Reccius (October 29, 1859 – September 1, 1930) was an American outfielder in Major League Baseball. Born in Louisville, Kentucky, he played for the Louisville Eclipse of the American Association in 1882 and 1883.

Reccius had two brothers who were also involved in baseball. Phil Reccius was a major league player for eight seasons, mostly with Louisville, and Bill Reccius was the founder and manager for the mid-1870s version of the Louisville Eclipse, though he did not manage or play when the team was in the majors. John and his brothers were childhood friends of Pete Browning and Jimmy Wolf, as well as others from the area who reached the major leagues.

Reccius died in Louisville, Kentucky, at the age of 70.
