= George Snyder (baseball) =

American baseball player (1848–1905)

- Pitcher
- Born: September 27, 1848; Philadelphia, Pennsylvania, U.S.
- Died: August 2, 1905 (aged 56); Philadelphia, Pennsylvania, U.S.
- Batted: Unknown Threw: Unknown

MLB debut
- September 30, 1882, for the Philadelphia Athletics

Last MLB appearance
- September 30, 1882, for the Philadelphia Athletics

MLB statistics
- Win–loss record: 1–0
- Earned run average: 0.00
- Strikeouts: 0
- Stats at Baseball Reference

Teams
- Philadelphia Athletics (1882)

George T. Snyder (September 27, 1848 – August 2, 1905) was an American Major League Baseball pitcher who played in 1882 with the Philadelphia Athletics.

Snyder died in his home town of Philadelphia, Pennsylvania in 1905 of angina pectoris.
