= Mike Mansell =

American baseball player (1858–1902)

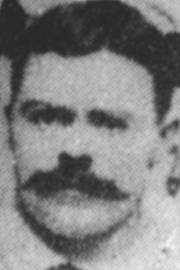
- Outfielder
- Born: January 15, 1858; Auburn, New York, U.S.
- Died: December 4, 1902 (aged 44); Auburn, New York, U.S.
- Batted: Left Threw: Unknown

MLB debut
- May 1, 1879, for the Syracuse Stars

Last MLB appearance
- October 15, 1884, for the Richmond Virginians

MLB statistics
- Batting average: .239
- Hits: 352
- Runs scored: 237
- Stats at Baseball Reference

Teams
- Syracuse Stars (1879); Cincinnati Stars (1880); Pittsburgh Alleghenys (1882–1884); Philadelphia Athletics (1884); Richmond Virginians (1884)

Michael R. Mansell (January 15, 1858 – December 4, 1902) was an American professional baseball outfielder in the Major Leagues from 1879 to 1884. He played for the Syracuse Stars, Cincinnati Stars, Pittsburgh Alleghenys, Philadelphia Athletics, and Richmond Virginians. His brothers John and Tom also played professional baseball.

== See also ==
- List of Major League Baseball annual doubles leaders
- List of Major League Baseball annual triples leaders
