= Jud Birchall =

American baseball player (1855–1887)

- Left fielder
- Born: September 12, 1855; Philadelphia, Pennsylvania, U.S.
- Died: December 22, 1887 (aged 32); Philadelphia, Pennsylvania, U.S.
- Batted: Unknown Threw: Unknown

MLB debut
- May 2, 1882, for the Philadelphia Athletics

Last MLB appearance
- October 10, 1884, for the Philadelphia Athletics

MLB statistics
- Batting average: .252
- Runs: 196
- Runs batted in: 51
- Stats at Baseball Reference

Teams
- Philadelphia Athletics (1882–1884)

Career highlights and awards
- Led the American Association in at bats in 1883.

Adoniram Judson "Jud" Birchall (September 12, 1855 – December 22, 1887) was an American Major League Baseball player who played left field for the Philadelphia Athletics in the American Association for three seasons from 1882 to 1884.

Birchall died at the age of 32 of a pulmonary ailment, and is interred at Milestown Baptist Church Cemetery in Philadelphia.
