= John Dyler =

American baseball player (1852–1916)

- Outfielder
- Born: June 5, 1852; Louisville, Kentucky, U.S.
- Died: August 15, 1916 (aged 64); Fort Myers, Florida, U.S.
- Batted: Unknown Threw: Unknown

MLB debut
- July 22, 1882, for the Louisville Eclipse

Last MLB appearance
- July 22, 1882, for the Louisville Eclipse

MLB statistics
- Batting average: .000
- Home runs: 0
- Runs batted in: 0
- Stats at Baseball Reference

Teams
- Louisville Eclipse (1882)

John F. Dyler (June 5, 1852 – August 16, 1916) was an American professional baseball player who played outfield in the Major Leagues for the 1882 Louisville Eclipse.
