= Bob Hogan (baseball) =

American baseball player (1860–1932)

- Pitcher
- Born: April 6, 1860; St. Louis, Missouri
- Died: January 22, 1932 (aged 71); Yucaipa, California
- Batted: Right Threw: Unknown

MLB debut
- July 5, 1882, for the St. Louis Brown Stockings

Last MLB appearance
- July 5, 1882, for the St. Louis Brown Stockings

MLB statistics
- Win–loss record: 0–1
- Earned run average: 1.13
- Strikeouts: 4
- Stats at Baseball Reference

Teams
- St. Louis Brown Stockings (1882)

Robert Edward Hogan (April 6, 1860 – January 22, 1932) was an American professional baseball pitcher. He played one game in Major League Baseball for the St. Louis Brown Stockings in 1882. He pitched a complete game in a loss, allowing seven runs, one of which was earned.
