= Chappy Lane =

American baseball player

- First baseman
- Born: Unknown; Pittsburgh, Pennsylvania, U.S.
- Died: October 9, 1901; Philadelphia, Pennsylvania, U.S.
- Batted: Right Threw: Unknown

MLB debut
- May 16, 1882, for the Pittsburgh Alleghenys

Last MLB appearance
- September 9, 1884, for the Toledo Blue Stockings

MLB statistics
- Batting average: .203
- Hits: 87
- Runs scored: 52
- Stats at Baseball Reference

Teams
- Pittsburgh Alleghenys (1882); Toledo Blue Stockings (1884)

George M. Lane (died October 9, 1901) was an American professional baseball player in the Major Leagues. His debut in the major leagues was on May 16, 1882. He finished his baseball career on September 9, 1884. He was a first baseman and outfielder for the 1882 Pittsburgh Alleghenys of the American Association and the 1884 Toledo Blue Stockings of the Union Association. Lane died on October 9, 1901, in Philadelphia.
