= John Mansell =

American baseball player (1859–1925)

- Outfielder
- Born: 1859; Auburn, New York, U.S.
- Died: February 20, 1925 (aged 65–66); Romulus, New York, U.S.
- Batted: Left Threw: Unknown

MLB debut
- May 9, 1882, for the Philadelphia Athletics

Last MLB appearance
- July 22, 1882, for the Philadelphia Athletics

MLB statistics
- Batting average: .238
- Home runs: 0
- Runs batted in: 17
- Stats at Baseball Reference

Teams
- Philadelphia Athletics (1882)

John Mansell (1859 – February 20, 1925) was a 19th-century American Major League Baseball player. He played outfield for the 1882 Philadelphia Athletics in the American Association. His brothers Mike and Tom also played professional baseball.
