= Phil Reccius =

American baseball player (1862–1903)

- Third baseman
- Born: June 7, 1862; Louisville, Kentucky, U.S.
- Died: February 15, 1903 (aged 40); Louisville, Kentucky, U.S.
- Batted: Unknown Threw: Unknown

MLB debut
- September 25, 1882, for the Louisville Eclipse

Last MLB appearance
- June 5, 1890, for the Rochester Broncos

MLB statistics
- Batting average: .231
- Runs scored: 117
- RBIs: 99
- Stats at Baseball Reference

Teams
- Louisville Eclipse/Colonels (1882–1887), (1888); Cleveland Blues (AA) (1887); Rochester Broncos (1890)

Phillip Reccius (June 7, 1862 – February 15, 1903) was an American Major League Baseball player from Louisville, Kentucky, who played for eight seasons in the majors, mainly playing third base for his hometown team, the Louisville Eclipse.

Phil had two brothers who were also involved heavily in baseball. John Reccius was a Major League player for two seasons, also for the Eclipse, and Bill Reccius was the founder and manager for the mid-1870s version of the Louisville Eclipse, though he did not manage or play in the majors. Phil and his brothers were childhood friends of other ballplayers who came from Louisville area, such as Pete Browning, and Jimmy Wolf.

Phil died at the age of 40 in Louisville, and is interred at Cave Hill Cemetery.
