= Tug Thompson =

Canadian baseball player (1856–1938)

- Catcher/Outfielder
- Born: September 5, 1856; London, Canada West
- Died: August 1, 1938 (aged 81); Guelph, Ontario, Canada
- Batted: Right Threw: Right

MLB debut
- August 31, 1882, for the Cincinnati Red Stockings

Last MLB appearance
- July 4, 1884, for the Indianapolis Hoosiers

MLB statistics
- Batting average: .206
- Home runs: 0
- Hits: 21
- Stats at Baseball Reference

Teams
- Cincinnati Red Stockings (1882); Indianapolis Hoosiers (1884)

John Parkinson Thompson (September 5, 1856 – August 1, 1938) was a Major League Baseball player. He played for the 1882 Cincinnati Red Stockings and the 1884 Indianapolis Hoosiers in the American Association
