= Jake Seymour =

American baseball player (1854–1897)

- Pitcher
- Born: c. 1854; Pittsburgh, Pennsylvania, U.S.
- Died: August 1, 1897 (aged 42–43); Allegheny, Pennsylvania, U.S.
- Batted: Unknown Threw: Unknown

MLB debut
- September 23, 1882, for the Pittsburgh Alleghenys

Last MLB appearance
- September 23, 1882, for the Pittsburgh Alleghenys

MLB statistics
- Win–loss record: 0-1
- Earned run average: 7.88
- Games pitched: 1
- Stats at Baseball Reference

Teams
- Pittsburgh Alleghenys (1882)

Jacob Semer (1854 – August 1, 1897), better known by the anglicized name "Jake Seymour" on the baseball field, was an American professional baseball player, who played in 1882 with the Pittsburgh Alleghenys of the American Association.

== Biography ==
Born circa 1854 to German immigrant parents, he lived in what was then known as Allegheny City, in the Deutschtown district, before the area was annexed by the city of Pittsburgh in 1907. As a teenager, he did not attend school, but, instead, helped to provide for his family by selling novelty jokes. He also later worked as a laborer.

During the 1870s and 1880s, he was widely regarded as one of the area's strongest pitchers. It is reported that "he pitched for various local top-notched teams in the old days, but he did his best work for the Bon Tons." On September 23, 1882, the Pittsburgh Alleghenys, then belonging to the American Association, gave Seymour a trial in what was to be his only major league game. He lived blocks from the original Exposition Park and played its last game there, before it was torn down after only one season due to a fire and flooding from the nearby Allegheny River. He was brought in to pitch the final championship game against the Louisville Eclipse in the last day of the season, pitching eight innings and giving up seven earned runs, with the Louisvilles winning the game 13–3. However, Seymour was undeterred. The game against Louisville was played in the morning, and in the afternoon, he went to Sewickley to pitch a game for the local club there.

Following his baseball years, he worked as a bartender and served on both the local police force and fire department (as a Horseman with Engine Co. 1).

== Death ==
On August 1, 1897, he died at 43 years of age from Bright's Disease. The staff of the Pittsburgh Post ran an obituary praising his contributions to local baseball and stating that his death would be deeply regretted by all who knew him. They also called him "one of the best bartenders in Allegheny [City]."

He left behind a wife, Mary (née Dooney), and three young daughters—Anna, Isla, and Catherine—who continued to use his baseball name "Seymour" as their own. After his death, they supported themselves by running a small grocery store in Deutschtown.
