= John Doyle (baseball) =

American baseball player (1858–1915)

- Pitcher
- Born: January 1, 1858; Halifax, Nova Scotia, Canada
- Died: December 24, 1915 (aged 56-57); Providence, Rhode Island, U.S.
- Threw: Right

MLB debut
- July 26, 1882, for the St. Louis Brown Stockings

Last MLB appearance
- August 5, 1882, for the St. Louis Brown Stockings

MLB statistics
- Win–loss record: 0–3
- Earned run average: 2.62
- Strikeouts: 5
- Stats at Baseball Reference

Teams
- St. Louis Brown Stockings (1882)

John Aloysius Doyle (January 1, 1858 – December 24, 1915) was a Canadian Major League Baseball pitcher. Doyle pitched in 3 games for the St. Louis Brown Stockings in 1882 and recorded a loss in all 3.
