= Frank Decker (baseball) =

American baseball player (1856–1940)

- Utility player
- Born: February 26, 1856; St. Louis, Missouri
- Died: February 5, 1940 (aged 83); St. Louis, Missouri
- Batted: Right Threw: Right

MLB debut
- June 25, 1879, for the Syracuse Stars

Last MLB appearance
- August 24, 1882, for the St. Louis Brown Stockings

MLB statistics
- Batting average: .167
- Home runs: 0
- Runs batted in: 1
- Stats at Baseball Reference

Teams
- Syracuse Stars (1879); St. Louis Brown Stockings (1882)

Frank Decker (February 26, 1856 in St. Louis, Missouri – February 5, 1940 in St. Louis) was a 19th-century professional baseball player. Decker played in 3 games for the Syracuse Stars in 1879 and 2 games for the St. Louis Brown Stockings in 1882.
