= Ed Brown (baseball) =

American baseball player

- Third baseman
- Born: Chicago, Illinois, U.S.
- Batted: Unknown Threw: Right

MLB debut
- August 19, 1882, for the St. Louis Brown Stockings

Last MLB appearance
- June 30, 1884, for the Toledo Blue Stockings

MLB statistics
- Batting average: .178
- Home runs: 0
- Runs batted in: 0
- Stats at Baseball Reference

Teams
- St. Louis Brown Stockings (1882); Toledo Blue Stockings (1884)

Edward P. Brown was a 19th-century American professional baseball player. Brown played primarily third base and outfield for the St. Louis Brown Stockings in 1882 and the Toledo Blue Stockings in 1884.
