= Bob Blakiston =

American baseball player (1855–1918)

- Outfielder
- Born: October 2, 1855; San Francisco, California, U.S.
- Died: December 25, 1918 (aged 63); San Francisco, California, U.S.

MLB debut
- May 2, 1882, for the Philadelphia Athletics

Last MLB appearance
- October 15, 1884, for the Indianapolis Hoosiers

MLB statistics
- Batting average: .239
- Home runs: 0
- Runs scored: 87
- Stats at Baseball Reference

Teams
- Philadelphia Athletics (1882–84); Indianapolis Hoosiers (1884)

Robert J. Blakiston (October 2, 1855 – December 25, 1918), was an American Major League Baseball outfielder. He played three seasons in the majors, from 1882-1884, for the Philadelphia Athletics and Indianapolis Hoosiers.
