= Bill Farrell (baseball) =

American baseball player

- Catcher/Shortstop/Outfielder
- Born: Bridgeport, Connecticut, U.S.
- Batted: Unknown Threw: Unknown

MLB debut
- May 3, 1882, for the Philadelphia Athletics

Last MLB appearance
- May 21, 1883, for the Baltimore Orioles

MLB statistics
- Batting average: .143
- Home runs: 0
- Runs batted in: 1
- Stats at Baseball Reference

Teams
- Philadelphia Athletics (1882); Baltimore Orioles (1883)

William Farrell was a 19th-century American Major League Baseball player. He played for the 1882 Philadelphia Athletics and 1883 Baltimore Orioles in the American Association.
