= Ren Wylie =

American baseball player (1861–1951)

- Center fielder
- Born: December 14, 1861; Elizabeth, Pennsylvania
- Died: August 17, 1951 (aged 89); Wilkinsburg, Pennsylvania
- Batted: Right Threw: Right

MLB debut
- August 11, 1882, for the Pittsburgh Alleghenys

Last MLB appearance
- August 11, 1882, for the Pittsburgh Alleghenys

MLB statistics
- Batting average: .000
- Games played: 1
- At bats: 3
- Stats at Baseball Reference

Teams
- Pittsburgh Alleghenys (1882)

James Renwick Wylie (1861–1951) was an American professional baseball player. He played one game in Major League Baseball, August 11 as a center fielder for the 1882 Pittsburgh Alleghenys. He was hitless in three at bats. He had played college baseball at Geneva College. He was also a member of the Pennsylvania House of Representatives from 1915 to 1918 and is a member of the Beaver County Sports Hall of Fame
