= Harry Salisbury =

American baseball player (1855–1933)

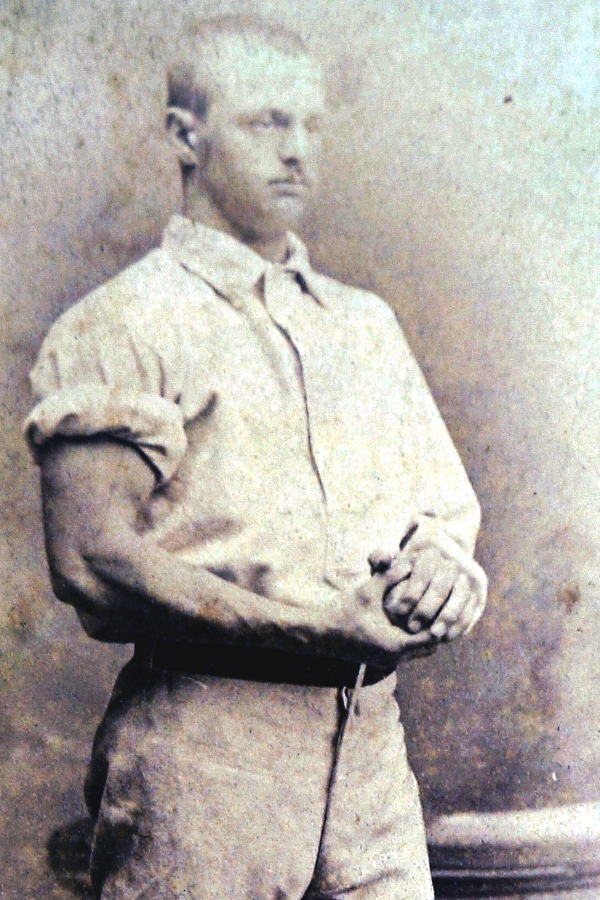
- Salisbury in 1877
- Pitcher
- Born: May 15, 1855; Providence, Rhode Island, U.S.
- Died: March 29, 1933 (aged 77); Chicago, Illinois, U.S.
- Batted: Left Threw: Unknown

MLB debut
- August 28, 1879, for the Troy Trojans

Last MLB appearance
- September 22, 1882, for the Pittsburgh Alleghenys

MLB statistics
- Win–loss record: 24–24
- Earned run average: 2.55
- Strikeouts: 166
- Stats at Baseball Reference

Teams
- Troy Trojans (1879); Pittsburgh Alleghenys (1882)

Henry Houston Salisbury (May 15, 1855 – March 29, 1933) was an American pitcher in Major League Baseball.

Salisbury was born in Providence, Rhode Island, and attended Brown University. He played in MLB for two seasons. In 1879, he had a record of 4–6 for the Troy Trojans. In 1882, he went 20–18 for the Pittsburgh Alleghenys, completing all 38 of his starts. In that 1882 season, he finished in the top 10 in several league pitching categories, including wins, earned run average (2.63), and strikeouts (135).

Salisbury died in Chicago, Illinois, at the age of 77 and was buried in Mount Hope Cemetery.
