= Charles Strick =

American baseball player (1858–1933)

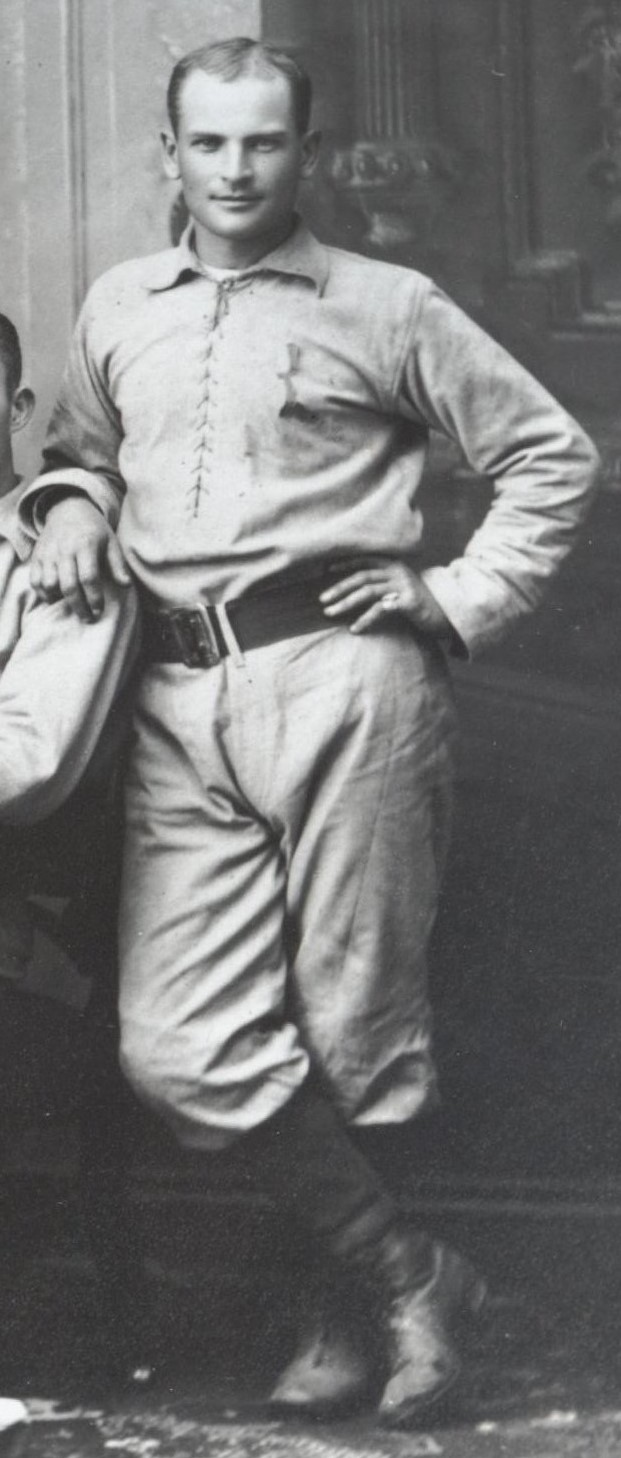
- Strick in 1882
- Catcher
- Born: September 15, 1858; Erie, Pennsylvania
- Died: November 18, 1933 (aged 75); Erie, Pennsylvania
- Batted: Unknown Threw: Unknown

MLB debut
- May 18, 1882, for the Louisville Eclipse

Last MLB appearance
- September 30, 1882, for the Louisville Eclipse

MLB statistics
- Batting average: .164
- Home runs: 0
- Runs scored: 17
- Stats at Baseball Reference

Teams
- Louisville Eclipse (1882)

Charles Ernest Strick (September 15, 1858 – November 18, 1933) was an American catcher in Major League Baseball. He played for the 1882 Louisville Eclipse.
