= Ed Halbriter =

American baseball player (1860–1936)

- Pitcher
- Born: February 2, 1860; Auburn, New York
- Died: August 9, 1936 (aged 76); Los Angeles, California
- Batted: Unknown Threw: Unknown

MLB debut
- May 23, 1882, for the Philadelphia Athletics

Last MLB appearance
- May 23, 1882, for the Philadelphia Athletics

MLB statistics
- Win–loss record: 0–1
- Earned run average: 7.88
- Strikeouts: 4
- Stats at Baseball Reference

Teams
- Philadelphia Athletics (1882)

Edward L. Halbriter (February 2, 1860 – August 9, 1936) was a Major League Baseball pitcher who played in 1882 with the Philadelphia Athletics.
