= Charlie Bohn =

American baseball player (1856–1903)

Charlie Brown
- Outfielder/Pitcher
- Born: October 1856; Cleveland, Ohio, U.S.
- Died: August 1, 1903 (aged 46); Cleveland, Ohio, U.S.
- Batted: Right Threw: Right

MLB debut
- June 20, 1882, for the Louisville Eclipse

Last MLB appearance
- July 15, 1882, for the Louisville Eclipse

MLB statistics
- Win–loss record: 1–1
- Earned run average: 3.00
- Strikeouts: 1
- Stats at Baseball Reference

Teams
- Louisville Eclipse (1882)

Charles Bohn (October, 1856 – August 1, 1903) was an American professional baseball player who played outfield and pitcher in the Major Leagues for the 1882 Louisville Eclipse.

He was buried at Woodland Cemetery in Cleveland, Ohio.
