= Harry Maskrey (baseball) =

American baseball player (1861–1930)

- Outfielder
- Born: December 21, 1861; Mercer, Pennsylvania
- Died: August 17, 1930 (aged 68); Mercer, Pennsylvania
- Batted: Unknown Threw: Unknown

MLB debut
- September 21, 1882, for the Louisville Eclipse

Last MLB appearance
- September 21, 1882, for the Louisville Eclipse

MLB statistics
- Batting average: .000
- Home runs: 0
- Runs batted in: 0
- Stats at Baseball Reference

Teams
- Louisville Eclipse (1882)

Harry H. Maskrey (December 21, 1861 – August 17, 1930), was a professional baseball player who played outfield in the Major Leagues for the 1882 Louisville Eclipse. He appeared in one game on September 21, 1882, and was hitless in four at-bats for the Eclipse. His brother, Leech Maskrey, also played for the 82 Eclipse.
