= Rudy Kemmler =

American baseball player (1860–1909)

- Catcher
- Born: 1860; Chicago, Illinois, U.S.
- Died: June 20, 1909; Chicago, Illinois, U.S.
- Batted: Right Threw: Right

MLB debut
- July 26, 1879, for the Providence Grays

Last MLB appearance
- August 11, 1889, for the Columbus Solons

MLB statistics
- Batting average: .195
- Home runs: 0
- Runs scored: 79
- Stats at Baseball Reference

Teams
- Providence Grays (1879); Cleveland Blues (NL) (1881); Cincinnati Red Stockings (AA) (1882); Pittsburgh Alleghenys (1882, 1885); Columbus Buckeyes (1883–84); St. Louis Browns (1882) (1886); Columbus Solons (1889)

Rudolph Kemmler, born Rudolph Kemler, (January 1860 – June 20, 1909) was an American Major League Baseball catcher for all or part of eight seasons. He played for seven different teams in the National League and American Association between 1879 and 1889.

Kemmler was a poor hitter but a good defensive catcher. In the days before catchers had protection against pitched balls, he was quite durable. He spent most of his career as a reserve player.

In 1883, Kemmler set a still-standing MLB record of most passed balls allowed in a season, with 114.Kemmler caught two no-hitters in 1884 for Columbus Buckeye pitchers Ed Morris and Frank Mountain.

Kemmler died in his hometown of Chicago, and is interred at Concordia Cemetery in Forest Park, Illinois.

== Sources ==
- Career statistics from Baseball Reference · Baseball Reference (Minors) · Retrosheet · Baseball Almanac
