= Morrie Critchley =

American baseball player (1850–1910)

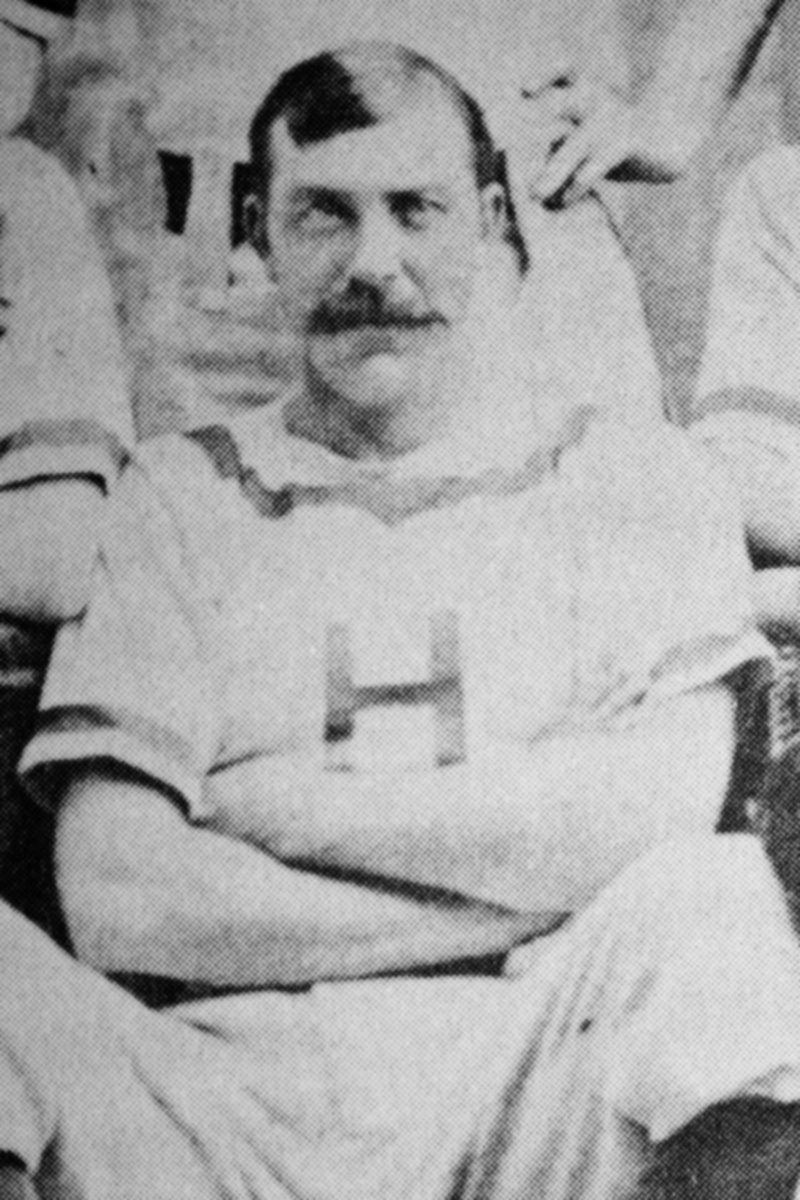
- Pitcher
- Born: March 26, 1850; New London, Connecticut, U.S.
- Died: March 6, 1910 (aged 59); Pittsburgh, Pennsylvania, U.S.
- Batted: Unknown Threw: Unknown

MLB debut
- May 8, 1882, for the Pittsburgh Alleghenys

Last MLB appearance
- July 21, 1882, for the St. Louis Brown Stockings

MLB statistics
- Win–loss record: 1-4
- Earned run average: 3.35
- Games pitched: 5
- Stats at Baseball Reference

Teams
- Pittsburgh Alleghenys (1882); St. Louis Brown Stockings (1882)

Morris Arthur "Morrie" Critchley (March 26, 1850 – March 6, 1910) was a 19th-century American professional baseball pitcher. He played one game for the Pittsburgh Alleghenys and four games for the St. Louis Brown Stockings in 1882. He pitched five complete games in five games started and finished his career 1–4 with a 3.35 ERA.

== Death ==
He died at age 59 from a heart disease in 1910.
