= History of baseball in the United States =

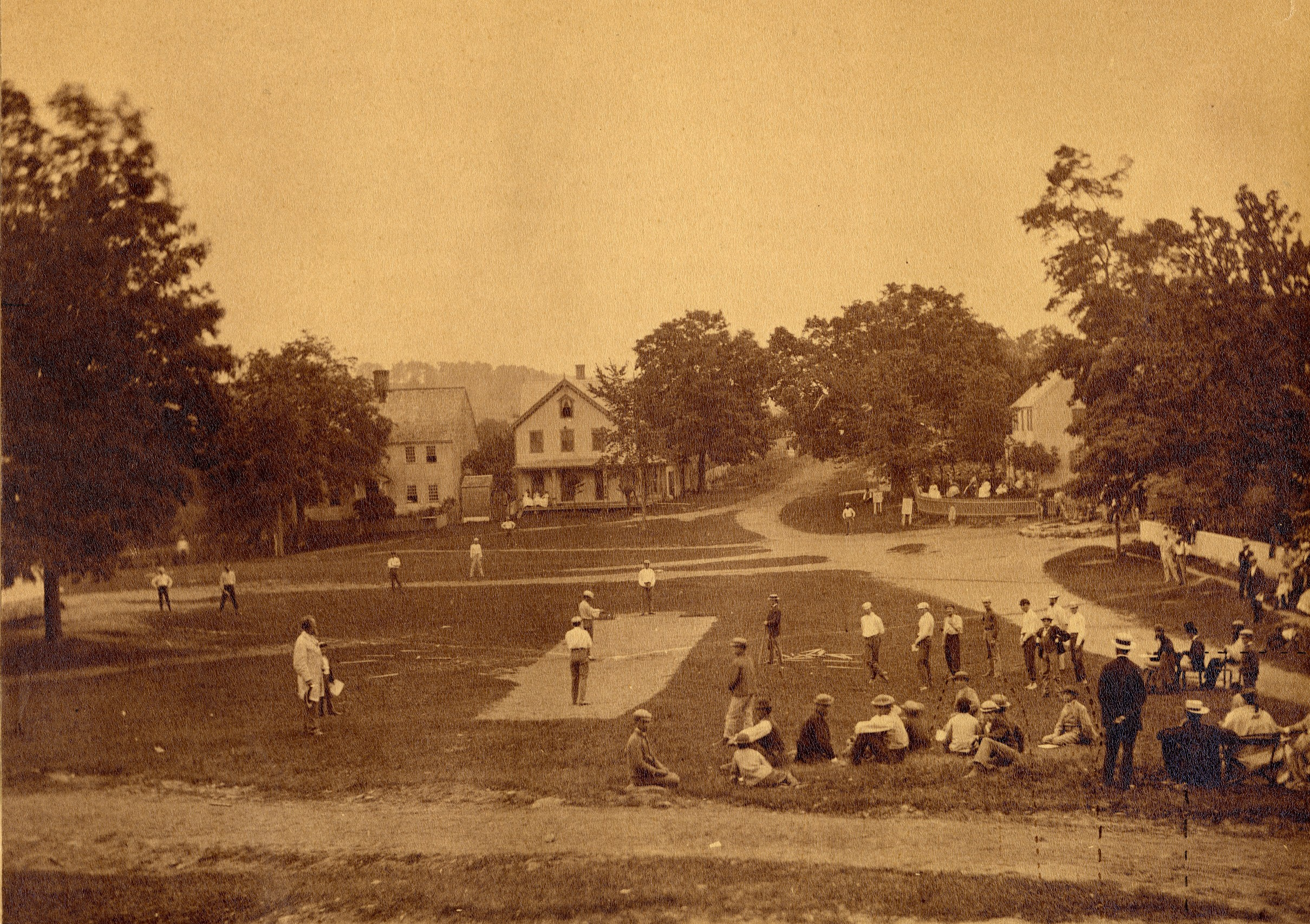
The earliest known photograph of a baseball game in progress, 1869

The history of baseball in the United States dates to the 19th century, when boys and amateur enthusiasts played a baseball-like game by their own informal rules using homemade equipment. The popularity of the sport grew and amateur men's ball clubs were formed in the 1830–1850s. Semi-professional baseball clubs followed in the 1860s, and the first professional leagues arrived in the post-American Civil War 1870s.

== Early history ==
The earliest known mention of baseball in the United States is either a 1786 diary entry by a Princeton University student who describes playing "baste ball," or a 1791 Pittsfield, Massachusetts, ordinance that barred the playing of baseball within 80 yards (73 m) of the town meeting house and its glass windows. Another early reference reports that base ball was regularly played on Saturdays in 1823 on the outskirts of New York City in an area that today is Greenwich Village. The Olympic Base Ball Club of Philadelphia was organized in 1833.

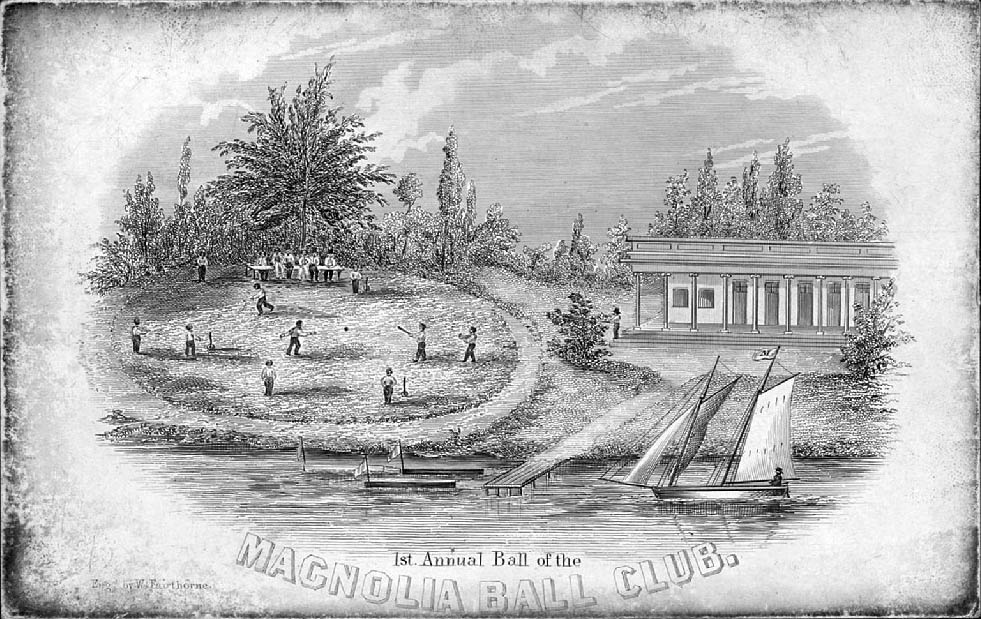
Invitation to the "1st Annual Ball of the Magnolia Ball Club" of New York, c. 1843, depicting the Colonnade Hotel at the Elysian Fields and a group of men playing baseball: the earliest known image of grown men playing the game.

In 1903, the British-born sportswriter Henry Chadwick published an article speculating that baseball was derived from an English game called rounders, which Chadwick had played as a boy in England. Baseball executive Albert Spalding disagreed, asserting that the game was fundamentally American and had hatched on American soil. To settle the matter, the two men appointed a commission, headed by Abraham Mills, the fourth president of the National League of Professional Baseball Clubs. The commission, which also included six other sports executives, labored for three years, finally declaring that Abner Doubleday had invented the national pastime. Doubleday "never knew that he had invented baseball. But 15 years after his death, he was anointed as the father of the game," writes baseball historian John Thorn. The myth about Doubleday inventing the game of baseball actually came from a Colorado mining engineer who claimed to have been present at the moment of creation. The miner's tale was never corroborated; nonetheless, the myth was born and persists to this day.

The first team to play baseball under modern rules is believed to be the New York Knickerbockers. The club was founded on September 23, 1845, as a breakaway from the earlier Gotham Club. The new club's by-laws committee, William R. Wheaton and William H. Tucker, formulated the Knickerbocker Rules, which, in large part, dealt with organizational matters but which also laid out some new rules of play. One of these prohibited soaking or plugging the runner; under older rules, a fielder could put a runner out by hitting the runner with the thrown ball, as in the common schoolyard game of kickball. The Knickerbocker Rules required fielders to tag or force the runner. The new rules also introduced base paths, foul lines and foul balls; in "town ball" every batted ball was fair, as in cricket, and the lack of runner's lanes led to wild chases around the infield. In the long run, these changes resulted in the focus of baseball being more about the duel between batting and pitching rather than baserunning and fielding.

Initially, Wheaton and Tucker's innovations did not serve the Knickerbockers well. In the first known competitive game between two clubs under the new rules, played at Elysian Fields in Hoboken, New Jersey, on June 19, 1846, the "New York nine" (almost certainly the Gotham Club) humbled the Knickerbockers by a score of 23 to 1. Nevertheless, the Knickerbocker Rules were rapidly adopted by teams in the New York area and their version of baseball became known as the "New York Game" (as opposed to the less rule-bound "Massachusetts Game," played by clubs in New England, and "Philadelphia Town-ball").

In spite of baseball rapid growth in popularity, cricket still remained the more popular game. Even in the mid-1850s, the New York press was still devoting more coverage to cricket than baseball. But the English sport was waning due to Americans starting to find the fast-paced nature of baseball more appealing than the technical slower game of cricket; first-class cricket was also played over a much longer duration than baseball. As baseball's popularity grew, it began to poach players and administrators from cricket. The demise of cricket was also due in part to the American Civil War. Baseball was a game that could be easily played by troops with little effort, any clear patch of ground would do while cricket required a carefully prepared pitch and outfield. During the Reconstruction era following the Civil War, American cricket fans accepted their game no longer had any broad appeal. Baseball had developed into the "people's game" while cricket became an amateur game for gentlemen.

At an 1857 convention of sixteen New York area clubs, including the Knickerbockers, the National Association of Base Ball Players (NABBP) was formed. It was the first official organization to govern the sport and the first to establish a championship. The convention also formalized three key features of the game: 90 feet distance between the bases, 9-man teams, and 9-inning games (under the Knickerbocker Rules, games were played to 21 runs). During the Civil War, soldiers from different parts of the United States played baseball together, leading to a more unified national version of the sport. Membership in the NABBP grew to almost 100 clubs by 1865 and to over 400 by 1867, including clubs from as far away as California. Beginning in 1869, the league permitted professional play, addressing a growing practice that had not been previously permitted under its rules. The first and most prominent professional club of the NABBP era was the Cincinnati Red Stockings in Ohio, which went undefeated in 1869 and half of 1870. After the Cincy club broke up at the end of that season, four key members including player/manager Harry Wright moved to Boston under owner and businessman Ivers Whitney Adams and became the "Boston Red Stockings" and the Boston Base Ball Club.

"Take Me Out to The Ballgame"

In 1858, at the Fashion Race Course in the Corona neighborhood of Queens (now part of New York City), the first games of baseball to charge admission were played. The All Stars of Brooklyn, including players from the Atlantic, Excelsior, Putnam and Eckford clubs, took on the All Stars of New York (Manhattan), including players from the Knickerbocker, Gotham, Eagle and Empire clubs. These are commonly believed to the first all-star baseball games.

== Growth ==
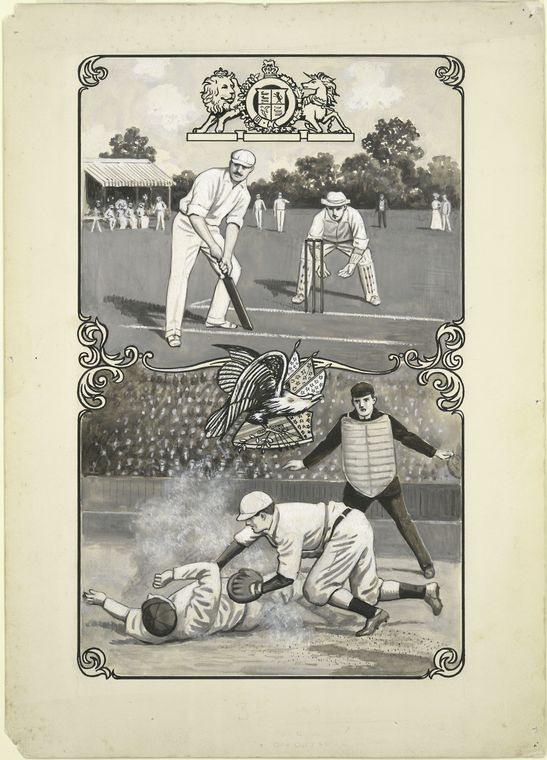
Baseball compared to Test cricket

Before the Civil War, baseball competed for public interest with cricket and regional variants of baseball, notably town ball played in Philadelphia and the Massachusetts Game played in New England. In the 1860s, aided by the Civil War, "New York" style baseball expanded into a national game. Baseball began to overtake cricket in popularity, impelled by its much shorter duration relative to the contemporary form of cricket. Several other factors reduced North Americans' cultural loyalty to cricket, as Puritan anti-recreational attitudes and centuries of separation had eroded ties to English sporting culture. William Humber argues there was also less of a social taboo around baseball in the New World than in England, where it was strongly perceived as a children's game, and that Americans preferred a sport where the teams alternated offense and defense more frequently.

As its first governing body, the National Association of Base Ball Players was formed. The NABBP soon expanded into a truly national organization, although most of the strongest clubs remained those based in the country's northeastern part. In its 12-year history as an amateur league, the Atlantic Club of Brooklyn won seven championships, establishing themselves as the first true dynasty in the sport. However, Mutual of New York was widely considered one of the best teams of the era. By the end of 1865, almost 100 clubs were members of the NABBP. By 1867, it ballooned to over 400 members, including some clubs from as far away as California. One of these western clubs, Chicago (dubbed the "White Stockings" by the press for their uniform hosiery), won the championship in 1870. Because of this growth, regional and state organizations began to assume a more prominent role in the governance of the amateur sport at the expense of the NABBP. At the same time, the professionals soon sought a new governing body.

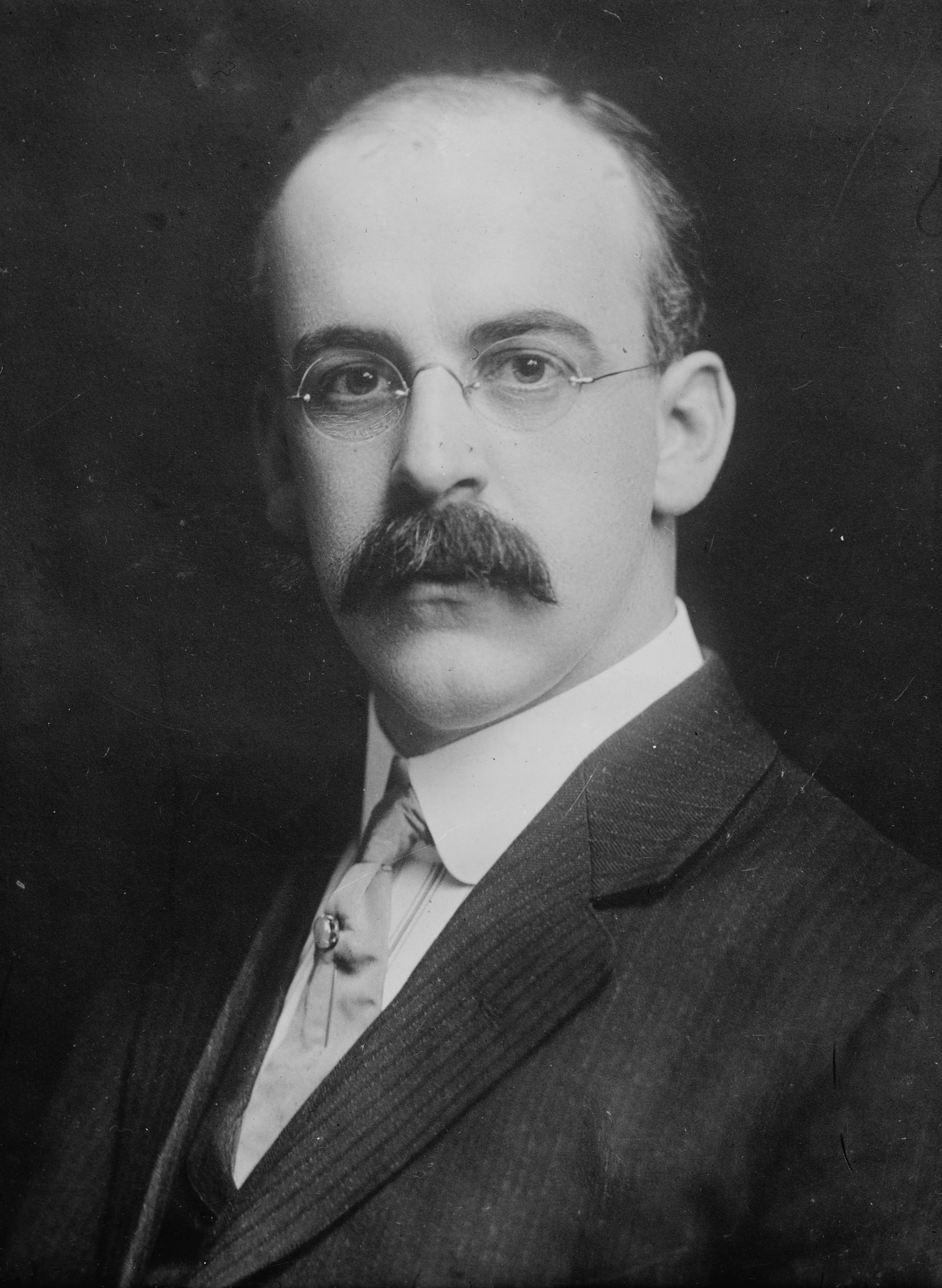
William E. Robertson

== Professionalism ==
The NABBP of America was initially established upon principles of amateurism. However, even early in the Association's history, some star players such as James Creighton of Excelsior received compensation covertly or indirectly. In 1866, the NABBP investigated Athletic of Philadelphia for paying three players including Lip Pike, but ultimately took no action against either the club or the players. In many cases players, quite openly, received a cut of the gate receipts. Clubs playing challenge series were even accused of agreeing beforehand to split the earlier games to guarantee a decisive (and thus more certain to draw a crowd) "rubber match". To address this growing practice, and to restore integrity to the game, at its December 1868 meeting the NABBP established a professional category for the 1869 season. Clubs desiring to pay players were now free to declare themselves professional.

The Cincinnati Red Stockings were the first to declare themselves openly professional, and were aggressive in recruiting the best available players. Twelve clubs, including most of the strongest clubs in the NABBP, ultimately declared themselves professional for the 1869 season.

The first attempt at forming a major league produced the National Association of Professional Base Ball Players, which lasted from 1871 to 1875. The now all-professional Chicago "White Stockings" (today the Chicago Cubs), financed by businessman William Hulbert, became a charter member of the league along with a new Red Stockings club (now the Atlanta Braves), formed in Boston with four former Cincinnati players. The Chicagos were close contenders all season, despite the fact that the Great Chicago Fire had destroyed the team's home field and most of their equipment. Chicago finished the season in second place, but were ultimately forced to drop out of the league during the city's recovery period, finally returning to National Association play in 1874. Over the next couple of seasons, the Boston club dominated the league and hoarded many of the game's best players, even those who were under contract with other teams. After Davy Force signed with Chicago, and then breached his contract to play in Boston, Hulbert became discouraged by the "contract jumping" as well as the overall disorganization of the N.A. (for example, weaker teams with losing records or inadequate gate receipts would simply decline to play out the season), and thus spearheaded the movement to form a stronger organization. The result of his efforts was the formation of a much more "ethical" league, which was named the National League of Professional Base Ball Clubs (NL). After a series of rival leagues were organized but failed (most notably the American Association of Base Ball Clubs (1882–1891), which spawned the clubs which would ultimately become the Cincinnati Reds, Pittsburgh Pirates, St. Louis Cardinals and Brooklyn Dodgers), the current American League (AL), evolving from the minor Western League of 1893, was established in 1901.

== Rise of the major leagues ==
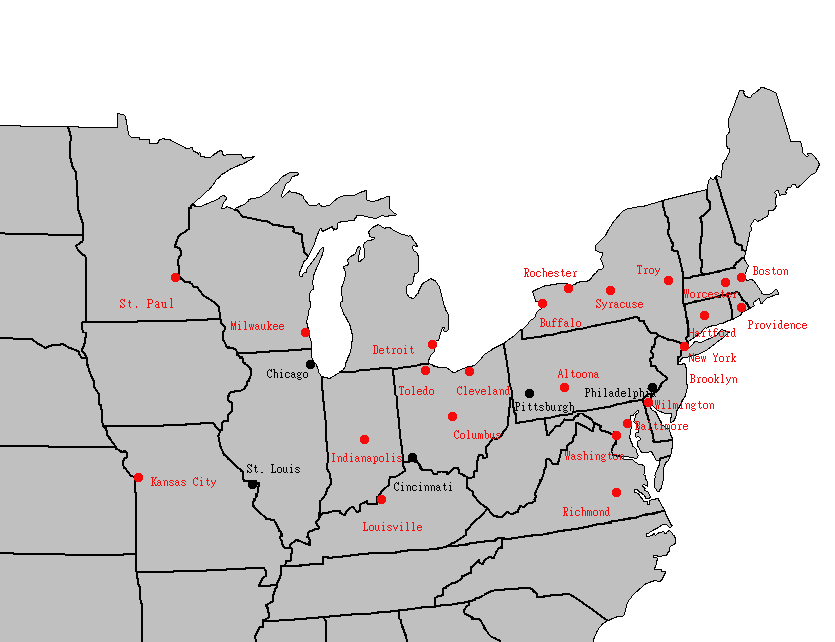
Cities that hosted 19th century MLB teams, with cities that still host their 19th century team in black. With the exception of a team in Washington and a few short-lived teams in Virginia and Kentucky, major league baseball would not expand out of the Northeast and the Midwest until after World War II.

In 1870, a schism developed between professional and amateur ballplayers. The NABBP split into two groups. The National Association of Professional Base Ball Players operated from 1871 through 1875 and is considered by some to have been the first major league. Its amateur counterpart disappeared after only a few years.

William Hulbert's National League, which was formed after the National Association proved ineffective, put its emphasis on "clubs" rather than "players". Clubs now had the ability to enforce player contracts and prevent players from jumping to higher-paying clubs. Clubs in turn were required to play their full schedule of games, rather than forfeiting scheduled games once out of the running for the league championship, a practice that had been common under the National Association. A concerted effort was also made to reduce the amount of gambling on games which was leaving the validity of results in doubt.

Around this time, a gentlemen's agreement was struck between the clubs to exclude non-white players from professional baseball, a de facto ban that remained in effect until 1947. It is a common misconception that Jackie Robinson was the first African-American major-league ballplayer; he was actually only the first after a long gap (and the first in the modern era). Moses Fleetwood Walker and his brother Weldy Walker were unceremoniously dropped from major and minor-league rosters in the 1880s, as were other African-Americans in baseball. An unknown number of African-Americans played in the major leagues by representing themselves as Indians, or South or Central Americans, and a still larger number played in the minor leagues and on amateur teams. In the majors, however, it was not until the signing of Robinson (in the National League) and Larry Doby (in the American League) that baseball began to relax its ban on African-Americans.

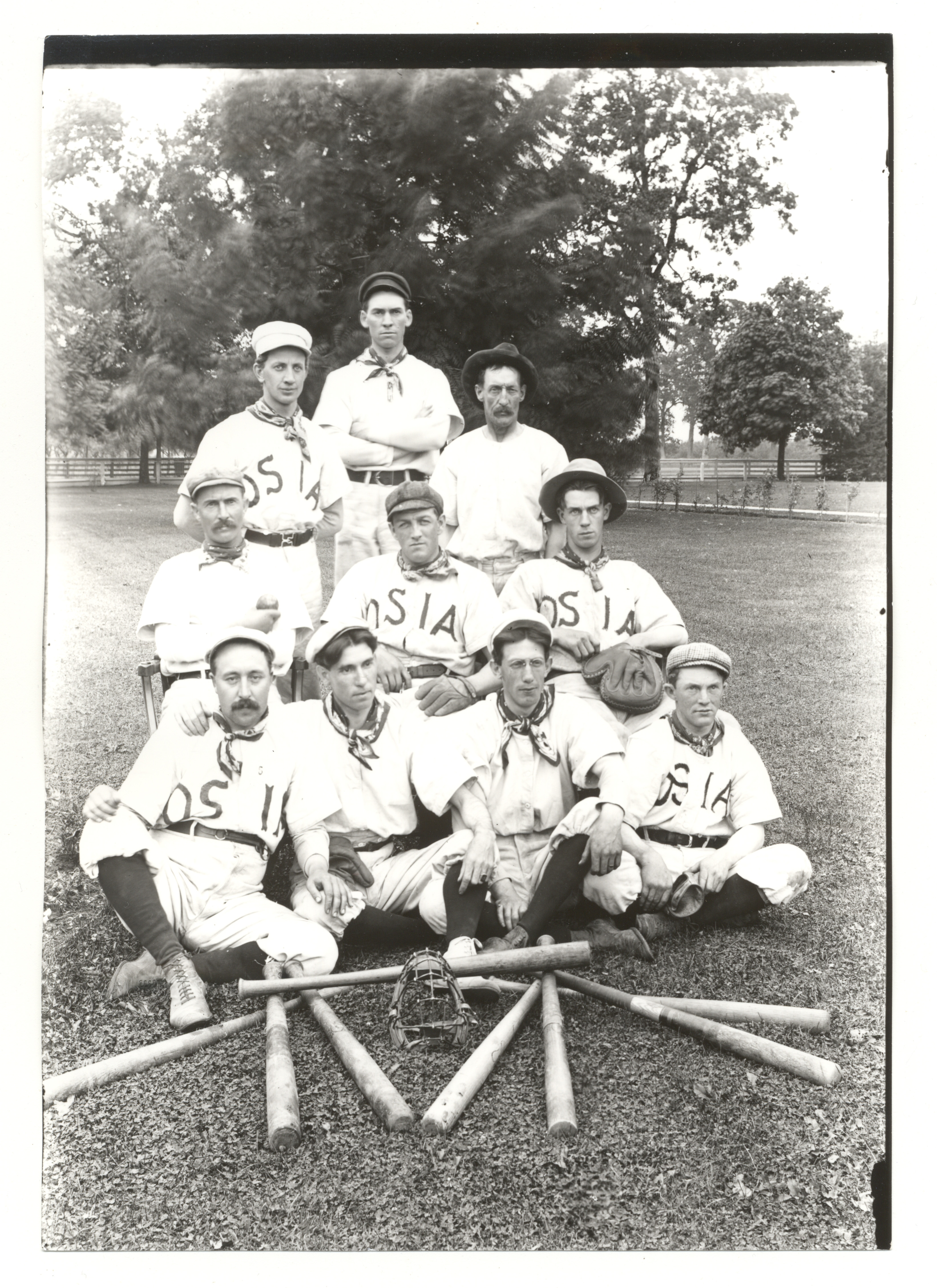
OSIA team

The early years of the National League were tumultuous, with threats from rival leagues and a rebellion by players against the hated "reserve clause", which restricted the free movement of players between clubs. Competitive leagues formed regularly, and disbanded just as regularly. The most successful of these was the American Association of 1882–1891, sometimes called the "beer and whiskey league" for its tolerance of the sale of alcoholic beverages to spectators. For several years, the National League and American Association champions met in a postseason World's Championship Series—the first attempt at a World Series.

The Union Association survived for only one season (1884), as did the Players' League (1890), which was an attempt to return to the National Association structure of a league controlled by the players themselves. Both leagues are considered major leagues by many baseball researchers because of the perceived high caliber of play and the number of star players featured. However, some researchers have disputed the major league status of the Union Association, pointing out that franchises came and went and contending that the St. Louis club, which was deliberately "stacked" by the league's president (who owned that club), was the only club that was anywhere close to major-league caliber.

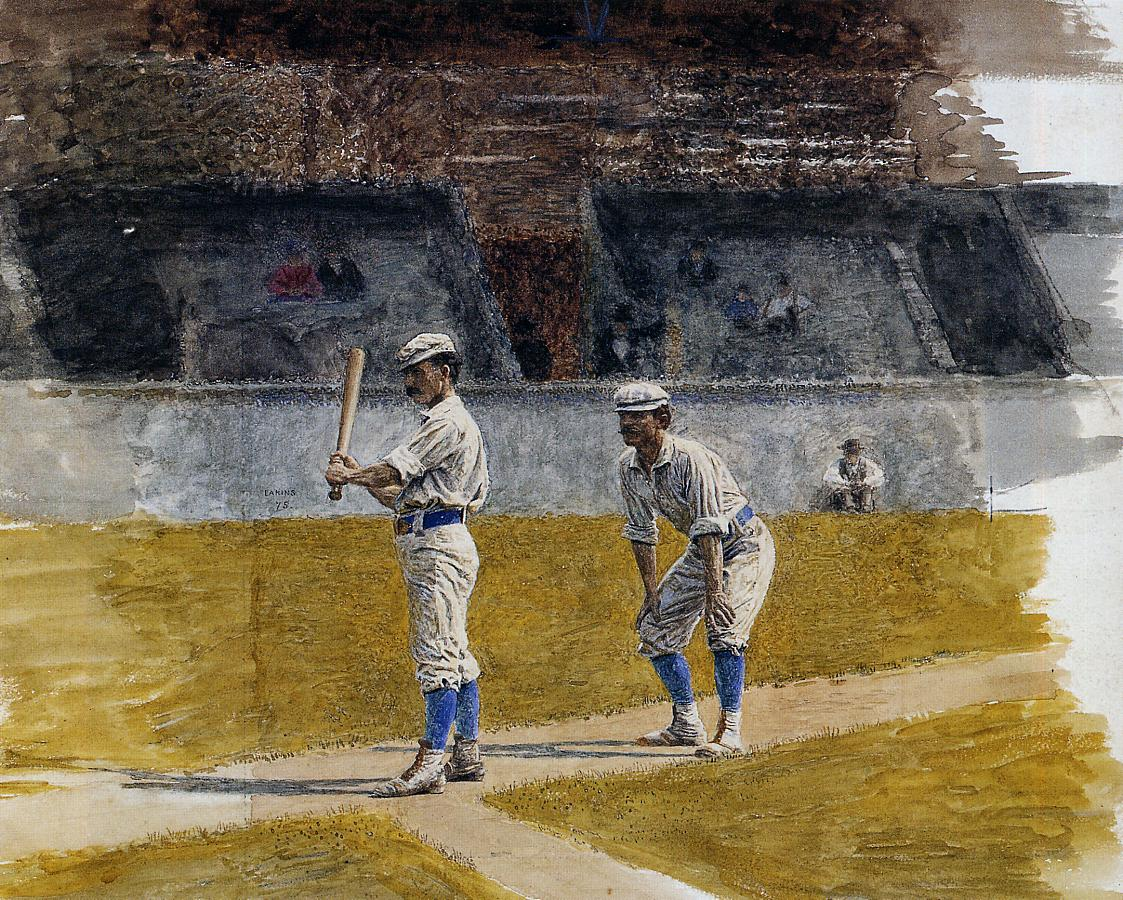
Baseball Players Practicing, by Thomas Eakins (1875)

In fact, there were dozens of leagues, large and small, in the late 19th century. What made the National League "major" was its dominant position in the major cities, particularly the edgy, emotional nerve center of baseball that was New York City. Large, concentrated populations offered baseball teams national media distribution systems and fan bases that could generate sufficient revenues to afford the best players in the country.

A number of the other leagues, including the venerable Eastern League, threatened the dominance of the National League. The Western League, founded in 1893, became particularly aggressive. Its fiery leader Ban Johnson railed against the National League and promised to grab the best players and field the best teams. The Western League began play in April 1894 with teams in Detroit (now the American League Detroit Tigers, the only league team that has not moved since), Grand Rapids, Indianapolis, Kansas City, Milwaukee, Minneapolis, Sioux City and Toledo. Prior to the 1900 season, the league changed its name to the American League and moved several franchises to larger, strategic locations. In 1901 the American League declared its intent to operate as a major league. It is generally agreed that the "modern era" of baseball began this season.

The resulting bidding war for players led to widespread contract-breaking and legal disputes. One of the most famous involved star second baseman Napoleon Lajoie, who in 1901 went across town in Philadelphia from the National League Phillies to the American League Athletics. Barred by a court injunction from playing baseball in the state of Pennsylvania the next year, Lajoie was traded to the Cleveland team, where he played and managed for many years.

The war between the American and National leagues caused shock waves across the baseball world. At a meeting in 1901, the other baseball leagues negotiated a plan to maintain their independence. On September 5, 1901, Eastern League president Patrick T. Powers announced the formation of the second National Association of Professional Baseball Leagues, the NABPL (NA).

These leagues did not consider themselves "minor"—a term that did not come into vogue until St. Louis Cardinals general manager Branch Rickey pioneered the farm system in the 1930s. Nevertheless, these financially troubled leagues, by beginning the practice of selling players to the more affluent National and American leagues, embarked on a path that eventually led to the loss of their independent status.

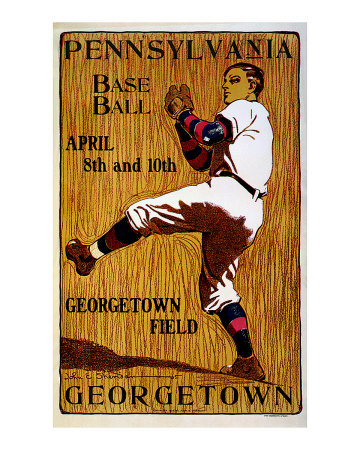
Poster for University of Pennsylvania vs. Georgetown University baseball game, c. 1901, by John E. Sheridan.

Ban Johnson had other designs for the NA. While the NA continues to this day, he saw it as a tool to end threats from smaller rivals who might some day want to expand in other territories and threaten his league's dominance.

After 1902 both leagues and the NABPL signed a new National Agreement which achieved three things:

- First and foremost, it governed player contracts that set up mechanisms to end the cross-league raids on rosters and reinforced the power of the hated reserve clause that kept players virtual slaves to their baseball owner/masters.
- Second, it led to the playing of a "World Series" in 1903 between the two major league champions. The first World Series was won by Boston of the American League.
- Lastly, it established a system of control and dominance for the major leagues over the independents. There would not be another Ban Johnson-like rebellion from the ranks of leagues with smaller cities. Selling off player contracts was rapidly becoming a staple business of the independent leagues. During the rough and tumble years of the American–National struggle, player contracts were violated at the independents as well, as players that a team had developed would sign with the majors without any form of compensation to the indy club.

The new agreement tied independent contracts to the reserve-clause national league contracts. Baseball players were a commodity, like cars. A player's skill set had a price of $5,000. It set up a rough classification system for independent leagues that regulated the dollar value of contracts, the forerunner of the system refined by Rickey and used today.

It also gave the NA great power. Many independents walked away from the 1901 meeting. The deal with the NA punished those other indies who had not joined the NA and submitted to the will of the majors. The NA also agreed to the deal so as to prevent more pilfering of players with little or no compensation for the players' development. Several leagues, seeing the writing on the wall, eventually joined the NA, which grew in size over the next several years.

In the very early part of the 20th century, known as the "dead-ball era", baseball rules and equipment favored the "inside game" and the game was played more violently and aggressively than it is today. This period ended in the 1920s with several changes that gave advantages to hitters. In the largest parks, the outfield fences were brought closer to the infield. In addition, the strict enforcement of new rules governing the construction and regular replacement of the ball caused it to be easier to hit, and be hit harder.

The first professional black baseball club, the Cuban Giants, was organized in 1885. Subsequent professional black baseball clubs played each other independently, without an official league to organize the sport. Rube Foster, a former ballplayer, founded the Negro National League in 1920. A second league, the Eastern Colored League, was established in 1923. These became known as the Negro leagues, though these leagues never had any formal overall structure comparable to the Major Leagues. The Negro National League did well until 1930, but folded during the Great Depression.

From 1942 to 1948, the Negro World Series was revived. This was the golden era of Negro league baseball, a time when it produced some of its greatest stars. In 1947, Jackie Robinson signed a contract with the Brooklyn Dodgers, breaking the color barrier that had prevented talented African-American players from entering the white-only major leagues. Although the transformation was not instantaneous, baseball has since become fully integrated. While the Dodgers' signing of Robinson was a key moment in baseball and civil rights history, it prompted the decline of the Negro leagues. The best black players were now recruited for the Major Leagues, and black fans followed. The last Negro league teams folded in the 1960s.

Pitchers dominated the game in the 1960s and early 1970s. In 1973, the designated hitter (DH) rule was adopted by the American League, while in the National League, the DH rule was not adopted until March 2022. The rule had been applied in a variety of ways during the World Series; until the adoption of the DH by the National League, the DH rule applied when Series games were played in an American League stadium, and pitchers would bat during Series games played in National League stadiums. There had been continued disagreement about the future of the DH rule in the World Series until league-wide adoption of the DH rule.

During the late 1960s, the Baseball Players Union became much stronger and conflicts between owners and the players' union led to major work stoppages in 1972, 1981, and 1994. The 1994 baseball strike led to the cancellation of the World Series, and was not settled until the spring of 1995. In the late 1990s, functions that had been administered separately by the two major leagues' administrations were united under the rubric of MLB.

== The dead-ball era: 1901 to 1919 ==
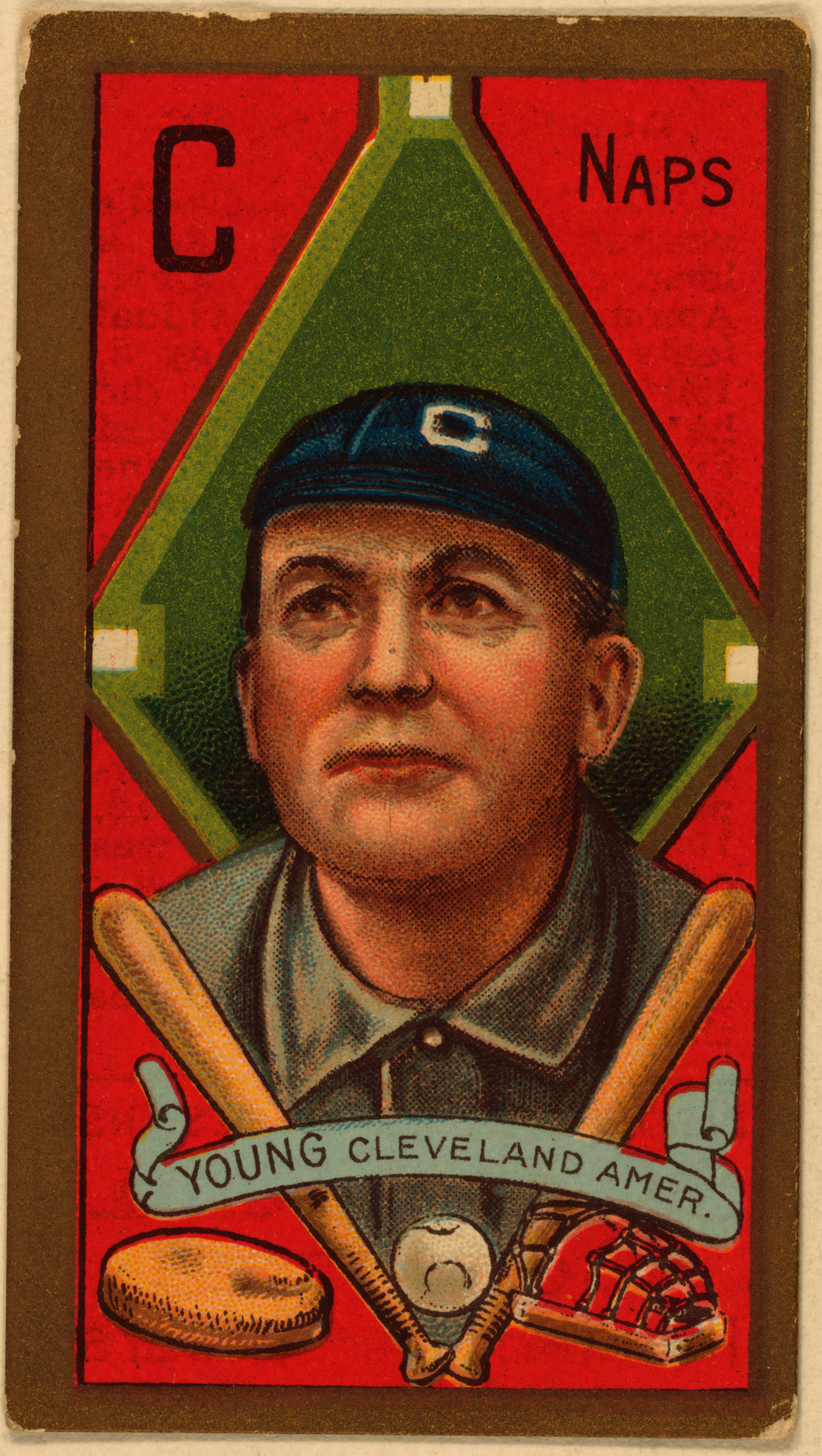
Cy Young, 1911 baseball card

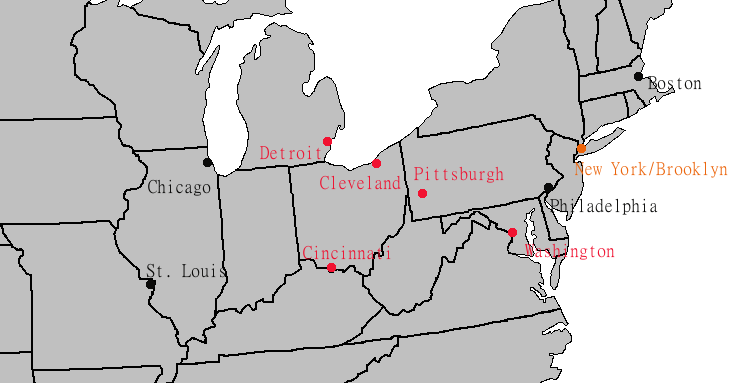
Cities that hosted MLB teams from 1903 to 1953; cities that hosted two teams are in black, cities that hosted one team are in red, and New York/Brooklyn, with three teams, is in orange. Major league baseball did not experience relocation or expansion between 1903 and 1953.

The period 1901–1919 is commonly called the "Dead-ball era", with low-scoring games dominated by pitchers such as Walter Johnson, Cy Young, Christy Mathewson, and Grover Cleveland Alexander. The term also accurately describes the condition of the baseball itself. Baseballs cost three dollars each in 1901, a unit price which would be equal to $116 today. In contrast, modern baseballs purchased in bulk as is the case with professional teams cost about seven dollars each as of 2021 and thus make up a negligible portion of a modern MLB team's operating budget. Due to the much larger relative cost, club owners in the early 20th century were reluctant to spend much money on new balls if not necessary. It was not unusual for a single baseball to last an entire game, nor for a baseball to be reused for the next game especially if it was still in relatively good condition as would likely be the case for a ball introduced late in the game. By the end of the game, the ball would usually be dark with grass, mud, and tobacco juice, and it would be misshapen and lumpy from contact with the bat. Balls were replaced only if they were hit into the crowd and lost, and many clubs employed security guards expressly for the purpose of retrieving balls hit into the stands — a practice unthinkable today.

How To Play Baseball instruction book

As a consequence, home runs were rare, and the "inside game" dominated—singles, bunts, stolen bases, the hit-and-run play, and other tactics dominated the strategies of the time.

Despite this, there were also several superstar hitters, the most famous being Honus Wagner, held to be one of the greatest shortstops to ever play the game, and Detroit's Ty Cobb, the "Georgia Peach." His career batting average of .366 has yet to be bested.

=== The Merkle incident ===
The 1908 pennant races in both the AL and NL were among the most exciting ever witnessed. The conclusion of the National League season, in particular, involved a bizarre chain of events. On September 23, 1908, the New York Giants and Chicago Cubs played a game in the Polo Grounds. Nineteen-year-old rookie first baseman Fred Merkle, later to become one of the best players at his position in the league, was on first base, with teammate Moose McCormick on third with two outs and the game tied. Giants shortstop Al Bridwell socked a single, scoring McCormick and apparently winning the game. However, Merkle, instead of advancing to second base, ran toward the clubhouse to avoid the spectators mobbing the field, which at that time was a common, acceptable practice. The Cubs' second baseman, Johnny Evers, noticed this. In the confusion that followed, Evers claimed to have retrieved the ball and touched second base, forcing Merkle out and nullifying the run scored. Evers brought this to the attention of the umpire that day, Hank O'Day, who after some deliberation called the runner out. Because of the state of the field O'Day thereby called the game. Despite the arguments by the Giants, the league upheld O'Day's decision and ordered the game replayed at the end of the season, if necessary. It turned out that the Cubs and Giants ended the season tied for first place, so the game was indeed replayed, and the Cubs won the game, the pennant, and subsequently the World Series (the last Cubs Series victory until 2016).

For his part, Merkle was doomed to endless ridicule throughout his career (and to a lesser extent for the rest of his life) for this lapse, which went down in history as "Merkle's Boner". In his defense, some baseball historians have suggested that it was not customary for game-ending hits to be fully "run out", it was only Evers's insistence on following the rules strictly that resulted in this unusual play. In fact, earlier in the 1908 season, the identical situation had been brought to the umpires' attention by Evers; the umpire that day was the same Hank O'Day. While the winning run was allowed to stand on that occasion, the dispute raised O'Day's awareness of the rule, and directly set up the Merkle controversy.

=== New places to play ===
Turn-of-the-century baseball attendances were modest by later standards. The average for the 1,110 games in the 1901 season was 3,247. However, the first 20 years of the 20th century saw an unprecedented rise in the popularity of baseball. Large stadiums dedicated to the game were built for many of the larger clubs or existing grounds enlarged, including Tiger Stadium in Detroit, Shibe Park in Philadelphia, Ebbets Field in Brooklyn, the Polo Grounds in Manhattan, Boston's Fenway Park along with Wrigley Field and Comiskey Park in Chicago. Likewise from the Eastern League to the small developing leagues in the West, and the rising Negro leagues professional baseball was being played all across the country. Average major league attendances reached a pre-World War I peak of 5,836 in 1909. Where there were not professional teams, there were semi-professional teams, traveling teams barnstorming, company clubs and amateur men's leagues that drew small but fervent crowds.

=== The "Black Sox" ===
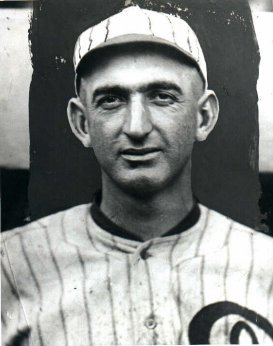
Shoeless Joe Jackson

The fix of baseball games by gamblers and players working together had been suspected as early as the 1850s. Hal Chase was particularly notorious for throwing games, but played for a decade after gaining this reputation; he even managed to parlay these accusations into a promotion to manager. Even baseball stars such as Ty Cobb and Tris Speaker have been credibly alleged to have fixed game outcomes. When MLB's complacency during this "Golden Age" was eventually exposed after the 1919 World Series, it became known as the Black Sox scandal.

After a good regular season (88–52, .629 W%), the Chicago White Sox were heavy favorites to win the 1919 World Series. Even though the National League champion Cincinnati Reds had a better regular season record (96–44, .689 W%,) no one, including gamblers and bookmakers, anticipated the Reds having a chance. When the Reds won 5–3, many pundits cried foul.

At the time of the scandal, the White Sox were arguably the most successful franchise in baseball, with excellent gate receipts and record attendance. At the time, most baseball players were not paid especially well and had to work other jobs during the winter to survive. Some elite players on the big-city clubs made very good salaries, but Chicago was a notable exception.

For many years, the White Sox were owned and operated by Charles Comiskey, who paid the lowest player salaries, on average, in the American League. The White Sox players all intensely disliked Comiskey and his penurious ways, but were powerless to do anything, thanks to baseball's so-called "reserve clause" that prevented players from switching teams without their team owner's consent.

By late 1919, Comiskey's tyrannical reign over the Sox had sown deep bitterness among the players, and White Sox first baseman Arnold "Chick" Gandil decided to conspire to throw the 1919 World Series. He persuaded gambler Joseph "Sport" Sullivan, with whom he had had previous dealings, that the fix could be pulled off for $100,000 total (which would be equal to $1,857,006 today), paid to the players involved. New York gangster Arnold Rothstein supplied the $100,000 that Gandil had requested through his lieutenant Abe Attell, a former featherweight boxing champion.

After the 1919 series, and through the beginning of the 1920 baseball season, rumors swirled that some of the players had conspired to purposefully lose. At last, in 1920, a grand jury was convened to investigate these and other allegations of fixed baseball games. Eight players (Charles "Swede" Risberg, Arnold "Chick" Gandil, "Shoeless" Joe Jackson, Oscar "Happy" Felsch, Eddie Cicotte, George "Buck" Weaver, Fred McMullin, and Claude "Lefty" Williams) were indicted and tried for conspiracy. The players were ultimately acquitted.

However, the damage to the reputation of the sport of baseball led the team owners to appoint Federal judge Kenesaw Mountain Landis to be the first commissioner of baseball. His first act as commissioner was to ban the "Black Sox" from professional baseball for life. The White Sox, meanwhile, would not return to the World Series until 1959, and it was not until their next appearance in 2005 they won the World Series.

== The Negro leagues ==
The Negro leagues were American professional baseball leagues comprising predominantly African-American teams. The term may be used broadly to include professional black teams outside the leagues and it may be used narrowly for the seven relatively successful leagues beginning 1920 that are sometimes termed "Negro major leagues". Moses Fleetwood Walker is considered the first African American in this era to play at the major league.

The first professional team, established in 1885, achieved lasting success as the Cuban Giants, while the first league, the National Colored Base Ball League, failed in 1887 after only two weeks due to low attendance. The Negro American League of 1951 is considered the last major league season and the last professional club, the Indianapolis Clowns, operated amusingly rather than competitively from the mid-1960s to 1980s.

=== The first international leagues ===
While many of the players that made up the black baseball teams were African Americans, many more were Latin Americans (mostly, but not exclusively, black), from nations that continue to deliver talents that make up the Major League rosters of today. Black players moved freely through the rest of baseball, playing in Canadian Baseball, Mexican Baseball, Caribbean Baseball, and Central America and South America, where more than a few achieved a level of fame that was unavailable in the country of their birth.

== Babe Ruth and the end of the dead-ball era ==
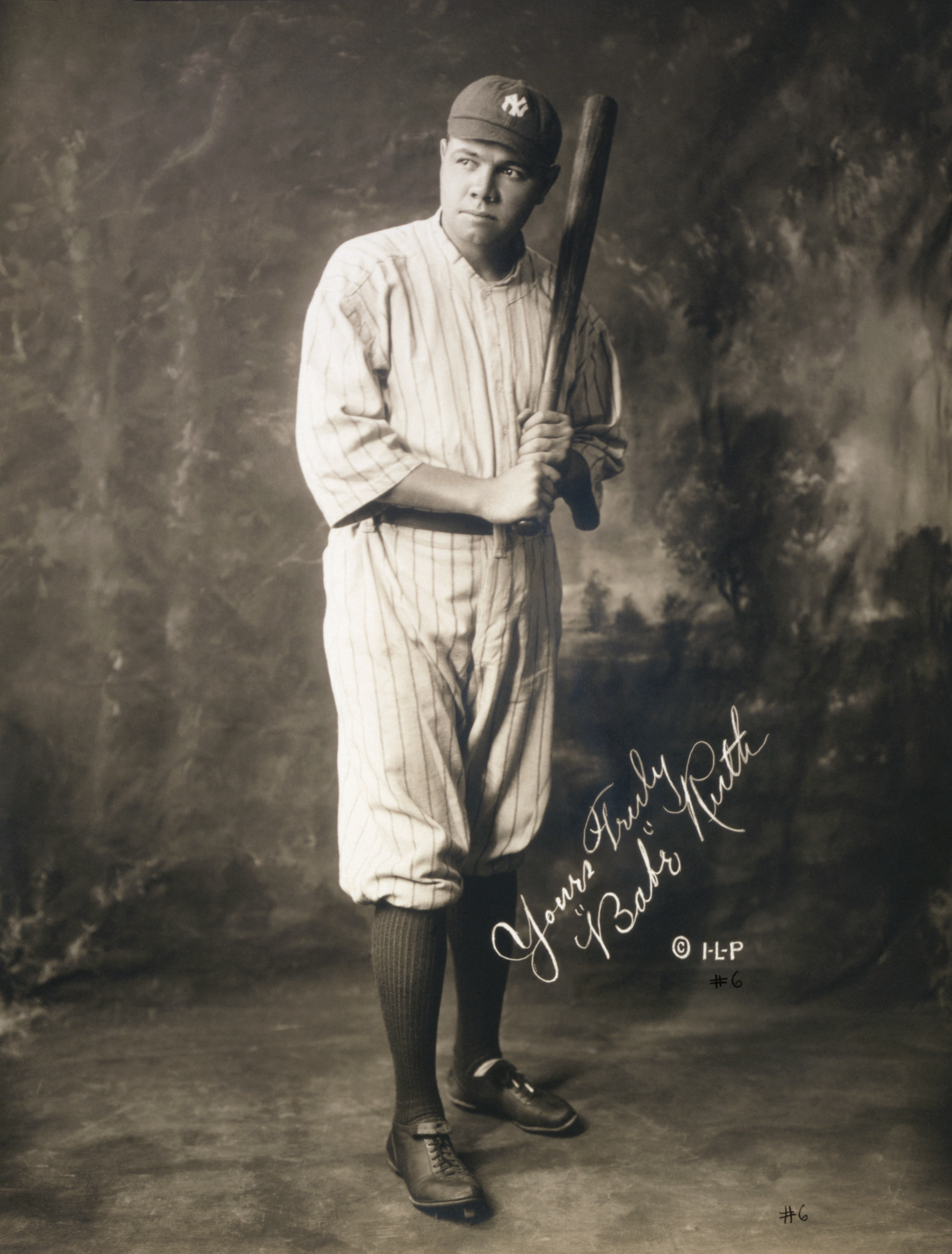
Babe Ruth in 1920.

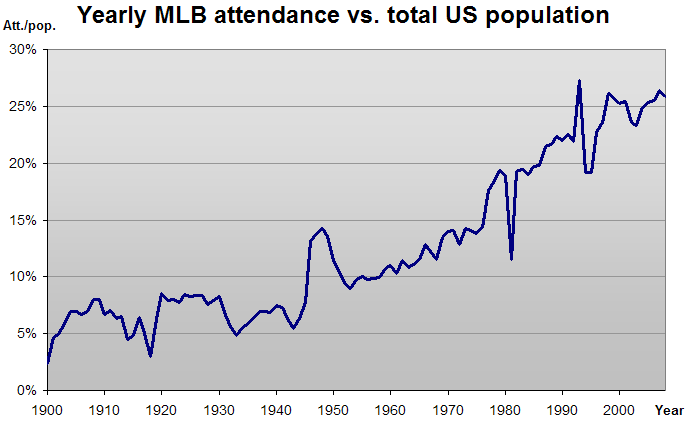
Graph depicting the yearly MLB attendance versus total U.S. population

It was not the Black Sox scandal which put an end to the dead-ball era, but a rule change and a single player.

Some of the increased offensive output can be explained by the 1920 rule change that outlawed tampering with the ball. Pitchers had developed a number of techniques for producing "spitballs", "shine balls" and other trick pitches which had "unnatural" flight through the air. Umpires were now required to put new balls into play whenever the current ball became scuffed or discolored. This rule change was enforced all the more stringently following the death of Ray Chapman, who was struck in the temple by a pitched ball from Carl Mays in a game on August 16, 1920; he died the next day. Discolored balls, harder for batters to see and therefore harder for batters to dodge, have been rigorously removed from play ever since. This meant that batters could now see and hit the ball with less difficulty. With the added prohibition on the ball being purposely wetted or scuffed in any way, pitchers had to rely on pure athletic skill—changes in grip, wrist angle, arm angle and throwing dynamics, plus a new and growing appreciation of the aerodynamic effect of the spinning ball's seams—to pitch with altered trajectories and hopefully confuse or distract batters.

At the end of the 1919 season Harry Frazee, then owner of the Boston Red Sox, sold a group of his star players to the New York Yankees. Among them was George Herman Ruth, known affectionately as "Babe". Ruth's career mirrors the shift in dominance from pitching to hitting at this time. He started his career as a pitcher in 1914, and by 1916 was considered one of the dominant left-handed pitchers in the game. When Edward Barrow, managing the Red Sox, converted him to an outfielder, ballplayers and sportswriters were shocked. It was apparent, however, that Ruth's bat in the lineup every day was far more valuable than Ruth's arm on the mound every fourth day. Ruth swatted 29 home runs in his last season in Boston. The next year, as a Yankee, he would hit 54 and in 1921 he hit 59. His 1927 mark of 60 home runs would last until 1961.

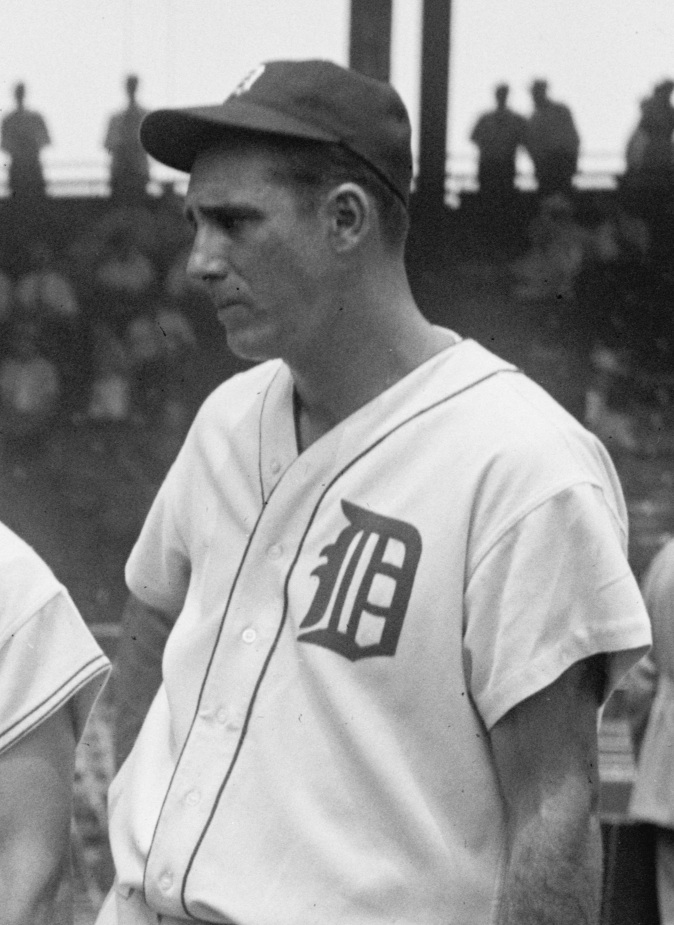
Hall of Famer Hank Greenberg

Ruth's power hitting ability demonstrated a dramatic new way to play the game, one that was extremely popular with fans. Accordingly, ballparks were expanded, sometimes by building outfield "bleacher" seating which shrunk the size of the outfield and made home runs more frequent. In addition to Ruth, hitters such as Rogers Hornsby also took advantage, with Hornsby compiling extraordinary figures for both power and average in the early 1920s. By the late 1920s and 1930s all the good teams had their home-run hitting "sluggers": the Yankees' Lou Gehrig, Jimmie Foxx in Philadelphia, Hank Greenberg in Detroit and in Chicago Hack Wilson were the most storied. While the American League championship, and to a lesser extent the World Series, would be dominated by the Yankees, there were many other excellent teams in the inter-war years. The National League's St. Louis Cardinals, for example, would win three titles in nine years, the last with a group of players known as the "Gashouse Gang".

The first radio broadcast of a baseball game was on August 5, 1921, over Westinghouse station KDKA from Forbes Field in Pittsburgh. Harold Arlin announced the Pirates–Phillies game. Attendances in the 1920s were consistently better than they had been before WWI. The interwar peak average attendance was 8,211 in 1930, but baseball was hit hard by the Great Depression and in 1933 the average fell below five thousand for the only time between the wars. At first wary of radio's potential to impact ticket sales at the park, owners began to make broadcast deals and by the late 1930s, all teams' games went out over the air.

1933 also saw the introduction of the yearly All-Star game, a mid-season break in which the greatest players in each league play against one another in a hard-fought but officially meaningless demonstration game. In 1936 the Baseball Hall of Fame in Cooperstown, New York, was instituted and five players elected: Ty Cobb, Walter Johnson, Christy Mathewson, Babe Ruth and Honus Wagner. The Hall formally opened in 1939 and, of course, remains open to this day.

== The war years ==
In 1941, a year which saw the premature death of Lou Gehrig, Boston's great left fielder Ted Williams had a batting average over .400—the last time anyone has achieved that feat. During the same season Joe DiMaggio hit successfully in 56 consecutive games, an accomplishment both unprecedented and unequaled.

After the United States entered World War II after the attack on Pearl Harbor, Landis asked Franklin D. Roosevelt whether professional baseball should continue during the war. In the "Green Light Letter", the US president replied that baseball was important to national morale, and asked for more night games so day workers could attend. Thirty-five Hall of Fame members and more than 500 Major League Baseball players served in the war, but with the exception of D-Day, games continued. Both Williams and DiMaggio would miss playing time in the services, with Williams also flying later in the Korean War. During this period Stan Musial led the St. Louis Cardinals to the 1942, 1944 and 1946 World Series titles. The war years also saw the founding of the All-American Girls Professional Baseball League.

Baseball boomed after World War II. 1945 saw a new attendance record and the following year average crowds leapt nearly 70% to 14,914. Further records followed in 1948 and 1949, when the average reached 16,913. While average attendances slipped to somewhat lower levels through the 1950s, 1960s and the first half of the 1970s, they remained well above pre-war levels, and total seasonal attendance regularly hit new highs from 1962 onward as the number of major league teams—and games—increased.

== Racial integration in baseball ==
The post-War years in baseball also witnessed the racial integration of the sport. Participation by African Americans in organized baseball had been precluded since the 1890s by formal and informal agreements, with only a few players being surreptitiously included in lineups on a sporadic basis.

American society as a whole moved toward integration in the post-War years, partially as a result of the distinguished service by African American military units such as the Tuskegee Airmen, 366th Infantry Regiment, and others. During the baseball winter meetings in 1943, noted African-American athlete and actor Paul Robeson campaigned for integration of the sport. After World War II ended, several team managers considered recruiting members of the Negro leagues for entry into organized baseball. In the early 1920s, New York Giants' manager John McGraw tried to slip a black player, Charlie Grant, into his lineup (reportedly by passing him off to the front office as an Indian), and McGraw's wife reported finding names of dozens of black players that McGraw fantasized about signing, after his death. Pittsburgh Pirates owner Bill Bensawanger reportedly signed Josh Gibson to a contract in 1943, and the Washington Senators were also said to be interested in his services. But those efforts (and others) were opposed by Kenesaw Mountain Landis, baseball's powerful commissioner and a staunch segregationist. Bill Veeck claimed that Landis blocked his purchase of the Philadelphia Phillies because he planned to integrate the team. While this account is disputed, Landis was in fact opposed to integration, and his death in 1944 (and subsequent replacement as Commissioner by Happy Chandler) removed a major obstacle for black players in the Major Leagues.

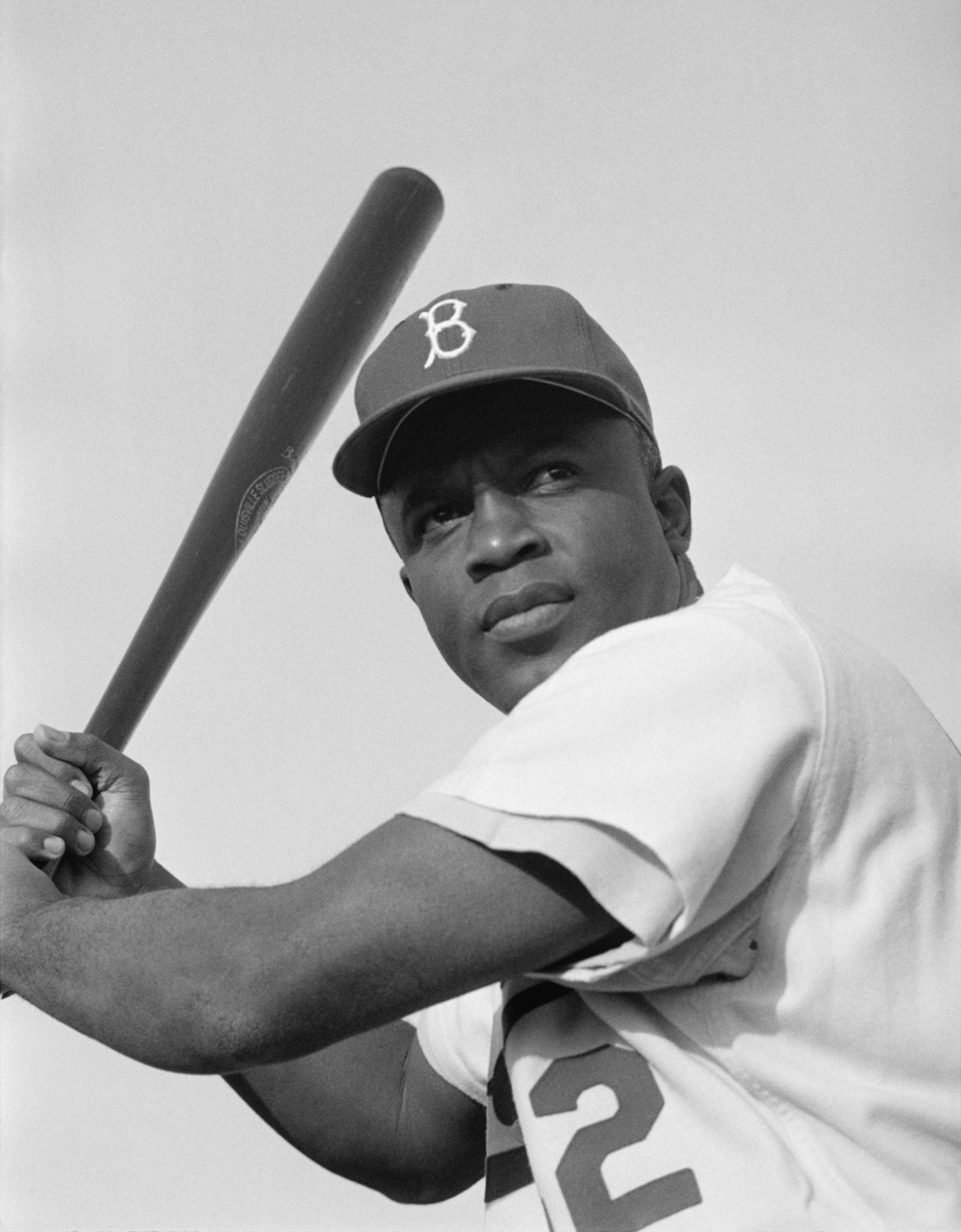
Jackie Robinson in 1954

The general manager who would be eventually successful in breaking the color barrier was Branch Rickey of the Brooklyn Dodgers. Rickey himself had experienced the issue of segregation. While playing and coaching for his college team at Ohio Wesleyan University, Rickey had a black teammate named Charles Thomas. On a road trip through southern Ohio, his fellow player was refused a room in a hotel. Although Rickey was able to get the player into his room for that night, he was taken aback when he reached his room to find Thomas upset and crying about this injustice. Rickey related this incident as an example of why he wanted a full desegregation of not only baseball, but the entire nation.

In the mid-1940s, Rickey had compiled a list of Negro league ballplayers for possible Major League contracts. Realizing that the first African-American signee would be a magnet for prejudiced sentiment, however, Rickey was intent on finding a player with the distinguished personality and character that would allow him to tolerate the inevitable abuse. Rickey's sights eventually settled on Jackie Robinson, a shortstop with the Kansas City Monarchs. Although probably not the best player in the Negro leagues at the time, Robinson was an exceptional talent, was college-educated, and had the marketable distinction of having served as an officer during World War II. Even more importantly, Rickey judged Robinson to possess the inner strength to withstand the inevitable harsh animosity to come. To prepare him for the task, Rickey played Robinson in 1946 for the Dodgers' minor league team, the Montreal Royals, which proved an arduous emotional challenge, though Robinson enjoyed fervently enthusiastic support from the Montreal fans. On April 15, 1947, Robinson broke the color barrier, which had been tacitly recognized for almost 75 years, with his appearance for the Brooklyn Dodgers at Ebbets Field.

Eleven weeks later, on July 5, 1947, the American League was integrated by the signing of Larry Doby to the Cleveland Indians. Over the next few years, a handful of black baseball players made appearances in the majors, including Roy Campanella (teammate to Robinson in Brooklyn) and Satchel Paige (teammate to Doby in Cleveland). Paige, who had pitched more than 2,400 innings in the Negro leagues, sometimes two and three games a day, was still effective at 42, and still playing at 59. His ERA in the Major Leagues was 3.29.

However, the initial pace of integration was slow. By 1953, only six of the sixteen major league teams had a black player on the roster. The Boston Red Sox became the last major league team to integrate its roster with the addition of Pumpsie Green on July 21, 1959. While limited in numbers, the on-field performance of early black Major League players was outstanding. In the fourteen years from 1947 to 1960, black players won one or more of the Rookie of the Year awards nine times.

While never prohibited in the same fashion as African Americans, Latin American players also benefitted greatly from the integration era. In 1951, two Chicago White Sox, Venezuelan-born Chico Carrasquel and Cuban-born (and black) Minnie Miñoso, became the first Hispanic All-Stars.

According to some baseball historians, Jackie Robinson and the other African-American players helped reestablish the importance of baserunning and similar elements of play that were previously de-emphasized by the predominance of power hitting.

From 1947 to the 1970s, African-American participation in baseball rose steadily. By 1974, 27% of baseball players were African American. As a result of this on-field experience, minorities began to experience long-delayed gains in managerial positions within baseball. In 1975, Frank Robinson (who had been the 1956 Rookie of the Year with the Cincinnati Reds) was named player-manager of the Cleveland Indians, making him the first African-American manager in the major leagues.

Although these front-office gains continued, Major League Baseball saw a lengthy slow decline in the percentage of black players after the mid-1970s. By 2007, African Americans made up less than 9% of Major League players. While this trend is largely attributed to an increased emphasis on recruitment of players from Latin America (with the number of Hispanic players in the major leagues rising to 29% by 2007), other factors have been cited as well. Hall of Fame player Dave Winfield, for instance, has pointed out that urban America provides fewer resources for youth baseball than in the past. Despite this continued prevalence of Hispanic players, the percentage of black players rose again in 2008 to 10.2%.

Arturo Moreno became the first Hispanic owner of an MLB franchise when he purchased the Anaheim Angels in 2004.

In 2005, a Racial and Gender Report Card on Major League Baseball was issued, which generally found positive results on the inclusion of African Americans and Latinos in baseball, and gave Major League Baseball a grade of "A" or better for opportunities for players, managers and coaches as well as for MLB's central office. At that time, 37% of major league players were people of color: Latino (26 percent), African American (9 percent) or Asian (2 percent). Also by 2004, 29% of the professional staff in MLB's central office were people of color, 11% of team vice presidents were people of color, and seven of the league's managers were of color (four African Americans and three Latinos).

== Expansion era ==
Baseball had been in the West for almost as long as the National League and the American League had been around. It evolved into the Pacific Coast League (PCL), which included the Hollywood Stars, Los Angeles Angels, Oakland Oaks, Portland Beavers, Sacramento Solons, San Francisco Seals, San Diego Padres, Seattle Rainiers.

The PCL was huge in the West, but as a member of the National Association of Professional Baseball Leagues, it kept losing its top players to the National and the American leagues for less than $8,000 a player.

The PCL was far more independent than the other "minor" leagues, and rebelled continuously against their Eastern masters. Clarence Pants Rowland, the President of the PCL, took on baseball commissioners Kenesaw Mountain Landis and Happy Chandler at first to get better equity from the major leagues, then to form a third major league. His efforts were rebuffed by both commissioners. Chandler and several of the owners, who saw the value of the markets in the West, started to plot the extermination of the PCL. They had one thing that Rowland did not: The financial power of the Eastern major league baseball establishment.

No one was going to back a PCL club building a major-league size stadium if the National or the American League was going to build one too, which discouraged investment in PCL ballparks. PCL games and rivalries still drew fans, but the leagues' days of dominance in the West were numbered.

=== 1953–1955 ===
Major Leagues, 1901 to 1960 (before expansion)
(move)	National League	City	American League	(move)
to Milwaukee 1953 ←	Braves	Boston	Red Sox	
	Phillies	Philadelphia	Athletics	→ to Kansas City 1955
to San Francisco 1958 ←	Giants	New York City	Yankees	[ ← Baltimore Orioles 1901–2 ]
to Los Angeles 1958 ←	Dodgers	Brooklyn		
		Washington, D.C.	Senators	→ Minnesota Twins 1961
	Pirates	Pittsburgh		
	Reds	Cincinnati		
		Cleveland	Indians	
		Detroit	Tigers	
	Cubs	Chicago	White Sox	
	Cardinals	St. Louis	Browns	[ ← Milwaukee Brewers 1901 ] → Baltimore Orioles 1954
New Major League homes, 1953 to 1960
Former city	National League	New city	American League	Former city
Boston 1871 → [ to Atlanta 1966 ← ]	Braves (1953)	Milwaukee		
		Baltimore	Orioles (1954)	← Milwaukee Brewers 1901 ← St. Louis Browns 1902–53
		Kansas City	Athletics (1955)	← Philadelphia 1871 [ → to Oakland 1968 ]
New York 1883 →	Giants (1958)	San Francisco		
Brooklyn 1883 →	Dodgers (1958)	Los Angeles		

Until the 1950s, major league baseball franchises had been largely confined to the northeastern United States, with the teams and their locations remaining unchanged from 1903 to 1952. The first team to relocate in fifty years was the Boston Braves, who moved in 1953 to Milwaukee, where the club set attendance records. In 1954, the St. Louis Browns moved to Baltimore and were renamed the Baltimore Orioles. These relocations can be seen as a full-circle ending to the classic era, which began with the moves of teams from Milwaukee and Baltimore. In 1955, the Philadelphia Athletics moved to Kansas City.

=== National League Baseball leaves New York ===
In 1958 the major league baseball market in New York went through significant realignment. As the Yankees increasingly dominated the local market, the Brooklyn Dodgers and the New York Giants sought relocation to the Western United States, attracted by the prospect of fan bases in smaller markets. The relocation of these two franchises to the region's largest cities, Los Angeles and San Francisco, was strategically intended to prevent the PCL from expanding into a third major league. To incentivize this move, Los Angeles officials provided Dodgers owner Walter O'Malley a helicopter tour of the city and asked him to pick a stadium spot. Meanwhile, the Giants secured a temporary lease at Seals Stadium, home of the PCL San Francisco Seals while Candlestick Park was under construction to be their permanent home stadium.

=== California ===
The logical first candidates for major league "expansion" were the same metropolitan areas that had just attracted the Dodgers and Giants. It is said that the Dodgers and Giants—National League rivals in New York City—chose their new cities because Los Angeles (in southern California) and San Francisco (in northern California) already had a fierce rivalry (geographical, economic, cultural and political), dating back to the state's founding. The only California expansion team—and also the first in Major League Baseball in over 70 years—was the Los Angeles Angels (later the California Angels, the Anaheim Angels, Los Angeles Angels of Anaheim, before reverting to Los Angeles Angels in 2016), who brought the American League to southern California in 1961. Northern California, however, would later gain its own American League team, in 1968, when the Athletics would move again, settling in Oakland, across San Francisco Bay from the Giants.

=== 1961–1962 ===
Along with the Angels, the other 1961 expansion team was the Washington Senators, who joined the American League and took over the nation's capital when the previous Senators moved to Minnesota and became the Twins. 1961 is also noted as being the year in which Roger Maris surpassed Babe Ruth's single season home run record, hitting 61 for the New York Yankees, albeit in a slightly longer season than Ruth's. To keep pace with the American League—which now had ten teams—the National League likewise expanded to ten teams, in 1962, with the addition of the Houston Colt .45s and New York Mets.

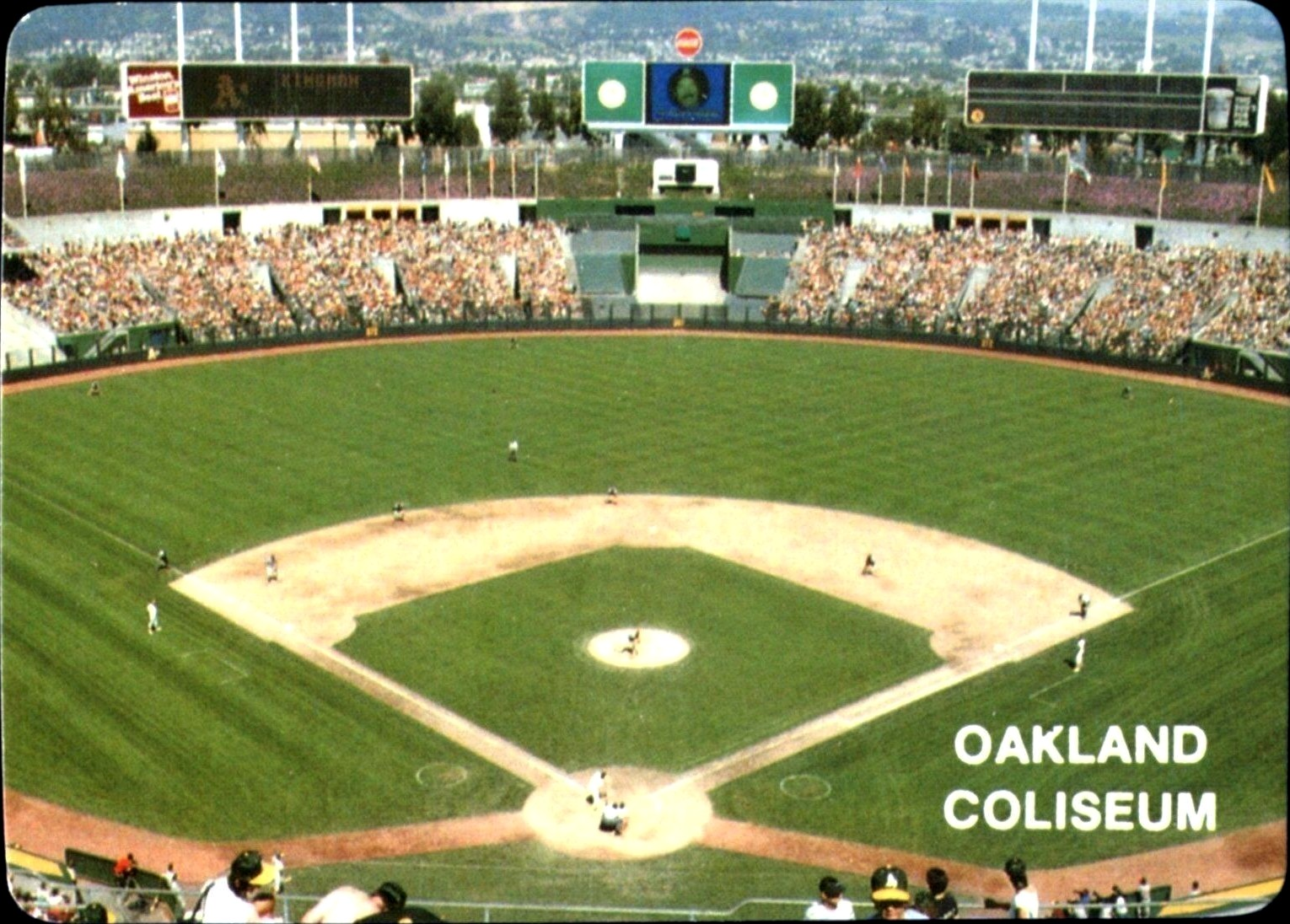
Oakland–Alameda County Coliseum, opened in 1966, was built in part to lure the Athletics from Kansas City.

=== 1969 ===
In 1969, the American League expanded when the Kansas City Royals and Seattle Pilots, the latter in a longtime PCL stronghold, were admitted to the league. The Pilots stayed just one season in Seattle before moving to Milwaukee and becoming today's Milwaukee Brewers. The National League also added two teams that year, the Montreal Expos and San Diego Padres. Given the size of the expanded leagues, 12 teams apiece, each split into East and West divisions, with a playoff series to determine the pennant winner and World Series contender—the first post-season baseball instituted since the advent of the World Series itself.

The Padres were the last of the core PCL teams to be absorbed. The Coast League did not die, though. After reforming and moving into new markets, it successfully transformed into a Class AAA league.

=== 1972–2013 ===
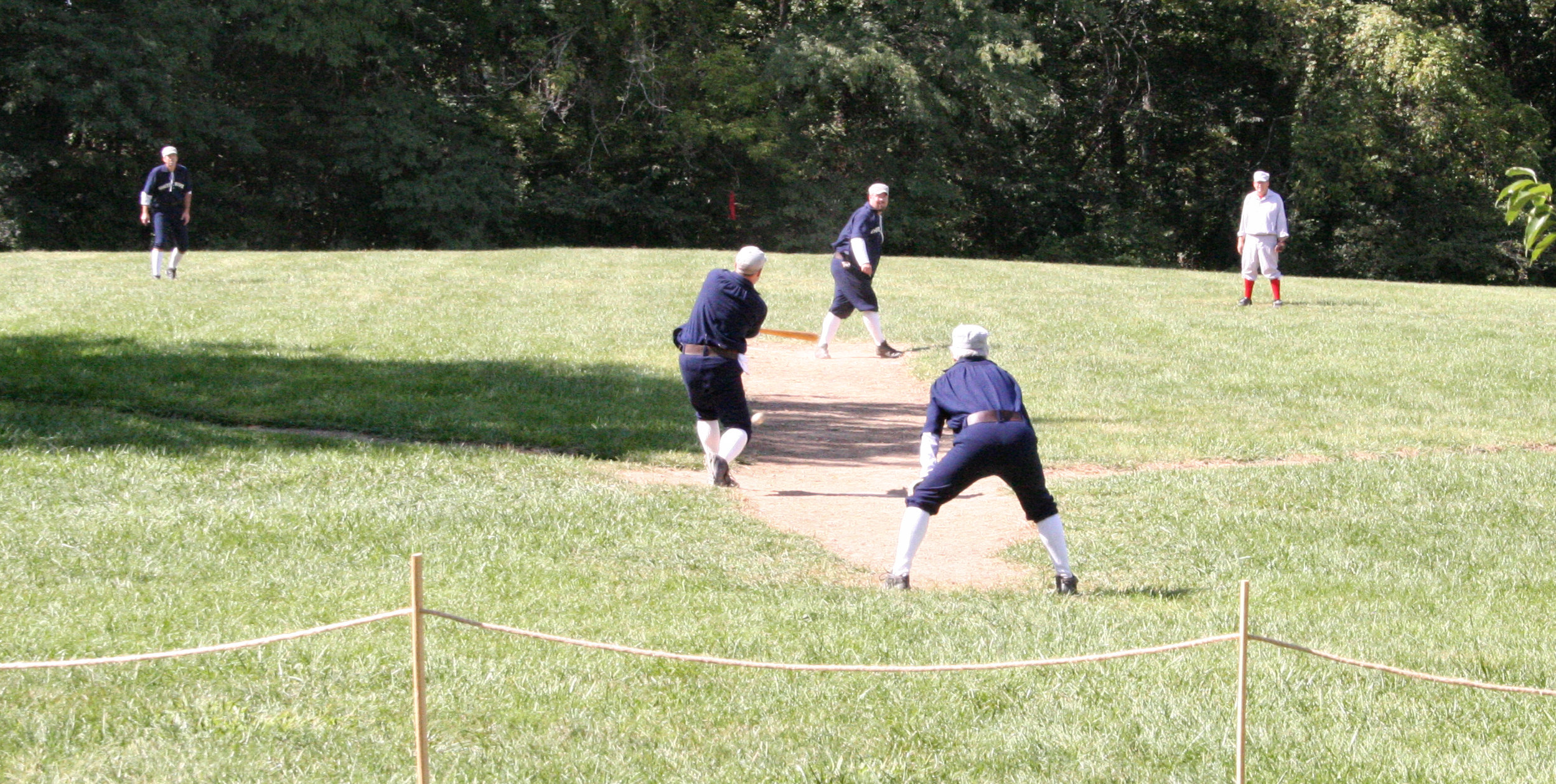
A 2005 vintage base ball game, played by 1886 rules. Vintage games are live contests that seek to portray the authenticity of the early game. (The term "reenactment" is a common misnomer; games are contested and not meant to recreate a specific historical event.)

In 1972, the second Washington Senators moved to the Dallas–Fort Worth area and became the Texas Rangers.

In 1977, the American League expanded to fourteen teams, with the newly formed Seattle Mariners and Toronto Blue Jays. Sixteen years later, in 1993, the National League likewise expanded to fourteen teams, with the newly formed Colorado Rockies and Florida Marlins (now Miami Marlins).

Beginning with the 1994 season, both the AL and the NL were divided into three divisions (East, West, and Central), with the addition of a wild card team (the team with the best record among those finishing in second place) to enable four teams in each league to advance to the preliminary division series. However, due to the 1994–95 Major League Baseball strike (which canceled the 1994 World Series), the new rules did not go into effect until the 1995 World Series.

In 1998, the AL and the NL each added a fifteenth team, for a total of thirty teams in Major League Baseball. The Arizona Diamondbacks joined the National League, and the Tampa Bay Devil Rays—now called simply the Rays—joined the American League. In order to keep the number of teams in each league at an even number—with 14 in the AL and 16 in the NL—Milwaukee changed leagues and became a member of the National League. Two years later, the NL and AL ended their independent corporate existences and merged into a new legal entity named Major League Baseball; the two leagues remained as playing divisions. In 2001, MLB took over the struggling Montreal Expos franchise and, after the 2004 season, moved it to Washington, DC, which had been clamoring for a team ever since the second Senators' departure in 1972; the club was renamed the Nationals.

In 2013, in keeping with Commissioner Bud Selig's desire for expanded interleague play, the Houston Astros were shifted from the National to the American League; with an odd number (15) in each league, an interleague contest was played somewhere almost every day during the season. At this time the divisions within each league were shuffled to create six equal divisions of five teams.

== Pitching dominance and rules changes ==
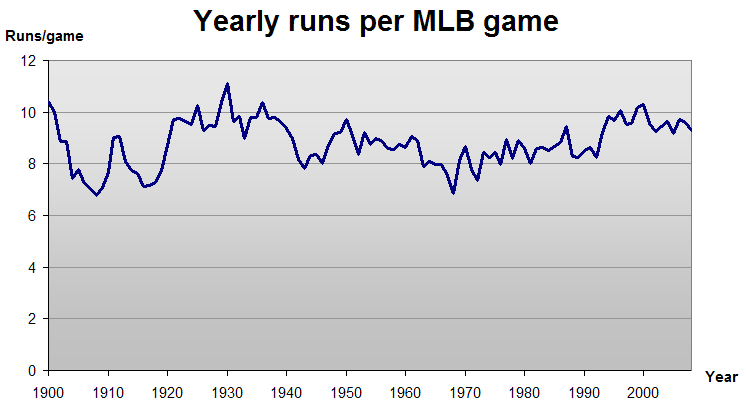
Graph showing, by year, the average number of runs per MLB game

By the late 1960s, the balance between pitching and hitting had swung back to favor of the pitchers once more. In 1968 Carl Yastrzemski won the American League batting title with an average of just .301, the lowest in history. That same year, Detroit Tigers pitcher Denny McLain won 31 games—making him the last pitcher to win 30 games in a season. St. Louis Cardinals starting pitcher Bob Gibson achieved an equally remarkable feat by allowing an ERA of just 1.12.

In response to these events, major league baseball implemented certain rule changes in 1969 to benefit the batters. The pitcher's mound was lowered, and the strike zone was reduced.

In 1973 the American League, which had been suffering from much lower attendance than the National League, made a move to increase scoring even further by initiating the designated hitter rule.

== Players assert themselves ==
Hall of Famer Sandy Koufax, who refused to re-sign his contract and held out in 1966

From the time of the formation of the Major Leagues to the 1960s, the team owners controlled the game. After the so-called "Brotherhood Strike" of 1890 and the failure of the Brotherhood of Professional Base Ball Players and its Players National League, the owners' control of the game seemed absolute. It lasted over 70 years despite a number of short-lived players organizations. In 1966, however, the players enlisted the help of labor union activist Marvin Miller to form the Major League Baseball Players Association (MLBPA). The same year, Sandy Koufax and Don Drysdale—both Cy Young Award winners for the Los Angeles Dodgers—refused to re-sign their contracts, jointly holding out for better contracts. The era of the reserve clause, which held players to one team, was drawing to an end.

The first legal challenge came in 1970. Backed by the MLBPA, St. Louis Cardinals outfielder Curt Flood took the leagues to court to negate a player trade, citing the 13th Amendment and antitrust legislation. In 1972, he finally lost his case before the United States Supreme Court by a vote of 5 to 3, but gained large-scale public sympathy, and the damage had been done. The reserve clause survived, but it had been irrevocably weakened. In 1975, Andy Messersmith of the Dodgers and Dave McNally of the Montreal Expos played without contracts, and then declared themselves free agents in response to an arbitrator's ruling. Handcuffed by concessions made in the Flood case, the owners had no choice but to accept the collective bargaining package offered by the MLBPA, and the reserve clause was effectively ended, to be replaced by the current system of free-agency and arbitration.

While the legal challenges were going on, the game continued. In 1969, the "Miracle Mets", just seven years after their formation, recorded their first winning season, won the National League East and finally the World Series.

On the field, the 1970s saw some of the longest-standing records fall, along with the rise of two powerhouse dynasties. In Oakland, the Swinging A's were overpowering, winning the Series in 1972, 1973 and 1974, and five straight division titles. The strained relationships between teammates, who included Catfish Hunter, Vida Blue and Reggie Jackson, gave the lie to the need for "chemistry" between players. The National League, on the other hand, belonged to the Big Red Machine in Cincinnati, where Sparky Anderson's team, which included Pete Rose as well as Hall of Famers Tony Pérez, Johnny Bench and Joe Morgan, succeeded the A's run in 1975.

The decade also contained great individual achievements. On April 8, 1974, Hank Aaron of the Atlanta Braves hit his 715th career home run, surpassing Babe Ruth's all-time record. He would retire in 1976 with 755, and that was just one of numerous records he achieved, many of which, including total bases, still stand today. There was great pitching too: between 1973 and 1975, Nolan Ryan threw four "no-hit" games. He would add a record-breaking fifth in 1981 and two more before his retirement in 1993, by which time he had also accumulated 5,714 strikeouts, another record, in a 27-year career.

== The marketing and hype era ==
From the 1980s onward, the major league game changed dramatically, due to the combined effects of free agency, improvements in the science of sports conditioning, changes in the marketing and television broadcasting of sporting events, and the push by brand-name products for greater visibility. Stadium crowds generally grew. Average attendances first broke 20,000 in 1979 and 30,000 in 1993. That year total attendance hit 70 million, but baseball was hit hard by a strike in 1994, and as of 2005 it had marginally improved on those 1993 records. (Update: Between 2009 and 2017, average attendance hovered just over the 30,000 mark, with numbers falling into the 28,000s in '18 and '19. The 2019 season saw a million fewer tickets sold than the banner year of 2007, however revenues to major league baseball from media rights fees increased total revenue to $10 billion in 2018, a 70% rise from a decade before.)

=== The science of the sport changes the game ===
During the 1980s, significant advances were made in the science of physical conditioning. Weight rooms and training equipment were improved. Trainers and doctors developed better diets and regimens to make athletes bigger, healthier, and stronger than they had ever been.

Another major change that had been occurring during this time was the adoption of the pitch count. Starting pitchers who played complete games had not been an unusual thing in baseball's history. Now, pitchers were throwing harder than ever and pitching coaches watched to see how many pitches a player had thrown over the game. At anywhere from 100 to 125, pitchers increasingly would be pulled out to preserve their arms. Bullpens began to specialize more, with more pitchers being trained as middle relievers, and a few hurlers, usually possessing high velocity but not much durability, as closers. The science of maximizing effectiveness and career duration, while attempting to minimize injury and downtime, is an ongoing pursuit by coaches and kinesiologists.

Along with the expansion of teams, the addition of more pitchers needed to play a complete game stressed the total number of quality players available in a system that restricted its talent searches at that time to America, Canada, Latin America, and the Caribbean.

=== Television ===
The arrival of live televised sports in the 1950s increased attention and revenue for all major league clubs at first. The television programming was extremely regional, hurting the non-televised minor and independent leagues most. People stayed home to watch Maury Wills rather than watch unknowns at their local baseball park. Major League Baseball, as it always did, made sure that it controlled rights and fees charged for the broadcasts of all games, just as it had on radio.

The national networks began televising national games of the week, opening the door for a national audience to see particular clubs. While most teams were broadcast in the course of a season, emphasis tended toward the league leaders with famous players and the major market franchises that could draw the largest audience.

=== The rise of cable ===
In the 1970s the cable revolution began. The Atlanta Braves became a power contender with greater revenues generated by WTBS, Ted Turner's Atlanta-based Super-Station, broadcast as "America's Team" to cable households nationwide. The roll-out of ESPN, then regional sports networks (now mostly under the umbrella of Fox Sports Net) changed sports news in general and particularly baseball with its relatively huge number of games-per-season. Now under the microscope of news organizations that needed to fill 24 programming hours per day, the amount of attention—and salary—paid to major league players grew exponentially. Players who would have sought off-season jobs to make ends meet just 20 years earlier were now well-paid professionals at least, and multi-millionaires in many cases. This super-star status often rested on careers that were not as compelling as those of the baseball heroes of a less media-intense time.

As player contract values soared, and the number of broadcasters, commentators, columnists, and sports writers also multiplied. The competition for a fresh angle on any story became fierce. Media pundits began questioning the high salaries paid to players when on-field performance was deemed less than deserving. Critical commentary was more of a draw than praise, and coverage began to become intensely negative. Players' personal lives, which had always been off-limits except under extreme circumstances, became the fodder of editorials, insider stories on TV, and features in magazines. When the use of performance-enhancing drugs became an issue, drawing scornful criticism from fans and pundits, the gap between the sports media and the players whom they covered widened further.

With the development of satellite television and digital cable, Major League Baseball launched channels with season-subscription fees, making it possible for fans to watch virtually every game played, in both major leagues, everywhere, in real time.

==== Team networks ====
The next refinement of baseball on cable was the creation of single-team cable networks. YES Network & NESN, the New York Yankees & Boston Red Sox cable television networks, respectively, took in millions to broadcast games not only in New York and Boston but around the country. These networks generated as much revenue as, or more than, revenue annually for large-market teams' baseball operations. By fencing these channels off in separate corporate entities, owners were able to exclude the income from consideration during contract negotiations.

=== Merchandise, endorsements and sponsorships ===
The first merchandise produced in response to the growing popularity of the game was the baseball trading card. The earliest known player cards were produced in 1868 by a pair of New York baseball-equipment purveyors. Since that time, many enterprises, notably tobacco and candy companies, have used trading cards to promote and sell their products. These cards rarely, if ever, provided any benefit directly to the players, but a growing mania for collecting and trading cards helped personalize baseball, giving some fans a more personal connection to their favorite players and introducing them to new ones. Eventually, older cards became “vintage” and rare cards gained in value until the secondary market for trading cards became a billion-dollar industry in itself, with the rarest individuals bringing mid-six-figures to millions of dollars at auction. The advent of the Internet and websites such as eBay provided huge new venues for buyers, sellers and traders, some of whom have made baseball cards their living.

In recent years baseball cards have disassociated from unrelated products like tobacco and bubble-gum, to become products in their own right. Following the exit of competitor Donruss from the baseball-card industry, former bubble-gum giants Topps and Fleer came to dominate that market through exclusive contracts with players and Major League Baseball. Fleer, in turn, exited the market in 2007, leaving Topps as the only card manufacturer with an MLB contract.

Other genuine baseball memorabilia also trades and sells, often at high prices. Much of what is for sale as "memorabilia" is manufactured strictly for sale and rarely has a direct connection to teams or players beyond the labeling, unless signed in person by a player. Souvenir balls caught by fans during important games, especially significant home run balls, have great rarity value, and balls signed by players have always been treasured, traded and sold. The high value of autographs has created new businessmen whose sole means of making a living was acquiring autographs and memorabilia from the athletes. Memorabilia speculators fought with fans to get signatures worth $20, $60, or even $100 or more in their inventory.

Endorsement contracts are a significant source of income for top players, with their public profiles used to promote a range of products, including sports equipment, automobiles, beverages and clothing. Leading players may earn over one million dollars annually from such agreements.

In deals with players, teams and Major League Baseball, large corporations like NIKE and Champion pay big money to make sure that their logos are seen on the clothing and shoes worn by athletes on the field. This "association branding" has become a significant revenue stream. In the late 1990s and into the 21st century, the dugout, the backstops behind home plate, and anywhere else that might be seen by a camera, became fair game for the insertion of advertising.

=== Player wealth ===
Beginning with the 1972 Flood v. Kuhn Supreme Court case, management's grip on players, as embodied in the reserve clause, began to slip. In 1976, the Messersmith/McNally Arbitration, also known as the Seitz Decision effectively destroyed the reserve clause. Players who had been dramatically underpaid for generations came to be replaced by players who were paid extremely well for their services.

==== Sports agents ====
A new generation of sports agents arose, hawking the talents of free-agent players who knew baseball but did not know the business end of the game. The agents broke down what the teams were generating in revenue off of the players' performances. They calculated what their player might be worth to energize a television contract, or provide more merchandise revenue, or put more fans into stadium seats. Management pushed back; the dynamic produced a variety of compromises which possibly left all parties unsatisfied.

==== Business ====
Under the Major League Baseball contract, players must play for minimum salary for six years, at which time they become free agents. With players seeking greener pastures when their six years had passed, fewer players remained career members of one ball club. Large-market clubs like the New York Yankees, the Boston Red Sox, and the Los Angeles Dodgers, given big revenues from their cable television operations, signed more and more of the best—and best-known—players away from mid-sized and smaller-market clubs that could not afford to compete on salaries. Major League Baseball, unlike many other sports, does not impose a salary cap on teams. The League does attempt to level the field, as it were, by imposing a luxury tax on teams with very high payrolls, but management is still free to pay players whatever they can afford to attract talent. Some television reporters, commentators, and print sports writers question the kind of money being paid to these players, but just as many on the other side of the debate feel players should bargain for whatever they can get. Still others complain that minor-league players are not fairly compensated by MLB. The tug-of-war between players and management is complex, ongoing, and of great interest to serious students of the professional game.

=== Owners and players feud in the 1980s ===
All was not well with major league baseball. The many contractual disputes between players and owners came to a head in 1981. Previous players' strikes (in 1972, 1973 and 1980) had been held in preseason, with only the 1972 stoppage—over benefits—causing disruption to the regular season from April 1 to April 13, causing the cancellation of 86 games. Also, in 1976 the owners had locked the players out of spring training in a dispute over free agency.

The crux of the 1981 dispute was compensation for the loss of players to free agency. After seeing a top-rank player sign with another team, the aggrieved owner wanted a mid-rank player in return, the so-called sixteenth player (each club was allowed to protect 15 players from this rule). Under this arrangement, losing lower-rated free agents would produce correspondingly smaller compensation. While this seemed reasonable and fair to owners, players only recently freed from the bondage of the reserve clause found it unacceptable, and withdrew their labor, striking on June 12. Immediately, the U.S. Government's National Labor Relations Board ruled that the owners had not been negotiating in good faith, and installed a federal mediator to reach a solution. Seven weeks and 713 games were lost in the middle of the season, before the owners backed down on July 31, settling for proportionally lower-ranked players as compensation. The damaged season was continued as distinct halves starting August 9, with the playoffs reorganized to reflect this.

Throughout the 1980s then, baseball seemed to prosper. The competitive balance between franchises saw fifteen different teams make the World Series, and produced nine different champions during the decade. Also, every season from 1978 through 1987 saw a different World Series winner, a streak unprecedented in baseball history. Turmoil was, however, just around the corner. In 1986, Pete Rose retired from playing for the Cincinnati Reds, having broken Ty Cobb's record by accumulating 4,256 hits during his career. He continued as Reds manager until, in 1989 it was revealed that he was being investigated for sports gambling, including the possibility that he had bet on teams with which he was involved. While Rose admitted a gambling problem, he denied having bet on baseball. Federal prosecutor John Dowd investigated and, on his recommendation, Rose was banned from organised baseball, a move which precluded his possible inclusion in the Hall of Fame. In a meeting with Commissioner Giamatti, and having failed in a legal action to prevent it, Rose accepted his punishment. It was, essentially, the same fate that had befallen the Black Sox seventy years previously. (Rose, however, would continue to deny that he bet on baseball until he finally confessed to it in his 2004 autobiography.)

=== 1994–95 Major League Baseball strike ===
Labor relations were still strained. There had been a two-day strike in 1985 (over the division of television revenue money), and a 32-day spring training lockout in 1990 (again over salary structure and benefits). By far the worst action would come in 1994. The seeds were sown earlier: in 1992 the owners sought to renegotiate salary and free-agency terms, but little progress was made. The standoff continued until early 1994 when the existing agreement expired, with no agreement on what was to replace it. Adding to the conflict was the perception that "small market" teams, such as the struggling Seattle Mariners could not compete with high-spending teams such as those in New York or Los Angeles. Their plan was to institute TV revenue sharing to increase equity among the teams and impose a salary cap to keep expenditures down. Players felt that such a cap would reduce their potential earnings. It wasn't until later, in 2003, that MLB instituted a luxury tax on high-spending teams in an attempt to encourage more equitable player outlays.

Meanwhile, back in 1994, players officially went on strike on August 12. In September 1994, Major League Baseball announced the cancellation of the World Series for the first time since 1904.

=== Home run mania and the second coming of baseball ===
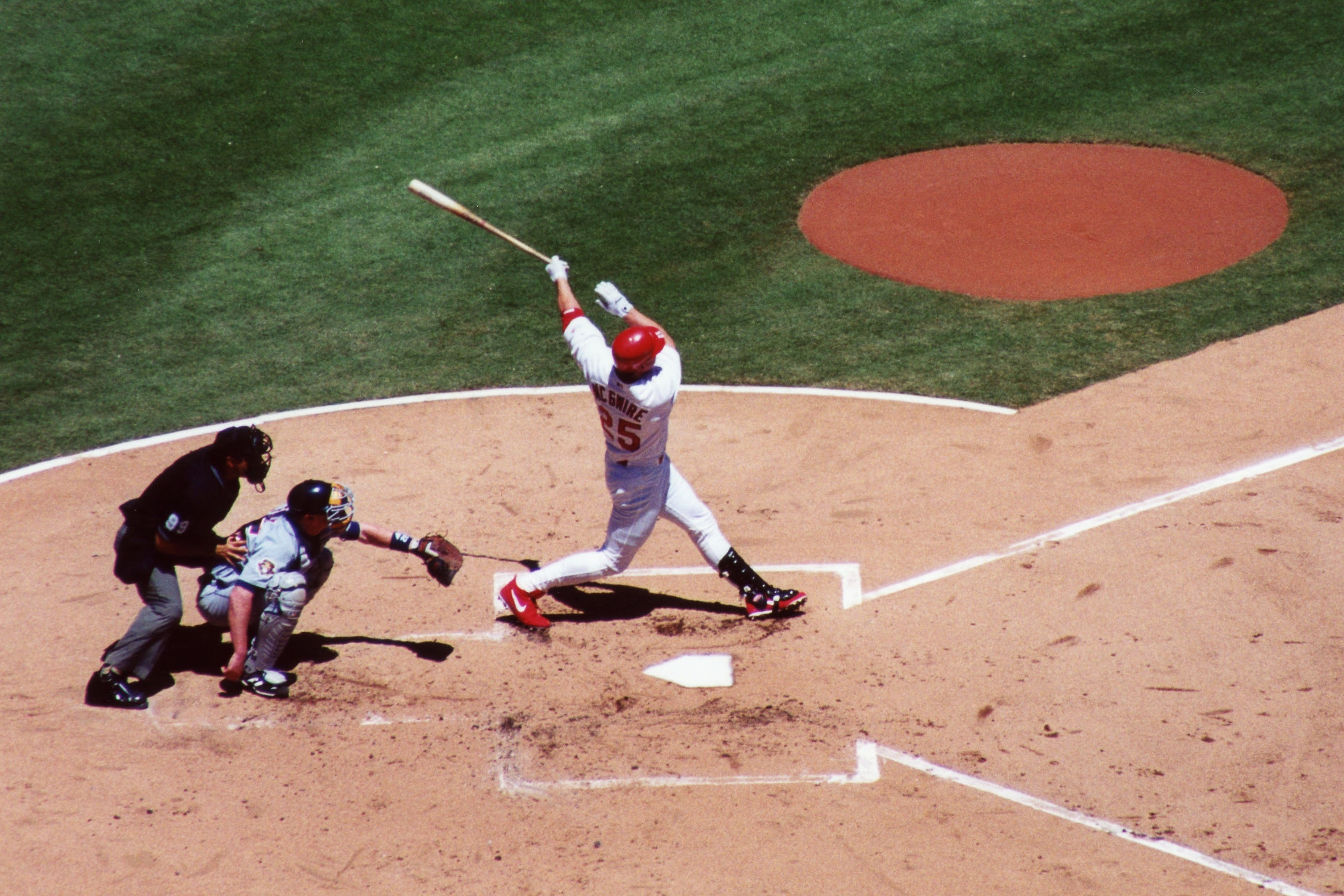
Mark McGwire hits a home run during his last Major League season in 2001

The cancellation of the 1994 World Series was a severe embarrassment for Major League Baseball. Fans were outraged and frustrated, their love of the game shaken to its core. The strike was declared an act of war, and fought back: attendance figures and broadcast ratings were lower in 1995 than before the strike. It would be a decade before baseball recovered from the disruption.

On September 6, 1995, Baltimore Orioles shortstop, Cal Ripken Jr., played his 2,131st consecutive game, breaking Lou Gehrig's 56-year-old record. This was the first celebratory moment in baseball after the strike. Ripken continued his streak for another three years, voluntarily ending it at 2,632 consecutive games played on September 20, 1998.

In 1997, the expansion Florida Marlins won the World Series in just their fifth season. This made them the third-youngest team to win the Fall Classic (behind the 1903 Boston Red Sox and later the 2001 Arizona Diamondbacks, who won in their fourth season). Virtually all the key players on the 1997 Marlins team were soon traded or let go to save payroll costs (although the 2003 Marlins did win a second world championship).

In 1998, St. Louis Cardinals first baseman Mark McGwire and Chicago Cubs outfielder Sammy Sosa engaged in a home run race for the ages. With both rapidly approaching Roger Maris's record of 61 home runs (set in 1961), the entire nation watched as the two power hitters raced to be the first to break into uncharted territory. McGwire reached 62 first on September 8, 1998, with Sosa right behind. Sosa finished the season with 66 home runs, well behind McGwire's unheard-of 70. However, recent steroid allegations have marred the season in the minds of many fans.

That same year, the New York Yankees won a record 125 games, including going 11–2 in the postseason, to win the World Series as what many consider to be one of the greatest teams of all time.

McGwire's record of 70 home runs would last a mere three years following the meteoric rise of veteran San Francisco Giants left fielder Barry Bonds in 2001. In 2001 Bonds knocked out 73 home runs, breaking the record set by McGwire by hitting his 71st on October 5, 2001. In addition to the home run record, Bonds also set single-season marks for base on balls with 177 (breaking the previous record of 170, set by Babe Ruth in 1923) and slugging percentage with .863 (breaking the mark of .847 set by Ruth in 1920). Bonds continued his torrid home run hitting in the next few seasons, hitting his 660th career home run on April 12, 2004, tying him with his godfather Willie Mays for third place on the all-time career home runs list. He hit his 661st home run the next day, April 13, to take sole possession of third place. Only three years later Bonds surpassed the great Hank Aaron to become baseball's most prolific home run hitter.

However, none of Bonds's accomplishments in the 2000s have been without controversy. During his run, journalists questioned McGwire about his use of the steroid-precursor androstenedione, and in March 2005 he was unforthcoming when questioned as part of a Congressional inquiry into steroids. Bonds has also been dogged by allegations of steroid use and his involvement in the BALCO drugs scandal, as his personal trainer Greg Anderson pleaded guilty to supplying steroids (without naming Bonds as a recipient). Neither Bonds nor McGwire has failed a drug test at any time since there was no steroid-testing until 2003 after the new August 7, 2002, agreement between owners and players was reached. McGwire retired after the 2001 season; in 2010, he admitted to having used steroids throughout his MLB career.

The 1990s also saw Major League Baseball expand into new markets as four new teams joined the league. In 1993, the Colorado Rockies and Florida Marlins began play, and in just their fifth year of existence, the Marlins became the first wild card team to win the championship.

The year 1998 brought two more teams into the mix, the Tampa Bay Devil Rays and the Arizona Diamondbacks, the latter of which become the youngest expansion franchise to win the championship.

The late 1990s were dominated by the New York Yankees, who won four out of five World Series championships from 1996 to 2000.

== The steroid era ==
=== Drugs, baseball, and records ===
The lure of big money pushed players harder and harder to achieve peak performance, while avoiding injury from over-training. The wearying travel schedule and 162-game season meant that amphetamines, usually in the form of pep pills known as "greenies", had been widespread in baseball since at least the 1960s. Baseball's drug scene was no particular secret, having been discussed in Sports Illustrated and in Jim Bouton's groundbreaking book Ball Four, but there was virtually no public backlash. Two decades later, however, some Major League players turned to newer performance-enhancing drugs, including ephedra and improved steroids. The eventual consequences for the game, the players and the fans were substantial.

A memo circulated in 1991 by baseball commissioner Fay Vincent stated that "The possession, sale or use of any illegal drug or controlled substance by Major League players and personnel is strictly prohibited ... [and those players involved] are subject to discipline by the commissioner and risk permanent expulsion from the game.... This prohibition applies to all illegal drugs and controlled substances, including steroids…" Some general managers of the time do not remember this memo; it was not emphasized or enforced and, confusingly, Vincent himself has disclaimed any direct responsibility for a ban on steroids, saying, "I didn't ban steroids...They were banned by Congress".

The 1998 home run race had generated nearly unbroken positive publicity, but Barry Bonds' run for the all-time home run record provoked a backlash over steroids, which increase a person's testosterone level and subsequently enable that person to bodybuild with much more ease. Some athletes have said that the main advantage to steroids is not so much the additional power or endurance that they can provide, but that they can drastically shorten rehab time from injury.

Commissioner Bud Selig was criticized, mostly after-the-fact, for a slow response to the rising tide of steroid use in the 1990s. In the early 2000s, as a safe and effective test for anabolic steroids came online and sanctions for their use began to be strictly enforced, some players adopted the use of harder-to-detect human growth hormone (HGH) to increase stamina and strength. Selig, still acting with some caution, imposed a strict anti-drug policy upon its minor league players, who are not part of the Major League Baseball Players Association (the PA). Random drug testing, education and treatment, and strict penalties for those caught became the rule of law. Anyone on a Major League team's forty man roster, including 15 minor leaguers that are on that list, were exempt from that program. Eventually, Selig and MLB had strict rules in place that carried meaningful sanctions against players who "juiced."

In a Sports Illustrated cover story in 2002, a year after his retirement, Ken Caminiti admitted that he had used steroids during his National League MVP-winning 1996 season, and for several seasons afterwards. Caminiti died unexpectedly of an apparent heart attack in The Bronx at the age of 41; he was pronounced dead on October 10, 2004, at New York's Lincoln Memorial Hospital. On November 1, the New York City Medical Examiners Office announced that Caminiti died from "acute intoxication due to the combined effects of cocaine and opiates", but possibly-steroid-induced coronary artery disease and cardiac hypertrophy (an enlarged heart) were also contributing factors.

Ephedra, a herb used to cure cold symptoms, and also used in some allergy medications, sped up the heart and was considered by some to be a weight-loss short-cut. In 2003, Baltimore Orioles pitcher Steve Bechler had come to training camp 10 pounds overweight. During a workout on February 16, Bechler complained of dizziness and fatigue. His condition worsened while resting in the clubhouse and he was transported to an ambulance on a stretcher. Bechler spent the night in intensive care and died the following morning at the age of 23. The official cause of death was listed as "multi-organ failure due to heat exhaustion". The coroner's report stated it was likely that Bechler had taken three ephedra capsules on an empty stomach prior to working out. Many in the media linked Bechler's death to ephedra, raising concerns over the use of performance-enhancing drugs in baseball. Ephedra was banned, and soon the furor died down.

In 2005, Jose Canseco published Juiced: Wild Times, Rampant 'Roids, Smash Hits & How Baseball Got Big, admitting steroid usage and claiming that it was prevalent throughout major league baseball. When the United States Congress decided to investigate the use of steroids in the sport, some of the game's most prominent players came under scrutiny for possibly using steroids. These include Barry Bonds, Jason Giambi, and Mark McGwire. Other players, such as Canseco and Gary Sheffield, have admitted to have either knowingly (in Canseco's case) or not (Sheffield's) using steroids. In confidential testimony to the BALCO Grand Jury (that was later leaked to the San Francisco Chronicle), Giambi also admitted steroid use. He later held a press conference in which he appeared to affirm this admission, without actually saying the words. And after an appearance before Congress where he (unlike McGwire) emphatically denied using steroids, "period", slugger Rafael Palmeiro became the first major star to be suspended (10 days) on August 1, 2005, for violating Major League Baseball's newly strengthened ban on controlled substances, including steroids, adopted on August 7, 2002, starting in the 2003 season. Many lesser players (mostly from the minor leagues) have tested positive for use, as well.

In 2006, Commissioner Selig tasked former United States Senator George J. Mitchell to lead an investigation into the use of performance-enhancing drugs in Major League Baseball (MLB) and on December 13, 2007, the 409-page Mitchell Report was released ('Report to the Commissioner of Baseball of an Independent Investigation into the Illegal Use of Steroids and Other Performance Enhancing Substances by Players in Major League Baseball'). The report described the use of anabolic steroids and human growth hormone (HGH) in MLB and assessed the effectiveness of the MLB Joint Drug Prevention and Treatment Program. Mitchell also advanced certain recommendations regarding the handling of past illegal drug use and future prevention practices. The report names 89 MLB players who are alleged to have used steroids or drugs.

Baseball has been taken to task for turning a blind eye to its drug problems. It benefited from these drugs in the ever-increasingly competitive fight for airtime and media attention. For example, Commissioner Selig sent a personal representative to the 2007 game where Barry Bonds broke Hank Aaron's career home run record, even though Bonds was widely believed at the time to be a steroid user and had been named in connection with the then-ongoing BALCO scandal; many viewed this as Selig giving wink-and-a-nod tacit approval to the use of PEDs. MLB and its Players Association finally announced tougher measures, but many felt that they did not go far enough.

In December 2009, Sports Illustrated named Baseball's Steroid Scandal as the number one sports story of the decade of the 2000s. In 2013, no player from the first "steroid class" of players eligible for the Baseball Hall of Fame was elected. Bonds and Clemens received less than half the number of votes needed, and some voters stated that they would not vote for any first-time candidate who played during the steroid era—whether accused of using banned substances or not—because of the effect the substances had on baseball.

=== The BALCO steroids scandal ===
In 2002, a major scandal arose when it was discovered that the company Bay Area Laboratory Co-operative (BALCO), owned by Victor Conte, had been producing so-called "designer steroids", (specifically "the clear" and "the cream") which are steroids that could not be detected through drug tests at that time. In addition, the company had connections to several San Francisco Bay Area sports trainers and athletes, including the trainers of Jason Giambi and Barry Bonds. This revelation led to a vast criminal investigation into BALCO's connections with athletes from baseball and many other sports. Among the many athletes who have been linked to BALCO are Olympic sprinters Tim Montgomery and Marion Jones, Olympic shot-putter C. J. Hunter, as well as Giambi and Bonds.

Grand jury testimony in December 2003—which was illegally leaked to the San Francisco Chronicle and published in December 2004 under the bylines of Mark Fainaru-Wada and Lance Williams—revealed that the Bay Area Laboratory Cooperative did not merely manufacture nutritional supplements, but also distributed exotic steroids. Williams and Fairanu-Wada also provided compelling evidence that Barry Bonds, arguably the greatest player of his generation, was one of BALCO's steroid clients. The paper reported that these substances were probably designer steroids. Bonds said that Greg Anderson gave him a rubbing balm and a liquid substance that at the time he did not believe them to be steroids and thought they were flaxseed oil and other health supplements. Based on the testimony from many of the athletes, Conte and Anderson accepted plea agreements from the government in 2005, on charges they distributed steroids and laundered money, in order to avoid significant time in jail. Conte received a sentence of four months, Anderson received a sentence of three months. Also that year, James Valente, the vice-president of BALCO, and Remi Korchemny, a track coach affiliated with BALCO, pled guilty to distributing banned substances and received probation.

Various baseball pundits, fans, and even players have taken this as confirmation that Bonds used illegal steroids. Bonds never tested positive in tests performed in 2003, 2004, and 2005, which may be attributable to successful obfuscation of continued use as documented in the 2006 book Game of Shadows. Before-and-after photos of Bonds, early in his career and late in his career, have led most fans to conclude that he must have used steroids to achieve such startling changes in his physique.

=== The Power Age ===
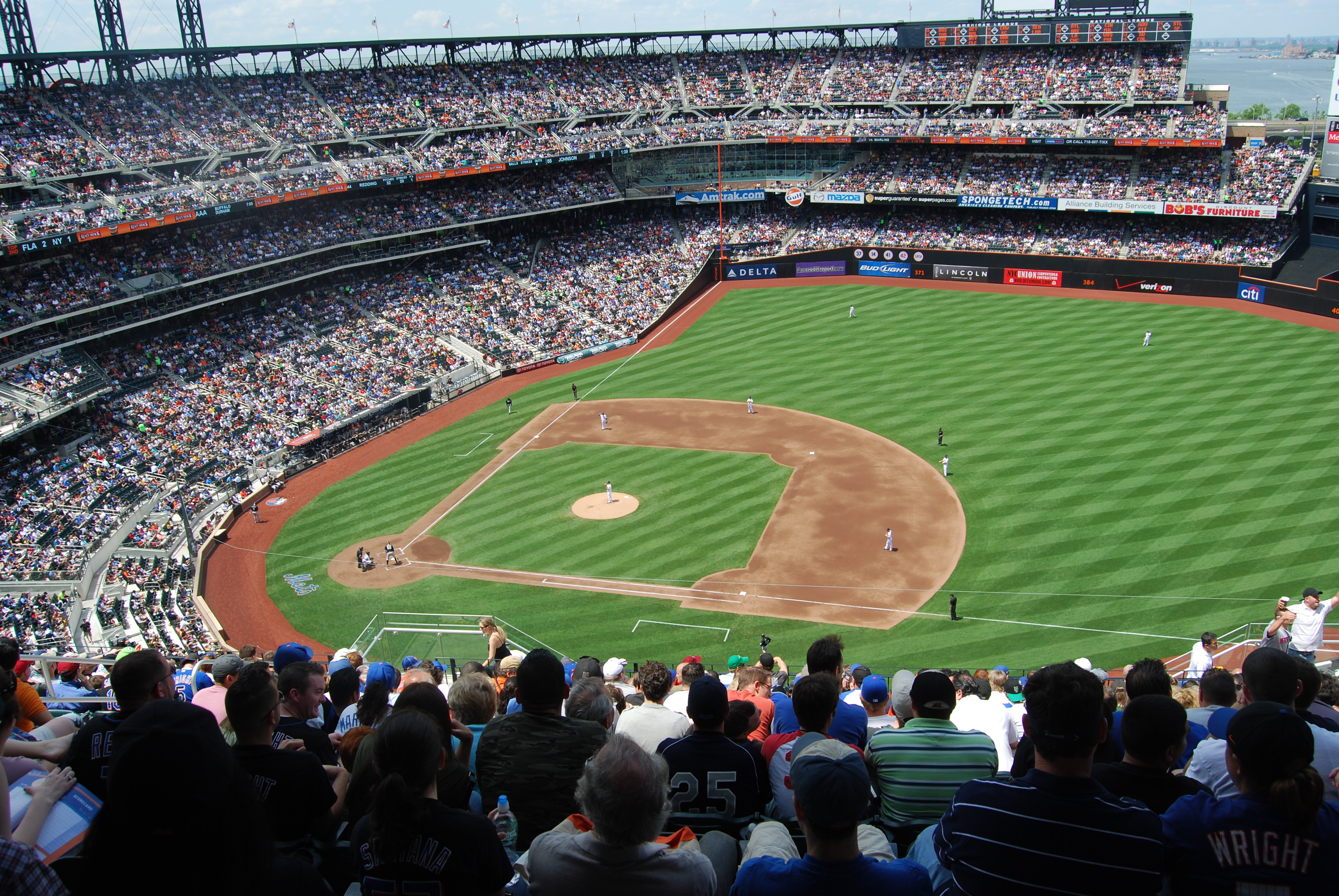
To meet the Power Age, Citi Field in New York was built to favor teams built on pitching, defense, and speed.

While the introduction of steroids certainly increased the power production of greats, there were other factors that drastically increased the power surge after 1994. The factors cited are: smaller sized ballparks than in the past, the "juiced balls" theory claiming that the balls are wound tighter thus travel further following contact with the bat, and "watered down pitching" implying that lesser quality pitchers are up in the Major Leagues due to too many teams. Albeit these factors did play a large role in increasing home run thus scoring totals during this time, others that directly impact ballplayers have an equally important role. As noted earlier, one of those factors is the use of anabolic steroids for increasing muscle mass, which enables hitters to not only hit "mistake" pitches farther, but it also confers faster bat speed, giving hitters a fraction of a second more to adjust to "good" pitches such as a well-placed fastball, slider, changeup, or curveball. A more innocent, but also meaningful factor is better nutrition, as well as scientific training methods and advanced training facilities/equipment which can work without steroids to produce a more potent ballplayer.

In today's baseball age, players routinely reach 40 and 50 home runs in a season, a feat that was rare as recently as the 1980s. On the other hand, since the end of the steroid era, the emphasis on swinging for home runs has been accompanied by hitting in general falling off, with batting averages trending downwards towards 1960s levels and strikeouts reaching all-time highs: each of the eleven seasons from 2006 through 2016 broke the preceding MLB-total record for strikeouts.

Many modern baseball theorists believe that a new pitch will swing the balance of power back to the pitcher. A pitching revolution would not be unprecedented—several pitches have changed the game of baseball in the past, including the slider in the 1950s and 1960s and the split-fingered fastball in the 1970s to 1990s. Since the 1990s, the changeup has made a resurgence, being thrown masterfully by pitchers such as Tim Lincecum, Pedro Martínez, Trevor Hoffman, Greg Maddux, Matt Cain, Tom Glavine, Johan Santana, Marco Estrada, Justin Verlander, and Cole Hamels. Every so often, the time-honored knuckleball puts in another appearance to bedevil batters; pitchers like Phil Niekro, Jesse Haines, and Hoyt Wilhelm have made the Hall of Fame throwing knuckleballs.

== Popularity in recent decades ==
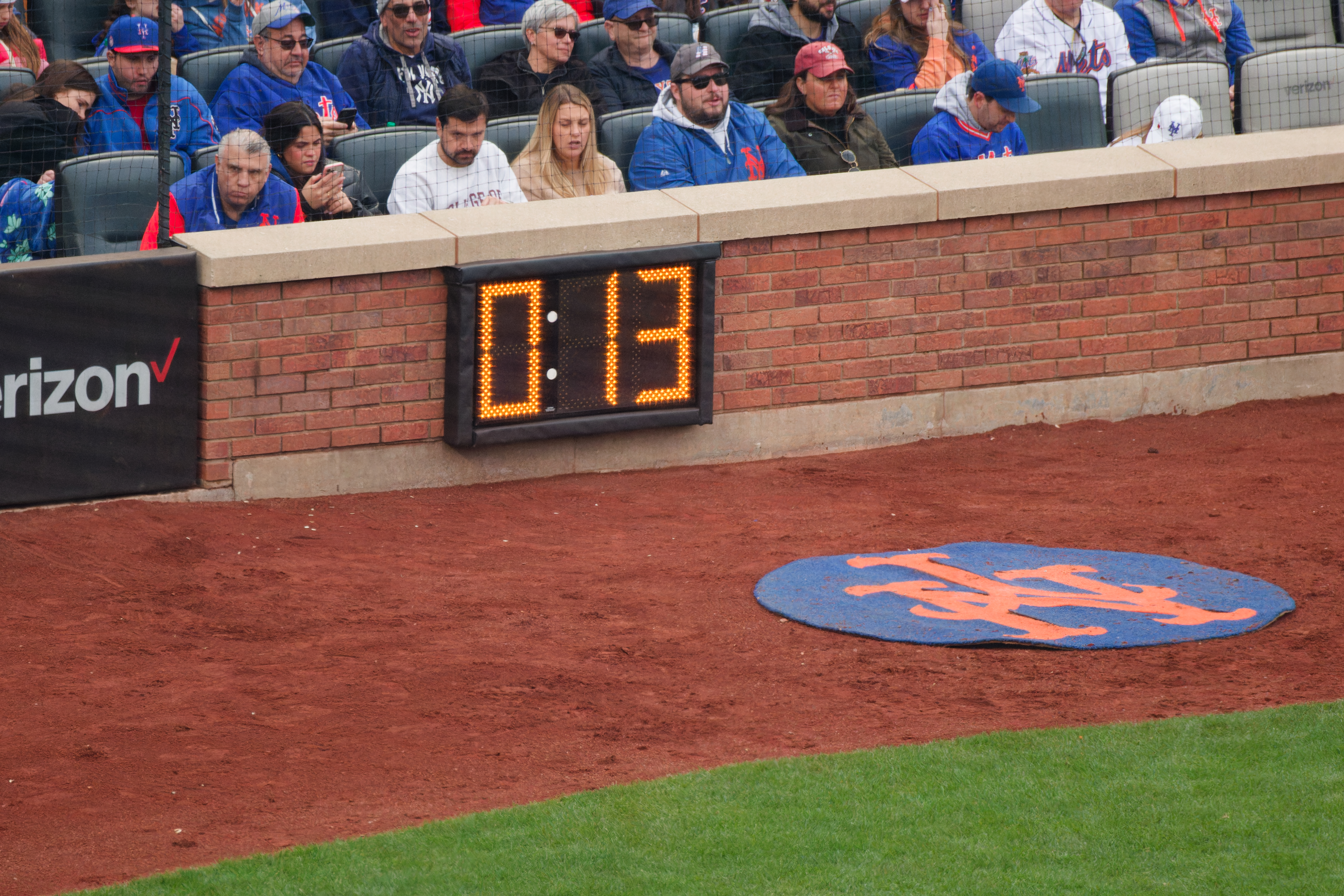
The MLB pitch clock, which counts down from a maximum of 18 seconds.

Baseball declined in popularity throughout the turn of the 21st century as other sports grew with the help of television broadcasting. Another factor in baseball's decline is that MLB games ended up being about 30 minutes longer on average since the 1960s. To combat this problem, MLB instituted the pitch clock, which forces pitchers to throw within a given time limit, in 2023 to make games end quicker. 62% of fans expressed support for the change during that year's season.

Banana Ball, an exhibition-style professional baseball league, has also made modifications to baseball to speed up the game, and has seen rising popularity as well.

== Summary of modern-era major league teams ==
Note: The team names listed below are those currently in use. Some of the franchises have changed their names in the past, in some cases more than once. In the early years of the 20th century, many teams did not have official names, and were referred to by their league and city, or by nicknames created by sportswriters.

- 1876 – National League is established
- 1900 – National League "Classic Eight" lineup of teams is established: Chicago Cubs, Boston Braves, Brooklyn Dodgers, New York Giants, Philadelphia Phillies, Pittsburgh Pirates, Cincinnati Reds, and St. Louis Cardinals
- 1901 – American League is established with eight teams: Boston Red Sox, Chicago White Sox, Cleveland Guardians, Detroit Tigers, Philadelphia Athletics, Washington Senators, Milwaukee Brewers, and Baltimore Orioles
- 1902 – Milwaukee Brewers move to St. Louis and become the Browns
- 1903 – Baltimore Orioles move to New York and become the Yankees
- 1953 – Boston Braves move to Milwaukee
- 1954 – St. Louis Browns move to Baltimore and become the Orioles
- 1955 – Philadelphia Athletics move to Kansas City
- 1958 – New York Giants move to San Francisco; Brooklyn Dodgers move to Los Angeles
- 1961 – Washington Senators move to Minneapolis–Saint Paul and become the Minnesota Twins; new Washington Senators (AL) and Los Angeles Angels (AL) created as expansion teams
- 1962 – Houston Astros (NL) and New York Mets (NL) created as expansion teams
- 1966 – Milwaukee Braves move to Atlanta
- 1968 – Kansas City Athletics move to Oakland
- 1969 – San Diego Padres (NL), Montreal Expos (NL), Kansas City Royals (AL), and Seattle Pilots (AL) created as expansion teams
- 1970 – Seattle Pilots move to Milwaukee and become the Brewers
- 1972 – Washington Senators move to Dallas–Fort Worth and become the Texas Rangers
- 1977 – Seattle Mariners (AL) and Toronto Blue Jays (AL) created as expansion teams
- 1993 – Colorado Rockies (NL) and Miami Marlins (NL) created as expansion teams
- 1998 – Arizona Diamondbacks (NL) and Tampa Bay Rays (AL) created as expansion teams; Milwaukee Brewers switch from AL to NL
- 2005 – Montreal Expos move to Washington and become the Nationals
- 2013 – Houston Astros switch from NL to AL
- 2025 – Oakland Athletics move to Sacramento

== See also ==
- Fantography
- Timeline of Major League Baseball
- History of baseball outside the United States
- Variations of baseball#History
