= Fantography =

Sports photography social media platform

Fantography is a web-based social media project that provides a forum for baseball fans to view, share and discuss their amateur photographs of baseball scenes and baseball players. The website fantography.net was founded by former San Diego Padres executive and current Acme Sports Marketing president Andy Strasberg, whose inspiration came in part from a 1960s photo of himself as a teenager at Yankee Stadium with his idol Roger Maris. There are two established guidelines for Fantography submissions: first, player images must not be in an action-shot format, and second, all images must have been taken by amateur photographers rather than professionals.

So far, Strasberg has collected (or "harvested" in Fantography parlance) more than 6,000 photos that span the 1930s up through today, including a cigar-smoking Babe Ruth in street clothes with his daughter, an on-field Howard Cosell interviewing pitcher Vida Blue, and a mid-autograph Roberto Clemente peering up to meet the camera's lens. One contributing "Fantographer" is well-known sportscaster and political pundit Keith Olbermann. A touring exhibit of the Fantography collection has shown in San Diego, CA, and Tucson, AZ, as well as at Kentucky's Louisville Slugger Museum & Factory and the Baseball Hall of Fame and Museum in Cooperstown, NY. Ultimately, Strasberg intends to publish the best Fantography submissions in a coffee table book.
