= 1869 in sports =

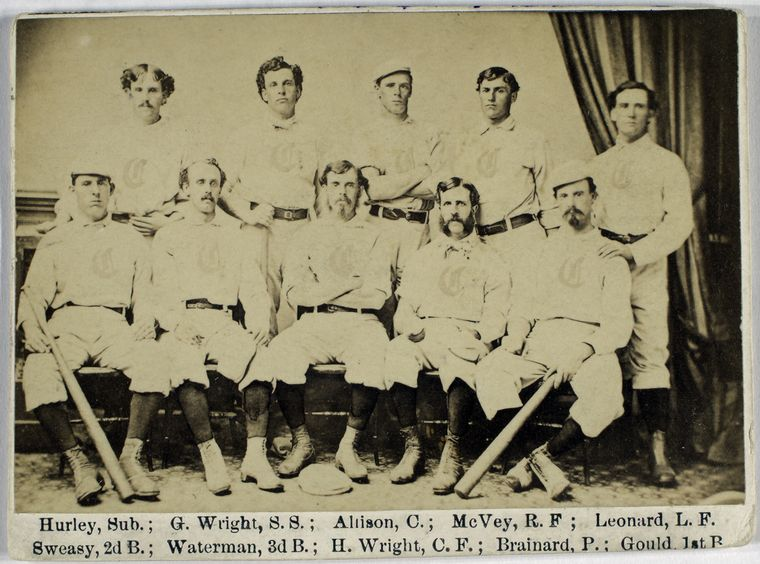
1869 Cincinnati Red Stockings baseball team

1869 in sports describes the year's events in world sport.

== American football ==
=== College championship ===
- College football national championship – Princeton Tigers

=== Events ===
- 6 November — the first American intercollegiate football game is played, between Princeton Tigers and Rutgers Scarlet Knights, although the rules are closer to modern Association football (soccer). Rutgers wins by 6 "runs" to 4.
- A second game is played a week later at Princeton who win this 8–0.

== Baseball ==
=== Events ===
- The Cincinnati Red Stockings became the first all-professional team in baseball with ten salaried players.

== Boxing ==
=== Events ===
- 15 June — Mike McCoole defeats British challenger Tom Allen on a ninth round disqualification near St. Louis, Missouri. McCoole continues to claim the disputed American Championship but his main rival Jimmy Elliott is inactive this year.
- Future champion Allen is the most active fighter in 1869. Besides losing to McCoole, he defeats Bill Davis in the 43rd round; and has two fights against Charley Gallagher, losing the first in the second round and drawing the rematch. Meanwhile, the last English Champion Jem Mace is touring America and giving sparring exhibitions only.

== Canadian Football ==
- The Hamilton Football Club is founded, the oldest professional canadian football club. It eventually merged with the Hamilton Wildcats in 1950 to form the Hamilton Tiger-Cats.

== Cricket ==
=== Events ===
- The demise of the original Cambridgeshire County Cricket Club, which had played first-class cricket since 1819. A team called Cambridgeshire will be formed to play in two specially arranged matches, one in 1869 v. Yorkshire and one in 1871 v. Surrey. After that, Cambridgeshire will cease to be a first-class team.

=== England ===
- Most runs – W. G. Grace 1,320 @ 57.39 (HS 180)
- Most wickets – James Southerton 136 @ 15.36 (BB 8–68)

== Golf ==
=== Major tournaments ===
- British Open – Tom Morris junior

== Horse racing ==
=== England ===
- Grand National – The Colonel (first of two consecutive wins)
- 1,000 Guineas Stakes – Scottish Queen
- 2,000 Guineas Stakes – Pretender
- The Derby – Pretender
- The Oaks – Brigantine
- St. Leger Stakes – Pero Gomez

=== Australia ===
- Melbourne Cup – Warrior

=== Canada ===
- Queen's Plate – Bay Jack

=== Ireland ===
- Irish Derby Stakes – The Scout

=== USA ===
- Belmont Stakes – Fenian

== Rowing ==
=== The Boat Race ===
- 17 March — Oxford wins the 26th Oxford and Cambridge Boat Race

== Rugby football ==
=== Events ===
- Sydney University Football Club forms the first football club in Australia, playing Rugby rules.
- Foundation of Preston Grasshoppers
