= Brooklyn Enterprise =

Defunct baseball team in New York

The Enterprise Base Ball Club of Brooklyn

Information
- League: National Amateur Association (1861–1866)
- Location: Brooklyn, New York
- Founded: June 28, 1856
- Folded: 1866
- Nickname: Brooklyn Enterprise
- Former ballpark(s): various Brooklyn locales (1856–1863); Capitoline Grounds (1864–1866)

The Enterprise Base Ball Club of Brooklyn (also known as the Enterprise of Bedford) was an American baseball club in the 1850s and 1860s.

== Founding ==
The Enterprise was founded as an amateur club on June 28, 1856, in the neighborhood of Bedford, in Brooklyn, New York. At the time, baseball (then spelled as two words—"base ball") was strictly a non-professional sport, played for recreation and exercise. There were no organized leagues, and rules varied by region as there were as yet no agreed-upon standards of play.

Shortly after the club was founded, the New York Clipper described the Enterprise Club (as well as the Star Club of South Brooklyn) as "youths ranging from 15 to 18 years of age, who have organized, like thousands of others, for the purpose of perfecting themselves in the various physical exercises, which are so necessary for a development of the mental faculties."

By contemporaneous journalistic accounts, in their first five seasons, the Enterprise were considered an elite "Junior" class squad. "Junior" clubs generally consisted of younger, less experienced, but often highly competitive players, the best of whom might be recruited by Senior clubs.

The Enterprise were competitive enough to challenge Senior clubs, but often the challenges were not accepted. "We understand that the Enterprise club have challenged several of our leading clubs who have not responded as it was expected they would," according to the Brooklyn Daily Eagle. "Don't be afraid of the boys[,] gentlemen, but come out boldly and play them even if there is a chance of your being defeated. Those who back out will certainly merit the white feather for an ornament."

There was an explosive growth of the game regionally and nationally in the late 1850s. In 1860, the National Association of Base Ball Players (NABBP), which served to legitimize, standardize, and popularize the game, admitted 21 new teams to its ranks, including the Enterprise. "Each new entry was required to pay a $5 admission fee and agree to pay annual dues of $5," wrote baseball historian William Ryczek. "Of the new clubs, 13 were from New York state, but the presence of eight from other states was encouraging." Upon admission to the NABBP, the Enterprise began the 1861 season officially recognized as a Senior club.

== Quality of play ==
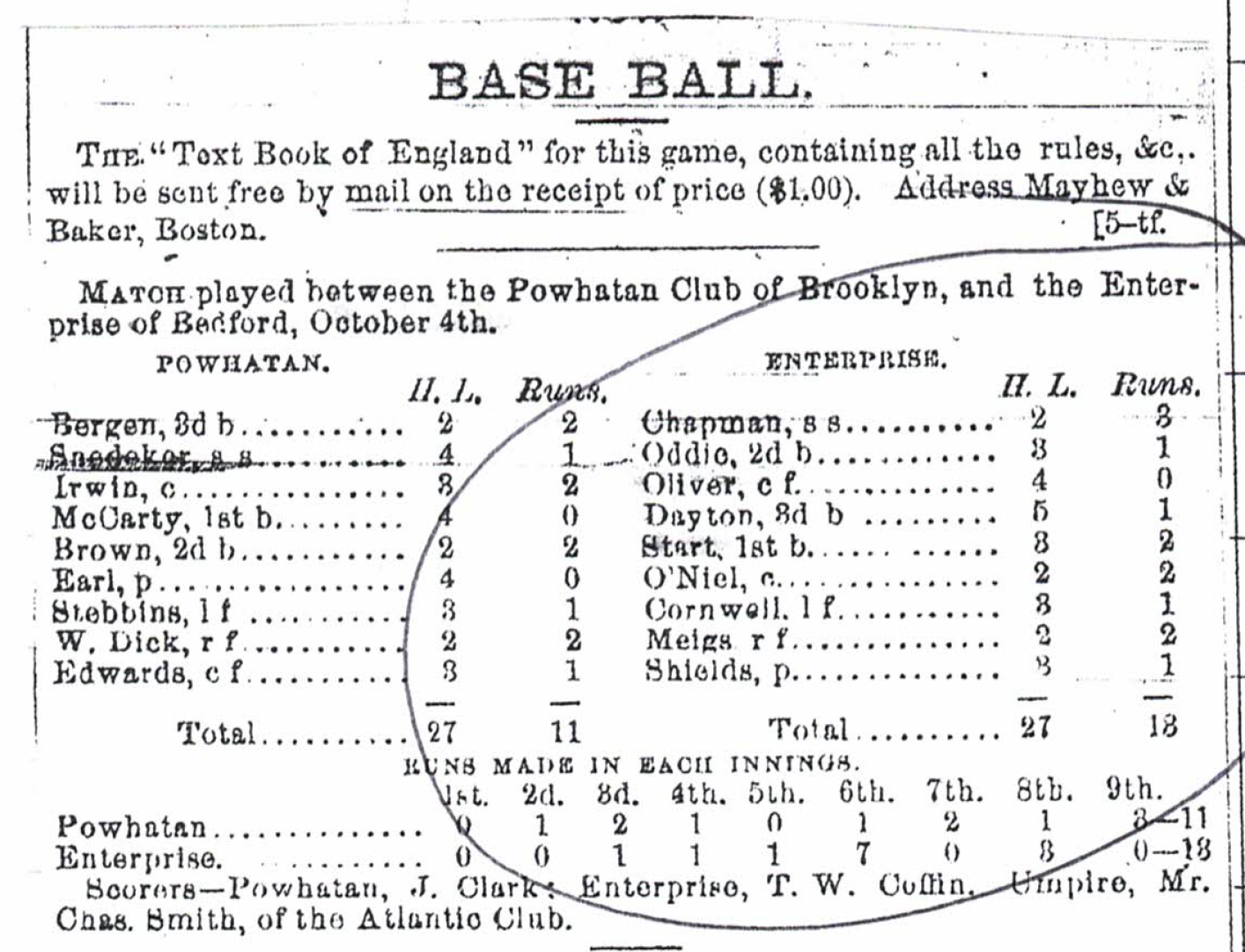
Box score of Enterprise vs. Powhatan match published in Wilkes Spirit of the Times newspaper, October 15, 1859

"Any one who witnessed the [May 28, 1858] game [between the Star Club of Brooklyn and the Enterprise Club of Brooklyn] will admit that of all Junior clubs, they rank highest," reported Porter's Spirit of the Times. "It was played by both sides as finely, and as many excellent points were made, as will be seen in almost any match of the Senior players. ... We shall watch with much interest the future games of these clubs, and advise those who wish to witness much pretty play, to be present at whatever game they may participate in."

The Enterprise was considered an excellent source of talented young players, who were then recruited by more high-profile clubs. According to the New York Clipper, reporting in 1860, "The Enterprise and Star were the leading junior organizations up to 1859, when both entered the [NABBP]. Last season the Stars took a decided lead, being much stronger than the Enterprise; but this season, judging from the play of the respective clubs thus far, we are inclined to award the palm to the Enterprise club. ... [The two clubs] have been rivals since their organization, the Enterprise club practicing on the same grounds as the Atlantics, and the Stars, up to this season, on that of the Excelsior Club, both the Atlantics and Excelsiors being at times recruited from these junior clubs."

After a close loss to the Senior class Brooklyn Atlantics in 1860, the Brooklyn Daily Eagle commended the Junior club, noting, "The Enterprise players have learned the value and importance of proper discipline in their nine, and for a young club they are remarkably well organized in this respect, and it is in this that they have an advantage over the Atlantic's [sic], who this season has been lacking in this very necessary matter."

== Home field ==
The concept of a one-team "home field" did not exist in the early days of the sport. Amateur era clubs had "home" playing grounds—such as parks, public recreation areas, or vacant lots—although they were often shared with other teams and other sports (particularly cricket).

According to the New York Clipper in May 1862, "The members of [the Atlantic Club] commenced play for the season [on May 12], the late date of their opening game resulting from their having their grounds newly laid out, which has been done under the superintendence of Mr. Wild. The ground is now one of the best of the city, and in a few weeks will be in fine condition. These grounds are occupied by the Atlantics on Mondays and Thursdays, and by the Enterprise club on Wednesdays and Saturdays." The Clipper added, "There are, therefore, two days each week unoccupied, and these days can be secured on application to Mr. Wild, at the Cline Hill Hotel, corner of Gates and Marcey Avenue." (Sunday ball was prohibited by law.)

In the 1860s, fenced-in parks, such as the Union Grounds (1862) and the Capitoline Grounds (1864), began hosting competitive sports matches. From 1864 to 1866, the Enterprise shared Brooklyn's lavish, multi-purpose Capitoline Grounds as their home field. In May, 1865, the New York Times reported, "The Capitoline grounds ... are to be the locale of some of the most interesting and exciting games of the season. Three ball clubs—the Atlantic, Excelsior and Enterprise—and one cricket Club—the Long Island—occupying it this year. A new clubhouse has been erected, costing several thousand dollars, and ample preparations have been made for the accommodation of the fair sex. In fact it is to be the popular resort of the ball-playing fraternity and their fair guests of the Western District of Brooklyn."

That did not mean that all playing fields were conducive to serious ball-playing. The Brooklyn Daily Eagle, covering a game between the Enterprise and the Star Club in June 1865, described the Star Grounds, opposite Carroll Park, as a "vacant lot with cobble-stone paved streets on three sides, and the lot a stony and sterile waste, [which] forms what are here called ball grounds—and no man can be expected to make much headway with spikes, on pavement. But this is the best ground South Brooklyn affords, and of course players must make allowances for that."

== Historical record ==
To date more than 85 games played by the Enterprise have been documented. Records were not kept for an unknown number of games; for others, records were lost, or research has yet to turn up specific details. Some games were documented in Charles Peverelly's Book of American Pastimes, which was self-published in 1866. Other Enterprise matches have been documented at Protoball.org, a clearinghouse of information about pre-professional baseball. Enterprise game chronicles have been located in the archives of such New York-based newspapers as The New York Clipper, The Brooklyn Eagle, Porter's Spirit of the Times, Wilkes Spirit of the Times, The New York Times, The New York Daily Herald, and others.

After the 1861 season, a number of key Enterprise regulars, including first baseman Joe Start and outfielders Jack Chapman and Fred Crane, left the team and joined the rival Brooklyn Atlantics. This caused a rift between the clubs. "[T]he Enterprise ... had shared a field with and been mentored by the Atlantics in the 1850s while the Enterprise was still a junior club," wrote historians Craig Waff and William Ryczek. "But the latter was now a senior club, and the Atlantics' raid of three ... Enterprise players (in addition to Charley Smith in 1858) permanently soured the Atlantic–Enterprise relationship. The two clubs would not play against each other again."

Though the Enterprise played a busy schedule in 1861, many teams began to scale back games that year, a process that continued through 1863, as many young, able-bodied males were recruited to fight in the American Civil War. Only one 1862 game played by the Enterprise has been documented, and none for 1863.

Scoring totals in Enterprise matches, and in all contemporary games, were dramatically higher than in late 19th century thru today. Baseball historian Bruce Allardice said scoring in early games was "reminiscent of softball scores—which should not be surprising, since 1858–65 baseball resembled modern softball as much as it resembled modern baseball." MLB historian John Thorn noted that "baseball games of the 1860s typically featured 35 or more combined runs per game, with scores of 60–100 runs not unusual." Runs scored per game in baseball matches decreased starting in the 1870s as a result of rules changes, craftier pitching, improved fielding, and changes in equipment.

In 1865 the Enterprise played eleven documented games, losing ten, to finish with a dismal 1–10 record. "The poor results had pushed [team captain W.H.] Murtha toward a tactic on September 3 which fell many a captain in the 1860s: the rotating of first-nine players to unfamiliar positions in the field. Clubs in the 1860s did not have many capable substitutes in their second nines. If a captain wanted to shake things up, his only option was to switch around his defense." Unfortunately, most switched position players performed ineptly on the field, compounding the Enterprise losses.

No matches involving the Enterprise have been documented beyond 1866. In April 1867, the Brooklyn Daily Eagle, in a brief item about a former Enterprise player named Smith who would be playing for the National Club of Washington that year, referred to the Enterprise as "defunct." According to at least one authoritative historical chronicle, the Enterprise merged with the Excelsior Club in late 1866, and continuing under the name Excelsior fielded a competitive team in 1867.

== Legacy ==
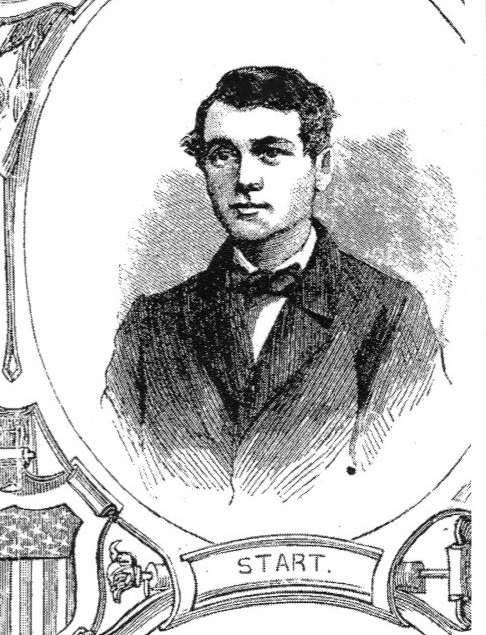
Joe Start, 1865, then with the Brooklyn Atlantics

Several players on the Enterprise later went on to extended careers playing professionally in the National Association and the National League. One was historically pivotal in establishing how his field position would thereafter be played: first baseman Joe Start (although Start is listed in many news accounts as playing third base for the Enterprise). Start had a 27-year career of sustained excellence through 1886, playing professionally with the Atlantic for a decade, then playing 16 years in the Major Leagues.

The team name "Enterprise" became common, with similarly named (but unrelated) squads in Memphis (1866), Peoria (1867), Newark (1860), Jersey City (1859), Sidney (1866), Middleport (1868), Pittsburgh (1866), Allegheny (PA), Baltimore, Chicago, Troy (New York), and elsewhere. However, the Brooklyn team is the earliest known to adopt the name.

== Significant Enterprise players ==
Newspaper coverage of amateur-era games generally mentioned only last names in stories, and players were similarly listed in box scores. Hence, the identities of most Enterprise players are unknown. The following players had established careers after leaving the Enterprise:

- Jack "Death to Flying Things" Chapman
- Fred Crane
- Bob "Death to Flying Things" Ferguson
- George Hall
- William H. Murtha
- Charley Smith
- Joseph E. Sprague
- Joe Start

== Documented games ==
Date	Opponent	Score	Win/loss/tie	Location
September 18, 1856	Excelsior Club	unknown	unknown	Brooklyn
October 3, 1856	National Club	24–8	Win	Brooklyn (Bedford)
November 15, 1856	Star Club of Brooklyn	21–16	Loss	Brooklyn (Bedford)
November 20, 1856	Star Club of Brooklyn	22–8	Loss	unknown
November 20, 1856	National Club	24–12	Win	unknown
unknown (spring)	Ashland	unknown	Win	unknown
August 1, 1857	Lone Star Club of Jersey City	24–27	Loss	Brooklyn
August 22, 1857	Excelsior Club	51–12	Win	Brooklyn (Wheat Hill)
September 26, 1857	Star Club of Brooklyn	14–19	Loss	Brooklyn
September 28 [?], 1857	Excelsior Club	25–1	Win	Brooklyn
October 5, 1857	Young America	19–16	Win	unknown
October 17, 1857	Star Club of Brooklyn	21–11	Win	Brooklyn (Enterprise Grounds)
October 28, 1857	Young America	22–16	Win	Brooklyn (Enterprise Grounds)
October 31, 1857	Ashland	27-7	Win	Hoboken (Fox Hill)
November 20, 1857	Star Club of Brooklyn	unknown	draw	unknown
May 28, 1858	Star Club of Brooklyn	18–21	Loss	Brooklyn (Excelsior Grounds, Carroll Park)
June 10 or 17, 1858	Amity	50–30	Win	Hoboken (Fox Hill)
June 19, 1858	Ashland	27–22	Win	Hoboken (Fox Hill)
June 26, 1858	Union	12-8	Win	Brooklyn (Enterprise Grounds)
July 3, 1858	North Star	38–10	Win	Brooklyn (North Star Grounds)
July 8, 1858	Amity	34–17	Win	Hoboken (Fox Hill)
July 24, 1858	Resolute Club of Brooklyn	25–18	Win	Brooklyn (Wheat Hill)
August 4, 1858	North Star	15–8	Win	Brooklyn (Enterprise Grounds)
August 11, 1858	Resolute Club of Brooklyn	unknown	["scheduled return match"]	Brooklyn (Bedford Atlantic Grounds)
August 18, 1858	Ashland	unknown	["scheduled return match"]	Brooklyn (Bedford Atlantic Grounds)
September 1, 1858	Lone Star Club of Jersey City	23–44	Loss	Jersey City (Lone Star Grounds)
September 3, 1858	Champion of Yorkville	17–36	Loss	Brooklyn (81st St and 2nd Ave.)
September 25, 1858	Resolute Club of Brooklyn	unknown	["scheduled"]	Brooklyn (Enterprise Grounds)
October 20, 1858	Champion Club of Yorkville	20–18	Win	Brooklyn (Enterprise Grounds)
October 27, 1858	Lone Star Club of Jersey City	unknown	["scheduled return match"]	Brooklyn
August 20, 1859	Champion Club of Yorkville	8–21	Loss	[conflicting reports]
prior to Aug. 31, 1859	Niagara	31–7	Win	unknown
September 30, 1859	Oakland	30–18	Win	Brooklyn (Enterprise Grounds)
October 4, 1859	Powhatan Club of Brooklyn	13–11	Win	Brooklyn (Bedford)
prior to Oct. 22, 1859	Lone Star Club of Jersey City	17–11	Win	unknown
October 24, 1859	Oakland	19–12	Win	Oakland Grounds
November 9, 1859	Powhatan Club of Brooklyn	15–8	Win	Brooklyn (Powhatan Grounds)
July 16, 1860	Atlantic of Brooklyn	20–38	Loss	Brooklyn (Enterprise Grounds)
July 24, 1860	Eckford of Brooklyn	10–20	Loss	Brooklyn (Bedford)
August 1, 1860	Hamilton of Brooklyn	24–8 (or 26–10 per some sources)	Win	Brooklyn (Hamilton Grounds)
August 7, 1860	Poughkeepsie	18–14	Win	Poughkeepsie
August 10, 1860	Newark Eurekas	25–21	Win	unknown
August 16 or 17, 1860	Atlantic of Brooklyn	14–16	Loss	Brooklyn (Atlantic Grounds)
August 24, 1860	New York Gothams	15–56	Loss	Hoboken
August 27, 1860	Newark Eurekas	13–20	Loss	Newark (Eureka Grounds)
August 29, 1860	New York Gothams	15–21	Loss	Brooklyn
September 26, 1860	Eckford of Brooklyn	18–31	Loss	Brooklyn (Greenpoint)
October 3, 1860	Eckford of Brooklyn	20–38	Loss	Brooklyn (Bedford)
October 10, 1860	Eureka Club of Newark	25–21	Win	Brooklyn (Bedford)
October 18, 1860	Eckford of Brooklyn	31–16	Win	unknown
November 1, 1860	Eckford of Brooklyn	unknown	["scheduled"]	unknown
June 5, 1861	Eckford of Brooklyn	19–53 (or 52)	Loss	Brooklyn (Bedford)
June 26, 1861	Hamilton	38–27	Win	Brooklyn (Hamilton Grounds)
July 10, 1861	Newark Eurekas	5–27	Loss	unknown
August 20, 1861	New York Gothams	13–14	Loss	Hoboken (Elysian Fields)
September 5, 1861	Eckford of Brooklyn	20–27	Loss	Brooklyn (Atlantic Grounds)
September 10, 1861	Hamilton of Brooklyn	41–23	Win	Brooklyn (Atlantic Grounds)
September 21, 1861	Brooklyn [unknown name]	46–12	Win	Brooklyn (Enterprise Grounds)
September 25, 1861	Mutual Club of New York	21 [or 23]–33	Loss	Hoboken (Elysian Fields)
October 4, 1861	Eckford of Brooklyn	20–19	Win	Brooklyn (Manor House Grounds, Greenpoint)
October 17, 1861	Eckford of Brooklyn	26–23 [or 24]	Win	Brooklyn (Putnam Grounds)
May 20, 1862	Eckford of Brooklyn	20–19	Win	Brooklyn (Greenpoint)
July 16, 1864	Excelsior Club	19–25	Loss	Brooklyn (Capitoline Grounds)
July 26, 1864	New York Gothams	13–22	Loss	Hoboken
June 6, 1865	New York Gothams	18–19 (12 innings)	Loss	Hoboken
June 24, 1865	Star Club of Brooklyn	36–44	Loss	Brooklyn (Star Grounds, Carroll Park)
July 29, 1865	Active of New York	12–27	Loss	Hoboken
August 5, 1865	Star Club of Brooklyn	38–47	Loss	Brooklyn (Capitoline Grounds)
August 7, 1865	Hudson River Club of Newburgh	unknown	Win	Brooklyn (Capitoline Grounds)
August 16, 1865	Empire Club	33–37	Loss	Brooklyn (Bedford)
August 28, 1865	Eckford of Brooklyn	20–21	Loss	Brooklyn (Union Grounds)
September 2, 1865	Active of New York	18–28	Loss	Brooklyn (Capitoline Grounds)
September 13, 1865	Eckford of Brooklyn	25–26	Loss	Brooklyn (Capitoline Grounds)
September 26, 1865	Excelsior Club	21–46	Loss	Brooklyn (Capitoline Grounds)
November 11, 1865	Excelsior Club	16–43	Loss	Brooklyn (Capitoline Grounds)
June 16, 1866	Union of Morrisania	16–42	Loss	Morrisania, The Bronx
June 20, 1866	Eckford of Brooklyn	21–39	Loss	Brooklyn (Capitoline Grounds)
June 30, 1866	Active of New York	26–31	Loss	Hoboken
July 4, 1866	Active of New York	26–29 (10 innings)	Loss	Brooklyn (Capitoline Grounds)
July 21, 1866	Pacific Club of New Utrecht	30–15	Win	New Utrecht (Long Island)
September 3, 1866	Eckford of Brooklyn	10–34	Loss	Brooklyn (Union Grounds)
September 4, 1866	Eclectic of New York	24–14	Win	Hoboken
September 10, 1866	Eckford of Brooklyn	22–17	Win	Brooklyn (Union Grounds)
September 14, 1866	Excelsior Club	18–16	Win	unknown
September 19, 1866	Waterbury	37–21	Win	Hoboken
October 6, 1866	Union Club	6–43	Loss	Brooklyn (Capitoline Grounds)
October 20, 1866	Eclectic of New York	31–18	Win	Brooklyn (Capitoline Grounds)
October 24, 1866	Pacific Club of New Utrecht	52–19	Win	unknown

== Sources ==
Freyer, John and Mark Rucker. Peverelly's National Game. Dover, New Hampshire: Arcadia Publishing: 2005. ISBN 0-7385-3404-8
