= Fred Crane (baseball) =

American baseball player (1840–1925)

- First baseman
- Born: November 4, 1840; Old Saybrook, Connecticut, U.S.
- Died: April 27, 1925 (aged 84); Brooklyn, New York, U.S.
- Batted: Unknown Threw: Unknown

Teams
- National Association of Base Ball Players Enterprise of Brooklyn (1861) Brooklyn Atlantics (1862–1869) Excelsior of Brooklyn (1866) Alpha of Brooklyn (1870)

Frederic William Hotchkiss Crane (November 4, 1840 – April 27, 1925) was an American professional baseball player who played in the National Association of Base Ball Players (NABBP) from 1861 to 1870. Joining the Brooklyn Atlantics club in 1862 with teammates Joe Start and Jack Chapman from the Enterprise club, his best season was in 1865 when he scored 71 runs in 18 games (second, behind Start) for the undefeated champions.

Crane was previously believed to have played for the Elizabeth Resolutes in 1873 and the Brooklyn Atlantics in 1875, which would have made him a Major League Baseball (MLB) player. However, there was some indication that Fred was actually an entirely different person than the Crane who played for Elizabeth and Brooklyn. At the time of his supposed MLB debut in 1873, many people were excited believing that the veteran Fred Crane from the NABBP was making a comeback. However, the Philadelphia Sunday Dispatch stated that it was "Not Fred Crane". The book Baseball Fever: Early Baseball in Michigan says that Crane was rumored to be heading to play for a club in Detroit, but it was later confirmed that he had retired in 1870.

In 2025, the Society for American Baseball Research officially determined that Fred Crane had indeed not played for either the Elizabeth Resolutes or the Brooklyn Atlantics. The 1873 Elizabeth Resolutes player was revealed to be William Crane while the 1875 Brooklyn Atlantics player was Thomas Crane.
