= Fred Crane =

Fred Crane may refer to:

- Fred Crane (baseball)
- Fred Crane (actor)
