= Putnam Grounds =

Putnam Grounds may refer to:

== Sports ==
=== Baseball ===
- Putnam Grounds (Brooklyn), a ballpark of mid-19th century Brooklyn, New York that included the 1860 National Association of Base Ball Players championship
- Putnam Grounds (Troy), the ballpark in Troy, New York that the National League team, the Troy Trojans, considered home in 1879
