= Thomas Talmage =

Thomas Talmage may refer to:

- Thomas De Witt Talmage, American preacher, clergyman and divine
- Thomas G. Talmage, mayor of Brooklyn
