= Edward Lambert (disambiguation) =

Edward Lambert (born 1951) is an English composer.

Edward Lambert may also refer to:

- Edward A. Lambert (1813–1885), Brooklyn mayor
- Edward H. Lambert (1915–2003), Mayo Clinic electromyographer
- Edward M. Lambert Jr. (born 1958), Massachusetts politician
- Eddie J. Lambert, Louisiana politician
