= Newark Eurekas =

Baseball team in New Jersey, USA in 1850s-1860s

The Eureka Baseball Club of Newark or the Newark Eurekas was a baseball team in Newark, New Jersey, United States.

The Eureka team was part of the NABBP in the 1850s and 1860s. The Eureka Club first began playing other members of the NABBP in 1860. They played at a field at Ferry Street and Adams Street in the Ironbound.

== Players* ==
Name	Position	GP	Hands lost	A O	Runs	A O
Harry Northrup	1B	6	15	2-3	15	2-3
Edward R. Pennington	2B	10	29	2-9	30	3-0
C. Van Houton	SS	7	27	3-6	14	2-0
Charles Thomas	3B	8	26	3-2	14	1-6
R. Davidson	OF	9	24	2-6	25	2-7
T. Oliver	OF	8	25	3-1	16	2-0
J. Collins	OF	10	27	2-7	24	2-4
G. Rogers	C	8	27	3-3	17	2-1
J. Linen	P	10	31	3-1	22	2-2

Other players for the team in 1860 were H. Brientnall, A. Littlewood, E Benedict, P. Baldwin, E. Thomas, T. Price and R. Elsden. Brientnall played five games; Littlewood, three; Benedict, two; and the other four members played only in a single game during the season.

- This roster is from the 1860 NABBP season.

== Season by season ==
- 1860

The Eurekas had the eleventh best win percentage and the eight most wins. They batted in the fifth most runs of any team at 213.

- 1861

Newark only played one game against the Enterprise baseball club from Brooklyn and beat them 27–5.

- 1862

Newark played only two games this season against ranked NABBP ballclubs. They lost to the Mutuals by one run and beat the Gothams by five runs.

- Newark played three games this season: two against New York Clubs and one against the Athletic club from Philadelphia. The Eurekas beat the team from Philadelphia by two runs, but lost to the two New York clubs in August.
- 1864

The Eurekas had the tenth best win percentage and the tenth most wins in the league, despite having the fifth lowest number of runs in the league. They won exactly half of the eight games that they played.

- 1865

The Eurekas finished the season with the sixth best record and the sixth most wins with a record of nine and five. They also had the sixth best team runs batted in at 339 in their fourteen games.

- 1866

The NABBP saw a lot of growth this season with nearly sixty teams, but Newark was still able to maintain an excellent standing, as they had the ninth most wins. The Eureka club was also in the top third for winning percentage. They had a nine and six record and batted in 446 runs in these fifteen games. This was the seventh most runs by a single team in the league in 1866. On August 28, seventeen-year-old Candy Cummings comes in for pitcher Asa Brainard of the Brooklyn Excelsiors, leading his team to a 24–2 win. Candy Cummings is said to be the first pitcher to throw a curveball and for his future performance in the National League was inducted into the Baseball Hall of Fame.

- 1867

This was the first year the Eureka club really struggled during the season. They only won two of their ten games, giving them for the first time one of the worst winning percentages in the league, although there were nine team who didn't win a game in 1867. They had a reasonable number of runs batted in at 230, but was a small number for this team that had over two hundred more the prior season (only having played five more games).

- 1868

The team only played four games this season and won half. They only drove in 77 runs for the four games.

- 1869

The Eureka Club only participated in two games in 1869 and lost both, with margins of eight and nine.

== Scores ==
Date	Opponent	Score	Win/Loss/Tie	Record*
June 7, 1860	Hamilton (JC)	18-35	Loss	0-1
June 29, 1860	Harlem	15-21	Loss	0-2
August 3, 1860	Harlem	34-18	Win	1-2
August 10, 1860	Brooklyn Enterprise	21-25	Loss	1-3
August 22, 1860	Newark Adriatics	34-6	Win	2-3
August 27, 1860	Brooklyn Enterprise	21-13	Win	3-3
September 14, 1860	Harlem	10-23	Loss	3-4
September 19, 1860	Newark Adriatics	12-12	Tie	3-4-1
September 26, 1860	Newark	28-14	Win	4-4-1
October 26, 1860	Belleville Baltics	20-24	Loss	4-5-1
July 10, 1861	Brooklyn Enterprise	27-5	Win	5-5-1
August 21, 1862	New York Mutuals	13-14 (10)	Loss	5-6-1
August ?, 1862	New York Gothams	18-13	Win	6-6-1
June 20, 1863	Philadelphia Athletics	8-6	Win	7-6-1
August 11, 1863	New York Mutuals	7-13	Loss	7-7-1
August 31, 1863	Brooklyn Atlantics	15-16	Loss	7-8-1
July 4, 1864	New York Active	27-29	Loss	7-9-1
July 6, 1864	Brooklyn Atlantics	13-25	Loss	7-10-1
July 7, 1864	Princeton Nassua	24-12	Win	8-10-1
August 2, 1864	New York Mutuals	10-16	Loss	8-11-1
September 14, 1864	New York Active	11-10	Win	9-11-1
NA	New York Empire	NA	Win	10-11-1
NA	New York Empire	NA	Win	11-11-1
NA	New York Mutuals	NA	Loss	11-12-1
June 12, 1865	Philadelphia Athletics	9-12	Loss	11-13-1
July 8, 1864	Morrisania Union	30-5	Win	12-13-1
July 24, 1865	Philadelphia Keystones	50-11	Win	13-13-1
July 31, 1865	New York Mutuals	12-27	Loss	13-14-1
August 8, 1865	Philadelphia Athletics	28-38	Loss	13-15-1
August 18, 1865	Brooklyn Atlantics	20-21	Loss	13-16-1
August 24, 1865	Newark Pioneers	12-5	Win	14-16-1
August 31, 1865	Brooklyn Atlantics	37-38	Loss	14-17-1
September 7, 1865	Morrisania Union	30-10	Win	15-17-1
September 14, 1865	New York Mutuals	20-19	Win	16-17-1
October 5, 1865	Newark Americus	85-12	Win	17-17-1
October 20, 1865	New York Active	6-3	Win	18-17-1
NA	Newark Pioneers	NA	Win	19-17-1
NA	Newark	NA	Win	20-17-1
May 31, 1866	Harvard	42-39	Win	21-17-1
June 12, 1866	Morrisania Union	26-28	Loss	21-18-1
June 22, 1866	Newark Americus	67-7	Win	22-18-1
June 28, 1866	New York Mutuals	13-24	Loss	22-19-1
July 10, 1866	Kearney	45-6	Win	23-19-1
August 14, 1866	Brooklyn Atlantics	36-10	Win	24-19-1
August 20, 1866	New York Empire	15-11	Win	25-19-1
August 27, 1866	Philadelphia Athletics	8-48	Loss	25-20-1
August 28, 1866	Brooklyn Excelsior	2-24	Loss	25-21-1
September 12, 1866	New York Active	24-9	Win	26-21-1
September 18, 1866	Morrisania Union	23-25	Loss	26-22-1
September 27, 1866	Brooklyn Atlantics	20-30	Loss	26-23-1
October 17, 1866	New York Active	44-12	Win	27-23-1
October 25, 1866	Brooklyn Atlantics	13-38	Loss	27-24-1
NA	Kearney	NA	Win	28-24-1
NA	New York Empire	NA	Win	29-24-1
May 16, 1867	Irvington	17-25	Loss	29-25-1
May 23, 1867	New Brunswick Stars	66-9	Win	30-25-1
June 12, 1867	Morrisania Union	12-26	Loss	30-26-1
August 6, 1867	Lansingburgh Union	21-42	Loss	30-27-1
August 14, 1867	Hartford Charter Oaks	35-9	Win	31-27-1
August 23, 1867	New York Mutuals	21-34	Loss	31-28-1
September 5, 1867	Brooklyn Atlantics	13-21	Loss	31-29-1
September 10, 1867	Morrisania Union	14-33	Loss	31-30-1
September 23, 1867	Brooklyn Excelsior	22-41	Loss	31-31-1
November 2, 1867	Irvington	9-22	Loss	31-32-1
May 28, 1868	Brooklyn Atlantics	8-45	Loss	31-33-1
June 24, 1868	Jersey City Champions	17-4	Win	32-33-1
July 9, 1868	Greenpoint Oriental	22-28	Loss	32-34-1
NA	NA	NA	Win	33-34-1
September 19, 1869	New York Empire	6-14	Loss	33-35-1
October 3, 1869	New York Empire	0-9	Loss	33-36-1

- Note - Based on games recorded in Marshall Wright's book.
