= Joseph Sprague =

American politician (1783–1854)

Joseph Sprague (July 25, 1783 – December 12, 1854) was an American businessman and politician who served as Mayor of Brooklyn.

== Life ==
Sprague was born on July 25, 1783, in Leicester, Massachusetts. He was the son of Captain William Sprague, a militia captain and deputy sheriff of the county, and Sarah Sargent. He attended Leicester Academy.

The son of a wealthy farmer, Sprague initially worked on his father's farm. When he was 21, he moved to Boston and became a clerk at a wholesale store. Around two years later, he began working as a country merchant for the next few years until the embargo with Europe crippled his business. After spending some time back in Leicester Academy, his father deeded him a small farm. After a year of farming, he concluded farming wasn't for him. In 1809, he sold the farm, invested the proceeds in wire cards for carding wool and cotton, and moved to New York City to work as a teacher. After his marriage, he lived partly in New York City and partly in the village of Bedford.

During the War of 1812, there was an increase in demand for domestic manufactures, and woolen card prices rose to unprecedented levels. Sprague's father and brother established a card factory in Leicester, and Sprague managed the factory's sales in New York City for some time. In 1819, he moved to the village of Brooklyn. In 1822, he was one of the founders of the First Presbyterian Church. In 1823, he helped secure a charter for the Long Island Bank and the Brooklyn Fire Insurance Co. In 1825, he became village trustee. He was elected village president in 1827, and was re-elected to that office until 1832. In 1826, he and Col. Alden J. Spooner managed to secure Fort Greene for the village. In 1833, he helped secure a city charter for Brooklyn. In 1834, he became the first president of the Long Island Insurance Co., a position he held for the next ten years.

In 1843, Sprague was elected Mayor of Brooklyn as a Democrat, and was re-elected to the office in 1844. During his first mayoral term, the Whig members of the Common Council refused to attend the board meetings, to which he responded by having them arrested on misdemeanor charges due to neglecting public business. In 1848, he was one of the biggest advocates for opening Washington Park in Fort Greene. He served multiple terms as town supervisor as late as 1851. He was a member of the board of consolidation that planned the union between Brooklyn, Williamsburgh, and Bushwick. At the time of his death, he was a director of the Mechanics Bank.

In 1817, Sprague married Maria De Bevoise. Their children were Sarah Jane, Horace A., and William E. He was a founder of his local Freemason lodge, and served as lodge master as well as treasurer of the Grand Lodge of New York. His namesake grandson, Joseph E. Sprague, played baseball for the National Club of Brooklyn, the Brooklyn Enterprise, the Eckford Club, and other pre-professional teams, from 1858 to 1865.

Sprague died at home on December 12, 1854. He was buried in Green-Wood Cemetery.

Political offices
Preceded by Henry C. Murphy	Mayor of Brooklyn; 1843–1844	Succeeded by Thomas G. Talmage
