= Newark Adriatics =

The Newark Adriatics, also known as the Adriatic Base Ball Club of Newark, was a member of the National Association of Base Ball Players before the American Civil War. The Adriatics first played another member in September 1857 and joined the NABBP for the 1858 to 1861 seasons.

== Games ==
These are all the Newark Adriatics games listed somewhere by Marshall Wright (2000). For 1857, the game with the Union club of Morrisania, now in the Bronx, is the only listed match versus a non-member club (Adriatic), and the only listed match versus a club outside modern New York City. Only that spring, sixteen clubs within modern New York had convened for the first time, which was later recognized as initiating the Association.

Date	Opponent	Score	Decision	Record
September 25, 1857	Morrisania Union	11-28	Loss	0-1
August 5, 1858	Morrisania Union	16-33	Loss	0-2
October 28, 1858	Brooklyn Pastime	45-13	Win	1-2
July 2, 1860	New York Eagles	15-18	Loss	1-3
August ?, 1860	Morrisania Union	8-17	Loss	1-4
August 22, 1860	Newark Eurekas	6-34	Loss	1-5
September 6, 1860	Brooklyn Charter Oaks	11-13	Loss	1-6
September 19, 1860	Newark Eurekas	12-12	Tie	1-6-1
September 5, 1861	Newark	14-17	Loss	1-7-1
