= Conklin Brush =

American businessman and Mayor of Brooklyn

Conklin Brush (March 8, 1794 – July 4, 1870) was an American businessman and Mayor of Brooklyn.

== Life ==
Brush was born on March 8, 1794, in Ridgefield, Connecticut, the son of Philip Brush and Ruth Brush. His nephew was Professor George Jarvis Brush, the director of Sheffield Scientific School at Yale University.

Brush moved to New York City, New York, after the War of 1812. He worked as a merchant from 1816 to 1840, and was head of nine successful mercantile firms during that time. In 1827, he moved to the then-village of Brooklyn. He was elected to the board of trustees in 1830. He served on the common council from 1834 to 1835 and was president of the board. In 1832, he took measures to install the first public lamps in Brooklyn. In 1834, he was chairman of a committee raised to fight for more ferry rights and led the movement to expand Fulton Street from a cow path to a major avenue. He was also a member of a committee to pick a location for Brooklyn City Hall. In 1840, he helped incorporate the Atlantic docks, serving as company director, and in 1848 he erected a grain elevator and several stores there.

In 1850, Brush was elected Mayor of Brooklyn as a Whig, serving in that office from 1851 to 1852. At the end of his term he became president of the Mechanics' Bank of Brooklyn. He was heavily involved with the movement to acquire a water supply for the city, and he was appointed to the board of construction of the water commissioners.

Brush was a member and vestryman of the Protestant Episcopal Church. In 1816, he married Rosannah Hoyt. They had 11 children, including Delia, Jane, Anna, Goold, Henry, Julia M., and Francis Vinton.

Brush died at home on July 4, 1870. He was buried in Green-Wood Cemetery.

Political offices
Preceded by Samuel Smith	Mayor of Brooklyn; 1851–1852	Succeeded by Edward A. Lambert
