= Charley Smith (infielder) =

American baseball player (1840–1897)

- Infielder
- Born: December 11, 1840; Brooklyn, New York
- Died: November 15, 1897 (aged 56); Great Neck, New York
- Batted: Unknown Threw: Unknown

MLB debut
- May 18, 1871, for the New York Mutuals

Last MLB appearance
- August 1, 1871, for the New York Mutuals

MLB statistics
- Batting average: .264
- Runs scored: 15
- Runs batted in: 5
- Stats at Baseball Reference

Teams
- National Association of Base Ball Players Brooklyn Atlantics (1858–1870) National Association of Professional BBP New York Mutuals (1871)

Charles J. Smith (December 11, 1840 – November 15, 1897) was a Major League Baseball infielder. He played in 14 games for the New York Mutuals in 1871, hitting .264 in 72 at bats.

In the pre-professional era of early baseball, Smith played for the amateur Brooklyn Enterprise until 1858, when he joined the Brooklyn Atlantics, for whom he played until 1870. The Atlantics were one of the premiere clubs active in the sport's Amateur Era, which pre-dated the advent of paid professionalism. Based on newspaper accounts and older player reminiscences, Smith was considered a high-caliber player. However, in that era, game-by-game statistics were not regularly compiled, so there is no way to assess Smith's value compared to other players.

Smith's name was alternately spelled "Charley" and "Charlie" in the press.

Smith's 1897 obit in the Brooklyn Daily Eagle included the following: "Smith was regarded as the premier third baseman. He had a quick eye, fearlessly faced the swiftly batted balls, which then contained much more rubber than those now in use, and captured difficult fly balls in a graceful manner. He was also a remarkably accurate thrower, a splendid batsman and a dashing base runner. The late Harry Wright said once in speaking about Charlie [sic] Smith: 'Undoubtedly, he was the king of third baseman.'"

Smith played in an era before fielders wore gloves and had to handle the ball barehanded. An 1897 obit in the Brooklyn Daily Times reported, "Up to the day that he died, Charlie Smith's crooked fingers bore eloquent testimony to many a hot grounder that he had gathered in and many a foul ball fly that he had nipped. He was practically invincible in his position at third."

== Sources ==
- Baseball Reference
