= Samuel Smith (New York politician) =

American politician

Samuel Smith (May 26, 1788 – May 19, 1872) was an American politician and Mayor of Brooklyn.

== Life ==
Smith was born on May 26, 1788, in Huntington, New York, the son of Zachariah and Annie.

Smith grew up on his father's farm, in a section of the town called Old Fields. He attended Huntington Academy. In 1803, he learned to be a cooper with his brother-in-law. In 1806, he moved to the village of Brooklyn. In 1809, he abandoned being a cooper and started farming, initially farming in the John Jackson place that he bought with Richard Bouton. A year later, he moved to what was known as the Post farm in Fort Greene. The farm was initially 14 acres, but he gradually expanded the farm over the next several years. He continued working as a farmer until around 1825, when he turned to the improvement and sale of his real estate. He proved successful in this and became one of the wealthiest people in Brooklyn. He was also a director of the Brooklyn Bank, a director and president of the Atlantic Bank, an incorporator of the Nassau Insurance Company, and a director of the Mechanics Insurance and Home Life Insurance Companies. His farm was bounded by Red Hook Lane, and Smith Street, which was named after him.

During the War of 1812, Smith briefly served with the Washington Fusiliers in Fort Greene. He later became captain of the 44th Regiment.

Smith served as commissioner of highways and fence viewer of Brooklyn from 1821 to 1825, 1827, 1833, and 1834. He was an assessor from 1827 to 1830. In 1831, he was justice of the peace and served that position for several years. He also served as town supervisor and chairman of the board, county judge, and a superintendent of the poor. He served as alderman of the Sixth Ward from 1834 to 1838, 1842 to 1844, and 1845 to 1846. In 1850, he was elected Mayor of Brooklyn as a Democrat. As he was elected when the city charter was amended to have all municipal offices begin with the civil year, he only served as mayor for the last eight months of 1850.

In 1811, Smith married Eliza Joralemon, daughter of Judge Tunis Joralemon.

Smith died at home on May 19, 1872.

Political offices
Preceded by Edward Copland	Mayor of Brooklyn; 1850	Succeeded by Conklin Brush
