= Jim Creighton =

American baseball player (1841–1862)

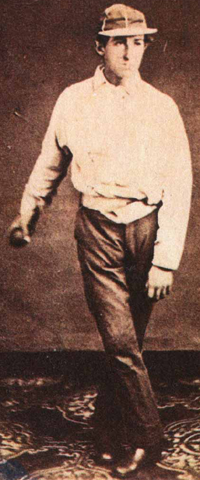
- Pitcher
- Born: April 15, 1841; Manhattan, New York, US
- Died: October 18, 1862 (aged 21); Brooklyn, New York, US
- Batted: Right Threw: Right

Teams
- National Association of Base Ball Players: Brooklyn Niagaras (1858–1859); Brooklyn Stars (1859); Excelsior of Brooklyn (1860, 1862)

James Creighton Jr. (April 15, 1841 – October 18, 1862) was an American baseball player during the game's amateur era, and is considered by historians to be the sport's first superstar and one of its earliest paid competitors. In 1860 and 1862 he played for one of the most dominant clubs of the era, the Excelsior of Brooklyn. He was also a superb cricketer, playing in both amateur and professional matches.

During the early, pre-professional period of baseball's evolution, Creighton's pitching technique transformed the sport from a game that showcased hitting, running, and fielding into a confrontation between the pitcher and batter. Under game rules of the 1850s, a pitcher was required to toss the ball in an underhand motion with a stiff arm/stiff wrist movement. The intention was to induce the batter to swing and put the ball in play, thus initiating action around the diamond. The pitcher was essentially just another position player, a "fielder" once the ball was struck by the hitter.

Creighton's swift delivery confounded opposing batters, who were accustomed to balls being lobbed slowly over the plate and easy to hit. Historian Thomas Gilbert, in his 2015 book Playing First: Early Baseball Lives at Brooklyn's Green-Wood Cemetery, which includes a chapter on Creighton and his family, referred to Creighton's pitching style as "weaponizing the ball." Gilbert wrote Creighton "was the first pitcher in the modern sense of the word."

On October 14, 1862, at the height of his popularity, Creighton collapsed at a game from severe abdominal pain. It was later determined that he had suffered from a chronic inguinal hernia, a condition possibly caused and exacerbated by his unorthodox pitching motion and high per-game pitch counts. Creighton died at home four days later. The cause of death was a strangulated intestine.

== Early life ==
Creighton was born on April 15, 1841, in lower Manhattan to Irish immigrant parents James and Jane (née McBrien) Creighton, and lived there with his family in a Sixth Ward slum known as Five Points. When James was eight, his mother died. In late 1857, his father moved the family to Brooklyn (which, at the time, was a separate city). By age 16, James had become recognized for his superior athletic skills in baseball and cricket.

According to contemporaneous hearsay, often later repeated in biographical chronicles, in 1857 Creighton helped form a club known as the Young America, which lasted one season; however, there are no authoritative historical accounts of this being accurate.

At age 17, Creighton joined the Niagara of Brooklyn club, playing second base. The Niagaras were a junior club with an established relationship to a reputable Brooklyn senior club, known as the Excelsiors, one of the pre-eminent clubs of the time.

== Baseball ==
=== Discovery by the Star Club ===
In a match on July 19, 1859, the Niagaras were being heavily outscored by the Star Club of Brooklyn. Creighton, who had thus far played primarily in the infield, was brought on as a substitute pitcher. Using what observers described as a "low, swift delivery," Creighton achieved uncommonly swift velocity. With the balls "rising from the ground past the shoulder to the catcher," the Star batsmen were unable to hit his pitches effectively. Under the rules of baseball at the time, a pitcher was required to deliver the ball underhanded with his arm locked straight at the elbow and at the wrist. Creighton also managed to apply spin to the ball, making it harder for batters to hit it squarely. Star batsmen claimed that Creighton was using an illegal snap of the wrist to deliver the pitch. The Star Club eventually won the game, but following the match, Creighton left the Niagaras and joined the Stars.

=== Joins the Excelsiors ===
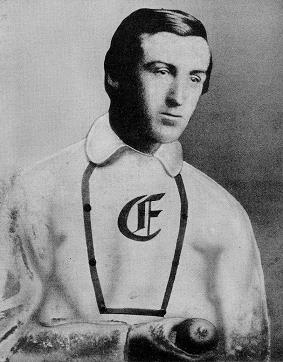
Jim Creighton as an Excelsior (derived from the club photo)

Before the 1860 season began, Creighton left the Star Club and joined the Excelsiors. With their new dominant pitcher, the Excelsiors organized the first documented baseball road trip, playing matches outside their home region against upstate New York clubs in Albany, Rochester, Troy, Buffalo, and Newburgh, as well as in Baltimore and Philadelphia. After a string of victories, the club became a sensation outside the New York metropolitan area. In a baseball game against the St George's Cricket Club at Hoboken's Elysian Fields on November 8, Creighton hurled baseball's first shutout, with a final score of 25–0.

In addition to his pitching skills, Creighton was reportedly an excellent hitter and fielder. (The Excelsiors, along with most organized clubs, did not play ball in 1861, as countless players of military age enlisted to fight in the Civil War.)

=== Pitching style ===
The speed with which Creighton was able to hurl the ball had previously been considered impossible without movement of the elbow or wrist, which was prohibited by existing rules. If there were any such movements by Creighton, they were imperceptible. In addition to the rapid velocity of his pitches, when Creighton released the ball, he managed to apply enough spin to cause the pitch to veer upwards, away from the batter, making Creighton the inadvertent inventor of the breaking ball. "He threw much, much harder than anyone before him," wrote Creighton's biographer Thomas W. Gilbert, "with lethal movement and exquisite control. He almost never lost."

Creighton was accused by some opponents and spectators of using an illegal delivery. In effect, because Creighton was exceptionally successful, his opponents assumed he was cheating. However, the competitive advantage of this delivery, and his dominance as a pitcher, eventually led others to emulate his technique, which thereafter became a standard pitching tactic.

Years later, Excelsior teammate John (a.k.a. "Jack") Chapman recalled that Creighton "had wonderful speed, and, with it, splendid command. He was fairly unhittable." After Creighton held the famed rival Brooklyn Atlantics to five runs, an extraordinarily low total for the era, the Brooklyn Eagle dispatched a reporter to determine whether or not his pitch was legal. The journalistic witness reported that Creighton was throwing a "fair square pitch", rather than a "jerk" or an "underhand throw."

=== Professionalism ===
Creighton (third from left) in the Excelsiors club photo

During this era of baseball, the game was an amateur sport, and clubs served as social organizations with sporting activities rather than as strictly sports alliances. Creighton was described as principled, unassuming, and gentlemanly — traits considered ideal during the amateur era. However, rumors circulated that clubs had started paying exceptional players in an under-the-table manner. Clubs would hire the player ostensibly for a position of responsibility within their administration, or the player would be given a sinecure in a municipal department, with the understanding that there were no actual duties required beyond playing for the sports club.

In 1860, the Excelsior Club lured Creighton, along with teammates George Flanley and the brothers Asa and Henry Brainard, from the Stars. All but Henry Brainard were quietly paid a salary, with Creighton earning $500, thus making these men some of the earliest "professional" baseball players.

In September 1862, rumors circulated that Creighton and teammates George Flanley and Asa Brainard were jumping from the Excelsior Club to the Atlantic Club of Brooklyn. After three weeks of speculation, and without any of these men having played in a game for the Atlantic, they returned to the field for the Excelsiors.

Creighton biographer Thomas Gilbert points out that three of the preeminent pitchers of the amateur era, Jim Creighton, Asa Brainard, and Arthur "Candy" Cummings, were all mentored and caught by one man, Excelsior veteran catcher Joseph "Joe" Leggett. While acknowledging that Leggett was an exceptionally talented catcher and developer of pitching talent, Gilbert has chronicled countless misdeeds by Leggett, who was a compulsive gambler, including the likely throwing of the 1860 National Association championship series between the Excelsior and the Brooklyn Atlantic.

== Cricket ==
Creighton was considered a prominent member of the cricket community, playing both amateur and professional. He performed for the American Cricket Club in both 1861 and 1862, often playing against the all-England team, whether at Hoboken's Elysian Fields or elsewhere. Though the English teams would dominate these matches, Creighton fared well. In an 1859 match of 11 Englishmen against 16 Americans, he clean bowled five wickets out of six successive balls.

== Death ==
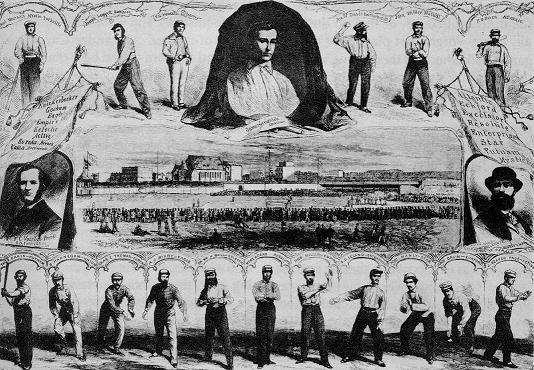
Poster featuring the enshrouded image of Jim Creighton (a drawing derived from the club photo)

There has been some historical controversy about the circumstances of Creighton's death. On October 14, 1862, Creighton played second base in a match on the Excelsior Grounds against the Union of Morrisania club, while Asa Brainard pitched. Creighton had allegedly hit four doubles in four at bats during the first five innings. As chronicled 50 years later by a witness to the game, Jack Chapman, Creighton took over pitching duties from Brainard in the sixth inning, and in his next at bat hit a home run. While swinging the bat, he allegedly suffered an injury in his abdominal area. According to Chapman, when Creighton crossed home plate, he commented to the next batter, George Flanly, that he heard something snap. After the game, he began to experience severe pain and hemorrhaging in his abdomen. He died in his father's home on October 18 at the age of 21. In an 1887 issue of an early sports newspaper, the Sporting Life, a letter-writer, who signed only as "Old Timer", sent in his account of the event. This account reported it as a ruptured bladder; in the light of modern medical understanding, the injury was an inguinal hernia.

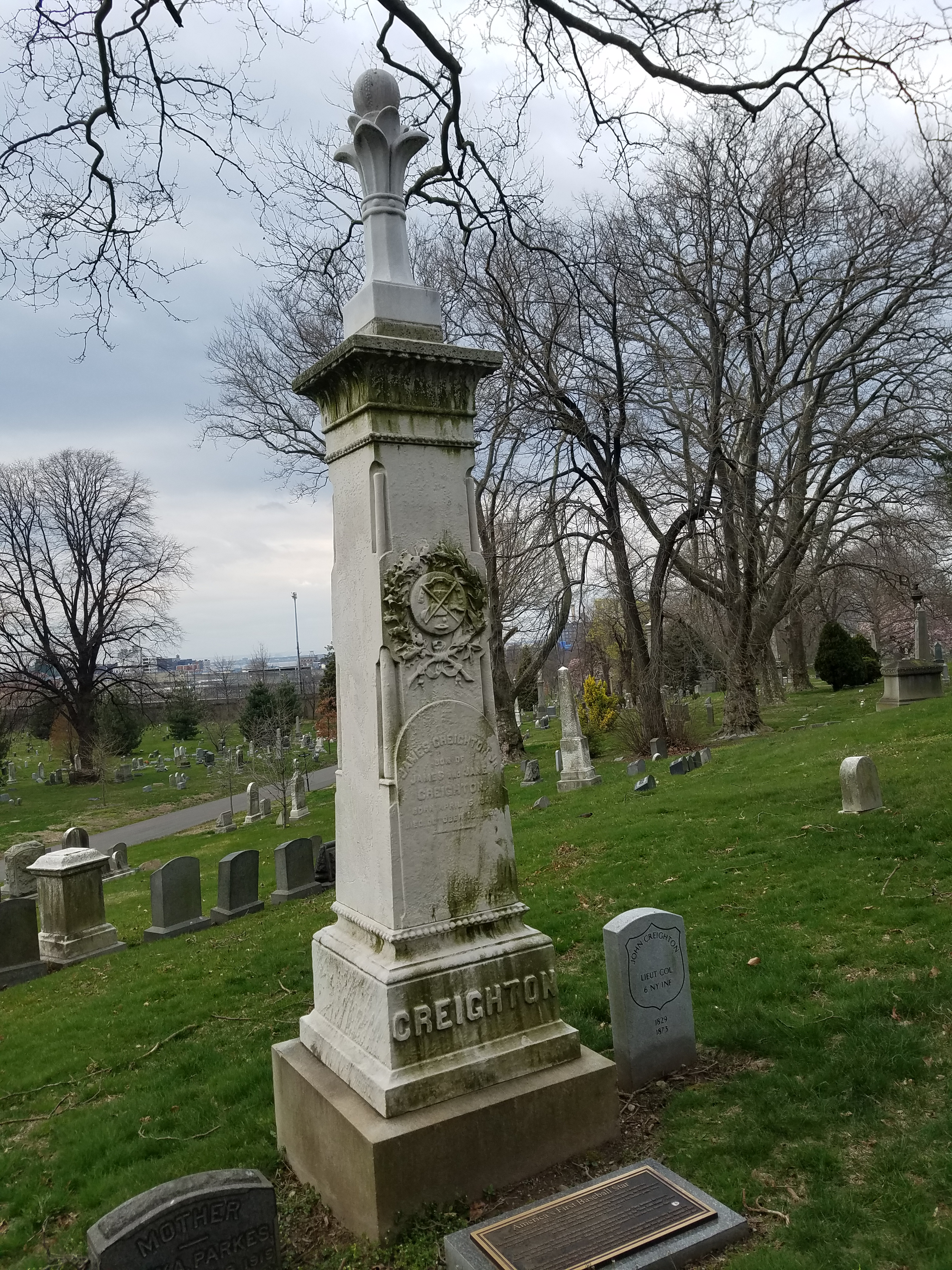
Jim Creighton monument at Green-Wood Cemetery

However, subsequent research indicates that Creighton's death by hitting a home run was fabricated years later to dramatize his martyrdom. "Dying while hitting a long home run is a great story; it's just not true," said Tom Shieber, senior curator of the National Baseball Hall of Fame. Shieber researched original news sources and found no references to Creighton hitting a home run in that game. (In fact, he hit four doubles that game.) The death-by-home-run myth was popularized, and probably started, five decades later by Chapman. Alfred H. Spink's 1910 book The National Game quoted Chapman as saying, "I was present at the game between the Excelsiors and the Unions [sic] of Morrisiana at which Jim Creighton injured himself. He did it in hitting out a home run. When he had crossed the rubber [i.e., home plate] he turned to George Flanley [sic] and said, 'I must have snapped my belt.'" Countless historians have refuted this legend, but it has taken root as factual.

Later research has suggested that Creighton's hernia was chronic, and that the tremendous workload from baseball and cricket contributed to worsening the hernia. In that era, balls and strikes were not called, and batters who could not hit Creighton's rapid deliveries adapted by refusing to swing at good pitches, forcing Creighton to throw well over 300 pitches per match. Pitching with great force and the exaggerated body contortions necessary to achieve high velocity exacerbated his condition.

Creighton's death caused concern in the sports world that public perceptions of baseball and cricket would focus on the inherent dangers of their play, hurting the sports' popularity. Though it is generally accepted that Creighton fatally injured himself while playing baseball, it was reported that the Excelsior president, Dr. Joseph Jones, made comments during the National Association convention of 1862 that constituted an attempt to "correct" this notion. He claimed that Creighton had suffered the injury, instead, while playing cricket in a match on October 7. Later research claims that Dr. Jones' assertions are correct; Creighton had died of a "strangulated intestine", and did not hit a home run during his final game. Dr. Jones' remarks have been interpreted as his attempt to save baseball's image, and its nearly equal standing with cricket, as well as his club's legacy after losing their best player. Baseball at the time was constantly "looking forward", and Creighton's death provided the sport with a certain mythology and much-needed nostalgia.

== Legacy ==
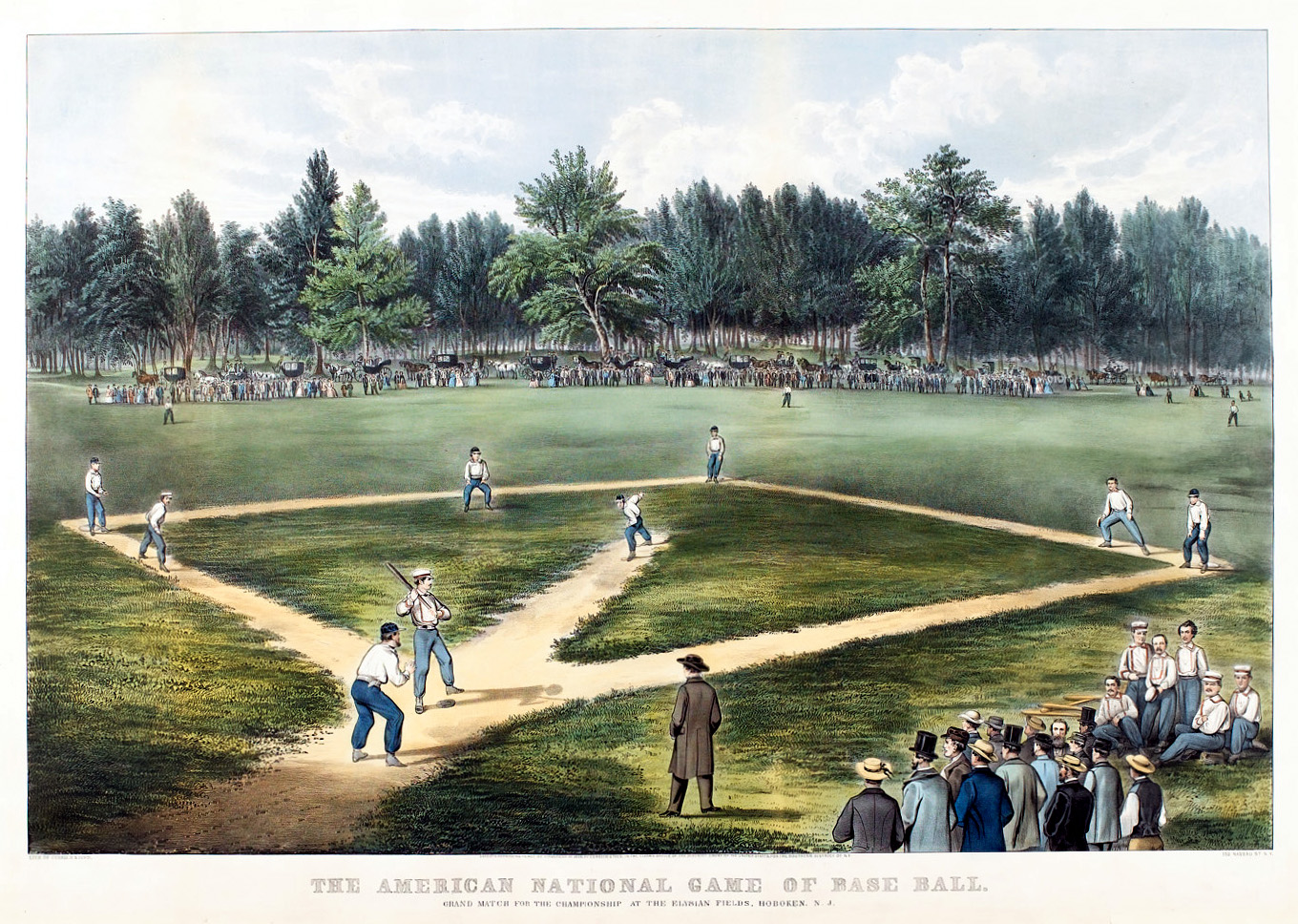
Early baseball game depicted at Elysian Fields, Hoboken (Currier & Ives lithograph). Researchers have observed that this illustration represents a "fantasy" lineup which includes an image of the deceased Jim Creighton pitching.

Baseball writer John Thorn commented in his book, Baseball in the Garden of Eden: The Secret History of the Early Game, that Creighton "was baseball's first hero, and I believe, the most important player not inducted into the Baseball Hall of Fame."

At the time, the sport of cricket was the most popular team sport in the United States, but Creighton and the Excelsiors had brought considerable attention to baseball. Creighton's popularity grew substantially after his death. In the following decade, clubs began honoring him by naming themselves after him, and others paid tribute by visiting his gravesite. As long as twenty years later, though the public adored their star pitchers, comparisons to Creighton would inevitably emerge. It was not considered controversial to compliment a pitcher with the caveat that he "warn't no Creighton." For years following his death, the Excelsiors' program included a portrait of their club with Creighton, shrouded in black, featured prominently in the center.

Creighton's indirect legacy is perhaps most profoundly seen in what is now considered a fundamental component of the game: the called ball and the walk. Neither existed during Creighton's lifetime, but his many imitators, who pitched with Creighton's velocity but not his control, prompted batters to stand at the plate without swinging for lengthy intervals, waiting for a pitch within reach. Consequently, the sport's then-governing body, the National Association of Base Ball Players, introduced a rule for the 1864 season that penalized pitchers who repeatedly failed to deliver "good balls": the called ball, three of which gave the batter a free pass to first base.

Many think that the rule in reference to pitching will greatly promote the attractiveness of the game... The time will come when slow, twisting balls, pitched with skill and judgment, will supersede the rifle-shooter of would-be Creightons. The fast pitching system is “played out”. Spectators have become disgusted with waiting hour after hour to see three or four innings played, the pitcher and catcher tired from over-work, the batsman annoyed and irritated from waiting for good balls, the fieldsmen idle and cross for want of something to do, and all the “vim” and spirit of the game being lost, because “we want to show ‘em what a bully swift pitcher we’ve got”.

These new rules, in this respect, practically take the most effective part of swift pitching out of the hands of pitchers; for, to tell the truth, not a solitary instance of fair pitching, that was very swift, have we seen since Creighton died.

== Posthumous postscripts ==
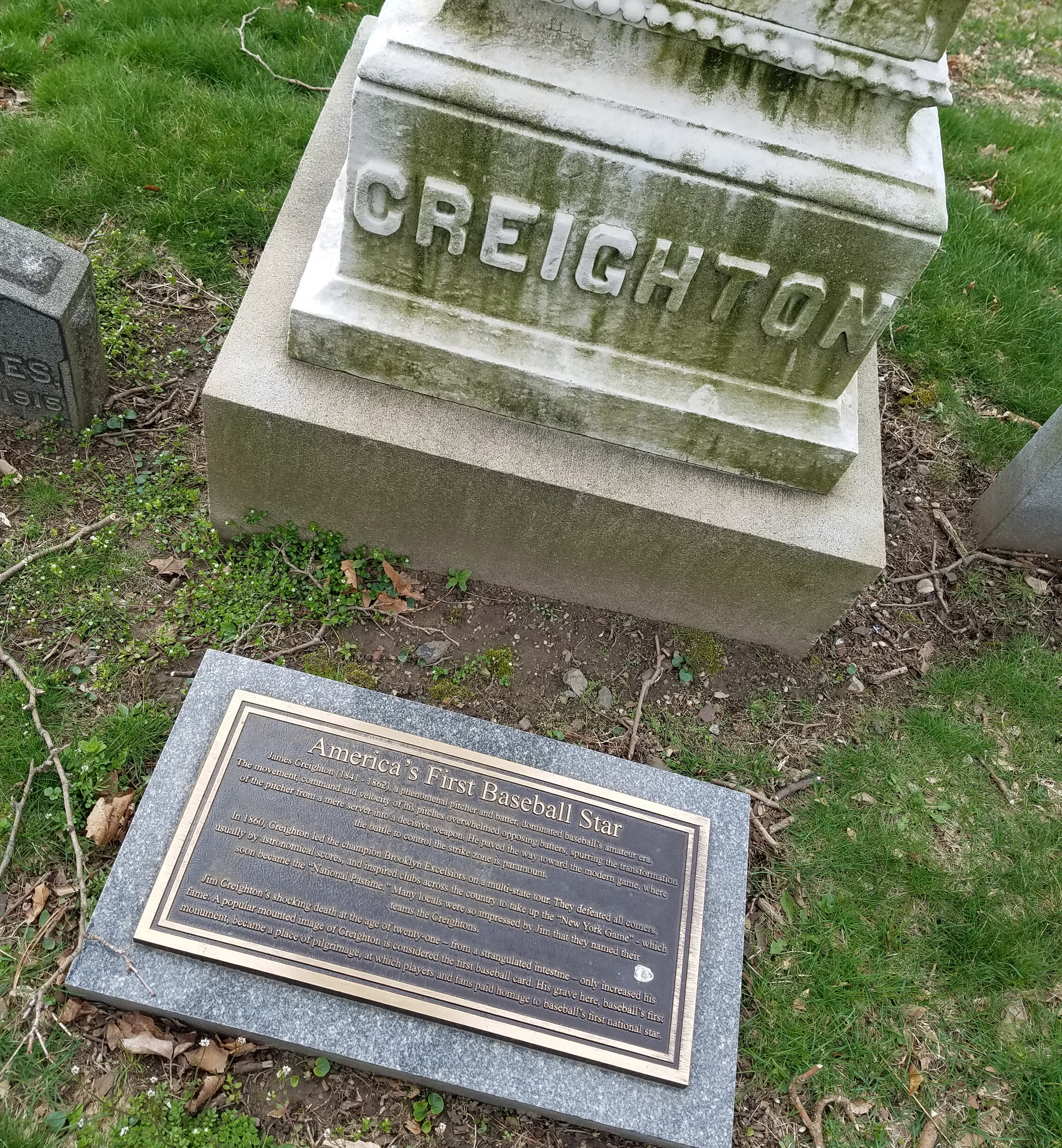
Jim Creighton commemorative plaque at Green-Wood Cemetery

Creighton was buried in Brooklyn's Green-Wood Cemetery. His gravesite was marked by a 12-foot marble obelisk crowned with a large marble baseball. However, the finial went missing and was presumed stolen in the late 19th or early 20th century. In 2014, after a successful funding campaign to restore the monument, a replica of the original finial was installed and unveiled during a public ceremony.

The television series The Simpsons made reference to Creighton in the Season 3 episode "Homer at the Bat", where Mr. Burns has him pegged as the right fielder for his company's softball team. His assistant Smithers has to point out that all the players Mr. Burns had selected are long dead, making reference in particular to Creighton by saying "In fact, your right fielder has been dead for 130 years."

== Bibliography ==
- Gilbert, Thomas W. (2015). Playing First: Early Baseball Lives at Brooklyn's Green-Wood Cemetery. Green-Wood Cemetery. ISBN 978-0966343540.
- Gilbert, Thomas W. (2026). Death in the Strike Zone: The Mystery of America's First Baseball Hero. Godine. ISBN 978-1567927597.
- Ryczek, William J. (1998). When Johnny came sliding home: the post-Civil War baseball boom, 1865-1870. McFarland & Company. ISBN 9780786405145.
- Spink, Alfred Henry (2000) [1911]. The National Game. Southern Illinois University Press. ISBN 9780809323043.
- Terry, James L. (2002). Long Before the Dodgers: Baseball in Brooklyn, 1855-1884. McFarland & Company. ISBN 9780786412297.
- Thorn, John (2012). Baseball in the Garden of Eden: The Secret History of the Early Game (reprint, illustrated ed.). Simon & Schuster. ISBN 9780743294041.
