= Putnam Grounds (Brooklyn) =

Baseball park in Brooklyn, New York

Putnam Grounds in Brooklyn, New York is a sporting ground which was the home of the Brooklyn Putnams. It was also the site of the National Association of Base Ball Players championship in 1860, serving as neutral ground for the game between the Brooklyn Atlantics and the Brooklyn Excelsiors. The game was suspended during the fifth inning due to the unruly crowd.
