= Edward Copland =

Mayor of Brooklyn, New York

Mayor of Brooklyn, New York
- In office 23 April 1849 – 22 April 1850
- Preceded by: Francis B. Stryker
- Succeeded by: Samuel Smith

City Clerk of Brooklyn, New York
- In office 6 May 1844 – 22 April 1849
- Preceded by: Alfred G. Stevens
- Succeeded by: William M. Boerum

Personal details
- Born: 30 May 1793 Manhattan, New York, US
- Died: 18 June 1859 (aged 66) Brooklyn, New York, US
- Resting place: Cemetery of the Evergreens, Brooklyn, New York, US
- Party: Whig (before 1854); Republican (from 1854)
- Spouse(s): Jane Ann Patten (m. 1818–1829) Anna E. Clarke (m. 1850–1859)
- Children: 3
- Education: Columbia College
- Occupation: Businessman

Edward Copland (Note: Copland's name is frequently spelled as "Copeland" in news accounts and official records.) (30 May 1793 – 18 June 1859) was an American businessman and politician from Brooklyn, New York. A Whig, he served as Brooklyn's city clerk from 1844 to 1849 and the city's mayor from 1849 to 1850.

== Early life ==
Edward Copland was born in Manhattan, New York on 30 May 1793, the son of George Copland and Margaret (Robison) Copland. He was raised and educated in Manhattan and received his Bachelor of Arts degree from Columbia College in 1809. He subsequently settled in Brooklyn, where he established himself as a retail grocer.

=== Family ===
In May 1818, Copland married Jane Ann Patten. They were married until her death in 1829 and were the parents of a son, John Mount Copland, and a daughter, Jane Copland. In December 1850, Copland married Anna E. Clarke. They were married until his death, and she died in June 1899. With his second wife, Copland was the father of a son, Edward Copland Jr.

== Career ==
Copland came to public notice in the 1820s, when he made speeches on behalf of the Greeks during the Greek War of Independence. In the early 1830s, he spoke in favor of the Poles during the November Uprising against the Russian Empire. Copland became active in politics as a Whig and served as chairman of the party in Brooklyn. When Brooklyn was a village, he served as a trustee and as president of the board of trustees. In 1834, he declined a Whig nomination for a seat in the United States House of Representatives. Brooklyn was incorporated as a city in 1834, and Copland served as municipal judge in 1839 and 1840.

In 1844, Copland was appointed Brooklyn's city clerk, and he served until 1849, when he was elected mayor. He was the successful Whig nominee for the mayoralty in 1849 and served a one year term, April 1849 to April 1850. After leaving the mayor's office, Copland served for several years as a member of the city's board of education, and he became a Republican after the mid-1850s demise of the Whig Party. He continued his business ventures, including real estate speculation; as Brooklyn became more urbanized, he was one of the purchasers of the Lefferts Farm, which he subdivided into several hundred building lots and sold at auction. In the 1850s, he served as president of the Central Bank of Brooklyn. Other enterprises in which he took part included the Lafayette Fire Insurance Company, of which he was a director. The Cemetery of the Evergreens was incorporated in 1849, and Copland was a longtime trustee and vice president.

Copland died in Brooklyn on 18 June 1859. He was buried at Cemetery of the Evergreens.
