= Francis B. Stryker =

American carpenter and politician

Francis Burdett Stryker (December 11, 1811 – January 14, 1892) was an American carpenter, politician, and Mayor of Brooklyn.

== Life ==
Stryker was born on December 11, 1811, in Brooklyn, New York. His father, Burdett Stryker, was a butcher with a stand in the market on James Street.

Stryker attended Erasmus Hall in Flatbush. When he was 14, shortly after his father died, he became an apprentice for Jeremiah Wells, a carpenter on Poplar Street and chief engineer of the village fire department. He finished his apprenticeship and worked as a journeyman carpenter. In 1838, he was elected one of the city's three tax collectors, an office he held for a year. In 1839, he worked as a carpenter for his brother Burdett. In 1840, he was elected Sheriff of Kings County as a Whig, even though his father was a Democrat. He served as Sheriff for the next three years, at which point he returned to carpentry.

In 1846, Stryker was elected Mayor of Brooklyn as a Whig and was re-elected to the office in 1847 and 1848. During his first term, Washington Park in Fort Greene was bought and erected by the city. In 1848, a cholera epidemic broke out in the city, brought over by sick Irish immigrants who settled there. Against the advice of his health officials, he personally went through the affected city wards and helped take care of the sick. He appointed himself de facto Health Commissioner and used his own money to pay for supplies and medicine. In 1849, he was elected County Clerk, an office he held for the next three years.

After Stryker's term as County Clerk expired, he joined the newly formed Republican Party and was their first candidate for Mayor in 1856. He lost the election to Samuel S. Powell. Four years later, he was appointed Superintendent of Sewers, an office he held until 1875. In 1872, he unsuccessfully ran for Register as an Independent, losing to Hugh McLaughlin. He had no regular business after 1875, and while he made a large fortune over the years he lost it all giving bad loans to friends. He was unmarried, and by the time he died he was living with his brother Burdett's widow.

Stryker died at home on January 14, 1892. He was buried in Green-Wood Cemetery.

Political offices
Preceded by Thomas G. Talmage	Mayor of Brooklyn; 1846–1848	Succeeded by Edward Copland
