= 1854 in sports =

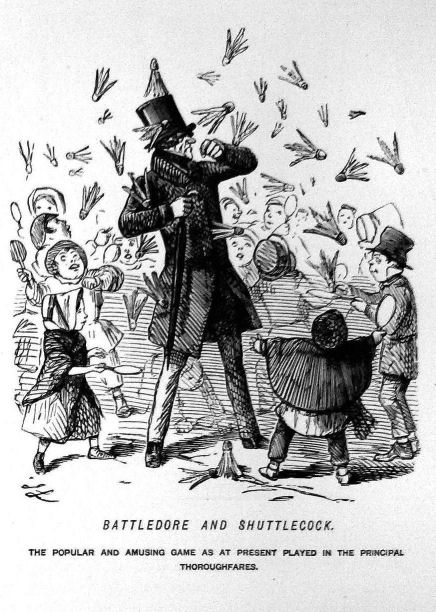
A 19th-century illustration depicting people playing battledore and shuttlecock

1854 in sports describes the year's events in world sport.

== Baseball ==
Events

- The Knickerbockers adopt some rule changes agreed in conference by their delegates with those of the Gothams and Eagles.
- The Eagles win their first two matches, with the Knickerbockers in mid-November, 21–4 and 22–21. The latter is the first time one team scores 21 but loses in "equal innings".

== Boxing ==
Events

- Harry Broome retains the Championship of England but there is no record of any fights involving him in 1854.
- American champion John Morrissey becomes involved in Democratic politics in New York City and from this develops a bitter rivalry with William Poole, also known as "Bill the Butcher", another prizefighter. Poole is also the leader of a notorious gang called the Bowery Boys who plan to seize ballot boxes and rig an election. Morrissey and others are hired to prevent this.
- 14 February — Tom Paddock defeats Harry Poulson at Mildenhall in 102 rounds; this is the third and effectively deciding bout between the two.
- 18 July — Paddock defeats Aaron Jones at Long Reach in 121 rounds.
- 26 July — Poole and Morrisey agree to fight each other at Amos Dock, New York, to settle their dispute. Morrissey is badly beaten and, worried about the presence of Poole's supporters, concedes defeat.
- 27 August — Tom Paddock issues challenges to English Champion Harry Broome and to former champion William Perry but both refuse. Paddock responds by claiming the Championship of England, but he is not recognised at this time.
- 20 October — Morrissey declines a challenge for his American title from retired former champion Tom Hyer. It will be exactly four years until Morrissey defends his title again.

== Cricket ==
Events

- The follow-on differential is reduced to 80 (or 60 in one day).

England

- Most runs – Jemmy Dean 516 @ 16.12 (HS 99)
- Most wickets – John Wisden 106 @ 9.83 (BB 8–41)

== Football ==
Events

- Dublin University Football Club is founded by students at Trinity College. It is a rugby union club still based in the college grounds and plays in the AIB League. It is the world's oldest extant football club (all codes) in terms of continuous existence.

== Horse racing ==
England

- Grand National – Bourton
- 1,000 Guineas Stakes – Virago
- 2,000 Guineas Stakes – The Hermit
- The Derby – Andover
- The Oaks – Mincemeat
- St. Leger Stakes – Knight of St George

== Rowing ==
The Boat Race

- 8 April — Oxford wins the 12th Oxford and Cambridge Boat Race, last contested in 1852
