= Edward A. Lambert =

American politician

Edward Augustus Lambert (June 10, 1813 – September 7, 1885) was an American politician and Mayor of Brooklyn.

== Life ==
Lambert was born on June 10, 1813, in New York City, New York. His father, master of a merchant ship, was lost at sea with his vessel when Lambert was young. He then began to work on his own from the age of 12, first as a clerk for an importing house. Then in 1832, he began working in the stationery business.

Lambert moved to Brooklyn in 1846. In 1849, he was elected alderman of the Fourth Ward as a Democrat. In 1850, he was elected alderman of the new Tenth Ward and became president of the board of aldermen. In 1852, he was elected Mayor of Brooklyn, serving in that office from 1853 to 1854. While Mayor, he oversaw the development of horse railroads, introduced a permanent water supply for the city, and rigorously enforced the Sunday Law. In the spring of 1854, he spent six weeks in Europe for health reasons only to return to Brooklyn in the midst of a Know-Nothing Riot between the Irish and members of the Know-Nothing Party. He managed to suppress the riot.

During the American Civil War, Lambert promoted for volunteers early on and called the first great war-meeting in Fort Greene in April 1861. In 1862, he was appointed recording-secretary and member of a committee that provided for the reception, care, and relief of wounded and sick soldiers. When the Sanitary Fair was organized in 1864, he served as chairman of one committee and was a member of another. He was at one point president of the Craftsman Life Insurance Company, and later worked in a wholesale stationery business. In 1878 he began experience financial troubles, and by the time he died his health and spirit were broken.

Lambert became a member of the Central Presbyterian Church of New York in 1830. In 1831, he was one of the 32 organizers of the Third Free Presbyterian Church of New York. The church was later known as the Houston Street Presbyterian Church, with Rev. Samuel D. Buchard as the pastor, and then moved to Thirteenth Street. When Lambert moved to Brooklyn, he joined the South Presbyterian Church there. In 1857, he helped organize the Park Presbyterian Church, later known as the Lafayette Avenue Presbyterian Church, with Theodore L. Cuyler as the pastor. He was an elder for the Houston Street Church, the South Presbyterian Church, and the Lafayette Avenue Church, and served as a Commissioner to the General Assemblies of 1855, 1862, 1866, 1868, and 1870.

Lambert died at home on September 7, 1885. He was buried in Green-Wood Cemetery.

Political offices
Preceded by Conklin Brush	Mayor of Brooklyn; 1853–1854	Succeeded by George Hall
