= Joe Start =

American baseball player (1842–1927)

- First baseman
- Born: October 14, 1842; New York City, U.S.
- Died: March 27, 1927 (aged 84); Providence, Rhode Island, U.S.
- Batted: Left Threw: Left

MLB debut
- May 18, 1871, for the New York Mutuals

Last MLB appearance
- July 9, 1886, for the Washington Nationals

MLB statistics
- Batting average: .299
- Hits: 1,417
- Runs: 852
- Stats at Baseball Reference

Teams
- National Association of Base Ball Players Enterprise of Brooklyn (1859–1861) Brooklyn Atlantics (1862–1870) League player New York Mutuals (1871–1876) Hartford Dark Blues (1877) Chicago White Stockings (1878) Providence Grays (1879–1885) Washington Nationals (1886) League manager New York Mutuals (1873)

Joseph Start (October 14, 1842 – March 27, 1927), nicknamed "Old Reliable", was one of the most durable regulars of baseball's earliest era, and one of the top first basemen of his time. He began his playing career in 1859, before the formation of organized leagues and before ballplayers received payment for their services. He continued to play regularly until 1886, when he was 43. Start's career spanned countless innovations that transformed the game in fundamental ways, but he adjusted and continued to play at a high level for almost three decades. Baseball historian Bill Ryczek said that Start "was the last of the pre–Civil War players to hang up his cleats."

== Amateur era ==
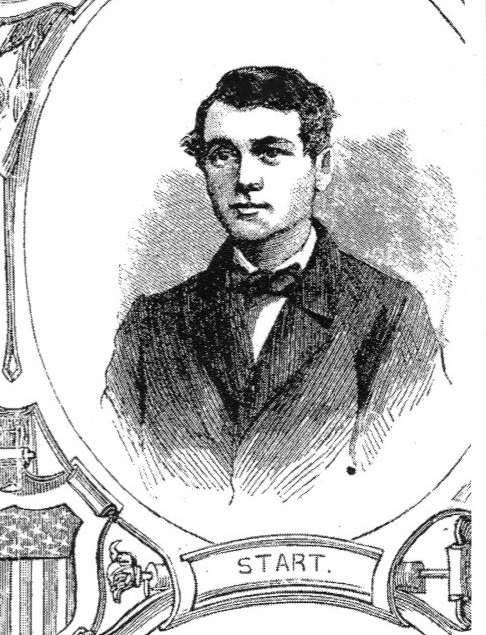
Joe Start, detail of woodcut depicting the 1865 Brooklyn Atlantics, published in Harper's Weekly

The New York City-born Start played first base and third base for the amateur Enterprise Club of Brooklyn from 1859 to 1861, before the advent of salaried ballplaying. After the 1861 season, he joined the powerful Atlantic Club of Brooklyn, with whom he would remain through the 1870 season. The club featured some of the best players of the day: Dickey Pearce, Bob Ferguson, Lipman Pike, George Hall, and George Zettlein, all of whom went on to play in the major leagues. None except Pearce were with the Atlantic longer than Start.

The Atlantics were undefeated in 1864 and 1865.

During this decade, unofficial payment for exceptional players became common and the practice was eventually legitimized.

== Defeat of the Invincible Cincinnati Red Stockings ==
Start made a pivotal contribution to one of the most celebrated games of the late Amateur Era. The all-salaried Cincinnati Red Stockings had 81 consecutive wins across two seasons when they faced off against the Atlantics on June 14, 1870, at Brooklyn's Capitoline Grounds. After nine innings, the game was even at 5-5, and the Atlantics left the field in the apparent acceptance of a tie outcome. However, the umpire ordered the teams to continue playing until the game was decided. In the top of the 11th, Cincinnati scored twice to take the lead, 7-5. In the bottom of the 11th, Atlantics third baseman Charlie Smith singled. Start then hit a booming triple, driving in Smith. Catcher Bob Ferguson drove in Start with a single to tie the game 7-7. Ferguson scored the winning run on a throwing error by Cincinnati shortstop George Wright on a hard-hit grounder by George Hall, ending the Red Stockings' legendary winning streak.

In an 1895 post-retirement interview with sportswriter Tim Murnane, Start revealed a little-known secret: “We wanted to stop playing when the score was five each, but [Cincinnati team leader] Harry Wright wouldn’t have it. You see, the Atlantics were playing on the co-operative plan, and another game meant $300 or $400 for each man.” Murnane confessed: “This was the first time I ever knew why the Brooklyn men left the field after the ninth inning, and I was present at the game.”

== Professional era ==
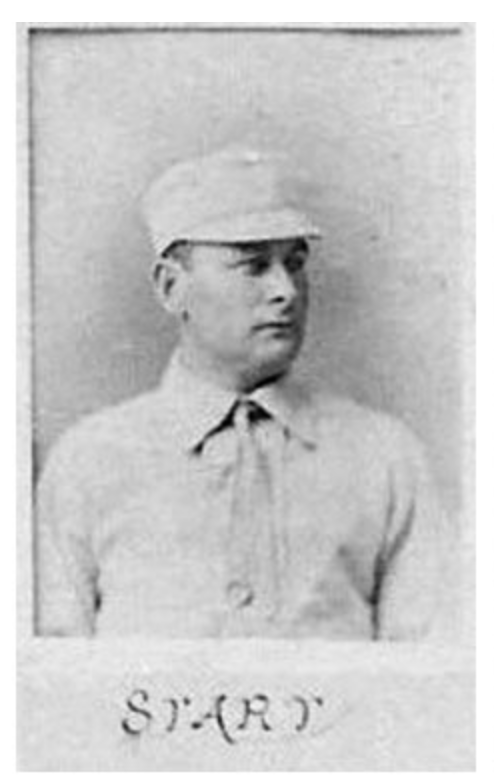
Start as a member of the 1879 National League champs the Providence Grays

In 1871, Start joined the new—and fully professional—National Association (NA), playing for the New York Mutuals and, at age 28, hitting a career-high .360, second highest on the team. He also hit the team's only home run that season. In 1873 he served as the Mutuals' field leader (a pre-managerial position) for 25 games.

The NA failed after five years. When the National League (NL) was formed in 1876, the Mutuals joined, and Start remained with the team. However, the Mutuals were a poor team in 1876, and after refusing to finish their season schedule because of a financial shortfall, they were expelled from the NL. The following year Start joined the Hartford Dark Blues, and in 1878 moved over to the Chicago White Stockings. 1878 was possibly Start's best season with the bat. He led the league with 100 hits and 125 total bases. He came close to the league lead with 12 doubles, 5 triples, and one home run. His 58 runs that year were second in the league. These statistics came in only 285 at bats, and at the age of 35, long after most players have begun to decline.

From 1879 until 1885, when he was 42, Start held down first base for the Providence Grays and continued to hit well; he also served as team captain, a role that provided field leadership before the establishment of team managers. Start's 1879 Providence team won the NL flag, and in 1884 they won what is considered the first inter-league championship, beating the New York Metropolitans of the American Association.

== Retirement ==
After Providence left the NL following the 1885 season, in 1886 Start signed with the Washington Nationals for what proved to be his final season. He only played 31 games for the Nationals, did not hit well, and retired from professional play. After this final sub-par season, his lifetime Major League batting average dipped below .300, to .299. For the final nine seasons of Start's career, he was the oldest player on any major league roster. Start played the final game of his professional career on July 9, 1886.

Over his full major league career Start amassed 1,417 hits, 852 runs, and 544 RBI in NL and NA play. He logged a .299 batting average, a .322 on-base percentage, and a .367 slugging percentage. These totals do not include his first twelve pre-league years, during which cumulative player statistics were not recorded. In addition, since Start's lifetime totals were achieved in much shorter seasons than today's professionals play, they tend to under-represent his sustained quality as a ballplayer.

== Post-baseball life ==
After his retirement from the game, Start returned to Rhode Island and operated the Hillside Hotel, near Pawtuxet, and later the Lakewood Inn, in Warwick. His wife, Angeline, died in February, 1927, and Start died one month later, in Providence, Rhode Island, at age 84.
