= Average and over =

Average and over, often abbreviated A&O, refers to two baseball statistics used in the 1850s and 1860s by the National Association of Base Ball Players. They referred to a player's average performance over a number of games, and were among the first baseball statistics ever reported and tracked. The term and the reporting method were borrowed from cricket.

The basic statistic was presented as a whole number (the "average") and a remainder (the "over").

Average and over (runs) was the average number of runs a player scored per game, expressed as a whole number and a remainder. If a player scored 29 runs in nine games, his average runs per game would be three, with two left over. This would be written as 3,2.

Average and over (hands lost) was the number of times a player was called out, divided by the number of games he played, once again expressed as a whole number and a remainder. If a player was called out 17 times in eight games, his average and over for hands lost would be 2,1.

When statistics for hits and total bases were introduced in 1868, their totals were expressed in the same way.

In 1870, most teams began presenting these statistics in decimal form. Continuing the examples above, the player with 29 runs in nine games would have this reported as an average of 3.22 Runs per game. The man called out 17 times in eight games would have an average Hands Lost of 2.12.
