= Thomas G. Talmage =

American politician

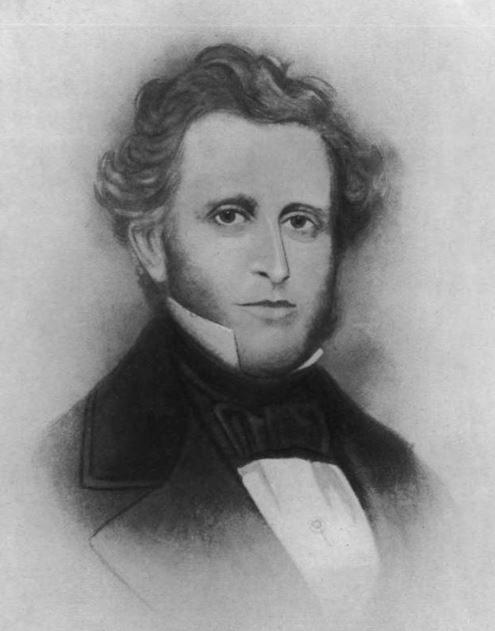
- Portrait of Talmage from A History of Long Island From Its Earliest Settlement to the Present Time, 1902

6th Mayor of Brooklyn
- In office 1845–1845
- Preceded by: Joseph Sprague
- Succeeded by: Francis B. Stryker

Member of the New York State Assembly
- In office January 1, 1837 – December 31, 1837

Personal details
- Born: Thomas Goyn Talmage; October 22, 1801 Somerville, New Jersey
- Died: May 4, 1863 (aged 61) Brooklyn, New York
- Party: Democratic
- Spouse(s): Dorothy Miller (m. 1823; died 1834) Sarah Maria Van Brunt (m. 1835; died 1843) Harriet Jarolemon Stone (m. 1848)
- Relations: Thomas De Witt Talmage (nephew); John Van Nest Talmage (nephew)
- Children: 7, including Tunis
- Parent(s): Goyn Talmage; Magdalene Terhune

Thomas Goyn Talmage (October 22, 1801 – May 4, 1863) was an American politician and Mayor of Brooklyn.

== Early life ==
Talmage was born on October 22, 1801, in Somerville, New Jersey, to Goyn Talmage and Magdalene (née Terhune) Talmage, a descendant of an old Long Island family. Among his sisters was Mertine Talmaage, the wife of Edward Patterson and mother of Judge Edward Patterson. Through his brother David Thomas Talmage, he was uncle to clergyman Thomas De Witt Talmage and John Van Nest Talmage. His father was the fourth son of Maj. Thomas Talmage and Mary (née McCoy) Talmage.

== Career ==
In 1819, Talmage moved to New York City and began working as a clerk for merchant Abraham Van Ness. From 1823 to 1836, he worked in the wholesale grocery business. In 1827, he was elected Alderman of the First Ward as a Democrat. He initially resided on Stone Street. In 1832, he moved to Greenwich Village in the Ninth Ward. He served in the New York State Assembly in 1837 as a New York County representative. From 1838 to 1839, he was a member of the New York City Common Council and served as President of the Board of Aldermen.

In 1840, Talmage moved to Brooklyn. He served in that city's board of aldermen from 1842 to 1845, first representing the 8th Ward and then the 6th Ward. In 1845, he was elected Mayor of Brooklyn, and under his mayoral administration, the Brooklyn City Hall was built. In 1846, Governor Silas Wright appointed him County Judge. He later became Loan Commissioner of the United States Deposit Fund for Kings County. In the late 1850s, he was an early and major promoter of Prospect Park, managed to get the State Legislature to support the creation of the park, and was one of the first three park commissioners. After his third marriage, he moved to Gowanus, a neighborhood he helped develop as Mayor. He became President of the Broadway Rail Road Company in 1858, and was a member of the Chamber of Commerce.

== Personal life ==
In 1823, Talmage married Dorothy Miller (1805–1834), daughter of Col. David Miller and a sister of U.S. Senator from New Jersey, Jacob W. Miller. Their children were:

- Mary Louise Talmage.
- David Miller Talmage (1827–1900), who married Sarah Jane Stone, a daughter of Jonas Stone, in 1846.
- William H. Talmage (1829–1873), who married Isabella W. Carothers, a daughter of Jesse Carothers, in 1853.
- Tunis Van Pelt Talmage (1832–1909), who served as supervisor, alderman, and assemblyman, and was twice an unsuccessful candidate for Mayor.

In 1835, he married his second wife, Sarah Maria Van Brunt (1808–1843), a daughter of Cornelius Van Brunt and Jannetje (née Adriance) Van Brunt. Their children were:

- Thomas Adriance Talmage (1837–1861), who married Mary J. Davidson in 1860.
- Jane Elizabeth Talmage (1839–1930), who married the Rev. Henry V. Voorhees in 1859.

After Sarah died in 1843, he married his third wife, Harriet (née Jarolemon) Stone (d. 1892), daughter of wealthy Judge Tunis Jarolemon and widow of Jonas Stone, in 1848. Harriet was the mother of Sarah Jane Stone, the wife of Talmage's eldest son David. They had one child:

- Frederick Tunis Talmage (1849–1874).

Talmage died at his home in Brooklyn from pneumonia on May 4, 1863. He was buried in Green-Wood Cemetery.

Political offices
| Preceded by Joseph Sprague | Mayor of Brooklyn; 1845 | Succeeded by Francis B. Stryker |
