= Excelsior of Brooklyn =

Defunct baseball team in New York

- The 1860 Brooklyn Excelsior Base Ball Club
- Full name: Excelsior Base Ball Club of Brooklyn
- Nicknames: Jolly Young Bachelor Base Ball Club
- Founded: December 8, 1854 at Florence's Hotel, Broadway and Howards Streets in NY
- Ground: Carroll Park (1854-1859); South End of Court Street Red Hook (1859-1870); Presidents; Jeremiah Nelson Tappan (1854-1857); Dr. Joseph Bainbridge Jones (1857-1865); Richard K. Cooke (1865-1866); Dr. Joseph Bainbridge Jones (1866-1870)
- League: NABBP

The Brooklyn Excelsiors (a.k.a. Excelsior Base Ball Club of Brooklyn) were an amateur baseball team that played in Brooklyn, New York. Formed in 1854, the club featured future pitching stars Jim Creighton, Asa Brainard, and Candy Cummings.

The team is known for originating the "Brooklyn-style" baseball cap, precursor to the modern cap. They also were the first baseball club to undertake a long-distance tour to compete against clubs based outside their home region.

Their uniform consisted of bow ties, black Baseball caps with white brims, dark pants, white shirts with a button-on shield sporting a large black 'E', and a belt with "Excelsior" written in Blackletter.

The club motto was "Ever Onward!"

== 1860 Championship Season ==
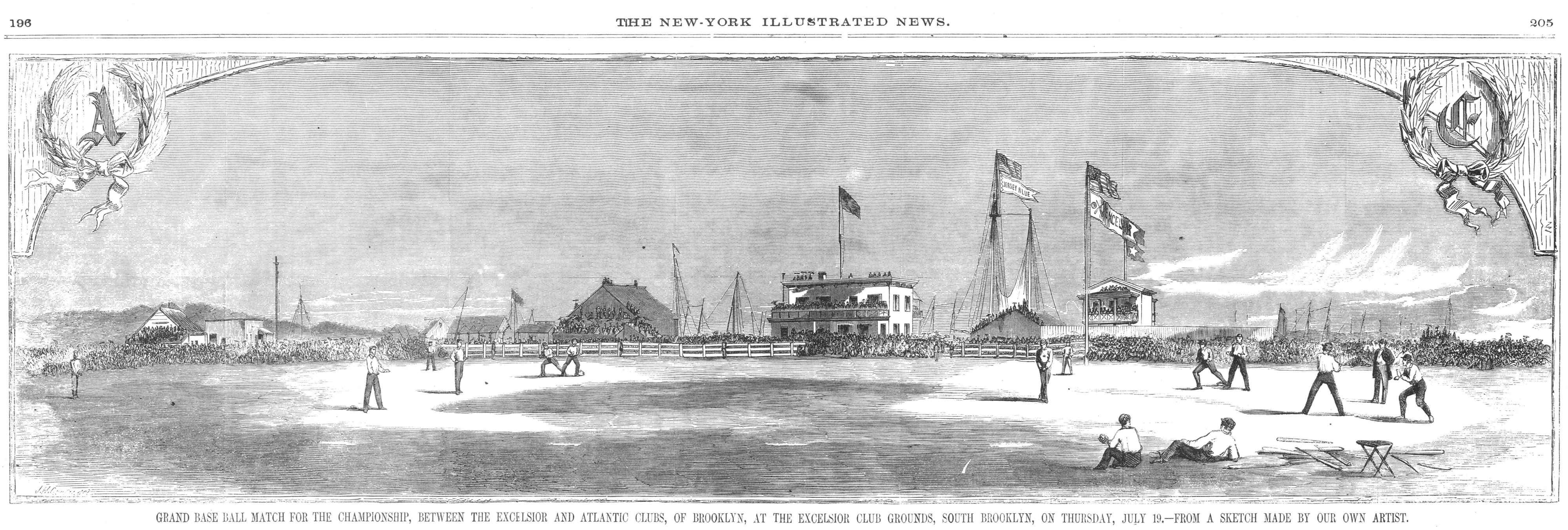
Grand base ball match for the championship, between the Excelsior and Atlantic clubs, of Brooklyn, at the Excelsior Grounds, South Brooklyn, on Thursday, July 19, 1860

In 1860, the Excelsior club made a now-famous tour around New York and large cities in surrounding states. They defeated the Champion Club of Albany, the Victory Club of Troy, the Buffalo Niagaras, and the powerful Brooklyn Atlantics. Besides establishing the tradition of ball clubs traveling long distances to compete with other clubs, the tour helped advance the New York rules-based game's popularity outside the New York region.

In 1860 the Excelsiors compiled a record of 19 wins and two losses, and were champions of the National Association of Base Ball Players, finishing in a draw with the Brooklyn Atlantics Club. However, the Atlantics were the accepted champions.

During the 1860 season, the Excelsiors began wearing an ancestor of the modern, snug-fitting baseball cap, including a long visor and button top. The cap, which became popular by the 1900s, was known as "Brooklyn-style", and was the predominant baseball cap until the 1940s.

== The Club After 1860 ==
In 1861, due to the departure of many young club members who went to fight the Civil War, the Excelsior played only one game, against the Eureka Club of Newark, NJ, in August. (The exact date and outcome are unknown.)

The Excelior played more games in 1862, and remained a competitive team. Following the tragic death of their 21-year-old star pitcher Jim Creighton in October of that year, the club became less dominant. Although the club remained active through 1870, they eventually drifted into irrelevance and failed to compete against increasingly powerful opponents in the pre-professional era.
