= 1875 Washington Nationals season =

1875 Washington Nationals
- League: National Association of Professional Base Ball Players
- Ballpark: Olympics Grounds
- City: Washington D.C.
- Record: 4–23 (.148)
- League place: 9th
- Managers: Holly Hollingshead, Bill Parks

The Washington Nationals played their first and only season of professional baseball in 1875 as a member of the National Association of Professional Base Ball Players. They finished ninth in the league with a record of 4–23. It is uncertain if this team is related to the 1872 team of the same name or other Washington-based teams of the era. The National Association folded after the completion of the 1875 season.

== Regular season ==
=== Season standings ===
National Association	W	L	T	Pct.	GB
Boston Red Stockings	71	8	3	.884	—
Philadelphia Athletics	53	20	4	.714	15
Hartford Dark Blues	54	28	3	.653	18½
St. Louis Brown Stockings	39	29	2	.571	26½
Philadelphia White Stockings	37	31	2	.543	28½
Chicago White Stockings	30	37	2	.449	35
New York Mutuals	30	38	3	.444	35½
New Haven Elm Citys	7	40	—	.149	48
Washington Nationals	5	23	—	.179	40½
St. Louis Red Stockings	4	15	—	.211	37
Philadelphia Centennials	2	12	—	.143	36½
Brooklyn Atlantics	2	42	—	.045	51½
Keokuk Westerns	1	12	—	.077	37

=== Record vs. opponents ===
1875 National Association Records Sources:
Team	BOS	BR	CHI	HAR	KEO	NH	NY	PHA	PHC	PWS	SLB	SLR	WSH
Boston	—	6–0	8–2	9–1	1–0	5–1	10–0	8–2–2	4–0	6–0–1	7–2	1–0	6–0
Brooklyn	0–6	—	0–2	0–10	0–0	2–1	0–7	0–7	0–0	0–7	0–2	0–0	0–0
Chicago	2–8	2–0	—	4–6–1	4–0	2–1	3–3	1–7–1	0–0	3–7	5–5	4–0	0–0
Hartford	1–9	10–0	6–4–1	—	0–0	8–1	8–2–2	4–3–1	1–0	4–4	5–5	3–0	4–0
Keokuk	0–1	0–0	0–4	0–0	—	0–0	0–1	0–0	0–0	0–0	0–4	1–2	0–0
New Haven	1–5	1–2	1–2	1–8	0–0	—	1–5	0–7	0–1	0–4	1–2	0–0	1–4
New York	0–10	7–0	3–3	2–8–2	1–0	5–1	—	3–6	2–0	5–2	0–8–1	2–0	0–0
Philadelphia Athletics	2–8–2	7–0	7–1–1	3–4–1	0–0	7–0	6–3	—	2–1	8–2	6–1	0–0	5–0
Philadelphia Centennials	0–4	0–0	0–0	0–1	0–0	1–0	0–2	1–2	—	0–3	0–0	0–0	0–0
Philadelphia White Stockings	0–6–1	7–0	7–3	4–4	0–0	4–0	2–5	2–8	3–0	—	5–5–1	1–0	2–0
St. Louis Brown Stockings	2–7	2–0	5–5	5–5	4–0	2–1	8–0–1	1–6	0–0	5–5–1	—	2–0	3–0
St. Louis Red Stockings	0–1	0–0	0–4	0–3	2–1	0–0	0–2	0–0	0–0	0–1	0–2	—	2–1
Washington	0–6	0–0	0–0	0–4	0–0	4–1	0–0	0–5	0–0	0–2	0–3	1–2	—

=== Roster ===
1875 Washington Nationals
Roster
Pitchers: Bill Stearns; Charles Witherow; Catchers: Sam Field; Jim Gilmore; Bill McCloskey; Frank Thompson	Infielders: Art Allison; Steve Brady; John Dailey; Herm Doscher; Lou Say; Frank Sellman; Walter Terry	Outfielders: Holly Hollingshead; John Lowry; Charlie Mason; Bill Parks; Larry Ressler; Robert Stevens	Managers: Holly Hollingshead; Bill Parks

== Player stats ==
=== Batting ===
Note: G = Games played; AB = At bats; H = Hits; Avg. = Batting average; HR = Home runs; RBI = Runs batted in

Player	G	AB	H	Avg.	HR	RBI
Frank Thompson	11	41	4	.098	0	3
Art Allison	26	112	24	.214	0	3
Steve Brady	21	91	13	.143	0	3
John Dailey	27	110	20	.182	0	13
Herm Doscher	22	81	15	.185	0	5
Bill Parks	27	111	20	.180	0	6
Holly Hollingshead	19	81	20	.247	0	5
Larry Ressler	27	108	21	.194	0	5
Bill McCloskey	11	40	7	.175	0	4
Lou Say	11	38	10	.263	0	2
Charlie Mason	8	33	3	.091	0	1
John Lowry	6	22	3	.136	0	0
Walter Terry	6	22	4	.182	0	2
Sam Field	5	16	5	.313	0	1
Jim Gilmore	3	12	3	.250	0	0
Robert Stevens	1	4	1	.250	0	0
Frank Sellman	1	3	1	.333	0	0

=== Starting pitchers ===
Note: G = Games pitched; IP = Innings pitched; W = Wins; L = Losses; ERA = Earned run average; SO = Strikeouts

Player	G	IP	W	L	ERA	SO
Bill Stearns	17	141.0	1	14	4.02	3
Bill Parks	14	106.2	4	8	3.29	3
Charles Witherow	1	1.0	0	1	18.00	0

==== Relief pitchers ====
Note: G = Games pitched; W = Wins; L = Losses; SV = Saves; ERA = Earned run average; SO = Strikeouts

Player	G	W	L	SV	ERA	SO
Charlie Mason	1	0	0	0	4.50	0
