= 1875 Philadelphia Centennials season =

1875 Philadelphia Centennials
- League: National Association of Professional Base Ball Players
- Ballpark: Centennial Grounds
- City: Philadelphia, Pennsylvania
- Record: 2–12 (.143)
- League place: 11th
- Managers: Bill Craver

The Philadelphia Centennials played their first and only season of professional baseball in 1875 as a member of the National Association of Professional Base Ball Players. They finished eleventh in the league with a record of 2–12.

== Regular season ==
=== Season standings ===
| National Association | W | L | T | Pct. | GB |
|---|---|---|---|---|---|
| Boston Red Stockings | 71 | 8 | 3 | .884 | — |
| Philadelphia Athletics | 53 | 20 | 4 | .714 | 15 |
| Hartford Dark Blues | 54 | 28 | 3 | .653 | 18½ |
| St. Louis Brown Stockings | 39 | 29 | 2 | .571 | 26½ |
| Philadelphia White Stockings | 37 | 31 | 2 | .543 | 28½ |
| Chicago White Stockings | 30 | 37 | 2 | .449 | 35 |
| New York Mutuals | 30 | 38 | 3 | .444 | 35½ |
| New Haven Elm Citys | 7 | 40 | — | .149 | 48 |
| Washington Nationals | 5 | 23 | — | .179 | 40½ |
| St. Louis Red Stockings | 4 | 15 | — | .211 | 37 |
| Philadelphia Centennials | 2 | 12 | — | .143 | 36½ |
| Brooklyn Atlantics | 2 | 42 | — | .045 | 51½ |
| Keokuk Westerns | 1 | 12 | — | .077 | 37 |

=== Record vs. opponents ===
1875 National Association Records Sources:
| Team | BOS | BR | CHI | HAR | KEO | NH | NY | PHA | PHC | PWS | SLB | SLR | WSH |
|---|---|---|---|---|---|---|---|---|---|---|---|---|---|
| Boston | — | 6–0 | 8–2 | 9–1 | 1–0 | 5–1 | 10–0 | 8–2–2 | 4–0 | 6–0–1 | 7–2 | 1–0 | 6–0 |
| Brooklyn | 0–6 | — | 0–2 | 0–10 | 0–0 | 2–1 | 0–7 | 0–7 | 0–0 | 0–7 | 0–2 | 0–0 | 0–0 |
| Chicago | 2–8 | 2–0 | — | 4–6–1 | 4–0 | 2–1 | 3–3 | 1–7–1 | 0–0 | 3–7 | 5–5 | 4–0 | 0–0 |
| Hartford | 1–9 | 10–0 | 6–4–1 | — | 0–0 | 8–1 | 8–2–2 | 4–3–1 | 1–0 | 4–4 | 5–5 | 3–0 | 4–0 |
| Keokuk | 0–1 | 0–0 | 0–4 | 0–0 | — | 0–0 | 0–1 | 0–0 | 0–0 | 0–0 | 0–4 | 1–2 | 0–0 |
| New Haven | 1–5 | 1–2 | 1–2 | 1–8 | 0–0 | — | 1–5 | 0–7 | 0–1 | 0–4 | 1–2 | 0–0 | 1–4 |
| New York | 0–10 | 7–0 | 3–3 | 2–8–2 | 1–0 | 5–1 | — | 3–6 | 2–0 | 5–2 | 0–8–1 | 2–0 | 0–0 |
| Philadelphia Athletics | 2–8–2 | 7–0 | 7–1–1 | 3–4–1 | 0–0 | 7–0 | 6–3 | — | 2–1 | 8–2 | 6–1 | 0–0 | 5–0 |
| Philadelphia Centennials | 0–4 | 0–0 | 0–0 | 0–1 | 0–0 | 1–0 | 0–2 | 1–2 | — | 0–3 | 0–0 | 0–0 | 0–0 |
| Philadelphia White Stockings | 0–6–1 | 7–0 | 7–3 | 4–4 | 0–0 | 4–0 | 2–5 | 2–8 | 3–0 | — | 5–5–1 | 1–0 | 2–0 |
| St. Louis Brown Stockings | 2–7 | 2–0 | 5–5 | 5–5 | 4–0 | 2–1 | 8–0–1 | 1–6 | 0–0 | 5–5–1 | — | 2–0 | 3–0 |
| St. Louis Red Stockings | 0–1 | 0–0 | 0–4 | 0–3 | 2–1 | 0–0 | 0–2 | 0–0 | 0–0 | 0–1 | 0–2 | — | 2–1 |
| Washington | 0–6 | 0–0 | 0–0 | 0–4 | 0–0 | 4–1 | 0–0 | 0–5 | 0–0 | 0–2 | 0–3 | 1–2 | — |

=== Roster ===
1875 Philadelphia Centennials
Roster
| Pitchers: George Bechtel; Catchers: Sam Field; Tim McGinley | Infielders: John Abadie; Bill Craver; John Radcliffe; Ed Somerville; George Trenwith | Outfielders: Len Lovett; Charlie Mason; Fred Treacey; Fred Warner | Managers: Bill Craver |

== Player stats ==
=== Batting ===
Note: G = Games played; AB = At bats; H = Hits; Avg. = Batting average; HR = Home runs; RBI = Runs batted in

| Player | G | AB | H | Avg. | HR | RBI |
|---|---|---|---|---|---|---|
| Tim McGinley | 13 | 52 | 12 | .231 | 0 | 5 |
| John Abadie | 11 | 45 | 10 | .222 | 0 | 4 |
| Ed Somerville | 14 | 57 | 13 | .228 | 0 | 6 |
| Bill Craver | 14 | 65 | 18 | .277 | 0 | 5 |
| George Trenwith | 10 | 45 | 8 | .178 | 0 | 4 |
| Fred Treacey | 11 | 46 | 12 | .261 | 0 | 2 |
| Charlie Mason | 12 | 47 | 11 | .234 | 0 | 3 |
| Fred Warner | 14 | 57 | 14 | .246 | 0 | 2 |
| John Radcliff | 5 | 23 | 4 | .174 | 0 | 0 |
| Len Lovett | 6 | 21 | 5 | .238 | 0 | 2 |
| Sam Field | 3 | 11 | 1 | .091 | 0 | 0 |

=== Starting pitchers ===
Note: G = Games pitched; IP = Innings pitched; W = Wins; L = Losses; ERA = Earned run average; SO = Strikeouts

| Player | G | IP | W | L | ERA | SO |
|---|---|---|---|---|---|---|
| George Bechtel | 14 | 126.0 | 2 | 12 | 2.71 | 6 |
