= 1875 New Haven Elm Citys season =

1875 New Haven Elm Citys
- League: National Association of Professional Base Ball Players
- Ballpark: Howard Avenue Grounds
- City: New Haven, Connecticut
- Record: 7–40 (.149)
- League place: 8th
- Managers: Charlie Gould, Juice Latham, Charlie Pabor

The New Haven Elm Citys played in their first and only season in 1875 as a member of the National Association of Professional Base Ball Players. They finished eighth in the league with a record of 7–40. The team and league folded at the conclusion of the season.

The club played 26 of their 27 home games at Howard Avenue Grounds. They played one game at the race track known as Hamilton Park.

== Regular season ==
=== Season standings ===
National Association	W	L	T	Pct.	GB
Boston Red Stockings	71	8	3	.884	—
Philadelphia Athletics	53	20	4	.714	15
Hartford Dark Blues	54	28	3	.653	18½
St. Louis Brown Stockings	39	29	2	.571	26½
Philadelphia White Stockings	37	31	2	.543	28½
Chicago White Stockings	30	37	2	.449	35
New York Mutuals	30	38	3	.444	35½
New Haven Elm Citys	7	40	—	.149	48
Washington Nationals	5	23	—	.179	40½
St. Louis Red Stockings	4	15	—	.211	37
Philadelphia Centennials	2	12	—	.143	36½
Brooklyn Atlantics	2	42	—	.045	51½
Keokuk Westerns	1	12	—	.077	37

=== Record vs. opponents ===
1875 National Association Records Sources:
Team	BOS	BR	CHI	HAR	KEO	NH	NY	PHA	PHC	PWS	SLB	SLR	WSH
Boston	—	6–0	8–2	9–1	1–0	5–1	10–0	8–2–2	4–0	6–0–1	7–2	1–0	6–0
Brooklyn	0–6	—	0–2	0–10	0–0	2–1	0–7	0–7	0–0	0–7	0–2	0–0	0–0
Chicago	2–8	2–0	—	4–6–1	4–0	2–1	3–3	1–7–1	0–0	3–7	5–5	4–0	0–0
Hartford	1–9	10–0	6–4–1	—	0–0	8–1	8–2–2	4–3–1	1–0	4–4	5–5	3–0	4–0
Keokuk	0–1	0–0	0–4	0–0	—	0–0	0–1	0–0	0–0	0–0	0–4	1–2	0–0
New Haven	1–5	1–2	1–2	1–8	0–0	—	1–5	0–7	0–1	0–4	1–2	0–0	1–4
New York	0–10	7–0	3–3	2–8–2	1–0	5–1	—	3–6	2–0	5–2	0–8–1	2–0	0–0
Philadelphia Athletics	2–8–2	7–0	7–1–1	3–4–1	0–0	7–0	6–3	—	2–1	8–2	6–1	0–0	5–0
Philadelphia Centennials	0–4	0–0	0–0	0–1	0–0	1–0	0–2	1–2	—	0–3	0–0	0–0	0–0
Philadelphia White Stockings	0–6–1	7–0	7–3	4–4	0–0	4–0	2–5	2–8	3–0	—	5–5–1	1–0	2–0
St. Louis Brown Stockings	2–7	2–0	5–5	5–5	4–0	2–1	8–0–1	1–6	0–0	5–5–1	—	2–0	3–0
St. Louis Red Stockings	0–1	0–0	0–4	0–3	2–1	0–0	0–2	0–0	0–0	0–1	0–2	—	2–1
Washington	0–6	0–0	0–0	0–4	0–0	4–1	0–0	0–5	0–0	0–2	0–3	1–2	—

=== Roster ===
1875 New Haven Elm Citys
Roster
Pitchers: George Knight; Tricky Nichols; Catchers: Studs Bancker; Rit Harrison; Jim Keenan; Tim McGinley	Infielders: Tom Barlow; Booth; John Cassidy; Billy Geer; Fred Goldsmith; Charlie Gould; Juice Latham; Henry Luff; John Smith; Ed Somerville; George Trenwith; Sam Wright	Outfielders: Lester Dole; Evans; John McKelvey; Charlie Pabor; Johnny Ryan; Sullivan; Jim Tipper	Managers: Charlie Gould; Juice Latham; Charlie Pabor

== Player stats ==
=== Batting ===
Note: G = Games played; AB = At bats; H = Hits; Avg. = Batting average; HR = Home runs; RBI = Runs batted in

Player	G	AB	H	Avg.	HR	RBI
Tim McGinley	32	131	36	.275	0	10
Charlie Gould	27	109	29	.266	0	8
Ed Somerville	33	136	29	.213	0	7
Sam Wright	33	127	24	.189	0	5
Harry Luff	38	166	45	.271	2	18
Johnny Ryan	37	146	23	.158	0	8
John McKelvey	43	188	43	.229	0	10
Jim Tipper	41	159	25	.157	0	4
Billy Geer	37	164	40	.244	0	9
Jumbo Latham	20	76	15	.197	0	5
Studs Bancker	19	72	11	.153	0	2
George Trenwith	6	25	6	.240	0	3
Charlie Pabor	6	23	8	.348	0	2
John Cassidy	6	22	3	.136	0	1
Jim Keenan	5	13	1	.077	0	0
Sullivan	2	8	3	.375	0	2
Tom Barlow	1	5	1	.200	0	0
Lester Dole	1	4	2	.500	0	0
John Smith	1	3	0	.000	0	0
Fred Goldsmith	1	4	2	.500	0	1
Rit Harrison	1	4	2	.500	0	1
Evans	1	4	2	.500	0	1
Booth	1	2	0	.000	0	0

=== Starting pitchers ===
Note: G = Games pitched, IP = Innings pitched; W = Wins; L = Losses; ERA = Earned run average; SO = Strikeouts

Player	G	IP	W	L	ERA	SO
Tricky Nichols	34	288.0	4	29	2.38	48
Harry Luff	10	68.2	1	6	3.28	5
Johnny Ryan	10	59.1	1	5	3.19	1
George Knight	1	9.0	1	0	3.00	0
