= 1875 Chicago White Stockings season =

1875 Chicago White Stockings
- League: National Association of Professional Base Ball Players
- Ballpark: 23rd Street Grounds
- City: Chicago
- Record: 30–37–2 (.449)
- League place: 6th
- Owners: George Gage
- Managers: Jimmy Wood

The 1875 Chicago White Stockings season was the fourth season of the Chicago White Stockings franchise, the third and final in the National Association of Professional Base Ball Players and the second at 23rd Street Grounds. The White Stockings finished sixth in the National Association with a record of 30–37–2.

== Regular season ==
=== Season standings ===
National Association	W	L	T	Pct.	GB
Boston Red Stockings	71	8	3	.884	—
Philadelphia Athletics	53	20	4	.714	15
Hartford Dark Blues	54	28	3	.653	18½
St. Louis Brown Stockings	39	29	2	.571	26½
Philadelphia White Stockings	37	31	2	.543	28½
Chicago White Stockings	30	37	2	.449	35
New York Mutuals	30	38	3	.444	35½
New Haven Elm Citys	7	40	—	.149	48
Washington Nationals	5	23	—	.179	40½
St. Louis Red Stockings	4	15	—	.211	37
Philadelphia Centennials	2	12	—	.143	36½
Brooklyn Atlantics	2	42	—	.045	51½
Keokuk Westerns	1	12	—	.077	37

=== Record vs. opponents ===
1875 National Association Records Sources:
Team	BOS	BR	CHI	HAR	KEO	NH	NY	PHA	PHC	PWS	SLB	SLR	WSH
Boston	—	6–0	8–2	9–1	1–0	5–1	10–0	8–2–2	4–0	6–0–1	7–2	1–0	6–0
Brooklyn	0–6	—	0–2	0–10	0–0	2–1	0–7	0–7	0–0	0–7	0–2	0–0	0–0
Chicago	2–8	2–0	—	4–6–1	4–0	2–1	3–3	1–7–1	0–0	3–7	5–5	4–0	0–0
Hartford	1–9	10–0	6–4–1	—	0–0	8–1	8–2–2	4–3–1	1–0	4–4	5–5	3–0	4–0
Keokuk	0–1	0–0	0–4	0–0	—	0–0	0–1	0–0	0–0	0–0	0–4	1–2	0–0
New Haven	1–5	1–2	1–2	1–8	0–0	—	1–5	0–7	0–1	0–4	1–2	0–0	1–4
New York	0–10	7–0	3–3	2–8–2	1–0	5–1	—	3–6	2–0	5–2	0–8–1	2–0	0–0
Philadelphia Athletics	2–8–2	7–0	7–1–1	3–4–1	0–0	7–0	6–3	—	2–1	8–2	6–1	0–0	5–0
Philadelphia Centennials	0–4	0–0	0–0	0–1	0–0	1–0	0–2	1–2	—	0–3	0–0	0–0	0–0
Philadelphia White Stockings	0–6–1	7–0	7–3	4–4	0–0	4–0	2–5	2–8	3–0	—	5–5–1	1–0	2–0
St. Louis Brown Stockings	2–7	2–0	5–5	5–5	4–0	2–1	8–0–1	1–6	0–0	5–5–1	—	2–0	3–0
St. Louis Red Stockings	0–1	0–0	0–4	0–3	2–1	0–0	0–2	0–0	0–0	0–1	0–2	—	2–1
Washington	0–6	0–0	0–0	0–4	0–0	4–1	0–0	0–5	0–0	0–2	0–3	1–2	—

== Roster ==
1875 Chicago White Stockings
Roster
Pitchers: Jim Devlin; Mike Golden; George Zettlein; Catchers: Scott Hastings; Dick Higham; Paddy Quinn	Infielders: Mike Brannock; Will Foley; Paul Hines; George Keerl; Joe Miller; John Peters; Fred Waterman; Warren White	Outfielders: Oscar Bielaski; Spike Brady; John Glenn; Mike Golden	Manager: Jimmy Wood

== Player stats ==
=== Batting ===
Note: G = Games played; AB = At bats; H = Hits; Avg. = Batting average; HR = Home runs; RBI = Runs batted in

Player	G	AB	H	Avg.	HR	RBI
Scott Hastings	65	287	73	.254	0	30
Jim Devlin	69	318	92	.289	0	40
Dick Higham	42	208	49	.236	0	12
John Peters	69	297	85	.286	0	34
Warren White	69	287	71	.247	0	23
John Glenn	69	308	75	.244	0	27
Paul Hines	68	308	101	.328	0	36
Oscar Bielaski	51	201	48	.239	0	11
Mike Golden	39	155	40	.258	0	14
Paddy Quinn	17	61	14	.230	0	1
Joe Miller	15	54	8	.148	0	1
George Keerl	6	23	3	.130	0	3
Fred Waterman	5	20	6	.300	0	3
Will Foley	3	12	3	.250	0	1
Mike Brannock	2	9	1	.111	0	0
Spike Brady	1	4	1	.250	0	0

=== Starting pitchers ===
Note: G = Games pitched; IP = Innings pitched; W = Wins; L = Losses; ERA = Earned run average; SO = Strikeouts

Player	G	IP	W	L	ERA	SO
George Zettlein	31	282.0	17	14	1.28	18
Jim Devlin	28	224.0	7	16	1.93	23
Mike Golden	14	119.0	6	7	1.89	14
