= Studs Bancker =

American baseball player (c. 1853–1888)

- Catcher
- Born: c. 1853; Philadelphia, Pennsylvania, US
- Died: October 7, 1888; Philadelphia, Pennsylvania, US
- Batted: Unknown Threw: Unknown

Major-league debut
- April 19, 1875, for the New Haven Elm Citys

Last major-league appearance
- June 5, 1875, for the New Haven Elm Citys

Major-league statistics
- Batting average: .153
- Home runs: 0
- Runs batted in: 2
- Stats at Baseball Reference

Teams
- New Haven Elm Citys (1875)

John V. "Studs" Bancker (c. 1853 - October 7, 1888) was an American professional baseball player. He played in 19 games in the major leagues, principally as a catcher, for the New Haven Elm Citys between April 19 and June 5, 1875.

== Early years ==
Bancker was born in Philadelphia in about 1853. His father went on to serve in the Civil War.

== Professional baseball ==
Bancker played in 19 games in the major leagues, 14 as catcher and nine at various infield positions, for 1875 New Haven Elm Citys of the National Association. His first major-league game was on April 19, 1875, and his last was on June 5, 1875. He compiled a .153 batting average in 72 at bats.

In addition to his six weeks in the major leagues, Bancker played for the Easton, Pennsylvania, semipro baseball team that won the Pennsylvania state championship in 1874. The Easton club's roster in 1874 also included Jim Devlin, George Bradley, John Abadie, Joe Battin and Bill Hague. He also played for amateur and semipro ball clubs in the Philadelphia area both before and after playing for New Haven.

== Later years ==
After retiring from baseball, he worked as a "segarmaker" and later as a roofer in Philadelphia. He also served multiple sentences in the Philadelphia House of Correction for "drinking-related offenses." He died in Philadelphia in 1888 at approximately age 35. The cause of death was listed as uremia. He was buried at the Old Cathedral Cemetery in Philadelphia.
