= Philadelphia White Stockings all-time roster =

List of baseball players

The Philadelphia White Stockings were a professional baseball franchise that was based in Philadelphia, Pennsylvania. The team existed for three seasons in the National Association from 1873 to 1875. There were known alternatively as the Whites, Phillies, Philadelphias, or Pearls, and played their home games at the Jefferson Street Grounds.

== List of players ==
Players in Bold and have the symbol †, are members of the National Baseball Hall of Fame.

== A ==
- Bob Addy

== B ==
- George Bechtel
- Joe Borden

== C ==
- Bill Craver
- Bill Crowley
- **Candy Cummings**^{†}
- Ned Cuthbert

== D ==
- Jim Devlin
- John Donnelly

== E ==
- Dave Eggler

== F ==
- Cherokee Fisher
- Chick Fulmer

== H ==
- Nat Hicks
- Jim Holdsworth

== M ==
- Denny Mack
- Fergy Malone
- Mike McGeary
- Ed McKenna
- John McMullin
- Levi Meyerle
- Tim Murnane

== P ==
- Charlie Pabor
- Bill Parks

== Q ==
- Quinlan

== R ==
- John Radcliff
- Johnny Ryan

== S ==
- Orator Shafer
- Pop Snyder

== T ==
- Fred Treacey

== W ==
- Sam Weaver
- Jimmy Wood

== Y ==
- Tom York

== Z ==
- George Zettlein
