= 1875 Hartford Dark Blues season =

1875 Hartford Dark Blues
- League: National Association of Professional Base Ball Players
- Ballpark: Hartford Ball Club Grounds
- City: Hartford, Connecticut
- Record: 54–28–3 (.653)
- League place: 3rd
- Owner: Morgan Bulkeley
- Manager: Bob Ferguson

In their second season in the National Association, the 1875 Hartford Dark Blues finished in third place. They were managed by starting third baseman Bob "Death to Flying Things" Ferguson.

The Dark Blues, with future Hall of Famer Candy Cummings, had the best pitching staff in baseball. Cummings won 35 games, and the 19-year-old Tommy Bond finished second in league ERA at 1.56.

Following the season, they were one of the NA teams chosen to join the new National League.

== Regular season ==
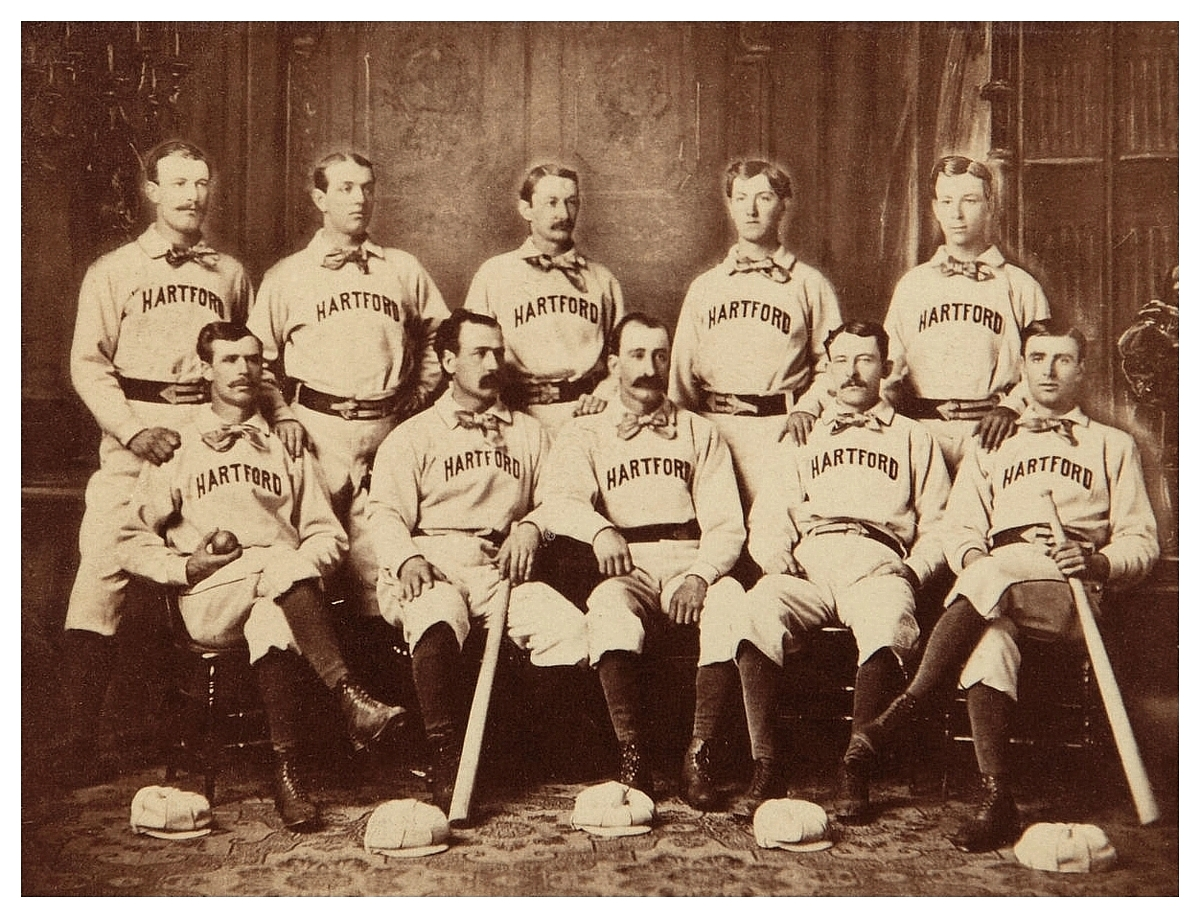
The 1875 Hartford Dark Blues

=== Season standings ===
National Association	W	L	T	Pct.	GB
Boston Red Stockings	71	8	3	.884	—
Philadelphia Athletics	53	20	4	.714	15
Hartford Dark Blues	54	28	3	.653	18½
St. Louis Brown Stockings	39	29	2	.571	26½
Philadelphia White Stockings	37	31	2	.543	28½
Chicago White Stockings	30	37	2	.449	35
New York Mutuals	30	38	3	.444	35½
New Haven Elm Citys	7	40	—	.149	48
Washington Nationals	5	23	—	.179	40½
St. Louis Red Stockings	4	15	—	.211	37
Philadelphia Centennials	2	12	—	.143	36½
Brooklyn Atlantics	2	42	—	.045	51½
Keokuk Westerns	1	12	—	.077	37

=== Record vs. opponents ===
1875 National Association Records Sources:
Team	BOS	BR	CHI	HAR	KEO	NH	NY	PHA	PHC	PWS	SLB	SLR	WSH
Boston	—	6–0	8–2	9–1	1–0	5–1	10–0	8–2–2	4–0	6–0–1	7–2	1–0	6–0
Brooklyn	0–6	—	0–2	0–10	0–0	2–1	0–7	0–7	0–0	0–7	0–2	0–0	0–0
Chicago	2–8	2–0	—	4–6–1	4–0	2–1	3–3	1–7–1	0–0	3–7	5–5	4–0	0–0
Hartford	1–9	10–0	6–4–1	—	0–0	8–1	8–2–2	4–3–1	1–0	4–4	5–5	3–0	4–0
Keokuk	0–1	0–0	0–4	0–0	—	0–0	0–1	0–0	0–0	0–0	0–4	1–2	0–0
New Haven	1–5	1–2	1–2	1–8	0–0	—	1–5	0–7	0–1	0–4	1–2	0–0	1–4
New York	0–10	7–0	3–3	2–8–2	1–0	5–1	—	3–6	2–0	5–2	0–8–1	2–0	0–0
Philadelphia Athletics	2–8–2	7–0	7–1–1	3–4–1	0–0	7–0	6–3	—	2–1	8–2	6–1	0–0	5–0
Philadelphia Centennials	0–4	0–0	0–0	0–1	0–0	1–0	0–2	1–2	—	0–3	0–0	0–0	0–0
Philadelphia White Stockings	0–6–1	7–0	7–3	4–4	0–0	4–0	2–5	2–8	3–0	—	5–5–1	1–0	2–0
St. Louis Brown Stockings	2–7	2–0	5–5	5–5	4–0	2–1	8–0–1	1–6	0–0	5–5–1	—	2–0	3–0
St. Louis Red Stockings	0–1	0–0	0–4	0–3	2–1	0–0	0–2	0–0	0–0	0–1	0–2	—	2–1
Washington	0–6	0–0	0–0	0–4	0–0	4–1	0–0	0–5	0–0	0–2	0–3	1–2	—

=== Roster ===
1875 Hartford Dark Blues
Roster
Pitchers: Tommy Bond; Candy Cummings; Catchers: Doug Allison; Bill Harbridge; Paddy Quinn	Infielders: Jack Burdock; Tom Carey; Bob Ferguson; Everett Mills	Outfielders: Art Allison; Steve Brady; Charley Jones; Jack Remsen; Tom York	Manager: Bob Ferguson

== Player stats ==
=== Batting ===
==== Starters by position ====
Note: Pos = Position; G = Games played; AB = At bats; H = Hits; Avg. = Batting average; HR = Home runs; RBI = Runs batted in

Pos	Player	G	AB	H	Avg.	HR	RBI
C	Doug Allison	61	269	67	.249	0	21
1B	Everett Mills	80	342	89	.260	1	48
2B	Jack Burdock	74	350	103	.294	0	35
3B	Bob Ferguson	85	366	88	.240	0	43
SS	Tom Carey	86	382	101	.264	0	38
OF	Jack Remsen	86	358	96	.268	0	34
OF	Tom York	86	375	111	.296	0	37
OF	Art Allison	40	175	42	.240	1	19

=== Other batters ===
Note: G = Games played; AB = At bats; H = Hits; Avg. = Batting average; HR = Home runs; RBI = Runs batted in

Player	G	AB	H	Avg.	HR	RBI
Bill Harbridge	53	208	50	.240	0	26
Paddy Quinn	5	13	3	.231	0	1
Steve Brady	1	4	0	.000	0	0
Charley Jones	1	4	0	.000	0	0

=== Pitching ===
==== Starting pitchers ====
Note: G = Games pitched; IP = Innings pitched; W = Wins; L = Losses; ERA = Earned run average; SO = Strikeouts

Player	G	IP	W	L	ERA	SO
Candy Cummings	48	417.0	35	12	1.60	8
Tommy Bond	40	352.0	19	16	1.56	8

==== Relief pitchers ====
Note: G = Games pitched; W = Wins; L = Losses; SV = Saves; ERA = Earned run average; SO = Strikeouts

Player	G	W	L	SV	ERA	SO
Bob Ferguson	1	0	0	0	18.00	0

== League leaders ==
Tommy Bond

- #2 in NA in ERA (1.56)

Candy Cummings

- #3 in NA in wins (35)
- #3 in NA in ERA (1.60)
