= 1875 Philadelphia Athletics season =

1875 Philadelphia Athletics
- League: National Association of Professional Base Ball Players
- Ballpark: Jefferson Street Grounds
- City: Philadelphia, Pennsylvania
- Record: 53–20–4 (.714)
- League place: 7th
- Managers: Dick McBride, Cap Anson

The 1875 Athletic Baseball Club of Philadelphia finished in second place in the National Association with a record of 53–20–4. The team played one game in Dover, Delaware, during the season, and otherwise played its home games at Fairview Park Fair Grounds.

The National Association folded after this season, and the Athletics joined the new National League for the 1876 season.

== Regular season ==
=== Season standings ===
National Association	W	L	T	Pct.	GB
Boston Red Stockings	71	8	3	.884	—
Philadelphia Athletics	53	20	4	.714	15
Hartford Dark Blues	54	28	3	.653	18½
St. Louis Brown Stockings	39	29	2	.571	26½
Philadelphia White Stockings	37	31	2	.543	28½
Chicago White Stockings	30	37	2	.449	35
New York Mutuals	30	38	3	.444	35½
New Haven Elm Citys	7	40	—	.149	48
Washington Nationals	5	23	—	.179	40½
St. Louis Red Stockings	4	15	—	.211	37
Philadelphia Centennials	2	12	—	.143	36½
Brooklyn Atlantics	2	42	—	.045	51½
Keokuk Westerns	1	12	—	.077	37

=== Record vs. opponents ===
1875 National Association Records Sources:
Team	BOS	BR	CHI	HAR	KEO	NH	NY	PHA	PHC	PWS	SLB	SLR	WSH
Boston	—	6–0	8–2	9–1	1–0	5–1	10–0	8–2–2	4–0	6–0–1	7–2	1–0	6–0
Brooklyn	0–6	—	0–2	0–10	0–0	2–1	0–7	0–7	0–0	0–7	0–2	0–0	0–0
Chicago	2–8	2–0	—	4–6–1	4–0	2–1	3–3	1–7–1	0–0	3–7	5–5	4–0	0–0
Hartford	1–9	10–0	6–4–1	—	0–0	8–1	8–2–2	4–3–1	1–0	4–4	5–5	3–0	4–0
Keokuk	0–1	0–0	0–4	0–0	—	0–0	0–1	0–0	0–0	0–0	0–4	1–2	0–0
New Haven	1–5	1–2	1–2	1–8	0–0	—	1–5	0–7	0–1	0–4	1–2	0–0	1–4
New York	0–10	7–0	3–3	2–8–2	1–0	5–1	—	3–6	2–0	5–2	0–8–1	2–0	0–0
Philadelphia Athletics	2–8–2	7–0	7–1–1	3–4–1	0–0	7–0	6–3	—	2–1	8–2	6–1	0–0	5–0
Philadelphia Centennials	0–4	0–0	0–0	0–1	0–0	1–0	0–2	1–2	—	0–3	0–0	0–0	0–0
Philadelphia White Stockings	0–6–1	7–0	7–3	4–4	0–0	4–0	2–5	2–8	3–0	—	5–5–1	1–0	2–0
St. Louis Brown Stockings	2–7	2–0	5–5	5–5	4–0	2–1	8–0–1	1–6	0–0	5–5–1	—	2–0	3–0
St. Louis Red Stockings	0–1	0–0	0–4	0–3	2–1	0–0	0–2	0–0	0–0	0–1	0–2	—	2–1
Washington	0–6	0–0	0–0	0–4	0–0	4–1	0–0	0–5	0–0	0–2	0–3	1–2	—

=== Roster ===
1875 Philadelphia Athletics
Roster
Pitchers: Lon Knight; Dick McBride; Catchers: John Clapp; William Coon	Infielders: Cap Anson; Bill Craver; Wes Fisler; Davy Force; John Richmond; Ezra Sutton	Outfielders: George Bechtel; Dave Eggler; Henry Gilroy; George Hall; Al Reach; Adam Rocap	Manager: Cap Anson; Dick McBride

== Player stats ==
=== Batting ===
==== Starters by position ====
Note: Pos = Position; G = Games played; AB = At bats; H = Hits; Avg. = Batting average; HR = Home runs; RBI = Runs batted in

Pos	Player	G	AB	H	Avg.	HR	RBI
C	John Clapp	60	292	77	.264	0	39
1B	Wes Fisler	58	268	74	.276	0	31
2B	Bill Craver	54	260	83	.319	2	40
SS	Davy Force	77	386	120	.311	0	49
3B	Ezra Sutton	75	358	116	.324	1	59
OF	Dave Eggler	66	295	89	.302	0	33
OF	George Hall	77	358	107	.299	4	62
OF	George Bechtel	35	164	46	.280	0	20

==== Other batters ====
Note: G = Games played; AB = At bats; H = Hits; Avg. = Batting average; HR = Home runs; RBI = Runs batted in

Player	G	AB	H	Avg.	HR	RBI
Cap Anson	69	326	106	.325	0	58
John Richmond	29	125	25	.200	0	12
Adam Rocap	16	69	12	.174	0	4
Al Reach	3	14	4	.286	0	1
William Coon	4	12	2	.167	0	1
Henry Gilroy	2	6	1	.167	0	0

=== Pitching ===
==== Starting pitchers ====
Note: G = Games pitched; IP = Innings pitched; W = Wins; L = Losses; ERA = Earned run average; SO = Strikeouts

Player	G	IP	W	L	ERA	SO
Dick McBride	60	538.0	44	14	2.33	27
Lon Knight	13	107.0	6	5	2.27	15
George Bechtel	4	36.0	1	0	2.50	3

==== Relief pitchers ====
Note: G = Games pitched; IP = Innings pitched; W = Wins; L = Losses; ERA = Earned run average; SO = Strikeouts

Player	G	IP	W	L	ERA	SO
Ezra Sutton	2	6.0	0	0	10.50	0
