= 1875 New York Mutuals season =

1875 New York Mutuals
- League: National Association of Professional Base Ball Players
- Ballpark: Union Grounds
- City: New York, New York
- Record: 30–38–3 (.444)
- League place: 6th
- Owner: Bill Cammeyer
- Managers: Tom Carey, Dick Higham

The New York Mutuals baseball team finished sixth in the National Association in 1875. The league folded after this season and the Mutuals joined the new National League in 1876.

== Regular season ==
=== Season standings ===
National Association	W	L	T	Pct.	GB
Boston Red Stockings	71	8	3	.884	—
Philadelphia Athletics	53	20	4	.714	15
Hartford Dark Blues	54	28	3	.653	18½
St. Louis Brown Stockings	39	29	2	.571	26½
Philadelphia White Stockings	37	31	2	.543	28½
Chicago White Stockings	30	37	2	.449	35
New York Mutuals	30	38	3	.444	35½
New Haven Elm Citys	7	40	—	.149	48
Washington Nationals	5	23	—	.179	40½
St. Louis Red Stockings	4	15	—	.211	37
Philadelphia Centennials	2	12	—	.143	36½
Brooklyn Atlantics	2	42	—	.045	51½
Keokuk Westerns	1	12	—	.077	37

=== Record vs. opponents ===
1875 National Association Records Sources:
Team	BOS	BR	CHI	HAR	KEO	NH	NY	PHA	PHC	PWS	SLB	SLR	WSH
Boston	—	6–0	8–2	9–1	1–0	5–1	10–0	8–2–2	4–0	6–0–1	7–2	1–0	6–0
Brooklyn	0–6	—	0–2	0–10	0–0	2–1	0–7	0–7	0–0	0–7	0–2	0–0	0–0
Chicago	2–8	2–0	—	4–6–1	4–0	2–1	3–3	1–7–1	0–0	3–7	5–5	4–0	0–0
Hartford	1–9	10–0	6–4–1	—	0–0	8–1	8–2–2	4–3–1	1–0	4–4	5–5	3–0	4–0
Keokuk	0–1	0–0	0–4	0–0	—	0–0	0–1	0–0	0–0	0–0	0–4	1–2	0–0
New Haven	1–5	1–2	1–2	1–8	0–0	—	1–5	0–7	0–1	0–4	1–2	0–0	1–4
New York	0–10	7–0	3–3	2–8–2	1–0	5–1	—	3–6	2–0	5–2	0–8–1	2–0	0–0
Philadelphia Athletics	2–8–2	7–0	7–1–1	3–4–1	0–0	7–0	6–3	—	2–1	8–2	6–1	0–0	5–0
Philadelphia Centennials	0–4	0–0	0–0	0–1	0–0	1–0	0–2	1–2	—	0–3	0–0	0–0	0–0
Philadelphia White Stockings	0–6–1	7–0	7–3	4–4	0–0	4–0	2–5	2–8	3–0	—	5–5–1	1–0	2–0
St. Louis Brown Stockings	2–7	2–0	5–5	5–5	4–0	2–1	8–0–1	1–6	0–0	5–5–1	—	2–0	3–0
St. Louis Red Stockings	0–1	0–0	0–4	0–3	2–1	0–0	0–2	0–0	0–0	0–1	0–2	—	2–1
Washington	0–6	0–0	0–0	0–4	0–0	4–1	0–0	0–5	0–0	0–2	0–3	1–2	—

=== Roster ===
1875 New York Mutuals
Roster
Pitchers: Bobby Mathews; Catchers: Nat Hicks; Dick Higham	Infielders: Billy Barnie; Joe Gerhardt; Jimmy Hallinan; Alfred Metcalfe; Candy Nelson; Joe Start	Outfielders: Eddie Booth; Count Gedney; John Hatfield; Jim Holdsworth; Pat McGee; Nealy Phelps	Manager: Nat Hicks

== Player stats ==
=== Batting ===
Note: G = Games played; AB = At bats; H = Hits; Avg. = Batting average; HR = Home runs; RBI = Runs batted in

Player	G	AB	H	Avg.	HR	RBI
Nat Hicks	62	269	67	.249	0	22
Joe Start	69	314	90	.287	4	30
Candy Nelson	70	276	55	.199	0	23
Jimmy Hallinan	44	203	58	.286	3	21
Joe Gerhardt	58	252	54	.214	0	20
Eddie Booth	68	281	56	.199	0	18
Count Gedney	68	267	55	.206	0	17
Jim Holdsworth	71	324	92	.284	0	23
Pat McGee	25	95	17	.179	0	9
Dick Higham	15	64	25	.391	0	10
Billy Barnie	9	34	5	.147	0	1
Alfred Metcalfe	8	32	7	.219	0	1
Nealy Phelps	2	6	2	.333	0	0
John Hatfield	1	4	2	.500	0	1

=== Starting pitchers ===
Note: G = Games pitched; IP = Innings pitched; W = Wins; L = Losses; ERA = Earned run average; SO = Strikeouts

Player	G	IP	W	L	ERA	SO
Bobby Mathews	70	625.2	29	38	2.49	75

==== Relief pitchers ====
Note: G = Games pitched; W = Wins; L = Losses; SV = Saves; ERA = Earned run average; SO = Strikeouts

Player	G	W	L	SV	ERA	SO
Count Gedney	2	1	0	0	0.82	2
