= 1875 St. Louis Brown Stockings season =

1875 St. Louis Brown Stockings
- League: National Association of Professional Base Ball Players
- Ballpark: Grand Avenue Ball Grounds
- City: St. Louis, Missouri
- Record: 39–29–2 (.571)
- League place: 4th
- Owners: James Lucas, C. Orrick Bishop
- Manager: Dickey Pearce

In the fall of 1874, a group of civic boosters in St. Louis raised $20,000 to organize the creation of the cities first professional ball club. The St. Louis Brown Stockings joined the National Association of Professional Base Ball Players for the 1875 season and finished the season in fourth place. They subsequently joined the new National League for the 1876 season. The Brown Stockings joined the National League as a founding team and thus inspired what is now a rich baseball history in the city of St. Louis.

== Preseason acquisitions ==
C. Orrick Bishop, a local St. Louis lawyer, was named as the Brown Stockings Vice President and given the task of going east to recruit top talent. In Brooklyn, Bishop picked up Dickey Pearce, Jack Chapman, Herman Dehlman, and Lip Pike. In and around Philadelphia, Bishop added Ned Cuthbert, Reddy Miller, George Bradley, Bill Hague, and Joe Battin.

=== Management ===
Dickey Pearce having been signed from the 1874 Brooklyn Atlantics became the first ever manager of the St. Louis Brown Stockings. Dickey Pearce is most known for his cunning managerial mind and creating the position of shortstop which he manned for the Brown Stockings in 1875.

=== Hitters ===
The St. Louis Brown Stockings worst hitter—starting catcher Tom Miller—had an OPS+ of 24 over 56 games. He hit .164—33 singles, two doubles, and one walk in 214 at-bats. The St. Louis Brown Stockings best hitter, Lip Pike, hit .346/.352/.494, for an OPS+ of 203—74 singles, 22 doubles, 12 triples. Lip Pike was known as the leagues most athletic hitter and for good reason as he is rumored to have raced a trotting horse and won.

=== Pitchers ===
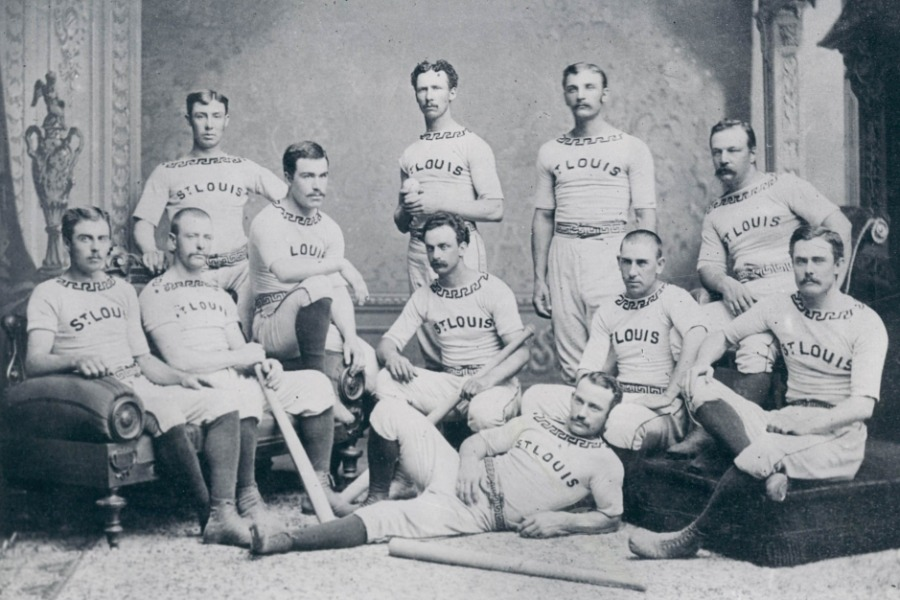
Top row from left to right: Joe Blong, right field and change pitcher; George Bradley, pitcher; John Clapp, catcher; Dickey Pearce, short fielder. Bottom row from left to right: Joe Battin, third base; George Seward, substitute and change catcher; John Chapman, right field; Lip Pike, right; Edgar Cuthbert, center; Michael McGeary, second base; Denny Mack, short fielder and general utility man.

Eighteen-year-old Pud Galvin is credited with leading the league in ERA (1.16) while just only pitching 62 innings.

== Regular season ==
=== Season standings ===
National Association	W	L	T	Pct.	GB
Boston Red Stockings	71	8	3	.884	—
Philadelphia Athletics	53	20	4	.714	15
Hartford Dark Blues	54	28	3	.653	18½
St. Louis Brown Stockings	39	29	2	.571	26½
Philadelphia White Stockings	37	31	2	.543	28½
Chicago White Stockings	30	37	2	.449	35
New York Mutuals	30	38	3	.444	35½
New Haven Elm Citys	7	40	—	.149	48
Washington Nationals	5	23	—	.179	40½
St. Louis Red Stockings	4	15	—	.211	37
Philadelphia Centennials	2	12	—	.143	36½
Brooklyn Atlantics	2	42	—	.045	51½
Keokuk Westerns	1	12	—	.077	37

=== Record vs. opponents ===
1875 National Association Records Sources:
Team	BOS	BR	CHI	HAR	KEO	NH	NY	PHA	PHC	PWS	SLB	SLR	WSH
Boston	—	6–0	8–2	9–1	1–0	5–1	10–0	8–2–2	4–0	6–0–1	7–2	1–0	6–0
Brooklyn	0–6	—	0–2	0–10	0–0	2–1	0–7	0–7	0–0	0–7	0–2	0–0	0–0
Chicago	2–8	2–0	—	4–6–1	4–0	2–1	3–3	1–7–1	0–0	3–7	5–5	4–0	0–0
Hartford	1–9	10–0	6–4–1	—	0–0	8–1	8–2–2	4–3–1	1–0	4–4	5–5	3–0	4–0
Keokuk	0–1	0–0	0–4	0–0	—	0–0	0–1	0–0	0–0	0–0	0–4	1–2	0–0
New Haven	1–5	1–2	1–2	1–8	0–0	—	1–5	0–7	0–1	0–4	1–2	0–0	1–4
New York	0–10	7–0	3–3	2–8–2	1–0	5–1	—	3–6	2–0	5–2	0–8–1	2–0	0–0
Philadelphia Athletics	2–8–2	7–0	7–1–1	3–4–1	0–0	7–0	6–3	—	2–1	8–2	6–1	0–0	5–0
Philadelphia Centennials	0–4	0–0	0–0	0–1	0–0	1–0	0–2	1–2	—	0–3	0–0	0–0	0–0
Philadelphia White Stockings	0–6–1	7–0	7–3	4–4	0–0	4–0	2–5	2–8	3–0	—	5–5–1	1–0	2–0
St. Louis Brown Stockings	2–7	2–0	5–5	5–5	4–0	2–1	8–0–1	1–6	0–0	5–5–1	—	2–0	3–0
St. Louis Red Stockings	0–1	0–0	0–4	0–3	2–1	0–0	0–2	0–0	0–0	0–1	0–2	—	2–1
Washington	0–6	0–0	0–0	0–4	0–0	4–1	0–0	0–5	0–0	0–2	0–3	1–2	—

=== Roster ===
1875 St. Louis Brown Stockings roster
Roster
Pitchers: George Bradley; Frank Fleet; Pud Galvin; Catchers: Tom Miller; George Seward	Infielders: Joe Battin; Herman Dehlman; Bill Hague; Dickey Pearce	Outfielders: Jack Chapman; Ned Cuthbert; Lip Pike; Charlie Waitt	Manager: Dickey Pearce

== Player stats ==
=== Batting ===
Note: G = Games played; AB = At bats; H = Hits; Avg. = Batting average; HR = Home runs; RBI = Runs batted in

Player	G	AB	H	Avg.	HR	RBI
Tom Miller	56	214	35	.164	0	12
Herman Dehlman	67	254	57	.224	0	14
Joe Battin	67	284	71	.250	0	33
Dickey Pearce	70	311	77	.248	0	29
Bill Hague	62	260	57	.219	0	22
Lip Pike	70	312	108	.346	0	44
Jack Chapman	43	195	44	.226	0	30
Ned Cuthbert	68	319	78	.245	0	17
Charlie Waitt	30	113	23	.204	0	12
George Seward	25	96	24	.250	0	8
Frank Fleet	4	16	1	.063	0	1

=== Starting pitchers ===
Note: G = Games pitched; IP = Innings pitched; W = Wins; L = Losses; ERA = Earned run average; SO = Strikeouts

Player	G	IP	W	L	ERA	SO
George Bradley	60	535.2	33	26	2.13	60
Pud Galvin	8	62.0	4	2	1.16	8
Frank Fleet	3	27.0	2	1	3.33	3

=== Relief pitchers ===
Note: G = Games pitched; W = Wins; L = Losses; SV = Saves; ERA = Earned run average; SO = Strikeouts

Player	G	W	L	SV	ERA	SO
Dickey Pearce	2	0	0	0	3.38	0
