= 1875 Boston Red Stockings season =

1875 Boston Red Stockings
- National Association Champions
- League: National Association of Professional Base Ball Players
- Ballpark: South End Grounds
- City: Boston, Massachusetts
- Record: 71–8 (.899)
- League place: 1st
- Owner: Nicholas T. Apollonio
- Manager: Harry Wright (5th Season)

The 1875 Boston Red Stockings season was the fifth season of the Boston Red Stockings franchise. They won their fourth consecutive National Association championship.

Managed by Harry Wright, Boston finished with a record of 71–8 to win the pennant by 15 games. Pitcher Al Spalding started 62 of the Red Stockings' games and led the NA with 54 wins. Catcher Deacon White (.367), second baseman Ross Barnes (.364), and first baseman Cal McVey (.355) finished 1–2–3 in the league's batting race. McVey paced the circuit with 87 runs batted in, and outfielder Jim O'Rourke had the most home runs, with 6. The Boston offense scored more runs than any other team in the NA. According to the FiveThirtyEight ELO rating system, they are the greatest team of all time.

Harry Wright, Al Spalding, Jim O'Rourke, and shortstop George Wright have all been elected into the Baseball Hall of Fame.

This was the last season of the Association, which dissolved at the end of the year. The Red Stockings club would join the new National League in 1876.

== Regular season ==
=== Season standings ===
National Association	W	L	T	Pct.	GB
Boston Red Stockings	71	8	3	.884	—
Philadelphia Athletics	53	20	4	.714	15
Hartford Dark Blues	54	28	3	.653	18½
St. Louis Brown Stockings	39	29	2	.571	26½
Philadelphia White Stockings	37	31	2	.543	28½
Chicago White Stockings	30	37	2	.449	35
New York Mutuals	30	38	3	.444	35½
New Haven Elm Citys	7	40	—	.149	48
Washington Nationals	5	23	—	.179	40½
St. Louis Red Stockings	4	15	—	.211	37
Philadelphia Centennials	2	12	—	.143	36½
Brooklyn Atlantics	2	42	—	.045	51½
Keokuk Westerns	1	12	—	.077	37

=== Record vs. opponents ===
1875 National Association Records Sources:
Team	BOS	BR	CHI	HAR	KEO	NH	NY	PHA	PHC	PWS	SLB	SLR	WSH
Boston	—	6–0	8–2	9–1	1–0	5–1	10–0	8–2–2	4–0	6–0–1	7–2	1–0	6–0
Brooklyn	0–6	—	0–2	0–10	0–0	2–1	0–7	0–7	0–0	0–7	0–2	0–0	0–0
Chicago	2–8	2–0	—	4–6–1	4–0	2–1	3–3	1–7–1	0–0	3–7	5–5	4–0	0–0
Hartford	1–9	10–0	6–4–1	—	0–0	8–1	8–2–2	4–3–1	1–0	4–4	5–5	3–0	4–0
Keokuk	0–1	0–0	0–4	0–0	—	0–0	0–1	0–0	0–0	0–0	0–4	1–2	0–0
New Haven	1–5	1–2	1–2	1–8	0–0	—	1–5	0–7	0–1	0–4	1–2	0–0	1–4
New York	0–10	7–0	3–3	2–8–2	1–0	5–1	—	3–6	2–0	5–2	0–8–1	2–0	0–0
Philadelphia Athletics	2–8–2	7–0	7–1–1	3–4–1	0–0	7–0	6–3	—	2–1	8–2	6–1	0–0	5–0
Philadelphia Centennials	0–4	0–0	0–0	0–1	0–0	1–0	0–2	1–2	—	0–3	0–0	0–0	0–0
Philadelphia White Stockings	0–6–1	7–0	7–3	4–4	0–0	4–0	2–5	2–8	3–0	—	5–5–1	1–0	2–0
St. Louis Brown Stockings	2–7	2–0	5–5	5–5	4–0	2–1	8–0–1	1–6	0–0	5–5–1	—	2–0	3–0
St. Louis Red Stockings	0–1	0–0	0–4	0–3	2–1	0–0	0–2	0–0	0–0	0–1	0–2	—	2–1
Washington	0–6	0–0	0–0	0–4	0–0	4–1	0–0	0–5	0–0	0–2	0–3	1–2	—

=== Roster ===
1875 Boston Red Stockings
Roster
Pitchers: Jack Manning; Albert Spalding; Catchers: Deacon White	Infielders: Ross Barnes; Frank Heifer; Juice Latham; Cal McVey; Harry Schafer; George Wright	Outfielders: Tommy Beals; Andy Leonard; Jack Manning; Jim O'Rourke; Harry Wright	Manager: Harry Wright

== Player stats ==
=== Batting ===
==== Starters by position ====
Note: Pos = Position; G = Games played; AB = At bats; H = Hits; Avg. = Batting average; HR = Home runs; RBI = Runs batted in

Pos	Player	G	AB	H	Avg.	HR	RBI
C	Deacon White	80	371	136	.367	1	60
1B	Cal McVey	82	389	138	.355	3	87
2B	Ross Barnes	78	393	143	.364	1	58
SS	George Wright	79	408	136	.333	2	61
3B	Harry Schafer	52	222	64	.288	0	17
OF	Jack Manning	77	348	94	.270	1	46
OF	Jim O'Rourke	75	358	106	.296	6	72
OF	Andy Leonard	80	396	127	.321	1	74

==== Other batters ====
Note: G = Games played; AB = At bats; H = Hits; Avg. = Batting average; HR = Home runs; RBI = Runs batted in

Player	G	AB	H	Avg.	HR	RBI
Tommy Beals	35	155	41	.265	0	16
Juice Latham	16	78	21	.269	0	13
Frank Heifer	11	50	14	.280	0	5
Harry Wright	1	4	1	.250	0	0

=== Pitching ===
==== Starting pitchers ====
Note: G = Games pitched; IP = Innings pitched; W = Wins; L = Losses; ERA = Earned run average; SO = Strikeouts

Player	G	IP	W	L	ERA	SO
Al Spalding	72	570.2	54	5	1.59	75
Jack Manning	27	144.0	16	2	2.38	34

==== Relief pitchers ====
Note: G = Games pitched; IP = Innings pitched; W = Wins; L = Losses; ERA = Earned run average; SO = Strikeouts

Player	G	IP	W	L	ERA	SO
Cal McVey	3	11.0	1	0	4.91	1
George Wright	2	4.0	0	1	6.75	0
Frank Heifer	2	2.1	0	0	15.43	0

Preceded by Boston Red Stockings; 1874	National Association of Professional Base Ball Players Championship Season; 1875	Succeeded by League Disbands
