= 1875 Philadelphia White Stockings season =

1875 Philadelphia White Stockings
- League: National Association of Professional Base Ball Players
- Ballpark: Jefferson Street Grounds
- City: Philadelphia, Pennsylvania
- Record: 37–31–2 (.543)
- League place: 5th
- Managers: Mike McGeary, Bob Addy

The Philadelphia White Stockings played in 1875 as a member of the National Association of Professional Base Ball Players. The press of that time generally referred to them as the Philadelphia Whites, or the Philadelphia Club.

The team finished fifth in the league in 1875, with a record of 37–31–2. Among their players that season was Tim Murnane, spelled "Murnan" by many newspapers (for example, "...yesterday the Whites won the toss and placed their men in position, with the Philadelphias represented by Murnan at the bat." ("Sporting News," Chicago Inter Ocean, June 23, 1875, p. 5).

The team and league folded at the conclusion of the season.

== Regular season ==
=== Season standings ===
National Association	W	L	T	Pct.	GB
Boston Red Stockings	71	8	3	.884	—
Philadelphia Athletics	53	20	4	.714	15
Hartford Dark Blues	54	28	3	.653	18½
St. Louis Brown Stockings	39	29	2	.571	26½
Philadelphia White Stockings	37	31	2	.543	28½
Chicago White Stockings	30	37	2	.449	35
New York Mutuals	30	38	3	.444	35½
New Haven Elm Citys	7	40	—	.149	48
Washington Nationals	5	23	—	.179	40½
St. Louis Red Stockings	4	15	—	.211	37
Philadelphia Centennials	2	12	—	.143	36½
Brooklyn Atlantics	2	42	—	.045	51½
Keokuk Westerns	1	12	—	.077	37

=== Record vs. opponents ===
1875 National Association Records Sources:
Team	BOS	BR	CHI	HAR	KEO	NH	NY	PHA	PHC	PWS	SLB	SLR	WSH
Boston	—	6–0	8–2	9–1	1–0	5–1	10–0	8–2–2	4–0	6–0–1	7–2	1–0	6–0
Brooklyn	0–6	—	0–2	0–10	0–0	2–1	0–7	0–7	0–0	0–7	0–2	0–0	0–0
Chicago	2–8	2–0	—	4–6–1	4–0	2–1	3–3	1–7–1	0–0	3–7	5–5	4–0	0–0
Hartford	1–9	10–0	6–4–1	—	0–0	8–1	8–2–2	4–3–1	1–0	4–4	5–5	3–0	4–0
Keokuk	0–1	0–0	0–4	0–0	—	0–0	0–1	0–0	0–0	0–0	0–4	1–2	0–0
New Haven	1–5	1–2	1–2	1–8	0–0	—	1–5	0–7	0–1	0–4	1–2	0–0	1–4
New York	0–10	7–0	3–3	2–8–2	1–0	5–1	—	3–6	2–0	5–2	0–8–1	2–0	0–0
Philadelphia Athletics	2–8–2	7–0	7–1–1	3–4–1	0–0	7–0	6–3	—	2–1	8–2	6–1	0–0	5–0
Philadelphia Centennials	0–4	0–0	0–0	0–1	0–0	1–0	0–2	1–2	—	0–3	0–0	0–0	0–0
Philadelphia White Stockings	0–6–1	7–0	7–3	4–4	0–0	4–0	2–5	2–8	3–0	—	5–5–1	1–0	2–0
St. Louis Brown Stockings	2–7	2–0	5–5	5–5	4–0	2–1	8–0–1	1–6	0–0	5–5–1	—	2–0	3–0
St. Louis Red Stockings	0–1	0–0	0–4	0–3	2–1	0–0	0–2	0–0	0–0	0–1	0–2	—	2–1
Washington	0–6	0–0	0–0	0–4	0–0	4–1	0–0	0–5	0–0	0–2	0–3	1–2	—

=== Roster ===
1875 Philadelphia Whites
Roster
Pitchers: Joe Borden; Cherokee Fisher; Sam Weaver; George Zettlein; Catchers: Pop Snyder	Infielders: Bill Crowley; Chick Fulmer; Fergy Malone; Mike McGeary; Levi Meyerle; Tim Murnane	Outfielders: Bob Addy; John McMullin; Bill Parks; Orator Shafer; Fred Treacey	Managers: Bob Addy; Mike McGeary

== Player stats ==
=== Batting ===
Note: G = Games played; AB = At bats; H = Hits; Avg. = Batting average; HR = Home runs; RBI = Runs batted in

Player	G	AB	H	Avg.	HR	RBI
Pop Snyder	66	263	64	.243	1	25
Tim Murnane	69	313	85	.272	1	30
Levi Meyerle	68	301	95	.316	1	54
Chick Fulmer	69	295	65	.220	0	24
Mike McGeary	68	310	90	.290	0	37
Fred Treacey	43	179	38	.212	0	15
Bob Addy	69	310	80	.258	0	43
John McMullin	54	222	57	.257	2	19
Fergy Malone	29	123	28	.228	0	10
Orator Shafer	19	70	17	.243	0	6
Bill Crowley	9	37	3	.081	0	3
Bill Parks	2	6	1	.167	0	0

=== Starting pitchers ===
Note: G = Games pitched; IP = Innings pitched; W = Wins; L = Losses; ERA = Earned run average; SO = Strikeouts

Player	G	IP	W	L	ERA	SO
Cherokee Fisher	41	358.0	22	19	1.99	18
George Zettlein	21	181.1	12	8	2.08	13
Joe Borden	7	66.0	2	4	1.50	9
Sam Weaver	1	6.0	1	0	1.50	2

==== Relief pitchers ====
Note: G = Games pitched; W = Wins; L = Losses; SV = Saves; ERA = Earned run average; SO = Strikeouts

Player	G	W	L	SV	ERA	SO
John McMullin	4	0	0	0	7.94	0
Bill Parks	2	0	0	0	8.44	0
