= Charles Witherow =

American baseball player (1852–1948)

- Pitcher
- Born: April 1852; Washington, D.C., U.S.
- Died: July 3, 1948 (aged 96); Washington, D.C., U.S.
- Batted: unknown Threw: Right

MLB debut
- July 1, 1875, for the Washington Nationals

Last MLB appearance
- July 1, 1875, for the Washington Nationals

MLB statistics
- Win–loss record: 0-1
- Earned run average: 18.00
- Strikeouts: 0
- Stats at Baseball Reference

Teams
- Washington Nationals (1875)

Charles Lafayette Witherow (April 1852 – July 3, 1948) was an American professional baseball pitcher. He appeared in one game for the 1875 Washington Nationals of the National Association. He was the starting pitcher for the Nationals on July 1, but only lasted one inning as he gave up four hits and five runs, two runs which were earned. At the time of his death, Charles Witherow was the last surviving participant of the National Association. At the time of his death he had been the last living player from the 1875 season.

Records
| Preceded by John McKelvey | Oldest recognized verified living baseball player May 31, 1944 – July 3, 1948 | Succeeded by Henry Jones |
