= Mike Brannock =

American baseball player (1851–1881)

- Third baseman
- Born: October 25, 1851; Douglas, Massachusetts, U.S.
- Died: October 7, 1881 (aged 29); Chicago, Illinois, U.S.
- Batted: Unknown Threw: Unknown

MLB debut
- October 21, 1871, for the Chicago White Stockings

Last MLB appearance
- August 28, 1875, for the Chicago White Stockings

MLB statistics
- Games played: 5
- Hits: 2
- Batting average: .087
- Stats at Baseball Reference

Teams
- Chicago White Stockings (1871); Chicago White Stockings (1875)

Michael J. Brannock (October 25, 1851 – October 7, 1881) was an American third baseman in the National Association for the Chicago White Stockings in 1871, and later played for another incarnation of the Chicago White Stockings in 1875, predecessors of the today's Chicago Cubs.

Brannock debuted with the White Stockings on October 21, 1871, at age 19. He was one of only eight teenagers to appear in a National Association game that season. Brannock played three games before the season was out. He managed just one hit in 14 at-bats, scoring just two runs. Brannock didn't play in the league again until 1875, when he went 1 for 9 with two runs scored and two stolen bases. His final game was August 25, 1875. For his career, Brannock had just two hits in 23 at-bats for a batting average of .087. Brannock also had 8 errors in just 16 chances in the field for a rather low fielding average of .500.

Brannock died at the age of 29 in Chicago, and is interred at the Calvary Cemetery in Evanston, Illinois.
