= John Lawrie (baseball) =

American baseball player

- Outfielder
- Born: 1849; Washington, D.C.
- Died: January 20, 1879 (aged 29–30); Washington, D.C.
- Batted: Unknown Threw: Unknown

MLB debut
- June 26, 1875, for the Washington Nationals

Last MLB appearance
- July 4, 1875, for the Washington Nationals

MLB statistics
- At bats: 22
- Runs batted in: 0
- Batting average: .136
- Stats at Baseball Reference

Teams
- Washington Nationals (1875)

John W. Lawrie or John D. Lowry (1849 – January 20, 1879) was an American professional baseball player who played for the Washington Nationals in 1875. He appeared in six games for the Nationals and hit .136.
