= Rit Harrison =

American baseball player (1849–1888)

- Catcher / Shortstop
- Born: September 16, 1849; Haverstraw, New York, U.S.
- Died: November 7, 1888 (aged 39); Bridgeport, Connecticut, U.S.
- Batted: Unknown Threw: Unknown

MLB debut
- May 20, 1875, for the New Haven Elm Citys

Last MLB appearance
- May 20, 1875, for the New Haven Elm Citys

MLB statistics
- Batting average: .500
- Home runs: 0
- Runs batted in: 1
- Stats at Baseball Reference

Teams
- New Haven Elm Citys (1875)

Washington Ritter "Rit" Harrison (September 18, 1849 – November 7, 1888) was an American professional baseball player who participated in one game as a catcher and shortstop for the New Haven Elm Citys in 1875. Requiring a substitute for their May 20 game against the Philadelphia Athletics, the Elm Citys turned to Harrison, a "local amateur". He began the game at catcher, where he made two errors and gave up two passed balls, and was moved to shortstop, where he made another error. However, Harrison did well batting; he had two hits (one a double) in four at-bats, and recorded a run batted in.

== Personal life and death ==
In 1870, Harrison was listed in the census as a painter's apprentice. He married Annabella Shelton in 1877, and they had two children — Theodore and Sarah — and moved to her hometown of Waterbury, Connecticut, where he became employed as a painter, a painter's apprentice and thereafter a brass turner and a foreman, according to the 1870 and 1880 censuses. Harrison died in Bridgeport, Connecticut in 1888, and was buried in Riverside Cemetery in Waterbury.
