= John Abadie =

American baseball player (1854–1905)

John William Abadie
- First baseman
- Born: November 4, 1854; Philadelphia, Pennsylvania, U.S.
- Died: May 17, 1905 (aged 50); Pemberton, New Jersey, U.S.
- Batted: Right Threw: Right

MLB debut
- April 26, 1875, for the Philadelphia Centennials

Last MLB appearance
- June 10, 1875, for the Brooklyn Atlantics

MLB statistics
- Batting average: .224
- Runs scored: 4
- Runs batted in: 5
- Stats at Baseball Reference

Teams
- Philadelphia Centennials (1875); Brooklyn Atlantics (1875)

John W. Abadie (November 4, 1854 – May 17, 1905) was an American professional baseball first baseman who played in the National Association during the 1875 season. He was born in Philadelphia, Pennsylvania.

== Biography ==
Previously to playing in the majors, Abadie saw action at first base for a semi-professional team in Easton, Pennsylvania, which was the hardest team to beat in exhibition games. As a result, this team defeated the Philadelphia Athletics, Philadelphia Whites and Brooklyn Atlantics charter teams of the National Association in 1874. Then, when the National Association expanded in 1875, Abadie and seven of his teammates were drafted because of the Easton team's success.

Abadie played 12 games with the Philadelphia Centennials and Brooklyn Atlantics during the 1875 season, compiling a batting average of .224 (11 for 49) with four runs scored and five RBI. Additionally, John Abadie became the only player to have a unique triple slash line (.224/.224/.224) in a Major League career.

After the 1875 season, the National Association lost five of its teams and was forced to fold. Abadie returned to playing for independent teams in the Minor Leagues and never appeared in a major league game again.

== Death ==
Abadie died at the age of fifty on May 17, 1905, in Pemberton, New Jersey.
