= Holly Hollingshead =

American baseball player and manager (1853–1926)

- Center fielder / Second baseman / Manager
- Born: January 17, 1853; Washington, D.C., U.S.
- Died: October 6, 1926 (aged 73); Washington, D.C., U.S.
- Batted: Unknown Threw: Unknown

Major-league debut
- April 20, 1872, for the Washington Nationals

Last major-league appearance
- June 9, 1875, for the Washington Nationals

Major-league statistics
- Batting average: .264
- Runs: 45
- Runs batted in: 33
- Stats at Baseball Reference

Teams
- National Association of Base Ball Players Washington Nationals (1869–1870) Washington Olympics (1870) League player Washington Nationals (1872) Washington Blue Legs (1873) Washington Nationals (1875) League manager Washington Nationals (1875) Washington Nationals (1884)

John Samuel "Holly" Hollingshead (January 17, 1853 – October 6, 1926) was an American amateur and professional baseball player who was a center fielder, second baseman, and manager in the 19th century.

== Life ==
Hollingshead played for the Washington Nationals of the National Association in 1872 and 1875, and also for the Washington Blue Legs in 1873. In 58 total games played he batted .264 with 33 runs batted in and 45 runs scored.

He was also a manager for the Nationals for part of the 1875 season, guiding them to a record of 4-16. Outfielder/pitcher Bill Parks took over the managerial duties for the last eight games and the team went 1-7. Hollingshead also managed the Washington Nationals of the American Association in 1884. Their record was 12-50.

Hollingshead died in his hometown of Washington, D.C. at the age of 73.
