= Charlie Mason (1870s outfielder) =

American baseball player (1853–1936)

- Outfielder
- Born: June 25, 1853; New Orleans, Louisiana, U.S.
- Died: October 21, 1936 (aged 83); Philadelphia, Pennsylvania, U.S.
- Batted: Right Threw: Right

MLB debut
- April 26, 1875, for the Philadelphia Centennials

Last MLB appearance
- July 4, 1883, for the Philadelphia Athletics

MLB statistics
- At bats: 82
- RBI: 5
- Home Runs: 0
- Batting average: .183
- Stats at Baseball Reference

Teams
- Philadelphia Centennials (1875); Washington Nationals (1875); Philadelphia Athletics (1883)

Charles E. Mason (June 25, 1853 – October 21, 1936) was an American professional baseball player who played from 1875–1883, primarily as an outfielder.

Mason was considered a pioneer of baseball in Philadelphia. When Mason fell in 1879, a benefit game was played between the city's top professionals at Recreation Park and the gate receipts donated to Mason. The Philadelphia Phillies and Philadelphia Athletics played an exhibition benefit game to honor Mason on April 10, 1928 at Shibe Park.
