= Lester Dole =

American baseball player (1855–1918)

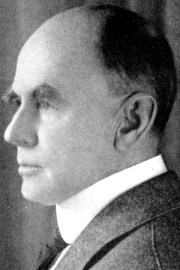
- Outfielder
- Born: July 8, 1855; Meriden, Connecticut, U.S.
- Died: December 10, 1918 (aged 63); Concord, New Hampshire, U.S.
- Batted: Unknown Threw: Unknown

MLB debut
- May 27, 1875, for the New Haven Elm Citys

Last MLB appearance
- May 27, 1875, for the New Haven Elm Citys

MLB statistics
- Batting average: .500
- Home runs: 0
- Runs batted in: 0
- Stats at Baseball Reference

Teams
- New Haven Elm Citys (1875)

Lester Carrington Dole (July 8, 1855 – December 10, 1918) was an American Major League Baseball outfielder who played in 1875 in one game with the New Haven Elm Citys.

He was born in Meriden, Connecticut. After baseball, he worked as the athletic trainer at St. Paul's School in Concord, New Hampshire for 40 years. He died from pneumonia in Concord on December 10, 1918.
