= Larry Ressler =

American baseball player (1848–1918)

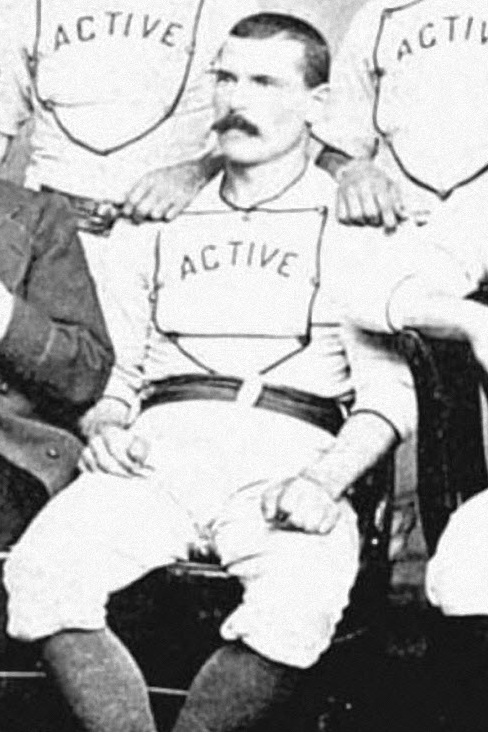
- Outfielder
- Born: August 10, 1848; Alsace-Lorraine, France
- Died: June 12, 1918 (aged 69); Reading, Pennsylvania
- Batted: Unknown Threw: Unknown

Major league debut
- April 26, 1875, for the Washington Nationals

Last major league appearance
- July 4, 1875, for the Washington Nationals

Major league statistics
- At bats: 108
- RBI: 5
- Home runs: 0
- Batting average: .194
- Stats at Baseball Reference

Teams
- Washington Nationals (1875)

Lawrence P. Ressler (August 10, 1848 – June 12, 1918) was an American professional baseball player. He was the first French-born major league baseball player.

== Biography ==
Larry Ressler was born in Alsace-Lorraine, France on October 10, 1848, and came to the United States in 1857. He enlisted in the 213th Pennsylvania Infantry Regiment at 14, and served for one year during the Civil War, before his mother arranged to have him discharged due to his age. Before playing baseball professionally, he worked as a molder.

He was the captain and manager of the Reading Actives in the minor leagues, and for the Washington Nationals during the 1875 season.

In later life he managed hotels, and was a police sergeant and civil servant. He was active in Democratic politics.

Larry Ressler died from gastritis at St. Joseph's Hospital in Reading, Pennsylvania on June 12, 1918.
