= Tim McGinley =

American baseball player (1854–1899)

- Catcher
- Born: 1854; Philadelphia, Pennsylvania, U.S.
- Died: November 2, 1899 (aged 44–45); Oakland, California, U.S.
- Batted: Unknown Threw: Unknown

MLB debut
- April 21, 1875, for the Philadelphia Centennials

Last MLB appearance
- May 15, 1876, for the Boston Red Caps

MLB statistics
- Batting average: .242
- Home runs: 0
- Runs scored: 23
- Stats at Baseball Reference

Teams
- Philadelphia Centennials (1875); New Haven Elm Citys (1875); Boston Red Caps (1876)

Timothy S. McGinley (born 1854 in Philadelphia – November 2, 1899 in Oakland, California) was an American Major League Baseball player who played catcher from 1875-1876. He would play for the Philadelphia Centennials, New Haven Elm Citys in the National Association in 1875 and for the Boston Red Caps in the newly-formed National League in 1876.

On April 22, 1876, McGinley was the starting catcher for the Red Caps in the NL's very first game, and recorded the first run in MLB history. McGinley would play a total of only 9 games at the major league level, scoring 5 runs.
