= Sam Field (baseball) =

American baseball player (1848–1904)

- Catcher
- Born: October 12, 1848; Philadelphia, Pennsylvania
- Died: October 28, 1904 (aged 56); Sinking Spring, Pennsylvania
- Batted: Right Threw: Right

MLB debut
- May 19, 1875, for the Philadelphia Centennials

Last MLB appearance
- May 10, 1876, for the Cincinnati Reds

MLB statistics
- Batting average: .146
- Home runs: 0
- RBI: 1
- Stats at Baseball Reference

Teams
- Philadelphia Centennials (1875); Washington Nationals (1875); Cincinnati Reds (1876)

Samuel Jay Field (October 12, 1848 – October 28, 1904) was an American professional baseball player who played in Major League Baseball (MLB) for the Philadelphia Centennials, Washington Nationals, and Cincinnati Reds in 1875 and 1876. He was primarily a catcher.

== Early life and amateur career ==
Field was born in Philadelphia in 1848. During the last two years of the American Civil War, he served in the United States Navy aboard the USS Richmond.

He began playing baseball in 1865, prior the formation of professional leagues. During the early years, he played for a Philadelphia team and caught for Cherokee Fisher. He played for 15 years and was regarded as "one of the leading baseball players" of his section of the country. The Sporting Life called him "one of the best catchers of his time."

== Professional career ==
During the 1875 season, Field appeared in three games for the Philadelphia Centennials and five games with the Washington Nationals of the National Association of Professional Base Ball Players. In 1876, he played in four games for the Cincinnati Reds of the National League, which were his last appearances in the major leagues. In 1877, Field played for the minor league Buffalo Bisons of the League Alliance until he suffered a season-ending thumb fracture in August. Later in life, Field played for the Reading Actives, of whom he was a part owner.

== Personal life and death ==
Field's younger brother, Jim Field, also played in the major leagues.

In his later years, Field was a fire chief and the proprietor of the Central Hotel in Sinking Spring, Pennsylvania. He died in Sinking Spring in 1904.
