= Sam Field =

Sam Field may refer to:

- Sam Field (baseball)
- Sam Field (footballer)
