= Jim Gilmore (baseball) =

American baseball player (1853–1928)

James Gilmore
- Catcher
- Born: May 1, 1853; Baltimore, Maryland
- Died: November 18, 1928 (aged 75); Baltimore, Maryland
- Batted: Unknown Threw: Unknown

MLB debut
- April 26, 1875, for the Washington Nationals

Last MLB appearance
- May 1, 1875, for the Washington Nationals

MLB statistics
- At bats: 12
- RBI: 0
- Home runs: 0
- Batting average: .250
- Stats at Baseball Reference

Teams
- Washington Nationals (1875)

James Gilmore (May 1, 1853 – November 18, 1928) was an American professional baseball player who played three games for the Washington Nationals during the 1875 season. He was born in Baltimore, Maryland and died there at the age of 75.
