= Robert Stevens (baseball) =

American baseball player

- Outfielder
- Born: January 1, 1855; San Francisco, California, U.S.
- Died: November 4, 1900 (aged 45); Seattle, Washington, U.S.
- Batted: Unknown Threw: Unknown

MLB debut
- May 4, 1875, for the Washington Nationals

Last MLB appearance
- May 4, 1875, for the Washington Nationals

MLB statistics
- Batting average: .250
- Home runs: 0
- Runs batted in: 0
- Stats at Baseball Reference

Teams
- Washington Nationals (1875)

Robert Edward Stevens (January 1, 1855 – November 4, 1900) was an American professional baseball player who played in one game for the 1875 Washington Nationals. He played the outfield and recorded one hit in four at-bats.
