= Walter Terry (baseball) =

American baseball player (1850–1908)

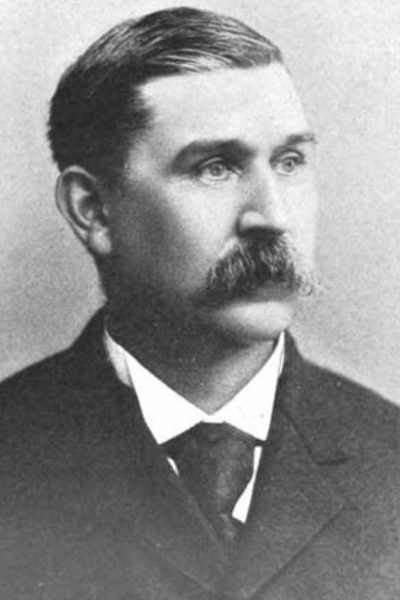
- First baseman/Outfielder
- Born: April 1850; Middletown, Pennsylvania, U.S.
- Died: February 20, 1908 (aged 57); Elizabeth, New Jersey, U.S.
- Batted: Unknown Threw: Unknown

MLB debut
- April 26, 1875, for the Washington Nationals

Last MLB appearance
- May 5, 1875, for the Washington Nationals

MLB statistics
- At bats: 22
- Hits: 4
- Batting average: .182
- Stats at Baseball Reference

Teams
- Washington Nationals (1875)

Walter W. Terry (April 7, 1850 – February 20, 1908) was an American first baseman and outfielder in Major League Baseball who played for the Washington Nationals of the National Association.

A native of Pennsylvania, Terry debuted with the Nationals in 1875, playing for them six games between April 26 and May 5 of that year. He went 4-for-22 for a .182 batting average, including a triple, and drove in two runs.

Terry died in Elizabeth, New Jersey, at the age of 57.

== Sources ==
- Baseball Reference
- Retrosheet
