= George Keerl =

American baseball player (1847–1923)

- Second baseman
- Born: April 10, 1847; Baltimore, Maryland, U.S.
- Died: September 9, 1923 (aged 76); Menominee, Michigan, U.S.
- Batted: Right Threw: Right

Major-league debut
- May 4, 1875, for the Chicago White Stockings

Last major-league appearance
- June 14, 1875, for the Chicago White Stockings

Major-league statistics
- At bats: 23
- Runs batted in: 3
- Home runs: 0
- Batting average: .130
- Stats at Baseball Reference

Teams
- Chicago White Stockings (1875)

George Henry Keerl (April 10, 1847 – September 9, 1923) was an American professional baseball player. In 1871, he played with the Active Club of Clinton, Iowa that upset the Chicago White Stockings. In 1874, he played for the Guelph Maple Leafs, and in 1875 he played in six major-league games for the Chicago White Stockings. He was born in Baltimore, Maryland and died in Menominee, Michigan at the age of 76.
