= Frank Heifer =

American baseball player (1854–1893)

- First baseman / Outfielder
- Born: January 18, 1854; Reading, Pennsylvania, U.S.
- Died: August 29, 1893 (aged 39); Reading, Pennsylvania, U.S.
- Batted: Unknown Threw: Unknown

MLB debut
- June 3, 1875, for the Boston Red Stockings

Last MLB appearance
- September 9, 1875, for the Boston Red Stockings

MLB statistics
- Games played: 11
- Batting average: .280
- Runs batted in: 5
- Stats at Baseball Reference

Teams
- Boston Red Stockings (1875)

Franklin "Heck" Heifer (January 18, 1854 – August 29, 1893) was an American first baseman and outfielder in the National Association for the 1875 Boston Red Stockings.
