= Paddy Quinn (baseball) =

American baseball player (1849–1909)

- Catcher/Outfielder
- Born: August 1849; Chicago, Illinois, U.S.
- Died: January 2, 1909 (aged 59); Chicago, Illinois, U.S.
- Batted: Switch Threw: Right

MLB debut
- July 26, 1871, for the Fort Wayne Kekiongas

Last appearance
- June 21, 1877, for the Chicago White Stockings

MLB statistics
- Batting average: .243
- Home runs: 0
- Runs batted in: 9
- Stats at Baseball Reference

Teams
- National Association of Base Ball Players Aetna of Chicago (1869-1871) League player Fort Wayne Kekiongas (1871) Keokuk Westerns (1875) Hartford Dark Blues (1875) Chicago White Stockings (1875, 1877)

Patrick James "Paddy" Quinn (August 1849 – January 2, 1909) was an American Major League Baseball catcher and outfielder during the 1870s.

== Early life ==
Quinn was born in Chicago in 1849, the son of police officer James Quinn, who was killed in the line of duty in 1853. Quinn played for the amateur club Aetna of Chicago beginning in 1869, at the dawn of the professional era.

== Professional career ==
Quinn's first professional experience was as a catcher in five games for the 1871 Fort Wayne Kekiongas of the National Association. He hit .235 with an on-base percentage of .381, scored eight runs, drove in two, and stole three bases.

Quinn returned to professional baseball in 1875, primarily as a catcher. He led the Keokuk Westerns in batting average (.326) with 14 hits, playing 11 of the 13 games the club completed before it went out of business. He moved on to Hartford and Chicago, playing 33 games in total and batting .265.

In 1876, after the formation of the National League, Quinn declined an offer to catch for the Cincinnati Reds.

In 1877, Quinn returned to the Chicago White Stockings and played four games in the outfield. He recorded one hit in 14 at-bats.

== Death ==
Quinn died at age 59 from unknown causes in his native Chicago in 1909.
