= John Glenn (1870s outfielder) =

American baseball player (1850–1888)

- Outfielder/First baseman
- Born: January 1850; Rochester, New York, U.S.
- Died: November 10, 1888 (aged 38); Sandy Hill, New York, U.S.
- Batted: Right Threw: Right

MLB debut
- May 13, 1871, for the Washington Olympics

Last MLB appearance
- September 28, 1877, for the Chicago White Stockings

MLB statistics
- Batting average: .267
- Home runs: 1
- Runs batted in: 157
- Stats at Baseball Reference

Teams
- National Association of Base Ball Players Washington Nationals (1870) Washington Olympics (1870) National Association of Professional BBP Washington Olympics 1871–1872 Washington Nationals 1872 Washington Blue Legs 1873 Chicago White Stockings 1874–1877

John W. Glenn (January 1850 – November 10, 1888) was an American Major League Baseball player for four teams during his seven-year career.

On November 10, 1888, Glenn died from injuries sustained from being accidentally shot the week prior by a police officer in Sandy Hill, New York. Glenn was accused of robbery and assaulting a 9-year-old girl, and the officer was attempting to protect him from a lynch mob.

== Bibliography ==
- Conner, Floyd (2002). Baseball's Most Wanted™: The Top 10 Book of the National Pastime's Outrageous Offenders, Lucky Bounces, and Other Oddities. Potomac Books, Inc. ISBN 9781574882292.
