= George Knight (baseball) =

American baseball player (1855–1912)

- Pitcher
- Born: November 24, 1855; Lakeville, Connecticut, U.S.
- Died: October 4, 1912 (aged 56); Salisbury, Connecticut, U.S.
- Batted: Unknown Threw: Unknown

MLB debut
- September 28, 1875, for the New Haven Elm Citys

Last MLB appearance
- September 28, 1875, for the New Haven Elm Citys

MLB statistics
- Win–loss record: 1–0
- Earned run average: 3.00
- Strikeouts: 0
- Stats at Baseball Reference

Teams
- New Haven Elm Citys (1875)

George Henry Knight (November 24, 1855 – October 4, 1912) was an American Major League Baseball player for the 1875 New Haven Elm Citys. He also umpired three games.

== Sources ==
- Career statistics from Baseball Reference · Retrosheet
