= Billy Riley (baseball) =

American baseball player (1855–1887)

- Outfielder
- Born: 1855; Cincinnati, Ohio, U.S.
- Died: November 9, 1887 (aged 31–32); Cincinnati, Ohio, U.S.
- Batted: Right Threw: Right

MLB debut
- May 4, 1875, for the Keokuk Westerns

Last MLB appearance
- September 30, 1879, for the Cleveland Blues

MLB statistics
- Games played: 51
- Batting average: .144
- Runs batted in: 10
- Stats at Baseball Reference

Teams
- Keokuk Westerns (1875); Cleveland Blues (1879)

William James Riley (1855–1887), nicknamed "Pigtail Billy", was an American outfielder in Major League Baseball. He played for the 1875 Keokuk Westerns and the 1879 Cleveland Blues.
