= Alfred Metcalfe =

American baseball player (1852–1914)

- Third baseman
- Born: December 31, 1852; Brooklyn, New York
- Died: September 2, 1914 (aged 61); Brooklyn, New York
- Batted: Unknown Threw: Unknown

MLB debut
- May 27, 1875, for the New York Mutuals

Last MLB appearance
- June 17, 1875, for the New York Mutuals

MLB statistics
- AVG: .219
- Hits: 7
- RBIs: 1
- Stats at Baseball Reference

Teams
- New York Mutuals (1875)

Alfred Tristram Metcalfe (December 31, 1852 – September 2, 1914) was a professional baseball player for the 1875 New York Mutuals.
