= Ed Somerville =

American baseball player (1853–1877)

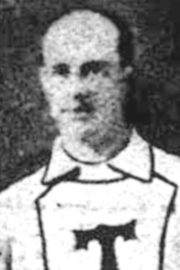
- Second baseman
- Born: March 1, 1853; Philadelphia, Pennsylvania, U.S.
- Died: October 1, 1877 (aged 24); London, Ontario, Canada
- Batted: Right Threw: Right

MLB debut
- April 21, 1875, for the Philadelphia Centennials

Last MLB appearance
- 1876, for the Louisville Grays

MLB statistics
- Batting average: .200
- Home runs: 0
- Runs batted in: 27
- Stats at Baseball Reference

Teams
- Philadelphia Centennials (1875); New Haven Elm Citys (1875); Louisville Grays (1876)

Edward G. Somerville (March 1, 1853 – October 1, 1877) was an American Major League Baseball player from 1875 to 1876. He played with the Philadelphia Centennials, New Haven Elm Citys, and Louisville Grays as an infielder. He had a .200 batting average for his career. At age 24, he died in London, Ontario where had had been playing for the London Tecumsehs. He had contracted a cold which led to a pulmonary hemorrhage.

== Sources ==
- Career statistics from MLB · Baseball Reference · Baseball Reference (Minors) · Retrosheet · Baseball Almanac
- Ed Somerville at the SABR Baseball Biography Project, by Jeremy Watterson. Retrieved July 31, 2026.
