= Steve Brady (baseball) =

American baseball player (1851–1917)

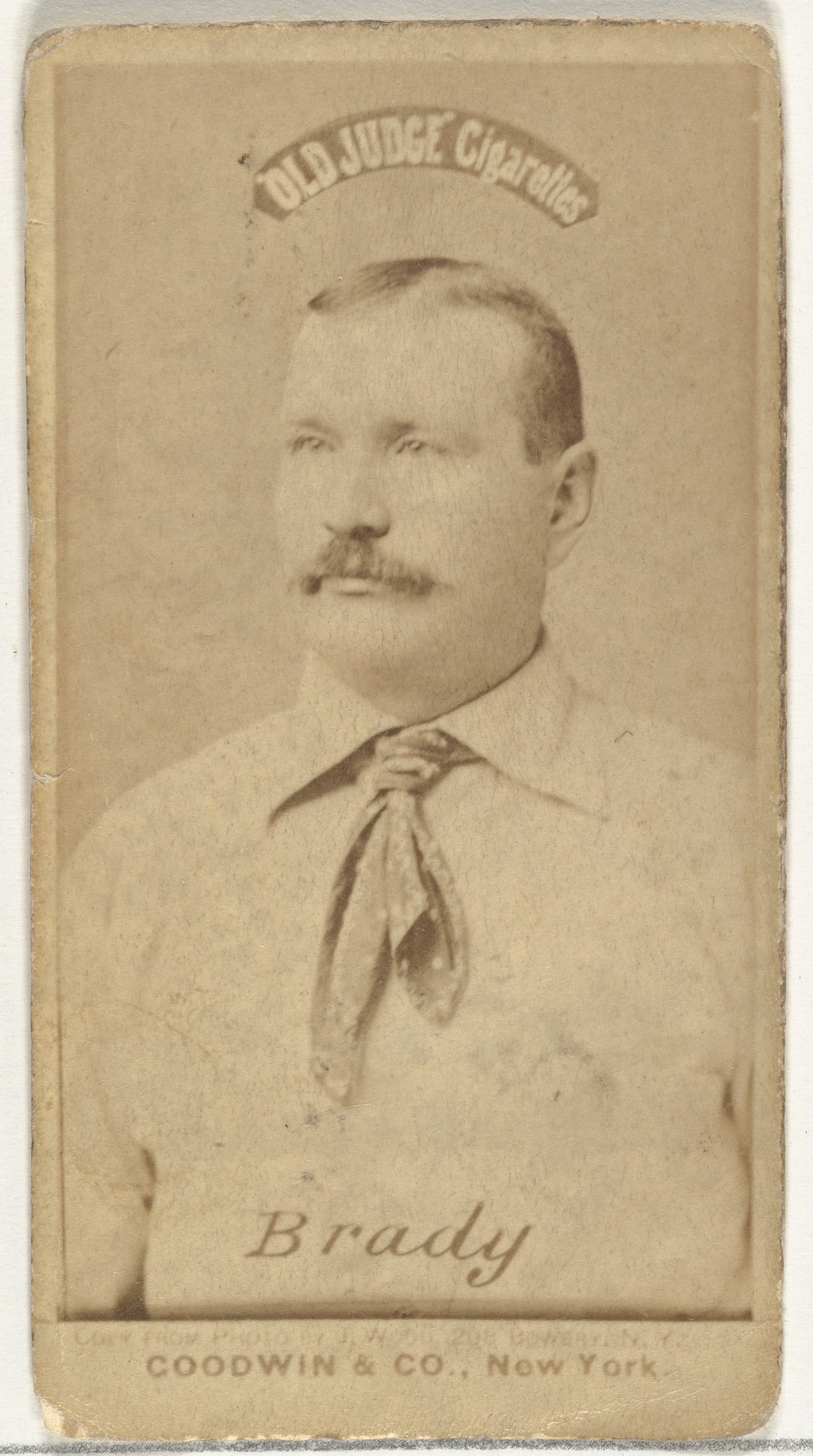
- Outfielder
- Born: July 14, 1851; Worcester, Massachusetts, U.S.
- Died: November 1, 1917 (aged 66); Hartford, Connecticut, U.S.
- Batted: Unknown Threw: Unknown

MLB debut
- July 23, 1874, for the Hartford Dark Blues

Last MLB appearance
- October 5, 1886, for the New York Metropolitans

MLB statistics
- Batting average: .261
- Home runs: 4
- Runs batted in: 114
- Stats at Baseball Reference

Teams
- Hartford Dark Blues (1874); Washington Nationals (1875); Hartford Dark Blues (1875); New York Metropolitans (1883–1886)

Stephen A. Brady (July 14, 1851 – November 1, 1917) was an American Major League Baseball player who was both an infielder and outfielder from 1874 to 1890. He would play for the Hartford Dark Blues, Washington Nationals, and New York Metropolitans.
