= Juice Latham =

American baseball player and manager (1852–1914)

- First baseman / Manager
- Born: September 6, 1852; Utica, New York, U.S.
- Died: May 26, 1914 (aged 61); Utica, New York, U.S.
- Batted: Right Threw: Right

MLB debut
- April 19, 1875, for the Boston Red Stockings

Last MLB appearance
- October 11, 1884, for the Louisville Eclipse

MLB statistics
- Batting average: .247
- Runs scored: 209
- RBIs: 101
- Managerial record: 45–48
- Managerial W%: .484
- Stats at Baseball Reference

Teams
- As player: Boston Red Stockings (1875); New Haven Elm Citys (1875); Louisville Grays (1877); Philadelphia Athletics (1882); Louisville Eclipse (1883–1884); As manager: New Haven Elm Citys (1875); Philadelphia Athletics (1882)

George Warren "Juice" Latham (September 6, 1852 – May 26, 1914), also known as "Jumbo" Latham, was an American professional baseball first baseman and manager. In his career, he played for five different teams in five seasons, while managing two of them.

== Career ==
Latham was born on September 16, 1852, in Utica, New York, and is credited as the first major league player from that city. He first played in professional organized baseball in 1875 for two teams in the National Association, the Boston Red Stockings, and the New Haven Elm Citys.

In 1877 and 1878, he was the first baseman and manager of the Canadian team, the London Tecumsehs of the International Association of Professional Base Ball Players.

He was still playing baseball as late as 1894 when he was playing first base for a team from Richfield Springs, New York. Latham died at the age of 61 in his hometown of Utica. He was buried at Forest Hill Cemetery in Utica.

== See also ==
- List of Major League Baseball player–managers
