= Spike Brady =

American baseball player (1854–??)

- Outfielder
- Born: December 1854; Chicago, Illinois, U.S.
- Died: Unknown
- Batted: Unknown Threw: Unknown

MLB debut
- September 25, 1875, for the Chicago White Stockings

Last MLB appearance
- September 25, 1875, for the Chicago White Stockings

MLB statistics
- Batting average: .250
- Home runs: 0
- Runs batted in: 0
- Stats at Baseball Reference

Teams
- Chicago White Stockings 1875

Michael T. "Spike" Brady (born December 1854) was an American baseball player. He was an outfielder for the Chicago White Stockings (the predecessors to the Chicago Cubs) in the National Association in 1875. He was born in Chicago.

Brady's major league experience consisted of exactly one game with the White Stockings on September 25, 1875. He had one hit (a triple) in four at-bats, scored a run, and had three errors in eight chances in center field.

Brady's date and place of death are unknown.
