= Fairview Park Fair Grounds =

Baseball field in Dover, Delaware

Fairview Park Fair Grounds was a baseball field located in Dover, Delaware. It was also known as Dover Grounds. It was used by the Philadelphia Athletics for one game on June 24, 1875. Philadelphia defeated the New Haven Elm Citys in that game 12–1.
