= John McKelvey =

American baseball player (1847–1944)

- Outfielder
- Born: August 27, 1847; Rochester, New York, U.S.
- Died: May 31, 1944 (aged 96); Rochester, New York, U.S.
- Batted: Right Threw: Right

MLB debut
- April 19, 1875, for the New Haven Elm Citys

Last MLB appearance
- October 28, 1875, for the New Haven Elm Citys

MLB statistics
- Batting average: .229
- Home runs: 0
- Runs batted in: 10
- Stats at Baseball Reference

Teams
- New Haven Elm Citys (1875)

John "Mac" Wellington McKelvey (August 27, 1847 – May 31, 1944) was an American professional baseball shortstop for the Rochester Alert amateur baseball team for a number of years and played one year for the professional New Haven Elm Citys in 1875.

== Baseball career ==
John McKelvey was born in 1847 in Rochester, New York and raised in the city. He played on a number of amateur teams in Rochester. In 1869, he joined the Rochester Alerts, an amateur baseball club. The Alerts played a number of regional and national teams and McKelvey gained a reputation for excellent defense.

In 1875, McKelvey joined the New Haven Elm Citys where he played for the entire season batting .229 with 10 RBIs. The next year, he rejoined the Rochester amateur team where he played for the remainder of his amateur career.

Records
Preceded by George Wright	Oldest recognized verified living baseball player August 21, 1937 – May 31, 1944	Succeeded by Charles Witherow
