= Centennial Grounds =

Baseball ground in Philadelphia, Pennsylvania

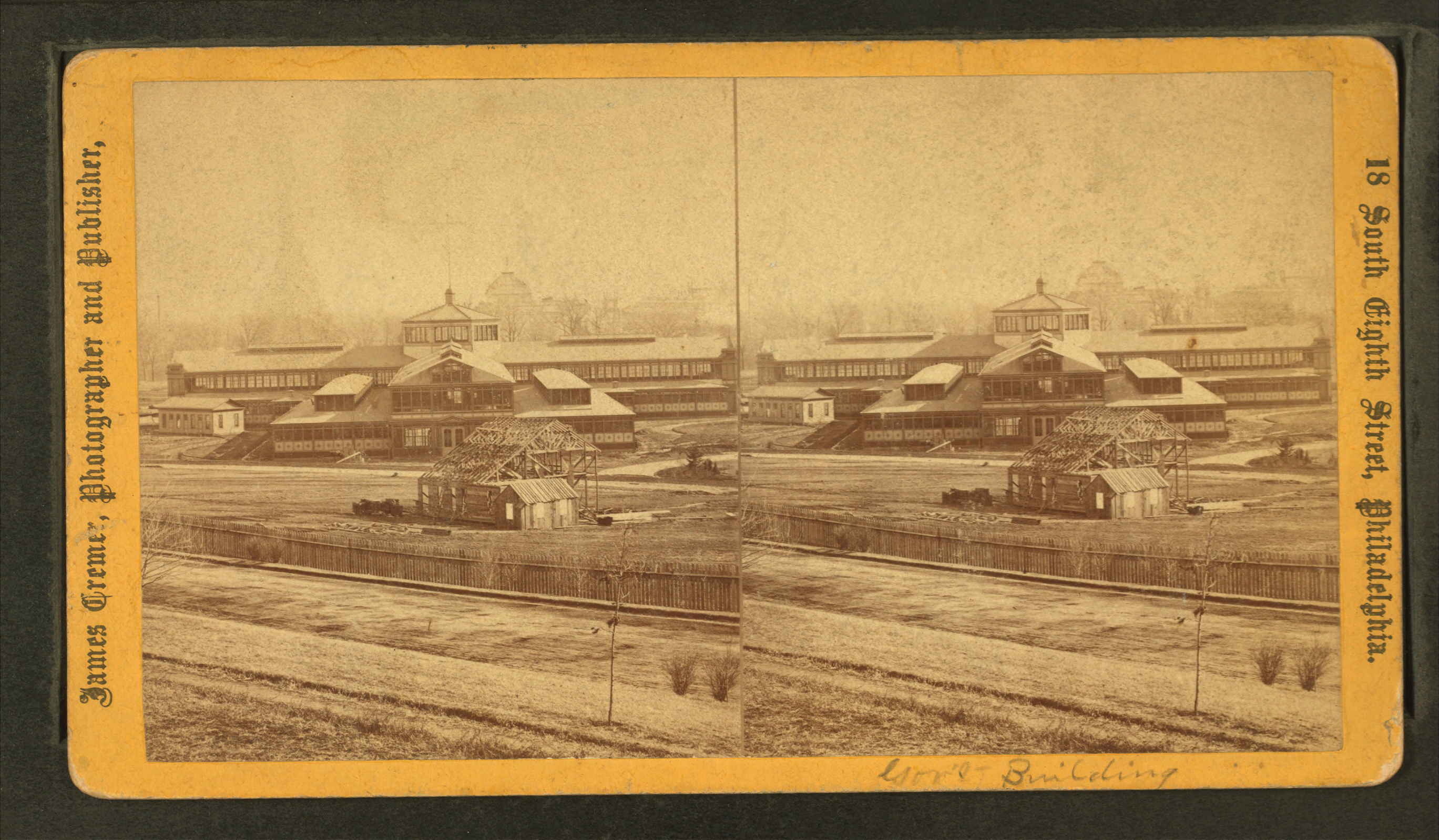
- Centennial Grounds. Government building.
- Interactive map of Centennial Grounds
- Location: Philadelphia, Pennsylvania
- Coordinates: 39.9927°N 75.1938°W
- Type: Baseball ground

Tenant
- Philadelphia Centennials

Centennial Grounds or Centennial Park was a baseball ground in Philadelphia, Pennsylvania. It was home to the short-lived Philadelphia Centennials baseball club of the National Association during the 1875 season, so it is considered a major league ballpark by those who count the NA as a major league. It was also the site of one home game by the Athletics. It occupied the same block as the later Recreation Park.
