= Dick Higham =

English baseball player and umpire (1851–1905)

- Right fielder / Umpire
- Born: July 24, 1851; Ipswich, England
- Died: March 18, 1905 (aged 53); Chicago, Illinois, U.S.
- Batted: Left Threw: Right

Major-league debut
- June 1, 1871, for the New York Mutuals

Last major-league appearance
- May 25, 1880, for the Troy Trojans

Major-league statistics
- Batting average: .307
- Home runs: 4
- Runs batted in: 204
- Stats at Baseball Reference

Teams
- As player: New York Mutuals (1871); Baltimore Canaries (1872); New York Mutuals (1873–1875); Chicago White Stockings (1875); Hartford Dark Blues (1876); Providence Grays (1878); Troy Trojans (1880); As manager: New York Mutuals (1874)

Richard Higham (July 24, 1851 – March 18, 1905) was an American professional baseball right fielder and umpire. He is known for being the only umpire to ever be banned from major-league baseball.

== Biography ==
Higham was born on July 24, 1851, in Ipswich, England. Higham's family migrated to the United States when he was two years old, and they settled in Hoboken, New Jersey.

During his career he was a very versatile player, fielding multiple positions, mainly as a right fielder and catcher with notable playing time as a second baseman as well. In 1871, he joined the New York Mutuals of the National Association during its inaugural season and played until the league was dissolved after the 1875 season, serving as player-manager in 1874. He then moved on to the newly formed National League, where he hit into the first NL triple play against the Mutuals on May 13, 1876. In 1877, he served as captain of the Syracuse Stars in the inaugural year of the International League, which was part of the League Alliance, with whom the National League had a working relationship.

== Umpire career and ban ==
After his playing days were over, he served as an umpire for two years (though rumors abounded that he was fixing games as a player). However, in 1882, William G. Thompson, owner of the Detroit Wolverines (and also mayor of Detroit) got suspicious about some of the calls Higham made against his team. He hired a private detective, who turned up several letters between Higham and a well-known gambler. Higham outlined a simple code—if the gambler received a telegram from him saying "Buy all the lumber you can", the gambler was to bet on Detroit. No telegram meant that the gambler was to bet on his opponent.

As a result of this evidence, Higham was fired as an umpire and banned from baseball. To date, he is the only umpire to have been banished from the game.

He moved back to Chicago, Illinois and became a bookkeeper. It was here where he died and was buried at Mount Hope Cemetery.

== See also ==
- List of Major League Baseball annual runs scored leaders
- List of Major League Baseball annual doubles leaders
- List of people banned from Major League Baseball
- Tim Donaghy
