= Dickey Pearce =

American baseball player (1836–1908)

- Shortstop
- Born: February 29, 1836; Brooklyn, New York, U.S.
- Died: September 18, 1908 (aged 72); Wareham, Massachusetts, U.S.
- Batted: Right Threw: Right

MLB debut
- May 18, 1871, for the New York Mutuals

Last MLB appearance
- October 6, 1877, for the St. Louis Brown Stockings

MLB statistics
- Batting average: .251
- Home runs: 2
- Runs batted in: 134
- Stats at Baseball Reference

Teams
- National Association of Base Ball Players Brooklyn Atlantics (1857–1870) Excelsior of Brooklyn (1866) League player New York Mutuals (1871–72) Brooklyn Atlantics (1873–74) St. Louis Brown Stockings (1875–77) League manager New York Mutuals (1872) St. Louis Brown Stockings (1875)

Richard J. Pearce (February 29, 1836 – September 18, 1908), known as Dickey Pearce, was an American professional baseball player and one of the sport's most famous early figures. He was born in Brooklyn, New York, and began playing with the Brooklyn Atlantics in 1857. He continued his career in the National Association and the early years of Major League Baseball. It is possible Pearce was one of the first baseball players to earn money for playing the game professionally. Pearce is given credit for pioneering the shortstop position. Pearce introduced his "tricky hit" to baseball, known today as the bunt. For much of his career, the rules permitted the ball to roll foul and still be a hit.

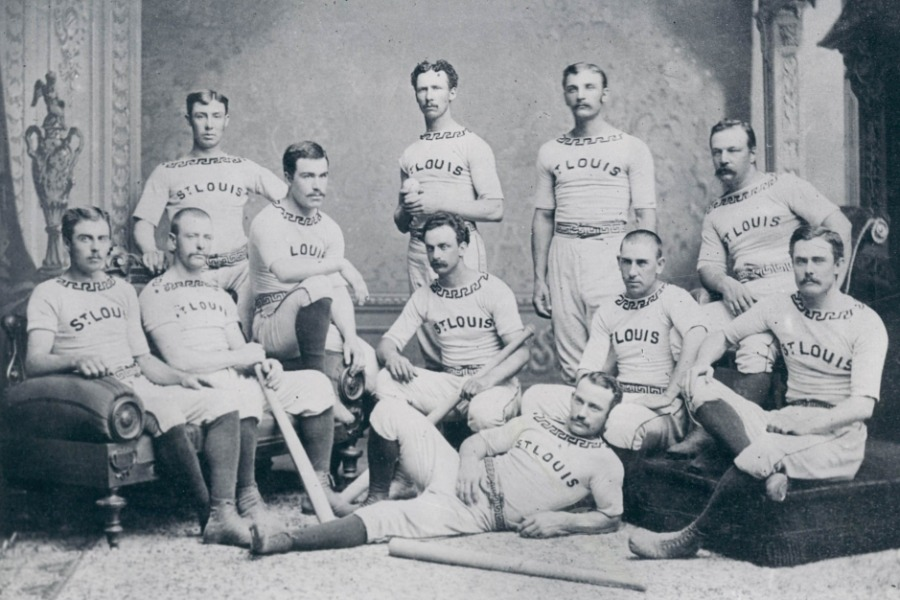
Dickey Pearce in the middle of the St. Louis Brown Stockings baseball team, 1876

Pearce played professionally for 22 years, spanning the generation from the game's beginnings to the National League. In the June 30, 1868 edition of the St. Louis Times, the paper said of him: "Pearce has been noted as a superior shortstop for ten years and to-day has no equal in the baseball field. He bats with great judgment and safety..." After retiring from playing, Pearce umpired into the mid-1880s.

Records
Preceded by Nate Berkenstock	Oldest recognized verified living baseball player February 23, 1900 – September 18, 1908	Succeeded by Al Barker
