= Joe Miller (second baseman) =

German baseball player (1850–1891)

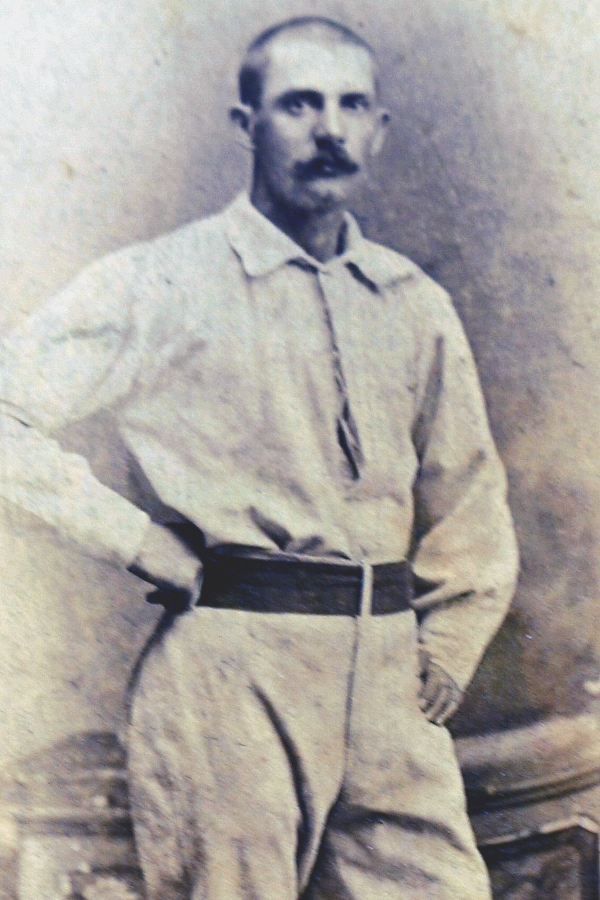
- Second baseman/Manager
- Born: July 24, 1850; Germany
- Died: August 28, 1891 (aged 41); White Bear Lake, Minnesota, U.S.
- Batted: Unknown Threw: Unknown

MLB debut
- June 26, 1872, for the Washington Nationals

Last MLB appearance
- July 28, 1875, for the Chicago White Stockings

MLB statistics
- Games: 29
- Runs: 5
- Batting average: .139
- Stats at Baseball Reference

Teams
- As player: Washington Nationals (1872); Keokuk Westerns (1875); Chicago White Stockings (1875); As manager: Washington Nationals (1872)

Joseph Wick Miller (July 24, 1850 – August 28, 1891) was a German-American second baseman and manager in Major League Baseball. He was born in Germany.

Miller began his career in 1872 as a player-manager for the Washington Nationals of the National Association. They were 0–11 and didn't finish the season. His next and final season was in 1875, playing for the Keokuk Westerns and the Chicago White Stockings, also of the National Association. He batted .139 in 29 games.

He died at the age of 41 in White Bear Lake, Minnesota.
