= George Trenwith =

American baseball player (1851–1890)

- Third baseman
- Born: c. 1851; Philadelphia, Pennsylvania, U.S.
- Died: February 1, 1890; Philadelphia, Pennsylvania, U.S.
- Batted: Unknown Threw: Unknown

MLB debut
- April 21, 1875, for the Philadelphia Centennials

Last MLB appearance
- October 28, 1875, for the New Haven Elm Citys

MLB statistics
- Batting average: .200
- Home runs: 0
- Run batted in: 7
- Stats at Baseball Reference

Teams
- Philadelphia Centennials (1875); New Haven Elm Citys (1875)

George W. Trenwith (c. 1851—February 1, 1890) was an American Major League Baseball player in 1875. He played with the Philadelphia Centennials and New Haven Elm Citys.

== Sources ==
- Career statistics from Baseball Reference · Retrosheet
