= Adam Rocap =

American baseball player (c. 1854 – 1892)

- Outfielder
- Born: c. 1854; Philadelphia, Pennsylvania, U.S.
- Died: March 29, 1892 (aged 37–38); Philadelphia, Pennsylvania, U.S.
- Batted: Unknown Threw: Unknown

MLB debut
- May 5, 1875, for the Philadelphia Athletics

Last MLB appearance
- October 28, 1875, for the Philadelphia Athletics

MLB statistics
- Games played: 16
- Batting average: .174
- Runs batted in: 4
- Stats at Baseball Reference

Teams
- Philadelphia Athletics (1875)

Adam Rocap (c. 1854 – March 29, 1892) was an American Major League Baseball player. Rocap played for the Philadelphia Athletics in 1875.

He was born in Philadelphia, Pennsylvania, where he died in 1892 from intestinal obstruction.
