= George Bechtel =

American baseball player (1848–1921)

- Right fielder / Pitcher
- Born: September 2, 1848; Philadelphia, Pennsylvania, U.S.
- Died: April 3, 1921 (aged 72); Philadelphia, Pennsylvania, U.S.
- Batted: Right Threw: Right

Major-league debut
- May 20, 1871, for the Philadelphia Athletics

Last major-league appearance
- August 19, 1876, for the Louisville Grays

Major-league statistics
- Batting average: .277
- Runs batted in: 165
- Win–loss record: 7-20
- Stats at Baseball Reference

Teams
- National Association of Base Ball Players West Philadelphia (1867) Geary of Philadelphia (1867–1868) Keystone of Philadelphia (1868–1869) Philadelphia Athletics (1870) League player Philadelphia Athletics (1871 New York Mutuals (1872) Philadelphia White Stockings (1873–1874) Philadelphia Centennials (1875) Philadelphia Athletics (1875) Louisville Grays (1876) New York Mutuals (1876)

George A. Bechtel (September 2, 1848 — April 3, 1921) was an American right fielder and pitcher in professional baseball's early history. He played in all five seasons of baseball's first all-professional league, the National Association, and later played in the first season of the National League, when the Association folded. In 1876, he became the first player in major-league history to be suspended for life for intentionally losing games for money.

== Career ==
Born in Philadelphia, Pennsylvania, Bechtel began his professional career in 1871 for the Philadelphia Athletics, when they joined the new National Association. Bechtel had played for the Athletics in 1870, and stayed with the team during its transformation from the previous version of the National Association. He batted .351 that season while playing in 20 of the team's 28 games, as the Athletics won the season's championship. Bechtel had also played for a couple of other Philadelphia teams during his amateur career before 1870. He was formerly of the Philadelphias in 1867, and the Keystones in both 1868 and 1869.

The following season, he signed with the New York Mutuals, who had offered him a higher salary in 1872, and batted .302 and scored 64 runs in the team's 54-game schedule. After just one season in New York, Bechtel moved back to Philadelphia, playing the next two seasons for the Philadelphia White Stockings with mixed success at the plate, batting .244 in 1873 and .278 in 1874. When the 1875 season began, he again moved, this time to the Philadelphia Centennials, and was their pitcher in all 14 games that the club played.

On May 26, 1875, after a 2–12 start, Bechtel and fellow Centennial Bill Craver were sold to the Philadelphia Athletics for $1,500. This is the first known sale of ballplayers from one team to another in baseball history. The sale was officially an enticement for the Centennials to fold, which they did.

== Expulsion ==
Rumors surrounded Bechtel's play ever since the late 1860s, indicating that he was a very good fielder, one of the better fielders of the day, but his play at times became sloppy. Henry Chadwick once stated regarding his play: "At the commencement of the season, Bechtel's play in left field was equal to any player, but, as the season wore on, he grew careless, and from other causes unnecessary to mention, he played poorly."

On May 30, 1876, in a game against the Mutuals, he made three of the team's nine errors, all three in crucial game situations. After the game, he became a "much suspected man" by the press and his team alike, so the team suspended him for crooked play.

On June 10, Bechtel wired teammate Jim Devlin a message stating "We can make $500 if you lose the game today. Tell John [manager Jack Chapman] and let me know at once. BECHTEL." Devlin wired him back explaining that he was not that kind of player, and presented the telegram to the team's management. Louisville immediately suspended him from the team. Bechtel was picked up by the Mutuals and played in a couple of games for them before the end of the season. The National League followed the lead of the Grays and suspended Bechtel before the 1877 season, and despite attempts for re-instatement, he was denied. Devlin himself was also banned for life the following season when he and a couple of teammates were paid for losing games. Bechtel had a stroke on April 1, 1921, and two days later he died at St. Mary's Hospital in Philadelphia.
