= Bill Parks =

American baseball player and manager (1849–1911)

- Pitcher/Left fielder
- Born: June 4, 1849; Easton, Pennsylvania, U.S.
- Died: October 10, 1911 (aged 62); Easton, Pennsylvania, U.S.
- Batted: Right Threw: Right

MLB debut
- April 26, 1875, for the Washington Nationals

Last MLB appearance
- April 22, 1876, for the Boston Red Stockings

MLB statistics
- Games played: 30
- Win–loss record: 4–8
- Batting average: .174
- Stats at Baseball Reference

Teams
- As player: Washington Nationals (1875); Philadelphia White Stockings (1875); Boston Red Stockings (1876); As manager: Washington Nationals (1875)

William Robert Parks (June 4, 1849 – October 10, 1911) was an American left fielder, pitcher, and manager in Major League Baseball from Easton, Pennsylvania.

A member of the 196th Pennsylvania Infantry Regiment during the American Civil War, he served as a vice-commander of the Department of Pennsylvania of the Grand Army of the Republic after the war.

== Formative years ==
Born in Easton, Pennsylvania on June 4, 1849, William R. Parks was a son of William R. Parks. According to Allentown's Morning Call newspaper, "When quite young he ran away three times to go to war. The first and second times his father brought him back, but when he saw the youngster was determined to go to the front, he left him have his own way on the third attempt." During that third attempt, he successfully enrolled with the 196th Pennsylvania Infantry Regiment.

== Baseball career ==
Parks played as both a pitcher and outfielder for the Washington Nationals and Philadelphia White Stockings, both of the National Association (whose major league status is not recognized by Major League Baseball), in 1875. He was also manager of the Nationals for the last eight games of the 1875 season, guiding them to a record of 1–7 after they had gone 4–16 under teammate Holly Hollingshead.

Then, in 1876, Parks played one game as an outfielder for the National League's Boston Red Caps. The April 22 game, however, just happened to be the first National League game ever played, and consequently is the first game recognized by modern-day MLB as a major league game. Parks went 0-for-4 at the plate, and made one error in four chances in left field in a 6-5 Red Caps victory...and there his career as a player ended. He was the only player in the historic first NL game, for either team, to never play professional baseball again.

Including his time in the National Association, in 16 games as a pitcher Parks was 4–8 with 9 complete games in 11 starts and an earned run average of 3.54. In 30 total games played he batted .174 with 6 runs batted in and 13 runs scored.

== Post-playing career ==
Following his departure from the Boston Red Caps, Parks returned home to Easton, where he became a barber and managed Easton's baseball team, which was part of the Atlantic League.

An active member of the Grand Army of the Republic's Lafayette Post in Easton, he served as the commander of that post for eight years and was also elected as the senior vice-commander of the G.A.R.'s Department of Pennsylvania.

== Death and interment ==
Parks died from heart disease in his hometown of Easton, Pennsylvania, at the age of 62, on October 10,1911, and was interred at Easton Cemetery.
