= George Gillpatrick =

American baseball player (1875–1941)

- Pitcher
- Born: February 28, 1875; Holden, Missouri, U.S.
- Died: December 14, 1941 (aged 66); Kansas City, Missouri, U.S.
- Batted: Right Threw: Right

MLB debut
- May 22, 1898, for the St. Louis Browns

Last MLB appearance
- August 7, 1898, for the St. Louis Browns

MLB statistics
- Win–loss record: 0-2
- Earned run average: 6.94
- Strikeouts: 12
- Stats at Baseball Reference

Teams
- St. Louis Browns (1898)

George Fred Gillpatrick (February 28, 1875 – December 14, 1941) was an American pitcher in Major League Baseball who played for the St. Louis Browns of the National League during the 1898 season. Listed at 6 ft 0 in (1.83 m), 210 lb., Gillpatrick threw right-handed. He was born in Holden, Missouri. Batting side is unknown.

In a one-season career, Gillpatrick posted a 0–2 record with a 6.94 ERA in seven appearances, including three starts and one complete game, giving up 38 runs (27 earned) on 42 hits and 19 walks while striking out 12 in 35.0 innings of work.

Gillpatrick died in Kansas City, Missouri, at the age of 66.
