= Philadelphia Centennials =

Defunct American baseball team

The Centennial baseball club, or Philadelphia Centennials in modern nomenclature, were a short-lived baseball team in the National Association in 1875. They were named the Centennial club during a time when the city of Philadelphia was busy making preparations for the national centennial in 1876. The ball club, however, did not live to see the actual centennial. They won 2 games, lost 12, and with two other Philadelphia professional clubs in the league the Centennials did not finish out the season.

Their home games were played at Centennial Grounds, whose lot was later the footprint for Recreation Park which would be the first home of the Philadelphia Phillies.

The Centennials were managed by infielder Bill Craver, who was also one of their best hitters (.277). Pitcher George Bechtel (2-12, 3.93) led the team in batting average (.279), RBI (7), runs (12), and doubles (5).

== See also ==
- 1875 Philadelphia Centennials season
