= New Haven Elm Citys =

Defunct American baseball team

The Elm City baseball club, or New Haven Elm Citys in modern nomenclature, were a professional baseball team based in New Haven, Connecticut ("The Elm City"). They existed for one season, in the National Association of Professional Base Ball Players in 1875. The Elm Citys played 47 games during their existence, and had a win–loss record of 7–40 (.149).

The Elm Citys had three managers throughout their one season: Charlie Gould (2–21, .087), Jumbo Latham (4–14, .222), and Charlie Pabor (1–5, .167). They played their home games at the Howard Avenue Grounds. It is considered a major league team by those who count the National Association of Professional Base Ball Players as a major league.

== See also ==
- 1875 New Haven Elm Citys season
- Rit Harrison
