= Washington Nationals (National Association) =

American baseball team of the 1870s

The Washington Nationals of the 1870s were the first important baseball club in the capital city of the United States. They competed briefly in the National Association of Professional Base Ball Players (commonly referred to as the National Association), (Note: The National Association of Professional Base Ball Players (1871–1875) was distinct from the later National Base Ball Association (1879–1880), also referred to as the "National Association", which also included a team known as the Washington Nationals.) the first fully-professional sports league in baseball. The Nationals are considered a major-league team by those who count the National Association as a major league. Several other baseball clubs based in Washington, D.C., have also used the historic name Nationals.

The team played their home games at the Nationals Grounds and the Olympics Grounds. They joined the National Association in 1872, playing 11 games that year, and 39 more games in 1873, although some sources recognize the 1873 team as a different franchise named the Washington Blue Legs. Following poor on-field results over that period, that team disbanded after the 1873 season. Another Nationals team was fielded with some of the same players for the 1875 season, but folded before the end of the season.

== Pre-NA ==
The first team in Washington, the Potomac Club, was formed in the summer of 1859, and the Nationals were formed in November of the same year; both teams consisted mostly of government clerks. The two teams practiced in the backyard of the White House and played each other in the spring of 1860; the Nationals consistently lost to the superior Potomacs, but the latter disbanded on the outbreak of the Civil War while the Nationals kept playing, and by the end of the war were "solidly in the esteem of Washington fans, with the club's shortstop, slight, 23-year-old Arthur Pue Gorman, the darling of the spectators. Young Gorman quickly rose to stardom on the not-too-brilliant Nationals." (Gorman later became a U.S. Senator from Maryland and a power in the Democratic Party in the late 19th century).

In the summer of 1865 the Nationals invited the Philadelphia Athletics and Brooklyn Atlantics, two of the major teams of the era, to Washington, losing to the former 87–12 and to the latter 34–19, before 6,000 spectators, including President Johnson. They "jealously guarded their amateur status by refusing all payments, including travel expenses."

By 1867, the Nationals were much improved, and the new national network of railroads prompted them "to do the previously unthinkable by becoming the first Eastern team to venture west of the Alleghenies." They defeated the best the locals had to offer, crushing Columbus 90–10, the Cincinnati Red Stockings 53–10, and the Cincinnati Buckeyes 88–12, beating Louisville, Indianapolis, and St. Louis as well before falling to the Rockford Forest Citys (with future Hall of Famer Albert Spalding) 29–23. The Nats ended the road trip the next day by beating the Chicago Excelsiors 49–4. The "considerable expenses" of the tour were made possible by generous sponsors and "by the indulgence of the Treasury Department."

Washington was one of the early homes of commercialism:

One writer, Thomas Henry, said the U. S. Treasury Department was "the real birthplace of professional base ball in Washington." As a source of patronage for good players, this department was widely exploited after the Civil War. In addition, Washington players benefited from the collection plates passed at games. By this kind of enterprise Washington clubs were able to keep a cadre of good players and to offer excellent accommodations. In 1867 the Nationals' park was located on a field four hundred feet square, surrounded by a ten foot fence, and shaded on the north side by roofed stands. To discourage gamblers, a sign which read "Betting Positively Prohibited" was posted.

== 1872 ==
The 1872 Nationals home games were played at Olympics Grounds in Washington, D.C. They lost all 11 games before going out of business. The manager for this season is listed as either Warren White or Joe Miller. The team's leading players include: 1B Paul Hines, 2B Holly Hollingshead, and SS Jacob Doyle.

== 1873 ==
They won 8 games and lost 31. The Blue Legs were managed by Nick Young. Their top hitter was left fielder Paul Hines, who went 60-for-181, a batting average of .331.

== 1875 ==
Although there isn't a firm consensus on whether the 1875 Washington team was the same franchise as the 1872 one, the team fielded for this season fared better, as they won 5 games and lost 23. Hollingshead was again their top hitting regular, though with a much lower batting average of .247. He was also one of the club's managers, along with Bill Parks.

The Washingtons went out of business in St. Louis, Missouri, after playing the local Red Stockings on July 3 and July 4. Next day the players announced by telegraph that a club official had absconded with the funds but (Ryczek 1992: 194) concludes that "the tale had been planted by the players in an effort to find enough good samaritans to foot the bill for the trip home". The club probably failed by "unappealing play" and consequent receipts too small to support travel. On the final trip, they lost two in Philadelphia and five of six in St. Louis. The final game was a 12–5 victory but the two local teams outscored Washington 42–5 in the first five games, which must have been repelling.
