= 1875 in baseball =

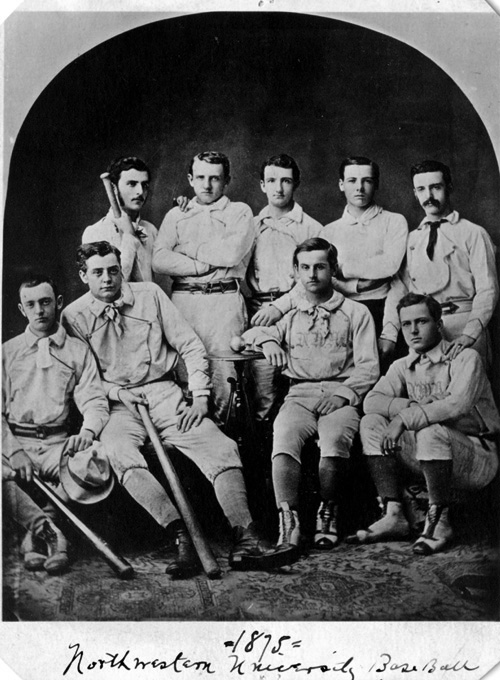

The following are the baseball events of the year 1875 throughout the world.

== Champions ==
- National Association: Boston Base Ball Club

== Statistical leaders ==
National Association
Stat	Player	Total
AVG	Deacon White (BOS)	.367
HR	Jim O'Rourke (BOS)	6
RBI	Cal McVey (BOS)	87
W	Al Spalding (BOS)	54
ERA	Pud Galvin (SLB)	1.16
K	Candy Cummings (HAR)	82

== National Association final standings ==
National Association	W	L	T	Pct.	GB
Boston Red Stockings	71	8	3	.884	—
Philadelphia Athletics	53	20	4	.714	15
Hartford Dark Blues	54	28	3	.653	18½
St. Louis Brown Stockings	39	29	2	.571	26½
Philadelphia White Stockings	37	31	2	.543	28½
Chicago White Stockings	30	37	2	.449	35
New York Mutuals	30	38	3	.444	35½
New Haven Elm Citys	7	40	—	.149	48
Washington Nationals	5	23	—	.179	40½
St. Louis Red Stockings	4	15	—	.211	37
Philadelphia Centennials	2	12	—	.143	36½
Brooklyn Atlantics	2	42	—	.045	51½
Keokuk Westerns	1	12	—	.077	37

== Notable seasons ==
- Boston Red Stockings pitcher Al Spalding has a record of 54–5 and leads the NA in wins. His 570.2 innings pitched ranks second in the league. He has 75 strikeouts, a 1.59 earned run average, and a 136 ERA+. At the plate, he has a .312 batting average and a 134 OPS+.
- Boston Red Stockings first baseman Calvin McVey leads the NA with 87 runs batted in and a .873 OPS. His 138 hits and 192 OPS+ both rank second in the league. He has a .355 batting average and 89 runs scored.

== Events ==
=== April–June ===
- May 3 – The Hartfords are caught using an illegal bat which had been whittled nearly flat on one side and painted black to conceal the altering. The bat is thrown out and Hartford goes on to win the game.
- May 5 – National of Washington gives up 20+ runs for the 5th consecutive game.
- May 11 – The Red Stockings of St. Louis fall to the Chicagos 1–0, the lowest scoring game ever at the time.
- May 21 – Only 10 days after it happened for the first time, the NA sees its second 1–0 game as Candy Cummings of Hartford outduels Bobby Mathews of Mutual.
- May 22 – Pud Galvin makes his debut with the St. Louis Club. Galvin will only pitch in 8 games for St. Louis and will not be seen in the major leagues again until 1879.
- June 11 – George Hall of the Philadelphia Athletics, who will finish 2nd in the league with 4, homers in consecutive at-bats.

=== July–September ===
- July 20 – Harry Wright learns that Albert Spalding, Deacon White, Ross Barnes and Cal McVey will jump to Chicago for the 1876 season. The Chicago Tribune reports that Wright will return to Cincinnati to start a new team.
- July 21 – Joe Start of Mutual hits 3 home runs and a triple in a Mutuals victory.
- July 28 – Joe Borden of Philadelphia pitched professional baseball's first no-hitter in defeating Chicago 4–0.
- September 6 – The Bostons win their 4th pennant in a row roughly 6 weeks sooner than they had in the previous 3 seasons. Boston clinches with 16 games left to play in the schedule.
- September 11 – The first professional women's game is played in Springfield, Illinois on a half-sized field. The "Blondes" defeat the "Brunettes" 42–38.
- September 24 – George Gage, President of the Chicago Base Ball Club, passes away after suffering a stroke. William Hulbert will take over the team and drive the final nail in the NA's coffin by starting the National League during the off-season.
- September 25 – Paul Hines commits 10 errors at 2nd base for Chicago in a loss.

=== October–December ===
- October 10 – At a meeting of Chicago Base Ball Club stockholders, William Hulbert uses a proxy from the widow of the deceased George Gage to declare himself President of the team. He names Albert Spalding as Secretary.
- October 30 – Boston defeats Hartford 7–4 in what proves to be the final game in the history of the NA. The Bostons claim the last 4 pennants in increasingly dominating fashion after the Athletics win the inaugural flag in 1871.

== Births ==
- 1875 – Bill Magee (Note: Some sources show 1864)
- January 7 – Kitty Bransfield
- January 20 – C. I. Taylor
- January 20 – Ernie Courtney
- January 24 – Bunk Congalton
- February 1 – Billy Sullivan
- February 18 – Walter Thornton
- February 21 – Luther Taylor
- February 25 – Johnny Kling (Note: Some sources show November 13)
- February 28 – George Gillpatrick
- March 3- John Kerin
- March 14 – Wilbur Murdoch
- March 28 – Jimmy Barrett
- March 28 – Harry Gleason
- April 2 – Ed Siever (Note: Some sources show 1877)
- April 11 – Ossee Schreckengost
- April 12 – Joe Corbett
- April 13 – Kid Elberfeld
- May 29 – Dave Fultz
- June 25 – Bill Phyle
- August 6 – Brownie Foreman
- August 21 – Frank Isbell
- August 31 – Eddie Plank
- September 4 – Jack Gilbert
- November 25 – Freddy Parent
- November 30 – Myron Grimshaw
- December 2 – Mike Kelley
- December 4 – Joe Corbett
- December 17 – Jim McHale

== Deaths ==
- February 14 – Charlie Hodes, 26?, catcher/utility player from 1871 to 1874.
- July 22 – Eb Smith, 28, umpire for one game during the 1872 National Association season.
