= National Association of Professional Base Ball Players =

American professional baseball league in the late 19th century

- Sport: Baseball
- Founded: March 17, 1871 (155 years ago)
- Folded: 1875; 151 years ago
- No. of teams: 1871–1875: (Note: Counts reflect the number of teams listed in the final standings for each season by Retrosheet; not all teams played a full season.) 9, 11, 9, 8, 13
- Country: United States of America
- Most titles: Boston Red Stockings (4)

The National Association of Professional Base Ball Players (NAPBBP), often known simply as the National Association (NA), was the first fully-professional sports league in baseball. The National Association was founded in 1871 and continued through the 1875 season. Whether it should be considered a "major league" continues to be a matter of differing opinion between baseball writers, historians, and others.

The National Association incorporated several professional clubs from the National Association of Base Ball Players (NABBP) of 1857–1870, sometimes called "the amateur Association". In turn, several National Association clubs created the succeeding National League of Professional Baseball Clubs (the National League, founded in 1876). The National League and the American League of Professional Baseball Clubs (the American League, founded in 1901) later entered a "peace treaty", the National Agreement of 1903, recognizing each other as legitimate major leagues. Following nearly a century of cooperation, the National League and American League eventually merged into one organization in 2000 as Major League Baseball (MLB).

== History ==
In 1869, the previously amateur National Association of Base Ball Players, in response to concerns that some teams were paying players, established a professional category. The Cincinnati Red Stockings were the first team to declare their desire to become fully professional. Other teams quickly followed suit. By 1871, several clubs, wanting to separate fully from the amateur association, broke away to found the National Association of Professional Base Ball Players. (The remaining amateur clubs founded the National Association of Amateur Base Ball Players, which only lasted two years). In 1876, wanting an even stronger central organization, six clubs from the NA and two independents established the National League: Boston Red Stockings, Hartford, Mutual, Athletic, Chicago, and the St. Louis Brown Stockings from the NA plus independent clubs Louisville and Cincinnati.

Several factors limited the lifespan of the National Association including dominance by a single team (Boston) for most of the league's existence, instability of franchises as several were placed in cities too small to financially support professional baseball, lack of central authority, and suspicions of the influence of gamblers.

=== Major league status question ===
Whether to cover the NA as a major league is a recurring matter of difference in historical work on American baseball among historians, encyclopedists, database builders, and others. Major League Baseball does not recognize it as a major league, but the NA comprised most of the professional clubs and the highest caliber of play then in existence. Its players, managers, and umpires are included among the "major leaguers" who define the scope within baseball references such as Retrosheet.

In 1969, Major League Baseball's newly formed Special Baseball Records Committee decided that the National Association should be excluded from major league status, citing the association's "erratic schedule and procedures" as well as a history of gambling and "poor newspaper coverage". Thus, when the landmark 1969 Macmillan Baseball Encyclopedia was published, National Association records were not included in totals for such early stars as Cap Anson. Arguments against including the NA as a major league generally revolve around the league's quality of play, significant differences in the sport's rules during the era, and the instability of the league (as many teams lasted only one season or part of a season), and the poor state of the NA records.

The Special Baseball Records Committee's decision has faced continuing criticism. Oft-cited arguments in favor of the National Association are its status as the first fully professional baseball league, the fact that several of its teams continued on as part of the National League when it was founded in 1876, and the much more complete state of National Association records today than they were in 1969, thanks to research efforts by a number of baseball historians. In 1982, Sports Illustrated writer Marc Onigman argued that the NA should be included in the major leagues, despite its acknowledged flaws, pointing out the same flaws existed in other leagues as well, and called the Committee's decision "a modern-day value judgment that doesn't hold up". The committee's decision has been criticized for favoring the owner-run National League over the player-dominated National Association. David Nemec's The Great Encyclopedia of Nineteenth-Century Major League Baseball includes players' National Association statistics in their major league totals; Nemec states that his compendium "is not bound by major league baseball's decision to treat its statistics separately", points out that "the National Association contained most of the best professional players of its time", and also argues that the National Association is more entitled to major league status than the 1884 Union Association (which has been officially recognized as a major league by Major League Baseball). The editors of The 2007 ESPN Baseball Encyclopedia also registered their disagreement with the NA's exclusion, arguing that the NA "was indisputably the Major League Baseball of its day", but they nevertheless decided not to combine their NA records with later leagues, to avoid confusing conflicts with totals shown in the "official records".

== Member clubs ==
Professional baseball clubs in the 19th century were often known by what is now regarded as a "nickname", although it was actually the club's name. This was a practice carried over from the amateur days. The singular form of a "nickname" was often the team name itself, with its base city "understood" and was so listed in the standings; for example the Atlantic Base Ball Club, which was located in Brooklyn. Rather than "Brooklyn Atlantics", the team was simply called "Atlantic", or "Atlantic of Brooklyn" if deemed necessary by the writer. Another common practice was to refer to the team in the plural, hence the "Bostons" the "Chicagos" or the "Mutuals". Frequently sportswriters would apply a creative pseudonym to call the team by in newspaper articles, often using one with something to do with the team colors, such as the Red Stockings or Red Caps (Boston), White Stockings (Chicago), Green Stockings (Mutual of New York), and Canaries (the yellow-uniformed Lord Baltimore).

This practice of using the singular form of the "nickname" as the team name faded with time, although as recently as the early 1900s the team generally known as "Philadelphia Athletics" was shown in the American League standings as the traditional way of "Athletic". That team sported a blackletter-style "A" on its jerseys, as had previous teams based in Philadelphia and using the same name.

Later, the Encyclopedia of Baseball attempted to retrofit the names into a modern context. In the following list, the bold names are the names most often used by contemporary newspapers in league standings, and the linked names after them are those typically ascribed to the teams now, using the Encyclopedia of Baseball standard.

- Boston – Boston Red Stockings (1871–1875)
- Chicago – Chicago White Stockings (1871, 1874–1875)
- Forest City – Cleveland Forest Citys (1871–1872)
- Kekionga – Fort Wayne Kekiongas (1871)
- Mutual – New York Mutuals (1871–1875)
- Athletic – Philadelphia Athletics (1871–1875)
- Forest City – Rockford Forest Citys (1871) (A second league club with the same name as the Cleveland entry)
- Troy or Union – Troy Haymakers (1871–1872)
- Olympic – Washington Olympics (1871–1872; 1875)
- Atlantic – Brooklyn Atlantics (1872–1875)
- Eckford – Brooklyn Eckfords (1872)
- Lord Baltimore – Baltimore Canaries (1872–1874)
- Mansfield – Middletown Mansfields (1872)
- National – Washington Nationals (1872; 1875) Washington Blue Legs (1873)
- Maryland – Baltimore Marylands (1873) (played at Madison Avenue Grounds)
- Philadelphia – Philadelphia White Stockings (1873–1875) (also sometimes called "Pearls" or "Phillies")
- Resolute – Elizabeth Resolutes (1873)
- Hartford – Hartford Dark Blues (1874–1875)
- Centennial – Philadelphia Centennials (1875)
- Elm City – New Haven Elm Citys (1875)
- St. Louis – St. Louis Brown Stockings (1875)
- St. Louis Reds – St. Louis Red Stockings (1875) (this club's jerseys featured an actual image of a red stocking, making this an "official" name).
- Western – Keokuk Westerns (1875)

== Champions ==
Before 1883, team order in baseball standings was determined by the number of games a team won, not by winning percentage. For each of the five NA seasons, the league champion had both the most games won and the best winning percentage. The placement of other clubs may vary—for example, the 1872 Philadelphia Athletics finished in fourth place (based on their win total), while recording the second-best winning percentage. The NA did not have a postseason; champions were determined by final standings at the end of the season.

Season	Champion	Record (win pct.)†	Manager	Ref.
1871	Philadelphia Athletics	21–7 (.750)	Dick McBride	
1872	Boston Red Stockings	39–8–1 (.830)	Harry Wright	
1873	Boston Red Stockings	43–16–1 (.729)	Harry Wright	
1874	Boston Red Stockings	52–18–1 (.743)	Harry Wright	
1875	Boston Red Stockings	71–8–3 (.899)	Harry Wright	

† Individual statistics from tie games count towards players' career totals, but tie games are excluded when computing winning percentage and games behind.

== Presidents ==
- James W. Kerns 1871
- Robert V. Ferguson 1872–1875

== Players in the Hall of Fame ==
Eight people who played in the NA have been inducted into the National Baseball Hall of Fame:

- Cap Anson
- Candy Cummings
- Pud Galvin
- Jim O'Rourke
- Albert Spalding
- Deacon White
- George Wright
- Harry Wright

George Wright was the first NA inductee (1937) and Deacon White is the most recent (2013). Four of the eight had significant playing careers in the National League or other major leagues after their time in the NA: Anson, Galvin, O'Rourke, and White, each of whom was inducted into the Hall of Fame as a player. The other four—Cummings, Spalding, and brothers George and Harry Wright—were each inducted into the Hall as an "executive", a Hall of Fame category that includes pioneers of the game. Cummings is notable for being the pitcher credited with inventing the curveball.

== Lifetime leaders ==
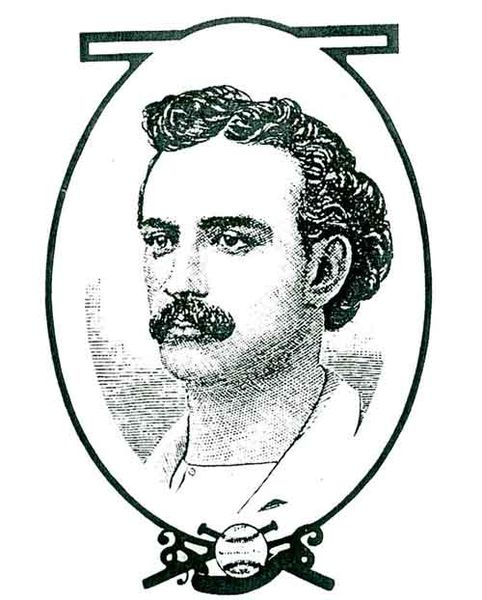
Lip Pike

Statistic	Leader	Number
Games	Andy Leonard	286
Hits	Ross Barnes	540
Runs	Ross Barnes	462
Wins (pitching)	Albert Spalding	207
Home runs	Lip Pike	16
Runs batted in	Cal McVey	276

== Sources ==
- David Pietrusza Major Leagues: The Formation, Sometimes Absorption and Mostly Inevitable Demise of 18 Professional Baseball Organizations, 1871 to Present Jefferson (NC): McFarland & Company, 1991. ISBN 0-89950-590-2
- William J. Ryczek Blackguards and Red Stockings: A History of Baseball's National Association Jefferson (NC): McFarland & Company, 1999. ISBN 978-0-9673718-0-1
