= Philadelphia Athletics (1871–1876) all-time roster =

List of baseball players

The Philadelphia Athletics baseball club, established 1860, played five seasons in the National Association, 1871–1875, and one in the National League, 1876. Here is a list of all their players in regular season games beginning 1871.

See also Category:Philadelphia Athletics (NABBP) players

† Bold names identify members of the National Baseball Hall of Fame.

== A ==
- Cap Anson^{†}

== B ==
- Joe Battin
- George Bechtel
- John Bergh
- Nate Berkenstock
- Tom Berry
- Doc Bushong

== C ==
- John Clapp
- William Coon
- Bill Craver
- John Curran
- Ned Cuthbert

== E ==
- Dave Eggler

== F ==
- Cherokee Fisher
- Wes Fisler
- Dickie Flowers
- Davy Force
- Bill Fouser

== G ==
- Count Gedney
- Henry Gilroy

== H ==
- George Hall
- George Heubel

== K ==
- Lon Knight

== L ==
- Flip Lafferty

== M ==
- Denny Mack
- Fergy Malone
- Dick McBride
- Mike McGeary
- John McMullin
- Levi Meyerle
- Tom Miller
- John Mullen
- Tim Murnane

== O ==
- Lou Paul
- Nealy Phelps
- Tom Pratt

== R ==
- John Radcliffe
- Al Reach
- John Richmond
- Whitey Ritterson
- Adam Rocap

== S ==
- Count Sensenderfer
- Ezra Sutton

== T ==
- Fred Treacey

== W ==
- Jim Ward
- Fred Warner

== Z ==
- George Zettlein
