= 1876 Philadelphia Athletics season =

1876 Philadelphia Athletics
- League: National League
- Ballpark: Jefferson Street Grounds
- City: Philadelphia, Pennsylvania
- Record: 14–45 (.237)
- League place: 7th
- Owner: Thomas J. Smith
- Manager: Al Wright

After five seasons in the National Association, the 1876 Philadelphia Athletics finished the first season of the National League with a record of 14–45, good for 7th place. It would prove to be their only season in the league, as they were expelled from the league as punishment for refusing to make a late-season road trip.

== Regular season ==
- April 22, 1876: The Athletics played in the first game in National League history, losing to the Boston Red Caps, 6-5.

=== Season standings ===
National League
Team	W	L	Pct.	GB	Home	Road
Chicago White Stockings	52	14	.788	—	25‍–‍6	27‍–‍8
Hartford Dark Blues	47	21	.691	6	23‍–‍9	24‍–‍12
St. Louis Brown Stockings	45	19	.703	6	24‍–‍6	21‍–‍13
Boston Red Caps	39	31	.557	15	19‍–‍17	20‍–‍14
Louisville Grays	30	36	.455	22	15‍–‍16	15‍–‍20
New York Mutuals	21	35	.375	26	13‍–‍20	8‍–‍15
Philadelphia Athletics	14	45	.237	34½	10‍–‍24	4‍–‍21
Cincinnati Reds	9	56	.138	42½	6‍–‍24	3‍–‍32

=== Record vs. opponents ===
1876 National League record Sources:
Team	BSN	CHI	CIN	HAR	LOU	NYM	PHN	STL
Boston	—	1–9	10–0	2–8	5–5	8–2	9–1	4–6
Chicago	9–1	—	10–0	6–4	9–1	7–1	7–1	4–6
Cincinnati	0–10	0–10	—	1–9	2–8	1–7	3–5	2–7
Hartford	8–2	4–6	9–1	—	9–1–1	4–4	9–1	4–6
Louisville	5–5	1–9	8–2	1–9–1	—	5–3–1	6–2–1	4–6
New York	2–8	1–7	7–1	4–4	3–5–1	—	3–4	1–6
Philadelphia	1–9	1–7	5–3	1–9	2–6–1	4–3	—	0–8
St. Louis	6–4	6–4	7–2	6–4	6–4	6–1	8–0	—

=== Roster ===
1876 Philadelphia Athletics
Roster
Pitchers: Lon Knight; Flip Lafferty; George Zettlein; Catchers: Doc Bushong; John Curran; Fergy Malone; John Mullen; Lou Paul; Nealy Phelps; Jim Ward	Infielders: Wes Fisler; Davy Force; Bill Fouser; Levi Meyerle; Ezra Sutton	Outfielders: John Bergh; William Coon; Dave Eggler; George Hall; Whitey Ritterson; Fred Warner	Manager: Al Wright

== Player stats ==
=== Batting ===
==== Starters by position ====
Note: Pos = Position; G = Games played; AB = At bats; H = Hits; Avg. = Batting average; HR = Home runs; RBI = Runs batted in

Pos	Player	G	AB	H	Avg.	HR	RBI
C	Fergy Malone	22	96	22	.229	0	6
1B	Ezra Sutton	54	236	70	.297	1	31
2B	Wes Fisler	59	278	80	.288	1	30
3B	Levi Meyerle	55	256	87	.340	0	34
SS	Davy Force	60	284	66	.232	0	17
OF	George Hall	60	268	98	.366	5	45
OF	Dave Eggler	39	174	52	.299	0	19
OF	William Coon	54	220	50	.227	0	22

==== Other batters ====
Note: G = Games played; AB = At bats; H = Hits; Avg. = Batting average; HR = Home runs; Runs batted in

Player	G	AB	H	Avg.	HR	RBI
Bill Fouser	21	89	12	.135	0	2
Whitey Ritterson	16	52	13	.250	0	4
Doc Bushong	5	21	1	.048	0	1
John Curran	3	12	4	.333	0	2
Lou Paul	3	12	2	.167	0	0
John Bergh	1	4	0	.000	0	0
Nealy Phelps	1	4	0	.000	0	0
Jim Ward	1	4	2	.500	0	1
John Mullen	1	3	0	.000	0	0
Fred Warner	1	3	0	.000	0	0

=== Pitching ===
==== Starting pitchers ====
Note: G = Games pitched; IP = Innings pitched; W = Wins; L = Losses; ERA = Earned run average; SO = Strikeouts

Player	G	IP	W	L	ERA	SO
Lon Knight	34	282.0	10	22	2.62	12
George Zettlein	28	234.0	4	20	3.88	10
Levi Meyerle	2	18.0	0	2	5.00	0
Flip Lafferty	1	9.0	0	1	0.00	0

==== Relief pitchers ====
Note: G = Games pitched; W = Wins; L = Losses; SV = Saves; ERA = Earned run average; SO = Strikeouts

Player	G	W	L	SV	ERA	SO
William Coon	2	0	0	0	5.14	0
