= 1871 Philadelphia Athletics season =

1871 Philadelphia Athletics
- 1871 National Association Champions
- League: National Association of Professional Base Ball Players
- Ballpark: Jefferson Street Grounds
- City: Philadelphia, Pennsylvania
- Record: 21–7 (.750)
- League place: 1st
- Managers: Dick McBride

With the debut of the first professional baseball league, the National Association of Professional Base Ball Players, the Athletic Baseball Club of Philadelphia was one of the first clubs to join.

The Athletics had been around since 1860 as an amateur club. Led by their captain and pitcher, Dick McBride, the team went 21–7 and won the first NA title during the 1871 season. Philadelphia's third baseman, Levi Meyerle, led the league with a .492 batting average.

== Regular season ==
=== Season standings ===
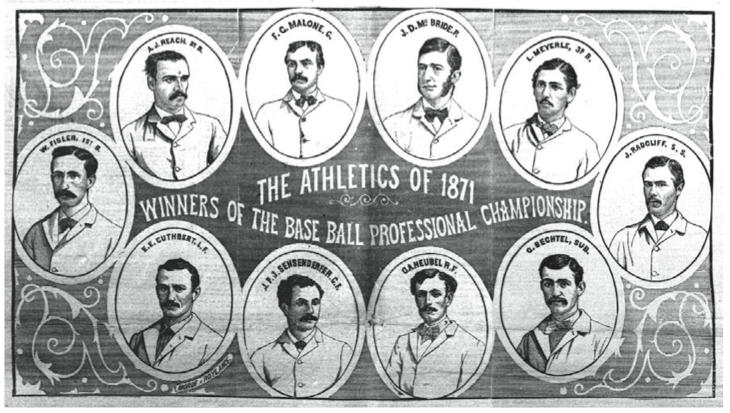
1871 Philadelphia Athletics

Pos	Team	Pld	W	L	T	RF	RA	RD	PCT	GB
1	Philadelphia Athletics (C)	28	21	7	0	376	266	+110	.750	—
2	Chicago White Stockings	28	19	9	0	302	241	+61	.679	2
3	Boston Red Stockings	31	20	10	1	401	303	+98	.661	2
4	Washington Olympics	32	15	15	2	310	303	+7	.500	7
5	New York Mutuals	33	16	17	0	302	313	−11	.485	7.5
6	Troy Haymakers	29	13	15	1	351	362	−11	.466	8
7	Fort Wayne Kekiongas	19	7	12	0	137	243	−106	.368	9.5
8	Cleveland Forest Citys	29	10	19	0	249	341	−92	.345	11.5
9	Rockford Forest Citys	25	4	21	0	231	287	−56	.160	15.5

Source: Baseball Reference
(C) Champions

=== Record vs. opponents ===
1871 National Association Records Sources:
Team	BOS	CHI	CLE	FW	NY	PHI	ROC	TRO	WSH
Boston	—	1–3	3–1	2–0	2–2	3–1	3–0	3–2	3–1–1
Chicago	3–1	—	2–1	2–0	3–1	2–3	3–0	1–1	3–2
Cleveland	1–3	1–2	—	0–3	3–2	0–3	3–1	2–2	0–3
Fort Wayne	0–2	0–2	3–0	—	1–2	0–2	1–1	1–1	1–2
New York	2–2	1–3	2–3	2–1	—	2–3	3–1	1–3	3–1
Philadelphia	1–3	3–2	3–0	2–0	3–2	—	3–0	3–0	3–0
Rockford	0–3	0–3	1–3	1–1	1–3	0–3	—	1–2	0–3
Troy	2–3	1–1	2–2	1–1	3–1	0–3	2–1	—	2–3–1
Washington	1–3–1	2–3	3–0	2–1	1–3	0–3	3–0	3–2–1	—

=== Roster ===
1871 Philadelphia Athletics
Roster
Pitchers: Dick McBride	Catchers: Fergy Malone; Infielders: Wes Fisler; Levi Meyerle; Tom Pratt; John Radcliff; Al Reach	Outfielders: George Bechtel; Nate Berkenstock; Tom Berry; Ned Cuthbert; George Heubel; Count Sensenderfer	Manager: Dick McBride

== Player stats ==
=== Batting ===
==== Starters by position ====
Note: Pos = Position; G = Games played; AB = At bats; H = Hits; Avg. = Batting average; HR = Home runs; RBI = Runs batted in

Pos	Player	G	AB	H	Avg.	HR	RBI
C	Fergy Malone	27	134	46	.343	1	33
1B	Wes Fisler	28	147	41	.279	0	16
2B	Al Reach	26	133	47	.353	0	34
SS	John Radcliff	28	145	44	.303	0	22
3B	Levi Meyerle	26	130	64	.492	4	40
OF	Count Sensenderfer	25	127	41	.323	0	23
OF	Ned Cuthbert	28	150	37	.247	3	30
OF	George Heubel	17	75	23	.307	0	13

==== Other batters ====
Note: G = Games played; AB = At bats; H = Hits; Avg. = Batting average; HR = Home runs; RBI = Runs batted in

Player	G	AB	H	Avg.	HR	RBI
George Bechtel	20	94	33	.351	1	21
Tom Pratt	1	6	2	.333	0	1
Nate Berkenstock	1	4	0	.000	0	0
Tom Berry	1	4	1	.250	0	0

=== Pitching ===
==== Starting pitchers ====
Note: G = Games pitched; IP = Innings pitched; W = Wins; L = Losses; ERA = Earned run average; SO = Strikeouts

Player	G	IP	W	L	ERA	SO
Dick McBride	25	222.0	18	5	4.58	15
George Bechtel	3	26.0	1	2	7.96	1

==== Relief pitchers ====
Note: G = Games pitched; IP = Innings pitched; W = Wins; L = Losses; ERA = Earned run average; SO = Strikeouts

Player	G	IP	W	L	ERA	SO
Levi Meyerle	1	1.0	0	0	9.00	0

Preceded by First Season	National Association of Professional Base Ball Players Championship Season; 1871	Succeeded by Boston Red Stockings; 1872
