= 1871 Troy Haymakers season =

1871 Troy Haymakers
- League: National Association of Professional Base Ball Players
- Ballpark: Haymakers' Grounds
- City: Troy, New York
- Record: 13–15–1 (.466)
- League place: 6th
- Managers: Lip Pike, Bill Craver

The Troy Haymakers played their first season in 1871 as a charter member of the National Association of Professional Base Ball Players. They finished sixth in the league with a record of 13–15–1.

== Regular season ==
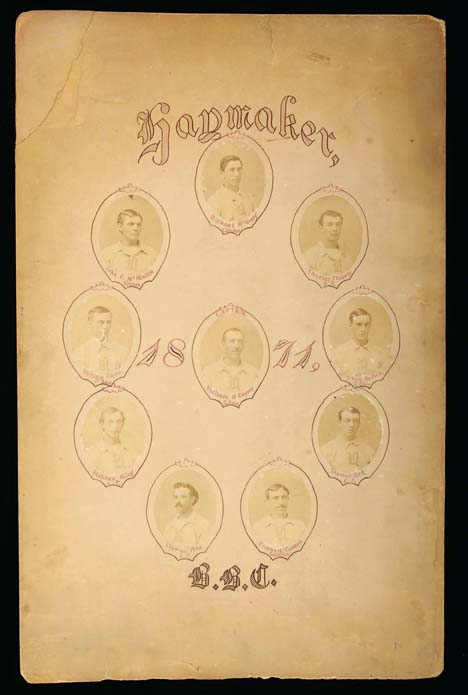
Picture of the 1871 Troy Haymakers

=== Season standings ===
Pos	Team	Pld	W	L	T	RF	RA	RD	PCT	GB
1	Philadelphia Athletics (C)	28	21	7	0	376	266	+110	.750	—
2	Chicago White Stockings	28	19	9	0	302	241	+61	.679	2
3	Boston Red Stockings	31	20	10	1	401	303	+98	.661	2
4	Washington Olympics	32	15	15	2	310	303	+7	.500	7
5	New York Mutuals	33	16	17	0	302	313	−11	.485	7.5
6	Troy Haymakers	29	13	15	1	351	362	−11	.466	8
7	Fort Wayne Kekiongas	19	7	12	0	137	243	−106	.368	9.5
8	Cleveland Forest Citys	29	10	19	0	249	341	−92	.345	11.5
9	Rockford Forest Citys	25	4	21	0	231	287	−56	.160	15.5

Source: Baseball Reference
(C) Champions

=== Record vs. opponents ===
1871 National Association Records Sources:
Team	BOS	CHI	CLE	FW	NY	PHI	ROC	TRO	WSH
Boston	—	1–3	3–1	2–0	2–2	3–1	3–0	3–2	3–1–1
Chicago	3–1	—	2–1	2–0	3–1	2–3	3–0	1–1	3–2
Cleveland	1–3	1–2	—	0–3	3–2	0–3	3–1	2–2	0–3
Fort Wayne	0–2	0–2	3–0	—	1–2	0–2	1–1	1–1	1–2
New York	2–2	1–3	2–3	2–1	—	2–3	3–1	1–3	3–1
Philadelphia	1–3	3–2	3–0	2–0	3–2	—	3–0	3–0	3–0
Rockford	0–3	0–3	1–3	1–1	1–3	0–3	—	1–2	0–3
Troy	2–3	1–1	2–2	1–1	3–1	0–3	2–1	—	2–3–1
Washington	1–3–1	2–3	3–0	2–1	1–3	0–3	3–0	3–2–1	—

=== Roster ===
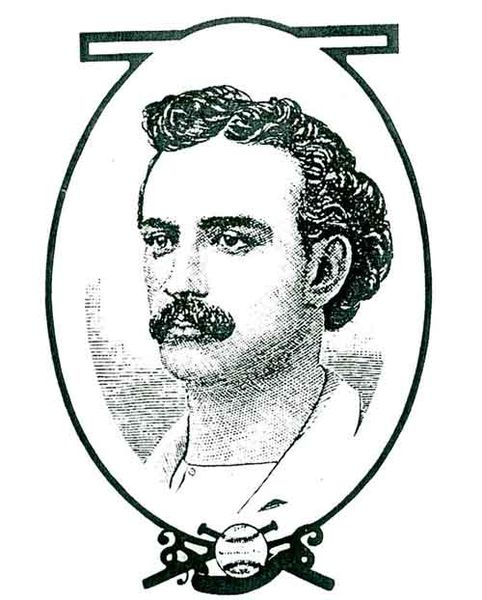
Manager Lip Pike

1871 Troy Haymakers
Roster
Pitchers: John McMullin	Catchers: Mike McGeary; Infielders: Frank Abercrombie; Edward Beavens; Steve Bellán; Ned Connor; Bill Craver; Dickie Flowers; Clipper Flynn	Outfielders: Steve King; Lip Pike; Tom York	Manager: Bill Craver; Lip Pike

== Player stats ==
=== Batting ===
==== Starters by position ====
Note: Pos = Position; G = Games played; AB = At bats; H = Hits; Avg. = Batting average; HR = Home runs; RBI = Runs batted in

Pos	Player	G	AB	H	Avg.	HR	RBI
C	Mike McGeary	29	148	39	.264	0	12
1B	Clipper Flynn	29	142	48	.338	0	27
2B	Bill Craver	27	118	38	.322	0	26
SS	Dickie Flowers	21	105	33	.314	0	18
3B	Steve Bellán	29	128	32	.250	0	23
OF	Tom York	29	145	37	.255	2	23
OF	Lip Pike	28	130	49	.377	4	39
OF	Steve King	29	144	57	.396	0	34

==== Other batters ====
Note: G = Games played; AB = At bats; H = Hits; Avg. = Batting average; HR = Home runs; RBI = Runs batted in

Player	G	AB	H	Avg.	HR	RBI
Ned Connor	7	33	7	.212	0	2
Edward Beavens	3	15	6	.400	0	5
Frank Abercrombie	1	4	0	.000	0	0

=== Pitching ===
==== Starting pitchers ====
Note: G = Games pitched; IP = Innings pitched; W = Wins; L = Losses; ERA = Earned run average; SO = Strikeouts

Player	G	IP	W	L	ERA	SO
John McMullin	29	249.0	12	15	5.53	12

==== Relief pitchers ====
Note: G = Games pitched; IP = Innings pitched; W = Wins; L = Losses; ERA = Earned run average; SO = Strikeouts

Player	G	IP	W	L	ERA	SO
Dickie Flowers	1	1.0	0	0	0.00	0
