= Davy Force =

American baseball player (1849–1918)

- Infielder
- Born: July 27, 1849; New York City, New York, U.S.
- Died: June 21, 1918 (aged 68); Englewood, New Jersey, U.S.
- Batted: Right Threw: Right

Major-league debut
- May 5, 1871, for the Washington Olympics

Last major-league appearance
- August 20, 1886, for the Washington Nationals

Major-league statistics
- Batting average: .249
- Hits: 1,060
- Runs: 653
- Stats at Baseball Reference

Teams
- National Association of Base Ball Players Washington Olympics (1867–1870) League Player Washington Olympics (1871) Troy Haymakers (1872) Baltimore Canaries (1872–1873) Chicago White Stockings (1874) Philadelphia Athletics (1875–1876) New York Mutuals (1876) St. Louis Brown Stockings (1877) Buffalo Bisons (1879–1885) Washington Nationals (1886)

David W. Force (July 27, 1849 – June 21, 1918) was an American professional baseball shortstop. From 1871 through 1886, he played in the National Association with the Washington Olympics (1871), Troy Haymakers (1872), Baltimore Canaries (1872-1873), Chicago White Stockings (1874) and Philadelphia Athletics (1875), and in the National League for the Philadelphia Athletics (1876), New York Mutuals (1876), St. Louis Brown Stockings (1877), Buffalo Bisons (1879–1885) and Washington Nationals (1886). Force batted and threw right-handed.

The light-hitting but slick-fielding Force is best known for setting off a National Association contract dispute between two teams. The ensuing rulings prompted William Hulbert to begin organizing the National League.

== Biography ==
Force was born on July 27, 1849, in New York City. He played for the semiprofessional New York Mutuals before signing with the Washington Olympics of the National Association. Force played in 15 major-league seasons, and he changed teams nearly every year for the first half of his career. He was known as a "revolver", the term for players who jumped from organization to organization.

Despite standing out for his lack of size at 5'4" and 130 pounds, he drew some early comparisons to Honus Wagner. He was described as having the body of a large man, only with short and bowed legs. He had modest hitting ability, but he was known as one of the best two infielders in the NL next to Harry Wright.

Baseball author Bill James describes a signing involving Force as one of the factors that prompted the establishment of the National League. After the 1874 season, Force signed with both his 1874 team, the Chicago White Stockings of the National Association, and the Philadelphia Athletics of the same league. It was relatively common that players signed two contracts; a league judiciary committee awarded Force to the White Stockings because he had signed that contract first. However, when a new president from Philadelphia took over the league, he ruled that Force belonged to the Athletics. The reversal contributed to Chicago executive William Hulbert's motivation to organize a new league.

On 22 April 1876, at a Boston Red Caps at Philadelphia Athletics game, Force became the first fielder in National League history to complete an assist, fielding a ground ball from George Wright and throwing to first baseman Wes Fisler to complete the putout.

Force posted a .249 career batting average with 653 runs and 373 RBI in 1029 games played. Despite mediocre career numbers, in 1876 Force became the first major-league player to collect six hits in a game.

Force worked for Otis Elevator Company after his retirement from baseball. His name resurfaced in 1897 when he was briefly wanted for murder in a case of mistaken identity. He died on June 21, 1918, in Englewood, New Jersey, at the age of 68. He was buried there in Brookside Cemetery.

== See also ==
- List of Major League Baseball single-game hits leaders
