= George Wright (shortstop) =

American baseball player, golfer, and cricketer (1847–1937)

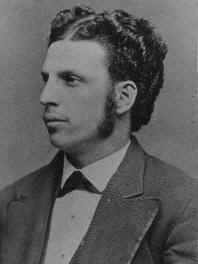
- 1872 portrait of Wright
- Shortstop
- Born: January 28, 1847; Yonkers, New York, U.S.
- Died: August 21, 1937 (aged 90); Boston, Massachusetts, U.S.
- Batted: Right Threw: Right

Major league debut
- May 5, 1871, for the Boston Red Stockings

Last major league appearance
- October 2, 1882, for the Providence Grays

Major league statistics
- Batting average: .301
- Home runs: 11
- Runs batted in: 326
- Managerial record: 59–25–1
- Winning %: .702
- Stats at Baseball Reference

Teams
- As player: Cincinnati Red Stockings (1869–1870); Boston Red Stockings (1871–1875); Boston Red Caps (1876–1878, 1880–1881); Providence Grays (1879, 1882); As manager: Providence Grays (1879)

Career highlights and awards
- 4× NA pennant (1872–1875); 3× NL pennant (1877–1879); Cincinnati Reds Hall of Fame

Member of the National

Baseball Hall of Fame
- Induction: 1937
- Election method: Centennial Commission
- Cricket career
Cricket information
- Bowling: Roundarm fast
International information
- National side: United States
Career statistics
Competition	First-class
Matches	2
Runs scored	43
Batting average	14.33
100s/50s	0/0
Top score	31
Balls bowled	79
Wickets	0
Bowling average	–
5 wickets in innings	–
10 wickets in match	–
Best bowling	–
Catches/stumpings	1/–
- Source: Cricinfo, 04 August 2026

George Wright (January 28, 1847 – August 21, 1937) was an American amateur and professional baseball shortstop. He played for the 1869 Cincinnati Red Stockings, the first fully professional team, when he was the game's best player. He then played for the Boston Red Stockings, helping the team win six league championships from 1871 to 1878. His older brother Harry Wright managed both Red Stockings teams and made George his cornerstone. After arriving in Boston, he also entered the sporting goods business. There he continued in the industry, assisting in the development of golf. George was elected to the Baseball Hall of Fame in 1937. At the age of 90, George Wright died on August 21st, 1937 of complications from a stroke.

== Early life ==
Born in Yonkers, New York on January 28, 1847, George Wright was raised as a cricket "club pro", assisting his father Samuel Wright as his brother Harry had done. Before George's birth, Samuel Wright's St George's Cricket Club moved from Manhattan across the Hudson River to Elysian Fields, Hoboken, New Jersey, where many New York and New Jersey baseball clubs played in the 1850s. Both boys learned baseball, too, but George grew up with the sport and was barely in his teens when the American Civil War curtailed its boom; Harry was already 22 when the baseball fraternity convened for the first time, and 30 when the war ended. George's younger brother Sam Wright also played baseball professionally, with brief appearances in the major leagues.

== Amateur baseball ==
At some times during the war, both George and Harry Wright played for the venerable Gothams, the second-oldest baseball team after the Knickerbockers. George moved from the Gotham juniors to the senior team when he was 15. In 1864, George was their regular catcher at the age of 17.

Baseball's recovery from the American Civil War was far advanced in greater New York City (always untouched by the military conflict), as the leading clubs played more than 20 National Association of Base Ball Players (NABBP) matches, the Gothams 11. George played eight and led the team both in runs, scoring 2.4 times per game, and "hands lost", put out only 2.4 times per game, average being three per player in a 9-inning game. In seven matches infielder Harry was fourth in scoring at 2.0 and second behind George in hands lost at 2.6 (Wright 2000: 91).

For the 1865 season, George was hired by the Philadelphia Cricket Club; that summer he played in five matches for the Olympic Ball Club of that city. The Olympic club was the devoted to games in the baseball genus, established in 1833. At the December annual meeting, the first in peacetime, NAABP membership tripled, including isolated clubs from as far as Fort Leavenworth, Kansas and Chattanooga, Tennessee. Wright returned to the Gothams for baseball; he was 19 and nearing his athletic peak. At the same time, Harry Wright moved to Cincinnati for a job at the Union Cricket Club.

Early in the summer of 1866, Wright moved from catcher for Gotham, which played eight NABBP matches that year, to shortstop for Union, which played 28, the leading number. The Union of Morrisania, located in what is now the Bronx, were another charter member of the first Association, but one that moved toward professionalism in the postwar years, as the Gothams did not. In 1867, he joined the Nationals of Washington, D.C., the oldest club in that city, whose approach to professionalism was arranging government jobs, mainly with the Treasury. He played second base, shortstop, and pitcher in 29 of the 30 matches fully on record and in those matches led the team both in scoring and hands lost. Next year he returned to the Unions for the association's last officially all-amateur season and moved permanently to the shortstop position. In 1868, Wright won the Clipper Medal for being the best shortstop in baseball.

== Cincinnati Red Stockings ==
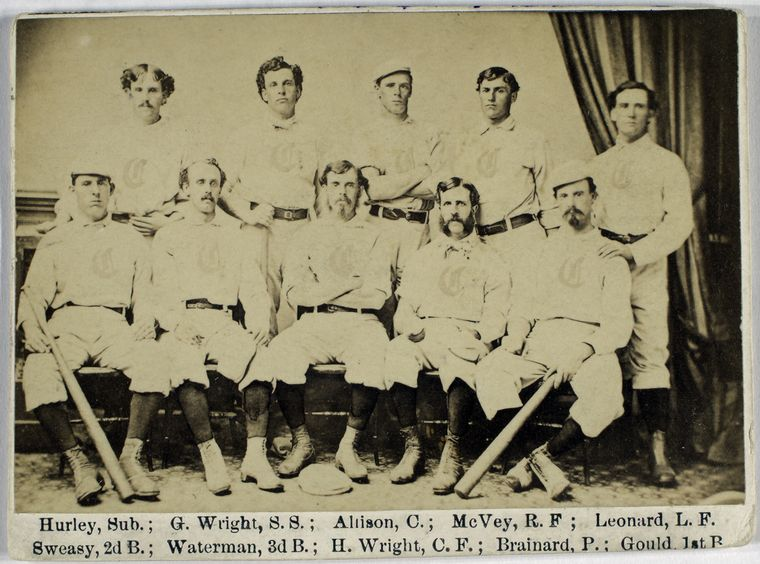
The 1869 Cincinnati Red Stockings. Wright is second from left in the back row.

Meanwhile, George's brother Harry had acquired baseball duties and had organized for Cincinnati the strongest team in the West, led in 1868 by a handful of players from the East — presumably compensated somehow by club members if not by the club. When the NABBP permitted professionalism for 1869, Harry augmented himself and four incumbents with five new men including his brother George, who was highest paid at $1400 for nine months. George remained a cornerstone of Harry's teams for 10 seasons.

Cincinnati toured the country undefeated in 1869, as George batted .633 with 49 home runs in 57 games. It may have been the strongest team in 1870, but the club dropped professional baseball after the second season.

== Major league baseball ==
Harry Wright was hired to organize a new team in Boston, where he signed three teammates including George for 1871. The new Red Stockings team just missed winning the first National Association pennant. George suffered a broken leg and missed half the season; one more win would have been decisive in Boston's favor. With some personnel changes, the Boston Red Stockings won the other four NA pennants, dominating so severely in 1875 that they helped provoke a new league. Wright holds the NA career record for the most triples (41), and he led the NA in triples with 15 in 1874.

On April 22, 1876, Wright became the first batter in National League history. In the first play in National League history, Wright grounded out to shortstop Davy Force, who threw to the first baseman Wes Fisler to complete the putout. Boston trailed badly in the first NL season after the defection of its Big Four western players to Chicago, but rebounded to win again both 1877 and 1878. George Wright had played an even decade for Harry's teams. Another 1869 hire, Andy Leonard, was present for all but the 1871 second-place finish.

The Providence Grays, new in the NL for 1878, hired George to lead the team in 1879. He did as well as possible, wrestling the championship for himself from older brother Harry; for Providence and Rhode Island from older and regionally dominant Boston and Massachusetts. However, Wright & Ditson Sporting Goods was growing, so George returned to Boston for business reasons. He remains the only man to win the pennant in his lone season as manager. Meanwhile, the National League introduced the reserve list system, and Providence listed George, so he was not free to sign with Boston. Until the 1879–80 off-season, every professional baseball player was a "free agent" for every season. During the next two seasons he played only a few games. When Boston changed managers for 1882, Harry signed to lead Providence and inherited the right to sign his brother. George played another season full-time, retiring after the 1882 season with a .301 batting average in the major leagues from 1871.

After Ditson died in 1891, Spalding purchased Wright & Ditson Co in Feb 1892. The name Wright & Ditson Co continued to be used several years after the purchase.

== Cricket ==
In 1882, Wright took up cricket seriously again with the Longwood Cricket Club of Boston where he dominated local cricket sides with Isaac Chambers, the Longwood cricket pro and greenskeeper, holding up the other bowling end. In 1891, Wright captained the Longwood Cricket Club against Lord Hawke's visiting English side. Wright's side surprised the visiting English first-class players with accurate bowling which kept the tourists in check. In 1892, Wright donated cricket gear to British Guianese (Guyana) cricket players, thereby starting a century-old tradition of West Indian cricket in New England.

== Golf ==
In 1886, Wright obtained what was said to be the first set of golf clubs and balls in the United States and had them on display in the Wright & Ditson sporting goods shop in Boston where a visitor from Scotland saw them and explained the game. In December 1890, Wright and three friends obtained a permit and chopped nine holes in the frozen ground of Boston's Franklin Park, playing two rounds. (Six years later, a public golf course was laid out in Franklin Park. The course, now known as the William J. Devine Golf Course, is the second oldest public golf course in the United States.)

Wright & Ditson became a major seller of golf clubs; early U.S. Open champion Francis Ouimet worked at the store while pursuing his amateur career. Boston's second municipal course, designed by Donald Ross and built by the MDC with WPA labor, was named George Wright Golf Course in his honor.

== Personal life ==
George was the father of tennis great Beals Wright, a U.S. Championship winner and Olympic gold medalist, and Irving Wright, U.S. Championship mixed doubles champion.

== Baseball legacy ==
George Wright served on the 1906–1907 Mills Commission that—despite a complete lack of historical evidence—determined that Cooperstown, New York was the birthplace of baseball. National League president Abraham G. Mills and secretary Sullivan probably did the work, with the others lending gravity and celebrity. (The commission's determination has never been taken seriously by baseball historians and scholars.)

Wright accompanied the United States contingent to the 1912 Summer Olympics in Stockholm, Sweden where demonstrations of baseball, involving American track and field athletes and a team of Swedish players, were held. Wright umpired one of the games and provided instruction in the game for the Swedish players. Jim Thorpe, winner of the pentathlon and decathlon at that year's Olympics and a future major league baseball player, was one of the American players participating in the baseball exhibitions.

Wright was consulted regarding the baseball centennial celebrations of 1939, including the establishment of the National Baseball Hall of Fame and Museum in Cooperstown. Soon after his own election to the Hall of Fame in 1937, he died in Boston of a stroke at the age of 90. He is buried in Holyhood Cemetery, in Brookline, Massachusetts.

== See also ==
- List of Major League Baseball player-managers

Records
Preceded by Harry Schafer	Oldest recognized verified living baseball player February 28, 1935 – August 21, 1937	Succeeded by John McKelvey
