= Harry Berthrong =

American baseball player (1844–1928)

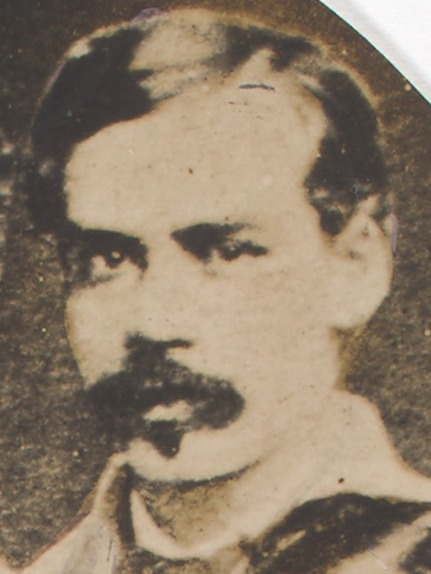
- Outfielder
- Born: January 1, 1844; Mumford, New York, U.S.
- Died: April 28, 1928 (aged 84); Chelsea, Massachusetts, U.S.
- Batted: Unknown Threw: Right

Major-league debut
- May 5, 1871, for the Washington Olympics

Last major-league appearance
- July 4, 1871, for the Washington Olympics

Major-league statistics
- Batting average: .233
- Home runs: 0
- Runs batted in: 8
- Stats at Baseball Reference

Teams
- National Association of Base Ball Players Washington Nationals (1865–1868) Washington Olympics (1870) National Association of Professional BBP Washington Olympics (1871)

Henry Washburn Berthrong (January 1, 1844 – April 28, 1928) was an American professional baseball player and portrait painter. Berthrong was a veteran of the Civil War and his chief fame was derived from his paintings of candidates in U.S. presidential elections. He played major-league baseball with the Washington Olympics in 1871. He hit .233 in 73 at-bats.

In the Civil War he served with the 140th New York Volunteers, Co. E. and the 5th Corps, Army of the Potomac, before he was discharged on July 13, 1865.

During the Civil War, which had interrupted his art studies, he painted portraits of notable generals including Grant, Sherman, and Sheridan. He painted Grant again in 1885 when he was former President Grant, and in the 1890s he painted hundreds of huge portraits for William McKinley's successful presidential campaigns. An 1892 photograph of Berthrong with his outsized portrait of President Benjamin Harrison is often reproduced. It was used, for example, as an illustration in a March 2018 article in New York.

He then served with the Olympics in 1871 and afterwards joined the customs service.

Records
Preceded by Al Reach	Oldest recognized verified living baseball player January 14, 1928 – April 24, 1928	Succeeded by Phonney Martin
