= Sam Wright (baseball) =

American baseball player (1848–1928)

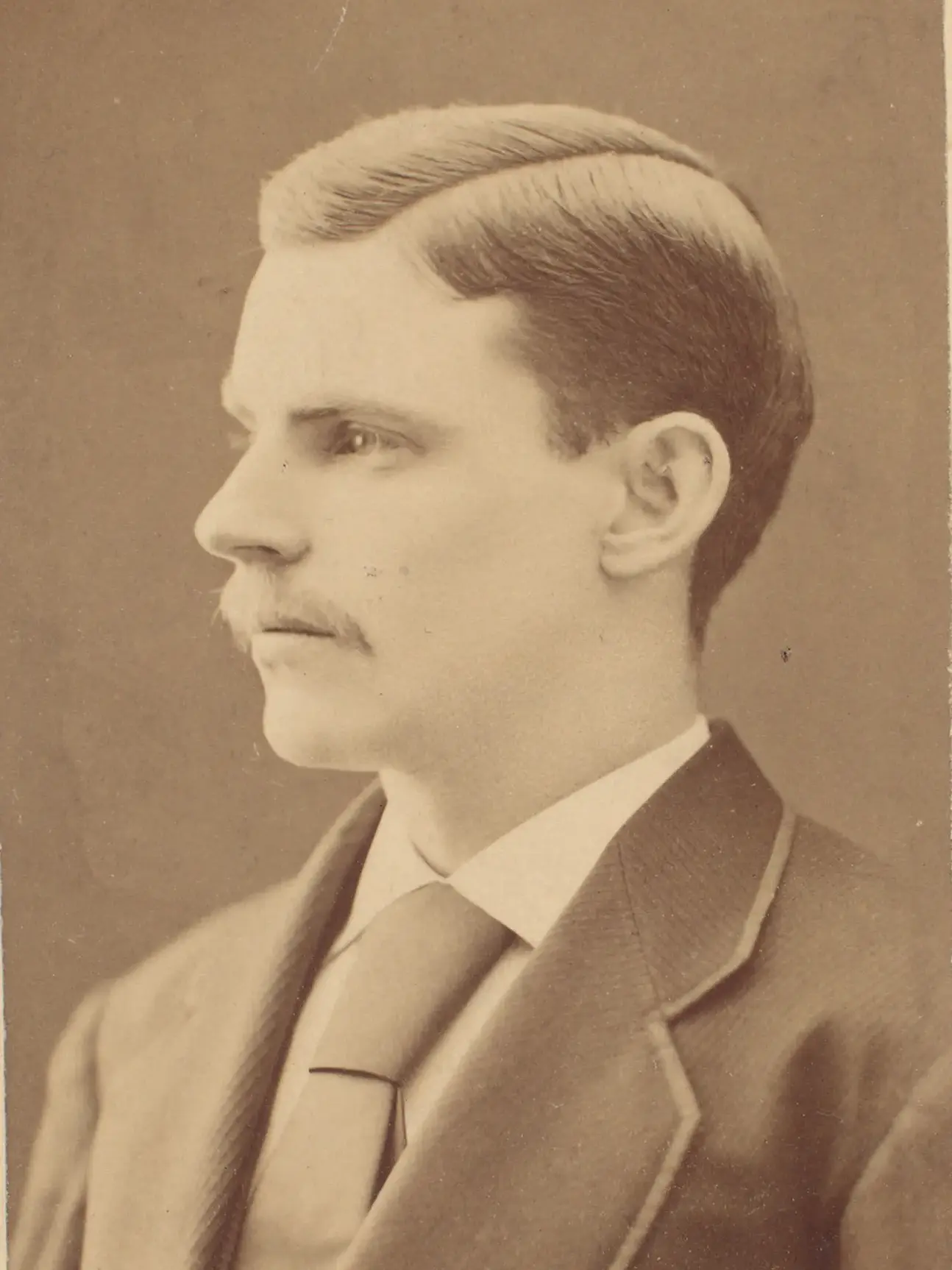
- Shortstop
- Born: November 25, 1848; New York City, U.S.
- Died: May 6, 1928 (aged 79); Boston, Massachusetts, U.S.
- Batted: Right Threw: Right

MLB debut
- April 19, 1875, for the New Haven Elm Citys

Last MLB appearance
- September 23, 1881, for the Boston Red Caps

MLB statistics
- Batting average: .168
- Runs scored: 10
- Runs batted in: 5
- Stats at Baseball Reference

Teams
- New Haven Elm Citys (1875); Boston Red Caps (1876); Cincinnati Stars (1880); Boston Red Caps (1881)

Samuel Wright Jr. (November 25, 1848 – May 6, 1928) was an American professional baseball player. He played in Major League Baseball for a total of four seasons for the New Haven Elm Citys (1875), Boston Red Caps (1876, 1881), and Cincinnati Stars (1880).

In 45 games played, all as a shortstop, he batted .168, had 29 hits, four doubles, five RBIs, scored 10 runs, and one base on balls in 173 at bats. Two of his brothers also played in the majors: Baseball Hall of Famers Harry Wright and George Wright.

Wright was born in New York City to Samuel Wright Sr., a famous cricketer, and Sam's second wife, Ann Tone. He died at the age of 79 in Boston, Massachusetts. He is interred at St. Patrick Cemetery in Stoneham, Massachusetts.
