= St George's Cricket Club =

Prominent early American cricket club

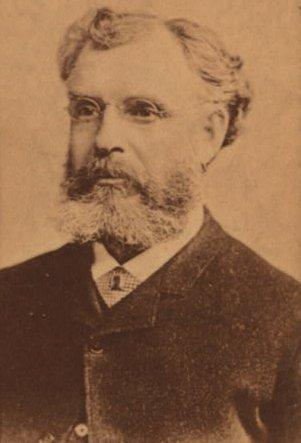
Harry Wright was a successful bowler for St George's Club before he moved to the Cincinnati Red Stockings

The St George's Cricket Club, also referred to as the St George Cricket Club, was the leading cricket club in the United States from the 1840s to the 1870s. Founded in 1839, with assistance from prominent members of the St George's Society of New York, it was originally located in Manhattan, New York, and later moved to Hoboken, New Jersey. Nicknamed the "Dragon Slayers", in 1844 the club hosted the first international cricket match, between teams representing Canada and the United States. It disbanded in 1898.

== History ==
The St George's Cricket Club (SGCC) was founded in Manhattan, New York. As recalled in 1894 by one of the SGCC's early players, Robert Waller, the club's name was not adopted until St George's Day (April 23) 1840, although it had been formed the previous year. (Note: The New York Herald noted that 1879 was the club's 40th season, having stated previously that it was established in 1839.) However, according to Henry Chadwick, its first match was played (as "New York" (Note: In 1839, the club was referred to in the press as the "New York Cricket Club", but this would have been a natural description as there were no other cricket clubs in the city at the time. The index to The Albion newspaper for 1840 refers to New York Cricket Club, but the article concerned relates only to St George's.) against "Long Island") on October 22–23, 1838. (Note: An earlier account of this match, based on details reportedly preserved by one of the New York team's players, G. Stead, appeared in the New York Clipper in 1858.) In July 1840, an advert was placed in the Spirit of the Times, stating that the SGCC was "open to play a friendly Match between any Club, or any eleven players in the United States, for a sum not less than $100, or over $500" (a "Match" was to consist of one game in New York, and another at any location between Philadelphia and Troy). On September 24–25, 1844, it hosted the first international cricket match, between Canada and the United States.

Most of its playing members were British-born and excluded Americans from participating in their "English game". In 1843, this led to the formation of the New York Cricket Club, to which Edwin Augustus Stevens granted land for a ground in Hoboken. (Note: Preston, Paul (December 12, 1868). "Reminiscences of a Man About Town: No. 34 – The New York Cricket Club". New York Clipper. Vol. 16, no. 36. p. 284 – via Illinois Digital Newspaper Collections. (Paul Preston was a pseudonym of Thomas Picton).) The local resentment of this English social exclusivity amongst New York ball players may have been the impetus for cricket to be designated as an "English" game in the US, though it had been played for over a century at the time.

The SGCC club traveled to Canada on several occasions in the 1850s, encouraging a touring tradition for American sports which culminated in George Parr's All-England XI visiting New York, Philadelphia, and Montreal in 1859. This was the first occasion that a professional team of players in any sport had played in the United States. The All England Team of professionals played a US XXII team that included five SGCC players.

In 1866, it was reported that the SGCC had 200–300 members and was in a "flourishing condition", being able to field "three excellent elevens". It continued its dominant New York cricket organizational role until 1876, when the founding of the New York Metropolitan league and the Staten Island Cricket and Baseball Club at Walker Park ushered in a new era of league cricket in New York. Its first ground was located in Midtown Manhattan off of Bloomingdale Road (now Broadway) between 30th and 31st Street. (Note: Preston, Paul (October 17, 1868). "Reminiscences of a Man About Town: No. 26 – Among the Cricketers". New York Clipper. Vol. 16, no. 28. p. 220 – via Illinois Digital Newspaper Collections. (Paul Preston was a pseudonym of Thomas Picton).) The ground was located behind the Casper Samler farmstead, which was later replaced by the Gilsey Hotel. By November 1845, the SGCC was looking for another venue as this site had been "cut through" by the opening of Fifth Avenue. On May 4, 1846, it was reported that the club had purchased a new ground "near the Red House on the Harlem Road", which it was in the process of "levelling and filling". The planned opening on St George's Day had already been postponed due to the "unfit state" of the ground, but on May 18 it was advertised that a match would take place two days later. Known colloquially and referred to in the press as the "Red House" ground, (Note: In several adverts, the name "Island House" is used instead.) the club's new home was situated to the east of Third Avenue, where 105th and 106th streets now cross First Avenue (as laid out in the Commissioners' Plan of 1811). Red House hosted domestic competitions between teams from New York and Philadelphia, as well as international matches with Canadian teams, including a match between the United States and Canada in 1853.

In 1854, the SGCC moved across the Hudson River to New Jersey, where beginning on May 10, they were invited to play their matches on the ground of the New York Cricket Club. After the Civil War, St George's was slated to get a ground in Central Park before moving to Hudson City. St George's opponents included the Staten Island Cricket and Baseball Club, the Philadelphia Cricket Club, and the Toronto Cricket Club. George Wright includes a picture of St George's cricket grounds in his biography.

George Wright's older brother Harry also played for St George's team. The Wrights' father, Samuel, was the professional groundskeeper for the team and is depicted, along with his son Harry, in a famous daguerreotype holding a cricket bat while Harry holds a baseball bat.

The SGCC did not send a representative to the first national cricket convention, held in Philadelphia in 1878, when the Cricketers' Association of the United States was established. However, it did participate the next year, when a club member was elected as one of the organisation's two vice-presidents.

=== Tennis and the decline of cricket ===
In May 1881, the SGCC became one of the founding members of the United States Lawn Tennis Association (USLTA), with club treasurer Berkley Mostyn being elected to the committee. The following year, the ground was expanded to provide a number of extra courts, and by 1884 there were 20 in total. St George's approached the USLTA with the idea of holding the country's first regional tennis tournament, and duly hosted the inaugural Middle States Tennis Championship on June 10–12, 1885. A clay court was amongst several further courts added in 1887.

The popularity of tennis increased rapidly during 1880s, and St George's was not the only club to experience a corresponding decline in the importance of cricket to its members. Indeed, by 1888, the SGCC had become "so absorbed" in the new sport that the press considered the playing of a cricket match to be a noteworthy event. Whilst a revival of interest in the game was reported that year, a writer in The Cosmopolitan magazine noted in 1891 that it had been had supplanted by tennis, commenting that "unless its membership be frequently recruited by newly arriving Englishmen, the probability is that cricket will survive only in the club’s title". This was a prophetic observation, as despite efforts to prolong its existence, the cricket team disbanded around the beginning of June 1898. The club continued to provide tennis facilities, and following an overhaul of the ground in 1902 by Richard Stevens, the New York Times stated that its grass courts were "without question [...] the finest in the country".
