= Harry Wright =

Baseball player, manager, and developer (1835–1895)

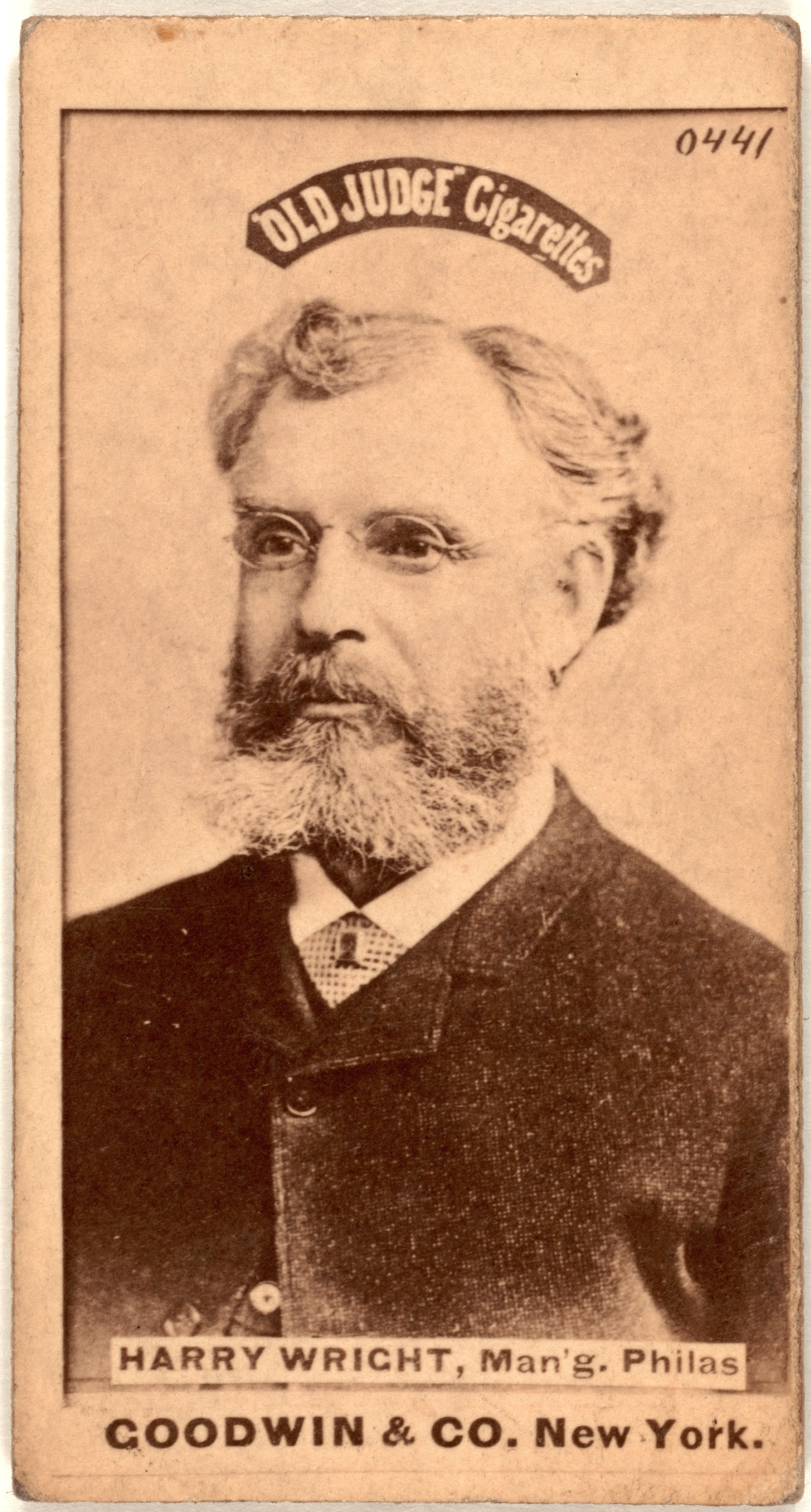
- Center fielder / Pitcher / Manager
- Born: January 10, 1835; Sheffield, England
- Died: October 3, 1895 (aged 60); Atlantic City, New Jersey, U.S.
- Batted: Right Threw: Right

Major league debut
- May 5, 1871, for the Boston Red Stockings

Last major league appearance
- September 29, 1877, for the Boston Red Caps

Major league statistics
- Batting average: .276
- Home runs: 4
- Runs batted in: 113
- Managerial record: 1,225–885–35
- Winning %: .581
- Stats at Baseball Reference
- Managerial record at Baseball Reference

Teams
- National Association of Base Ball Players: New York Knickerbockers (1858–1862); Gotham of New York (1863–1865); Cincinnati Red Stockings (1866–1870); League player: Boston Red Stockings (1871–1875); Boston Red Caps (1876–1877); League manager: Boston Red Stockings (1871–1875); Boston Red Caps (1876–1881); Providence Grays (1882–1883); Philadelphia Quakers/Phillies (1884–1893)

Career highlights and awards
- As player: 4× NA pennant (1872–1875); NL pennant (1877); 4× NA saves leader (1871–1874); As manager: 4× NA pennant (1872–1875); 2× NL pennant (1877–1878); Braves Hall of Fame

Member of the National

Baseball Hall of Fame
- Induction: 1953
- Vote: Veterans Committee

William Henry "Harry" Wright (January 10, 1835 – October 3, 1895) was an American professional baseball center fielder, pitcher, manager, and developer. He assembled, managed, and played for baseball's first fully professional team, the 1869 Cincinnati Red Stockings. He is credited with introducing innovations such as backing up infield plays from the outfield and shifting defensive alignments based on hitters' tendencies. For his contributions as a manager and developer of the game, he was inducted into the Baseball Hall of Fame in 1953 by the Veterans Committee.

Wright was the first to make baseball into a business by paying his players up to seven times the pay of the average working man. He is the oldest former professional player in the Hall: a few other inductees were born before him, but none of them played professionally. His younger brother George Wright is also in the Hall.

== Early life ==
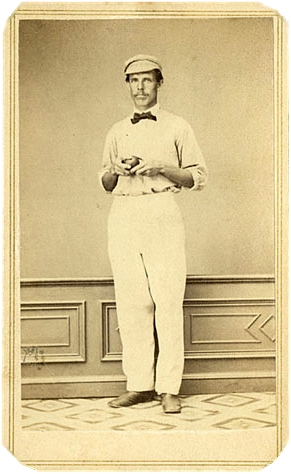
Wright in 1863

Born in Sheffield, England, he was the eldest of five children of professional cricketer Samuel Wright and his wife, Annie Tone Wright. His family emigrated to the U.S. when he was nearly three years old, and his father found work as a bowler, coach, and groundskeeper at the St George's Cricket Club in New York. Harry dropped out of school at age 14 to work for a jewelry manufacturer, and worked at Tiffany & Co. for several years.

Both Harry and George, 12 years younger, assisted their father, effectively apprenticing as cricket "club pros". Harry played against the first English cricket team to tour overseas in 1859.

Both brothers played baseball for some of the leading clubs during the amateur era of the National Association of Base Ball Players (NABBP). Harry was already 22 when the baseball fraternity convened for the first time in 1857, at which time he joined the Knickerbocker Base Ball Club. He did not play in a game with the Knickerbockers until July 8, 1858, playing the outfield against Excelsior of Brooklyn. The Knickerbockers lost the game, 31–13.

In 1863, the Knickerbocker club all but withdrew from official competition, and Wright joined Gotham of New York, primarily playing shortstop. Here, he joined his brother George, who had become a member of the team the previous year. During the winter of 1864/65, the Wrights played the curious game of "ice base ball".

== Cincinnati ==
Wright left New York on March 8, 1865, bound for Cincinnati, where he had been hired on salary at the Union Cricket Club. When baseball boomed less than a year later in 1866, the first full peacetime season, he became, in effect, club pro at the Cincinnati Base Ball Club, although he is commonly called simply a baseball "manager" from that time. By now, Wright was 31, probably past his athletic prime.

Cincinnati fielded a strong regional club in 1867. With Wright working as the regular pitcher, and still a superior player at that level, the team won 16 matches and lost only to the Nationals of Washington, D.C., on their historic tour. For 1868 he added four players from the East and one from the crosstown Buckeye club, a vanquished rival. The easterners, at least, must have been compensated by club members if not by the club.

When the NABBP permitted professionalism for 1869, Harry augmented his 1868 imports (retaining four of five) with five new men, including three more originally from the East. No one but Harry Wright himself remained from 1867; one local man and one other westerner joined seven easterners on the famous First Nine. The most important of the new men was brother George, probably the best player in the game for a few years, the highest paid man in Cincinnati at $1400 for nine months. George at shortstop remained a cornerstone of Harry's teams for ten seasons.

The Red Stockings toured the continent undefeated in 1869 and may have been the strongest team in 1870, but the club dropped professional baseball after the second season, its fourth in the game. As it turned out, the Association also passed from the scene.

=== Manager ===
During this early era, the rules of the sport for many years prohibited substitution during games except by mutual agreement with opponents, and the role of a team manager was not as specifically geared toward game strategy as in the modern era. Instead, managers of the period combined the role of a field manager with that of a modern general manager in that they were primarily responsible for signing talented players and forming a versatile roster, as well as establishing a team approach through practice and game fundamentals.

== Boston ==
=== The National Association years ===
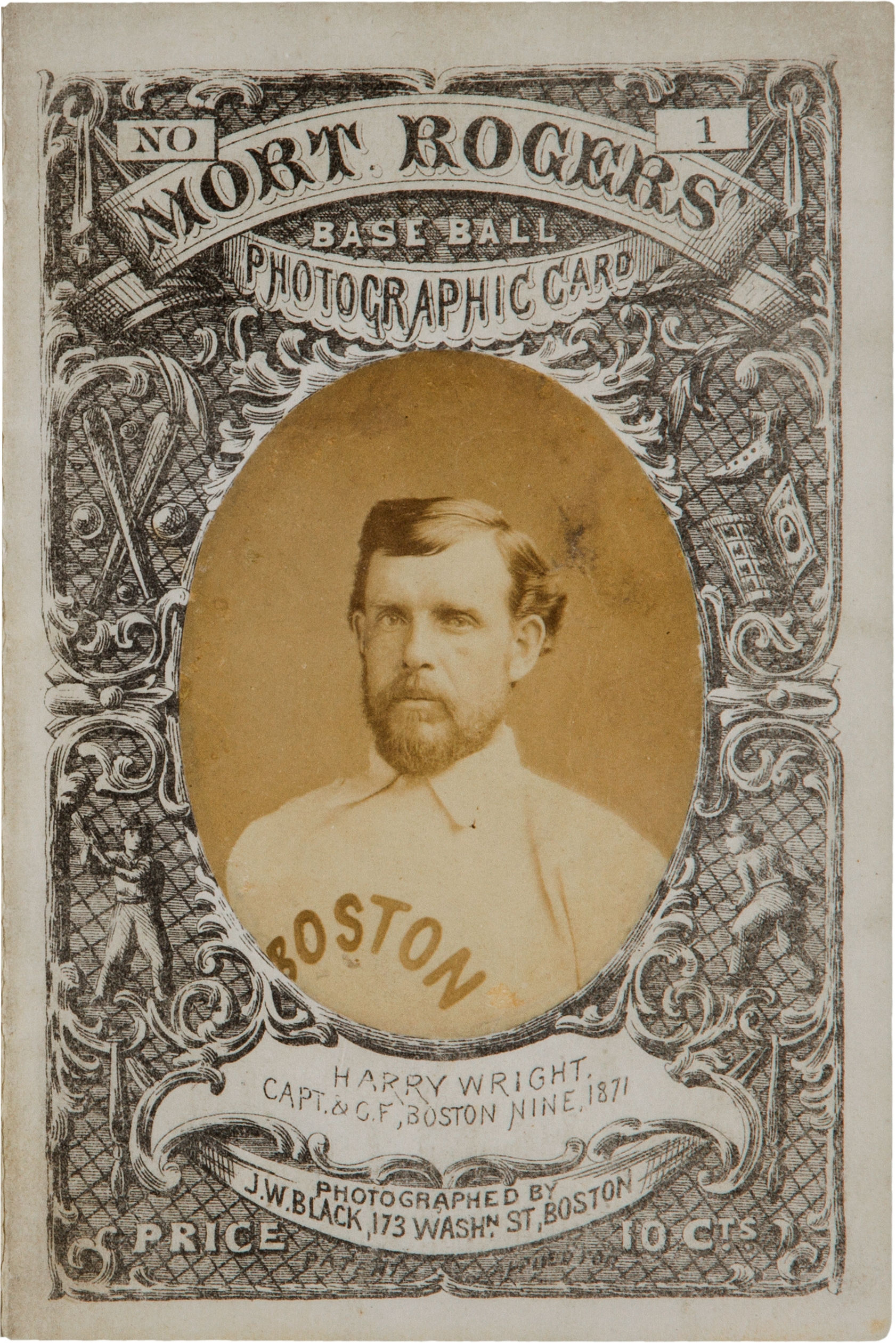
Wright in 1872

From an invitation in 1870 by Ivers Whitney Adams, the founder and President of the Boston Red Stockings, Wright moved from managing the "Cincinnati Red Stockings" to work professionally with the first-ever baseball team in Boston, the "Boston Red Stockings". The team was to play in the newly formed National Association of Professional Base Ball Players, now known more often as simply the National Association.

The Red Stockings finished third in the NA's inaugural season. Wright, now 36 years old was the second-oldest player in the league, behind Nate Berkenstock, aged 38. As the team's regular center fielder, Wright played 30 of the team's 31 games at that position. He also pitched in nine games in relief of Albert Spalding, notching one win.

In 1872, the Red Stockings won its first championship, beating Maryland's Lord Baltimore Club by 7 1/2 games. They won again the next season, finishing four games ahead of the Philadelphia White Stockings.

1874 turned out to be Wright's last year as the team's regular center fielder. He had been the oldest player in the NA for three years running. It was also his third straight championship as a manager. That year, he organized what turned out to be a fairly disastrous attempt to take baseball back home to the British Isles.

In 1875, the final year of the NA, the Red Stockings were an amazing 71–8, finishing a full 15 games ahead of the Athletics. Wright, now the oldest player in the league, continued to play regularly in center field for Boston until 1874. After that, he played in just three more games, one in each of the next three seasons.

=== The National League years ===
In 1876, the Boston club joined the new National League. Sportswriters tended to refer to them as the "Red Caps" now, in deference to the resurrected Red Stockings name for the new Cincinnati Club. Although they once again stumbled in their first year in a new league, finishing fourth in 1876, they went on to win two more pennants in the following two seasons with Wright at the helm. The team finished second in 1879, but then slipped badly, finishing sixth in the next two seasons, which wound up being Wright's last two seasons in Boston.

== After Boston ==
=== Providence ===
After leaving the Red Caps, Wright quickly picked up with the Providence Grays, one of the stronger NL teams of the era. In 1882, his first season as Grays manager, the team finished in second place, just three games behind the powerful Chicago White Stockings led by Cap Anson. The team dropped to third the following year, and Wright moved on again.

While in Providence, Wright instituted the concept of a farm team. Wright assembled a team of amateurs, which would play at Messer Street Grounds while the Grays were on the road, with the intention that if one of the senior members was injured, he could be easily replaced from among these players.

=== Philadelphia ===
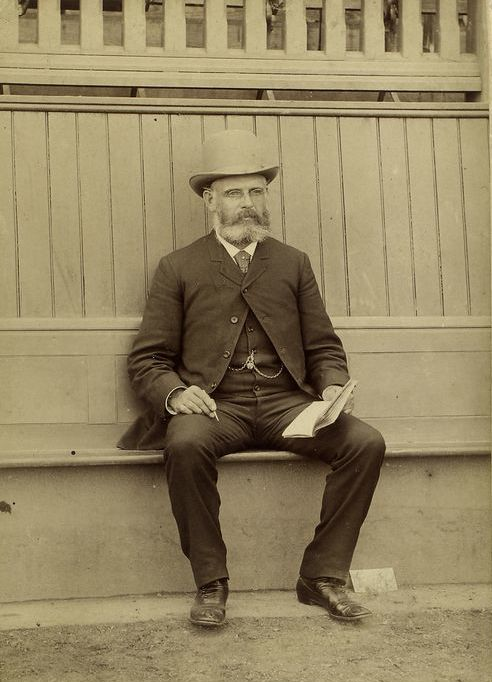
Harry Wright

In 1884, Wright was brought in to manage the new Philadelphia team. Philadelphia had joined the National League the previous year, finishing dead last with an abysmal record of 17–81. Under Wright, they improved enough to finish in sixth place in 1884 while winning 20 games more than they had done the previous year. In 1885, the team finished above .500 for the first time, going 56–54 and finishing in third place, a distant 30 games behind the White Stockings and 28 games behind second-place New York Giants.

Philadelphia continued to improve under Wright in 1886, finishing with a record of 71–43, although their position in the league fell to fourth. In 1887, the team finished in second place, just 3 1/2 games behind the champion Detroit club. Unfortunately, that was to be the high-water mark of Wright's tenure in Philadelphia, as the team hovered in the middle of the pack, finishing between third and fifth every year from 1888 until 1893 (although he missed a large portion of the 1890 season due to problems with his eyesight).

During Wright's tenure in Philadelphia, he often clashed with team owners Al Reach and Colonel John I. Rogers. After the 1893 season, his contract was not renewed. The National League, in recognition of Wright's standing, offered him the position of Chief of Umpires. During his career, Wright had often served as umpire, even for games involving rival teams, due to his high ethical standards.

== Managerial overview ==
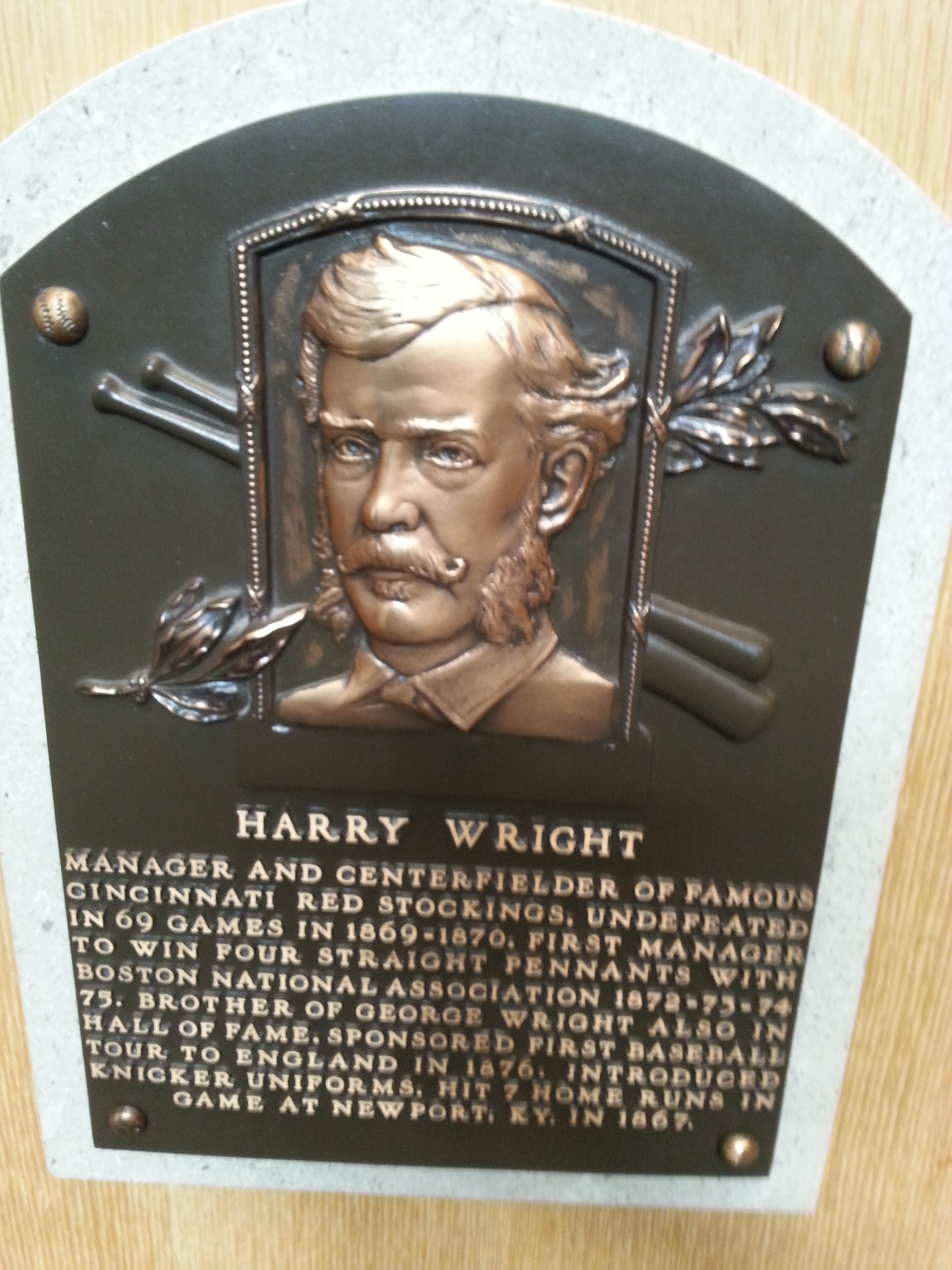
Wright's plaque at the National Baseball Hall of Fame and Museum

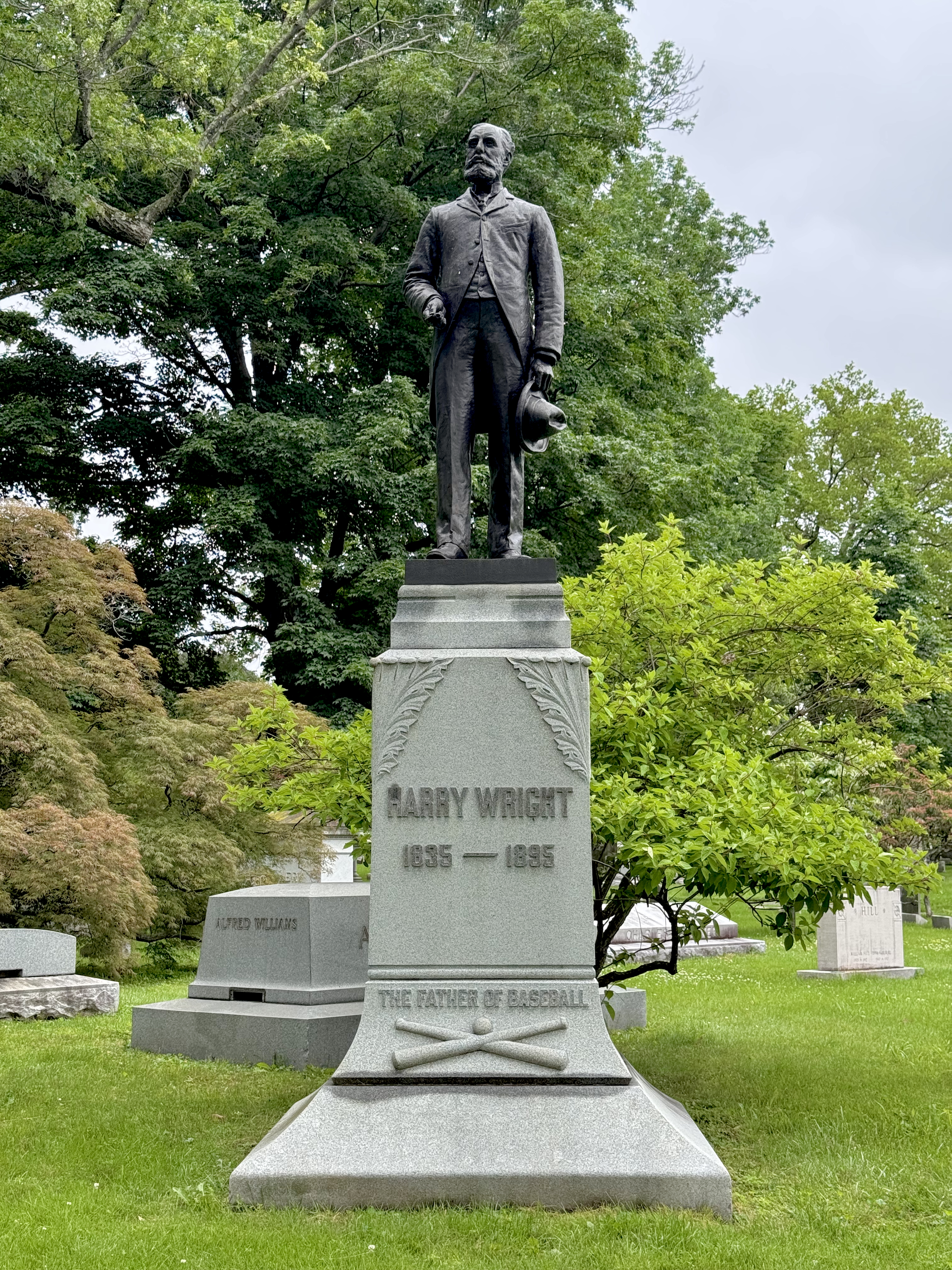
Harry Wright's gravemarker at West Laurel Hill Cemetery in Bala Cynwyd, Pennsylvania

In 23 seasons of managing in the National Association and National League, Wright's teams won six league championships (1872–1875, 1877, 1878). They finished second on three other occasions, and never finished lower than sixth. Wright finished his managerial career with 1,225 wins and 885 losses for a .581 winning percentage. He was the first manager to reach one thousand wins as a manager and Cap Anson was the only other manager who won 1,000 games in the 19th century (Wright briefly held the record for most managerial wins, now he ranks 44th).

Team	Year	Regular season					Postseason			
Team	Year	Games	Won	Lost	Win %	Finish	Won	Lost	Win %	Result
BOS	1871	31	20	10	.667	3rd in NA	–	–	–	–
BOS	1872	48	39	8	.830	1st in NA	–	–	–	–
BOS	1873	60	43	16	.729	1st in NA	–	–	–	–
BOS	1874	71	52	18	.743	1st in NA	–	–	–	–
BOS	1875	82	71	8	.899	1st in NA	–	–	–	–
BOS	1876	70	39	31	.557	4th in NL	–	–	–	–
BOS	1877	61	42	18	.700	1st in NL	–	–	–	–
BOS	1878	60	41	19	.683	1st in NL	–	–	–	–
BOS	1879	84	54	30	.643	2nd in NL	–	–	–	–
BOS	1880	86	40	44	.476	6th in NL	–	–	–	–
BOS	1881	83	38	45	.458	6th in NL	–	–	–	–
PRO	1882	84	52	32	.619	2nd in NL	–	–	–	–
PRO	1883	98	58	40	.592	3rd in NL	–	–	–	–
PHI	1884	113	39	73	.348	6th in NL	–	–	–	–
PHI	1885	111	56	54	.509	3rd in NL	–	–	–	–
PHI	1886	119	71	43	.623	4th in NL	–	–	–	–
PHI	1887	128	75	48	.610	2nd in NL	–	–	–	–
PHI	1888	132	69	61	.531	3rd in NL	–	–	–	–
PHI	1889	130	63	64	.496	4th in NL	–	–	–	–
PHI	1890	68	36	31	.537	3rd in NL	–	–	–	–
PHI	1891	138	68	69	.496	4th in NL	–	–	–	–
PHI	1892	77	46	30	.605	3rd in NL	-	-	-	-
PHI	1892	78	41	36	.532	5th in NL	-	-	-	-
PHI	1893	133	72	57	.558	4th in NL	–	–	–	–
Total		2,145 (Note: Wright also managed in 35 games that ended in a tie)	1,225	885	.581		-	-	-	

== Death ==
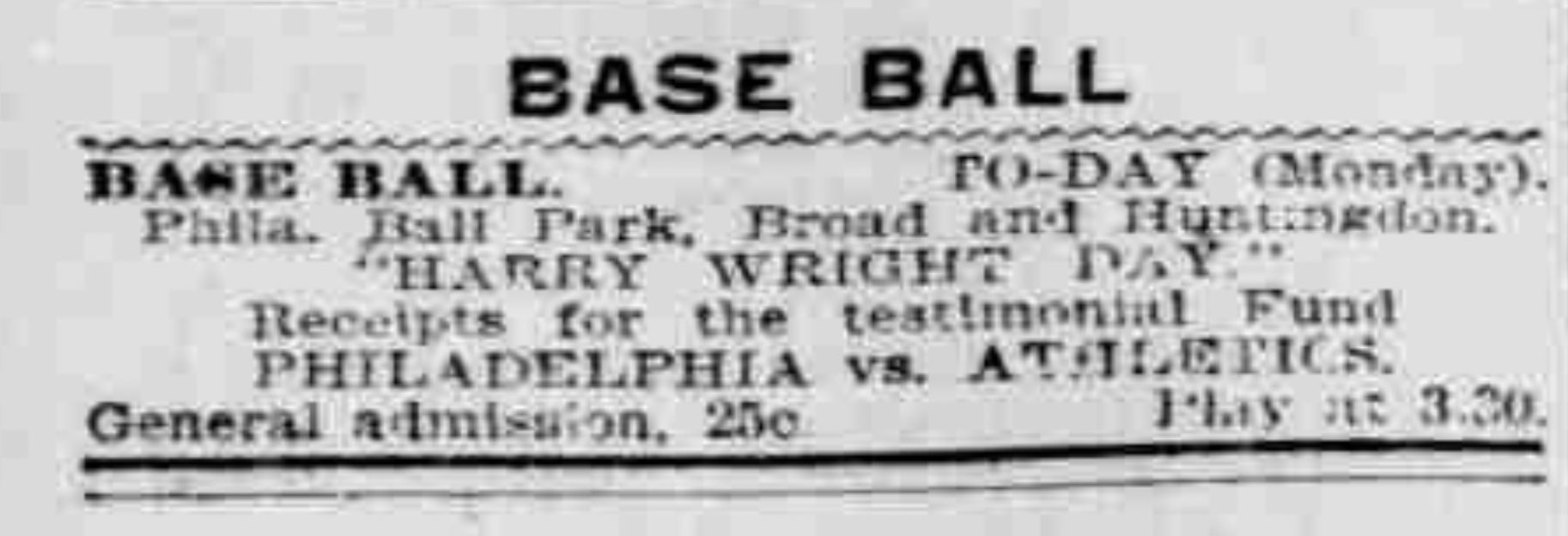
April 13, 1896 advertisement for "Harry Wright Day" in Philadelphia

Wright died of a lung ailment on October 3, 1895, in Atlantic City, New Jersey. He was 60 years old. He was buried in West Laurel Hill Cemetery, Bala Cynwyd, Pennsylvania.

Wright's influence on professional baseball was profound and his death reverberated through the sport. The National League dedicated April 13, 1896, as "Wright Day" and the receipts of eight games played that day dedicated to the establishment of a memorial in Wright's memory. Albert Spalding, then age 46, agreed to appear at the game in Rockford, Illinois, and Henry Chadwick, age 80, scored the exhibition game in Cincinnati to honor Wright.

The Philadelphia Inquirer wrote, "Harry Wright came to [Philadelphia] in the zenith of his powers as a base ball manager, and what he did for the development of the local end of the national game of base ball is a matter of history. It was here that he passed the evening of his life, beloved by all whose good fortune it was to know him. Here it was that he had his little home stake, and here in the impressive silence of beautiful West Laurel Hill his mortal remains lie buried. His work was an honor to Philadelphians, who will doubtless turn and give substantial evidence of their appreciation of that honor."

Wright was inducted into the Baseball Hall of Fame in 1953. He was inducted into the Cincinnati Reds Hall of Fame in 2005. His brother George is also a member of both Halls; a third brother, Sam, also played professionally.

== See also ==
- List of Major League Baseball annual saves leaders
- List of Major League Baseball player-managers
- List of Major League Baseball managers with most career wins

== Notes ==
Achievements
Preceded by Start of professional baseball	All-time saves leader 1871–1893	Succeeded by Tony Mullane
Records
Preceded by Bill Lennon	Oldest recognized verified living baseball player May 5, 1871 – October 30, 1871	Succeeded by Nate Berkenstock
