= Jim Ward (baseball) =

American baseball player (1855–1886)

- Catcher
- Born: March 2, 1855; Boston, Massachusetts, U.S.
- Died: June 4, 1886 (aged 31); Boston, Massachusetts, U.S.
- Batted: Unknown Threw: Unknown

MLB debut
- August 3, 1876, for the Philadelphia Athletics

Last MLB appearance
- August 3, 1876, for the Philadelphia Athletics

MLB statistics
- Batting average: .500
- Hits: 2
- At bats: 4
- Stats at Baseball Reference

Teams
- Philadelphia Athletics (1876)

James H. H. Ward (March 2, 1855 – June 4, 1886) was an American catcher in Major League Baseball who played for the Philadelphia Athletics in its 1876 season.

Ward was born and died in Boston, Massachusetts.
