= Samuel Wright Sr. =

English-American cricketer (1812–1877)

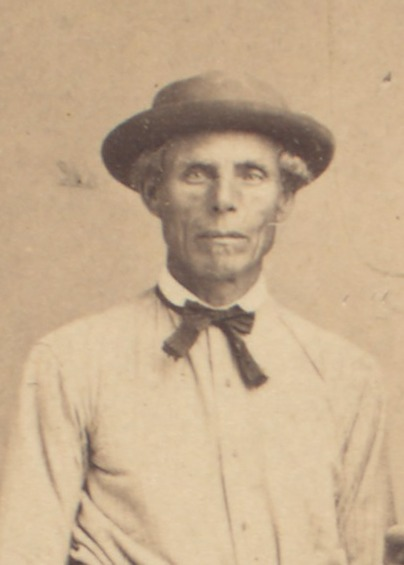
Sam Wright Sr.

Samuel Wright Sr. (22 May 1812 - 19 December 1877), known generally as Samuel Wright or Sam Wright, was an English-American cricketer and father of two baseball Hall-of-famers, Harry Wright and George Wright. He was a member and groundskeeper of the St George's Cricket Club in New York City.

Samuel Wright was born in Sheffield, England in 1812. He married Ann Tone Wright. He moved to New York sometime in the 1830s and joined the St George's Cricket Club, where he was a member until 1869. In 1844, he participated in the first international cricket match between teams representing the United States and Canada, held at the club, and took five wickets in Canada's first innings. He served as a player, manager and groundskeeper. By 1870 he had moved to Boston and he died there living with his son George in 1877. He also was noted as a woodturner. He is buried in Forest Hills Cemetery in Jamaica Plain, Massachusetts.

He and his wife Ann had 5 children: Harry, born in Sheffield, George, Samuel Wright Jr, Daniel, and Mary. Both Harry and George would become famous baseball players and are in the Major League Baseball Hall of Fame. Sam also played in the Major League.
