= Clipper Flynn =

American baseball player (1849–1881)

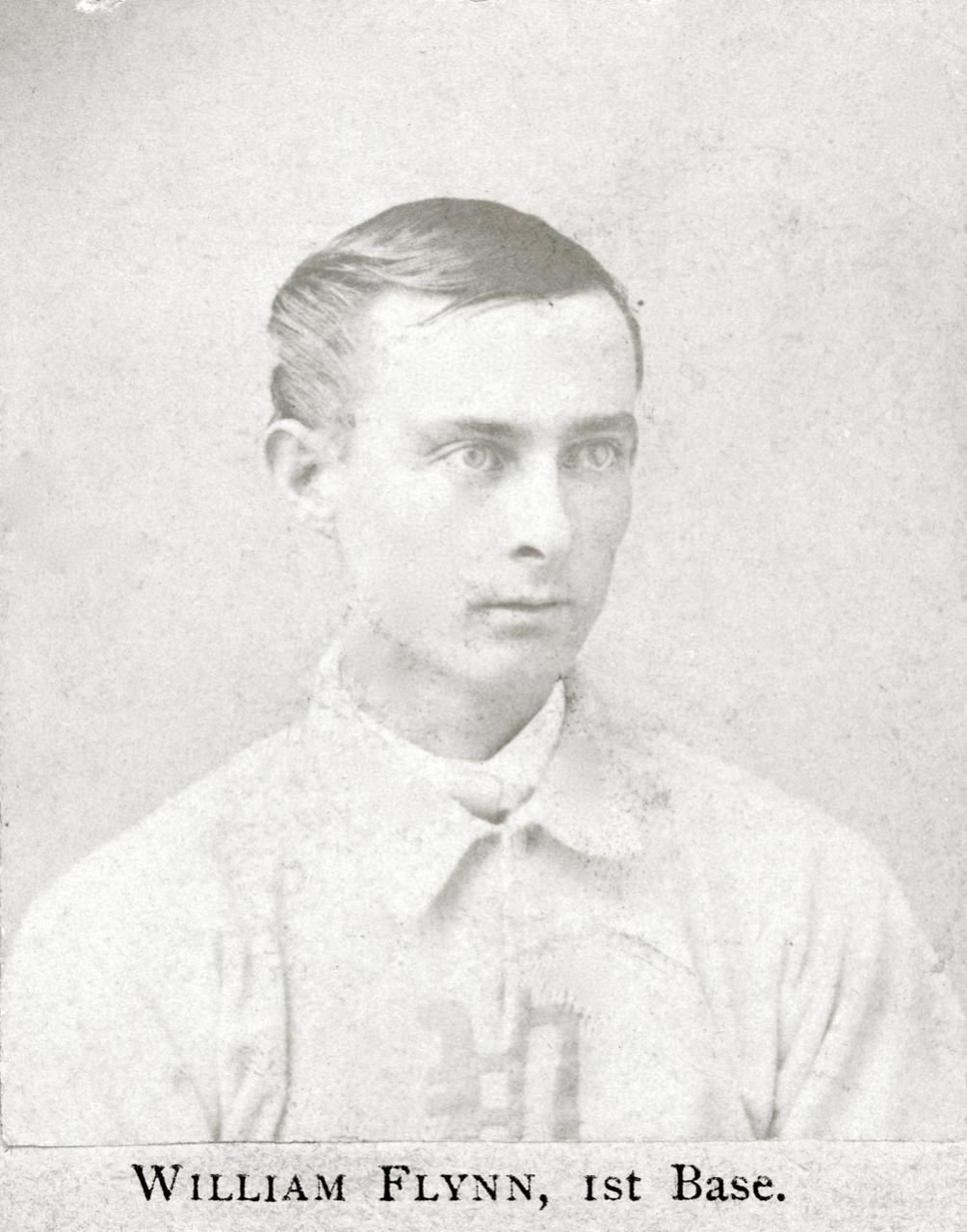
- First baseman
- Born: April 29, 1849; Lansingburgh, New York, U.S.
- Died: November 5, 1881 (aged 32); Troy, New York, U.S.
- Batted: Unknown Threw: Right

MLB debut
- May 9, 1871, for the Troy Haymakers

Last MLB appearance
- May 24, 1872, for the Washington Olympics

MLB statistics
- Games played: 38
- Batting average: .313
- Runs batted in: 29
- Stats at Baseball Reference

Teams
- National Association of Base Ball Players Troy Haymakers (1867–1869) Chicago White Stockings (1870) National Association of Professional BBP Troy Haymakers (1871) Washington Olympics (1872)

William "Clipper" Flynn (April 29, 1849 – November 5, 1881) was an American professional baseball player who played in the National Association as a first baseman for the 1871 Troy Haymakers and the 1872 Washington Olympics.
