= Frank Abercrombie =

American baseball player (1850–1939)

- Shortstop
- Born: January 2, 1850; Fort Towson, Oklahoma, US
- Died: November 11, 1939 (aged 89); Philadelphia, Pennsylvania, US
- Batted: Unknown Threw: Unknown

MLB debut
- October 21, 1871, for the Troy Haymakers

Last MLB appearance
- October 21, 1871, for the Troy Haymakers

MLB statistics
- Games played: 1
- Hits: 0
- At bats: 4
- Stats at Baseball Reference

Teams
- Troy Haymakers (1871)

Francis Patterson Abercrombie (January 2, 1850 – November 11, 1939) was an American professional baseball shortstop who made one appearance in the National Association for the Troy Haymakers in 1871.

== Early life and education ==
Abercrombie was born in Fort Towson, Oklahoma, then part of Indian Territory. His father was United States Army officer John Joseph Abercrombie, who would later go on to be one of the oldest field officers to serve in the American Civil War. Abercrombie attended Rensselaer Polytechnic Institute in Troy, New York, where he played baseball.

== Professional baseball career ==
Abercrombie played in his only professional baseball game on October 21, 1871, against the Chicago White Stockings. Batting seventh in the Haymakers' lineup, Abercrombie recorded zero hits in four plate appearances, and in six fielding chances at short, recorded three assists, one putout, and two errors (out of 11 total committed by Troy). The Haymakers lost by a score of 11–5. For Troy's next game (their last of the season), their regular shortstop Dickie Flowers reclaimed his usual position.

== Later life and death ==
After his brief time in professional baseball, Abercrombie worked as a civil engineer, and at one point served as the superintendent of the New York Division of the Pennsylvania Railroad.

Abercrombie died in Philadelphia, Pennsylvania in 1939.
