= Olympics Grounds =

Coordinates: 38°54′52.2″N 77°2′14.7″W

Olympics Grounds was a baseball grounds located in Washington, D.C. It was home to the Washington Olympics of the National Association in 1871–1872 and home to the short-lived Washington clubs of 1873 and 1875, including the Washington Blue Legs. It is considered a major league ballpark by those who count the NA as a major league.

Local newspapers frequently used the alternate name Olympic Grounds or sometimes Olympic's Grounds, "Olympic" being the formal name of the club. Prior to obtaining this ball field, the club played home games on the White Lot, which the newspapers also called "Olympic Grounds". A later "Olympic Grounds" ballpark for amateur clubs was built in Georgetown.

The ballfield was located at 16th Street NW (east); 17th Street NW (west); and S Street NW (south) (although local newspapers in 1870 gave the location as "corner 16th and R streets"); about a mile west-southwest of the eventual site of Griffith Stadium. The neighborhood is now a combination of residences and commercial businesses.
