= George Heubel =

American baseball player (1849–1896)

- Outfielder
- Born: June 20, 1849; Germany
- Died: January 22, 1896 (aged 46); Philadelphia, Pennsylvania, U.S.
- Batted: Unknown Threw: Unknown

Major league debut
- May 20, 1871, for the Philadelphia Athletics

Last major league appearance
- August 17, 1876, for the New York Mutuals

Major league statistics
- Batting average: .255
- Home runs: 0
- Runs batted in: 14
- Stats at Baseball Reference

Teams
- National Association of Base Ball Players: Quaker City of Philadelphia (1867); Geary of Philadelphia (1868); Philadelphia Athletics (1869); Cleveland Forest Citys (1870); League player: Philadelphia Athletics (1871); Washington Olympics (1872); New York Mutuals (1876)

George A. Heubel (June 20, 1849 – January 22, 1896) was an American professional baseball player. He was the first player born in Germany to play in the National Association and the National League.

== Career ==
Heubel started his amateur career in 1867 with the Quaker City team. He then played for Geary in 1868 and the Philadelphia Athletics in 1869. In 1870, he was the left fielder for the Cleveland Forest Citys.

The National Association of Professional Base Ball Players started play in 1871, and in its first season, Heubel was the right fielder for the Athletics. He batted .307 in 17 games (the team played 28 in total), and the Athletics won the first NA pennant. In 1872, he played five games in center field for the Washington Olympics and then retired as a player. He worked as an umpire for the NA in 1875.

The National League formed in 1876, and Heubel umpired for the league that season. He also played one game for the New York Mutuals. In 1887, he managed the Allentown Peanut Eaters of the Pennsylvania State Association.

Heubel later became a groundskeeper for the Philadelphia Phillies. In 1894, however, he was held responsible for a fire at the ballpark and was subsequently fired.

Heubel was also a clerk. He died in 1896, at the age of 46, and was buried in Leverington Cemetery in Philadelphia, Pennsylvania.

== See also ==
- List of Major League Baseball players from Europe
