= Flip Lafferty =

American baseball player (1854–1910)

- Center fielder/Pitcher
- Born: May 4, 1854; Scranton, Pennsylvania
- Died: February 8, 1910 (aged 55); Wilmington, Delaware
- Batted: Unknown Threw: Right

MLB debut
- September 15, 1876, for the Philadelphia Athletics

Last MLB appearance
- October 2, 1877, for the Louisville Grays

MLB statistics
- Win–loss record: 0-1
- Earned run average: 0.00
- Batting average: .050
- Stats at Baseball Reference

Teams
- Philadelphia Athletics (1876); Louisville Grays (1877)

Frank Bernard "Flip" Lafferty (May 4, 1854 – February 2, 1910) was a Major League Baseball player. He played parts of two seasons in the majors.

== Biography ==
In 1876, Lafferty appeared in one game as a pitcher for the Philadelphia Athletics. Despite not giving up any earned runs, he gave up three unearned runs and lost the game, leaving him with an 0–1 record despite an ERA of 0.00.

In 1877, Lafferty moved on to the Louisville Grays, where he appeared in four games in center field. He managed just one hit (a double) in 17 at bats, for a batting average of .059, placing his career average at .050.

== Death and interment ==
Lafferty died on February 8, 1910, and was interred at Wilmington and Brandywine Cemetery in Wilmington, Delaware.

== Sources ==
- Career statistics from Baseball Reference, or Baseball Reference (Minors)
