= Whitey Ritterson =

American baseball player (1855–1917)

- Catcher
- Born: April 26, 1855; Philadelphia, Pennsylvania
- Died: July 28, 1917 (aged 62); Bucks County, Pennsylvania
- Batted: Right Threw: Right

MLB debut
- May 2, 1876, for the Philadelphia Athletics

Last MLB appearance
- August 9, 1876, for the Philadelphia Athletics

MLB statistics
- Batting average: .250
- Home runs: 0
- Runs batted in: 4
- Stats at Baseball Reference

Teams
- Philadelphia Athletics (1876)

Edward West "Whitey" Ritterson (April 26, 1855 – July 28, 1917) was a professional baseball player who played mainly as a catcher for one season in the National League with the Philadelphia Athletics in 1876. His height was listed at 5-foot-8-inch (1.73 m).

== Biography ==
Ritterson was born in Philadelphia, Pennsylvania on April 26, 1855, and was married to Amanda Burke Ritterson.

Before his National League career, he played for the independent Philadelphia Centennials. He played an exhibition match for the Athletics in April 1876 before making his official debut on May 2, during which he had one hit in an 11–5 win against the New York Mutuals. He played his final game on August 9, after he refused to catch in the ninth inning due to pain in his hands.

Ritterson subsequently joined the Ludlows of Kentucky in 1877, but injured his hands during a practice match against the Louisville Grays and was fired. Louisville outfielder George Hall organized a collection from the players to allow Ritterson to return to Philadelphia.

== Death and interment ==
Ritterson died suddenly in Sellersville, Pennsylvania on July 28, 1917. He was interred at the Reform Cemetery in Perkasie, Pennsylvania.
