= Edward Beavens =

American baseball player

- Second baseman
- Born: c. 1848; Troy, New York, U.S.

MLB debut
- May 9, 1871, for the Troy Haymakers

Last MLB appearance
- August 22, 1872, for the Brooklyn Atlantics

MLB statistics
- At bats: 58
- Hits: 15
- Batting average: .259
- Stats at Baseball Reference

Teams
- National Association of Base Ball Players Peconic of Brooklyn (1867) Powhatan of Brooklyn (1869) Star of Brooklyn (1870) National Association of Professional BBP Troy Haymakers (1871) Brooklyn Atlantics (1872)

Edward P. Beavens (c. 1848 – Unknown) was an American professional baseball player who played in the National Association as a second baseman for the 1871 Troy Haymakers and 1872 Brooklyn Atlantics.
