= William Coon =

American baseball player (1855–1915)

- Catcher/Right fielder
- Born: March 21, 1855; Philadelphia, Pennsylvania, U.S.
- Died: August 30, 1915 (aged 60); Burlington, New Jersey, U.S.
- Batted: Unknown Threw: Unknown

MLB debut
- September 4, 1875, for the Philadelphia Athletics

Last MLB appearance
- September 16, 1876, for the Philadelphia Athletics

MLB statistics
- Batting average: .224
- Home runs: 0
- Runs batted in: 23
- Stats at Baseball Reference

Teams
- Philadelphia Athletics (1875–1876)

William K. Coon (March 21, 1855 – August 30, 1915) was an American Major League Baseball player. Coon played for the Philadelphia Athletics in 1875 and 1876.

Coon played 30 games as an outfielder, 22 games as a catcher, 4 games as a second baseman and third baseman, and 2 games as a pitcher.

He was born in Philadelphia, Pennsylvania, and died in Burlington, New Jersey.
