= Lou Paul =

American baseball player

- Catcher
- Batted: Right Threw: Right

MLB debut
- September 5, 1876, for the Philadelphia Athletics

Last MLB appearance
- September 8, 1876, for the Philadelphia Athletics

MLB statistics
- Batting average: .167
- Home runs: 0
- Runs batted in: 0
- Stats at Baseball Reference

Teams
- Philadelphia Athletics (1876)

Louis "Lou" Paul was a Major League Baseball player who played for the Philadelphia Athletics in 1876.

It is not known where and when Paul was born or died.
