= Ned Connor =

American baseball player (1850–1898)

- First baseman/Outfielder
- Born: c. 1850; New York City, U.S.
- Died: January 28, 1898; Philadelphia, Pennsylvania, U.S.
- Batted: Unknown Threw: Unknown

MLB debut
- May 18, 1871, for the Troy Haymakers

Last MLB appearance
- October 23, 1871, for the Troy Haymakers

MLB statistics
- Batting average: .212
- Home runs: 0
- Runs batted in: 2
- Stats at Baseball Reference

Teams
- Troy Haymakers (1871)

Edward Connor (c. 1850 – January 28, 1898) was an American professional baseball player who played one season in the National Association, for the 1871 Troy Haymakers. He appeared in seven games, and had a .212 batting average in 33 at bats, and scored six runs. A native of New York, he died in Philadelphia at the age of 47 or 48 of internal hemorrhage, and is interred at Holy Cross Cemetery in Philadelphia.
