= Bill Fouser =

American baseball player (1855–1919)

- Second baseman
- Born: October , 1855; Philadelphia, Pennsylvania, U.S.
- Died: March 1, 1919 (aged 63); Philadelphia, Pennsylvania, U.S.
- Batted: Unknown Threw: Unknown

MLB debut
- April 22, 1876, for the Philadelphia Athletics

Last MLB appearance
- September 16, 1876, for the Philadelphia Athletics

MLB statistics
- Batting average: .135
- Home runs: 0
- Runs batted in: 2
- Stats at Baseball Reference

Teams
- Philadelphia Athletics (1876)

William C. Fouser (October 1855 – March 1, 1919) was an American Major League Baseball player. Fouser played for the Philadelphia Athletics in 1876.

Fouser was born and died in Philadelphia, Pennsylvania. He was interred in Monument Cemetery.
