= Dave Eggler =

American baseball player (1849–1902)

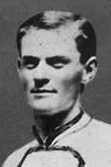
- Center fielder
- Born: April 30, 1849; Brooklyn, New York, U.S.
- Died: April 5, 1902 (aged 52); Buffalo, New York, U.S.
- Batted: Right Threw: Right

Major league debut
- May 18, 1871, for the New York Mutuals

Last major league appearance
- June 9, 1885, for the Buffalo Bisons

Major league statistics
- Batting average: .274
- Runs scored: 491
- Runs batted in: 242
- Stats at Baseball Reference

Teams
- National Association of Base Ball Players Brooklyn Eckfords (1868) New York Mutuals (1869–1870) League player New York Mutuals (1871–1873) Philadelphia White Stockings (1874) Athletic of Philadelphia (1875–1876) Chicago White Stockings (1877) Buffalo Bisons (1879) Baltimore Orioles (1883) Buffalo Bisons (1883–1885)

Career highlights and awards
- Led NA in runs scored (1872)

David Daniel Eggler (April 30, 1849 – April 5, 1902) was an American professional baseball center fielder. He was born in Brooklyn, New York.

Eggler's career began in the National Association of Base Ball Players with the New York Mutuals in 1868, and was a member of the Mutuals when they joined the professional National Association in 1871. He went on to play for the Philadelphia White Stockings and Athletic of Philadelphia in the NA.

After the formation of the National League, Eggler remained with Philadelphia, then went on to play for the Chicago White Stockings, Buffalo Bisons, and Baltimore Orioles before his career ended.

Dave Eggler now holds an unfortunate record, as his 2,544 at-bats and 2,593 plate appearances are the most by any player with 0 career home runs, statistically making him the game's least prolific home run hitter. However, because his career began before the formation of the modern National League, the record isn't universally recognized as Eggler's. Also, the rarity of the home run during his career means that his inability to hit one was understandable; in 1871 (the first year of his career), his entire league combined to hit 47 home runs - a single-season home run mark that has been equalled or surpassed by 62 different individuals a combined 107 times since then.

He died after being hit by a train in Buffalo, New York.

== See also ==
- List of Major League Baseball annual runs scored leaders
