= John Mullen (catcher) =

American baseball player (1856–1909)

- Catcher
- Born: January 1856; Philadelphia, Pennsylvania, U.S.
- Died: January 27, 1909 (aged 52–53); Philadelphia, Pennsylvania, U.S.
- Batted: Unknown Threw: Unknown

MLB debut
- September 9, 1876, for the Philadelphia Athletics

Last MLB appearance
- September 9, 1876, for the Philadelphia Athletics

MLB statistics
- Batting average: .000
- Hits: 0
- At bats: 3
- Stats at Baseball Reference

Teams
- Philadelphia Athletics (1876)

John Mullen (January 1856 – January 27, 1909) was an American Major League Baseball player. Mullen played for the Philadelphia Athletics in 1876.
