= John Bergh =

American baseball player (1857–1883)

- Catcher
- Born: October 8, 1857; Boston, Massachusetts, U.S.
- Died: April 17, 1883 (aged 25); Boston, Massachusetts, U.S.
- Batted: Unknown Threw: Unknown

MLB debut
- August 5, 1876, for the Philadelphia Athletics

Last MLB appearance
- June 9, 1876, for the Boston Red Caps

MLB statistics
- Batting average: .182
- Hits: 8
- At bats: 44
- Stats at Baseball Reference

Teams
- Philadelphia Athletics (1876); Boston Red Caps (1880)

John Baptist Bergh (October 8, 1857 – April 17, 1883) was an American professional baseball player from Boston, Massachusetts. He played one game in the outfield for the 1876 Philadelphia Athletics and 11 games as a catcher for the 1880 Boston Red Caps. He died in his hometown of Boston at the age of 25 of consumption, and is interred at Holyhood Cemetery in Brookline, Massachusetts.
