= John Curran (baseball) =

Irish baseball player (1852–1896)

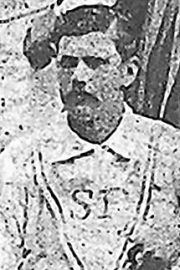
- Catcher
- Born: c. 1852; Ireland
- Died: September 26, 1896 (aged 43–44); Vallejo, California, United States
- Batted: Unknown Threw: Unknown

MLB debut
- September 12, 1876, for the Philadelphia Athletics

Last MLB appearance
- September 15, 1876, for the Philadelphia Athletics

MLB statistics
- Batting average: .333
- Hits: 4
- At bats: 12
- Stats at Baseball Reference

Teams
- Philadelphia Athletics (1876)

John Henry Curran was an Irish professional baseball player who appeared in three games for the Philadelphia Athletics in 1876. He was long listed as "Peter Curren" but SABR researchers discovered his true identity in 2009.
