= Count Sensenderfer =

American baseball player (1847–1903)

- Outfielder
- Born: December 28, 1847; Philadelphia, Pennsylvania, US
- Died: May 3, 1903 (aged 55); Philadelphia, Pennsylvania, US
- Batted: Unknown Threw: Unknown

MLB debut
- May 20, 1871, for the Philadelphia Athletics

Last MLB appearance
- October 21, 1874, for the Philadelphia Athletics

MLB statistics
- Batting average: .299
- Home runs: 0
- Runs batted in: 34
- Stats at Baseball Reference

Teams
- National Association of Base Ball Players Philadelphia Athletics (1866–1870) National Association of Professional BBP Philadelphia Athletics (1871–1874)

John Phillips Jenkins "Count" Sensenderfer (December 28, 1847 – May 3, 1903) was an American professional baseball player who played for the Philadelphia Athletics from 1866 to 1874.

== Early life ==
John Phillip Jenkins Sensenderfer was born on December 28, 1847, in Philadelphia, Pennsylvania, to James, a carpenter, and his wife Mary. Initially, he grew up in the Spring Garden neighborhood of Philadelphia, but later moved to different parts of the city. He had at least three brothers (George, William, James), and two sisters (Mary and Hannah).

== Career ==
Sensenderfer joined the Athletic club at the age of eighteen in 1866, and "The Count" (he got the nickname from his moustache and aristocratic air) quickly became one of the top players in the country. Originally playing second base before moving to center field, Count was one of the first players to score two hundred runs in a season, for the championship Philadelphia team of 1868. The following year, Athletic turned professional; in 1871 the club helped form the National Association of Professional Base Ball Players, baseball's first all-professional league.

In 1871 Sensenderfer (still a solid hitter with a .323 average) began to be plagued by a series of injuries. He badly injured his knee stealing second base in a game against Forrest City on August 20th, 1871. The injury ended his season, keeping him out of the championship contest played October 30 in Brooklyn. The Athletics turned to right fielder George Bechtel to take Count's place in center, while Nate Berkenstock, a 40-year-old amateur retired from Athletic for five years, played right; it was his only big-league appearance. Athletic defeated Chicago, 4-1, clinching the title.

Sensenderfer's injuries kept him out of all but one game in 1872; he returned as the club's regular center fielder in 1873 but his average slipped to .279. He played five more games for Athletic in 1874 before retiring.

== After baseball ==
On October 20, 1881, Sensenderfer married Mary Eudora Wagner in Philadelphia, and listed his religion as protestant episcopal.

After his baseball career, Sensenderfer was involved in politics, serving two terms as Philadelphia County Commissioner. He was also an active member of the Democratic Committee of Philadelphia as well as the Pennsylvania Democratic State Committee.

Sensendefer died on May 3, 1903, at the age of 55 in Philadelphia, and is interred at Lawnview Cemetery in Rockledge, Pennsylvania.
