= Al Wright (baseball manager) =

- Manager
- Born: March 31, 1842; New York City
- Died: April 20, 1905 (aged 63); New York City
- Batted: Unknown Threw: Unknown

MLB debut
- April 22, 1876, for the Philadelphia Athletics

Last MLB appearance
- September 16, 1876, for the Philadelphia Athletics

MLB statistics
- Games: 60
- Win–loss record: 14 – 45
- Winning %: .237

Teams
- Philadelphia Athletics (1876)

Alfred Hector Wright (March 30, 1842 – April 20, 1905) was a Manager in Major League Baseball. He managed the Philadelphia Athletics of the National League during the 1876 season.

His career managerial record was 14–45 in 60 games for a finish of seventh place.
