= Tom Berry (baseball) =

American baseball player (1842–1915)

- Right fielder
- Born: December 31, 1842; Chester, Pennsylvania
- Died: June 6, 1915 (aged 72); Chester, Pennsylvania
- Batted: Unknown Threw: Unknown

MLB debut
- September 2, 1871, for the Philadelphia Athletics

Last MLB appearance
- September 2, 1871, for the Philadelphia Athletics

MLB statistics
- Average: .250
- Home runs: 0
- RBI: 0
- Stats at Baseball Reference

Teams
- National Association of Base Ball Players Philadelphia Athletics (1867–1870) National Association of Professional BBP Philadelphia Athletics (1871)

Thomas Haney Berry (December 31, 1842 – June 6, 1915) was a professional baseball player who played for the Philadelphia Athletics in one game during the 1871 season. He had one hit in four at-bats in that game.

Berry was a soldier in the Union Army from 1862 to 1865 during the American Civil War. He served in Company B of Sixteenth Regiment of the Pennsylvania Volunteers, Company A of the Thirty-Seventh Regiment of Pennsylvania Volunteers and Company A of the Nineteenth Regiment. He died in 1915 in his home town of Chester, Pennsylvania of tuberculosis.

== Sources ==
- Career statistics from Baseball Reference · Retrosheet
