= Nealy Phelps =

American baseball player (1840–1885)

- Right fielder
- Born: November 19, 1840; New York, New York, U.S.
- Died: February 12, 1885 (aged 44); New York, New York, U.S.
- Batted: Unknown Threw: Unknown

Major-league debut
- July 1, 1871, for the Fort Wayne Kekiongas

Last major-league appearance
- August 10, 1876, for the Philadelphia Athletics

Major-league statistics
- Batting average: .109
- Runs: 6
- At bats: 46
- Stats at Baseball Reference

Teams
- Fort Wayne Kekiongas (1871); New York Mutuals (1873–1876); Philadelphia Athletics (1876)

Cornelius Carmen Phelps (November 19, 1840 – February 12, 1885) was an American professional baseball player who played in five major-league seasons, four in the National Association and one in the National League.

Phelps made his major-league debut with the Fort Wayne Kekiongas of the National Association, and played in one game, at first base. In that game, he went hitless in three official at bats, but did draw one base on balls. The next time he appeared in the league, he played one game for the New York Mutuals in 1873. In that game, he went hitless in six at-bats. He made his most significant playing contribution for the Mutuals in 1874, when played in six games, and collected three hits in 24 at-bats for a .125 batting average, and scored five runs. In 1875, he played in two games for the Mutuals, and had two hits in six at-bats, scored one run, and hit one double. On October 12, 1875, a benefit game was played between the Mutuals against the Brooklyn Atlantics, with the proceeds going to Nealy, who also performed as time-keeper for the game.

When the Mutuals transferred their team to the National League in 1876, Phelps played in one game for them, playing in center field, and then he was loaned to the Philadelphia Athletics in a game against the Mutuals on August 10, playing catcher when they were short a player. This was the last game he played in the major leagues.

Phelps died at the age of 44 in New York City, and is interred at Green-Wood Cemetery in Brooklyn.
