= Steve King (baseball) =

American baseball player (1844–1895)

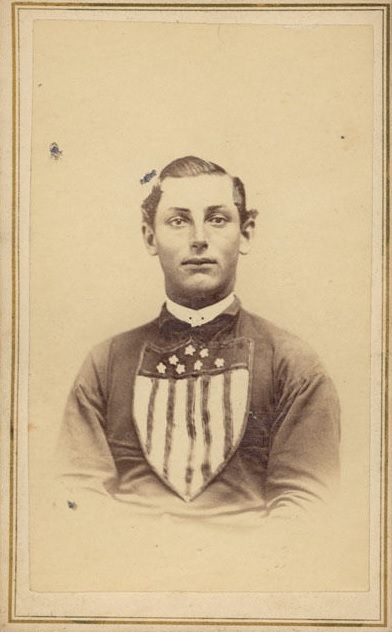
- King in 1866
- Left fielder
- Born: c. 1844; Lansingburgh, New York, U.S.
- Died: July 8, 1895 (aged 50–51); Lansingburgh, New York, U.S.
- Batted: Unknown Threw: Unknown

MLB debut
- May 9, 1871, for the Troy Haymakers

Last MLB appearance
- July 23, 1872, for the Troy Haymakers

MLB statistics
- Games played: 54
- Batting average: .353
- Runs batted in: 54
- Stats at Baseball Reference

Teams
- National Association of Base Ball Players Troy Haymakers (1866–1870) National Association of Professional BBP Troy Haymakers (1871–1872)

Stephen F. King (c. 1844 – July 8, 1895) was an American professional baseball player who played in the National Association as a left fielder for the 1871–1872 Troy Haymakers. He was 5' 9" and weighed 175 lb.

== Career ==
King was born in Lansingburgh, New York, in 1844. From 1866 to 1870, he played for a team alternately called the Unions of Lansingburgh and the Haymakers of Troy. Then, the National Association was formed, and King played for the Troy Haymakers team in 1871 and 1872. He was among the better outfielders in the league in 1871, batting .396 with 34 RBI in 29 games. He finished fourth in the batting race. The following season, King hit .305, and he never appeared in the major leagues again. He died in Lansingburgh in 1895. He was buried at Oakwood Cemetery in Troy, New York.
