= Dickie Flowers =

American baseball player (1850–1892)

- Shortstop
- Born: 1850; Philadelphia, Pennsylvania, U.S.
- Died: October 6, 1892; Philadelphia, Pennsylvania, U.S.
- Batted: Unknown Threw: Unknown

Major-league debut
- June 3, 1871, for the Troy Haymakers

Last major-league appearance
- June 12, 1872, for the Philadelphia Athletics

Major-league statistics
- Games played: 24
- Hits: 37
- Runs batted in: 22
- Stats at Baseball Reference

Teams
- National Association of Base Ball Players Quaker City of Philadelphia (1867) Keystone of Philadelphia (1868–1869) Troy Haymakers (1870) National Association of Professional BBP Troy Haymakers (1871) Philadelphia Athletics (1872)

Charles Richard Flowers (1850 – October 6, 1892) was an American professional baseball player in the National Association. He was a shortstop for the 1871 Troy Haymakers and the 1872 Philadelphia Athletics. Previously, he participated in the first professional season as every-day shortstop for the Keystone club of Philadelphia in 1869, his second season with that team.

== Baseball career ==
In 1867 the 17-year-old Flowers was first shortstop and second catcher for the Quaker City club of Philadelphia in the nominally amateur National Association of Base Ball Players. Quaker City was ambitious but Philadelphia's third team by playing strength, behind the Athletics and Keystones. Flowers scored 112 runs in 27 games, more than four per game and roughly tied with three other players for the team's second-best rate behind first catcher Fergy Malone. The next season, he moved to the Keystones and led the team in games and runs.

When the NABBP permitted openly professional teams for the 1869 season, the Keystones were one of twelve teams that contested the professional pennant race. Flowers played in every known game and he was the third of three players who scored more than three runs per game. Continuing as the regular shortstop, he played some pitcher and catcher, too. The Keystones remained second best in Philadelphia behind the Athletics; they lost all five matches between the two and won only 3 of all 20 professional matches. In 1870 they did not return to the professional field, but Flowers moved to the Haymakers of Troy, New York, a pro team of average strength, where he played all 46 known games.

Troy helped establish the first professional league in 1871 with Dickie Flowers continuing as the regular shortstop and proving to be one of the stronger batters in a powerhouse lineup. Although he was only 21-years-old, his major league career ended after merely three games played for the reigning champion Philadelphia Athletics in 1872.

== Personal life ==
Flowers died in his native Philadelphia at age 42, and is buried at Laurel Hill Cemetery there.
