= Nate Berkenstock =

American baseball player (1832–1900)

- Right fielder
- Born: September 17, 1832; Pennsylvania, U.S.
- Died: February 23, 1900 (aged 67); Philadelphia, Pennsylvania, U.S.
- Batted: Unknown Threw: Unknown

MLB debut
- October 30, 1871, for the Philadelphia Athletics

Last MLB appearance
- October 30, 1871, for the Philadelphia Athletics

MLB statistics
- Games played: 1
- Batting average: .000
- Runs batted in: 0
- Stats at Baseball Reference

Teams
- National Association of Base Ball Players Philadelphia Athletics (1863–1866) National Association of Professional BBP Philadelphia Athletics (1871)

Career highlights and awards
- Earliest-born MLB player

Nathan Berkenstock (September 17, 1832 – February 23, 1900) was an American professional baseball player. He is believed to be the earliest-born professional baseball player, three years older than the next oldest player, Hall of Famer Harry Wright, who was born in 1835. (Originally thought to have been born in 1831, Berkenstock's grave gives his birth year as 1832; see below.) Berkenstock played in just one pro league game: the game that decided the first professional baseball league championship in the United States, in 1871. He was Jewish.

== Early baseball career ==
Exactly when Berkenstock first took up the game of baseball is unknown; the National Association of Base Ball Players, the first organized amateur league, was not founded until 1857, when he was 25. Peter Morris, in But Didn't We Have Fun?: An Informal History of Baseball's Pioneer Era, 1843–1870, mentions him as a noteworthy player from amateur days, but doesn't specify when he began. According to Marshall D. Wright's book, The National Association of Base Ball Players, 1857–1870, Berkenstock debuted with the Athletic Club of Philadelphia (the original team of this name, and not related to the American League team that now plays in West Sacramento) in 1863, when he was 31. The New York Clipper newspaper described Berkenstock as "not a pretty player, being heavy and clumsy, but does good service (and) generally manages to hold any ball thrown to him." He also served as treasurer for the Athletics.

Statistics were very sketchy in the early days of baseball; the only numbers available today are Games Played, Runs Scored and "Hands Lost" (a player was charged with a Hand Lost every time he made an out at bat or on the basepaths). Stats like hits, walks, total bases and runs batted in were still years away from being compiled. Generally speaking, a good player would score more runs than have Hands Lost.

Berkenstock played four years with Athletic, from 1863 to 1866:

Year	Positions	Games	Runs	Hands Lost
1863	1B-OF	9	19	25
1864	1B	8	28	20
1865	1B	15	59	38
1866	1B (reserve)	13	66	48
Totals		45	172	131

Athletic was among the top teams in the nation in the 1860s, winning an (unofficial) national championship in 1867, the year after Berkenstock retired.

== Berkenstock comes back ==
On October 30, 1871, the Athletics met the Chicago White Stockings at the Union Grounds in Brooklyn, to decide the 1871 championship. In the first season of America's first professional league, the National Association, the title was decided not by winning percentage but simply wins; going into the final game, the Athletics had 20 victories (as did the Boston Red Stockings) while Chicago had 19; the "Championship Committee" decreed before the contest that the winner would take the pennant.

The fact that the White Stockings were playing at all was significant: the Great Chicago Fire had earlier that month wiped out their ballpark and all their equipment, forcing them to play their remaining games on the road, wearing makeshift and borrowed uniforms. The Athletics also had problems: center fielder Count Sensenderfer had injured his knee, so they called on Berkenstock—by now a 39-year-old out of the game for five years—to play right field, while right fielder George Bechtel moved to center. Philadelphia won the game, and the championship, by a 4–1 count. Berkenstock failed to get a hit in four trips to the plate (striking out three times), but recorded three putouts in the field, including the final out of the game.

== Personal life ==
Berkenstock was married twice, to Maria Louisa Fable (1832–1871) in 1855, and to Esther H. Gresh (1836–1921) in 1885. With Maria, Nate had two daughters: Lilly L. Berkenstock (1859–1944) and May Malvina Berkenstock (1866–1867). A SABR report indicates he served in the American Civil War, enlisting in 1862 and mustering out after two weeks. In 1885, at age 53, Berkenstock played in an old-timer's game between the Athletic and Brooklyn Atlantics teams.

He died in Philadelphia on February 23, 1900; his obituary ("Old Base Ball Man Dead", Philadelphia Inquirer, Feb 25, 1900, p.4) states that he was "one of the best known hat dealers in this state" and that his home was on Diamond Street. Berkenstock's tombstone gives his birth date as September 17, 1832.

Records
Preceded by Harry Wright	Oldest recognized verified living baseball player October 30, 1871 – February 23, 1900	Succeeded by Dickey Pearce
