= Al Reach =

American baseball player and executive (1840–1928)

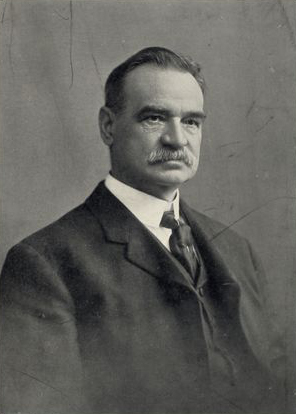
- Right fielder
- Born: May 25, 1840; London, England
- Died: January 14, 1928 (aged 87); Atlantic City, New Jersey, U.S.
- Batted: Left Threw: Left

Major-league debut
- May 20, 1871, for the Philadelphia Athletics

Last major-league appearance
- May 21, 1875, for the Philadelphia Athletics

Major-league statistics
- Batting average: .247
- Home runs: 0
- Runs batted in: 56
- Stats at Baseball Reference

Teams
- National Association of Base Ball Players Brooklyn Eckfords (1861–1864) Philadelphia Athletics (1865–1870) League player Philadelphia Athletics (1871–1875) League manager Philadelphia Phillies (1890)

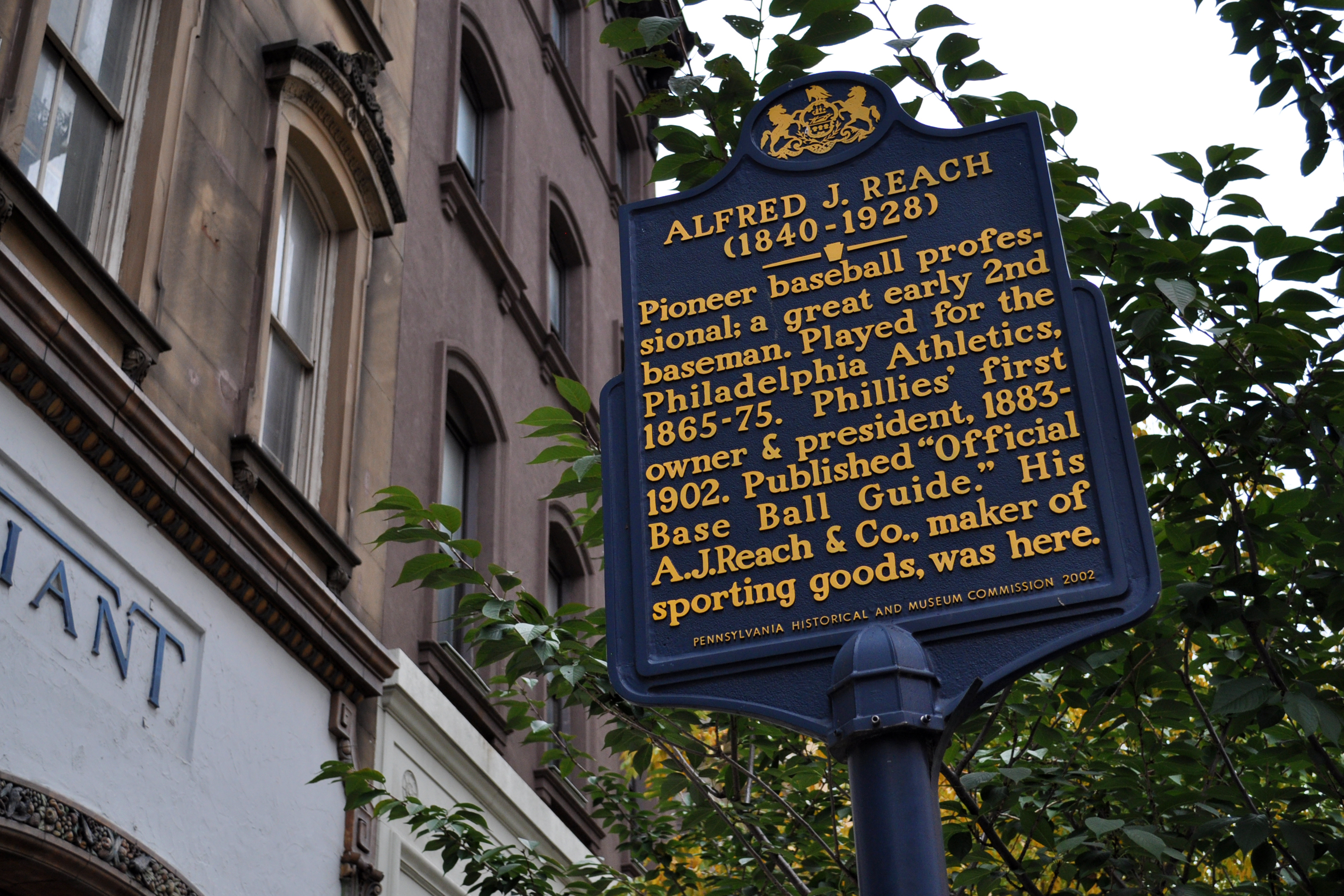
Alfred J. Reach Historical Marker on Chestnut Street in Philadelphia

Alfred James Reach (May 25, 1840 – January 14, 1928) was an American sportsman who was one of the early stars of baseball in the National Association. After his playing career, he went on to become an influential executive, publisher, sporting goods manufacturer, and spokesman for the sport. He was influential in the founding of the Philadelphia Phillies in 1882.

== Early life ==
Reach was born in London, on May 25, 1840.

== Career ==
Reach was a regular for the champion Eckford club in Brooklyn in the early 1860s before moving to the Philadelphia Athletics in 1865, where he became the first publicly professional baseball player. When the National Association began, he helped them win the first professional baseball pennant in 1871.

Upon his retirement from playing, he helped found the Philadelphia Phillies franchise in 1882. Reach served as team president from 1883 to 1899. Later, similarly to Albert Spalding, Reach formed a sporting goods company and earned millions. In fact, he sold his company to Spalding in 1889. Reach was the trade name used on the game balls for the American League until 1976.

Reach kept his interest in the Phillies franchise, selling to a syndicate led by James Potter in 1903.

== Death ==
Reach died at age 87 in Atlantic City, New Jersey, and is interred at West Laurel Hill Cemetery in Bala Cynwyd, Pennsylvania.

== Legacy ==
A Pennsylvania historical marker was dedicated on April 4, 2003 at 1820 Chestnut Street in Philadelphia for Reach's contribution to baseball.

Records
Preceded by Al Barker	Oldest recognized verified living baseball player September 15, 1912 – January 14, 1928	Succeeded by Harry Berthrong
