= Washington Olympics =

Baseball team in Washington, D.C.

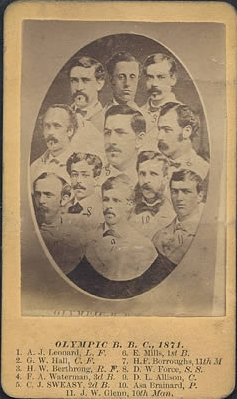
Cabinet card of the 1871 Washington Olympics

The Olympic Club of Washington, D.C., or Washington Olympics in modern nomenclature, was an early professional baseball team.

When the National Association of Base Ball Players permitted openly professional clubs for the 1869 season, the Olympics were one of twelve to go pro. Two years later they were a founding member of the first professional sports league, the National Association of Professional Base Ball Players (NAPBBP or NA, for short). The Olympics played home games at Olympics Grounds in Washington. They were founded by Nicholas Young, an outfielder who continued as non-playing business and field manager after 1870.

For 1871, the Olympics hired five players from the highly-successful Cincinnati Red Stockings after they disbanded. The other half of Cincinnati's roster signed with the new Boston Red Stockings team. With the name "Red Stockings" taken by Boston, local writers dubbed the Olympic club the "Blue Stockings".

The Olympics played 41 games across their two years in the National Association, with 32 games played in 1871 (with a 15-15-2 record) and nine games played in 1872 (with a 2-7 record).

== See also ==
- 1871 Washington Olympics season
- 1872 Washington Olympics season
