= Wes Fisler =

American baseball player (1841–1922)

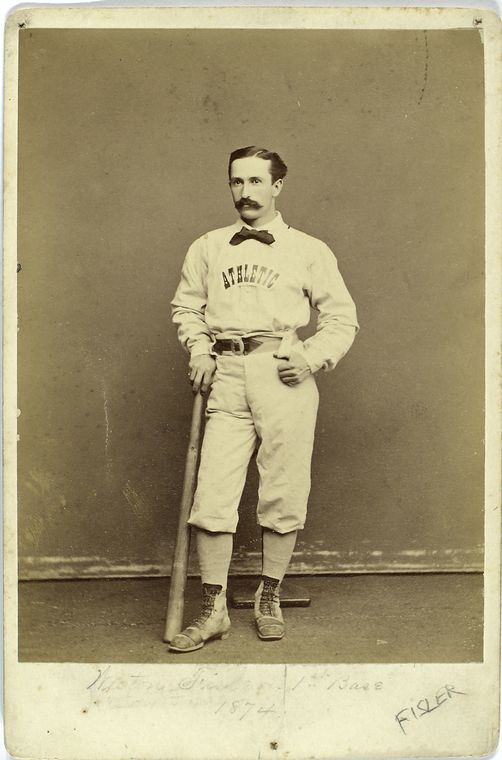
- First baseman / Second baseman
- Born: July 6, 1841; Camden, New Jersey, U.S.
- Died: December 25, 1922 (aged 81); Philadelphia, Pennsylvania, U.S.
- Batted: Right Threw: Right

MLB debut
- May 20, 1871, for the Philadelphia Athletics

Last MLB appearance
- September 16, 1876, for the Philadelphia Athletics

MLB statistics
- Batting average: .310
- Home runs: 2
- Runs batted in: 189
- Stats at Baseball Reference

Teams
- National Association of Base Ball Players Philadelphia Athletics (1866–1870) League Player Philadelphia Athletics (1871–1876)

Weston Dickson Fisler (July 6, 1841 – December 25, 1922) was an American professional baseball player who played for the Philadelphia Athletics from 1871 to 1876. He was an infielder/outfielder who threw right-handed. His father was Lorenzo Fisler, mayor of Camden, New Jersey from 1853 to 1855.

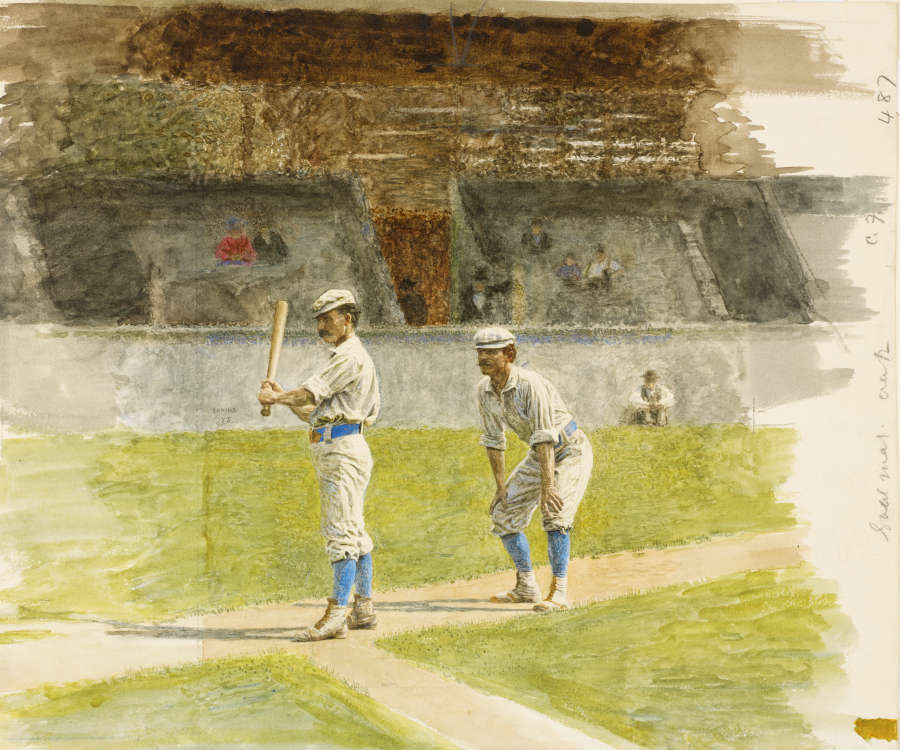
"Baseball Players Practicing" (1875) by Thomas Eakins depicts Fisler at bat at Jefferson Street Grounds

Fisler debuted on May 20, 1871, for Philadelphia. In his rookie year, he appeared in 28 games, driving in 16 runs and stealing 6 bases. In 1872, he recorded 48 RBI and had a batting average of .350. He hit his first career home run in 1873. Fisler is credited with both the first putout, and with scoring the first run in National League history on April 22, 1876.

Fisler played three more years with the Athletics and retired after the 1876 season. He retired with 414 career hits, two career home runs, and 189 RBIs in 273 games. In his career, Fisler played 124 games at first base, 120 games at second base, 35 games at outfield, and one at shortstop.

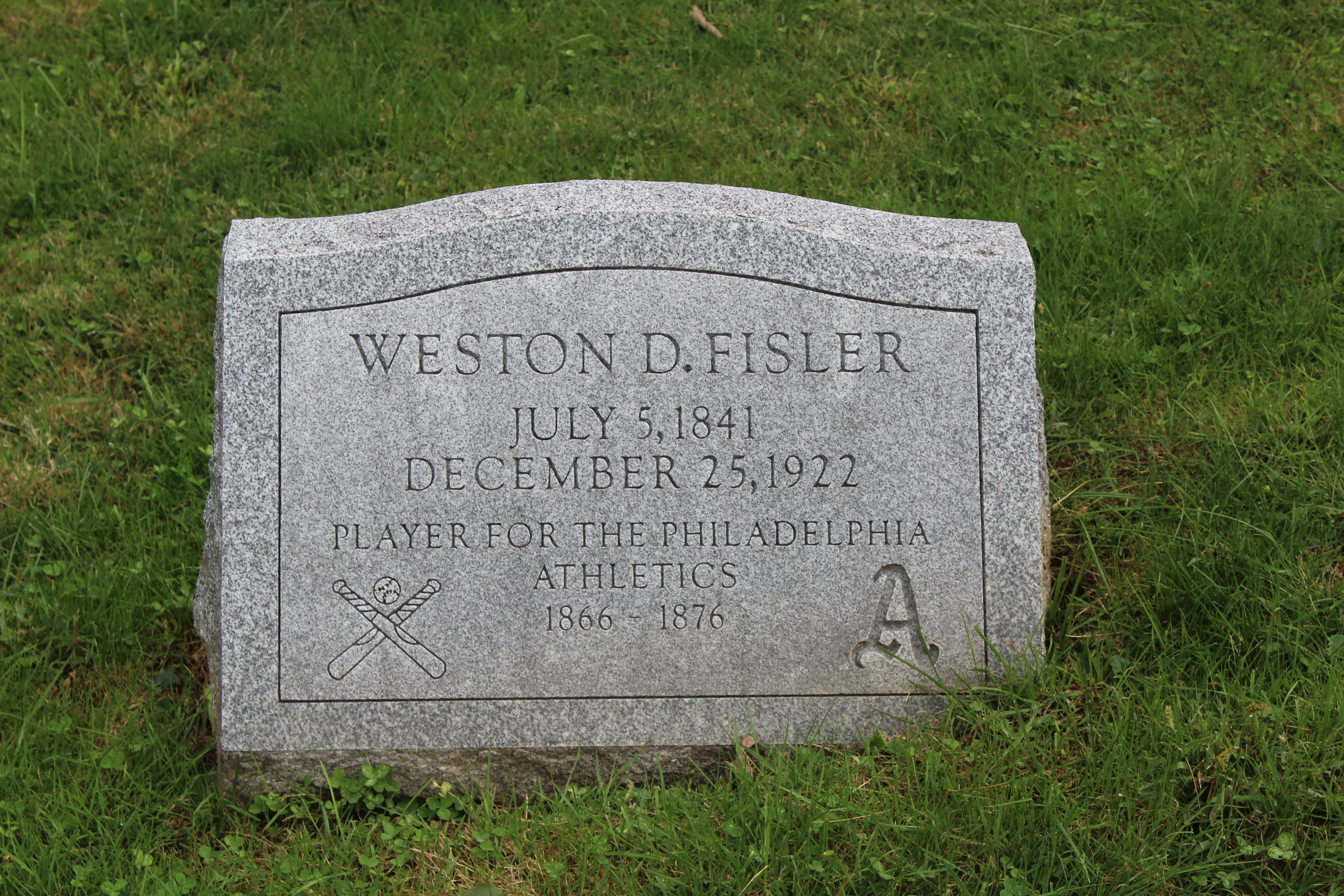
Wes Fisler gravestone in Laurel Hill Cemetery

Fisler died at age 81 on December 25, 1922, in Philadelphia, Pennsylvania and was interred at Laurel Hill Cemetery. His
