= Philadelphia Athletics (1860–1876) =

Professional baseball club in Philadelphia

Information
- League: National League (1876)
- Location: Philadelphia
- Ballpark: Jefferson Street Grounds
- Founded: 1860
- Folded: 1876
- Nickname: Athletic Base Ball Club of Philadelphia
- Pennant: 1871
- Former leagues: National Association (1871–1875); National Amateur Association (1861–1870)
- Colors: Navy, white
- Manager: Dick McBride (1871–1875); Cap Anson (1875); Al Wright (1876)

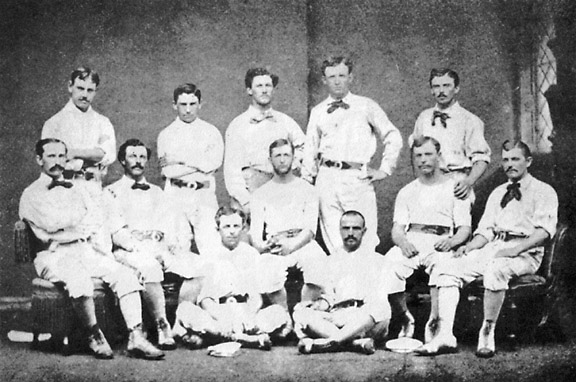
The 1874 Philadelphia Athletics

The Philadelphia Athletics, also known as the Athletic Base Ball Club of Philadelphia, was a prominent National Association, and later National League, professional baseball team that played in the second half of the 19th century.

== Founding and early success (1860–1875) ==
=== Early history ===
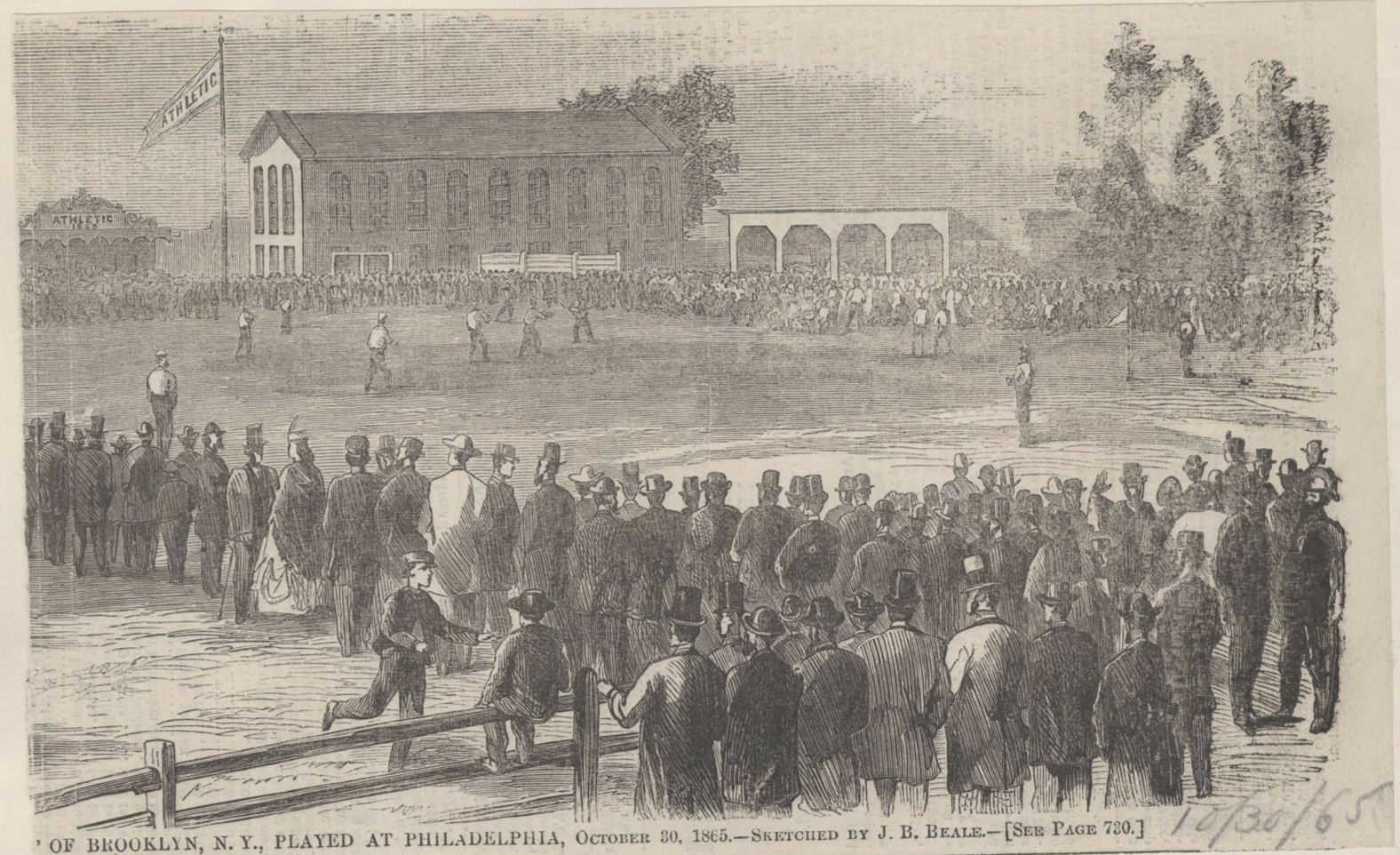
Atlantic defeats Athletic 21-15 on October 30, 1865 at 15th St/Columbia Ave in front of 12,000 spectators.

Philadelphia "had been a baseball town from the earliest days of the game", fielding amateur teams since at least the early 1830s. In 1860, James N. Kerns formed the Athletic Base Ball Club, which soon dominated amateur play in the area. Harper's Weekly chronicled a game between Athletic and Atlantic of Brooklyn for the baseball championship in 1866. A famous Harper's illustration shows the Athletic players in uniforms with the familiar blackletter "A" on front.

When newspapers developed stand-alone game scores and league standings, the club was termed Athletic with Base Ball Club being dropped in any case. In prose, the team was commonly called the Athletics, and it was later known as the Philadelphia Athletics.

=== National Association ===
The Athletics turned professional in the late 1860s and helped establish the first league, National Association of Professional Base Ball Players (NA), which began play in 1871. Their home field had been at 15th and Columbia, an otherwise unnamed venue informally called "the Athletic grounds." For 1871 they relocated to Jefferson Street Grounds, playing most of their home games there until being expelled from the major leagues after the 1876 season.

The Athletics were one of the most successful National Association teams, winning the first pennant with a record of 21 wins and 7 losses (.750), two games ahead of the Boston Red Stockings and Chicago White Stockings. The race was actually even closer; the primary official criterion then was neither games nor winning percentage, but wins, and the three clubs finished in the order given with 21, 20, and 19 victories. In the final game of the season, played on October 30 in Brooklyn, the Athletic defeat Chicago, 4–1, clinching the title. Chicago had become a road team following the Great Chicago Fire. Nate Berkenstock, a 40-year-old amateur who played right field for Philadelphia that day due to injuries, made his only big-league appearance in the game.

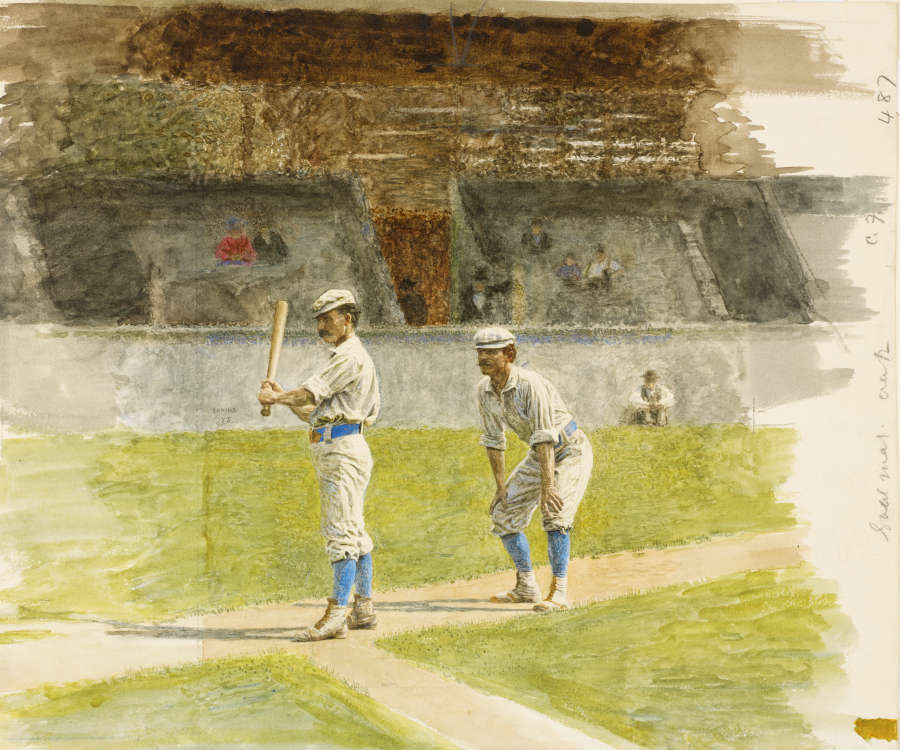
"Baseball Players Practicing" (1875) by Thomas Eakins depicting Athletic's Wes Fisler at bat at Jefferson Street Grounds

While Boston dominated the NA, winning the other four pennants, the Athletics and New York Mutuals also fielded teams every year, with Philadelphia winning a few more games overall but never challenging Boston.

Dick McBride served as regular pitcher for more than a decade and as captain throughout the NA seasons, which gives him manager credit today. Other star players include Al Reach in the 1860s and Cap Anson, who played from 1872 to 1875. At the very end of the 1875 season, Anson took over as the team's captain.

The Athletics also played one game in Dover, Delaware on June 24, 1875. They played at Fairview Park Fair Grounds.

During their five-year existence the Athletics won 165 games and lost only 86 for a winning percentage of .657. Notable players on their roster included Hall of Famer Cap Anson, infielder Ezra Sutton, and pitcher and manager Dick McBride.

=== National League (1876) ===
During the summer of 1875, the Chicago White Stockings moved decisively to improve its team by recruiting six stars then playing in Boston and Philadelphia. Four Red Stockings players, catcher Deacon White, infielders Cal McVey and Ross Barnes, and pitcher Al Spalding, and Philadelphia Athletics third baseman Cap Anson played for Chicago in 1876, with Ezra Sutton remaining in Philadelphia for the Athletics' final season.

Chicago's William Hulbert, assisted by player Albert Spalding and sportswriter Lewis Meacham, moved at the same time to organize a new league. Hulbert recruited first the St. Louis Brown Stockings of the National Association, independent clubs from Louisville and Cincinnati, the Louisville Grays and Cincinnati Reds, and four eastern clubs: the Athletics, the New York Mutuals, the Hartford Dark Blues, and the Boston Red Stockings. Three NA clubs still in business were excluded: the Philadelphia Whites, Brooklyn Atlantics, and the New Haven Elm Citys. The Athletics and Mutuals were selected rather than the Whites and Atlantics, as the new National League of Professional Base Ball Clubs granted exclusive territories to all member clubs. New Haven was too small a city and the club had declined to travel west in 1875, playing only three home games apiece with Chicago and St. Louis.

On Saturday, April 22, 1876, the Athletics played in the first game in the history of Major League Baseball, losing to the Boston Red Caps, 6–5.

After having spent 15 years as a strong and stable club, the Athletics fared poorly in the new National League of Professional Base Ball Clubs, finishing seventh with 14 wins in 60 games, 38 wins behind Chicago. Near the end of the season, the financially troubled team refused to make a western road trip, finishing with 35 games played at home and 25 away.

Mutual of New York also refused, owing the western teams nine home games. Both clubs were expelled from the National League, which simply contracted from eight to six for the 1877 season.

The 1876 Athletics were managed by Al Wright and played their home games at the Jefferson Street Grounds. Their top-hitting regular was left fielder George Hall, who batted .366 with a slugging percentage of .545. Another strong batter on the team was third baseman Levi Meyerle, who hit .340. The best pitcher on the team was Lon Knight, who won 10 games, lost 22, and had an ERA of 2.62.

== Record ==
Year	W	L	T	Games	Rank in games (in wins)
1861	2	2		4	14
1862	1	1		2	non-member
1863	7	5		12	2 (4th in wins)
1864	8	1		9	10 (tie 3rd)
1865	15	3		18	2 (2nd)
1866	23	2		25	2 (2nd)
1867	44	3		47	1 (1st)
1868	47	3		50	2 (tie 1st)
1869	45	8		53	3 (3rd)
1870	65	11	1	77	2 (tie 3rd in wins)

Championship matches with professional teams (1869–1870) and with professional leagues (1871–1876)

Year	W	L	T	Games	Rank in games (in wins)
1869	15	7		22	3 (tie 2nd in wins)
1870	26	11	1	38	2 (3rd)
1871	21	7		28	6 (1st place)
1872	30	14	3	47	4 (4th place)
1873	28	23	1	52	6 (5th place)
1874	33	22		55	6 (3rd place)
1875	53	20	4	77	3 (3rd place)
1876	14	45	1	60	7 (7th place)

Source for season records: Wright (2000) has published records for dozens of NABBP teams each season, relying on a mix of game and season records in contemporary newspapers and guides. Dozens of leading clubs by number of matches are included, as are many others. The records do not consistently cover either all games played or all championship matches between NABBP members.

== See also ==
- 1871 Philadelphia Athletics season
- 1872 Philadelphia Athletics season
- 1873 Philadelphia Athletics season
- 1874 Philadelphia Athletics season
- 1875 Philadelphia Athletics season
- 1876 Philadelphia Athletics season
- Athletic Base Ball Club of Philadelphia
