= 1873 Elizabeth Resolutes season =

1873 Elizabeth Resolutes
- League: National Association of Professional Base Ball Players
- Ballpark: Waverly Fairgrounds
- City: Elizabeth, New Jersey
- Record: 2–21 (.087)
- League place: 8th
- Manager: Doug Allison

The Elizabeth Resolutes played their first and only season in 1873 as a member of the United States National Association of Professional Base Ball Players. They finished eighth in the league with a record of 2–21. The team folded at the conclusion of the season.

== Regular season ==
=== Season standings ===
National Association	W	L	GB	Pct.
Boston Red Stockings	43	16	–	.729
Philadelphia White Stockings	36	17	4.0	.679
Baltimore Canaries	34	22	7.5	.607
New York Mutuals	29	24	11.0	.547
Philadelphia Athletics	28	23	11.0	.549
Brooklyn Atlantics	17	37	23.5	.205
Washington Blue Legs	8	31	25.0	.205
Elizabeth Resolutes	2	21	23.0	.087
Baltimore Marylands	0	6	16.5	.000

=== Record vs. opponents ===
1873 National Association Records Sources:
Team	BC	BM	BOS	BR	EL	NY	PHA	PWS	WSH
Baltimore Canaries	—	4–0	2–7–1	7–2	3–0	6–3	3–4	3–6	6–0
Baltimore Marylands	0–4	—	0–0	0–0	0–0	0–0	0–0	0–0	0–2
Boston	7–2–1	0–0	—	8–1	4–1	6–3	4–5	5–4	9–0
Brooklyn	2–7	0–0	1–8	—	3–1	2–7	4–5–1	2–7	3–2
Elizabeth	0–3	0–0	1–4	1–3	—	0–4	0–2	0–4	0–1
New York	3–6	0–0	3–6	7–2	4–0	—	4–5	4–4	4–1
Philadelphia Athletics	4–3	0–0	5–4	5–4–1	2–0	5–4	—	1–8	6–0
Philadelphia White Stockings	6–3	0–0	4–5	7–2	4–0	4–4	8–1	—	3–2
Washington	0–6	2–0	0–9	2–3	1–0	1–4	0–6	2–3	—

=== Roster ===
1873 Elizabeth Resolutes
Roster
Pitchers: Hugh Campbell; Len Lovett; Rynie Wolters; Catchers: Doug Allison; John Farrow	Infielders: Mike Campbell; Jim Clinton; William Crane; Frank Fleet; Ben Laughlin; Alexander Nevin; Marty Swandell; Favel Wordsworth	Outfielders: Art Allison; Henry Austin; Eddie Booth	Managers: Doug Allison

== Player stats ==
=== Batting ===
Note: G = Games played; AB = At bats; H = Hits; Avg. = Batting average; HR = Home runs; RBI = Runs batted in

Player	G	AB	H	Avg.	HR	RBI
Doug Allison	19	80	24	.300	0	8
Mike Campbell	21	84	12	.143	0	2
Ben Laughlin	12	51	12	.235	0	5
Favel Wordsworth	12	40	10	.250	0	3
Al Nevin	13	55	11	.200	0	1
Eddie Booth	18	74	21	.284	0	6
Henry Austin	23	101	25	.248	0	11
Art Allison	23	100	32	.320	0	11
Frank Fleet	22	89	23	.258	0	10
John Farrow	12	48	8	.167	0	3
Jim Clinton	9	39	9	.231	0	4
Marty Swandell	2	9	1	.111	0	1
William Crane	1	4	1	.250	0	1

=== Starting pitchers ===
Note: G = Games pitched; IP = Innings pitched; W = Wins; L = Losses; ERA = Earned run average; SO = Strikeouts

Player	G	IP	W	L	ERA	SO
Hugh Campbell	19	165.0	2	16	2.95	7
Frank Fleet	3	24.0	0	3	5.25	1
Len Lovett	1	9.0	0	1	7.00	1
Rynie Wolters	1	9.0	0	1	0.00	1
