= New York Mutuals all-time roster =

List of baseball players

The New York Mutuals baseball club, established 1859, played five seasons in the National Association, 1871–1875, and one in the National League, 1876. Here is a list of all their players in regular season games beginning 1871.

† Bold names identify members of the National Baseball Hall of Fame.

== A ==
- Doug Allison

== B ==
- Billy Barnie
- George Bechtel
- Steve Bellán
- Eddie Booth
- Bill Boyd
- Jack Burdock

== C ==
- Tom Carey
- Bill Craver
- Candy Cummings^{†}

== E ==
- Dave Eggler

== F ==
- George Fair
- Bob Ferguson
- Frank Fleet
- Davy Force
- Chick Fulmer

== G ==
- Count Gedney
- Billy Geer
- Joe Gerhardt

== H ==
- Jimmy Hallinan
- John Hatfield
- John Hayes
- George Heubel
- Nat Hicks
- Dick Higham
- Jim Holdsworth

== L ==
- Terry Larkin

== M ==
- John Maloney
- Phonney Martin
- Bobby Mathews
- Pat McGee
- John McGuinness
- John McMullin
- Al Metcalf
- Charlie Mills

== N ==
- Candy Nelson
- Al Nichols

== P ==
- Tom Patterson
- Dickey Pearce
- Nealy Phelps

== R ==
- Jack Remsen

== S ==
- George Seward
- Jim Shanley
- Orator Shaffer
- Charlie Smith
- Joe Start

== T ==
- Fred Treacey
- Pete Treacey

== V ==
- Bob Valentine

== W ==
- Billy West
- Rynie Wolters
