= 1873 Washington Blue Legs season =

1873 Washington Blue Legs
- League: National Association of Professional Base Ball Players
- Ballpark: Olympics Grounds
- City: Washington D.C.
- Record: 8–31 (.205)
- League place: 7th
- Manager: Nick Young

The Washington Blue Legs played their first and only season in 1873 as a member of the National Association of Professional Base Ball Players. They finished seventh in the league with a record of 8–31. It is uncertain if this team is the same franchise as either the 1872 Washington Nationals or the 1872 Washington Olympics. The Blue Legs' 1873 roster featured four players who started for the Washington Nationals in 1872--Paul Hines (LF), Holly Hollingshead (CF), Warren White (3B), and Oscar Bielaski (RF)--and two players who started for the Washington Olympics in 1872--Tommy Beals (2B) and John Glenn (C). Nick Young, who managed the Blue Legs in 1873, had managed the Olympics in 1872.

== Regular season ==
=== Season standings ===
National Association	W	L	GB	Pct.
Boston Red Stockings	43	16	–	.729
Philadelphia White Stockings	36	17	4.0	.679
Baltimore Canaries	34	22	7.5	.607
New York Mutuals	29	24	11.0	.547
Philadelphia Athletics	28	23	11.0	.549
Brooklyn Atlantics	17	37	23.5	.205
Washington Blue Legs	8	31	25.0	.205
Elizabeth Resolutes	2	21	23.0	.087
Baltimore Marylands	0	6	16.5	.000

=== Record vs. opponents ===
1873 National Association Records Sources:
Team	BC	BM	BOS	BR	EL	NY	PHA	PWS	WSH
Baltimore Canaries	—	4–0	2–7–1	7–2	3–0	6–3	3–4	3–6	6–0
Baltimore Marylands	0–4	—	0–0	0–0	0–0	0–0	0–0	0–0	0–2
Boston	7–2–1	0–0	—	8–1	4–1	6–3	4–5	5–4	9–0
Brooklyn	2–7	0–0	1–8	—	3–1	2–7	4–5–1	2–7	3–2
Elizabeth	0–3	0–0	1–4	1–3	—	0–4	0–2	0–4	0–1
New York	3–6	0–0	3–6	7–2	4–0	—	4–5	4–4	4–1
Philadelphia Athletics	4–3	0–0	5–4	5–4–1	2–0	5–4	—	1–8	6–0
Philadelphia White Stockings	6–3	0–0	4–5	7–2	4–0	4–4	8–1	—	3–2
Washington	0–6	2–0	0–9	2–3	1–0	1–4	0–6	2–3	—

=== Roster ===
1873 Washington Blue Legs
Roster
Pitchers: John Greason; Bill Stearns; Catchers: Pop Snyder	Infielders: Tommy Beals; John Donnelly; Joe Gerhardt; John Glenn; Bob Reach; Howard Wall; Fred Waterman; Warren White	Outfielders: Ed Atkinson; Oscar Bielaski; Paul Hines; Holly Hollingshead	Managers: Nick Young

== Player stats ==
=== Batting ===
Note: G = Games played; AB = At bats; H = Hits; Avg. = Batting average; HR = Home runs; RBI = Runs batted in

Player	G	AB	H	Avg.	HR	RBI
Pop Snyder	28	107	21	.196	0	3
John Glenn	39	186	49	.263	1	22
Tommy Beals	37	169	46	.272	0	22
John Donnelly	30	137	35	.255	0	19
Warren White	39	158	43	.272	0	20
Holly Hollingshead	30	136	35	.257	0	22
Paul Hines	39	181	60	.331	1	29
Oscar Bielaski	38	143	49	.283	0	20
Fred Waterman	15	80	28	.350	0	12
Joe Gerhardt	13	57	12	.211	0	9
Ed Atkinson	2	8	0	.000	0	0
Bob Reach	1	5	1	.200	0	0
Howard Wall	1	3	1	.333	0	0

=== Starting pitchers ===
Note: G = Games pitched; IP = Innings pitched; W = Wins; L = Losses; ERA = Earned run average; SO = Strikeouts

Player	G	IP	W	L	ERA	SO
Bill Stearns	32	283.0	7	25	4.61	5
John Greason	7	63.0	1	6	5.86	5
