= 1873 New York Mutuals season =

1873 New York Mutuals
- League: National Association of Professional Base Ball Players
- Ballpark: Union Grounds
- City: New York City
- Record: 29–24 (.547)
- League place: 4th
- Owners: William Cammeyer
- Managers: John Hatfield, Joe Start

The New York Mutuals baseball team was one of only three teams to have played in all five seasons of the National Association's existence (1871–75). In 1873, the team finished the season in fourth place with 29 wins and 24 losses, eleven games behind pennant-winning Boston Red Stockings. They won 22 out of 31 home games, played at Union Grounds in Brooklyn, and 7 of 22 away from home. The team batting average was .281, which is the fifth-best in the NA. They led the league in fewest strikeouts with 22 and fewest opponent runs.

== Regular season ==
=== Season standings ===
National Association	W	L	T	Pct.	GB
Boston Red Stockings	43	16	1	.725	—
Philadelphia White Stockings	36	17	—	.679	4
Baltimore Canaries	34	22	1	.605	7½
Philadelphia Athletics	28	23	1	.548	11
New York Mutuals	29	24	—	.547	11
Brooklyn Atlantics	17	37	1	.318	23½
Washington Blue Legs	8	31	—	.205	25
Elizabeth Resolutes	2	21	—	.087	23
Baltimore Marylands	0	6	—	.000	16½

=== Record vs. opponents ===
1873 National Association Records Sources:
Team	BC	BM	BOS	BR	EL	NY	PHA	PWS	WSH
Baltimore Canaries	—	4–0	2–7–1	7–2	3–0	6–3	3–4	3–6	6–0
Baltimore Marylands	0–4	—	0–0	0–0	0–0	0–0	0–0	0–0	0–2
Boston	7–2–1	0–0	—	8–1	4–1	6–3	4–5	5–4	9–0
Brooklyn	2–7	0–0	1–8	—	3–1	2–7	4–5–1	2–7	3–2
Elizabeth	0–3	0–0	1–4	1–3	—	0–4	0–2	0–4	0–1
New York	3–6	0–0	3–6	7–2	4–0	—	4–5	4–4	4–1
Philadelphia Athletics	4–3	0–0	5–4	5–4–1	2–0	5–4	—	1–8	6–0
Philadelphia White Stockings	6–3	0–0	4–5	7–2	4–0	4–4	8–1	—	3–2
Washington	0–6	2–0	0–9	2–3	1–0	1–4	0–6	2–3	—

=== Roster ===
1873 New York Mutuals
Roster
Pitchers: Bobby Mathews	Catchers: Doug Allison; Nat Hicks; Infielders: Steve Bellán; John Hatfield; Jim Holdsworth; Candy Nelson; Joe Start	Outfielders: Dave Eggler; Count Gedney; Dick Higham; Phonney Martin; Nealy Phelps	Manager: John Hatfield; Joe Start

Starting pitcher Bobby Mathews went 29-23 as a starter with 47 complete games. In those complete games, Mathews pitched two shutouts. Candy Cummings was the NA's best pitcher in 1872, but decided to go to the Baltimore Canaries, Mathews' former team. And fill-in he did, coming in 3rd in wins, 5th in winning percentage, 3rd in complete games, 1st in strikeouts, 3rd in games pitched, 2nd in base-runners per 9 innings pitched, 4th in innings pitched, 2nd in opponents' average, 2nd in opponents' on-base percentage, 2nd in earned run average, 2nd in adjusted earned run average, first in adjusted starter runs, and second in pitcher wins; placing higher than Cummings in all but one of those categories.

Nat Hicks, catcher: Played in 28 games played, all catching. Batted .242 in 120 at bats.

Joe Start, first baseman, Started his career in 1860 in New York at the age of 18. Start is credited with being the 1st first baseman to play away from the bag. He had the best fielding average for a first baseman in 1873. With 25 games remaining, the Mutuals voted Start to be the manager and he managed the team to a record of 18-7. Start hit .266 in 1873.

Jim Holdsworth, shortstop: Batted .323 with 28 RBIs in all 53 games for the Mutuals. Holdsworth was tied for third in the NA with eight triples.

John Hatfield, third baseman: Batting .306 with two home runs and 46 RBIs. He was the manager of the team for the first 28 games, leading the team to an 11-17 mark. Hatfield played in all but one game in 1873.

Count Gedney, left fielder: Batted .267 with a home run and 24 RBIs in all 53 games for the Mutuals.

Dave Eggler, center fielder: Batted a .338 with 35 runs batted in and two strikeouts at the plate. He had 266 at bats, striking out once every 133 at bats. He played in every game in the 1873 season for the Mutuals. He was fourth in the NA with 82 runs scored and fifth in fielding runs-outfield.

Phonney Martin, right fielder/pitcher. He batted .221 with 14 runs batted in. He pitched in six games, and lost his only start. Martin compiled a 3.44 earned run average and opponents hit .292 against him.

Dick Higham, utility player: Higham batted .316 with 34 runs batted in 49 games. He only struck out once in 244 at bats.

Bobby Mathews batted .193 with 14 runs batted in 223 at bats in 52 games. When Mathews wasn't pitching, he would play in right field for reliever Phonney Martin.

== Player stats ==
=== Batting ===
Note: Pos = Position; G = Games played; AB = At bats; H = Hits; Avg. = Batting average; HR = Home runs; RBI = Runs batted in

Player	Pos	G	AB	H	Avg.	HR	RBI
Nat Hicks	C	28	120	29	.242	1	14
Joe Start	1B	53	252	67	.266	1	29
Candy Nelson	2B	36	168	55	.327	0	22
Jim Holdsworth	SS	53	232	75	.323	0	28
John Hatfield	3B	52	255	78	.306	2	46
Dave Eggler	OF	53	266	90	.338	0	35
Count Gedney	OF	53	225	60	.267	1	24
Phonney Martin	OF	31	140	31	.221	0	14
Dick Higham	UT	49	244	77	.316	0	34
Doug Allison	C	11	48	10	.208	0	3
Steve Bellan	3B	8	32	7	.219	0	3
Nealy Phelps	UT	1	6	0	.000	0	0
Bobby Mathews	P	52	223	43	.193	0	14

=== Starting pitchers ===
Note: G = Games pitched; IP = Innings pitched; W = Wins; L = Losses; ERA = Earned run average; SO = Strikeouts

Player	G	IP	W	L	ERA	SO
Bobby Mathews	52	443.0	29	23	2.58	79

=== Relief pitchers ===
Note: G = Games pitched; W = Wins; L = Losses; SV = Saves; ERA = Earned run average; SO = Strikeouts

Player	G	W	L	SV	ERA	SO
Phonney Martin	6	0	1	0	3.44	1
