= 1873 Boston Red Stockings season =

1873 Boston Red Stockings
- National Association Champion
- League: National Association of Professional Base Ball Players
- Ballpark: South End Grounds
- City: Boston, Massachusetts
- Record: 43–16 (.729)
- League place: 1st
- Owner: Charles H. Porter
- Manager: Harry Wright

The 1873 Boston Red Stockings season was the third season of the franchise. They won their second consecutive National Association championship.

Managed by Harry Wright, Boston finished with a record of 43–16 to win the pennant by 4 games. Pitcher Al Spalding started 54 of the Red Stockings' games and led the NA with 41 wins. Second baseman Ross Barnes won the league batting title with a .431 batting average, and catcher Deacon White topped the circuit with 77 runs batted in.

Harry Wright, Al Spalding, first baseman Jim O'Rourke, and shortstop George Wright have all been elected into the Baseball Hall of Fame.

== Regular season ==
=== Season standings ===
National Association	W	L	T	Pct.	GB
Boston Red Stockings	43	16	1	.725	—
Philadelphia White Stockings	36	17	—	.679	4
Baltimore Canaries	34	22	1	.605	7½
Philadelphia Athletics	28	23	1	.548	11
New York Mutuals	29	24	—	.547	11
Brooklyn Atlantics	17	37	1	.318	23½
Washington Blue Legs	8	31	—	.205	25
Elizabeth Resolutes	2	21	—	.087	23
Baltimore Marylands	0	6	—	.000	16½

=== Record vs. opponents ===
1873 National Association Records Sources:
Team	BC	BM	BOS	BR	EL	NY	PHA	PWS	WSH
Baltimore Canaries	—	4–0	2–7–1	7–2	3–0	6–3	3–4	3–6	6–0
Baltimore Marylands	0–4	—	0–0	0–0	0–0	0–0	0–0	0–0	0–2
Boston	7–2–1	0–0	—	8–1	4–1	6–3	4–5	5–4	9–0
Brooklyn	2–7	0–0	1–8	—	3–1	2–7	4–5–1	2–7	3–2
Elizabeth	0–3	0–0	1–4	1–3	—	0–4	0–2	0–4	0–1
New York	3–6	0–0	3–6	7–2	4–0	—	4–5	4–4	4–1
Philadelphia Athletics	4–3	0–0	5–4	5–4–1	2–0	5–4	—	1–8	6–0
Philadelphia White Stockings	6–3	0–0	4–5	7–2	4–0	4–4	8–1	—	3–2
Washington	0–6	2–0	0–9	2–3	1–0	1–4	0–6	2–3	—

=== Roster ===
1873 Boston Red Stockings
Roster
Pitchers: Al Spalding; Harry Wright; Catchers: Deacon White	Infielders: Ross Barnes; Jack Manning; Jim O'Rourke; Harry Schafer; Charlie Sweasy; George Wright	Outfielders: Bob Addy; Dave Birdsall; Andy Leonard; Fraley Rogers; Harry Wright	Manager: Harry Wright

== Player stats ==
=== Batting ===
==== Starters by position ====
Note: Pos = Position; G = Games played; AB = At bats; H = Hits; Avg. = Batting average; HR = Home runs; RBI = Runs batted in

Pos	Player	G	AB	H	Avg.	HR	RBI
C	Deacon White	60	311	122	.392	1	77
1B	Jim O'Rourke	57	280	98	.350	1	49
2B	Ross Barnes	60	320	138	.431	2	60
SS	George Wright	59	323	125	.387	3	43
3B	Harry Schafer	60	296	79	.267	2	42
OF	Bob Addy	31	152	54	.355	1	32
OF	Harry Wright	58	263	38	.259	2	36
OF	Andy Leonard	58	300	96	.320	0	60

==== Other batters ====
Note: G = Games played; AB = At bats; H = Hits; Avg. = Batting average; HR = Home runs; RBI = Runs batted in

Player	G	AB	H	Avg.	HR	RBI
Jack Manning	31	154	41	.266	0	21
Dave Birdsall	3	11	1	.091	0	0
Fraley Rogers	2	11	4	.364	0	3
Charlie Sweasy	1	4	1	.250	0	0

=== Pitching ===
==== Starting pitchers ====
Note: G = Games pitched; IP = Innings pitched; W = Wins; L = Losses; ERA = Earned run average; SO = Strikeouts

Player	G	IP	W	L	ERA	SO
Al Spalding	60	496.2	41	14	2.99	50

==== Relief pitchers ====
Note: G = Games pitched; IP = Innings pitched; W = Wins; L = Losses; ERA = Earned run average; SO = Strikeouts

Player	G	IP	W	L	ERA	SO
Harry Wright	14	39.1	2	2	4.12	5

Preceded by Boston Red Stockings; 1872	National Association of Professional Base Ball Players Championship Season; 1873	Succeeded by Boston Red Stockings; 1874
