= 1873 Brooklyn Atlantics season =

1873 Brooklyn Atlantics
- League: National Association of Professional Base Ball Players
- Ballpark: Union Grounds
- City: Brooklyn, New York
- Record: 17–37 (.315)
- League place: 6th
- Manager: Bob Ferguson

The Brooklyn Atlantics played in 1873 as a member of the National Association of Professional Base Ball Players. They finished sixth in the league with a record of 17–37.

== Regular season ==
=== Season standings ===
National Association	W	L	T	Pct.	GB
Boston Red Stockings	43	16	1	.725	—
Philadelphia White Stockings	36	17	—	.679	4
Baltimore Canaries	34	22	1	.605	7½
Philadelphia Athletics	28	23	1	.548	11
New York Mutuals	29	24	—	.547	11
Brooklyn Atlantics	17	37	1	.318	23½
Washington Blue Legs	8	31	—	.205	25
Elizabeth Resolutes	2	21	—	.087	23
Baltimore Marylands	0	6	—	.000	16½

=== Record vs. opponents ===
1873 National Association Records Sources:
Team	BC	BM	BOS	BR	EL	NY	PHA	PWS	WSH
Baltimore Canaries	—	4–0	2–7–1	7–2	3–0	6–3	3–4	3–6	6–0
Baltimore Marylands	0–4	—	0–0	0–0	0–0	0–0	0–0	0–0	0–2
Boston	7–2–1	0–0	—	8–1	4–1	6–3	4–5	5–4	9–0
Brooklyn	2–7	0–0	1–8	—	3–1	2–7	4–5–1	2–7	3–2
Elizabeth	0–3	0–0	1–4	1–3	—	0–4	0–2	0–4	0–1
New York	3–6	0–0	3–6	7–2	4–0	—	4–5	4–4	4–1
Philadelphia Athletics	4–3	0–0	5–4	5–4–1	2–0	5–4	—	1–8	6–0
Philadelphia White Stockings	6–3	0–0	4–5	7–2	4–0	4–4	8–1	—	3–2
Washington	0–6	2–0	0–9	2–3	1–0	1–4	0–6	2–3	—

=== Roster ===
1873 Brooklyn Atlantics
Roster
Pitchers: Jim Britt; Catchers: Tom Barlow	Infielders: Jack Burdock; Herman Dehlman; Bob Ferguson; Henry Kessler; Dickey Pearce	Outfielders: Eddie Booth; Bill Boyd; Herm Doscher; Charlie Pabor; Jack Remsen	Managers: Bob Ferguson

== Player stats ==
=== Batting ===
Note: G = Games played; AB = At bats; H = Hits; Avg. = Batting average; HR = Home runs; RBI = Runs batted in

Player	G	AB	H	Avg.	HR	RBI
Tom Barlow	55	269	74	.275	1	12
Herman Dehlman	54	219	52	.237	0	18
Jack Burdock	55	245	62	.253	2	36
Dickey Pearce	55	262	72	.275	1	23
Bob Ferguson	51	228	59	.259	0	25
Jack Remsen	50	207	61	.295	1	29
Bill Boyd	48	228	63	.276	1	30
Charlie Pabor	55	228	82	.360	0	41
Eddie Booth	16	70	14	.200	0	7
Herm Doscher	1	6	1	.167	0	1
Henry Kessler	1	5	1	.200	0	1

=== Starting pitchers ===
Note: G = Games pitched; IP = Innings pitched; W = Wins; L = Losses; ERA = Earned run average; SO = Strikeouts

Player	G	IP	W	L	ERA	SO
Jim Britt	54	480.2	17	36	4.08	16

==== Relief pitchers ====
Note: G = Games pitched; W = Wins; L = Losses; SV = Saves; ERA = Earned run average

Player	G	W	L	SV	ERA	SO
Bob Ferguson	4	0	1	0	5.59	0
