= Marty Swandell =

German-American baseball player (1841–1906)

- Third baseman
- Born: July 1841; Grand Duchy of Baden
- Died: October 25, 1906 (aged 65); Brooklyn, New York, U.S.
- Batted: Left Threw: Left

MLB debut
- May 7, 1872, for the Brooklyn Eckfords

Last MLB appearance
- August 7, 1873, for the Elizabeth Resolutes

MLB statistics
- Batting average: .188
- Runs: 9
- Runs batted in: 5
- Stats at Baseball Reference

Teams
- National Association of Base Ball Players: Eckford of Brooklyn (1863–1867); Mutual of New York (1868–1870); National Association of Professional BBP: Eckford of Brooklyn (1872); Elizabeth Resolutes (1873)

John Martin Swandell (July 1841 – October 25, 1906) was a German–American baseball player and umpire. He spent parts of two seasons as a player in the National Association (NA), a professional league, and also had an eight-year career in the National Association of Base Ball Players (NABBP), a league with amateur status, between 1863 and 1870.

== Early life and amateur career ==
Swandell was born Martin Schwendel in the Grand Duchy of Baden in July 1841; the exact day of his birth is unknown. He emigrated to Brooklyn sometime before 1863, the year he joined the Eckford team in the NABBP. That year, Eckford went 10-0 and won the NABBP championship, while Swandell was the league's top hitter by averaging four hits per game.

Swandell remained with Eckford until 1867, following which he joined the Mutual of New York side for three years. He returned to the Eckford club in 1871, and subsequently remained with them when they joined the NA in 1872.

== National Association career ==
Prior to the Eckford side joining the NA, Swandell umpired two games in the league in 1871; one of them was the decisive final game of the year between Athletic of Philadelphia and the Chicago White Stockings that determined the league champion.

Swandell was the oldest member of the Eckfords during their 1872 season in the NA and one of the oldest in the league overall. He appeared in 14 games for the team, appearing in multiple games at third base and center field, while also starting games at first and second base. As a batter, he had 12 hits in 52 at-bats for a .231 average, nearly matching the team's average of .232. Swandell struggled defensively, recording 17 errors in six games at third and eight errors in five games in center; his fielding percentage was far below the league averages at the position. While with the Eckfords, Swandell umpired nine games away from Brooklyn, mostly those featuring the New York Mutuals.

With the Eckfords folding after a 3-26 season, Swandell joined the new Elizabeth Resolutes for 1873. Swandell appeared in two games for the Resolutes, who did little better by going 2-21, and went one-for-nine (.111) at the plate while making two errors in the field. These were his last as a player, but he stayed active in the NA as an umpire, working fifteen games in 1873 and two more in 1874.

== Post-baseball career ==
By 1880, Swandell had left baseball to run a Brooklyn bakery. According to census records and city directories of the era, he still ran the bakery in 1890, and had also returned to using Schwendel, his surname of birth. He continued to live in Brooklyn up until his death on October 25, 1906.
