= Fred Waterman =

American baseball player (1845–1899)

- Third baseman
- Born: December 1845; New York City, US
- Died: December 16, 1899 (aged 53–54); Cincinnati, Ohio, US
- Batted: Unknown Threw: Unknown

MLB debut
- May 5, 1871, for the Washington Olympics

Last MLB appearance
- September 23, 1875, for the Chicago White Stockings

MLB statistics
- Batting average: .333
- Runs: 81
- Runs batted in: 38
- Stats at Baseball Reference

Teams
- National Association of Base Ball Players Empire of New York (1865) New York Mutuals (1866–1867) Cincinnati Red Stockings (1868–1870) League player Washington Olympics (1871–1872) Washington Blue Legs (1873) Chicago White Stockings (1875) League manager Washington Olympics (1872)

Career highlights and awards
- Member of the 1869 undefeated Cincinnati Red Stockings

Frederick A. Waterman (December 1845 – December 16, 1899) was an American baseball player who played third base for the original Cincinnati Red Stockings, the first fully professional baseball team. Throughout his career with "major" teams, amateur and pro, third base was his regular position in the field.

Born 1845 in New York City, Waterman played for the Empire club of his native city in 1865 and for the famous Mutual club (New York Mutuals) the next two years. Some Mutuals players were compensated materially during the amateur era of National Association of Base Ball Players—city employment is one possibility—and Waterman may be considered a candidate.

== Cincinnati ==
At age 22 Waterman moved to Cincinnati for the 1868 season and played for the original Cincinnati Red Stockings managed by Harry Wright. Open professionalism was one year away but the long move suggests that Waterman was somehow compensated by club members if not by the club. Cincinnati fielded a strong team that year, with five of the famous team already in place. Playing statistics suggest that Waterman was the second best batsman behind John Hatfield, another import from the Mutuals, for he was second on the team both in scoring 4.4 runs per game and in being put out only 2.3 times per game.

When the NABBP permitted professionalism, the Red Stockings hired five incumbents including Waterman and five new men to complete its famous First Nine of 1869, the first team on salary for a season. A few others had previously played some third base (all played at the six infield positions in 1868), but Wright retained Waterman at the position.

Cincinnati toured the continent undefeated in 1869 and may have been the strongest team in 1870, but the club dropped professional base ball after the second season.

== 1871 ==
Harry Wright was hired to organize a new team in Boston, where he signed three teammates for 1871. The other five regulars including Fred Waterman signed with Nick Young's Washington Olympics, an established club that also joined the new, entirely professional National Association (NA).

The Olympics appointed as captain another transplant, Charlie Sweasy, but he missed two long stretches of the season with illness. Waterman served one stretch as acting captain and so earned his manager's credit in some accounts.

The five former Red Stockings led the Olympics to a respectable finish in the inaugural NA season, but Waterman was left practically alone in the role one year later. He dominated the team at bat, while it failed miserably and dropped out after nine games. He was not picked up by another NA team, perhaps because four others of the eleven entrants went out of business during the season, but playing for a second team was a novelty that year. Probably he remained in Washington, for his major league career resumed when a new team from that city entered for 1873. He was a leading batsman again, now one of two on the team with Paul Hines, but he played only 15 of 39 games, more at shortstop than anywhere else, as captain Warren White manned third.

There were eight teams in the NA field for 1874 and Fred Waterman was not a member. His known professional career ended with five of 69 games for Chicago in 1875. He was 29 years old and still better than league-average as a batter by his meager statistical record.

Waterman died 1899 in Cincinnati at age 54. He is buried in Wesleyan Cemetery in that city.
