= Alexander Nevin =

American baseball player (1850–1921)

- Third Baseman
- Born: October 3, 1850; Allegheny City, Pennsylvania, U.S.
- Died: October 10, 1921 (aged 71); Pensacola, Florida, U.S.
- Batted: Unknown Threw: Unknown

MLB debut
- May 6, 1873, for the Elizabeth Resolutes

Last MLB appearance
- July 23, 1873, for the Elizabeth Resolutes

MLB statistics
- Batting average: .208
- Home runs: 0
- RBIs: 2
- Stats at Baseball Reference

Teams
- Elizabeth Resolutes (1873)

Alexander Brown Nevin (October 3, 1850 – October 10, 1921) was a 19th-century American Major League Baseball player.

== Sources ==
- Career statistics from Baseball Reference · Retrosheet
