= Phonney Martin =

American baseball player (1845–1933)

Alphonse Martin
- Right fielder/Pitcher
- Born: August 4, 1845; New York, New York, U.S.
- Died: May 24, 1933 (aged 87); Hollis, New York, U.S.
- Batted: Unknown Threw: Unknown

MLB debut
- April 26, 1872, for the Troy Haymakers

Last MLB appearance
- October 21, 1873, for the New York Mutuals

MLB statistics
- Batting average: .243
- Runs: 52
- Runs batted in: 37
- Win–loss record: 3–10
- Earned run average: 4.03
- Stats at Baseball Reference

Teams
- National Association of Base Ball Players Empire of New York (1864–1865) New York Mutuals (1866–1867, 1870) Brooklyn Eckfords (1868–1869) League player Troy Haymakers (1872) Brooklyn Eckfords (1872) New York Mutuals (1873) League manager Brooklyn Eckfords (1872)

Alphonse Case "Phonney" Martin (August 4, 1845 – May 24, 1933) was an American professional baseball right fielder and pitcher who played two seasons in the National Association from 1872 to 1873.

== Career ==
Martin, born in New York City, was an American Civil War veteran who played in organized baseball as far back as 1869, when he pitched for the Brooklyn Eckfords. That year, a reporter for the New York Clipper described him as an "extremely hard pitcher to hit for the ball never comes in a straight line‚ but in a tantalizing curve." If the observation is true, this would pre-date Candy Cummings, the pitcher given credit as the inventor of the curveball. His pitching style led to his nickname of "Old Slow Ball".

Martin officially began his professional baseball career when he joined the 1872 Troy Haymakers of the National Association as a pitcher and right fielder, playing in 25 games, pitching in eight of those games. Later in the season, he returned to the Eckfords, now also in the Association, and played in the same pitcher/outfielder role for 18 games. That year, he is given credit for managing the Eckfords for nine games, with a record of 1 win and 8 losses. There is some dispute about this, as SABR and retrosheet.org list Andy Allison, Jimmy Wood, and Martin as managing the team that year, while baseball-reference.com lists Jim Clinton and Wood as the managers. For the 1873 season, he joined the New York Mutuals, which turned out to be his last season at this level. He played 30 games in right field, and pitched six games.

== Death ==
Martin died in Hollis, New York at the age of 87, and is interred at Cypress Hills National Cemetery in Brooklyn, New York.

Records
Preceded by Harry Berthrong	Oldest recognized verified living baseball player April 24, 1928 – May 24, 1933	Succeeded by Harry Schafer
