= Henry Austin (baseball) =

American baseball player (1844–1904)

- Outfielder
- Born: October 1844; New York, U.S.
- Died: November 2, 1904 (aged 60); Amityville, New York, U.S.
- Batted: Unknown Threw: Unknown

Major-league debut
- April 28, 1873, for the Elizabeth Resolutes

Last major-league appearance
- August 7, 1873, for the Elizabeth Resolutes

Major-league statistics
- Batting average: .248
- Home runs: 0
- RBIs: 11
- Stats at Baseball Reference

Teams
- National Association of Base Ball Players Union of Morrisania (1865–1870) National Association of Professional BBP Elizabeth Resolutes (1873)

Henry C. Austin (October 1844 – November 2, 1904) was an American amateur and professional baseball outfielder who played in the major leagues in 1873 for the Elizabeth Resolutes of the National Association.

== Baseball career ==
Austin played for the Unions of Morrisania in the late 1860s, including their 1867 championship team.

In his only major-league season, Austin played in all 23 games for the 2–21 Resolutes. He led the team with 101 at bats and tied for the team lead with 11 RBI. He had 25 hits, a batting average of .248, and scored 10 runs. Playing center field and right field, he made 15 errors in 54 total chances for a fielding percentage of .722, well below the league average of .805 for outfielders.

After the Elizabeth club left the major leagues, he continued to play with them until his mid-30s.

== Personal life ==
Austin served as Police Commissioner of Elizabeth, New Jersey, after his playing years.

Austin died at the age of 60 in Amityville, New York. He served in the 82nd and 59th New York Infantry Regiments during the American Civil War.
