= Eddie Booth =

American baseball player

- Right fielder
- Born: Unknown; Brooklyn, New York, U.S.
- Died: Unknown
- Batted: Unknown Threw: Unknown

Major-league debut
- April 26, 1872, for the Middletown Mansfields

Last major-league appearance
- October 17, 1876, for the New York Mutuals

Major-league statistics
- Batting average: .239
- Hits: 243
- Runs batted in: 76
- Stats at Baseball Reference

Teams
- Middletown Mansfields (1872); Brooklyn Atlantics (1872); Elizabeth Resolutes (1873); Brooklyn Atlantics (1873–1874); New York Mutuals (1875–1876)

Edward H. Booth was an American professional baseball player who played for four teams during his five-year major-league career.

== Personal life ==
There is nothing concrete about when he was born or died, but Peter Morris indicates that there is a possible match, a strong candidate who died in New York City on December 21, 1928, hasn't been able to prove that he’s the same man.
