= Len Lovett =

American baseball player (1852–1922)

- Outfielder
- Born: July 17, 1852; Lancaster County, Pennsylvania
- Died: November 18, 1922 (aged 70); Newark, Delaware
- Batted: Right Threw: Right

MLB debut
- August 4, 1873, for the Elizabeth Resolutes

Last MLB appearance
- May 19, 1875, for the Philadelphia Centennials

MLB statistics
- Batting average: .269
- Home runs: 0
- RBIs: 3
- Stats at Baseball Reference

Teams
- Elizabeth Resolutes (1873); Philadelphia Centennials (1875)

Leonard Walker Lovett (July 17, 1852 in Lancaster County, Pennsylvania – November 18, 1922 in Newark, Delaware) was a 19th-century baseball player who played in one game in 1873 as a pitcher and six games in 1875 as an outfielder in Major League Baseball.

== Sources ==
- Career statistics from Baseball Reference · Retrosheet
