= Ben Laughlin (baseball) =

American baseball player

- Second baseman
- Batted: Unknown Threw: Unknown

MLB debut
- April 28, 1873, for the Elizabeth Resolutes

Last MLB appearance
- August 7, 1873, for the Elizabeth Resolutes

MLB statistics
- Batting average: .240
- Home runs: 0
- RBIs: 6
- Stats at Baseball Reference

Teams
- Elizabeth Resolutes (1873)

Ben Laughlin played second base for the Elizabeth Resolutes, a 19th-century Major League Baseball team.

== Sources ==
- Career statistics from Baseball Reference · Baseball Reference (Minors) · Retrosheet
