= Ham Allen =

American baseball player (1846–1881)

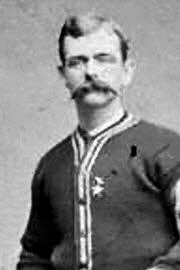
- Outfielder / Shortstop
- Born: April 20, 1846; Augusta, Maine, U.S.
- Died: February 6, 1881 (aged 34); Natick, Massachusetts, U.S.
- Batted: Unknown Threw: Unknown

MLB debut
- April 27, 1872, for the Middletown Mansfields

Last MLB appearance
- August 9, 1872, for the Middletown Mansfields

MLB statistics
- Games played: 17
- Batting average: .271
- Hits: 19
- Stats at Baseball Reference

Teams
- Middletown Mansfields (1872)

Frank Erwin "Ham" Allen (April 20, 1846 – February 6, 1881) was an American professional baseball player who played as an outfielder and a shortstop during the 1872 season for the Middletown Mansfields in the National Association.

Allen served as a private in Company F of the 36th Massachusetts Infantry Regiment during the American Civil War.
