= Count Gedney =

American baseball player (1849–1922)

- Left fielder
- Born: May 6, 1849; New York, New York, U.S.
- Died: March 26, 1922 (aged 72); Hackensack, New Jersey, U.S.
- Batted: Unknown Threw: Unknown

MLB debut
- April 27, 1872, for the Troy Haymakers

Last MLB appearance
- October 29, 1875, for the New York Mutuals

MLB statistics
- Batting average: .251
- Home runs: 5
- RBI: 99
- Stats at Baseball Reference

Teams
- National Association of Base Ball Players Union of Morrisania (1870) National Association of Professional BBP Troy Haymakers (1872) Brooklyn Eckfords (1872) New York Mutuals (1873), (1875) Philadelphia Athletics (1874)

Alfred W. "Count" Gedney (May 10, 1849 – March 26, 1922), was an American professional baseball player. During four seasons in the National Association of Professional Base Ball Players, 1872 to 1875, he played left field for four teams, the Troy Haymakers, Brooklyn Eckfords, New York Mutuals, and Philadelphia Athletics.

That service makes Gedney a "major leaguer". In 1870 he had been regular left fielder for the Union club of Morrisania, Bronx, one of fifteen professional teams, in the old Association, during its last season.

== Sources ==
- Career statistics from Baseball Reference · Retrosheet
- Wright, Marshall (2000). The National Association of Base Ball Players, 1857-1870. Jefferson, NC: McFarland & Co. ISBN 0-7864-0779-4.
