= Union of Morrisania =

Former American baseball club

Years 1855–1873

Based in Morrisania, Bronx, New York

League affiliations

National Amateur Association

Team colors

Red, white, blue

Ballpark
- Melrose Station grounds

League titles
- National Amateur Association pennants: 1 (1867)

The Union of Morrisania (founded 17 July 1855, South Bronx, New York, United States) was a baseball team which played in the National Association of Base Ball Players.

== History ==
In their first season, the Union played only one game, against Young America, which Union won, 25–8. In the second season, Union played five games. They finished second in the league with a record of 3 wins and 2 losses to the Brooklyn Atlantics who had four wins and no losses. From 1857 (with a record of three wins and two losses) to 1861, Union placed no higher than fifth. In the 1862 season, Union placed fourth with five wins and five losses. This encouraged the team and in the 1865 season, they placed third in the league with thirteen wins and ten losses. At the time, this was a franchise record.

In 1866, for the first time, Union placed first in the league with twenty-five wins and three losses. However, they did not win the premiership title. The following year, Union finished third with twenty-one wins and eight losses, succeeded in the playoffs, and beat the Brooklyn Atlantics to win their first and only premiership title. In 1868, Union finished third with thirty-seven wins and six losses. This was their best number of wins to losses.

In 1869, new professional baseball teams such as the Cincinnati Red Stockings entered the league. Union played only fifteen games, placing fifth with ten losses. In 1870, Union won seven games and lost eighteen games against the professional teams, and won twenty games and lost nineteen games against the rest of the league. After the 1870 season, Union refused to enter the new National Association of Professional Base Ball Players. The National Association of Base Ball Players was dissolved, and two years later, in 1873, the Union team disbanded.

== 1867 champion team ==
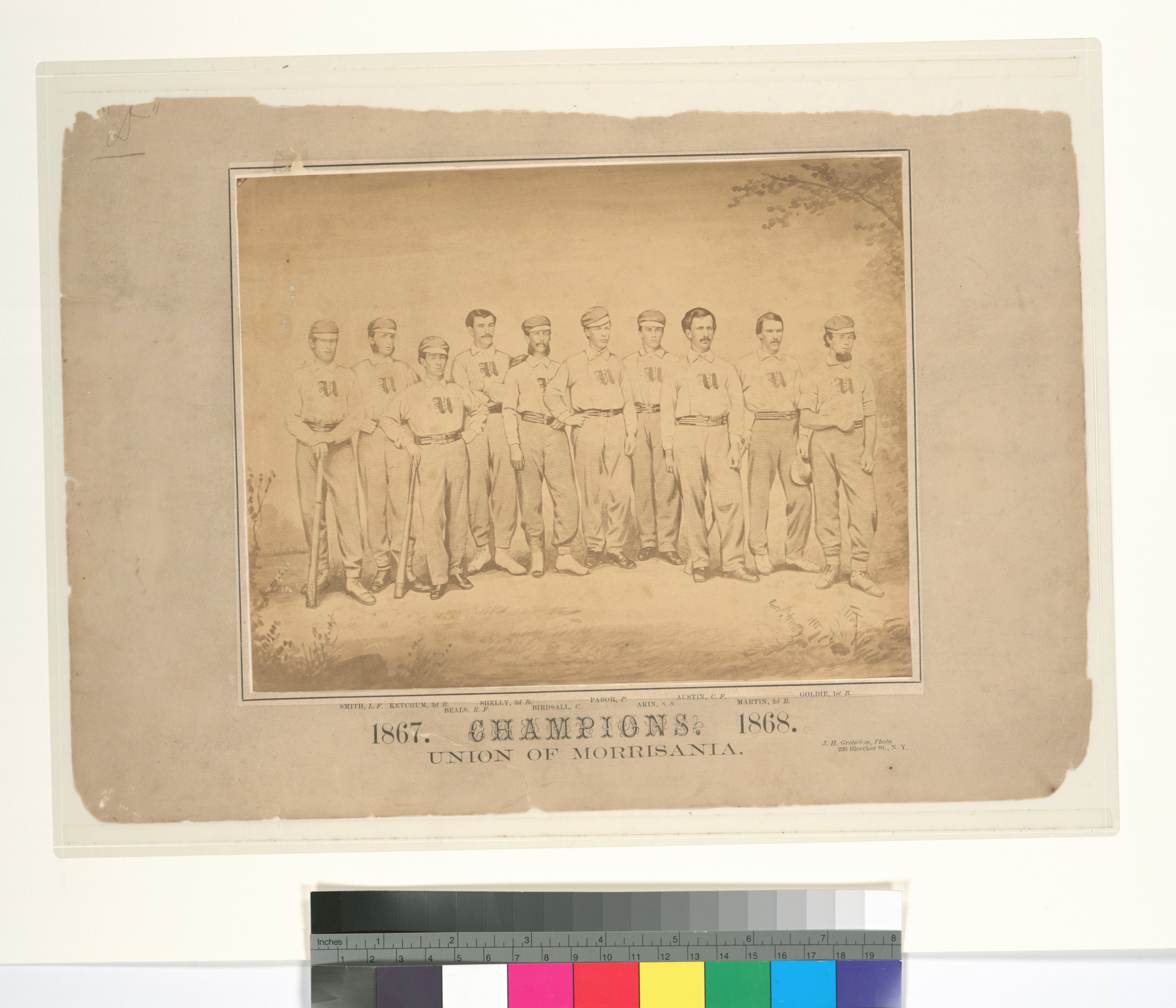
Champions 1867–68, Union of Morrisania – Smith, Ketchum, Shelly, Pabor, Austin, Goldie, Beals, Birdsall, Akin, Martin

On 10 October 1867, Union beat the Brooklyn Atlantics by fourteen runs to thirteen. Although Union had twenty one wins and eight losses in the season, they won the premiership title.

1867 NABBP title roster
Catcher – Dave Birdsall
Pitcher – Charlie Pabor
First Base – John Goldie
Second Base – Al Martin
Third Base – Dave Ketchum
Short Stop – George Smith
Out Fielder – Akbro Aiken
Out Fielder – Henry Austin
Out Fielder – Tommy Beals
Hudson?
William Abrahms?
Norton?
