= Favel Wordsworth =

American baseball player (1850–1888)

- Shortstop
- Born: April 1850; New York City, New York
- Died: August 12, 1888 (aged 38); New York City, New York
- Batted: Unknown Threw: Unknown

MLB debut
- April 28, 1873, for the Elizabeth Resolutes

Last MLB appearance
- August 7, 1873, for the Elizabeth Resolutes

MLB statistics
- Batting average: .238
- Home runs: 0
- RBIs: 3
- Stats at Baseball Reference

Teams
- Elizabeth Resolutes (1873)

Favel Parry Wordsworth (April 1850 – August 12, 1888) was a professional baseball player. He appeared in 12 games for the Elizabeth Resolutes of the National Association in 1873, primarily as a shortstop.
