= Frank Fleet =

American baseball player (1848–1900)

- Infielder / Pitcher
- Born: 1848; New York City, New York, U.S.
- Died: June 13, 1900 (aged 51–52); New York City, New York, U.S.
- Batted: Unknown Threw: Unknown

Major League debut
- October 18, 1871, for the New York Mutuals

Last major league appearance
- October 9, 1875, for the Brooklyn Atlantics

Major league statistics
- Batting average: .228
- Runs batted in: 37
- Win–loss record: 2-6
- Stats at Baseball Reference

Teams
- New York Mutuals (1871); Brooklyn Eckfords (1872); Elizabeth Resolutes (1873); Brooklyn Atlantics (1874); St. Louis Brown Stockings (1875); Brooklyn Atlantics (1875)

Frank H. Fleet (1848 – June 13, 1900) was an American professional baseball player in the 19th century.
