= Isaac Hicks =

American merchant

Isaac Hicks (1767 – January 10, 1820) was a Quaker merchant, active in the mercantile and shipping business from 1790 to 1807, both by himself and in partnerships.

== Early life ==
Isaac Hicks was born in 1767, into the Quaker farming community of Westbury, Long Island. He was the son of Samuel and Phebe (née Seamen). While in Westbury, Hicks worked both as a tailor and as a teacher. In 1789, disillusioned with teaching, Hicks moved to New York City: he opened a mercantile shop under the title of “grocer”.

=== Family ===
In 1789 he met Sara Doughty. They married in 1790 and had six children: John, Robert, Benjamin, Isaac, Elizabeth, and Mary. Hicks had a prominent extended family within the Quaker community which included Quaker minister Elias Hicks and artist Edward Hicks. He is also related to Nat Hicks, the catcher who revolutions the game of baseball by positing himself immediately behind the batter, instead of 25 feet back, which allowed the pitcher to throw curveballs, necessitating the invention of the baseball glove and catchers gear, and making baseball a much faster-paced game.

== Business enterprises ==
=== Grocer and dry-goods specialist ===
In 1789, Hicks moved from Westbury to New York City. He had saved money from working as a tailor and teacher, and opened a store under the title 'grocer'. While starting out as a grocer, Hicks also took in additional tailoring on the side.

In 1790 began a series of partnerships; first with Richard Loines; then with Richard Loines, his father William Loines, and William Loines’ brother-in-law, John Alsop Jr. Loines, Alsop, & Company specialized in importing British made dry goods, and it is within these partnerships that Hicks transitioned from the title ‘grocer’ to ‘dry-goods specialist’. It is also with Loines, Alsop & Co. that Hicks learned how to supplement his income, as the partnership owned a wharf, rented business properties, and were co-owners of a mill, all to bring in additional income during the slow seasons of their business.

In 1791, Loines, Alsop & Company dissolved. William Loines retired, Richard Loines joined with his brother John to create their own mercantile business, and Hicks and John Alsop Jr. continued their partnership under the new name of Alsop & Hicks. It was at this point that the pair began being seen in directories under the listing of ‘merchant’. For three years, Alsop & Hicks continued acting as an international importer of dry goods.

=== Shipping and commission agent ===
In 1794, after not making the money they expected and having trouble collecting on debts owed to them, the company Alsop & Hicks changed direction from ‘dry-goods specialists’ to ‘shipping and commission agents’.

This change allowed Alsop & Hicks to act as trusted agents for other merchants, selling goods that were sent to them rather than buying and selling on their own. The firm also helped merchants and captains outfit ships, purchase insurance, and obtain cargo. It was in this venture that Hicks’ relationships within the Quaker community were beneficial: Quaker merchants were more likely to trust other Quakers and their families with their goods than they would an outsider. Hicks used his position in the Quaker Meeting to more than double his contacts. In May 1794, John Alsop Jr. left New York City for a quieter life in Hudson, New York, though he did continue to maintain part interest in the firm and bring in customers from the Hudson area, including: Thomas Jenkins & Sons, Seth Jenkins, and the Paddock family, among others. It is these connections that also allowed Alsop & Hicks to gain commissions in Nantucket and New Bedford, Massachusetts, as well as continuing earlier commissions of cotton, tobacco, and rice, out of Savannah, Georgia. After continuing business in this manner for a number of years, Hicks dissolved his partnership with John Alsop Jr. and formed a partnership with Benjamin D. Doughty-longtime clerk of Alsop & Hicks. However, a yellow fever outbreak led to the death of Benjamin Doughty shortly after this partnership began, and Hicks refrained from creating new partnerships through his retirement.

Now that Hicks was on his own, while continuing to do business in the same manner as he did while part of Alsop & Hicks, Isaac Hicks began focusing more of his efforts towards increasing his sale of whale products-especially oil and spermaceti candles. These commissions made up the majority of his revenue until 1800. Hicks was able to increase and keep his trade contacts in the whaling market by being fastidious in attempting to regulate the fluctuating prices of whale oil, even when it was at the loss of a commission. He also attempted to restore some of the former marketing practices of spermaceti candle maker's in order to increase the candle maker's profits.

By 1800, Hicks commissions from whale merchants began a steady decline-mostly because of the changing circumstances within the whaling industry, as well as some decisions made by Hicks. Insurance rates were rising, the number of whales was dwindling in the Atlantic, and Hicks allowed his brother, Samuel, to take over many of his commissions when Samuel began his own business. Also, with the falling prices, captains and owners were becoming unhappy with their lack of income, and blamed the problems on Hicks. Because of the dwindling income from whale products, Hicks returned his focus to other forms of shipping and commission.

By 1802, Hicks began considering at least partial retirement from business, as he was beginning to get notices of declining health. It was because of this, that in December 1802, Hicks, along with others in a syndicate, purchased the ship Thames in order to capitalize on trade to St. Petersburg, Russia and quickly increase their earnings. When all was said and done, Hicks made a handsome profit-grossing nearly $14,000 ($292,611.21 in 2018). After a time, Hicks and his syndicate sold the Thames, and while Hicks continued to put on excursions to the Black Sea, none were as profitable. Regardless, by 1805, Hicks left New York City to return to Westbury and by 1807 had officially retired from business at the age of 38. His business passed on to his brother, Samuel Hicks.

=== Business records ===
Throughout his multiple partnerships, Hicks kept detailed business records, including but not limited to accounts current, invoices, insurance policies, bank notes, canceled checks, bonds, and correspondence. His correspondence primarily detailed business matters, and include records of which goods were sent on which ships, the destination of said goods, and sometimes notes on the voyages or the lives of the correspondents. This includes weather patterns, European politics, the Napoleonic wars and other military conflicts, piracy, disease (primarily yellow fever and smallpox), and more.

Throughout his career, Hicks associated with businesses and companies such as the Merchants' Bank of New York, the Bank of New York, United States Bank, United Insurance Company, New-York Insurance Company, and The Marine Insurance Company of New York, among others.

== Personal life ==
Throughout Hicks’ career, he was a staunch abolitionist and active in the Quaker Meeting. He was a member of an anti-slavery organization that mixed both Friends and prominent non-Quakers, as well as a member of the New York Manumission Society. Hicks did trade in slave goods such as cotton, tobacco, indigo, and rice. As part of the New York Manumission Society, he was a fund-raiser for the African Free School. Hicks occasionally put spiritual endeavors ahead of his business endeavors, taking time out of his work to attend yearly meetings, and doing work with his local Meeting. While these religious endeavors might have been a distraction during his career, it became all-consuming after Hicks entered retirement.

Hicks was also extremely active in the Quaker Meeting, acting on multiple committees. In 1816, he was nominated for Clerk of the Westbury Meeting. He was also well known in many other Quaker circles outside of the Meeting, mostly thanks to his cousin, Elias Hicks, who Isaac traveled extensively with in his retirement. Hicks also worked closely with his cousin, Edward Hicks, in an attempt to bring him back to preaching and away from painting by paying off his debts. After an active and varied retirement, Hicks fell ill on January 10, 1820, and died shortly thereafter at 52 years old.
