= 1873 Philadelphia Athletics season =

1873 Philadelphia Athletics
- League: National Association of Professional Base Ball Players
- Ballpark: Jefferson Street Grounds
- City: Philadelphia, Pennsylvania
- Record: 28–23 (.549)
- League place: 5th
- Managers: Dick McBride

The 1873 Athletic Baseball Club of Philadelphia finished in fifth place in the National Association with a record of 28–23. First baseman Cap Anson batted .398 and was second in the league batting race.

== Regular season ==
=== Season standings ===
National Association	W	L	T	Pct.	GB
Boston Red Stockings	43	16	1	.725	—
Philadelphia White Stockings	36	17	—	.679	4
Baltimore Canaries	34	22	1	.605	7½
Philadelphia Athletics	28	23	1	.548	11
New York Mutuals	29	24	—	.547	11
Brooklyn Atlantics	17	37	1	.318	23½
Washington Blue Legs	8	31	—	.205	25
Elizabeth Resolutes	2	21	—	.087	23
Baltimore Marylands	0	6	—	.000	16½

=== Record vs. opponents ===
1873 National Association Records Sources:
Team	BC	BM	BOS	BR	EL	NY	PHA	PWS	WSH
Baltimore Canaries	—	4–0	2–7–1	7–2	3–0	6–3	3–4	3–6	6–0
Baltimore Marylands	0–4	—	0–0	0–0	0–0	0–0	0–0	0–0	0–2
Boston	7–2–1	0–0	—	8–1	4–1	6–3	4–5	5–4	9–0
Brooklyn	2–7	0–0	1–8	—	3–1	2–7	4–5–1	2–7	3–2
Elizabeth	0–3	0–0	1–4	1–3	—	0–4	0–2	0–4	0–1
New York	3–6	0–0	3–6	7–2	4–0	—	4–5	4–4	4–1
Philadelphia Athletics	4–3	0–0	5–4	5–4–1	2–0	5–4	—	1–8	6–0
Philadelphia White Stockings	6–3	0–0	4–5	7–2	4–0	4–4	8–1	—	3–2
Washington	0–6	2–0	0–9	2–3	1–0	1–4	0–6	2–3	—

=== Roster ===
1873 Philadelphia Athletics
Roster
Pitchers: Dick McBride	Catchers: John Clapp; Infielders: Cap Anson; Wes Fisler; Mike McGeary; Ezra Sutton	Outfielders: Joe Battin; Cherokee Fisher; John McMullin; Tim Murnane; Al Reach; Count Sensenderfer	Manager: Dick McBride

== Player stats ==
=== Batting ===
==== Starters by position ====
Note: Pos = Position; G = Games played; AB = At bats; H = Hits; Avg. = Batting average; HR = Home runs; RBI = Runs batted in

Pos	Player	G	AB	H	Avg.	HR	RBI
C	John Clapp	45	204	62	.304	1	27
1B	Cap Anson	52	254	101	.398	0	36
2B	Wes Fisler	44	218	75	.344	1	41
SS	Mike McGeary	52	275	83	.302	0	31
3B	Ezra Sutton	51	243	81	.333	0	34
OF	Tim Murnane	41	176	39	.222	1	10
OF	John McMullin	52	227	62	.273	0	28
OF	Cherokee Fisher	51	253	66	.261	1	37

==== Other batters ====
Note: G = Games played; AB = At bats; H = Hits; Avg. = Batting average; HR = Home runs; RBI = Runs batted in

Player	G	AB	H	Avg.	HR	RBI
Count Sensenderfer	20	86	24	.279	0	8
Al Reach	16	73	16	.219	0	9
Joe Battin	1	5	3	.600	0	2

=== Pitching ===
==== Starting pitchers ====
Note: G = Games pitched; IP = Innings pitched; W = Wins; L = Losses; ERA = Earned run average; SO = Strikeouts

Player	G	IP	W	L	ERA	SO
Dick McBride	46	382.2	24	19	3.34	25
John McMullin	1	8.0	1	0	2.25	2

==== Relief pitchers ====
Note: G = Games pitched; IP = Innings pitched; W = Wins; L = Losses; ERA = Earned run average; SO = Strikeouts

Player	G	IP	W	L	ERA	SO
Cherokee Fisher	13	84.1	3	4	1.81	14
