= Nat Hicks =

American baseball player (1845–1907)

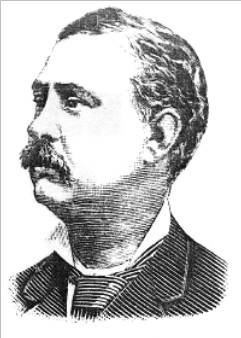
- Catcher
- Born: April 19, 1845; Hempstead, New York, US
- Died: April 21, 1907 (aged 62); Hoboken, New Jersey, US
- Batted: Right Threw: Right

MLB debut
- April 22, 1872, for the New York Mutuals

Last MLB appearance
- June 5, 1877, for the Cincinnati Reds

MLB statistics
- Batting average: .264
- Home runs: 1
- Runs batted in: 116
- Stats at Baseball Reference

Teams
- National Association of Base Ball Players Eagle of New York (1866–1869) Star of Brooklyn (1870) Washington Nationals (1870) League player New York Mutuals (1872–1873), (1875–1876) Philadelphia White Stockings (1874) Cincinnati Reds (1877) League manager New York Mutuals (1875)

Nathaniel Woodhull Hicks (April 19, 1845 – April 21, 1907) was an American professional baseball player. He played as a catcher in Major League Baseball for six seasons, two in the National League. Hicks was one of the first catchers to stand directly behind the batter. This allowed future Hall of Fame pitcher, Candy Cummings to develop the first curveball used in baseball. Hicks was a popular and highly regarded player during his time in baseball, but injuries sustained over the course of his career cut his playing time short.

== Early life ==
Nat Hicks was born in Hempstead, New York into the famous Hicks family. His father was Jackson Hicks (born 1811), and his mother, Sarah Sweet (born 1817). The family moved to Newtown Queens circa 1850 where his siblings were born: brother Barnett (born 1852) and a sister Delia (born 1855). His paternal grandparents were Jeffery Hicks (1778–1829) and Mary Polly Hicks (1784–1854). His patrilineal great-grandparents were Jeffrey Hicks (1739–1790) who had been born in Flushing, and Mary Cornell (1745–1792).

Hick's relatives included famous Quaker and abolitionist Elias Hicks also of Hempstead, and Elias' son Valentine Hicks, who first settled the community of Hicksville, Long Island, and was later president of the Long Island Rail Road. He was also a distant cousin of Quaker and painter Edward Hicks. He is related Isaac Hicks, who founded Hicks Nursery in 1852. He was great nephew of pioneering 1872 female Presidential candidate Victoria Woodhull and her husband James Harvey Blood.

Hicks served briefly in the 15th New York Infantry Regiment near the end of the American Civil War.

== Career ==
Hicks began playing professional baseball in the National Association of Base Ball Players through 1871, most notably for the Eckford of Brooklyn. Hicks' style played a significant role in the development of the curveball. Most catchers of his era stood twenty to twenty-five feet behind the batter, which made it impossible to field a curveball. It was Hicks' catching technique of standing directly behind the batter, sometimes using a beefsteak to cushion his hand, as gloves were not yet commonly worn, that allowed Candy Cummings to introduce his curveball. The introduction of the curveball not only caused a revolutionary change in the way catchers fielded their position, but also radically changed pitching as well. Indeed, Hicks' transformation of catching reduced wild pitches and increased the power of the catcher to throw out runners and, thus, moderated the impact of base running on the scoring of runs and chaotic volatility of the early sport.

He later moved on and spent most of his career playing in the National Association. He joined the New York Mutuals in 1872 where he was reunited with Cummings, and became their everyday catcher. He batted .306 that season as the Mutuals finished third. Hicks returned with the Mutuals in 1873, but that season saw his skills decline significantly both in the field and at the bat. He played in only 28 games and shared the catching duties that season with Dick Higham and Doug Allison.

On July 24, 1873, Bob Ferguson of the Brooklyn Atlantics was the umpire in a game between the New York Mutuals and the Baltimore Canaries which ended with the Mutuals scoring 3 runs in the bottom of the 9th inning for an 11–10 victory. Ferguson and the Mutuals' Hicks got into a verbal altercation which ended with Ferguson breaking Hicks' arm by hitting him with a bat. Ferguson required a police escort to leave the field and Hicks was out of action for 2 months.

Hicks changed teams in 1874, joining the Philadelphia White Stockings where he was once again reunited with Cummings, and enjoyed a bounce back season, batting .274, and caught every game the team played. He returned to the Mutuals in 1875 when he was named the player-manager, the only stint as a manager in his career. There is some dispute with this notion, as other baseball references have him as player-manager for the White Stockings the previous year as well, instead of Bill Craver. When the Association folded, the Mutuals and Hicks moved over to the newly formed National League in 1876, and then finished his career with the Cincinnati Reds.

== Personal life ==
In 1873, Hicks married Margaret Mehan, the daughter of Irish immigrants, with whom he had ten children. They married in Hoboken, New Jersey, and they are interred together at St. Peter's Catholic Cemetery.

== Post-career ==
After his baseball days were over, he became a professional singer and proprietor of a billiard academy. While Cummings went on to become enshrined in the Baseball Hall of Fame, Hicks' role in the development of the curveball is rarely mentioned. Hicks died in Hoboken, New Jersey at the age of 62 of accidental gas asphyxiation in a hotel room, and was interred in St. Peter's Cemetery in Jersey City, New Jersey.

== See also ==
- Denny Mack – the Radcliffe affair
