= Tommy Beals =

American baseball player (1850–1915)

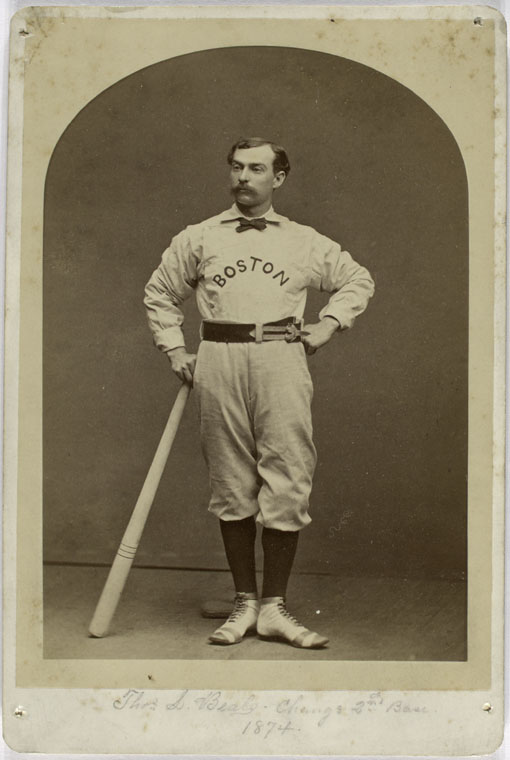
- Outfielder / Second baseman
- Born: August 1850; New York City, New York, U.S.
- Died: October 2, 1915 (aged 65); San Francisco, California, U.S.
- Batted: Right Threw: Unknown

Major-league debut
- July 27, 1871, for the Washington Olympics

Last major-league appearance
- September 29, 1880, for the Chicago White Stockings

Major-league statistics
- Batting average: .243
- Runs: 109
- Runs batted in: 64
- Stats at Baseball Reference

Teams
- National Association of Base Ball Players Union of Morrisania (1867) League Player Washington Olympics (1871–1873) Washington Blue Legs (1873) Boston Red Stockings (1874–1875) Chicago White Stockings (1880)

Thomas Lamb Beals (August 1850 – October 2, 1915) was an American professional baseball player in the National Association of Professional Base Ball Players and the National League. He played mostly in the outfield and at second base for the Washington Olympics, Washington Blue Legs, Boston Red Stockings, and Chicago White Stockings from 1871 to 1880.

== Baseball career ==
Beals made his major-league debut for the Olympics playing under the name W. Thomas on July 27, 1871. The Olympics franchise did not last beyond nine games into their 1872 schedule, and Beals was able to join the Blue Stockings the next season as a second baseman/catcher. He had the best season of his career, hitting .272 with a career-high 24 RBI on 46 hits.

In 1874, Beals started playing under his given name with the perennially powerful Red Stockings. As a part-time second baseman/outfielder, he only managed to hit .196. He reprised his part-time role in the Boston outfield the next season but significantly increased his production, hitting .265. After that 1875 season, the National Association folded and was replaced by the National League, and Beals was without a job in major-league baseball for the next four seasons. He moved west, living first in Colorado and then in California, where he played in the California League.

Beals reemerged in 1880 with the White Stockings at age 29. He played 13 games for the Chicago club that season, hitting a career-low .152, and hung up his spikes after the season.

== Personal life ==
Beals died, at the age of 65, on October 2, 1915, in San Francisco, California, and he is interred at Cypress Lawn Memorial Park in Colma, California.
