= John Greason =

American baseball player (1851–1889)

- Pitcher
- Born: July 29, 1851; Washington, D.C., U.S.
- Died: July 22, 1889 (aged 37); Washington, D.C., U.S.
- Batted: Unknown Threw: Unknown

MLB debut
- August 27, 1873, for the Washington Blue Legs

Last MLB appearance
- September 6, 1873, for the Washington Blue Legs

MLB statistics
- Win–loss record: 1–6
- Games pitched: 7
- Earned run average: 5.86
- Stats at Baseball Reference

Teams
- Washington Blue Legs (1873)

John A. Greason (July 29, 1851 – July 22, 1889) was an American professional baseball player from Washington, D.C. who pitched a total of seven games for the 1873 Washington Blue Legs of the National Association of Professional Base Ball Players. In his short one-season career, he started and completed all seven of his games, had a 1–6 win–loss record and a 5.86 ERA.
