= Fraley Rogers =

American baseball player (1850–1881)

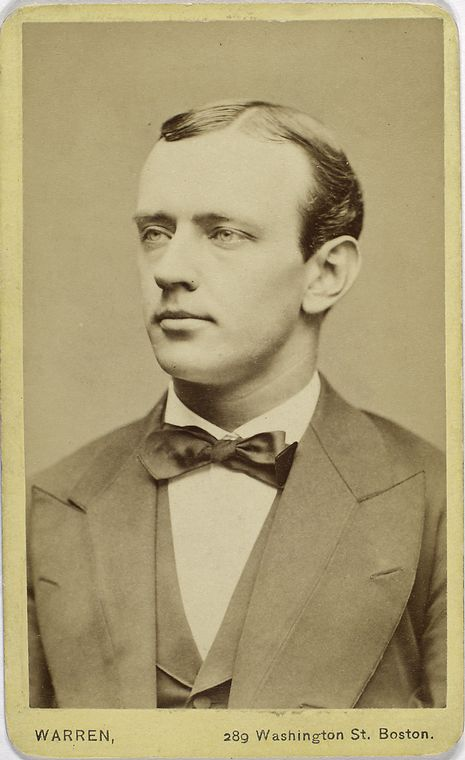
- Right fielder
- Born: December 25, 1850; Brooklyn, New York, U.S.
- Died: May 10, 1881 (aged 30); New York City, New York, U.S.
- Batted: Unknown Threw: Unknown

MLB debut
- April 30, 1872, for the Boston Red Stockings

Last MLB appearance
- July 16, 1873, for the Boston Red Stockings

MLB statistics
- Batting average: .276
- Home runs: 1
- RBI: 30
- Stats at Baseball Reference

Teams
- National Association of Base Ball Players Resolute of Brooklyn (1865) Star of Brooklyn (1866–1870) National Association of Professional BBP Boston Red Stockings (1872–1873)

Career highlights and awards
- Led the National Association in games played by a right fielder in 1872; Played on the National Association championship team, 1872

Fraley W. Rogers (December 25, 1850 – May 10, 1881) was an American baseball player at the dawn of the professional era. He played primarily for the amateur Star club of Brooklyn. In 1872 he moved to right field for the Boston Red Stockings in the National Association of Professional Base Ball Players, the first professional league now in its second season.

Boston won the championship. It was Rogers' only full season with the pros, but he did play in two games for the Red Stockings in 1873.

Rogers committed suicide with a gun at the age of 30 in New York City, possibly due to malarial fever affecting his mental state. He is interred at Pine Grove Cemetery in Westborough, Massachusetts.
