= Mansfield Club Grounds =

Baseball ballpark in Middletown, Connecticut

Coordinates: 41.556°N 72.637°W

- Interactive map of Mansfield Club Grounds
- Former names: Fort Hill Grounds; Mansfield Club Grounds
- Location: Middletown, CT 06457
- Capacity: 800
- Surface: Grass

Tenants
- Middletown Mansfields (NAPBBP) (1872)

Mansfield Club Grounds, also known as Mansfield Park and Fort Hill Grounds, was a baseball ballpark located in Middletown, Connecticut. The ballpark was home to the Middletown Mansfields baseball club during the 1872 season, from May 2nd until July 4th. Like the team, it was named after Civil War General Joseph K. Mansfield.

The land for the ballpark, which overlooked Middletown, the Connecticut River, and the Valley Railroad, was donated in 1871 by Dewitt Clinton Sage who owned a nearby brick factory. The former site is now a residential development.
