= Bob Reach =

American baseball player (1843–1922)

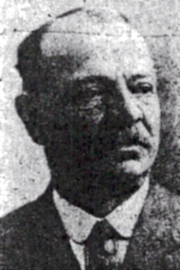
- Shortstop
- Born: August 28, 1843; Brooklyn, New York, U.S.
- Died: May 19, 1922 (aged 78); Springfield, Massachusetts, U.S.
- Batted: Unknown Threw: Unknown

Major league debut
- April 18, 1872, for the Washington Olympics

Last major league appearance
- October 23, 1873, for the Washington Blue Legs

Major league statistics
- Games played: 3
- Hits: 3
- Batting average: .231
- Stats at Baseball Reference

Teams
- Washington Olympics (1872); Washington Blue Legs (1873)

Robert Reach (August 28, 1843 – May 19, 1922) was an American amateur and professional baseball player born in Brooklyn, New York. He played shortstop in three games during a two season span in the National Association, from 1872 to 1873. Reach had previously played for the 1869 Olympics, and the 1868 Philadelphia Keystones teams when they were in the amateur National Association. He played two games for the 1872 Washington Olympics, collecting two hits in eight at bats, and scored one run. Then, in 1873, he played one game for the Washington Blue Legs, collecting one hit in five at bats, while scoring one run. In total, he batted 13 times, had three hits, scored two runs, and had a .231 batting average.

His brother, Al Reach, played five seasons for the Philadelphia Athletics of the National Association. It is very likely that Reach was an American Civil War veteran. Reach died in Springfield, Massachusetts at the age of 78, and is interred at Oak Grove Cemetery.
