= 1873 Philadelphia White Stockings season =

1873 Philadelphia White Stockings
- League: National Association of Professional Base Ball Players
- Ballpark: Jefferson Street Grounds
- City: Philadelphia, Pennsylvania
- Record: 36–17 (.679)
- League place: 2nd
- Managers: Fergy Malone, Jimmy Wood

The Philadelphia White Stockings played their first season in 1873 as a member of the National Association of Professional Base Ball Players. They finished second in the league with a record of 36–17.

== Regular season ==
=== Season standings ===
| National Association | W | L | T | Pct. | GB |
|---|---|---|---|---|---|
| Boston Red Stockings | 43 | 16 | 1 | .725 | — |
| Philadelphia White Stockings | 36 | 17 | — | .679 | 4 |
| Baltimore Canaries | 34 | 22 | 1 | .605 | 7½ |
| Philadelphia Athletics | 28 | 23 | 1 | .548 | 11 |
| New York Mutuals | 29 | 24 | — | .547 | 11 |
| Brooklyn Atlantics | 17 | 37 | 1 | .318 | 23½ |
| Washington Blue Legs | 8 | 31 | — | .205 | 25 |
| Elizabeth Resolutes | 2 | 21 | — | .087 | 23 |
| Baltimore Marylands | 0 | 6 | — | .000 | 16½ |

=== Record vs. opponents ===
1873 National Association Records Sources:
| Team | BC | BM | BOS | BR | EL | NY | PHA | PWS | WSH |
|---|---|---|---|---|---|---|---|---|---|
| Baltimore Canaries | — | 4–0 | 2–7–1 | 7–2 | 3–0 | 6–3 | 3–4 | 3–6 | 6–0 |
| Baltimore Marylands | 0–4 | — | 0–0 | 0–0 | 0–0 | 0–0 | 0–0 | 0–0 | 0–2 |
| Boston | 7–2–1 | 0–0 | — | 8–1 | 4–1 | 6–3 | 4–5 | 5–4 | 9–0 |
| Brooklyn | 2–7 | 0–0 | 1–8 | — | 3–1 | 2–7 | 4–5–1 | 2–7 | 3–2 |
| Elizabeth | 0–3 | 0–0 | 1–4 | 1–3 | — | 0–4 | 0–2 | 0–4 | 0–1 |
| New York | 3–6 | 0–0 | 3–6 | 7–2 | 4–0 | — | 4–5 | 4–4 | 4–1 |
| Philadelphia Athletics | 4–3 | 0–0 | 5–4 | 5–4–1 | 2–0 | 5–4 | — | 1–8 | 6–0 |
| Philadelphia White Stockings | 6–3 | 0–0 | 4–5 | 7–2 | 4–0 | 4–4 | 8–1 | — | 3–2 |
| Washington | 0–6 | 2–0 | 0–9 | 2–3 | 1–0 | 1–4 | 0–6 | 2–3 | — |

=== Roster ===
1873 Philadelphia Whites
Roster
| Pitchers: George Zettlein; Catchers: Fergy Malone | Infielders: Bob Addy; Jim Devlin; Chick Fulmer; Denny Mack; Levi Meyerle; Jimmy Wood | Outfielders: George Bechtel; Ned Cuthbert; Johnny Ryan; Fred Treacey | Managers: Fergy Malone; Jimmy Wood |

== Player stats ==
=== Batting ===
Note: G = Games played; AB = At bats; H = Hits; Avg. = Batting average; HR = Home runs; RBI = Runs batted in

| Player | G | AB | H | Avg. | HR | RBI |
|---|---|---|---|---|---|---|
| Fergy Malone | 53 | 259 | 75 | .290 | 0 | 41 |
| Denny Mack | 48 | 205 | 60 | .293 | 0 | 19 |
| Jimmy Wood | 42 | 209 | 67 | .321 | 0 | 27 |
| Chick Fulmer | 49 | 236 | 66 | .280 | 1 | 35 |
| Levi Meyerle | 48 | 238 | 83 | .349 | 3 | 59 |
| Fred Treacey | 51 | 243 | 62 | .255 | 1 | 31 |
| George Bechtel | 53 | 258 | 63 | .244 | 1 | 39 |
| Ned Cuthbert | 51 | 279 | 77 | .276 | 2 | 34 |
| Jim Devlin | 23 | 99 | 24 | .242 | 0 | 10 |
| Bob Addy | 10 | 51 | 16 | .314 | 0 | 10 |
| Johnny Ryan | 2 | 8 | 2 | .250 | 0 | 1 |

=== Starting pitchers ===
Note: G = Games pitched; IP = Innings pitched; W = Wins; L = Losses; ERA = Earned run average; SO = Strikeouts

| Player | G | IP | W | L | ERA | SO |
|---|---|---|---|---|---|---|
| George Zettlein | 51 | 460.0 | 36 | 15 | 2.86 | 29 |
| George Bechtel | 3 | 16.0 | 0 | 2 | 4.50 | 0 |

==== Relief pitchers ====
Note: G = Games pitched; W = Wins; L = Losses; SV = Saves; ERA = Earned run average; SO = Strikeouts

| Player | G | W | L | SV | ERA | SO |
|---|---|---|---|---|---|---|
| Chick Fulmer | 2 | 0 | 0 | 0 | 3.60 | 0 |
