= Dave Birdsall =

American baseball player (1838–1896)

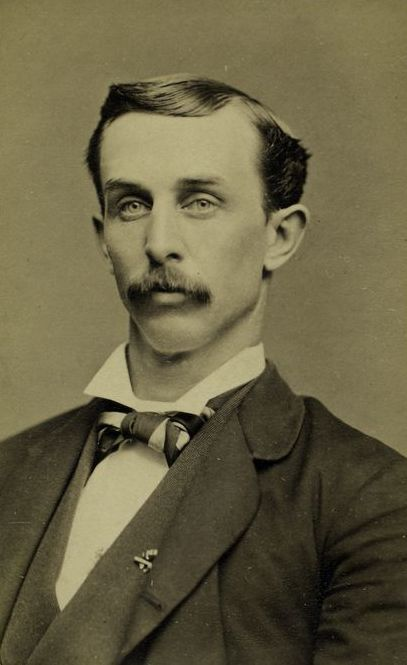
- Birdsall in 1872
- Outfielder / Catcher
- Born: July 16, 1838; New York, New York, U.S.
- Died: December 30, 1896 (aged 58); Boston, Massachusetts, U.S.
- Batted: Right Threw: Right

Major-league debut
- May 5, 1871, for the Boston Red Stockings

Last major-league appearance
- May 17, 1873, for the Boston Red Stockings

Major-league statistics
- Batting average: .264
- Runs scored: 66
- Runs batted in: 39
- Stats at Baseball Reference

Teams
- National Association of Base Ball Players Metropolitan of New York (1858) Harlem of New York (1862) Union of Morrisania (1863–1868, 1870) Washington Nationals (1869) National Association of Professional BBP Boston Red Stockings (1871–1873)

David Solomon Birdsall (July 16, 1838 – December 30, 1896) was an American amateur and professional baseball player. He played for the Boston Red Stockings from 1871 to 1873 as an outfielder and catcher.

== Baseball career ==
Birdsall first played in the National Association of Base Ball Players, for several teams between 1858 and 1870. He then played in the National Association of Professional Base Ball Players (commonly known as the National Association) for the Boston Red Stockings during 1871–1873. He was a member of the 1872 championship team, which finished first in the National Association with a record of 39–8. In 48 games with Boston during three seasons, Birdsall compiled a .264 batting average.

== Personal life ==
Birdsall served with the 87th New York Volunteer Infantry in the American Civil War from June 1861 to July 1865. He died in Boston in December 1896.

== Sources ==
- Career statistics from Baseball Reference · Retrosheet
