= 1873 Baltimore Canaries season =

1873 Baltimore Canaries
- League: National Association of Professional Base Ball Players
- Ballpark: Newington Park
- City: Baltimore, Maryland
- Record: 34–22 (.607)
- League place: 2nd
- Managers: Cal McVey, Tom Carey

The Baltimore Canaries played in 1873 as a member of the National Association of Professional Base Ball Players. They finished third in the league with a record of 34–22.

== Regular season ==
=== Season standings ===
National Association	W	L	GB	Pct.
Boston Red Stockings	43	16	–	.729
Philadelphia White Stockings	36	17	4.0	.679
Baltimore Canaries	34	22	7.5	.607
New York Mutuals	29	24	11.0	.547
Philadelphia Athletics	28	23	11.0	.549
Brooklyn Atlantics	17	37	23.5	.205
Washington Blue Legs	8	31	25.0	.205
Elizabeth Resolutes	2	21	23.0	.087
Baltimore Marylands	0	6	16.5	.000

=== Record vs. opponents ===
1873 National Association Records Sources:
Team	BC	BM	BOS	BR	EL	NY	PHA	PWS	WSH
Baltimore Canaries	—	4–0	2–7–1	7–2	3–0	6–3	3–4	3–6	6–0
Baltimore Marylands	0–4	—	0–0	0–0	0–0	0–0	0–0	0–0	0–2
Boston	7–2–1	0–0	—	8–1	4–1	6–3	4–5	5–4	9–0
Brooklyn	2–7	0–0	1–8	—	3–1	2–7	4–5–1	2–7	3–2
Elizabeth	0–3	0–0	1–4	1–3	—	0–4	0–2	0–4	0–1
New York	3–6	0–0	3–6	7–2	4–0	—	4–5	4–4	4–1
Philadelphia Athletics	4–3	0–0	5–4	5–4–1	2–0	5–4	—	1–8	6–0
Philadelphia White Stockings	6–3	0–0	4–5	7–2	4–0	4–4	8–1	—	3–2
Washington	0–6	2–0	0–9	2–3	1–0	1–4	0–6	2–3	—

=== Roster ===
1873 Baltimore Canaries
Roster
Pitchers: Asa Brainard; Candy Cummings	Catchers: Bill Craver; Scott Hastings; Cal McVey; Infielders: Tom Carey; Davy Force; Everett Mills; John Radcliff	Outfielders: Bill Barrett; George Hall; Lip Pike; Tom York	Manager: Bill Craver; Everett Mills

== Player stats ==
=== Batting ===
Note: G = Games played; AB = At bats; H = Hits; Avg. = Batting average; HR = Home runs; RBI = Runs batted in

Player	G	AB	H	Avg.	HR	RBI
Cal McVey	38	192	73	.380	2	35
Everett Mills	54	262	87	.332	0	56
Tom Carey	56	291	98	.337	1	55
John Radcliff	45	244	70	.287	0	33
Davy Force	49	233	85	.365	0	30
Tom York	57	278	84	.302	2	50
Lip Pike	56	285	90	.316	4	51
George Hall	35	168	58	.345	0	31
Bill Craver	41	197	57	.289	0	26
Scott Hastings	30	145	41	.283	0	15
Bill Barrett	1	4	1	.250	0	0

=== Starting pitchers ===
Note: G = Games pitched; IP = Innings pitched; W = Wins; L = Losses; ERA = Earned run average; SO = Strikeouts

Player	G	IP	W	L	ERA	SO
Candy Cummings	42	382.0	28	14	2.80	34
Asa Brainard	14	108.2	5	7	4.14	3

==== Relief pitchers ====
Note: G = Games pitched; W = Wins; L = Losses; SV = Saves; ERA = Earned run average; SO = Strikeouts

Player	G	W	L	SV	ERA	SO
Davy Force	3	1	1	0	2.50	0
