= Ed Atkinson =

American baseball player

- Right fielder
- Born: c. 1851; Baltimore, Maryland, U.S.
- Died: Unknown
- Batted: Unknown Threw: Unknown

MLB debut
- October 22, 1873, for the Washington Blue Legs

Last MLB appearance
- October 23, 1873, for the Washington Blue Legs

MLB statistics
- At bats: 8
- RBIs: 0
- Home runs: 0
- Batting average: .000
- Stats at Baseball Reference

Teams
- Washington Blue Legs – (1873)

Edward Atkinson (c. 1851 – ?) was an American professional baseball player from Baltimore, Maryland. He played two games in right field for the 1873 Washington Blue Legs of the National Association of Professional Base Ball Players, and went hitless in eight at bats.
