= Howard Wall (baseball) =

American baseball player (1854–1909)

- Shortstop
- Born: December 1854; Washington, D.C., U.S.
- Died: March 15, 1909 (aged 54); Washington, D.C., U.S.
- Batted: Unknown Threw: Unknown

MLB debut
- September 13, 1873, for the Washington Blue Legs

Last MLB appearance
- September 13, 1873, for the Washington Blue Legs

MLB statistics
- Games played: 1
- Hits: 1
- Batting average: .333
- Stats at Baseball Reference

Teams
- Washington Blue Legs (1873)

Howard Cornelius Wall (December 1854 – March 15, 1909) was an American Major League Baseball shortstop who played in one game for the 1873 Washington Blue Legs of the National Association. At 18, Wall was the fourth-youngest player in the National Association. He played his lone game on September 13, and collected one hit in three at bats for a .333 batting average. Wall died at the age of 54 in his hometown of Washington, D.C., and is interred at Oak Hill Cemetery.
