= Jim Britt (baseball) =

American baseball player (1856–1923)

- Pitcher
- Born: February 25, 1856; Brooklyn, New York
- Died: February 28, 1923 (aged 67); San Francisco, California
- Batted: Unknown Threw: Unknown

MLB debut
- May 2, 1872, for the Brooklyn Atlantics

Last MLB appearance
- November 1, 1873, for the Brooklyn Atlantics

MLB statistics
- Win–loss record: 26–64
- Earned run average: 4.26
- Strikeouts: 29
- Stats at Baseball Reference

Teams
- Brooklyn Atlantics (1872–1873)

James Edward Britt (February 25, 1856 – February 28, 1923), was a professional baseball player who played pitcher from 1872 to 1873 for the Brooklyn Atlantics.
