= Cy Bentley =

American baseball player (1850–1873)

- Pitcher
- Born: November 23, 1850; East Haven, Connecticut, US
- Died: February 26, 1873 (aged 22); Middletown, Connecticut, US
- Batted: Unknown Threw: Unknown

Major-league debut
- April 26, 1872, for the Middletown Mansfields

Last major-league appearance
- August 9, 1872, for the Middletown Mansfields

Major-league statistics
- Win–loss record: 2–15
- Earned run average: 6.56
- Strikeouts: 5
- Stats at Baseball Reference

Teams
- National Association of Base Ball Players Middletown Mansfields (1869–1870) National Association of Professional BBP Middletown Mansfields (1872)

Clytus George "Cy" Bentley (November 23, 1850 – February 26, 1873) was an American professional baseball pitcher who played one season of major-league baseball, for the 1872 Middletown Mansfields of the National Association.

== Career ==
Born in East Haven, Connecticut, Bentley began pitching for the Middletown Mansfields in 1869. On the Fourth of July in 1871, he pitched against the Star Club of Brooklyn, whose pitcher was Candy Cummings, commonly credited as the inventor of the curveball. Cummings outdueled Bentley in a 5–3 Brooklyn win.

Bentley played his only season in major-league baseball for the 1872 Middletown Mansfields. Bentley was the primary starting pitcher for the Mansfields, starting 17 of their 24 games and completing 16 of them. He gave up 285 baserunners (273 hits and 12 walks), 252 runs, 105 of them were earned. For the season he won 2, lost 15, and had an ERA of 6.14, in 144 innings pitched. Bentley's two victories came against the Cleveland Forest Citys (10-5) and the Washington Nationals (28-23), both in the month of May.

== Death ==
Bentley, an iron molder by trade, died on February 26, 1873, of tuberculosis in Middletown, Connecticut, and is buried at Mortimer Cemetery in Middletown.

== See also ==
- List of baseball players who died during their careers
