= Waverly Fairgrounds =

Defunct baseball venue in Elizabeth, New Jersey

Coordinates: 40.693°N 74.205°W

Waverly Fairgrounds (often styled as Waverly "Fair Grounds") or Waverly Park was the home of the Elizabeth Resolutes baseball club. The Resolutes participated in the National Association 1873 season, so Waverly is considered a major league ballpark by those who count the NA as a major league.

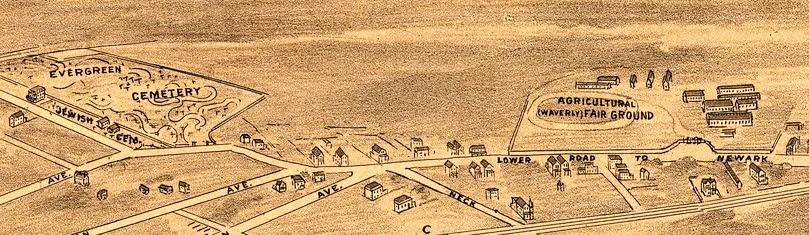
Racing oval as it looked in 1898

The park was located in a community called Waverly, which was bordered by Lower Road (now Dayton Avenue), Haynes Avenue, and Frelinghuysen Street. The site is now split by Weequahic Park in Newark and B'nai Jeshuron Cemetery in Elizabeth.

The New Jersey State Fair was held here from 1867 through 1898. The land was sold to Essex County for development into what is now Weequahic Park.

The Resolutes began in about 1869 as an independent club, staging games at Waverly against New York area clubs including members of the NA. The Resolutes joined the NA in 1873 and played seven games at Waverly, from April 28 through July 23. All of them were losses, during their forlorn 2–21 season overall. Soon after, the Resolutes ceased operations.

The exact location of the diamond is uncertain. Based on other usages of fair grounds as ballparks, it is reasonable to suppose that it was within the race track. The race track continued to be used for the better part of the 20th century. Its remnant is an oval-shaped roadway.
