= Harry Schafer =

American baseball player (1846–1935)

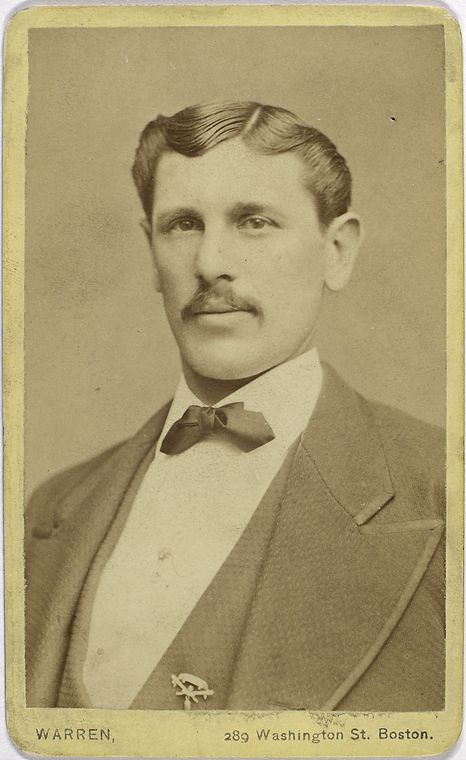
- Third baseman
- Born: August 14, 1846; Philadelphia, Pennsylvania, U.S.
- Died: February 28, 1935 (aged 88); Philadelphia, Pennsylvania, U.S.
- Batted: Right Threw: Right

MLB debut
- May 5, 1871, for the Boston Red Stockings

Last MLB appearance
- August 31, 1878, for the Boston Red Caps

MLB statistics
- Batting average: .271
- Hits: 449
- Runs batted in: 215
- Stats at Baseball Reference

Teams
- National Association of Base Ball Players Philadelphia Athletics (1868–1870) League player Boston Red Stockings / Red Caps (1871–1878)

Career highlights and awards
- National Association pennant: 1872, 1873, 1874, 1875; National League pennant: 1877, 1878

Harry C. Schafer (August 14, 1846 – February 28, 1935) was an American professional baseball player who played for eight seasons in Major League Baseball. He played for the Boston Red Stockings in the National Association for five seasons, and remained with the franchise for three additional years when it joined the National League in 1876 as the Boston Red Caps. He played third base for much of his career.

== Career ==
In the National Association, Schafer was a durable player who played in every game in the Red Stockings' first four seasons, earning at least a share of the league lead in games played in 1873 and 1874. Schafer hit .288 in 1872, and had an above average fielding percentage. He was a member of the Red Stockings teams that won four consecutive National Association championships from 1872 to 1875.

While playing for the renamed Red Caps in 1876, the first year of the National League, Schafer again led the league in games played. He played in only half of the Red Caps' games in 1877, and was moved to right field for the season, but was nevertheless part of a team that won the National League championship. In his final season, 1878, he played in only two games for a Red Caps team that won a second consecutive league championship. Schafer had a career batting average of .271, and was a part of six championship teams in his eight seasons in the majors.

According to the Sporting News's 2008 Complete Baseball Record Book, he is credited with recording four outfield assists in an 1877 game, a National League record. The accuracy of this record has been called into question by statisticians. Modern sources, including those on the official website of Major League Baseball, only credit Schafer with a single outfield assist for the 1877 season and four outfield assists for his entire career.

Schafer died on February 28, 1935, at the age of 88 in Philadelphia.

Records
| Preceded by Phonney Martin | Oldest recognized verified living baseball player May 24, 1933 – February 28, 1935 | Succeeded by George Wright |
