= Jim Clinton =

American baseball player (1850–1921)

- Outfielder
- Born: August 10, 1850; New York, New York, U.S.
- Died: September 3, 1921 (aged 71); Kings Park, New York, U.S.
- Batted: Right Threw: Right

MLB debut
- May 18, 1872, for the Brooklyn Eckford

Last MLB appearance
- July 15, 1886, for the Baltimore Orioles

MLB statistics
- Batting average: .255
- On-base percentage: .297
- Slugging percentage: .311
- Stats at Baseball Reference

Teams
- Brooklyn Eckfords (1872); Elizabeth Resolutes (1873); Brooklyn Atlantics (1874–1875); Louisville Grays (1876); Worcester Ruby Legs (1882); Baltimore Orioles (1883–1884); Cincinnati Red Stockings (1885); Baltimore Orioles (1886)

Career highlights and awards
- American Association batting average champ (1883); Oldest player in the National League (1882); Oldest player in the American Association (1883–1886)

James Lawrence Clinton (August 10, 1850 – September 3, 1921), nicknamed "Big Jim", was an American outfielder in Major League Baseball. He played ten seasons in three major leagues. He also managed the Brooklyn Eckfords for a short time in 1872, losing all 11 games he managed. Following his playing career, Clinton managed minor league teams in Birmingham, Nashville, and Manchester and worked at a Brooklyn hotel. In 1896 he earned $10,000 from the sale of four lots in Oakland, California he had purchased with teammate John Farrow during their playing days. By 1920, Clinton was an inmate of the Kings Park Psychiatric Center. He died there on September 3, 1921.
