= Cincinnati Red Stockings =

First professional baseball team

The Cincinnati Red Stockings of 1869 were baseball's first all-professional team, with ten salaried players. The Cincinnati Base Ball Club formed in 1866 and fielded competitive teams in the National Association of Base Ball Players (NABBP) 1867–1870, a time of a transition that ambitious Cincinnati businessmen and ballplayer Harry Wright shaped as much as anyone. Major League Baseball recognized those events officially by sponsoring a centennial of professional baseball in 1969.

Thanks partly to their on-field success and the continental scope of their tours, the Red Stockings established styles in team uniforms and team nicknames that have some currency even in the 21st century. They also established the color red as the color of Cincinnati (continuing with the modern Cincinnati Reds), and they were the origin of the "Boston Red Stockings", a franchise now known as the Atlanta Braves.

== Baseball club ==
The Cincinnati Base Ball Club, or simply Cincinnati Club, was established July 23, 1866, at a downtown law office, drawing up a constitution and by-laws and electing officers including Alfred T. Goshorn as president. A few years later Goshorn earned international fame as Director-General of the (U.S.) Centennial Exposition held 1876 in Philadelphia. Founding member George B. Ellard also led the Union Cricket Club, and the relationship between them proved decisive for the baseball club's success.

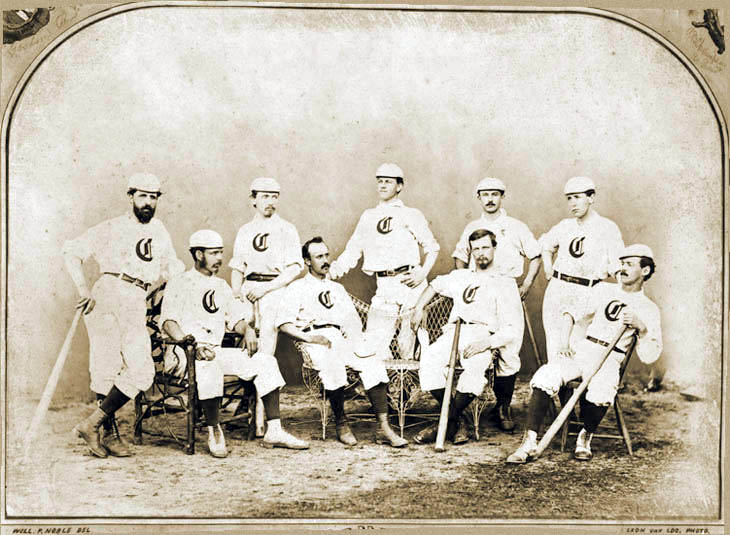
The Cincinnati Red Stockings in 1868, one year before they turned professional.

The ball club's first home field was at a location stated as "the foot of Ninth Street, in the Mill Creek bottoms."[Cincinnati Enquirer, October 4, 1939, p. 32]

After playing four matches that first summer, Cincinnati joined the NABBP for 1867 and concluded an agreement to play at the Union Cricket Club grounds (just west of Lincoln Park, a site now occupied by Cincinnati Union Terminal). George Ellard's son says that "a great number of the cricket club members" joined and so "the team was greatly strengthened and interest in baseball gained a new impetus." Plans for a new clubhouse and "more substantical" enclosing fence were approved in April and the commercial basis was approved in June: members of both clubs admitted free to all matches; otherwise "ten cents for home matches and twenty-five cents for foreign matches. Ladies free." (Ellard 23–27).

The team was soon nicknamed "Red Stockings" in reference to the main feature of the uniforms designed by Ellard; long stockings were then a novelty in team uniforms.

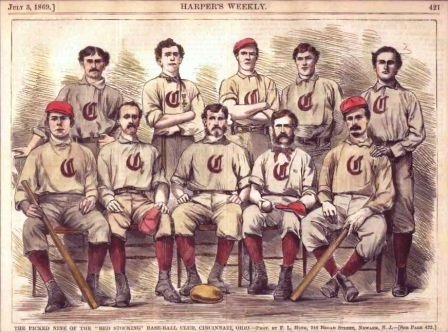
Harpers Weekly representation of the Cincinnati Red Stockings, based on the team photo

Harry Wright had migrated from New York in 1866 for a job as "club pro" at the Union Cricket Club. Next year he picked up similar baseball duties, but the lingo is commonly stretched to call him a baseball "manager" from that time. His first team may have been local to a man, but he both developed and imported players to represent the club in competitive play for the 1868 season. The first team won 16 matches with regional opponents, losing only to the touring Nationals from Washington. As for most hosts on that tour, it was a "bad loss" on the scorecard but an instructive one for Cincinnati: the players, the club, the fans, and perhaps the local newspapers. Everyone learned advanced points of play and, from their different perspectives, witnessed the gulf in playing strength.

About half of the 1868 Red Stockings were eastern imports, presumably compensated somehow. The two leading batsmen, John Hatfield and Fred Waterman, arrived from the New York Mutuals, one of the strongest teams anywhere and another team pushing the bounds of the amateur code. Asa Brainard had been the Brooklyn Excelsiors' regular pitcher for four seasons, succeeded in 1867 by Candy Cummings. Catcher Doug Allison was from the Geary club of Philadelphia, one of the stronger clubs in that city. There was one local recruit, too, from the rival Buckeye club: Charlie Gould at first base. Harry Wright remained the first pitcher, sharing that position and second base with Brainard, and three other incumbents remained in the outfield and at shortstop. The 1868 team played a heavy schedule including a late eastern tour, once again dominating the western teams but losing seven of 43 matches in all.

== First professional team ==
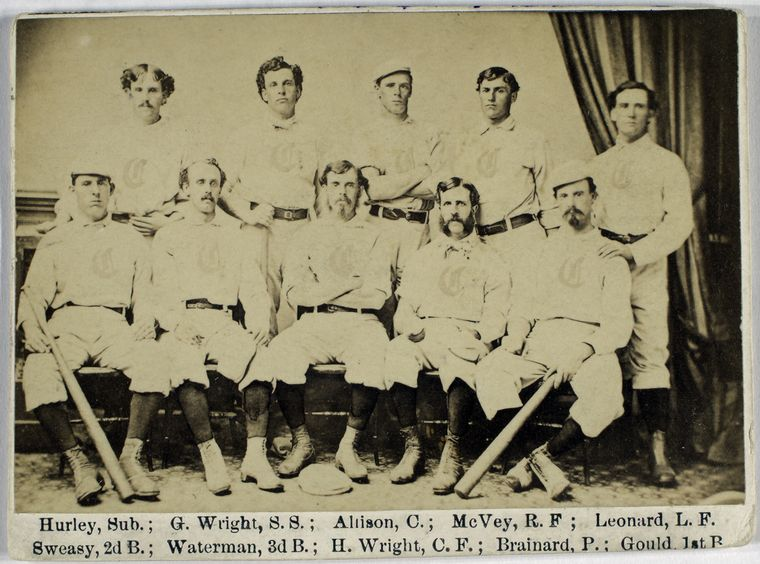
Cincinnati Red Stockings in 1869.

When the NABBP permitted professional members for 1869, Harry Wright and probably George Ellard organized a fully professional team: ten men on salary for eight months, March 15 to November 15. Wright played center field and coordinated the team defense, a novelty from any position. Younger brother and shortstop George Wright, new to the team in 1869, was its best player, maybe the best of his time.

The professional Cincinnati Red Stockings played their first game May 4, 1869, with a 45–9 win over the Great Westerns of Cincinnati. The team won 57 games and lost zero, counting only matches with Association clubs. They played over 60 games counting outside teams. Their commercial tour of continental scope, visiting both Boston and San Francisco, was unprecedented and may be essentially unrepeated. The first season ended November 6 at home with the Cincinnatis beating the Mutuals of New York 17–8.

With the same regular nine, the 1870 team continued to win regularly, perhaps 24 games before losing 8–7 in eleven innings to the Brooklyn Atlantics in Brooklyn, June 14. The Red Stockings remained one of the few strongest teams on the field, losing only six games, but attendance declined badly, especially at home.

== Perfect season ==
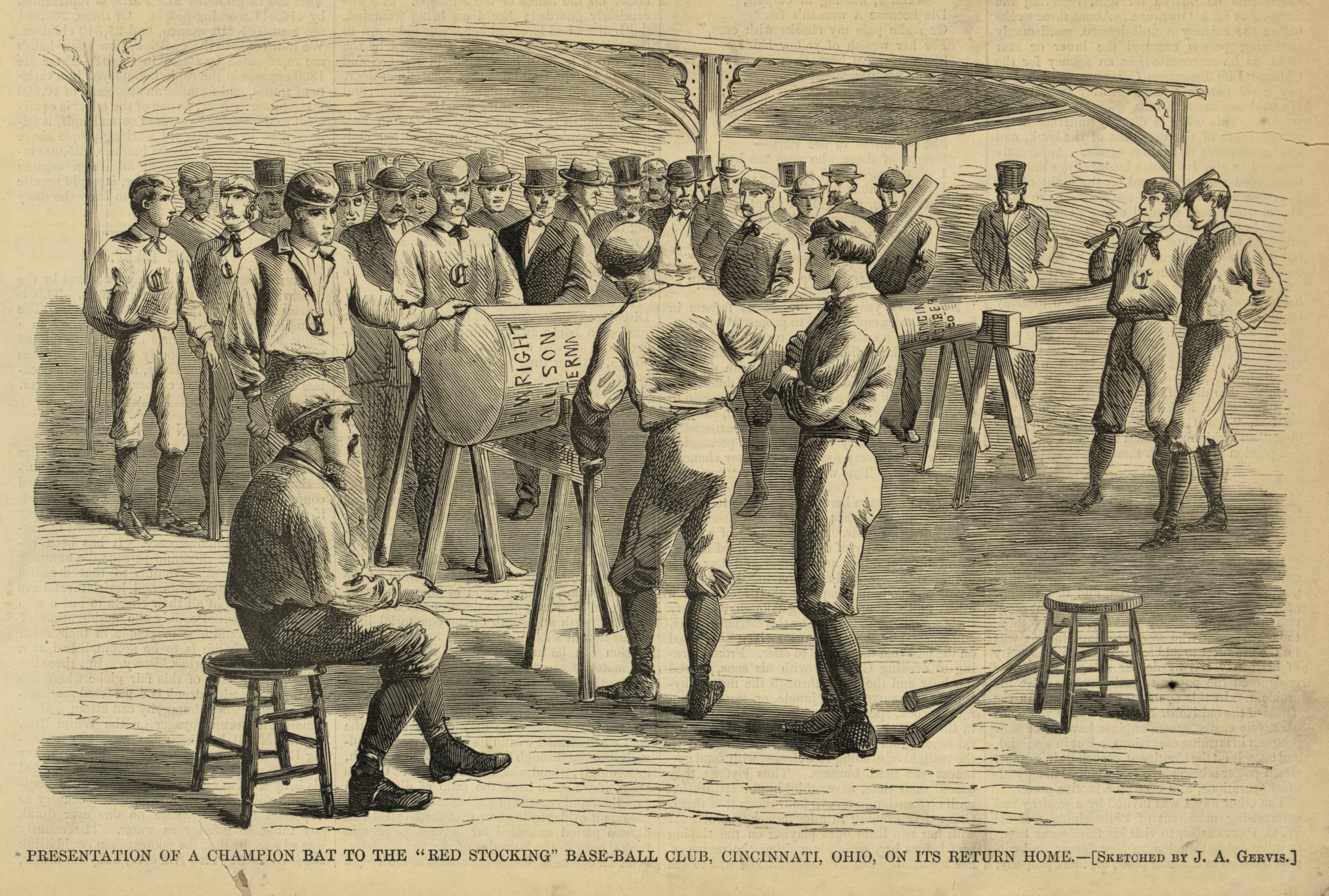
Presentation of a champion bat to the Red Stockings upon return in 1869.

In 1869, the Red Stockings posted a perfect 57–0 record, the only perfect season in professional baseball history. This was the first team to play on the East and West coasts in the same season. More than 2,000 people greeted the team when it arrived in San Francisco at 10:00 p.m. "They really helped nationalize the game and put Cincinnati on the map as a baseball town," said Greg Rhodes, a Reds historian who wrote The First Boys of Summer (Road West Publishing Company, 1994), along with Cincinnati Enquirer reporter John Erardi, about the 1869–1870 Red Stockings.

== 1870–1871 ==
On June 14, 1870, after 81 consecutive wins since assembling as the first openly professional team, the Cincinnati Red Stockings lost 8–7 to the Brooklyn Atlantics before a crowd of 20,000 at the Capitoline Grounds. Bob Ferguson scored the winning run in the 11th inning on a hit by pitcher George Zettlein.

The Executive Board now led by President A.P.C. Bonte recommended on November 21, 1870, that the club not employ a nine for 1871, for that had become too expensive. The spokesmen anticipated "a development of the amateur talent of our club, such as has not been displayed since we employed professionals." The officers subsequently decided to disband the company (the players having disbanded via the market) and a public meeting of the members put that decision into effect.

Harry Wright was hired by Boston businessman Ivers Whitney Adams to organize a new pro club in Boston. Wright persuaded four Cincinnati teammates to join the 1871 Boston Red Stockings in the first professional league, as it turned out. Ex-Cincinnati Red Stockings moved around some (see the note on Team members) but Boston retained both Wright brothers throughout the five years of the National Association.

The current Cincinnati Reds club identifies itself with the Cincinnati Red Stockings, despite reorganization and defections in the early years.

The distinct Boston Red Stockings, beginning business with half of the Cincinnati team, both followed the young tradition and spread it to Boston. Eventually, the Boston Red Stockings evolved into the Boston Braves; the club is now based in Atlanta, and retain red as one of their uniform colors. The Boston Red Sox, established in 1901, adopted their version of the old nickname in 1908.

== Players ==
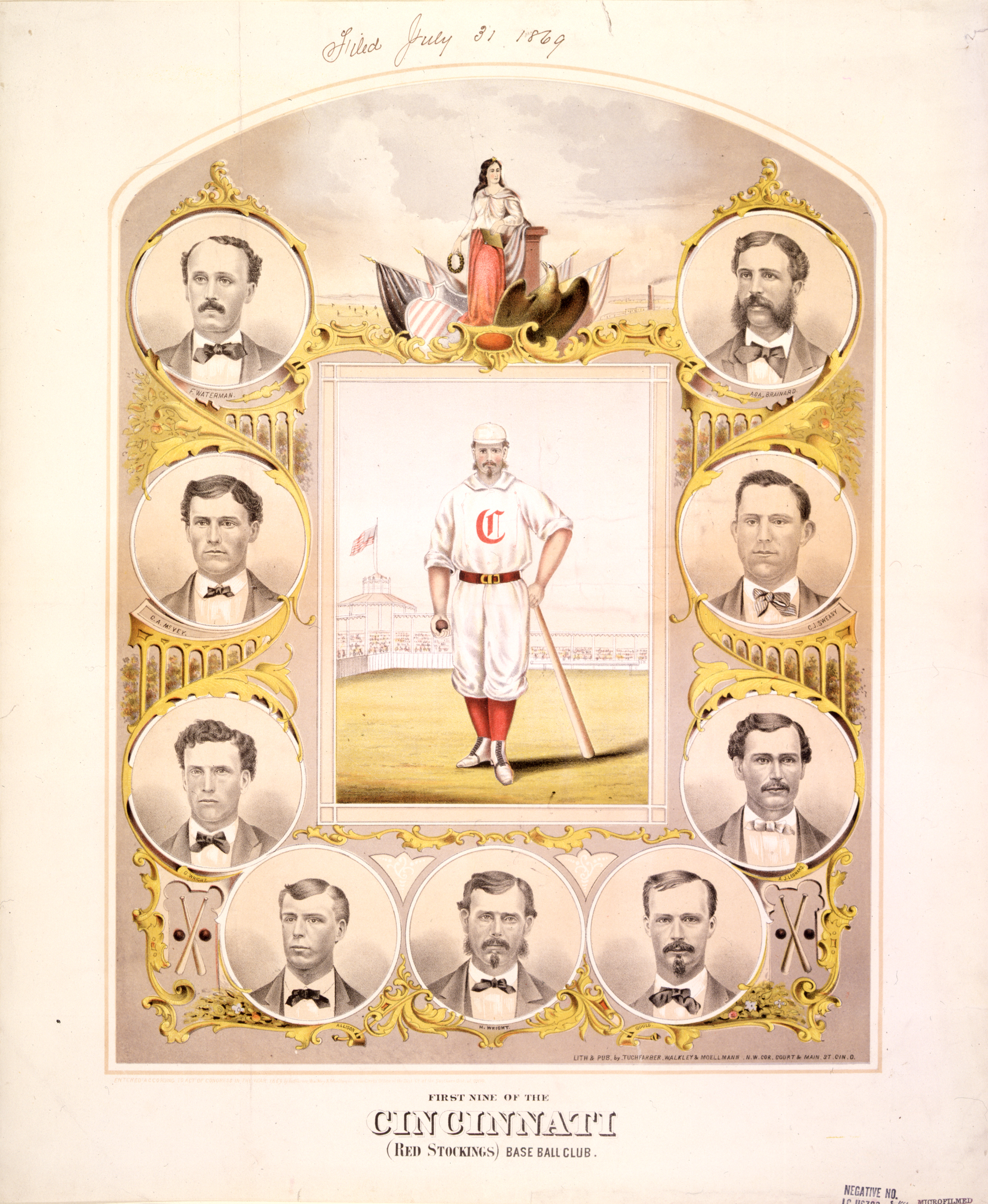
An 1869 lithograph of the Red Stockings' "First Nine".

Ten men composed the 1869 team and the First Nine returned for 1870 in the same roles.

- Asa Brainard, pitcher
- Doug Allison, catcher
- Charlie Gould, first base
- Charlie Sweasy, second base
- Fred Waterman, third base
- George Wright, shortstop
- Andy Leonard, left field
- Harry Wright, center field, manager
- Cal McVey, right field
- Dick Hurley, substitute

From 1867 Harry Wright fulfilled the duties of modern field managers, general managers, and traveling secretaries. In 1868 he and Brainard shared the pitcher and second base positions with Allison, Gould, and Waterman already manning the other bases. For the crosstown rival Buckeye club, Sweasy and Leonard played second and third with Hurley a substitute. Among them only Gould was a Cincinnati native; the others were from the East, presumably compensated somehow by club members if not by the clubs. (The Association first permitted professional clubs for 1869.) Meanwhile, George Wright and McVey played in New York and Indianapolis, primarily at shortstop and pitcher.

For 1871 the Nine split between two teams in the new all-professional National Association: Gould, the Wright brothers, and McVey with the Boston Red Stockings; Brainard, Allison, Sweasy, Waterman, and Leonard with the Washington Olympics. Substitute Hurley is also a "major leaguer" for his brief play with the Olympics in 1872, although that club went out of business midseason and he did not return to the league. The leading substitute in the second season, Harry Deane joined the Fort Wayne Kekiongas in 1871 and later played a full season regularly.

Andy Leonard rejoined Gould, the Wrights, and McVey in Boston for 1872, the first of four consecutive championship seasons there. After one miss Harry won his last two championships as a non-playing manager in 1877–1878 with Leonard and brother George still among his regulars. Gould and McVey left in 1873, although McVey returned for 1874–75 only.

== Record ==
Before Cincinnati hired its team for the 1869 season, the strongest clubs were located from Washington to Troy, New York. In 1867 and 1868, Cincinnati was beaten only by clubs from that eastern corridor, winning 16 and 29 games without defeat against western opponents.

Year	Games	Won	Lost	Tied	Rank in games (or wins)
1867	18	17	1	0	16 (10th in wins)
1868	43	36	7	0	3 (4th)
1869	65	65	0	0	1 (1st)
1870	74	67	6	1	3 (2nd)

Championship matches with professional teams 1869–1870

Year	Games	Won	Lost	Tied	Rank in games (or wins)
1869	19	19	0	0	8 (1st in wins)
1870	34	27	6	1	4 (2nd)
