= Walter Coleman =

American baseball player (1873–1925)

- Pitcher
- Born: June 13, 1873; Lee's Summit, Missouri, U.S.
- Died: November 20, 1925 (aged 52); Bunceton, Missouri, U.S.
- Batted: Unknown Threw: Left

MLB debut
- September 25, 1895, for the St. Louis Browns

Last MLB appearance
- September 25, 1895, for the St. Louis Browns

MLB statistics
- Win–loss record: 0–1
- Earned run average: 13.50
- Strikeouts: 5
- Stats at Baseball Reference

Teams
- St. Louis Browns (1895)

Walter Lee Coleman (June 13, 1873 – November 20, 1925) was an American left-handed pitcher in Major League Baseball who played briefly for the St. Louis Browns during the 1895 season.

A native of Lee's Summit, Missouri, Coleman entered the majors on September 25, 1895. In a complete game appearance, he was charged with 15 runs (including 12 earned) on 12 hits with eight walks and five strikeouts in 8.0 innings. He took the loss and never appeared in another major league game.

Coleman died at the age of 52 in Bunceton, Missouri.
