= John Hatfield (baseball) =

American baseball player (1847–1909)

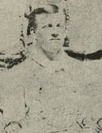
- Left fielder / Infielder
- Born: July 20, 1847; Hoboken, New Jersey, U.S.
- Died: February 20, 1909 (aged 61); Long Island City, Queens, New York, U.S.
- Batted: Unknown Threw: Unknown

MLB debut
- May 18, 1871, for the New York Mutuals

Last MLB appearance
- May 5, 1876, for the New York Mutuals

MLB statistics
- Batting average: .280
- Home runs: 3
- Runs batted in: 146
- Stats at Baseball Reference

Teams
- National Association of Base Ball Players Gotham of New York (1864) Active of New York (1865) New York Mutuals (1866–1867, 1869–1870) Cincinnati Red Stockings (1868) League player New York Mutuals (1871–1876) League manager New York Mutuals (1872–1873)

John Van Buskirk Hatfield (July 20, 1847 – February 20, 1909) was an American professional baseball player in the 1860s and 1870s. He was a batting star and versatile fielder for the Mutual Base Ball Club (New York Mutuals) both before and after spending the 1868 season as left fielder for Harry Wright's Cincinnati Red Stockings. Left field was his primary position during four years as a regular player in the major leagues from 1871. For a few decades after leaving the game he was famous for his "world record" long-distance throw. During an 1868 exhibition at Cincinnati's Union Grounds he threw the baseball 132 yards (396 feet). On October 15, 1872 Hatfield threw a baseball 400 feet.

== Revolver ==
John Hatfield's season in Cincinnati was the last of the amateur era. Like Fred Waterman, another import from New York, he must have been compensated by members of the Cincinnati club if not by the club itself. He was already famous for "revolving" or changing his membership from one club to another. After playing much of two seasons for the New York Gothams to the Actives in September 1865 and played for two other clubs before the end of that season, probably in November. He played mainly for the Actives in 1866 and joined the New York Mutuals for 1867 (Ryczek 1998, 141). That club was always one of the strongest and by Hatfield's time one of the leaders on the frontier of professionalism. Boss Tweed was a member of the club and it was able to compensate some players with city jobs.

Late in 1868 Hatfield missed a match with Cincinnati's intercity rival, the Buckeyes, when a defeat would have required a third game to decide the local championship. After Cincinnati won without him, it came out that he had been benched by his club following a seamy incident the night before. Gamblers had "plied him with liquor, and offered him $200 plus a job in the assessor's office if he would desert the Red Stockings and immediately become captain of the Buckeyes." He had admitted the scheme, but plead intoxication and asked to continue playing with the Red Stockings. They returned him to good standing sometime after the big game.

At the same time, the Buckeyes had hired three outside players for the big game. Like the Red Stockings, they had improved their team before the season by importing some eastern stars. Apparently many player engagements were agreed by contracts of some kind, although little is known about the details. At its annual meeting that December, the National Association expressly permitted professional clubs and thus employment contracts for players.

For the first professional season John Hatfield signed a contract to play with Cincinnati again, but he later signed also with his prior club the Mutuals, and he returned to New York leaving debts in the Queen City.

== Professional ==
Hatfield remained with the Mutuals for his remaining six seasons as a regular player, 1869–1874 including 1870 as team captain. Thereafter he played only two stray games at that level.

John Hatfield died 1909 in Long Island City at age 61. He is buried in Mount Olivet Cemetery, Maspeth. (Both Long Island City and Maspeth are now in the New York City borough of Queens.)
