= Middletown Mansfields =

The Middletown Mansfields were an early baseball team in Middletown, Connecticut that existed from 1866 to 1872.

== Formation ==
In the summer of 1866, a ballclub was established at Middletown's Douglas Pump Company by the factory owner's son, sixteen-year-old Ben Douglas Jr. Douglas named the team after his great-uncle General Joseph Mansfield, a Middletown native and Civil War hero. That year, they lost their first match to the Lincoln club of New Britain by a score of 50–1, but steadily improved thereafter; in 1869, Mansfield put up a 8–2 record, all against other Connecticut clubs. The following year, Middletown ventured outside the Nutmeg State to take on such top pro clubs as Athletic of Philadelphia, Mutual of New York and the Star Club of Brooklyn. With a final record of 21–13, Mansfield was crowned amateur champions of Connecticut.

The following year (which was also the first season of the all-professional National Association), local brick factory owner Dewitt Clinton Sage presented the Mansfields with a portion of his property "near the shirt factory, five minutes walk from the McDonough House (famous hotel on Main Street), for their free use as a base ball ground for five years." The Mansfield Club Grounds had an especially convenient location, as the Valley Railroad ran right by the field. The grandstand held about 800 people, and around 650 were attendance as the Mansfields played their first game there on June 9, 1871, a 30–14 loss to the Brooklyn Atlantics.

== Professional ==
When the 1872 season dawned, the Mansfields fully expected to remain an amateur club; they had played matches against pro teams on occasion, but had never beaten one. Still, Douglas was negotiating with Harry Wright, manager of the powerful Boston Red Stockings, to bring Boston to Middletown for a few games; Wright advised Douglas that if Middletown truly wanted to play professional clubs then they should pay the $10 entry fee and join the National Association. To the league's apparent chagrin, the Mansfields did just that and joined the now eleven-team loop.

The Mansfield club was managed by catcher John Clapp and featured such players as future Hall of Fame outfielder Jim O'Rourke, then a 21-year-old rookie. He batted .307 in 23 games at shortstop, catcher, and third base. Also on the team was the star pitcher for the undefeated 1869 Cincinnati Red Stockings, Asa Brainard (past his prime at age 31, he pitched only two games for Middletown and lost them both) and another 21-year-old rookie, Tim Murnane, who led the team with a .360 average (sixth-best in the whole NA). But with Brainard coming up lame, Middletown was lacking in the pitching department, usually handing the ball to Clytus "Cy" Bentley. Also just 21, Bentley won only two of his 17 decisions with a 6.06 ERA, worst in the league among hurlers with at least 100 innings pitched. (Tragically, Bentley died of consumption the following winter, on February 26, 1873.)

Clearly, Mansfield did not have the talent to compete with the big professional clubs; a pair of June victories over the woeful (3–26) Brooklyn Eckfords bumped their record up to five wins against nine losses, but Middletown would lose their last ten contests to finish 5–19, in eighth place. (Their swan song was an 11–8 loss to the Brooklyn Atlantics in front of 600 people in Middletown on August 9, 1872.) Ultimately, the obstacles for a small city like Middletown (with a population of less than seven thousand) to operate and compete against big-city teams were too daunting, so on August 14, 1872, the Mansfield club closed their books and ended their only major league season.

Pro baseball would not return to Middletown for nearly four decades, until the Middletown Jewels played in the four-team Connecticut Association in 1910. The Jewels finished 26–24, good enough for second place, but disappeared along with the rest of the circuit at season's end. Middletown had not had a professional ballclub since, but the Mansfield name lives on as a vintage base ball team, which plays the game by 19th century rules and wears hand-made uniforms similar to the original team's 1870 outfit.

== See also ==
- 1872 Middletown Mansfields season
