= Doug Allison =

American baseball player (1846–1916)

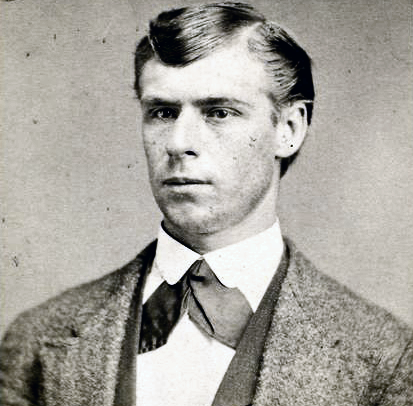
- Catcher
- Born: July 12, 1846; Philadelphia, Pennsylvania, U.S.
- Died: December 19, 1916 (aged 70); Washington, D.C., U.S.
- Batted: Right Threw: Right

Major-league debut
- May 5, 1871, for the Washington Olympics

Last major-league appearance
- July 13, 1883, for the Baltimore Orioles

Major-league statistics
- Batting average: .271
- Home runs: 2
- Runs batted in: 139
- Stats at Baseball Reference

Teams
- National Association of Base Ball Players Geary of Philadelphia (1868) Cincinnati Red Stockings (1868–1870) League player Washington Olympics (1871) Troy Haymakers (1872) Brooklyn Eckfords (1872) Elizabeth Resolutes (1873) New York Mutuals (1873–1874) Hartford Dark Blues (1875–1877) Providence Grays (1878–1879) Baltimore Orioles (1883) League manager Elizabeth Resolutes (1873)

Douglas L. Allison (July 12, 1846 – December 19, 1916) was an American baseball player. He began his professional career as a catcher for the Cincinnati Red Stockings, the first fully professional baseball team. Allison was one of the first catchers to stand directly behind the batter, as a means to prevent baserunners from stealing bases. He was considered a specialist, at a time when some of the better batsmen who manned the position normally rested, or substituted at other fielding positions. Allison became the earliest known player to use a type of baseball glove when he donned buckskin mittens to protect his hands in 1870.

Prior to his baseball career, Allison served as a private in Company L of the 192nd Pennsylvania Infantry Regiment during the American Civil War. His brother, Art Allison, also played in the major leagues.

== Career ==
=== Cincinnati Red Stockings ===
Not quite 22 years old, Allison moved to Cincinnati for the 1868 season and played for the Cincinnati Red Stockings managed by Harry Wright. Open professionalism was one year away but the long move from Philadelphia, where he worked as a bricklayer, suggests that Allison was somehow compensated by club members, if not by the club. Cincinnati fielded a strong team that year, with five of the famous team already in place. Allison was a defensive specialist, whose job was simply to catch pitcher Asa Brainard.

Most catchers of Allison's era stood twenty to twenty-five feet behind the batter. His technique of moving closer to the batter proved effective in curtailing baserunners from stealing bases. In the 1860s, it was common for teams to score fifty or sixty runs a game, but as the technique of moving closer to the batter became more widespread among other catchers, run production began to plummet.

When the National Association of Base Ball Players (NABBP) permitted professionalism, the Red Stockings hired five incumbents, including Allison, along with five new men to complete its roster, the first team that consisted of salaried players. A few of the others had previously played some catcher, but Allison filled the role in almost every game. Cincinnati toured the continent undefeated in 1869 and may have been the strongest team in 1870, but the club dropped professional base ball after the second season.

=== Later career ===
Harry Wright was hired to organize a new team in Boston, where he signed three teammates for 1871. The other five regulars including Allison signed with Nick Young's Washington Olympics, an established club that also joined the new, entirely professional National Association (NA). The five former Red Stockings led the Olympics to a respectable finish in the inaugural NA season.

Later, Doug Allison played in the Major Leagues with the Troy Haymakers in 1872, the Brooklyn Eckfords in 1872, the Elizabeth Resolutes in 1873, the New York Mutuals from 1873 to 1874, the Hartford Dark Blues from 1875 to 1877, the Providence Grays from 1878 to 1879, and one game with the Baltimore Orioles of the American Association in 1883.

== Later life ==
Allison was reported playing for a post office team in 1882. Thirty-four years later he died in a car accident in Washington, D.C., at age 70, en route to his job at the Post Office Department. He is buried in Rock Creek Cemetery, Washington.
