= Elizabeth Resolutes =

Defunct baseball team from Elizabeth, New Jersey

Information
- Location: Elizabeth, New Jersey
- Founded: 1873
- Folded: 1873
- Former league: National Association
- Former ballpark: Waverly Fairgrounds
- Manager: Doug Allison

The Elizabeth Resolutes were a 19th-century professional baseball team based in Elizabeth, New Jersey. They were a member of the National Association of Professional Base Ball Players for the 1873 season, and played their home games at Waverly Fairgrounds. Though based in the vicinity of Elizabeth, they were usually listed in game reports as simply "Resolute" or "the Resolutes", per the style of the day. "Elizabeth Resolutes" is modern nomenclature.

== Team history ==
=== Amateur years (mid-1860s–1872) ===
The Resolutes started as an amateur team in the mid-1860s. They built a successful team by assembling the best local players, especially from their nearby rival Irvington Athletic Club. This culminated in winning the New Jersey state championship in 1870. After almost a decade of amateur status, the Resolutes paid $10 to join the National Association of Professional Base Ball Players, making them the first professional team in the state.

=== The professional year (1873) ===
The 1873 season went terribly for the Resolutes. The club played just 23 games during its lone professional season, finishing with two victories against 21 defeats. They lost all eight of their home games. The team would have finished last in the National Association had it not been for the Baltimore Marylands, who played only six games and lost all of them. The Resolutes also had poor attendance, due in part to a failure to properly advertise their games.

Across the Resolutes' 23 games in 1873, they allowed an average of 13 runs per game while averaging only slightly above 4 runs scored per game. The Resolutes played in the first ever professional baseball doubleheader, playing twice against the Boston Red Stockings on July 4th of that year. Their biggest win of the season was an 11-2 victory over Boston in the first game of that doubleheader. Their biggest loss was a 32-3 drubbing in the second game of the doubleheader. The team's final game was an August 7th loss to the New York Mutuals, 20-3. Their season ended nearly four months before the NA's last game of the 1873 season.

The Resolutes' leading hitter was Art Allison, who batted a career-high .320 while playing all 23 games, mostly in the outfield. Hugh Campbell was the pitcher of record for both of the Resolutes' wins and 16 of their losses; he also played at first base and in the outfield.

=== Legacy ===
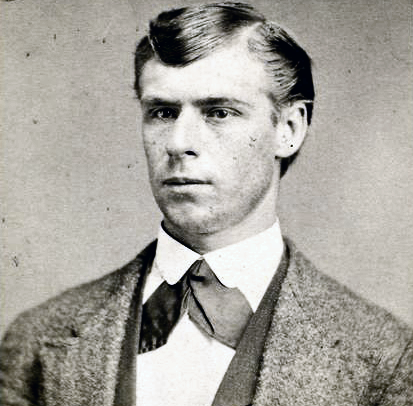
Doug Allison, catcher and manager for the Resolutes, went on to play four seasons in the National League

A few Resolutes found success after their time in Elizabeth. Art Allison would go on to play 31 career games with the Louisville Grays in the inaugural season of the National League. Doug Allison, Art's brother and the Resolutes' primary catcher, would go on to play nearly 100 National League games. Workhorse pitcher Hugh Campbell, on the other hand, never again played professional baseball.

Although Philadelphia and New York City teams occasionally played games in New Jersey to circumvent blue laws that forbade professional baseball on Sundays, the Resolutes and the 1915 Newark Peppers of the Federal League are the only major-league teams to be based in New Jersey.

The Resolutes were the first professional baseball team in New Jersey, and the state has been home to multiple minor league and independent league teams since then. Even Elizabeth itself has been home to a few teams after the Resolutes, though they were all shortlived, with the last Elizabeth professional baseball team folding in 1909.

A modern vintage baseball team took up the legacy of the Resolutes, beginning play in 2000.

== See also ==
- 1873 Elizabeth Resolutes season
