= New York Mutuals =

Baseball club

Information
- League: National League (1876); National Association (professional) (1871–1875); National Association (amateur) (1858–1870)
- Location: Hoboken, New Jersey (1857–1867); Brooklyn, New York (1868–1876)
- Ballpark: Union Grounds (1868–1876); Elysian Fields (1857–1867)
- Founded: 1857
- Folded: 1876
- Nickname: Mutual Base Ball Club of New York
- League championships: National League pennants: 0; National Association pennants: 0; National Association (amateur) pennants: 2 (1858, 1868)
- Colors: Navy, white
- Ownership: Mutual Hook and Ladder Co Number 1 (1857–1864) William M. Tweed (1864–1871) Bill Cammeyer (1871–1876)
- Manager: Bill Cammeyer (1876); Dick Higham & Tom Carey (1874–1875); Joe Start (1873); John Hatfield (1872–1873); Dickey Pearce (1872); Bob Ferguson (1871)

The Mutual Base Ball Club of New York was an American baseball club established in 1857, the year of the first baseball convention. The Mutuals just missed out on being a founding member of the National Association of Base Ball Players that year, but later became a charter member of both the National Association of Professional Base Ball Players, or "NA", the first professional league, in 1871, and then the National League in 1876.

== History ==
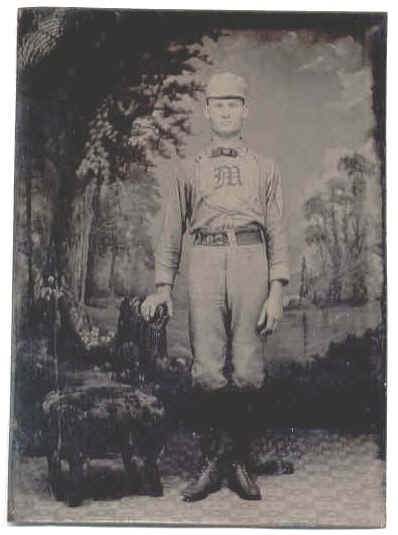
Picture of Mutuals player, likely Edward Ward

The team was initially formed from firefighters of New York's Mutual Hook and Ladder Company Number One. Boss Tweed took control of the Mutuals in 1864 and operated the team until his arrest following the deadly riots of 1871 and the public exposing of his corruption that followed. During Tweed's tenure as owner, he and the Mutuals have been given credit for initiating the concept of spring training when Tweed sent the team to New Orleans to train for the 1869 season.

The Mutual club initially played its home games at Elysian Fields in Hoboken, with the New York Knickerbockers and many other Manhattan clubs, but moved to the enclosed Union Grounds in Brooklyn in 1868. Though historically identified as "New York", they never staged any home games in Manhattan, which before 1898 was considered to be "New York City."

The Mutuals chose open professionalism in 1869–70 after NABBP liberalization. They joined the NA for its 1871 to 1875 duration. In 1876, the Chicago White Stockings initiated the National League and recruited its members from West to East, partly to wrest control of professional baseball from Eastern interests. The Mutuals were one of eight charter members, six of whom were from the National Association. Weak (sixth place at 21–35) and cash-poor, the club refused to complete its playing obligations in the West; and was expelled.

On May 13, 1876, the Mutuals executed the first triple play in major-league history in a game against the Hartford Dark Blues.

Union Grounds proprietor William Cammeyer, often listed today as the Mutual club owner, signed the Hartford Dark Blues to play at his Union Grounds in 1877. The team was effectively a one-year replacement for the defunct Mutuals, and was sometimes called "Hartford of Brooklyn".

== Record ==
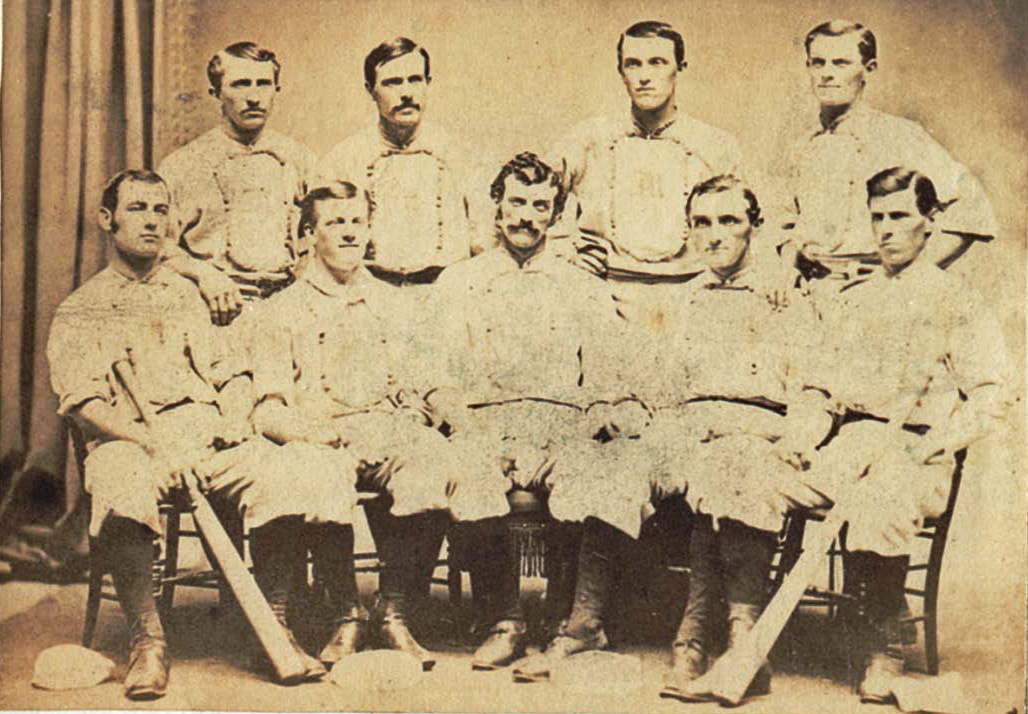
1870 New York Mutuals team photograph

Year	Won	Lost	Tied	Games	Rank in games (or in wins)
1858	11	1	—	12	2 (1st in wins)
1859	3	5	—	8	6
1860	1	8	2	11	5
1861	8	2	—	10	2 (tie 1st in wins)
1862	8	5	—	13	2 (2nd in wins)
1863	10	4	—	14	1 (tie 1st in wins)
1864	21	3	—	24	1 (1st in wins)
1865	12	4	—	16	5 (tie 4th in wins)
1866	10	2	—	12	15 (tie 5th in wins)
1867	23	6	1	30	4 (4th in wins)
1868	31	10	—	41	5 (5th in wins)
1869	37	16	—	53	3 (5th in wins)
1870	68	17	3	88	1 (1st in wins)
Championship matches with professional teams, 1869–1870
1869	11	15	—	26	1 (5th in wins)
1870	29	15	3	47	1 (1st in wins)
League record
1871	16	17	—	33	1 (4th place)
1872	34	20	2	56	2 (3rd place)
1873	29	24	—	53	4 (4th place)
1874	42	23	—	65	2 (2nd place)
1875	30	38	3	71	4 (7th place)
1876	21	35	1	57	8 (6th place)

Source for season records: Rio (2008).

== Franchise leaders ==
Batting

- Hits – Joe Start (387)
- Runs – Joe Start (264)
- At bats – Joe Start (1314)
- Games – Joe Start (273)
- Doubles – Joe Start and Dave Eggler (40)
- Home runs – Joe Start (8)
- RBIs – Joe Start (187)
- Stolen bases – Dave Eggler (36)

Pitching

- Wins – Bobby Mathews (100)
- ERA – Bobby Mathews (2.41)
- Strikeouts – Bobby Mathews (95)
- Innings – Bobby Mathews (1,647 2/3)

== Notable alumni ==
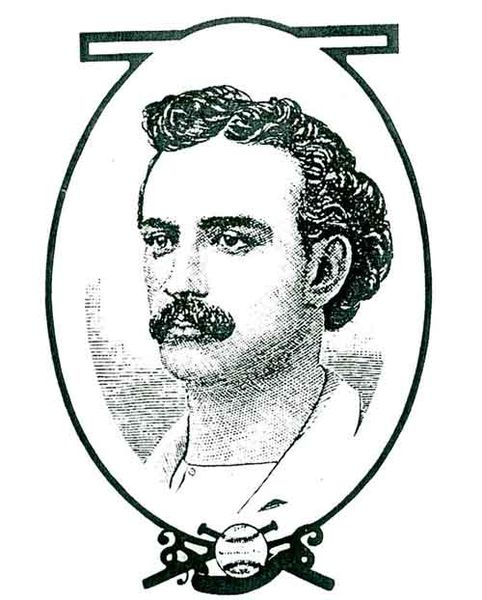
Lip Pike

- Lip Pike, major league baseball 4× home run champion
- Rynie Wolters, first Dutch professional baseball player

== Baseball Hall of Famers ==
New York Mutuals Hall of Famers
Inductee	Position	Tenure	Inducted
Candy Cummings	P	1872	1939

== See also ==
- New York Mutuals all-time roster
- 1871 New York Mutuals season
- 1872 New York Mutuals season
- 1873 New York Mutuals season
- 1874 New York Mutuals season
- 1875 New York Mutuals season
- 1876 New York Mutuals season
