= 1873 in baseball =

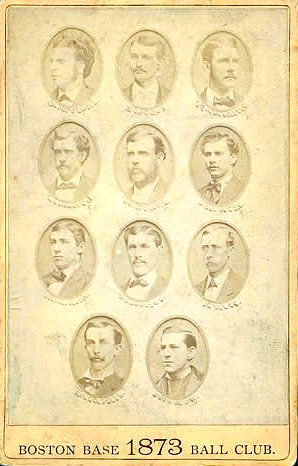
1873 Boston Red Stockings team picture

The following are the baseball events of the year 1873 throughout the world.

== Champions ==
- National Association: Boston Base Ball Club

== Statistical leaders ==
National Association
Stat	Player	Total
AVG	Ross Barnes (BOS)	.431
HR	Lip Pike (BAL)	4
RBI	Deacon White (BOS)	77
W	Al Spalding (BOS)	41
ERA	Cherokee Fisher (PHA)	1.81
K	Bobby Mathews (NY)	79

== National Association final standings ==
National Association	W	L	T	Pct.	GB
Boston Red Stockings	43	16	1	.725	—
Philadelphia White Stockings	36	17	—	.679	4
Baltimore Canaries	34	22	1	.605	7½
Philadelphia Athletics	28	23	1	.548	11
New York Mutuals	29	24	—	.547	11
Brooklyn Atlantics	17	37	1	.318	23½
Washington Blue Legs	8	31	—	.205	25
Elizabeth Resolutes	2	21	—	.087	23
Baltimore Marylands	0	6	—	.000	16½

== Notable seasons ==
- Boston Red Stockings second baseman Ross Barnes leads the NA with 138 hits, 43 stolen bases, 125 runs scored, a .431 batting average, a 1.080 OPS, and a 207 OPS+.
- Boston Red Stockings pitcher Al Spalding has a record of 41–14, leading the NA with 41 wins and 496.2 innings pitched. His 50 strikeouts rank second in the league. He has a 2.99 earned run average and a 115 ERA+.

== Events ==
=== January–March ===
- March 3 – For the first time, the NA adopts a standardized ball to be used in all league games.

=== April–June ===
- May 14 – Nearly 5,000 fans watch the upstart Philadelphia Club defeat the established Athletics 5–4 in 13 innings. Only once before, in 1865, had that many innings been played in one game.
- June 7 – Mutual and Philadelphia combine for 40 errors. The Philadelphias, aided by the Mutuals' 26 miscues, win 12–10.
- June 11 – 10,000 fans are in attendance see Philadelphia score 5 runs in the 7th inning to defeat Athletic 7–5.

=== July–September ===
- July 4 – Leading 11–3 over Resolute of Elizabeth, the Bostons score 21 runs in the bottom of the 9th inning for a 32–3 victory. The home-ahead rule would not be instituted for 6 more years.
- July 22 – Tom Barlow of Atlantic lays down 6 bunts, all for hits, in a game against Lord Baltimore.
- July 24 – Bob Ferguson of the Atlantic is the umpire in a game between Mutual of New York and Lord Baltimore which ends with the Mutuals scoring 3 runs in the bottom of the 9th for an 11–10 victory. Ferguson and Mutual's Nat Hicks get into an altercation with Ferguson breaking Hicks' arm by hitting him with a bat. Ferguson requires a police escort to leave the field and Hicks will be out for 2 months due to the incident.
- August 16 – Boston defeats Philadelphia 11–8 in Chicago in front of several thousand fans. After the game, it is announced that Chicago has signed several players in hopes of placing a team in the NA for the 1874 season.

=== October–December ===
- October 16 – Lord Baltimore turns a triple play in a losing cause against Philadelphia.
- October 22 – Boston wins the pennant for the 2nd year in a row. They clinch on the same date as they had in 1872.
- November 6 – A crosstown benefit game is played between the Philadelphia and Athletic Clubs under a proposed rule of 10 men on the field and 10 innings for a game. The extra player is placed on the infield as a right shortstop and with most observers feeling the extra player unnecessary, the rule is never implemented.

== Births ==
- January 10:
  - Chick Stahl
  - Jack O'Neill
- January 19 – Arlie Pond
- January 23 – Red Donahue
- February 5 – Jack O'Brien
- February 20 – Tom O'Brien
- March 10 – Gene DeMontreville
- March 29 – Duff Cooley
- April 7 – John McGraw
- April 22 – Frank Figgemeier
- May 23 – "Brewery" Jack Taylor
- June 13 – Walter Coleman
- July 11 – Jimmy Slagle
- July 19 – Harry Davis
- August 26 – Chick Fraser
- October 5 – Claude Ritchey
- October 9 – Bill Reidy
- November 4 – Bobby Wallace
- November 10 – Willie McGill
- November 24 – Ed Doheny
- November 29 – Jake Weimer
- December 6 – Harry Wolverton
- December 9 – Oscar Purner
- December 14 – John Anderson

== Deaths ==
- February 26 – Cy Bentley, 22, pitcher and right fielder for the 1872 Middletown Mansfields.
