= 2013 World Baseball Classic – Qualifier 4 =

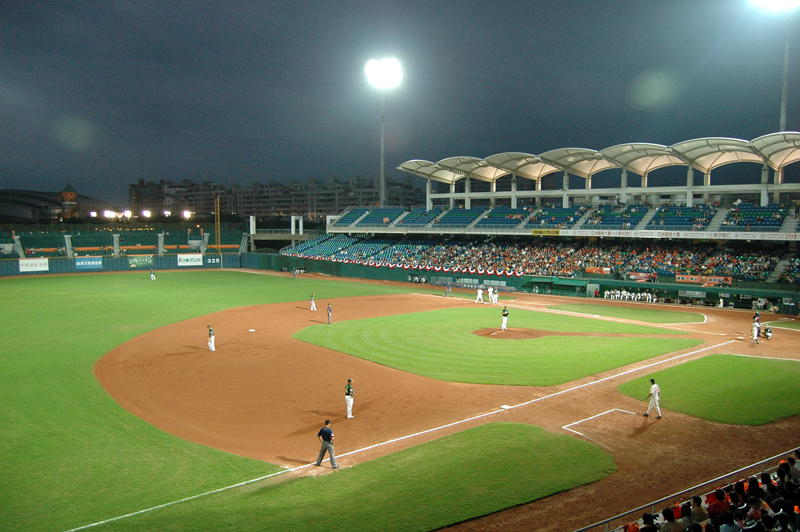
Night view of Taipei County Xinzhuang Baseball Stadium infield

Qualifier 4 of the Qualifying Round of the 2013 World Baseball Classic was held at Xinzhuang Baseball Stadium, New Taipei City, Taiwan from November 15 to 18, 2012.

Qualifier 4 was a modified double-elimination tournament. The winners for the first games matched up in the second game, while the losers faced each other in an elimination game. The winners of the elimination game then played the losers of the non-elimination game in another elimination game. The remaining two teams then played each other to determine the winners of the Qualifier 4.

== Bracket ==
Preliminaries
–	Philippines	8
–	Thailand	2
–	New Zealand	0
–	Chinese Taipei	10
Lower round 1
L1	Thailand	2
L2	New Zealand	12

Semifinals
W1	Philippines	0
W2	Chinese Taipei	16
Lower final
W3	New Zealand	10
L4	Philippines	6

Qualifier
W4	Chinese Taipei	9
W5	New Zealand	0

== Results ==
- All times are Taiwan National Standard Time (UTC+08:00).

=== Philippines 8, Thailand 2 ===
November 15 11:30 at Xinzhuang Baseball Stadium
Team	1	2	3	4	5	6	7	8	9	R	H	E
Philippines	0	0	0	3	1	1	0	3	0	8	12	1
Thailand	1	0	0	0	0	0	0	1	0	2	7	7
WP: Jon Jon Robles (1–0) LP: Kamolphan Kanjanavisut (0–1); Attendance: 923 (7.4%); Umpires: HP − D.J. Reyburn, 1B − Kouichi Tanba, 2B − Mark Ripperger, 3B − David Kulhanek; Boxscore

=== Chinese Taipei 10, New Zealand 0 ===
November 15 18:30 at Xinzhuang Baseball Stadium
Team	1	2	3	4	5	6	7	8	9	R	H	E
New Zealand	0	0	0	0	0	0	0	X	X	0	6	1
Chinese Taipei	0	0	1	1	8	0	X	X	X	10	11	0
WP: Yao-lin Wang (1–0) LP: Lincoln Holdzkom (0–1); Attendance: 9,788 (78.3%); Umpires: HP − John Tumpane, 1B − Mark Ripperger, 2B − David Kulhanek, 3B − Su-won Choi; Notes: Completed early due to 10–run mercy rule after 7 innings. Boxscore

=== New Zealand 12, Thailand 2 ===
November 16 11:30 at Xinzhuang Baseball Stadium
Team	1	2	3	4	5	6	7	8	9	R	H	E
New Zealand	1	4	1	1	2	1	1	1	X	12	14	0
Thailand	0	0	0	0	1	1	0	0	X	2	4	4
WP: Makauley Fox Rolfe (1–0) LP: Nattapong Meeboonrod (0–1); Home runs: NZL: Boss Moanaroa (1); THA: None; Attendance: 1,168 (9.3%); Umpires: HP − Kouichi Tanba, 1B − Su-won Choi, 2B − D.J. Reyburn, 3B − John Tumpane; Notes: Completed early due to 10–run mercy rule after 8 innings. Boxscore

=== Chinese Taipei 16, Philippines 0 ===
November 16 18:30 at Xinzhuang Baseball Stadium
Team	1	2	3	4	5	6	7	8	9	R	H	E
Chinese Taipei	0	0	3	0	8	0	5	X	X	16	14	1
Philippines	0	0	0	0	0	0	0	X	X	0	1	5
WP: Yu-Ching Lin (1–0) LP: Ryuya Ogawa (0–1); Attendance: 10,911 (87.3%); Umpires: HP − Mark Ripperger, 1B − David Kulhanek, 2B − Su-won Choi, 3B − D.J. Reyburn; Notes: Completed early due to 10–run mercy rule after 7 innings. Boxscore

=== New Zealand 10, Philippines 6 ===
November 17 14:00 at Xinzhuang Baseball Stadium
Team	1	2	3	4	5	6	7	8	9	R	H	E
New Zealand	0	0	3	0	3	1	3	0	0	10	12	3
Philippines	0	1	0	0	1	0	0	4	0	6	9	7
WP: John Holdzkom (1–0) LP: Charlie Labrador (0–1) Sv: Lincoln Holdzkom (1); Attendance: 503 (4.0%); Umpires: HP − John Tumpane, 1B − Mark Ripperger, 2B − Su-won Choi, 3B − Kouichi Tanba; Boxscore

=== Chinese Taipei 9, New Zealand 0 ===
November 18 14:00 at Xinzhuang Baseball Stadium
Team	1	2	3	4	5	6	7	8	9	R	H	E
New Zealand	0	0	0	0	0	0	0	0	0	0	4	1
Chinese Taipei	0	1	0	6	0	0	2	0	X	9	8	0
WP: Yao-hsun Yang (1–0) LP: John Holdzkom (1–1); Attendance: 8,163 (65.3%); Umpires: HP − D.J. Reyburn, 1B − John Tumpane, 2B − Kouichi Tanba, 3B − Mark Ripperger; Boxscore

== See also ==
- List of sporting events in Taiwan
