= Lollo =

Lollo is a surname. Notable people with the surname include:

- Lorenzo Lollo (born 1990), Italian football player
- Luciano Lollo (born 1987), Argentine footballer
- Mark Lollo (born 1982), American baseball umpire

== See also ==
- Di Lollo
- Cape Lollo
