= List of Major League Baseball umpires (G–M) =

The following is a list of baseball umpires with surnames beginning with the letters G through M who officiated in Major League Baseball (MLB). The list includes those who worked in any of four 19th-century major leagues (American Association, National Association, Players' League, Union Association), one defunct 20th century major league (Federal League), the currently active Major League Baseball, or either of its leagues (American League, National League) when they maintained separate umpiring staffs. All of the above leagues, with the exception of the National Association, are recognized by MLB’s Special Baseball Records Committee. The NA’s status as a major league is disputed, with some researchers such as those involved with Retrosheet including it in their major league statistics.

== Key ==
Name
| ^ | Currently active |
| * | Hall of Fame inductee, for umpiring |
| § | Hall of Fame inductee, for playing career |
| † | Former major league player |
| ‡ | Substitute umpire (as an active ML player/manager/coach) |

League
| AA | American Association (1882–1891) |
| AL | American League (1901–1999) |
| ANL | American Negro League (1929) |
| ECL | Eastern Colored League (1923–1928) |
| EWL | East–West League (1932) |
| FL | Federal League (1914–1915) |
| MLB | Major League Baseball (2000–present) |
| NA | National Association (1871–1875) |
| NAL | Negro American League (1937–1948) |
| NL | National League (1876–1999) |
| NNL I | Negro National League (1920–1931) |
| NNL II | Negro National League (1933–1948) |
| NSL | Negro Southern League (1932) |
| PL | Players' League (1890) |
| UA | Union Association (1884) |

Years
Years, or range of years, that the umpire was active.

Games
Number of regular season games umpired (through end of 2024). If the umpire has worked in multiple major leagues, the total is inclusive of all leagues.

== Umpires (G–M) ==
=== G ===
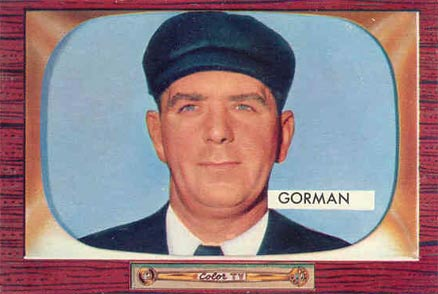
Tom Gorman worked 3805 NL games, and his son Brian worked 3430 games between the NL and MLB

G
| Name | League(s) | Years | Games | Ref(s) |
|---|---|---|---|---|
| John Gaffney | NL, AA, PL | 1884–1894, 1898–1900 | 1107 (Note: 740 (NL, 1884–87, 1891–94, 1898–1900), 229 (AA, 1888–89), 138 (PL, 1890)) | |
| Larry Gallagher | AL | 1979 | 7 | |
| Pud Galvin^{§}†‡ | NL, AA | 1881, 1885–1887, 1889, 1895 | 40 (Note: 38 (NL, 1881, 1886–87, 1889, 1895), 2 (AA, 1885–86)) | |
| Charlie Ganzel†‡ | AA, NL | 1886, 1901 | 2 (Note: 1 (AA, 1886), 1 (NL, 1901)) | |
| Rich Garcia | AL | 1975–1999 | 3398 | |
| Jim Gardner‡ | NL | 1899 | 1 | |
| Jim Garman | NL | 1995 | 5 | |
| Charles Garrigan | NA | 1873 | 2 | |
| Billy Geer†‡ | NA, AA | 1874–1875, 1887 | 8 (Note: 7 (NA, 1874–75), 1 (AA, 1887)) | |
| Harry Geisel | AL | 1925–1942 | 2554 | |
| Billy George‡ | NL | 1889 | 1 | |
| Ed George | AL | 1979 | 1 | |
| Joe Gerhardt‡ | NA | 1875 | 1 | |
| Les German‡ | NL | 1895 | 1 | |
| Pretzels Getzien‡ | NL | 1890 | 1 | |
| Bob Giard | AL | 1978 | 1 | |
| Brian Gibbons | NL | 1994–1999 | 132 | |
| Greg Gibson | NL, MLB | 1997–2022 | 2746 (Note: 136 (NL, 1997–99), 2610 (MLB, 2000–19, 2021–22)) | |
| Tripp Gibson^ | MLB | 2013–present | 1385 | |
| Jim Gifford | NL | 1881 | 3 | |
| Tommy Gill | AA | 1886 | 3 | |
| Tom Gillean | NL | 1879–1880 | 31 | |
| Tony Gisondi | NL | 1991 | 1 | |
| Bill Gleason† | NL, AA | 1877, 1891 | 2 (Note: 1 (NL, 1877), 1 (AA, 1891)) | |
| Jack Gleason‡ | NL | 1877 | 1 | |
| Kid Gleason‡ | NL | 1890, 1892 | 4 | |
| John Glenn†‡ | NA, NL | 1874, 1880 | 7 (Note: 2 (NA, 1874), 5 (NL, 1880)) | |
| Frank Glover | NA | 1873 | 2 | |
| Ed Goeckel | FL | 1914 | 135 | |
| Larry Goetz | NL | 1936–1957 | 3218 | |
| Russ Goetz | AL | 1969–1983 | 2384 | |
| George Gohen | NL | 1893 | 1 | |
| Walt Goldsby‡ | AA | 1888 | 1 | |
| Fred Goldsmith† | NL, AA | 1886, 1888–1889 | 171 (Note: 3 (NL, 1886), 168 (AA, 1888–89)) | |
| Manny Gonzalez^ | MLB | 2010–present | 1610 | |
| Cheever Goodwin | NA | 1871–1872 | 6 | |
| Artie Gore | NL | 1947–1956 | 1464 | |
| Brian Gorman | NL, MLB | 1993–2021 | 3430 (Note: 982 (NL, 1993–99), 2448 (MLB, 2000–19, 2021)) | |
| Tom Gorman† | NL | 1951–1977 | 3805 | |
| Jeff Gosney | MLB | 2014–2015 | 17 | |
| Charlie Gould‡ | NA | 1874–1875 | 8 | |
| Mike Grady‡ | NL, AL | 1895, 1901 | 2 (Note: 1 (NL, 1895), 1 (AL, 1901)) | |
| J. S. Graham | NA | 1871–1872 | 3 | |
| Scott Graham | NL, MLB | 1991, 1995, 2004 | 7 (Note: 6 (NL, 1991, 1995), 1 (MLB, 2004)) | |
| Frank Graves†‡ | NL | 1886, 1895 | 2 | |
| Bill Greenwood‡ | AA | 1884 | 1 | |
| Eric Gregg | NL | 1975–1999 | 2621 | |
| Bill Grieve | AL | 1938–1955 | 2789 | |
| Clark Griffith^{§}‡ | AA, NL, AL | 1891, 1894–1895, 1903 | 4 (Note: 1 (AA, 1891), 2 (NL, 1894–95), 1 (AL, 1903)) | |
| E. A. Griffith | AA | 1884 | 46 | |
| John Grim‡ | NL | 1892, 1895–1896 | 3 | |
| John Grimsley | NL | 1970 | 0 (Note: Umpire did not work any regular season games, but did appear in postseason or all-star games.) | |
| Scott Grinder | NL | 1983–1986 | 76 | |
| Bob Groom‡ | FL | 1914 | 1 | |
| Roger Grooms | NL | 1979 | 8 | |
| Emil Gross‡ | NL | 1881 | 1 | |
| Henry Gruber‡ | NL | 1889 | 2 | |
| George Grygiel | NL | 1970 | 0 | |
| Chris Guccione^ | MLB | 2000–present | 3219 | |
| Elmer Guckert | NL | 1976 | 1 | |
| Augie Guglielmo | NL | 1952 | 154 | |
| Ben Guiney‡ | NL | 1882–1883 | 2 | |
| Ad Gumbert‡ | PL, NL | 1890, 1892, 1895–1896 | 6 (Note: 3 (PL, 1890), 3 (NL, 1892, 1895–96)) | |
| Tom Gunning†‡ | NL, AA, PL | 1884–1885, 1887–1890 | 54 (Note: 6 (NL, 1884–85, 1887), 4 (AA, 1888–89), 44 (PL, 1890)) | |
| Joe Gunson‡ | AA, NL | 1889, 1892 | 3 (Note: 1 (AA, 1889), 2 (NL, 1892)) | |
| Dave Gustafson | AL | 1978 | 1 | |
| Bill Guthrie | NL, AL | 1913, 1922, 1928–1932 | 841 (Note: 20 (NL, 1913), 821 (AL, 1922, 1928–32)) | |

=== H ===
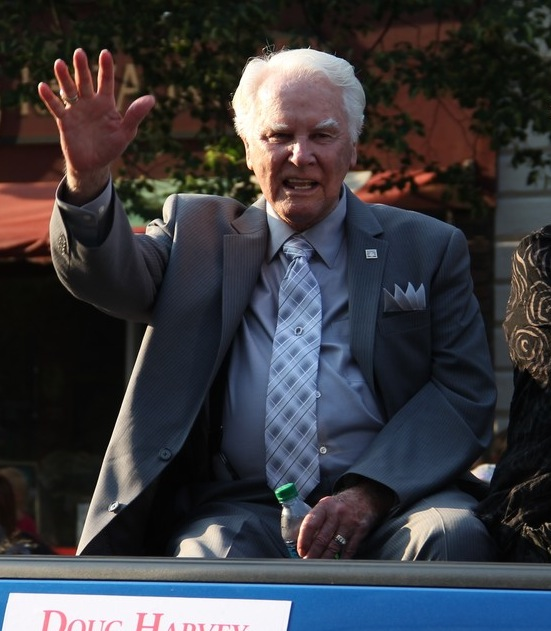
National Baseball Hall of Fame inductee Doug Harvey worked 4673 games in the NL

H
| Name | League(s) | Years | Games | Ref(s) |
|---|---|---|---|---|
| Mert Hackett‡ | NL | 1886 | 1 | |
| George Haddock‡ | NL, PL | 1889–1890 | 2 (Note: 1 (NL, 1889), 1 (PL, 1890)) | |
| Merrill Hadry | AL, NL | 1979 | 16 (Note: 11 (AL, 1979), 5 (NL, 1979)) | |
| Bill Hafner | AL | 1979 | 7 | |
| Al Halbach | NA | 1871–1875 | 7 | |
| Eddie Haley | NL | 1876 | 1 | |
| George Hall‡ | NA | 1873–1875 | 5 | |
| Jim Hall‡ | NA | 1872 | 2 | |
| Samuel Hall | NA | 1873 | 2 | |
| Bill Haller | AL | 1961–1982 | 3069 | |
| Tom Hallion | NL, MLB | 1985–1999, 2005–2022 | 3645 (Note: 1635 (NL, 1985–99), 2010 (MLB, 2005–19, 2021–22)) | |
| Bill Hallman‡ | PL, NL | 1890, 1903 | 5 (Note: 3 (PL, 1890), 2 (NL, 1903)) | |
| Adam Hamari^ | MLB | 2013–present | 1469 | |
| Ray Hamil | NL | 1979 | 3 | |
| Tom Hanahan^ | MLB | 2023–present | 321 | |
| Ned Hanlon^{§}‡ | NL | 1892 | 1 | |
| Doc Hanna | NA | 1872 | 1 | |
| Howard Hansen | NL | 1978–1979 | 15 | |
| Bob Hantak | NL | 1979 | 3 | |
| Lou Hardie | NL | 1887 | 1 | |
| Joe Harris‡ | AL | 1906 | 1 | |
| Lanny Harris | NL | 1979–1985 | 851 | |
| Vance Harris | NL | 1995 | 6 | |
| Pete Harrison | NL | 1916–1920 | 645 | |
| Bill Hart†‡ | NL, AL | 1896–1897, 1901, 1914–1915, 1917 | 294 (Note: 266 (NL, 1896–97, 1914–15, 1917), 28 (AL, 1901)) | |
| Bob Hart | AL, NL | 1912–1913, 1920–1929 | 1709 (Note: 203 (AL, 1912–13), 1506 (NL, 1920–29)) | |
| Isaac Hartenstein | NA | 1875 | 1 | |
| Grover Hartley‡ | AL | 1935 | 1 | |
| Jack Hartley | NL | 1894 | 14 | |
| Doug Harvey* | NL | 1962–1992 | 4673 | |
| Randy Harvey | AL | 1991, 1995 | 6 | |
| Jack Haskell | AL | 1901 | 120 | |
| James Hassett | AL | 1903 | 93 | |
| Scott Hastings‡ | NA, NL | 1871–1874, 1877 | 13 (Note: 10 (NA, 1871–74), 3 (NL, 1877)) | |
| Gil Hatfield‡ | NL | 1889 | 1 | |
| John Hatfield‡ | NA, NL | 1872–1873, 1876 | 8 (Note: 6 (NA, 1872–73), 2 (NL, 1876)) | |
| Charlie Hautz | NL, AA | 1876, 1879, 1882 | 29 (Note: 18 (NL, 1876, 1879), 11 (AA, 1882)) | |
| Bill Hawes | NL | 1880–1882 | 18 | |
| Hicks Hayhurst | NA | 1875 | 1 | |
| J. H. Haynie | NA | 1871 | 3 | |
| Egyptian Healy‡ | NL, AA | 1887, 1890 | 2 (Note: 1 (NL, 1887), 1 (AA, 1890)) | |
| Marvin Hecht | AL | 1979 | 1 | |
| Guy Hecker‡ | AA | 1888–1889 | 17 | |
| Doctor Hegeman | NA, NL | 1871, 1881 | 3 (Note: 1 (NA, 1871), 2 (NL, 1881)) | |
| Dick Heitzer | AL | 1979 | 12 | |
| Hugo Helburn | AA | 1887 | 1 | |
| J. Helm | NA | 1871–1872 | 4 | |
| George Hemming‡ | NL | 1895–1896 | 2 | |
| Hardie Henderson† | AA, NL | 1889, 1895–1896 | 63 (Note: 1 (AA, 1889), 62 (NL, 1895–96)) | |
| Ted Hendry | AL | 1977–1999 | 2905 | |
| Ed Hengel† | NL, AA | 1887, 1889 | 31 (Note: 11 (AA, 1887), 20 (AA, 1889)) | |
| Moxie Hengel‡ | UA | 1884 | 22 | |
| Butch Henline† | NL | 1945–1948 | 607 | |
| Jeff Henrichs | AL | 1993, 1995 | 10 | |
| Bill Henry | AL, NL | 1979 | 11 (Note: 9 (AL, 1979), 2 (NL, 1979)) | |
| Ángel Hernández | NL, MLB | 1991–2024 | 3839 (Note: 928 (NL, 1991–99), 2911 (MLB, 2000–24)) | |
| Bob Hernandez | NL | 1995 | 5 | |
| Fred Herndon | AL | 1993 | 1 | |
| Joseph Herr‡ | AA | 1888 | 3 | |
| W. E. Herrin | NL | 1894 | 1 | |
| George Heubel‡ | NA, NL | 1873, 1875–1876 | 31 (Note: 21 (NA, 1873, 1875), 10 (NL, 1876)) | |
| John Heydler | NL | 1895–1898 | 83 | |
| James Hickey | NL | 1882 | 1 | |
| Charlie Hickman‡ | AL | 1907 | 1 | |
| Ed Hickox | AL, MLB | 1990–1999, 2005–2022 | 2707 (Note: 905 (AL, 1990–99), 1802 (MLB, 2005–22)) | |
| Nat Hicks† | AA | 1885 | 4 | |
| Bill Higgins‡ | AA | 1890 | 1 | |
| John Higgins | AL | 1991, 1995 | 7 | |
| Scott Higgins | MLB | 2000–2003 | 174 | |
| Dick Higham†‡ | NA, NL | 1872–1875, 1881–1882 | 93 (Note: 6 (NA, 1872–75), 87 (NL, 1881–82)) | |
| George Hildebrand† | AL | 1913–1934 | 3331 | |
| Mike Hines‡ | NL | 1884 | 1 | |
| John Hirschbeck | AL, MLB | 1983–2016 | 3589 (Note: 2018 (AL, 1983–99), 1571 (MLB, 2000–07, 2009–11, 2013–16)) | |
| Mark Hirschbeck | NL, MLB | 1987–2003 | 1766 (Note: 1364 (NL, 1987–99), 402 (MLB, 2000–03)) | |
| Willard Hoagland | NL | 1894 | 27 | |
| Pat Hoberg | MLB | 2014–2023 | 1094 | |
| Charlie Hodes‡ | NA | 1874 | 4 | |
| Amory Hodges | NA, NL | 1874–1877 | 27 (Note: 14 (NA, 1874–75), 13 (NL, 1876–77)) | |
| Morris Hodges | NL, MLB | 1999–2001 | 45 (Note: 7 (NL, 1999), 38 (MLB, 2000–01)) | |
| Bill Hoffer‡ | NL | 1896 | 1 | |
| Mortimer Hogan† | NL | 1897 | 2 | |
| George Hogreiver | NL | 1893 | 3 | |
| Bill Hohn | NL, MLB | 1987–1999, 2002–2010 | 2195 (Note: 1309 (NL, 1987–99), 885 (MLB, 2002–10)) | |
| Bill Holbert†‡ | AA, PL | 1888, 1890 | 135 (Note: 3 (AA, 1888), 132 (PL, 1890)) | |
| Sam Holbrook | AL, NL, MLB | 1996–1999, 2002–2021 | 2423 (Note: 4 (AL, 1996), 264 (NL, 1997–99), 2155 (MLB, 2002–19, 2021)) | |
| Jack Holland | AA, UA, NL | 1884, 1887, 1889 | 151 (Note: 110 (AA, 1884, 1889), 32 (UA, 1884), 9 (NL, 1887)) | |
| Sam Holley | NA | 1871 | 12 | |
| Bug Holliday†‡ | AA, NL | 1888, 1897, 1903 | 55 (Note: 1 (AA, 1888), 54 (NL, 1897, 1903)) | |
| Matt Hollowell | MLB | 2000–2004 | 517 | |
| Ducky Holmes† | NL, AL | 1921, 1923–1924 | 307 (Note: 13 (NL, 1921), 294 (AL, 1923–24)) | |
| Mike Holoka | NL | 1991, 1995 | 7 | |
| Bob Homolka | NL | 1995 | 7 | |
| Jim Honochick | AL | 1949–1973 | 3815 | |
| Mike Hooper†‡ | NA, UA | 1872–1874, 1884 | 18 (Note: 9 (NA, 1872–74), 9 (UA, 1884)) | |
| Joe Hornung† | NL | 1892–1893, 1896 | 52 | |
| S. A. Hosworth | NA | 1872, 1874 | 2 | |
| Pliny Hough | NA | 1875 | 1 | |
| C. F. Howard | NL | 1884 | 1 | |
| Charles Howard | NA | 1872 | 1 | |
| Shorty Howe‡ | NL | 1890 | 1 | |
| Harry Howell†‡ | AL, FL | 1904, 1906–1907, 1915 | 90 (Note: 5 (AL, 1904, 1906–07), 85 (FL, 1915)) | |
| Dan Howley† | AL | 1922 | 1 | |
| James Hoye^ | MLB | 2003–present | 2566 | |
| Cal Hubbard* | AL | 1936–1951 | 2466 | |
| Mike Huber | AL | 1995 | 6 | |
| Marvin Hudson^ | NL, MLB | 1998–present | 3272 (Note: 57 (NL, 1998–99), 3215 (MLB, 2000–present)) | |
| Vincent Hudson | UA | 1884 | 1 | |
| Rich Humphrey | AL, NL | 1983, 1985–1986, 1995 | 36 (Note: 30 (AL, 1983, 1985–86), 6 (AL, 1995)) | |
| John Hunt | NL | 1895, 1898–1899 | 226 | |
| Eddie Hurley | AL | 1947–1965 | 2825 | |
| Michael Hurley | AA | 1887 | 9 | |
| George Hurll | NL | 1876 | 1 | |
| Tim Hurst | NL, AL | 1891–1900, 1903–1909 | 1546 (Note: 950 (NL, 1891–1900, 1903), 596 (AL, 1904–09)) | |
| Ron Hutson | NL | 1979 | 16 | |
| Ham Hyatt‡ | NL | 1912 | 2 | |

=== I ===
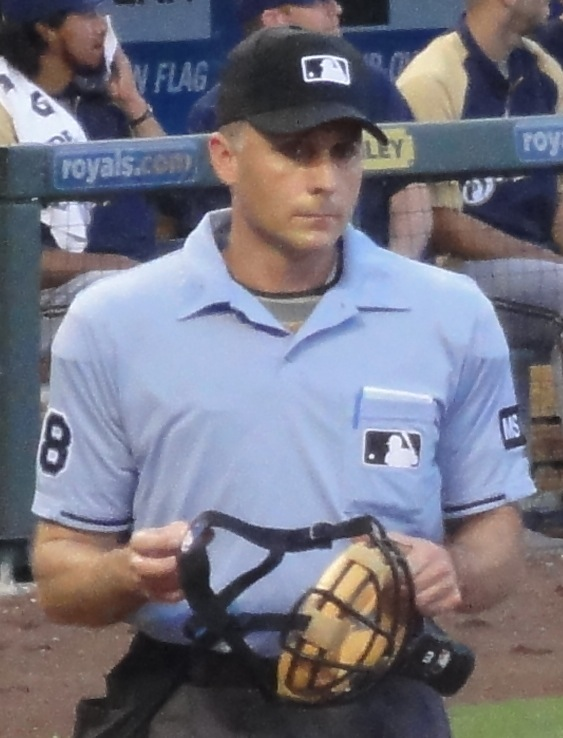
Dan Iassogna has worked 3108 games between the AL, NL, and MLB as of the end of the 2024 season

I
| Name | League(s) | Years | Games | Ref(s) |
|---|---|---|---|---|
| Dan Iassogna^ | AL, NL, MLB | 1999–present | 3221 (Note: 17 (AL, 1999), 6 (NL, 1999), 3198 (MLB, 2000–present)) | |
| Irwin | AA | 1882 | 1 | |
| Arthur Irwin†‡ | NL | 1881, 1902 | 53 | |
| John Irwin‡ | AA | 1885 | 1 | |
| Bill Ivory | AL | 1979 | 5 | |

=== J ===
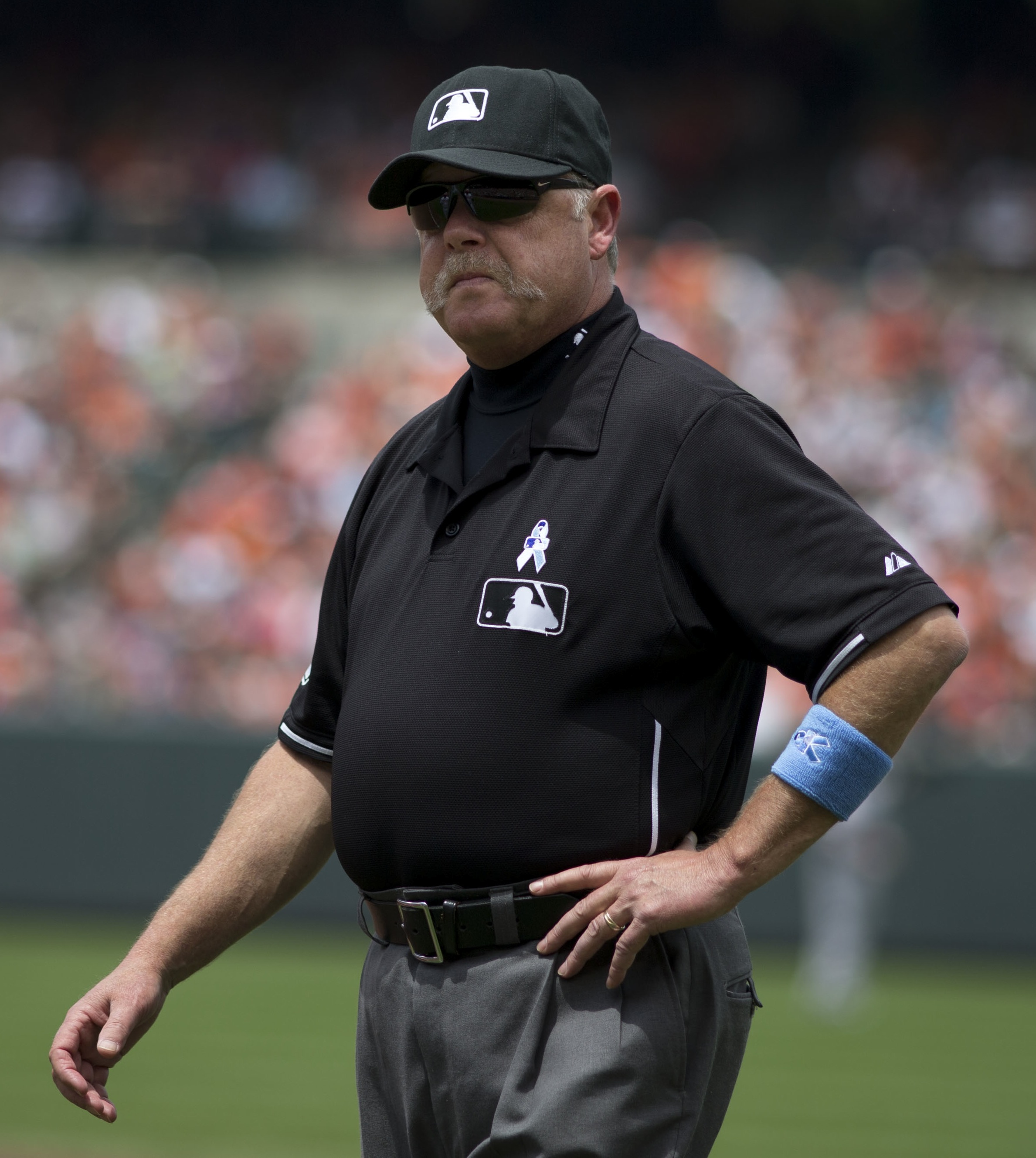
Jim Joyce worked 3268 games between the AL, and MLB

J
| Name | League(s) | Years | Games | Ref(s) |
|---|---|---|---|---|
| Fred Jacklitsch‡ | NL | 1901 | 1 | |
| Bill Jackowski | NL | 1952–1968 | 2519 | |
| Charles Jackson | AL | 1979 | 1 | |
| Dick Jackson | NL | 1995 | 7 | |
| Johnny James | AL | 1978–1979 | 19 | |
| Dan January | NL | 1991, 1995 | 7 | |
| Steven Jaschinski^ | MLB | 2025–present | 20 | |
| James Jean^ | MLB | 2024–present | 124 | |
| Ron Jeffers | NL | 1979 | 4 | |
| W. W. Jeffers | NL | 1881 | 24 | |
| Jeff Jenkins | NL | 1995 | 6 | |
| Alamazoo Jennings† | AA, UA | 1882, 1884–1885, 1887, 1889, 1891 | 46 (Note: 19 (AA, 1882, 1884–85, 1887, 1889, 1891), 27 (UA, 1884)) | |
| Andrew Jennings | NA | 1873 | 1 | |
| Hughie Jennings^{§}‡ | NL | 1893, 1900 | 3 | |
| Fred Jevne | NL | 1892, 1894–1895 | 80 | |
| Edwin Jiménez^ | MLB | 2023–present | 288 | |
| Emil Jiménez^ | MLB | 2023–present | 370 | |
| Richard Johns | NA | 1873 | 1 | |
| Adrian Johnson^ | MLB | 2006–present | 2237 | |
| A. J. Johnson | MLB | 2014–2015 | 6 | |
| Mark Johnson | AL | 1979–1999 | 1979 | |
| Steamboat Johnson | NL | 1914 | 66 | |
| Syl Johnson‡ | NL | 1934 | 1 | |
| Charles Johnston | AL | 1936–1937 | 270 | |
| Jim Johnstone | AL, NL, FL | 1902–1912, 1915 | 1736 (Note: 140 (AL, 1902), 1443 (NL, 1903–12), 153 (FL, 1915)) | |
| Austin Jones^ | MLB | 2024–present | 157 | |
| Bob Jones | AL, NL | 1979, 1984, 1995 | 14 (Note: 9 (AL, 1979), 5 (NL, 1995)) | |
| Charley Jones† | PL, AA | 1890–1891 | 197 (Note: 121 (PL, 1890), 76 (AA, 1891)) | |
| Henry Jones† | NL | 1890 | 1 | |
| Jim Jones | NL | 1979 | 13 | |
| Red Jones | AL | 1944–1949 | 886 | |
| Tyler Jones^ | MLB | 2025–present | 24 | |
| Lou Jorda | AL | 1927–1931, 1940–1952 | 2503 | |
| Bill Jordan | UA | 1884 | 6 | |
| Harold Jordan | AL | 1984 | 0 | |
| Victor Jose | NL | 1889 | 1 | |
| Mike Jost | MLB | 2004 | 18 | |
| C. E. Joyce | NL | 1879 | 1 | |
| Jim Joyce | AL, MLB | 1987–2016 | 3268 (Note: 1383 (AL, 1987–99), 1885 (MLB, 2000–16)) | |
| Joseph Julian | NL, AA | 1878, 1888 | 33 (Note: 31 (NL, 1878), 2 (AA, 1888)) | |
| Howard Jumper | NL | 1979 | 1 | |

=== K ===
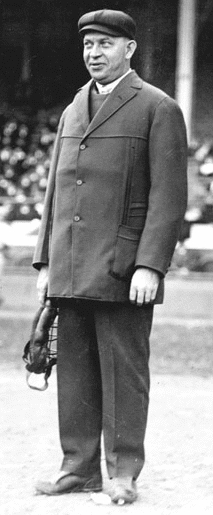
National Baseball Hall of Fame inductee Bill Klem worked 5372 NL games, the second most in major league history, and holds the record for most World Series appearances

K
| Name | League(s) | Years | Games | Ref(s) |
|---|---|---|---|---|
| S. L. Kahn | NA | 1875 | 1 | |
| Mike Kahoe‡ | NL | 1905 | 1 | |
| Ken Kaiser | AL | 1977–1999 | 2815 | |
| Steve Kane | NL, FL | 1909–1910, 1914 | 350 (Note: 312 (NL, 1909–10), 38 (FL, 1914)) | |
| Al Kaplan | AL | 1995 | 6 | |
| Ed Karger‡ | NL | 1906 | 1 | |
| Travis Katzenmeier | MLB | 1999–2001 | 205 | |
| Joe Kavulich | AL | 1978–1979 | 7 | |
| Tim Keefe^{§}†‡ | NL, AA, PL | 1880–1882, 1884–1885, 1887, 1890, 1892–1896 | 243 (Note: 240 (NL, 1880–82, 1885, 1887, 1892–96), 2 (AA, 1884), 1 (PL, 1890)) | |
| Willie Keeler^{§}‡ | NL | 1910 | 1 | |
| Jim Keenan†‡ | AA, NL | 1887–1888, 1890, 1893 | 9 (Note: 7 (AA, 1887–88), 2 (NL, 1890, 1893)) | |
| George Keerl‡ | NA | 1872, 1875 | 2 | |
| Wayne Keister | AL | 1978–1979 | 12 | |
| Dexter Kelley^ | MLB | 2025–present | 15 | |
| J. P. Kelley | NL | 1879 | 1 | |
| Kevin Kelley | MLB | 2001–2005 | 269 | |
| W. W. Kelley | NL | 1877 | 1 | |
| Jeff Kellogg | NL, MLB | 1991–2019 | 3276 (Note: 932 (NL, 1991–99), 2344 (MLB, 2000–19)) | |
| Win Kellum‡ | NL | 1905 | 1 | |
| Gene Kelly | AL | 1979 | 7 | |
| John Kelly‡ | UA | 1884 | 3 | |
| Kick Kelly† | NL, AA | 1882–1888, 1897 | 626 (Note: 184 (NL, 1882, 1884–85, 1888, 1897), 442 (AA, 1883–87)) | |
| King Kelly^{§}‡ | NL, PL | 1881, 1890, 1892–1893 | 7 (Note: 5 (NL, 1881, 1892–93), 2 (PL, 1890)) | |
| Toss Kelly | AL | 1905 | 67 | |
| Charles Kennedy | NL | 1904 | 19 | |
| Doc Kennedy† | NL, AL | 1884, 1910 | 3 (Note: 1 (NL, 1884), 2 (AL, 1910)) | |
| Ted Kennedy† | NL | 1893 | 1 | |
| John Kenney†‡ | NA, NL | 1872, 1876–1877 | 14 (Note: 1 (NA, 1872), 13 (NL, 1876–77)) | |
| John Kent | NA | 1875 | 2 | |
| John Kerin | AL | 1908–1910 | 265 | |
| John Kerins†‡ | NL, AA, AL | 1888–1891, 1903 | 246 (Note: 1 (NL, 1888), 243 (AA, 1889–91), 2 (AL, 1903)) | |
| John Kibler | NL | 1963–1989 | 3630 | |
| Frank Killen‡ | NL | 1896–1897 | 2 | |
| Matt Kilroy‡ | AA | 1887 | 1 | |
| Shawn Kimball | AL | 1991 | 1 | |
| Charles King | AL | 1904 | 162 | |
| Bill Kinnamon | AL | 1960–1969 | 1227 | |
| Tom Kinslow‡ | NL | 1892 | 2 | |
| Eden Kipp | NL | 1881 | 6 | |
| John Kirby‡ | AA | 1888 | 1 | |
| Ken Kirby | AL | 1979 | 7 | |
| Frank Kitson‡ | NL | 1902 | 1 | |
| Malachi Kittridge‡ | NL, AL | 1890, 1899, 1905–1906 | 4 (Note: 2 (NL, 1890, 1899), 2 (AL, 1905–06)) | |
| Chuck Klein^{§}‡ | NL | 1942 | 1 | |
| Gus Klein | AL | 1991, 1995 | 7 | |
| Barney Kleinbacher | AA | 1886 | 4 | |
| Bill Klem* | NL | 1905–1941 | 5372 | |
| Justin Klemm | MLB | 2000–2003 | 186 | |
| Bill Kling‡ | NL | 1892 | 1 | |
| Johnny Kling‡ | NL | 1901 | 1 | |
| Billy Klusman† | NL | 1893 | 1 | |
| Jim Knauss | AL | 1991 | 1 | |
| Phil Knell‡ | AA, NL | 1891, 1895 | 5 (Note: 4 (AA, 1891), 1 (NL, 1895)) | |
| Brian Knight | MLB | 2001–2024 | 2091 | |
| George Knight‡ | NA | 1875 | 3 | |
| Lon Knight†‡ | NL, AA, PL | 1876, 1887–1890 | 212 (Note: 46 (NL, 1876, 1888–89), 43 (AA, 1887), 123 (PL, 1890)) | |
| Jimmy Knowles‡ | NL | 1892 | 1 | |
| Henry Kohler‡ | NA | 1873 | 1 | |
| Lou Kolls | AL | 1933–1940 | 1195 | |
| Greg Kosc | AL | 1976–1999 | 3255 | |
| Bill Krieg‡ | NL | 1887 | 1 | |
| Ron Kulpa^ | NL, MLB | 1998–present | 2975 (Note: 84 (NL, 1998–99), 2891 (MLB, 2000–23)) | |
| Bill Kunkel† | AL | 1968–1984 | 2227 | |

=== L ===
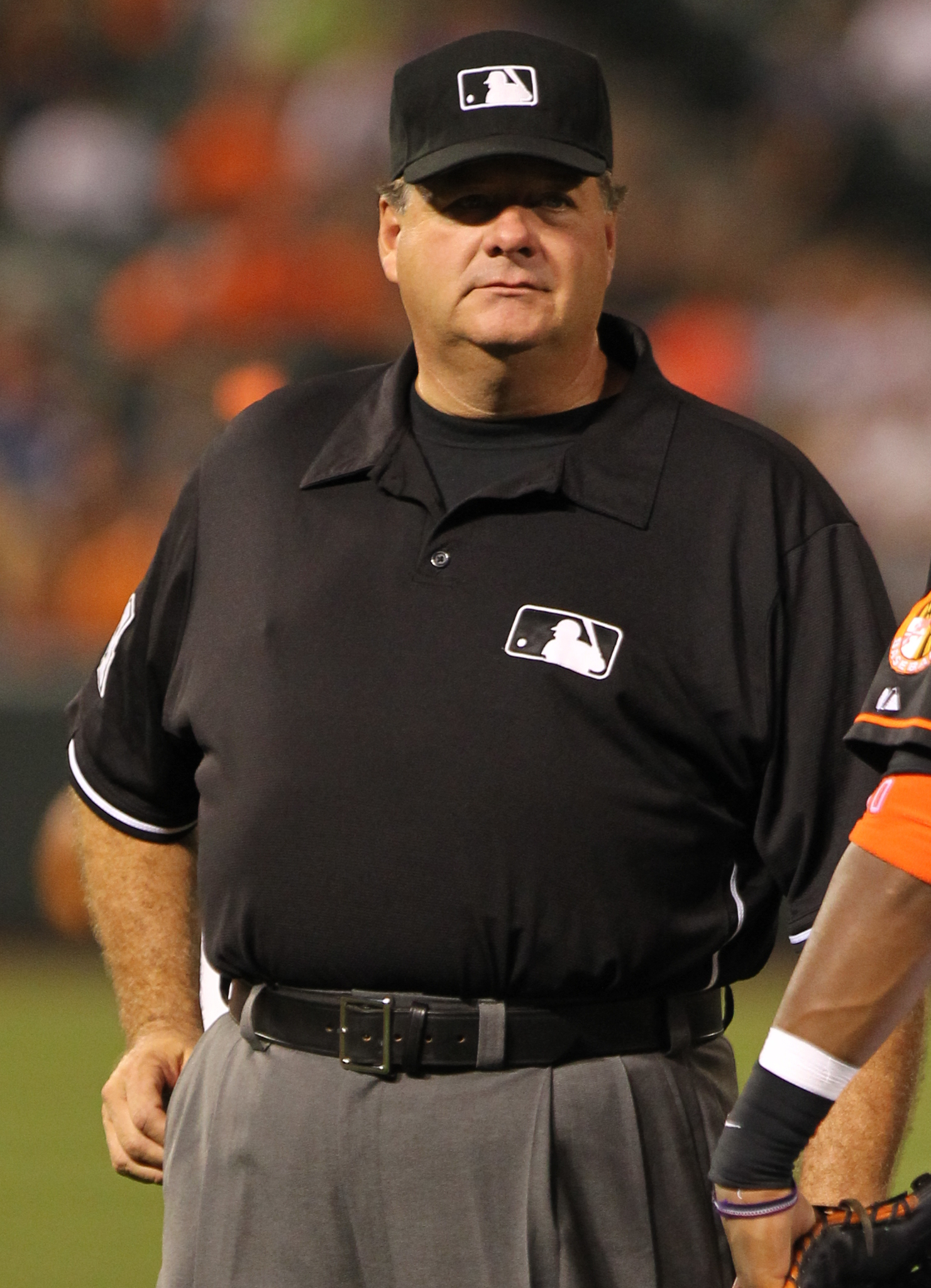
Jerry Layne worked 3639 games between the NL and MLB

L
| Name | League(s) | Years | Games | Ref(s) |
|---|---|---|---|---|
| Bud Lally | NL | 1896 | 46 | |
| Harry Lamb | NA | 1875 | 1 | |
| Jim Lambeth | NL | 1995 | 1 | |
| Ian Lamplugh | NL, MLB | 1999–2002 | 183 (Note: 28 (NL, 1999), 155 (MLB, 2000–02)) | |
| Stan Landes | NL | 1955–1972 | 2875 | |
| Frank Lane | NL | 1883 | 86 | |
| Joseph Langden | FL | 1915 | 3 | |
| Charles Lanigan | NL | 1908 | 4 | |
| Richard LaPierre | AL | 1979 | 3 | |
| Arlie Latham†‡ | NL | 1899–1900, 1902 | 130 | |
| Jumbo Latham‡ | AA | 1884 | 1 | |
| Bill Laude | AL | 1978–1979 | 3 | |
| Ben Laughlin†‡ | NA, NL | 1873, 1876 | 2 (Note: 1 (NA, 1873), 1 (NL, 1876)) | |
| William Laughlin | AA | 1882, 1885 | 3 | |
| Jacques Lauzon | NL | 1979 | 5 | |
| John Lawler | AA | 1884 | 7 | |
| Mike Lawlor | NL | 1882 | 1 | |
| Bill Lawson | NL | 1979 | 27 | |
| Jerry Layne | NL, MLB | 1989–2023 | 3639 (Note: 1341 (NL, 1989–99), 2298 (MLB, 2000–19, 2021–23)) | |
| Richie Lazar | AL | 1978–1979 | 2 | |
| Harry Leach | PL | 1890 | 28 | |
| Tom Leahy‡ | AL | 1901 | 1 | |
| LeClerc | NL | 1981 | 2 | |
| Tom Lee‡ | UA | 1884 | 3 | |
| Sam Leever‡ | NL | 1900 | 1 | |
| Bill Lennon‡ | NA | 1871–1874 | 15 | |
| Nic Lentz^ | MLB | 2016–present | 1122 | |
| Andy Leonard‡ | NA | 1872–1873, 1875 | 4 | |
| J. Leonard | NA | 1872 | 1 | |
| Tom Lepperd | AL | 1984–1986 | 78 | |
| Don Leppert†‡ | AL | 1978 | 1 | |
| Isaac Leroy | NA | 1871 | 3 | |
| Jay Levet | AL | 1979 | 16 | |
| Charlie Levis | AA | 1882 | 2 | |
| Steve Libby‡ | NL | 1879–1880 | 9 | |
| John Libka^ | MLB | 2017–present | 853 | |
| Fred Lincoln | NL | 1914 | 31 | |
| Vive Lindaman‡ | NL | 1907 | 1 | |
| Joe Linsalata | AL | 1961 | 166 | |
| Harry Little† | AA | 1884 | 1 | |
| Will Little^ | MLB | 2013–present | 1331 | |
| Shane Livensparger^ | MLB | 2017–present | 652 | |
| William Locke | NA | 1873–1874 | 2 | |
| Jerry Loeber | AL, NL | 1979 | 8 (Note: 3 (AL, 1979), 5 (NL, 1979)) | |
| Mark Lollo | MLB | 2011–2012 | 10 | |
| Billy Long | NL | 1893, 1895 | 32 | |
| Bob Long | NL | 1992–1993 | 12 | |
| Herman Long‡ | NL | 1897 | 1 | |
| Phil Lospitalier | AL, NL | 1979 | 17 (Note: 10 (AL, 1979), 7 (NL, 1979)) | |
| Jim Lovett | NA | 1871 | 1 | |
| Bobby Lowe‡ | AL | 1905–1906 | 2 | |
| John Lowell | NA | 1872–1873 | 3 | |
| Ron Luciano | AL | 1969–1979 | 1668 | |
| Terry Luhr | NL | 1984 | 2 | |
| Dale Luker | AL | 1995 | 6 | |
| Carl Lundgren‡ | NL | 1905–1906 | 5 | |
| Charlie Lupo | NL, AL | 1978–1979 | 35 (Note: 17 (NL, 1978–79), 18 (AL, 1979)) | |
| Lush | NA | 1873 | 1 | |
| Jack Lynch‡ | AA | 1884 | 1 | |
| Thomas Lynch | NL | 1888–1899, 1902 | 1325 | |
| Toby Lyons | AA | 1891 | 1 | |
| John Lyston | AA | 1890 | 3 | |

=== M ===
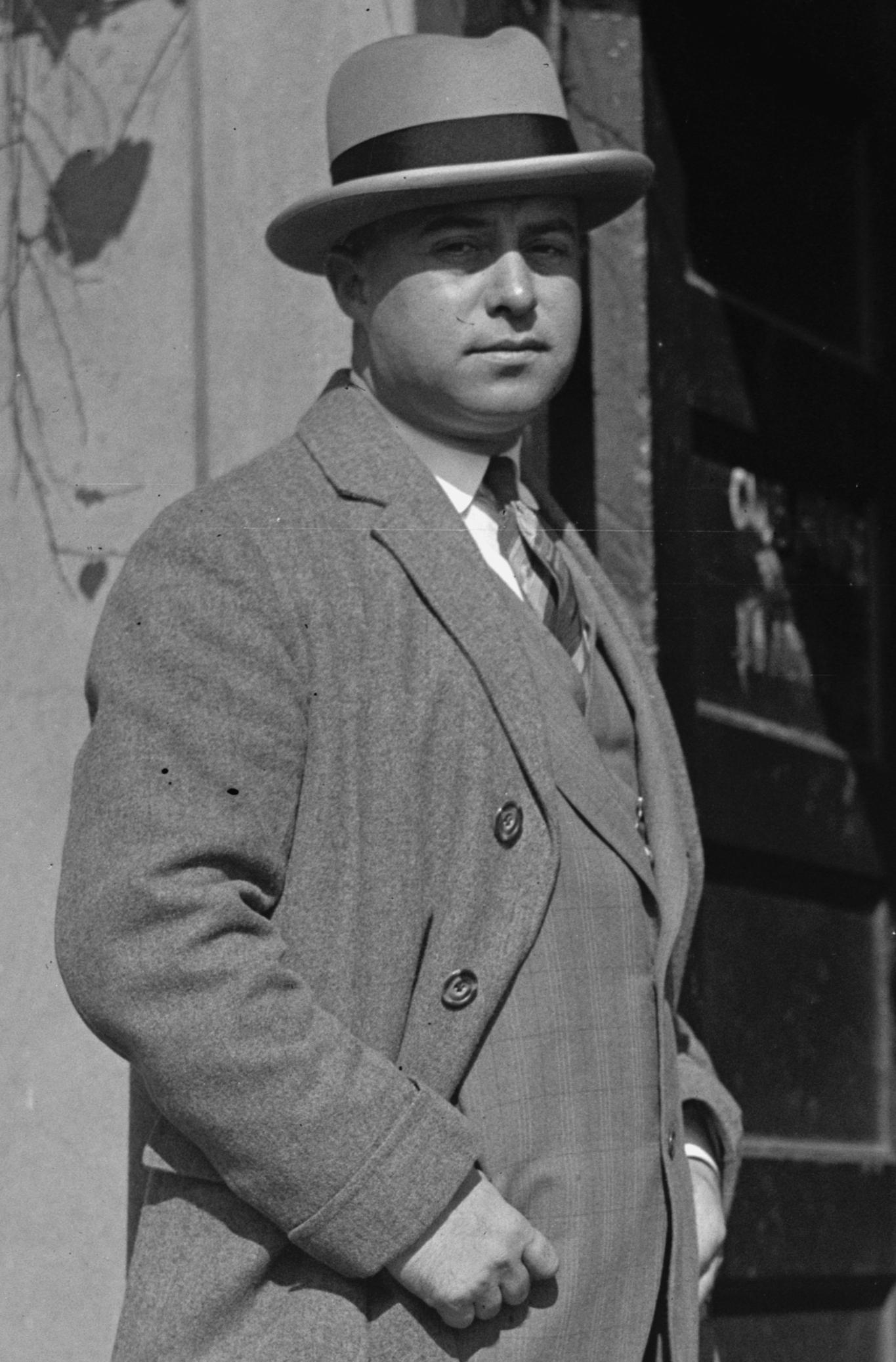
National Baseball Hall of Fame inductee Bill McGowan worked 4425 AL games and was the founder of the Harry Wendelstedt Umpire School

M
| Name | League(s) | Years | Games | Ref(s) |
|---|---|---|---|---|
| Fred Mabbott | AL | 1979 | 1 | |
| Harry Mace† | AL | 1903 | 1 | |
| Denny Mack†‡ | NA, AA | 1873–1875, 1886 | 34 (Note: 28 (NA, 1873–75), 6 (AA, 1886)) | |
| Alex MacKay^ | MLB | 2020–present | 379 | |
| John Mackin | AL | 1979 | 1 | |
| Jimmy Macullar†‡ | AA, NL | 1886, 1891–1892 | 39 (Note: 6 (AA, 1886, 1891), 33 (NL, 1892)) | |
| Kid Madden‡ | PL | 1890 | 1 | |
| Charles Maddox | NL | 1882 | 1 | |
| Sherry Magee† | NL | 1928 | 148 | |
| George Magerkurth | NL | 1929–1947 | 2812 | |
| Jim Maginnis | NL | 1910 | 1 | |
| John Magner† | AA | 1882–1884, 1887 | 30 | |
| Maguire | NL | 1877 | 4 | |
| Joe Maher | NL | 1979, 1984 | 8 | |
| Jerry Mahoney | AA, NL | 1891–1892 | 65 (Note: 49 (AA, 1891), 16 (NL, 1892)) | |
| Nick Mahrley^ | MLB | 2017–present | 825 | |
| Fergy Malone†‡ | NA, NL | 1875, 1884, 1892 | 17 (Note: 2 (NA, 1875), 15 (NL, 1884, 1892)) | |
| J. R. Malone | AA | 1888 | 3 | |
| Martin Malone | NA | 1875 | 4 | |
| Billy Maloney‡ | NL | 1902 | 1 | |
| George Maloney | AL | 1969–1983 | 2159 | |
| Terry Mann | AL | 1995 | 6 | |
| Al Mannassau | NL, AL, FL | 1899, 1901, 1914 | 297 (Note: 92 (NL, 1899), 96 (AL, 1901), 109 (FL, 1914)) | |
| Jack Manning‡ | NL | 1881 | 1 | |
| Jim Manning†‡ | NL | 1886, 1893 | 3 | |
| J. H. Manny | NA | 1871 | 1 | |
| Blake Mapledoram | UA, NL | 1884, 1886 | 41 (Note: 40 (UA, 1884), 1 (NL, 1886)) | |
| Firpo Marberry† | AL | 1935 | 96 | |
| Jimmy Marino | AL | 1979 | 3 | |
| Alfonso Márquez^ | NL, MLB | 1999–present | 3117 (Note: 30 (NL, 1999), 3087 (MLB, 2000–present)) | |
| Randy Marsh | NL, MLB | 1981–2009 | 3707 (Note: 2521 (NL, 1981–99), 1186 (MLB, 2000–09)) | |
| Frank Marshall | AA | 1887 | 2 | |
| Lewis Martin | NA | 1871, 1873–1874 | 7 | |
| Phonney Martin†‡ | NA, NL | 1871, 1873, 1875–1876 | 10 (Note: 9 (NA, 1871, 1873, 1875), 1 (NL, 1876)) | |
| Bruce Martine | NL | 1991 | 1 | |
| Charlie Mason | NL | 1876 | 1 | |
| Darrel Mason | AL | 1995 | 7 | |
| Bobby Mathews†‡ | NA, NL, AA, PL | 1871, 1873–1876, 1880, 1882, 1888, 1890–1891 | 155 (Note: 25 (NA, 1871, 1873–75), 17 (NL, 1876, 1880, 1882), 41 (AA, 1888, 1891), 72 (PL, 1890)) | |
| Christy Mathewson^{§}‡ | NL | 1901, 1907 | 3 | |
| Mike Mattimore‡ | AA | 1888 | 1 | |
| Boyd Mauer | NL, AL | 1978–1979 | 35 (Note: 17 (NL, 1978–79), 18 (AL, 1979)) | |
| Bert Maxwell‡ | FL | 1914 | 1 | |
| Corty Maxwell | NA | 1875 | 3 | |
| Ben May^ | MLB | 2014–present | 1114 | |
| Ed Mayer† | NL | 1893 | 1 | |
| Al Mays‡ | AA | 1887 | 2 | |
| Thomas Mays | | 1871 | 1 | |
| Jimmy McAleer‡ | NL | 1893 | 1 | |
| Sport McAllister‡ | NL, AL | 1899, 1901–1902 | 3 (Note: 1 (NL, 1899), 2 (AL, 1901–02)) | |
| John McArdle | MLB | 2004 | 1 | |
| Gary McAvoy | AL | 1979 | 4 | |
| Charles McCafferty | NL | 1921, 1923 | 8 | |
| Harry McCaffery† | UA, NL | 1884–1886 | 13 (Note: 7 (UA, 1884), 6 (NL, 1885–86)) | |
| Jack McCarthy | AL | 1905 | 148 | |
| John McCarthy‡ | AA | 1889 | 1 | |
| Tommy McCarthy^{§}‡ | AA, NL | 1889, 1896 | 2 (Note: 1 (AA, 1889), 1 (NL, 1896)) | |
| Joseph McCartney | AA | 1882 | 1 | |
| Al McCauley‡ | NL | 1890 | 1 | |
| Pat McCauley‡ | NL | 1896 | 1 | |
| Tim McClelland | AL, MLB | 1981–2013 | 4236 (Note: 2417 (AL, 1981–99), 1819 (MLB, 2000–13)) | |
| Barry McCormick† | FL, AL, NL | 1914–1915, 1917, 1919–1929 | 1982 (Note: 315 (FL, 1914–15), 97 (AL, 1917), 1571 (NL, 1919–29)) | |
| Jerry McCormick† | AA | 1888 | 1 | |
| Jim McCormick‡ | NL | 1885 | 1 | |
| Larry McCoy | AL | 1970–1999 | 4023 | |
| Kyle McCrady | MLB | 2020–2021 | 31 | |
| McCrea | NA | 1872 | 1 | |
| Fred McCrum | NL | 1892 | 7 | |
| Sandy McDermott† | NL | 1890, 1897 | 126 | |
| Thomas McDiarmed | NA | 1872 | 1 | |
| James McDonald | NA | 1872 | 1 | |
| Jim McDonald† | NL | 1895, 1897–1899 | 572 | |
| Scott McDougall | AL | 1991 | 1 | |
| Harvey McElwee | NL | 1877 | 6 | |
| Horace McFarlan | NL | 1896–1897 | 30 | |
| Ed McFarland‡ | NL | 1896 | 2 | |
| Chippy McGarr†‡ | NL | 1895, 1899 | 112 | |
| Mike McGeary‡ | NA | 1872, 1875 | 2 | |
| Pat McGee† | NL, AA | 1876, 1882, 1884 | 6 (Note: 1 (NL, 1876), 5 (AA, 1882, 1884)) | |
| Jumbo McGinnis† | AA | 1888–1889 | 3 | |
| Joe McGinnity^{§}‡ | NL | 1900 | 1 | |
| Tom McGinty | NL | 1897 | 4 | |
| Bill McGowan* | AL | 1925–1954 | 4425 | |
| Eugene McGreevy | AL | 1912–1913 | 98 | |
| Ted McGrew | NL | 1930–1931, 1933–1934 | 440 | |
| Deacon McGuire‡ | NL, AL | 1886–1887, 1894, 1896–1897, 1901, 1905 | 12 (Note: 11 (NL, 1886–87, 1884, 1896–97, 1901), 1 (AL, 1905)) | |
| Bill McGunnigle† | UA | 1884 | 1 | |
| Eddie McGunnigle | NL | 1888 | 1 | |
| Jim McKean | AL, MLB | 1974–2001 | 3514 (Note: 3355 (AL, 1974–99), 159 (MLB, 2000–01)) | |
| Russ McKelvy‡ | AA | 1882 | 1 | |
| Bill McKinley | AL | 1946–1965 | 2976 | |
| Alex McKinnon‡ | NL | 1886 | 1 | |
| Edward McLaughlin | NL | 1929 | 155 | |
| Mike McLaughlin | NL | 1893 | 42 | |
| Peter McLaughlin | NL | 1924–1927 | 447 | |
| Thomas McLaughlin | AA | 1891 | 19 | |
| William McLaughlin‡ (shortstop) | UA | 1884 | 1 | |
| William McLaughlin (umpire) | AA | 1882 | 1 | |
| Billy McLean | NA, NL, AA | 1872–1876, 1878–1880, 1882–1885, 1889–1890 | 435 (Note: 90 (NA, 1872–75), 312 (NL, 1876, 1878–80, 1882–84), 33 (AA, 1882, 1885, 1889–90)) | |
| Harry McLean | NA | 1871, 1873 | 3 | |
| Billy McMahon | NA | 1871 | 1 | |
| Sadie McMahon‡ | AA, NL | 1890, 1893 | 2 (Note: 1 (AA, 1890), 1 (NL, 1893)) | |
| Dennis McMinimum | UA | 1884 | 2 | |
| John McMullin†‡ | NA, NL | 1874, 1876 | 4 (Note: 1 (NA, 1874), 3 (NL, 1876)) | |
| Jim McNally | AL | 1979 | 15 | |
| Bob McNichol | AA | 1883 | 45 | |
| Jack McQuaid | AA, NL | 1886–1894 | 952 (Note: 242 (AA, 1886–88), 710 (NL, 1889–94)) | |
| Mart McQuaid† | NL | 1893 | 2 | |
| John McSherry | NL | 1971–1995 | 3396 | |
| Trick McSorley†‡ | AA | 1884, 1888 | 2 | |
| Cal McVey‡ | NA | 1871, 1873, 1875 | 3 | |
| Lewis Meacham | NA | 1875 | 1 | |
| James Meagher | NL | 1877 | 2 | |
| Jerry Meals | NL, MLB | 1992–2022 | 3303 (Note: 397 (NL, 1992–99), 2906 (MLB, 2000–22)) | |
| Charles Mears | NL | 1894 | 1 | |
| William Medart | NL, AA | 1876–1877, 1887 | 8 (Note: 6 (NL, 1876–77), 2 (AA, 1887)) | |
| Jouett Meekin‡ | NL | 1895–1896 | 4 | |
| Cliff Megrue | NL | 1876 | 1 | |
| Dave Melton† | NL | 1978 | 1 | |
| Jock Menefee‡ | NL | 1903 | 1 | |
| Win Mercer‡ | NL | 1896 | 1 | |
| Chuck Meriwether | AL, MLB | 1987–2009 | 2594 (Note: 1246 (AL, 1987–99), 1348 (MLB, 2000–19)) | |
| Durwood Merrill | AL | 1976–1999 | 3121 | |
| Ed Merrill‡ | AA | 1884 | 1 | |
| Clarence Merritt | AL | 1979 | 15 | |
| Sam Mertes‡ | NL | 1905 | 1 | |
| Dan Merzel^ | MLB | 2020–present | 601 | |
| Jacob Metz^ | MLB | 2023–present | 195 | |
| Joseph Mickel | AL | 1987 | 2 | |
| Bill Miller^ | AL, MLB | 1997–present | 3419 (Note: 177 (AL, 1997–99), 3242 (MLB, 2000–present)) | |
| Brennan Miller^ | MLB | 2019–present | 544 | |
| Bud Miller | NL | 1979 | 3 | |
| Charles Miller | AA | 1884 | 2 | |
| Cyclone Miller‡ | NL | 1884 | 1 | |
| Doggie Miller‡ | NL | 1893, 1896 | 6 | |
| Gale Miller | AL | 1979 | 12 | |
| George Miller† | NL | 1879 | 9 | |
| Joe Miller‡ | NA | 1872–1873 | 2 | |
| Otto Miller† | NL | 1934 | 1 | |
| Jocko Milligan‡ | PL | 1890 | 1 | |
| A. G. Mills | NL | 1877 | 1 | |
| Charlie Mills†‡ | NA | 1871–1873 | 26 | |
| Greg Mills | NL | 1979 | 6 | |
| Ed Mincher‡ | NA | 1872 | 3 | |
| William Mincher | NA | 1875 | 3 | |
| Mitchell | AA | 1887 | 3 | |
| Charlie Mitchell | NL | 1892 | 32 | |
| Franklin Mitchell | NA | 1874–1875 | 4 | |
| Pat Monahan | AL | 1931 | 1 | |
| Ed Montague | NL, MLB | 1974, 1976–2009 | 4369 (Note: 3240 (NL, 1974, 1976–99), 1129 (MLB, 2000–09)) | |
| Montgomery | UA | 1884 | 1 | |
| Earl Moore‡ | AL | 1903 | 2 | |
| Malachi Moore^ | MLB | 2020–present | 511 | |
| Gabe Morales^ | MLB | 2014–present | 1387 | |
| Augie Moran | NL | 1903–1904, 1910, 1918 | 368 | |
| Charley Moran† | NL | 1918–1939 | 3181 | |
| Pat Moran‡ | | 1901 | 1 | |
| Bill Morgan‡ | AA | 1884 | 3 | |
| Hank Morgenweck | AL | 1972–1975 | 623 | |
| George Moriarty† | AL | 1917–1926, 1929–1940 | 3047 | |
| John Morrill† | NL | 1891, 1896 | 12 | |
| Ed Morris† | NL | 1895, 1897 | 2 | |
| John Morris | NL | 1876 | 4 | |
| Dan Morrison | AL, MLB | 1979–2001 | 2660 (Note: 2491 (AL, 1979–99), 169 (MLB, 2000–01)) | |
| Charlie Morton†‡ | AA | 1884, 1886 | 9 | |
| Edwin Moscoso^ | MLB | 2020–present | 692 | |
| T. E. Moseley | NA | 1873, 1875 | 5 | |
| Casey Moser | MLB | 2005, 2008–2010 | 37 | |
| Bob Motley | NAL | 1947–1948 | (Note: Game totals for Negro league umpires do not currently exist.) | |
| Frank Mountain‡ | AA | 1884 | 2 | |
| Bob Moyer | AL | 1979 | 11 | |
| Joe Mrvos | NL | 1979 | 3 | |
| Mike Muchlinski^ | MLB | 2006–present | 1918 | |
| Thomas Muir | NL | 1876 | 1 | |
| Jim Mulcahy | AL | 1979 | 4 | |
| Tony Mullane†‡ | AA, NL | 1888, 1893, 1897 | 5 (Note: 3 (AA, 1888), 2 (NL, 1893, 1897)) | |
| Dominic Mullaney | AL | 1915 | 36 | |
| Peter Mullen | AA, NL | 1891, 1893 | 5 (Note: 1 (AA, 1891), 4 (NL, 1893)) | |
| John Mullin | NL, AL, FL | 1909, 1911, 1915 | 222 (Note: 7 (NL, 1909), 148 (AL, 1911), 67 (FL, 1915)) | |
| Joe Mulvey‡ | NL | 1895 | 1 | |
| Tim Murnane‡ | NA, NL | 1873–1875, 1886 | 7 (Note: 6 (NA, 1873–75), 1 (NL, 1886)) | |
| Henry Murphy | NL | 1880 | 6 | |
| J. A. Murphy | FL | 1914 | 2 | |
| Joe Murphy‡ | AA | 1887 | 4 | |
| Morgan Murphy‡ | NL | 1886, 1893, 1896, 1898 | 6 | |
| Yale Murphy‡ | NL | 1895, 1897 | 2 | |
| Ed Murray | AL | 1991 | 1 | |
| Miah Murray† | NL | 1894–1895, 1900, 1905, 1910 | 122 | |
| George Myers‡ | NL | 1886 | 1 | |
| Joe Myers | NL | 1979 | 13 | |

== See also ==
- List of Major League Baseball umpires (A–F)
- List of Major League Baseball umpires (N–Z)
- List of Major League Baseball umpiring leaders
