= Mark Ripperger =

American baseball umpire (born 1980)

MLB – No. 90
- Umpire
- Born: August 6, 1980 (age 46); Escondido, California, U.S.

MLB debut
- September 30, 2010

Crew information
- Umpiring crew: A
- Crew members: #2 Dan Bellino (crew chief); #90 Mark Ripperger; #43 Shane Livensparger; #3 Dan Merzel

Career highlights and awards
- Special assignments: World Series (2024); League Championship Series (2023, 2025, 2026); Division Series (2022, 2024); Wild Card Games/Series (2020, 2023, 2025, 2026); All-Star Game (2022); MLB Little League Classic (2018); World Baseball Classic Qualifiers (2012); Worked the plate for Mike Fiers of the Oakland A's no hitter against the Cincinnati Reds on May 7, 2019.; Called a perfect game on April 10, 2025.

Mark Anthony Ripperger (born August 6, 1980) is an American Major League Baseball (MLB) umpire. He made his Major League umpiring debut on September 30, 2010. After Ripperger served as a minor–league replacement umpire, he was promoted to full–time status prior to the 2015 season. His uniform number is 90. On April 10, 2025, in a game between the Minnesota Twins and Kansas City Royals, Ripperger became just the second umpire to record a 'perfect game' since Umpire Scorecards began tracking games, calling all 136 taken pitches correctly.

== See also ==
- List of Major League Baseball umpires (disambiguation)
