= D. J. Reyburn =

American baseball umpire (born 1976)

D.J. Reyburn
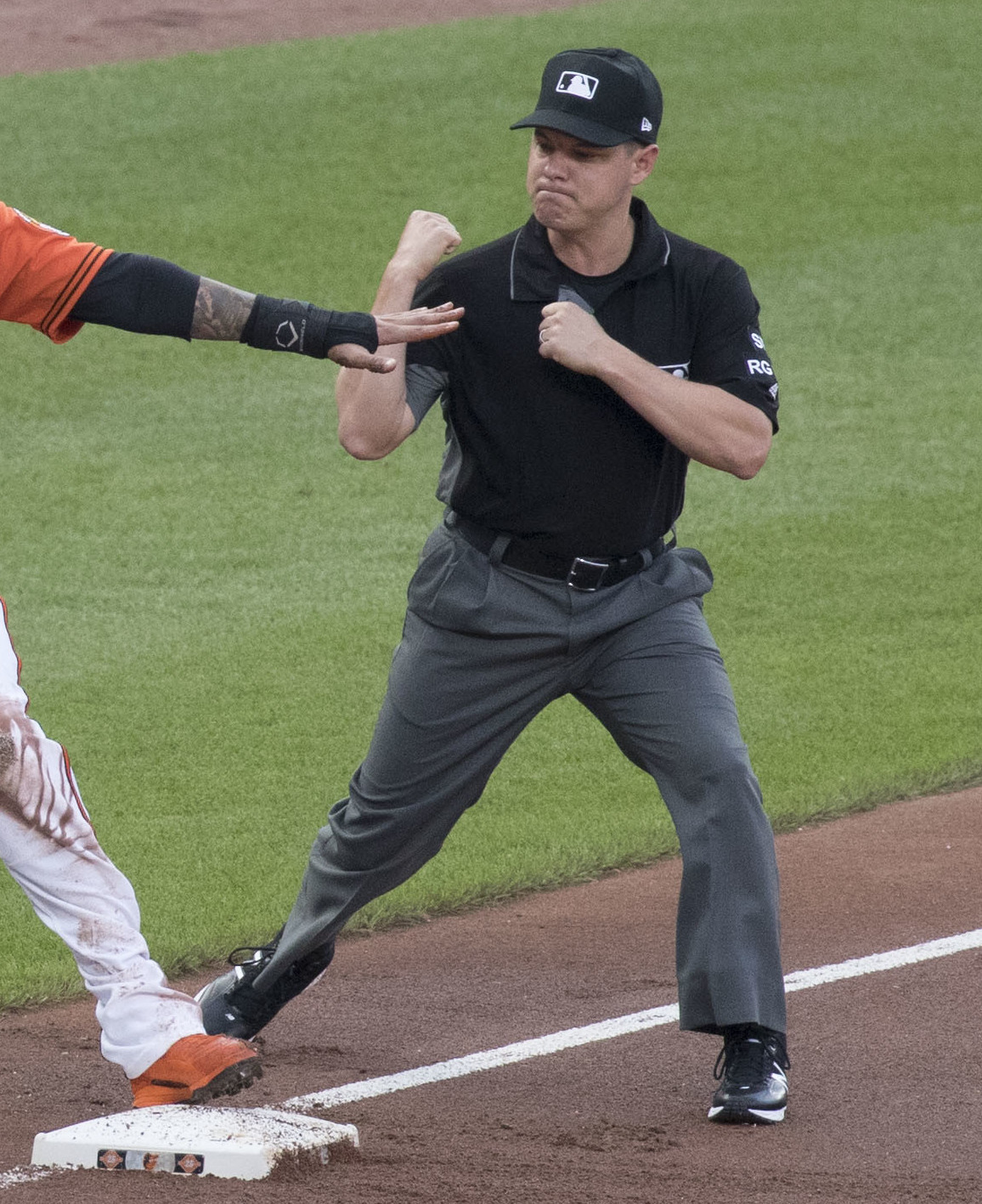
- Reyburn in 2017

MLB – No. 17
- Umpire
- Born: October 13, 1976 (age 49); Grand Rapids, Michigan, U.S.

MLB debut
- June 10, 2008

Crew information
- Umpiring crew: E
- Crew members: #92 James Hoye (crew chief); #17 D. J. Reyburn; #84 John Libka; #29 Sean Barber

Career highlights and awards
- Special Assignments: World Series (2023); League Championship Series (2022, 2025); Division Series (2018, 2019, 2021, 2023, 2026); Wild Card Games/Series (2020, 2022, ( 2025); All-Star Games (2019); World Baseball Classic (2017); World Baseball Classic Qualifiers (2012)

Daniel James Reyburn (born October 13, 1976) is an American Major League Baseball umpire. He wore uniform number 70 when he first came up to MLB, then changed to number 17 starting with the 2018 season, two years after the retirement of John Hirschbeck, who previously wore #17.

== Early life and education ==
Reyburn played center field for the Hope College Flying Dutchmen. On campus he was involved with the Emersonian Fraternity. He graduated in December 1999 with a bachelor's degree in Sociology. In January 2000, he enrolled at the umpire school in Florida and graduated after five weeks of training.

== Umpiring career ==
Reyburn has been an umpire in the Midwest League (2002), Florida State League (2003), Eastern League (2004–2005) and Pacific Coast League (2006–2009). He has served as an MLB call-up umpire in 2008 and 2009. He worked the Taiwan qualifier of the 2013 World Baseball Classic in November 2012.

Reyburn was umpiring in the Dominican League in 2009-2010 when he became the center of media attention on January 16. He ejected Licey Tigers catcher Ronny Paulino for arguing balls and strikes, then was attacked by Licey manager José Offerman. Offerman had to be removed by the police and was banned for three years from the Dominican League for the assault.

== See also ==
- List of Major League Baseball umpires (disambiguation)
