= Di Lollo =

Di Lollo is a surname. Notable people with the surname include:

- Justin Di Lollo, Australian lobbyist
- Lautaro Di Lollo (born 2004), Argentine professional footballer

== See also ==
- Lollo
