= Dan Merzel =

American baseball umpire (born 1987)

MLB – No. 3
- Umpire
- Born: July 20, 1987 (age 39); Hopkinton, Massachusetts, US

MLB debut
- August 29, 2020

Crew information
- Umpiring crew: A
- Crew members: #2 Dan Bellino (crew chief); #90 Mark Ripperger; #43 Shane Livensparger; #3 Dan Merzel

Career highlights and awards
- Special assignments: Division Series (2025); Wild Card Games/Series (2026); Triple-A National Championship Game (2019)

Daniel Benjamin Merzel (born July 20, 1987) is an American professional baseball umpire. He has been an umpire in Major League Baseball since 2020, and wears uniform number 3.

== Career ==
Merzel graduated from umpire school in 2010, and was assigned to the New York–Penn League in 2011. He then worked in the Arizona Instructional, South Atlantic, Carolina and Eastern leagues before making it to the Triple A International League. He earned assignment to the Arizona Fall League as well as the 2015 All-Star Futures Game, the 2018 Triple-A All-Star Game and was crew chief for the 2019 Triple-A National Championship Game.

Merzel made his major league debut on August 29, 2020 at the Great American Ball Park. He worked at third base for the first game of a doubleheader between the Chicago Cubs and the Cincinnati Reds alongside Will Little, Dan Bellino and crew chief Angel Hernandez. He was hired to MLB’s full time umpiring staff for the 2025 season after officiating 452 games as a minor league call up.

== Personal life ==
Merzel lives in North Carolina with his wife; they have one son. He grew up in Hopkinton, Massachusetts, and attended Hopkinton High School where he played and officiated baseball and ice hockey.

He graduated with an applied mathematics & statistics degree from Johns Hopkins University, where he also played college baseball. He was a second baseman and played in the 2008 NCAA Division III World Series.

== See also ==
- List of Major League Baseball umpires (G–M)
