= Ryuya Ogawa =

Japanese baseball player (born 1991)

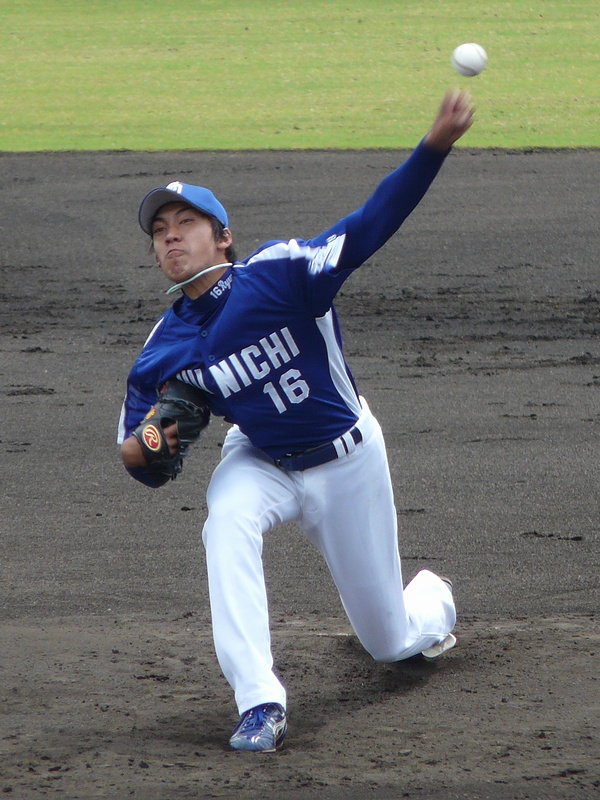
- Ogawa with the Chunichi Dragons

Free agent
- Pitcher
- Born: September 3, 1991 (age 34); Chiba, Chiba, Japan
- Bats: Left Throws: Left

NPB debut
- October 20, 2011, for the Chunichi Dragons

NPB statistics (through 2020 season)
- Win–loss record: 8–5
- Earned run average: 2.69
- Strikeouts: 102
- Stats at Baseball Reference

Teams
- Chunichi Dragons (2011–2017); Saitama Seibu Lions (2018–2021)

Ryuya Ogawa (小川 龍也, Ogawa Ryūya; born September 3, 1991 in Chiba, Chiba) is a Japanese professional baseball pitcher who is a free agent. He has previously played in Nippon Professional Baseball (NPB) for the Chunichi Dragons and Saitama Seibu Lions.

== Career ==
=== Chunichi Dragons ===
Ogawa debuted for the Chunichi Dragons on October 20, 2011. Through early 2018, he split time between the main Dragons club, and their minor league team in the Western League. In NPB, Ogawa had a 1–3 record with 53 strikeouts.

=== Saitama Seibu Lions ===
On July 23, 2018, Ogawa was traded to the Saitama Seibu Lions. Through 2021, he posted a 7–2 record with a 3.82 ERA and 49 strikeouts.

He became a free agent following the 2021 season.

=== Sultanes de Monterrey ===
On January 25, 2022, Ogawa signed with the Sultanes de Monterrey of the Mexican League. He only made one start, tossing three innings and giving up three earned runs. Ogawa was released by the Sultanes on April 26.

== Personal life ==
Ogawa was born to a Filipino mother and Japanese father.
