= Yu-Ching Lin =

Taiwanese baseball player

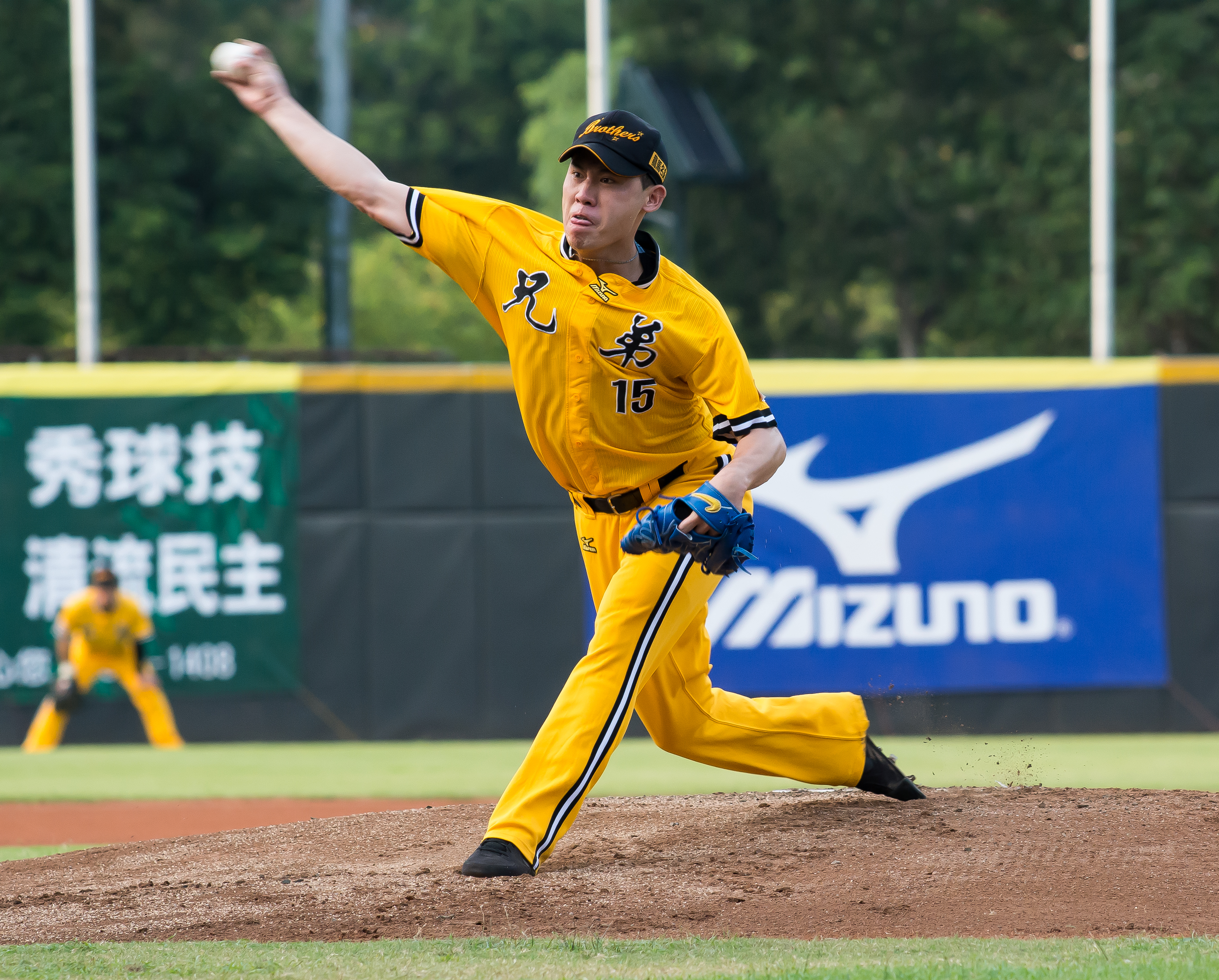
- Lin with the Brother Elephants
- Pitcher
- Born: December 29, 1988 (age 37); Chiayi City, Taiwan
- Bats: Left Throws: Right
- Stats at Baseball Reference

Teams
- Brother Elephants/Chinatrust Elephants (2012–2017); Fubon Guardians (2018–2019); Uni-President 7-Eleven Lions (2020)

Yu-Ching Lin (Chinese: 林煜清) (born December 29, 1988) is a former Taiwanese baseball player who had played for the Brother Elephants, Chinatrust Brothers, Fubon Guardians and Uni-President 7-Eleven Lions in the Chinese Professional Baseball League.

He attended National Taiwan University of Physical Education and Sport and represented Taiwan at the 2009 World Port Tournament, 2009 Asian Baseball Championship, 2009 Baseball World Cup, 2011 Baseball World Cup and 2013 World Baseball Classic.

In January 2021, he made statement of retirement, ending 9-year player career.
