= Mark Lollo =

American baseball umpire (born 1982)

- Born: March 31, 1982 (age 43); Mansfield, Ohio, U.S.
- Occupation: Minor League Baseball Field Evaluator/Instructor
- Height: 5 ft 10 in (178 cm)

Mark Andrew Lollo (born March 31, 1982) is an American former professional baseball umpire who resides in New Lexington, Ohio. Before joining the Professional Baseball Umpire Corp. staff as a Minor League field evaluator/instructor in April 2014, Lollo worked as an umpire in the International League and served as a reserve umpire for Major League Baseball. He made his MLB debut on July 2, 2011.

== Early career ==
Prior to his post in the International League, Lollo served in the Gulf Coast, New York-Penn, Florida Instructional, South Atlantic, Carolina, Florida State, Texas, Eastern and Arizona Fall Leagues. He was the plate umpire for the 2012 Triple-A All-Star Game.

In 2008, Lollo umpired in the MLB Home Run Derby and MiLB Future's Game.

== See also ==
- List of Major League Baseball umpires (disambiguation)
