= 2002 College Baseball All-America Team =

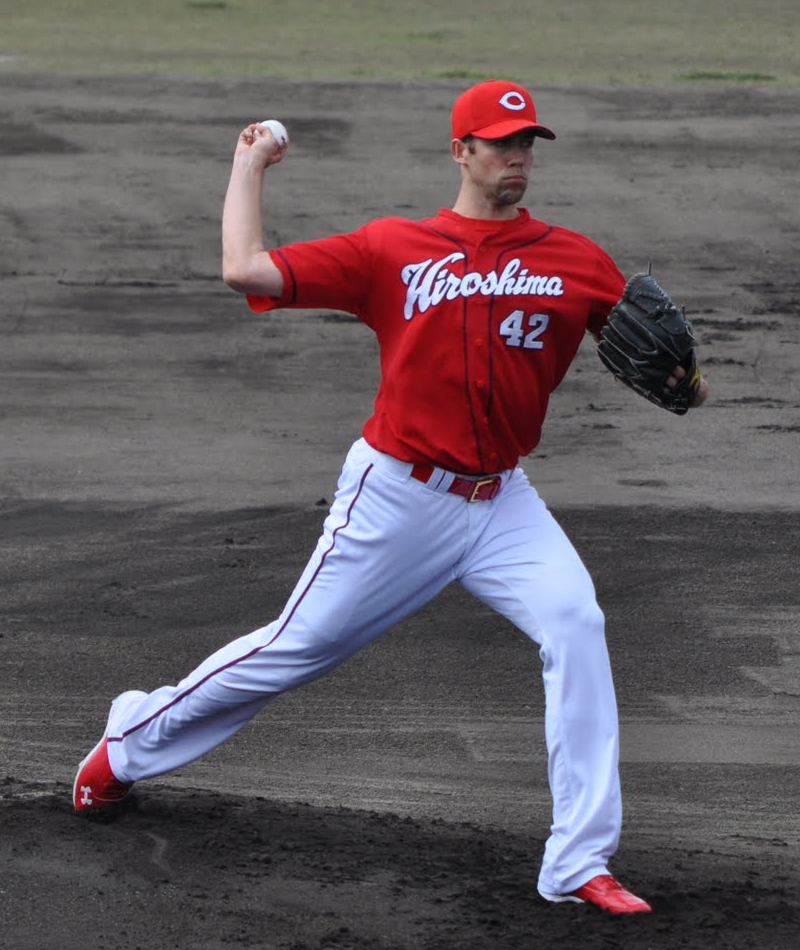
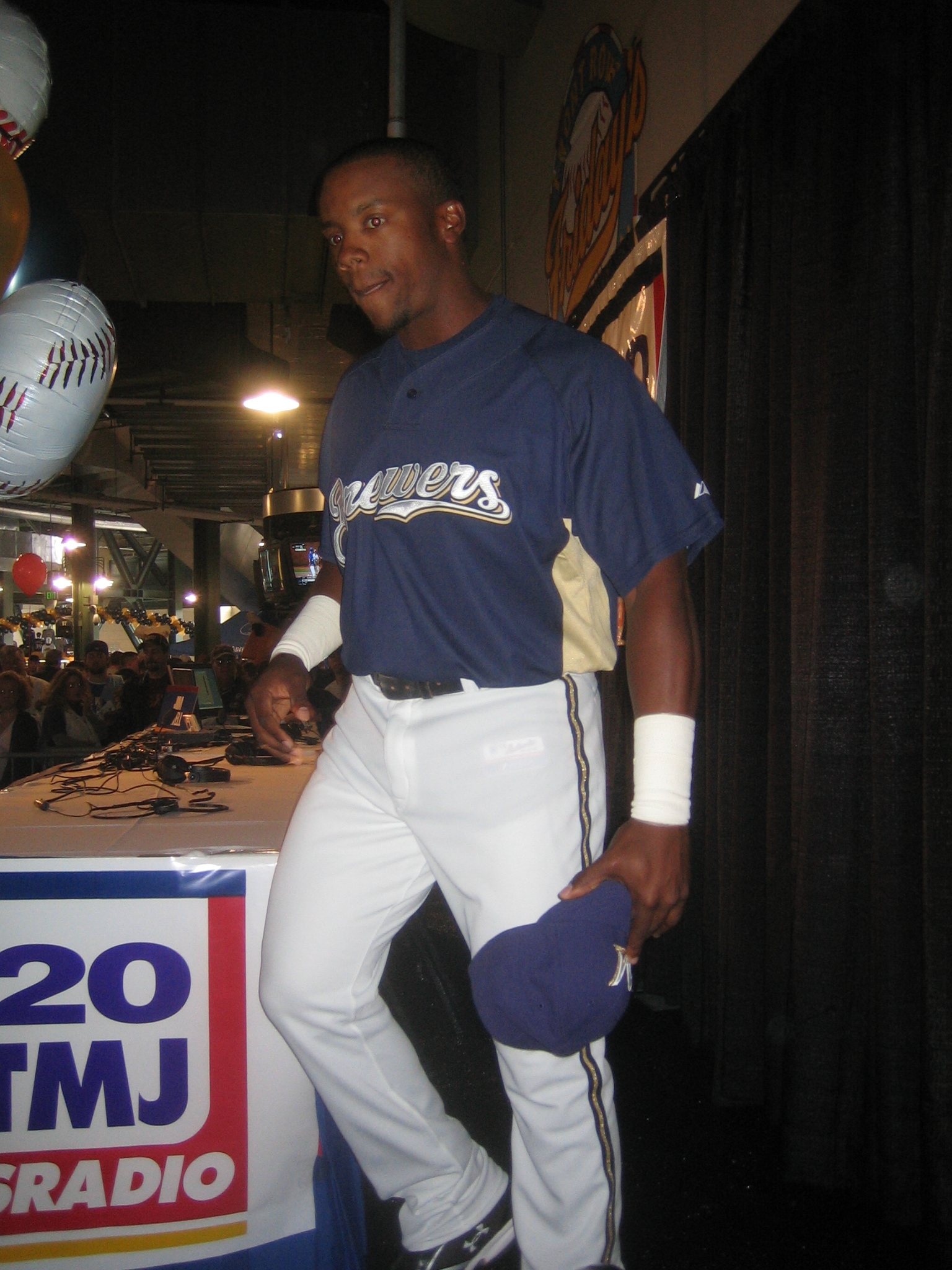
2002 All-Americans included 2002 MLB draft #1 pick Bryan Bullington (left) and MLB All-Star Rickie Weeks (right).

This is a list of college baseball players named first team All-Americans for the 2002 NCAA Division I baseball season. From 2002 to 2005, there were five generally recognized All-America selectors for baseball: the American Baseball Coaches Association, Baseball America, Collegiate Baseball Newspaper, the National Collegiate Baseball Writers Association, and USA Today Baseball Weekly. In order to be considered a "consensus" All-American, a player must have been selected by at least three of these.

== Key ==
A	American Baseball Coaches Association
B	Baseball America
C	Collegiate Baseball Newspaper
N	National Collegiate Baseball Writers Association
U	USA Today Baseball Weekly
	Member of the National College Baseball Hall of Fame
	Consensus All-American – selected by all five organizations
	Consensus All-American – selected by three or four organizations

== All-Americans ==
Position	Name	School	#	A	B	C	N	U	Other awards and honors
Starting pitcher	Bryan Bullington	Ball State	4	✓	✓	✓	✓	—	First overall pick in the 2002 MLB draft
Starting pitcher	Jeremy Guthrie	Stanford	3	✓	✓	✓	—	—	
Starting pitcher	Justin Simmons	Texas	4	✓	—	✓	✓	✓	
Starting pitcher	Tim Stauffer	Richmond	4	—	✓	✓	✓	✓	
Starting pitcher	Brad Sullivan	Houston	5	✓	✓	✓	✓	✓	
Starting pitcher	John Tetuan	Wichita State	1	—	—	✓	—	—	
Relief pitcher	Dave Bush	Wake Forest	2	✓	—	✓	—	—	
Relief pitcher	Royce Ring	San Diego State	2	—	✓	—	✓	—	
Relief pitcher	Blake Taylor	South Carolina	3	✓	—	—	✓	✓	
Catcher	Jed Morris	Nebraska	4	✓	—	✓	✓	✓	
Catcher	Tony Richie	Florida State	1	—	✓	—	—	—	
First baseman	Nate Gold	Gonzaga	1	—	—	✓	—	—	
First baseman	Yaron Peters	South Carolina	3	✓	✓	—	—	✓	
First baseman	Vincent Sinisi	Rice	1	—	—	—	✓	—	
Second baseman	Russ Adams	North Carolina	1	—	✓	—	—	—	
Second baseman / DH	Rickie Weeks	Southern	5	✓	✓	✓	✓	✓	
Shortstop	Khalil Greene	Clemson	5	✓	✓	✓	✓	✓	Dick Howser Trophy Golden Spikes Award ABCA Player of the Year Baseball America Player of the Year Collegiate Baseball Player of the Year Rotary Smith Award
Third baseman	Jeff Baker	Clemson	2	—	✓	—	✓	—	
Third baseman	Ryan Barthelemy	Florida State	3	✓	—	✓	—	✓	
Outfielder	Vito Chiaravalloti	Richmond	1	—	—	—	✓	—	
Outfielder	Sam Fuld	Stanford	3	✓	✓	—	—	✓	
Outfielder	Joey Gomes	Santa Clara	1	—	—	✓	—	—	
Outfielder	Ryan Kenning	New Mexico State	2	—	—	—	✓	✓	
Outfielder	Jeff Leise	Nebraska	1	✓	—	—	—	—	
Outfielder	Bob Malek	Michigan State	3	✓	✓	✓	—	—	
Outfielder	Steve Stanley	Notre Dame	5	✓	✓	✓	✓	✓	
Designated hitter	David Trujillo	UNLV	1	✓	—	—	—	—	
Designated hitter	Gabe Veloz	New Mexico State	1	—	—	✓	—	—	
Utility player	Jesse Crain	Houston	2	—	✓	—	—	✓	
Utility player	Chris Maples	North Carolina	1	—	—	✓	—	—	
Utility player	John McCurdy	Maryland	1	—	—	—	✓	—	

== See also ==
- List of college baseball awards
