= 2002 Big 12 Conference baseball tournament =

American college baseball tournament

- Teams: 8
- Format: Double elimination
- Finals site: Rangers Ballpark in Arlington; Arlington, Texas
- Champions: Texas (1st title)
- Winning coach: Augie Garrido (1st title)
- MVP: Dustin Majewski (Texas)
- Attendance: 150,196

2002 Big 12 Conference baseball standings
	Conf.				Overall
Team	W		L	PCT	W		L	PCT
No. 1 Texas ‍†‍‡‍^{y}	19	–	8	.704	57	–	15	.792
No. 8 Nebraska ‍‍‍^{y}	16	–	11	.593	47	–	21	.691
No. 24 Texas Tech ‍‍‍^{y}	16	–	11	.593	42	–	20	.677
Oklahoma ‍‍‍^{y}	15	–	12	.556	35	–	27	.565
Oklahoma State ‍‍‍	13	–	13	.500	37	–	21	.638
Kansas State ‍‍‍	13	–	13	.500	30	–	25	.545
Baylor ‍‍‍^{y}	13	–	13	.500	36	–	26	.581
Texas A&M ‍‍‍	13	–	14	.481	35	–	24	.593
Missouri ‍‍‍	9	–	16	.360	24	–	29	.453
Kansas ‍‍‍	5	–	21	.192	22	–	29	.431
† – Conference champion ‡ – Tournament champion y – Invited to the NCAA tournament As of June 30, 2002; Rankings from Collegiate Baseball

The 2002 Big 12 Conference baseball tournament was for the first time held at Rangers Ballpark in Arlington in Arlington, Texas, from May 22 through 26. Texas won their first tournament and earned the Big 12 Conference's automatic bid to the 2002 NCAA Division I baseball tournament. The tournament mirrored the format of the College World Series, with two 4-team double-elimination brackets and a final championship game. 2002 set an NCAA record for attendance at a conference tournament, with 150,196 people attending the 5-day event.

== Regular season standings ==
Place	Seed	Team	Conference				Overall		
Place	Seed	Team	W	L	%	GB	W	L	%
1	1	Texas	19	8	.704	–	57	15	.792
2	2	Nebraska	16	11	.593	3	47	21	.691
2	3	Texas Tech	16	11	.593	3	42	20	.677
4	4	Oklahoma	15	12	.556	4	35	27	.565
5	5	Oklahoma State	13	13	.500	5.5	37	21	.638
5	6	Kansas State	13	13	.500	5.5	30	25	.545
5	7	Baylor	13	13	.500	5.5	36	26	.581
8	8	Texas A&M	13	14	.481	6	35	24	.593
9	–	Missouri	9	16	.360	9	24	29	.453
10	–	Kansas	5	21	.192	13.5	22	29	.431

- Colorado and Iowa State did not sponsor baseball teams.

== Tournament ==
First round
3	Texas Tech	5
6	Kansas State	4
2	Nebraska	11
7	Baylor	9
6	Kansas State	6
7	Baylor	2
4	Oklahoma	11
5	Oklahoma State	3
8	Texas A&M	8
1	Texas	4
5	Oklahoma State	6
1	Texas	8

Second round
3	Texas Tech	8
2	Nebraska	12
6	Kansas State	7
3	Texas Tech	6
4	Oklahoma	9
8	Texas A&M	1
1	Texas	9
8	Texas A&M	4

Semifinals
2	Nebraska	8	-
6	Kansas State	7	-
4	Oklahoma	1	5
1	Texas	2	8

Finals
2	Nebraska	6*
1	Texas	9*

- * indicates extra-inning game.
- Kansas and Missouri did not make the tournament.

== All-Tournament Team ==
Position	Player	School
1B	Jeff Ontiveros	Texas
2B	Will Bolt	Nebraska
3B	Jake Brown	Texas Tech
SS	Osmar Castillo	Kansas State
C	John Grose	Nebraska
OF	Dustin Majewski	Texas
OF	Jason Fransz	Oklahoma
OF	Pat Mahoney	Kansas State
DH	J.D. Reininger	Texas
UT	Ty Soto	Kansas State
P	Ray Clark	Texas
P	Mark Roberts	Oklahoma
P	Huston Street	Texas
MOP	Dustin Majewski	Texas

== See also ==
- College World Series
- NCAA Division I Baseball Championship
- Big 12 Conference baseball tournament
