= 2003 College Baseball All-America Team =

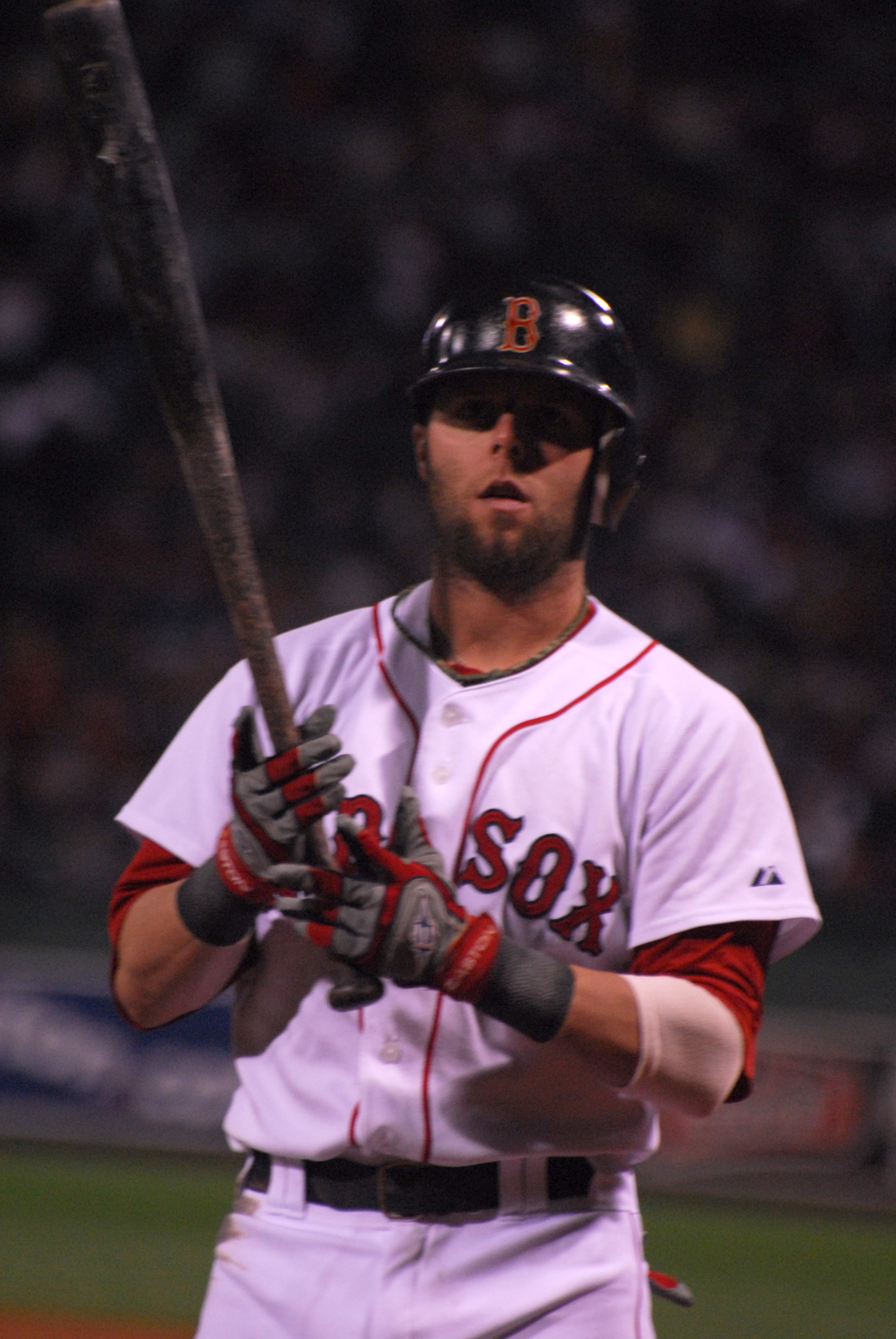
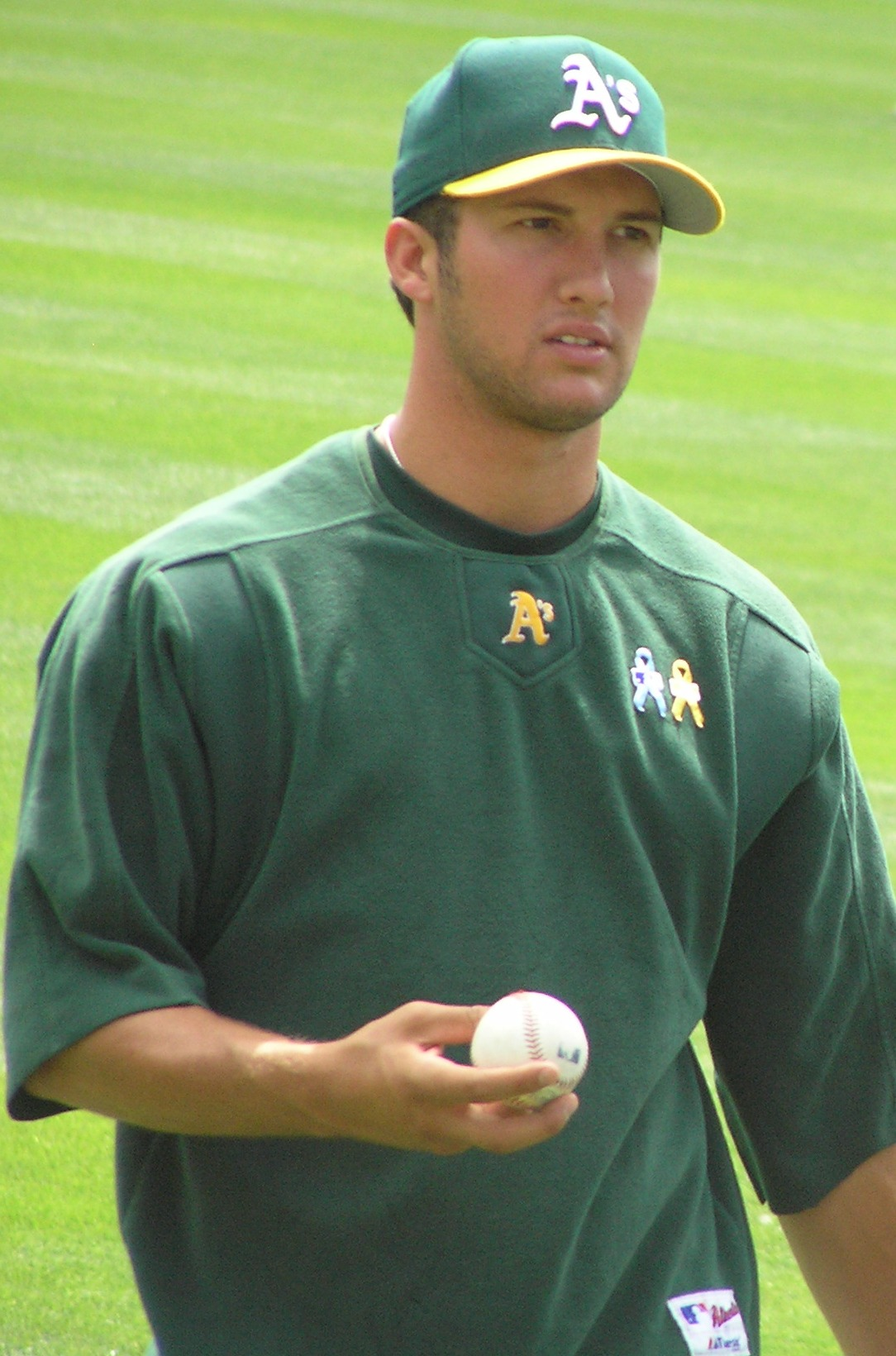
2003 All-Americans included 2008 AL MVP Dustin Pedroia (left) and 2005 AL Rookie of the Year Huston Street (right).

This is a list of college baseball players named first team All-Americans for the 2003 NCAA Division I baseball season. From 2002 to 2005, there were five generally recognized All-America selectors for baseball: the American Baseball Coaches Association, Baseball America, Collegiate Baseball Newspaper, the National Collegiate Baseball Writers Association, and USA Today Sports Weekly. In order to be considered a "consensus" All-American, a player must have been selected by at least three of these.

== Key ==
A	American Baseball Coaches Association
B	Baseball America
C	Collegiate Baseball Newspaper
N	National Collegiate Baseball Writers Association
U	USA Today Sports Weekly
	Member of the National College Baseball Hall of Fame
	Consensus All-American – selected by all five organizations
	Consensus All-American – selected by three or four organizations

== All-Americans ==
Position	Name	School	#	A	B	C	N	U	Other awards and honors
Starting pitcher	Scott Lewis	Ohio State	2	✓	—	✓	—	—	
Starting pitcher	David Marchbanks	South Carolina	3	—	✓	✓	✓	—	
Starting pitcher	Jeff Niemann	Rice	5	✓	✓	✓	✓	✓	
Starting pitcher	Tim Stauffer	Richmond	4	✓	—	✓	✓	✓	
Starting pitcher	Vern Sterry	NC State	1	—	—	✓	—	—	
Starting pitcher	Wade Townsend	Rice	2	—	✓	—	—	✓	
Starting pitcher	Jered Weaver	Long Beach State	4	✓	✓	✓	✓	—	
Relief pitcher	Matt Daulton	Virginia Tech	1	—	—	—	✓	—	
Relief pitcher	Steven Register	Auburn	1	—	—	—	✓	—	
Relief pitcher	Huston Street	Texas	1	✓	—	—	—	—	College World Series Most Outstanding Player
Relief pitcher	Ryan Wagner	Houston	4	✓	✓	✓	—	✓	
Catcher	Ryan Garko	Stanford	5	✓	✓	✓	✓	✓	Johnny Bench Award
First baseman	Mike Aubrey	Tulane	2	✓	✓	—	—	—	
First baseman	Billy Becher	New Mexico State	3	—	—	✓	✓	✓	
Second baseman	Rickie Weeks	Southern	5	✓	✓	✓	✓	✓	Dick Howser Trophy Golden Spikes Award ABCA Player of the Year Baseball America Player of the Year Collegiate Baseball Player of the Year Rotary Smith Award
Shortstop	Aaron Hill	LSU	1	—	✓	—	—	—	
Shortstop	Dustin Pedroia	Arizona State	4	✓	—	✓	✓	✓	
Third baseman	Jamie D'Antona	Wake Forest	4	✓	—	✓	✓	✓	
Third baseman	Brian Snyder	Stetson	1	—	✓	—	—	—	
Outfielder	Josh Anderson	Eastern Kentucky	1	—	—	✓	—	—	
Outfielder	Michael Brown	William & Mary	1	—	—	—	✓	—	
Outfielder	Jeremy Cleveland	North Carolina	1	✓	—	—	—	—	
Outfielder	Jeff Cook	Southern Miss	1	—	—	—	—	✓	
Outfielder	Jordan Foster	Lamar	2	—	—	✓	—	✓	
Outfielder	Clint King	Southern Miss	3	✓	—	—	✓	✓	
Outfielder	Dustin Majewski	Texas	4	✓	✓	—	✓	✓	
Outfielder	David Murphy	Baylor	3	✓	✓	—	✓	—	
Outfielder	Brad Snyder	Ball State	2	—	✓	✓	—	—	
Designated hitter	Ryan Gordon	UNC Greensboro	1	—	—	✓	—	—	
Designated hitter	Jeremy West	Arizona State	1	✓	—	—	—	—	
Utility player	Scott Beerer	Texas A&M	3	—	✓	✓	—	✓	
Utility player	Beau Hearod	Alabama	1	—	—	—	✓	—	
Utility player	Mitch Maier	Toledo	2	✓	✓	—	—	—	

== See also ==
- List of college baseball awards
