= 2002 Atlantic Coast Conference baseball tournament =

American college baseball tournament

- 2002 ACC Baseball Championship Logo
- Teams: 9
- Format: Single-elimination play-in game Double-elimination tournament
- Finals site: Florida Power Park; St. Petersburg, FL
- Champions: Florida State Seminoles (3rd title)
- Winning coach: Mike Martin (3rd title)
- MVP: Stephen Drew (Florida State Seminoles)

2002 Atlantic Coast Conference baseball standings
	Conf.				Overall
Team	W		L	PCT	W		L	PCT
No. 9 Florida State ‍†‍‡‍^{y}	18	–	6	.750	60	–	14	.811
No. 14 Wake Forest ‍‍‍^{y}	17	–	6	.739	47	–	13	.783
No. 19 North Carolina ‍‍‍^{y}	17	–	7	.708	43	–	21	.672
No. 3 Clemson ‍‍‍^{y}	16	–	8	.667	54	–	17	.761
No. 5 Georgia Tech ‍‍‍^{y}	14	–	9	.609	52	–	16	.765
Virginia ‍‍‍	8	–	16	.333	25	–	32	.439
NC State ‍‍‍	7	–	17	.292	33	–	26	.559
Maryland ‍‍‍	6	–	18	.250	34	–	23	.596
Duke ‍‍‍	4	–	20	.167	24	–	34	.414
† – Conference champion ‡ – Tournament champion y – Invited to the NCAA tournament As of June 30, 2002; Rankings from Collegiate Baseball

The 2002 Atlantic Coast Conference baseball tournament was held at the Florida Power Park in St. Petersburg, Florida, from May 21 through 26. Florida State won the tournament and earned the Atlantic Coast Conference's automatic bid to the 2002 NCAA Division I baseball tournament.

== Tournament ==
- The two teams with the worst records in regular season conference play faced each other in a single elimination situation to earn the 8th spot in the conference tournament.

=== Seeding procedure ===
From TheACC.com:

On Saturday (The Semifinals) of the ACC Baseball Tournament, the match-up between the four remaining teams is determined by previous opponents. If teams have played previously in the tournament, every attempt will be made to avoid a repeat match-up between teams, regardless of seed. If it is impossible to avoid a match-up that already occurred, then the determination is based on avoiding the most recent, current tournament match-up, regardless of seed. If no match-ups have occurred, the team left in the winners bracket will play the lowest seeded team from the losers bracket.

- If the winner of winners bracket quarterfinal match loses in the winners bracket semifinal match, that team will play the winner of the finals match for the championship in a winner-take-all situation

=== Bracket ===
Play-in game
8	Maryland	9
9	Duke	10

Upper round 1
1	Florida State	10
9	Duke	7
4	Clemson	10
5	Georgia Tech	0
2	Wake Forest	12
7	NC State	4
3	North Carolina	11
6	Virginia	10

Upper round 2
1	Florida State	9
4	Clemson	4
2	Wake Forest	9
3	North Carolina	7
Lower round 1
9	Duke	1
5	Georgia Tech	6
7	NC State	6
6	Virginia	5

Upper final
1	Florida State	5
2	Wake Forest	2
Lower round 2
3	North Carolina	8
5	Georgia Tech	10
4	Clemson	5
7	NC State	3

Semifinals
5	Georgia Tech	4
1	Florida State	7
2	Wake Forest	6
4	Clemson	8

Final
4	Clemson	1
1	Florida State	4

== All-Tournament Team ==
Position	Player	School
1B	Michael Johnson	Clemson
2B	Nick Blue	Wake Forest
3B	Ryan Barthelemy	Florida State
SS	Stephen Drew	Florida State
C	Tony Richie	Florida State
OF	Adam Bourassa	Wake Forest
OF	Ryan Johnson	Wake Forest
OF	Wes Rynders	Georgia Tech
DH	Khalil Greene	Clemson
P	Matt Lynch	Florida State
P	Steve Reba	Florida State
MVP	Stephen Drew	Florida State

(*)Denotes Unanimous Selection

== See also ==
- College World Series
- NCAA Division I Baseball Championship
