= 2002 Texas Longhorns baseball team =

American college baseball season

2002 Texas Longhorns baseball

National champions Big 12 Conference champions Big 12 Conference tournament champions Austin Super Regional champions Austin Regional champions
- Conference: Big 12 Conference

Ranking
- Coaches: No. 1
- CB: No. 1
- Record: 57–15 (19–8 Big 12)
- Head coach: Augie Garrido (6th year)
- Assistant coach: Tommy Harmon (13th year); Frank Anderson (3rd year)
- Home stadium: UFCU Disch–Falk Field

2002 Big 12 Conference baseball standings
	Conf.				Overall
Team	W		L	PCT	W		L	PCT
No. 1 Texas ‍†‍‡‍^{y}	19	–	8	.704	57	–	15	.792
No. 8 Nebraska ‍‍‍^{y}	16	–	11	.593	47	–	21	.691
No. 24 Texas Tech ‍‍‍^{y}	16	–	11	.593	42	–	20	.677
Oklahoma ‍‍‍^{y}	15	–	12	.556	35	–	27	.565
Oklahoma State ‍‍‍	13	–	13	.500	37	–	21	.638
Kansas State ‍‍‍	13	–	13	.500	30	–	25	.545
Baylor ‍‍‍^{y}	13	–	13	.500	36	–	26	.581
Texas A&M ‍‍‍	13	–	14	.481	35	–	24	.593
Missouri ‍‍‍	9	–	16	.360	24	–	29	.453
Kansas ‍‍‍	5	–	21	.192	22	–	29	.431
† – Conference champion ‡ – Tournament champion y – Invited to the NCAA tournament As of June 30, 2002; Rankings from Collegiate Baseball

The 2002 Texas Longhorns baseball team represented the University of Texas at Austin in the 2002 NCAA Division I baseball season. The Longhorns played their home games at UFCU Disch-Falk Field. The team was coached by Augie Garrido in his 6th season at Texas.

The Longhorns won the College World Series with a 12–6 victory over South Carolina.

== Roster ==
2002 Texas Longhorns baseball team
Players
Coaches

#	Pos.	Name	B/T	Height	Weight	Year	Home town
29	RHP	Alan Bomer	R/R	6 ft 3 in (1.91 m)	203 lb (92 kg)	Jr	Altoona, IA
31	OF	Chris Carmichael	L/L	5 ft 9 in (1.75 m)	182 lb (83 kg)	Sr	Decatur, GA
10	RHP	Ray Clark	R/R	6 ft 3 in (1.91 m)	187 lb (85 kg)	Jr	Grapevine, TX
46	LHP	Buck Cody	L/L	6 ft 2 in (1.88 m)	188 lb (85 kg)	Fr	Oklahoma City, OK
13	RHP	Luis Cortez	R/R	6 ft 0 in (1.83 m)	192 lb (87 kg)	Fr	Sinton, TX
11	OF	Christopher Townsend	L/L	6 ft 0 in (1.83 m)	198 lb (90 kg)	Jr	Austin, TX
37	OF	Nic Crosta	R/R	6 ft 2 in (1.88 m)	206 lb (93 kg)	Fr	Seattle, WA
41	LHP	Geno Espineli	L/L	6 ft 4 in (1.93 m)	187 lb (85 kg)	So	Katy, TX
4	INF	Brandon Fahey	R/R	6 ft 1 in (1.85 m)	161 lb (73 kg)	Jr	Dallas, TX
47	OF	Shawn Ferguson	R/R	6 ft 2 in (1.88 m)	208 lb (94 kg)	Fr	Houston, TX
6	OF	Joe Ferin	L/L	5 ft 10 in (1.78 m)	175 lb (79 kg)	Fr	Ankeny, IA
5	RHP	Ryan France	R/R	6 ft 2 in (1.88 m)	196 lb (89 kg)	Sr	Austin, TX
34	RHP	Kevin Frizzell	R/R	6 ft 3 in (1.91 m)	205 lb (93 kg)	Jr	Georgetown, TX
35	LHP	Brad Halsey	L/L	6 ft 2 in (1.88 m)	179 lb (81 kg)	Jr	Houston, TX
14	INF	Michael Hollimon	R/R	6 ft 1 in (1.85 m)	176 lb (80 kg)	Fr	Dallas, TX
39	C	Ryan Hubele	R/R	5 ft 11 in (1.8 m)	186 lb (84 kg)	Jr	Paradise Valley, AZ
20	INF	Seth Johnston	R/R	6 ft 3 in (1.91 m)	183 lb (83 kg)	Fr	Fair Oaks Ranch, TX
26	LHP	Brantley Jordan	L/L	6 ft 0 in (1.83 m)	184 lb (83 kg)	Jr	Austin, TX
2	OF	Ben King	L/L	6 ft 2 in (1.88 m)	185 lb (84 kg)	Jr	Grapevine, TX
23	OF	Dustin Majewski	L/L	5 ft 11 in (1.8 m)	190 lb (86 kg)	Jr	Brenham, TX
28	RHP	Tim McGough	R/R	6 ft 0 in (1.83 m)	193 lb (88 kg)	So	Fort Worth, TX
9	RHP	Jesen Merle	R/R	6 ft 0 in (1.83 m)	194 lb (88 kg)	Jr	Garland, TX
1	INF	Tim Moss	R/R	5 ft 11 in (1.8 m)	177 lb (80 kg)	So	Lancaster, TX
7	RHP	Daniel Muegge	L/R	6 ft 5 in (1.96 m)	175 lb (79 kg)	Jr	Brenham, TX
2	OF	Kalani Napoleon	L/L	5 ft 9 in (1.75 m)	187 lb (85 kg)	Sr	Aurora, CO
32	INF	Chris Neuman	L/L	6 ft 1 in (1.85 m)	202 lb (92 kg)	So	Fort Worth, TX
40	INF	Jeff Ontiveros	R/R	6 ft 0 in (1.83 m)	229 lb (104 kg)	Sr	Round Rock, TX
24	INF	Omar Quintanilla	R/R	5 ft 9 in (1.75 m)	185 lb (84 kg)	So	El Paso, TX
48	INF	J.D. Reininger	R/R	5 ft 10 in (1.78 m)	183 lb (83 kg)	Fr	Spring Branch, TX
8	OF	Matt Rosenberg	L/L	6 ft 0 in (1.83 m)	171 lb (78 kg)	Sr	Grand Junction, CO
43	OF	Chris Scorfield	R/R	6 ft 1 in (1.85 m)	176 lb (80 kg)	Fr	Fort Worth, TX
30	LHP	Justin Simmons	L/L	6 ft 3 in (1.91 m)	217 lb (98 kg)	So	DeSoto, TX
25	RHP	Huston Street	R/R	6 ft 0 in (1.83 m)	179 lb (81 kg)	Fr	Austin, TX
11	OF	Eric Sultmeider	R/R	6 ft 2 in (1.88 m)	183 lb (83 kg)	So	New Braunfels, TX
42	RHP	Chas Taylor	R/R	6 ft 3 in (1.91 m)	180 lb (82 kg)	Fr	Austin, TX
27	C	Curtis Thigpen	R/R	5 ft 11 in (1.8 m)	173 lb (78 kg)	Fr	Forney, TX

Head coach

16 Augie Garrido (6th year)

Assistant coach(es)

22 Tommy Harmon (13th year)
3 Frank Anderson (3rd year)

Legend

- (C) Team captain
- (S) Suspended
- (I) Ineligible
- Injured
- Current redshirt

== Schedule ==
2002 Texas Longhorns baseball game log (57–15)
Regular season (43–13)
February (13–2)

Date	Opponent	Rank	Site/stadium	Score	UT decision	Attendance	Overall record	Big 12 record
February 6	Concordia	No. 14	Disch-Falk Field	W 7–1	Simmons (W; 1–0)	3,315	1–0	–
February 6	Concordia	No. 14	Disch-Falk Field	W 7–1	Bomer (W; 1–0)	3,315	2–0	–
February 8	vs. TCU	No. 14	Minute Maid Park	L 1–8	Clark (L; 0–1)	12,573	2–1	–
February 9	vs. Houston	No. 14	Minute Maid Park	W 7–6	McGough (W; 1–0)	15,428	3–1	–
February 10	vs. Louisiana–Lafayette	No. 14	Minute Maid Park	L 3–4	Jordan (L; 0–1)	10,409	3–2	–
February 12	Texas A&M–CC	No. 20	Disch-Falk Field	W 14–2	Simmons (W; 2–0)	3,308	4–2	–
February 15	Sam Houston State	No. 20	Disch-Falk Field	W 3–2	Merle (W; 1–0)	3,388	5–2	–
February 16	Sam Houston State	No. 20	Disch-Falk Field	W 23–0	Bomer (W; 2–0)	3,777	6–2	–
February 17	Sam Houston State	No. 20	Disch-Falk Field	W 13–1	Halsey (W; 1–0)	3,738	7–2	–
February 19	UTSA	No. 18	Disch-Falk Field	W 20–3	Espinelli (W; 1–0)	3,348	8–2	–
February 20	Northwestern State	No. 18	Disch-Falk Field	W 3–2	France (W; 1–0)	3,384	9–2	–
February 22	Loyola Marymount	No. 18	Disch-Falk Field	W 10–1	Simmons (W; 3–0)	3,503	10–2	–
February 23	Loyola Marymount	No. 18	Disch-Falk Field	W 17–3	Bomer (W; 3–0)	4,204	11–2	–
February 24	Loyola Marymount	No. 18	Disch-Falk Field	W 8–2	Halsey (W; 2–0)	3,739	12–2	–
February 26	Texas A&M–CC	No. 9	Disch-Falk Field	W 12–2	Clark (W; 1–1)	3,210	13–2	–

March (12–6)

Date	Opponent	Rank	Site/stadium	Score	UT decision	Attendance	Overall record	Big 12 record
March 1	at No. 23 Baylor	No. 9	Baylor Ballpark	L 4–5	Merle (L; 1–1)	3,361	13–3	0–1
March 2	No. 23 Baylor	No. 9	Disch-Falk Field	W 4–3	Simmons (W; 4–0)	4,013	14–3	1–1
March 3	No. 23 Baylor	No. 9	Disch-Falk Field	L 4–11	Bomer (L; 3–1)	3,774	14–4	1–2
March 5	Winthrop	No. 15	Disch-Falk Field	W 2–1	Street (W; 1–0)	3,498	15–4	–
March 8	at Texas Tech	No. 15	Dan Law Field	L 5–10	Street (L; 1–1)	3,498	15–5	1–3
March 9	at Texas Tech	No. 15	Dan Law Field	W 6–3	Simmons (W; 5–0)	3,429	16–5	2–3
March 10	at Texas Tech	No. 15	Dan Law Field	L 0–9	Clark (L; 1–2)	3,429	16–6	2–4
March 12	vs. TCU	No. 19	Dell Diamond	W 5–1	Espinelli (W; 2–0)	3,661	17–6	–
March 15	at Missouri	No. 19	Taylor Stadium	W 15–0	Halsey (W; 3–0)	384	18–6	3–4
March 16	at Missouri	No. 19	Taylor Stadium	W 6–3	Simmons (W; 6–0)	378	19–6	4–4
March 17	at Missouri	No. 19	Taylor Stadium	W 7–2	Clark (W; 2–2)	393	20–6	5–4
March 19	McNeese State	No. 15	Disch-Falk Field	W 14–0	Espinelli (W; 3–0)	3,342	21–6	–
March 22	Texas–Pan American	No. 15	Disch-Falk Field	W 10–0	Halsey (W; 4–0)	3,402	22–6	–
March 23	Texas–Pan American	No. 15	Disch-Falk Field	W 9–0	Simmons (W; 7–0)	4,634	23–6	–
March 24	Texas–Pan American	No. 15	Disch-Falk Field	W 20–0	Clark (W; 3–2)	4,085	24–6	–
March 28	at No. 2 Stanford	No. 14	Sunken Diamond	L 6–7	Bomer (L; 3–2)	2,310	24–7	–
March 29	at No. 2 Stanford	No. 14	Sunken Diamond	W 2–0	Simmons (W; 8–0)	2,828	25–7	–
March 30	at No. 2 Stanford	No. 14	Sunken Diamond	L 2–7	Clark (W; 3–3)	3,280	25–8	–

April (13–3)

Date	Opponent	Rank	Site/stadium	Score	UT decision	Attendance	Overall record	Big 12 record
April 2	UTSA	No. 15	Disch-Falk Field	W 11–1	Bomer (W; 4–2)	3,691	26–8	–
April 5	Kansas	No. 15	Disch-Falk Field	L 3–5	Halsey (L; 4–1)	3,659	26–9	5–5
April 6	Kansas	No. 15	Disch-Falk Field	W 8–3	Simmons (W; 9–0)	5,116	27–9	6–5
April 6	Kansas	No. 15	Disch-Falk Field	W 5–4	Street (W; 2–1)	5,116	28–9	7–5
April 9	No. 4 Rice	No. 15	Disch-Falk Field	W 3–2	Jordan (W; 1–1)	4,154	29–9	–
April 12	at No. 23 Oklahoma	No. 15	Mitchell Park	L 5–6	Merle (L; 1–2)	2,225	29–10	7–6
April 14	at No. 23 Oklahoma	No. 15	Mitchell Park	W 8–2	Simmons (W; 10–0)	1,850	30–10	8–6
April 14	at No. 23 Oklahoma	No. 15	Mitchell Park	W 8–1	Bomer (W; 5–2)	2,517	31–10	9–6
April 19	at Kansas State	No. 14	Tointon Family Stadium	W 6–0	Halsey (W; 5–1)	114	32–10	10–6
April 21	at Kansas State	No. 14	Tointon Family Stadium	W 8–4	Simmons (W; 11–0)	333	33–10	11–6
April 21	at Kansas State	No. 14	Tointon Family Stadium	W 8–2	Bomer (W; 6–2)	333	34–10	12–6
April 23	Southwest Texas St.	No. 8	Disch-Falk Field	L 0–2	Clark (L; 3–4)	4,484	34-11	–
April 26	No. 16 Oklahoma State	No. 8	Disch-Falk Field	W 3–2	Halsey (W; 6–1)	4,678	35–11	13–6
April 27	No. 16 Oklahoma State	No. 8	Disch-Falk Field	W 2–1	Simmons (W; 12–0)	4,719	36–11	14–6
April 28	No. 16 Oklahoma State	No. 8	Disch-Falk Field	W 7–4	Bomer (W; 7–2)	4,440	37–11	15–6
April 30	vs. TCU	No. 5	Dell Diamond	W 14–8	Muegge (W; 1–0)	2,764	38–11	–

May (5–2)

Date	Opponent	Rank	Site/stadium	Score	UT decision	Attendance	Overall record	Big 12 record
May 3	No. 15 Nebraska	No. 5	Disch-Falk Field	L 3–8	Halsey (L; 6–2)	4,671	38–12	15–7
May 4	No. 15 Nebraska	No. 5	Disch-Falk Field	W 3–2	Simmons (W; 13–0)	4,891	39–12	16–7
May 5	No. 15 Nebraska	No. 5	Disch-Falk Field	L 5–7	Bomer (L; 7–3)	4,740	39–13	16–8
May 14	at No. 4 Rice	No. 8	Reckling Park	W 4–2	Muegge (W; 2–0)	4,610	40–13	-
May 17	No. 24 Texas A&M	No. 8	Disch-Falk Field	W 5–1	Simmons (W; 14–0)	6,709	41–13	17–8
May 18	at No. 24 Texas A&M	No. 8	Olsen Field	W 7–3	Merle (W; 2–0)	7,136	42–13	18–8
May 19	at No. 24 Texas A&M	No. 8	Olsen Field	W 7–4	Espinelli (W; 4–0)	5,922	43–13	19–8

Post-season (14–2)
Big 12 tournament (5–1)

Date	Opponent	Seed/Rank	Site/stadium	Score	UT decision	Attendance	Overall record	B12T record
May 22	vs. (8) Texas A&M	(1) No. 5	Rangers Ballpark in Arlington	L 4–8	Simmons (L; 14–1)	13,641	43–14	0–1
May 23	vs. (5) Oklahoma State	(1) No. 5	Rangers Ballpark in Arlington	W 8–6	Street (W; 3–1)	7,411	44–14	1–1
May 24	vs. (8) Texas A&M	(1) No. 5	Rangers Ballpark in Arlington	W 9–4	Bomer (W; 8–3)	12,731	45–14	2–1
May 25	vs. (4) No. 27 Oklahoma	(1) No. 5	Rangers Ballpark in Arlington	W 2–1	Clark (W; 4–4)	12,846	46–14	3–1
May 25	vs. (4) No. 27 Oklahoma	(1) No. 5	Rangers Ballpark in Arlington	W 8–5	Espinelli (W; 5–0)	10,220	47–14	4–1
May 26	vs. (2) No. 13 Nebraska	(1) No. 5	Rangers Ballpark in Arlington	W 9–6	Street (W; 4–1)	13,327	48–14	5–1

NCAA tournament: Austin Regional (3–0)

Date	Opponent	Seed/Rank	Site/stadium	Score	UT decision	Attendance	Overall record	NCAAT record
May 31	vs. (4) Central Connecticut St.	(1) No. 3	Disch-Falk Field	W 7–2	Halsey (W; 7–2)	6,712	49–14	1–0
June 1	vs. (2) Baylor	(1) No. 3	Disch-Falk Field	W 10–8	Clark (W; 5–4)	6,848	50–14	2–0
June 2	vs. (2) Baylor	(1) No. 3	Disch-Falk Field	W 2–0	Bomer (W; 9–3)	7,223	51–14	3–0

NCAA tournament: Austin Super Regional (2–1)

Date	Opponent	Seed/Rank	Site/stadium	Score	UT decision	Attendance	Overall record	NCAAT record
June 7	vs. No. 6 Houston	(5) No. 3	Disch-Falk Field	L 0–2	Merle (L; 2–3)	7,209	51–15	3–1
June 8	vs. No. 6 Houston	(5) No. 3	Disch-Falk Field	W 17–2	Clark (W; 6–4)	7,374	52–15	4–1
June 9	vs. No. 6 Houston	(5) No. 3	Disch-Falk Field	W 5–2	Bomer (W; 10–3)	7,277	53–15	5–1

NCAA tournament: College World Series (4–0)

Date	Opponent	Seed/Rank	Site/stadium	Score	UT decision	Attendance	Overall record	CWS record
June 15	vs. (4) No. 1 Rice	(5) No. 2	Rosenblatt Stadium	W 2–1	Simmons (W; 15–1)	24,067	54–15	1–0
June 17	vs. (8) No. 5 Stanford	(5) No. 2	Rosenblatt Stadium	W 8–7	Bomer (W; 11–3)	24,971	55–15	2–0
June 20	vs. (8) No. 5 Stanford	(5) No. 2	Rosenblatt Stadium	W 6–5	Merle (W; 13–3)	21,554	56–15	3–0
June 22	vs. (6) No. 3 South Carolina	(5) No. 2	Rosenblatt Stadium	W 12–6	Simmons (W; 16–1)	24,089	57–15	4–0

== Postseason ==
=== Big 12 tournament ===
First round
3	Texas Tech	5
6	Kansas State	4
2	Nebraska	11
7	Baylor	9
6	Kansas State	6
7	Baylor	2
4	Oklahoma	11
5	Oklahoma State	3
8	Texas A&M	8
1	Texas	4
5	Oklahoma State	6
1	Texas	8

Second round
3	Texas Tech	8
2	Nebraska	12
6	Kansas State	7
3	Texas Tech	6
4	Oklahoma	9
8	Texas A&M	1
1	Texas	9
8	Texas A&M	4

Semifinals
2	Nebraska	8	-
6	Kansas State	7	-
4	Oklahoma	1	5
1	Texas	2	8

Finals
2	Nebraska	6*
1	Texas	9*

- * indicates extra-inning game.
- Kansas and Missouri did not make the tournament.

=== NCAA tournament ===
==== Austin super regional ====
First round	Second round
1	Texas	7
4	Central Connecticut	2
1	Texas	10
2	Baylor	8
3	Lamar	2
2	Baylor	4
Austin Regional–Disch–Falk Field
4	Central Connecticut	4
3	Lamar	9
3	Lamar	9
2	Baylor	10
1	Houston	9
4	New Mexico State	0
1	Houston	8
2	Arizona State	4
3	San Diego	3
2	Arizona State	6
†Mesa Regional–HoHoKam Park
4	New Mexico State	1
3	San Diego	2
3	San Diego	1
2	Arizona State	11

Regional finals
1	Texas	2	—
2	Baylor	0	—
1	Houston	8	—
2	Arizona State	3	—

Super regionals
5	Texas	0	17	5
Houston	2	2	2

†Arizona State hosted at HoHoKam Park in Mesa, Arizona, where they played their 2002 season due to construction at Packard Stadium.

==== College World Series ====
First round
Notre Dame	3
8	Stanford	4
5	Texas	2
4	Rice	1
Notre Dame	5
4	Rice	3
2	Clemson	11
Nebraska	10
6	South Carolina	0
Georgia Tech	11
Nebraska	8
6	South Carolina	10

Second round
8	Stanford	7
5	Texas	8
Notre Dame	3
8	Stanford	5
2	Clemson	9
Georgia Tech	7
6	South Carolina	9
Georgia Tech	5

Semifinals
5	Texas	6	—
8	Stanford	5	—
2	Clemson	4	2
6	South Carolina	12	10

Finals
5	Texas	12
6	South Carolina	6

==== CWS championship game ====
Saturday, June 22, 2002 12:40 pm (CT) at Johnny Rosenblatt Stadium in Omaha, Nebraska
Team	1	2	3	4	5	6	7	8	9	R	H	E
South Carolina	1	1	0	0	0	0	2	2	0	6	10	3
Texas	3	1	0	0	3	1	0	4	X	12	13	2
WP: Justin Simmons (16–1) LP: Aaron Rawl (7–2) Sv: Huston Street (14); Attendance: 24,089; Notes: Texas wins fifth CWS title Boxscore

== Awards and honors ==
Ray Clark

- Big 12 All-Tournament Team

Eugene Espinelli

- All-Big 12 Honorable Mention

Brad Halsey

- All-Big 12 Second Team

Michael Hollimon

- All-Big 12 Second Team

Ryan Hubele

- All-Big 12 Honorable Mention

Dustin Majewski

- College World Series All-Tournament Team
- All-America Third Team
- All-Big 12 Honorable Mention
- Big 12 tournament Most Outstanding Player

Tim Moss

- College World Series All-Tournament Team
- ABCA Midwest All-Region Team First Team
- All-Big 12 First Team

Jeff Ontiveros

- ABCA Midwest All-Region Team Second Team
- All-Big 12 Second Team
- Big 12 All-Tournament Team

Omar Quintanilla

- College World Series All-Tournament Team
- ABCA Midwest All-Region Team Second Team
- All-Big 12 Second Team

J.D. Reininger

- All-Big 12 Honorable Mention
- Big 12 Freshman Player of the Year
- Big 12 All-Tournament Team

Justin Simmons

- College World Series All-Tournament Team
- All-America First Team
- ABCA Midwest All-Region Team First Team
- Big 12 Pitcher of the Year

Huston Street

- College World Series Most Outstanding Player
- All-Big 12 First Team
- Big 12 Freshman Pitcher of the Year
- Big 12 All-Tournament Team

== Longhorns in the 2002 MLB draft ==
The following members of the Texas Longhorns baseball program were drafted in the 2002 Major League Baseball draft.

Player	Position	Round	Overall	MLB team
Alan Bomer	RHP	4th	126th	New York Yankees
Ryan Hubele	C	8th	226th	Baltimore Orioles
Brad Halsey	LHP	8th	246th	New York Yankees
Brandon Fahey	3B	12th	346th	Baltimore Orioles
Dusin Majewski	OF	12th	358th	Boston Red Sox
Ray Clark	RHP	14th	426th	New York Yankees
Benjamin King	LHP	20th	606th	New York Yankees
Danny Muegge	RHP	41st	1237th	San Francisco Giants

== Rankings ==
Ranking movements Legend: ██ Increase in ranking ██ Decrease in ranking
	Week																				
Poll	Pre	1	2	3	4	5	6	7	8	9	10	11	12	13	14	15	16	17	18	19	Final
Coaches'		*																			1
Baseball America																					1
Collegiate Baseball^	15	14	20	18	9	15	19	15	14	15	15	14	8	5	8	8	5	3	3	2	1
NCBWA†	13	13	16	14	11	22	23	14	14	13	10	12	9	7	8	8	5	3	3*	3*	1

^ Collegiate Baseball ranked 40 teams in their preseason poll, but only ranked 30 teams weekly during the season.
† NCBWA ranks 30 teams in their preseason poll, but only ranks 25 teams weekly during the season.
* A new poll was not released for this week, so for comparison purposes, the previous week's ranking is inserted in this week's slot.
