= Justin Simmons (baseball) =

American baseball player (born 1981)

- Pitcher
- Born: October 5, 1981 (age 44); Arlington, Texas, U.S.
- Bats: Left Throws: Left
- Stats at Baseball Reference

Justin Simmons (born October 5, 1981) is an American former college and minor league baseball player.

== College career ==
Justin Simmons was a pitcher for the University of Texas from 2001 to 2004. As a freshman in 2001, Simmons went 7–3 with a 3.39 ERA, earning Big 12 Conference Freshman Pitcher of the Year honors.

Simmons had his best college season in 2002, going 16–1 with a 2.53 ERA, earning Big 12 Conference Baseball Pitcher of the Year honors and First-Team All-American honors. Simmons helped Texas to the 2002 College World Series, helping the Longhorns to their fifth College World Series championship. In the College World Series, Simmons went 2–0, allowing just 4 runs in 14 innings, and earning the win in the championship game against the South Carolina Gamecocks.

Though he failed to match the personal accomplishments of his sophomore season, Simmons helped the Longhorns return to the College World Series in 2003 and 2004. In 2003, he played collegiate summer baseball with the Hyannis Mets of the Cape Cod Baseball League.

== Professional career ==
Simmons was drafted by the Chicago Cubs in the 47th round of the 2003 Major League Baseball draft but elected to return to Texas. Simmons was then drafted by the Los Angeles Dodgers in the 2004 Major League Baseball draft.

Simmons would spend his entire professional career in the Dodgers organization, spending time with the Gulf Coast League Dodgers, Vero Beach Dodgers, Jacksonville Suns, and Las Vegas 51s until his retirement after the 2006 season.
