= 2002 NCAA Division I baseball season =

Baseball season

- Number of teams: 286

Tournament
- Duration: May 31–June 22, 2002
- Most conference bids: SEC (7)

College World Series
- Duration: June 14–June 22, 2002
- Champions: Texas (5th title)
- Runners-up: South Carolina (3rd CWS Appearance)
- Winning coach: Augie Garrido (4th title)
- MOP: Huston Street (Texas)

Seasons
- ← 2001 2003 →

The 2002 NCAA Division I baseball season, play of college baseball in the United States organized by the National Collegiate Athletic Association (NCAA) at the Division I level, began in January 2002. The season progressed through the regular season, many conference tournaments and championship series, and concluded with the 2002 NCAA Division I baseball tournament and 2002 College World Series. The College World Series, which consisted of the eight remaining teams in the NCAA tournament, was held in its annual location of Omaha, Nebraska, at Rosenblatt Stadium. It concluded on June 22, 2002, with the final game of the double-elimination bracket. Texas defeated South Carolina 12–6 to win its fifth championship.

== Format changes ==
- The Northeast Conference dissolved its divisions after 3 seasons.

== Conference standings ==
America East Conference
| | Conf | | | Overall | | |
| Team | W | L | Pct | W | L | Pct |
| Maine | 16 | 6 | .727 | 40 | 17 | .702 |
| Vermont | 14 | 8 | .636 | 27 | 22 | .551 |
| Northeastern | 11 | 11 | .500 | 29 | 22 | .569 |
| Stony Brook | 11 | 11 | .500 | 27 | 24 | .529 |
| Binghamton | 8 | 12 | .400 | 17 | 34 | .333 |
| Albany | 8 | 14 | .364 | 20 | 30 | .400 |
| Hartford | 8 | 14 | .364 | 17 | 29 | .370 |

Atlantic Coast Conference
| | Conf | | | Overall | | |
| Team | W | L | Pct | W | L | Pct |
| Florida State | 18 | 6 | .750 | 60 | 14 | .811 |
| Wake Forest | 17 | 6 | .739 | 47 | 13 | .783 |
| North Carolina | 17 | 7 | .708 | 43 | 21 | .672 |
| Clemson | 16 | 8 | .667 | 54 | 17 | .761 |
| Georgia Tech | 14 | 9 | .609 | 52 | 16 | .765 |
| Virginia | 8 | 16 | .333 | 25 | 32 | .439 |
| North Carolina State | 7 | 17 | .292 | 33 | 26 | .559 |
| Maryland | 6 | 18 | .250 | 34 | 23 | .596 |
| Duke | 4 | 20 | .167 | 24 | 34 | .414 |

Atlantic Sun Conference
| | Conf | | | Overall | | |
| Team | W | L | Pct | W | L | Pct |
| Central Florida | 23 | 7 | .767 | 41 | 22 | .651 |
| Florida Atlantic | 22 | 8 | .733 | 46 | 21 | .687 |
| Stetson | 19 | 9 | .679 | 42 | 19 | .689 |
| Troy State | 16 | 14 | .633 | 28 | 30 | .483 |
| Jacksonville | 15 | 15 | .500 | 27 | 31 | .466 |
| Samford | 13 | 17 | .433 | 27 | 31 | .466 |
| Mercer | 13 | 17 | .433 | 22 | 32 | .407 |
| Georgia State | 13 | 17 | .433 | 24 | 32 | .429 |
| Campbell | 11 | 19 | .367 | 22 | 30 | .423 |
| Jacksonville State | 9 | 20 | .310 | 23 | 31 | .426 |
| Belmont | 9 | 20 | .310 | 22 | 30 | .423 |

Atlantic 10 Conference
| | Conf | | | Overall | | |
| Team | W | L | Pct | W | L | Pct |
East
| St. Bonaventure | 16 | 7 | .696 | 30 | 13 | .698 |
| Temple | 11 | 13 | .458 | 22 | 28 | .440 |
| Rhode Island | 10 | 14 | .417 | 24 | 28 | .462 |
| Saint Joseph's | 10 | 14 | .417 | 16 | 36 | .308 |
| Massachusetts | 9 | 15 | .375 | 21 | 26 | .447 |
| Fordham | 6 | 18 | .250 | 13 | 36 | .265 |
West
| Richmond | 22 | 2 | .917 | 53 | 13 | .803 |
| George Washington | 17 | 7 | .708 | 42 | 23 | .646 |
| Xavier | 15 | 8 | .652 | 27 | 27 | .500 |
| Dayton | 14 | 10 | .583 | 32 | 21 | .604 |
| Duquesne | 12 | 12 | .500 | 26 | 23 | .531 |
| La Salle | 1 | 23 | .042 | 10 | 40 | .200 |

Big East Conference
| | Conf | | | Overall | | |
| Team | W | L | Pct | W | L | Pct |
| Notre Dame | 18 | 8 | .692 | 50 | 18 | .735 |
| Virginia Tech | 18 | 8 | .692 | 33 | 26 | .559 |
| Boston College | 15 | 11 | .577 | 30 | 25 | .545 |
| Rutgers | 15 | 11 | .577 | 35 | 22 | .614 |
| Pittsburgh | 14 | 11 | .560 | 36 | 16 | .692 |
| St. John's | 14 | 12 | .538 | 29 | 23 | .558 |
| Connecticut | 13 | 12 | .520 | 28 | 22 | .560 |
| Villanova | 12 | 13 | .480 | 30 | 23 | .566 |
| Seton Hall | 11 | 15 | .423 | 25 | 28 | .472 |
| West Virginia | 9 | 16 | .360 | 24 | 26 | .480 |
| Georgetown | 2 | 24 | .077 | 9 | 47 | .161 |

Big South Conference
| | Conf | | | Overall | | |
| Team | W | L | Pct | W | L | Pct |
| Coastal Carolina | 16 | 5 | .762 | 44 | 19 | .698 |
| Elon | 13 | 8 | .619 | 34 | 23 | .596 |
| Charleston Southern | 12 | 9 | .571 | 25 | 34 | .424 |
| Liberty | 11 | 9 | .550 | 33 | 24 | .579 |
| High Point | 9 | 11 | .450 | 26 | 31 | .456 |
| Winthrop | 8 | 13 | .381 | 29 | 30 | .492 |
| UNC Asheville | 7 | 14 | .333 | 21 | 30 | .412 |
| Radford | 7 | 14 | .333 | 18 | 33 | .353 |

Big Ten Conference
| | Conf | | | Overall | | |
| Team | W | L | Pct | W | L | Pct |
| Minnesota | 18 | 10 | .643 | 32 | 26 | .552 |
| Ohio State | 18 | 11 | .621 | 38 | 20 | .655 |
| Michigan State | 16 | 12 | .571 | 38 | 19 | .667 |
| Indiana | 15 | 14 | .517 | 35 | 20 | .636 |
| Iowa | 15 | 16 | .484 | 26 | 29 | .473 |
| Northwestern | 14 | 15 | .483 | 26 | 29 | .473 |
| Illinois | 14 | 15 | .483 | 32 | 19 | .627 |
| Michigan | 14 | 17 | .452 | 21 | 32 | .396 |
| Purdue | 13 | 19 | .406 | 24 | 32 | .429 |
| Penn State | 11 | 19 | .367 | 23 | 30 | .434 |

Big 12 Conference
| | Conf | | | Overall | | |
| Team | W | L | Pct | W | L | Pct |
| Texas | 19 | 8 | .704 | 57 | 15 | .792 |
| Nebraska | 16 | 11 | .593 | 47 | 21 | .691 |
| Texas Tech | 16 | 11 | .593 | 42 | 20 | .677 |
| Oklahoma | 15 | 12 | .556 | 35 | 27 | .565 |
| Oklahoma State | 13 | 13 | .500 | 37 | 21 | .638 |
| Kansas State | 13 | 13 | .500 | 30 | 25 | .545 |
| Baylor | 13 | 13 | .500 | 36 | 26 | .581 |
| Texas A&M | 13 | 14 | .481 | 35 | 24 | .593 |
| Missouri | 9 | 16 | .360 | 24 | 29 | .453 |
| Kansas | 5 | 21 | .192 | 22 | 29 | .431 |

Big West Conference
| | Conf | | | Overall | | |
| Team | W | L | Pct | W | L | Pct |
| Cal State Northridge | 19 | 5 | .792 | 41 | 17 | .707 |
| Long Beach State | 17 | 7 | .708 | 39 | 21 | .650 |
| Cal Poly | 15 | 9 | .625 | 30 | 29 | .508 |
| Cal State Fullerton | 14 | 10 | .583 | 37 | 22 | .627 |
| UC Irvine | 14 | 10 | .583 | 33 | 26 | .559 |
| UC Riverside | 10 | 14 | .417 | 30 | 28 | .517 |
| UC Santa Barbara | 8 | 16 | .333 | 22 | 33 | .400 |
| Pacific | 7 | 17 | .292 | 26 | 28 | .481 |
| Sacramento State | 4 | 20 | .167 | 22 | 34 | .393 |

Colonial Athletic Association
| | Conf | | | Overall | | |
| Team | W | L | Pct | W | L | Pct |
American
| James Madison | 15 | 5 | .750 | 44 | 16 | .733 |
| UNC Wilmington | 14 | 7 | .667 | 36 | 21 | .632 |
| Towson | 9 | 12 | .429 | 23 | 27 | .460 |
| Old Dominion | 8 | 12 | .400 | 26 | 27 | .491 |
| Drexel | 5 | 16 | .238 | 21 | 34 | .382 |
Colonial
| Delaware | 12 | 7 | .632 | 35 | 22 | .614 |
| George Mason | 12 | 7 | .682 | 28 | 29 | .491 |
| Virginia Commonwealth | 13 | 8 | .619 | 38 | 27 | .585 |
| William & Mary | 12 | 9 | .571 | 32 | 26 | .552 |
| Hofstra | 2 | 19 | .095 | 12 | 40 | .231 |

Conference USA
| | Conf | | | Overall | | |
| Team | W | L | Pct | W | L | Pct |
| Houston | 22 | 7 | .759 | 48 | 17 | .738 |
| Louisville | 21 | 9 | .700 | 38 | 19 | .667 |
| Texas Christian | 19 | 11 | .633 | 30 | 29 | .508 |
| Southern Miss | 18 | 11 | .621 | 36 | 22 | .621 |
| Tulane | 17 | 13 | .567 | 36 | 27 | .571 |
| East Carolina | 16 | 13 | .552 | 43 | 20 | .683 |
| South Florida | 16 | 14 | .533 | 35 | 29 | .547 |
| Saint Louis | 11 | 17 | .393 | 22 | 30 | .423 |
| Cincinnati | 11 | 18 | .379 | 26 | 29 | .473 |
| Memphis | 10 | 20 | .333 | 20 | 31 | .392 |
| Charlotte | 9 | 21 | .300 | 19 | 35 | .352 |
| UAB | 7 | 23 | .233 | 16 | 40 | .286 |

Horizon League
| | Conf | | | Overall | | |
| Team | W | L | Pct | W | L | Pct |
| Illinois–Chicago | 14 | 5 | .737 | 39 | 16 | .709 |
| Wisconsin–Milwaukee | 15 | 8 | .652 | 36 | 20 | .643 |
| Youngstown State | 11 | 8 | .579 | 18 | 26 | .409 |
| Butler | 11 | 11 | .500 | 34 | 23 | .596 |
| Cleveland State | 11 | 12 | .478 | 17 | 35 | .327 |
| Wright State | 9 | 14 | .391 | 20 | 33 | .377 |
| Detroit | 3 | 16 | .158 | 15 | 36 | .294 |

Ivy League
| | Conf | | | | Overall | |
| Team | W | L | Pct | W | L | Pct |
Lou Gehrig
| Princeton | 13 | 7 | .650 | 22 | 23 | .489 |
| Penn | 11 | 9 | .550 | 17 | 22 | .436 |
| Columbia | 10 | 10 | .500 | 22 | 25 | .468 |
| Cornell | 6 | 14 | .300 | 15 | 30 | .333 |
Red Rolfe
| Harvard | 13 | 7 | .650 | 20 | 26 | .435 |
| Brown | 13 | 7 | .650 | 25 | 24 | .510 |
| Dartmouth | 9 | 11 | .450 | 21 | 20 | .512 |
| Yale | 5 | 15 | .250 | 12 | 27 | .308 |

Metro Atlantic Athletic Conference
| | Conf | | | Overall | | |
| Team | W | L | Pct | W | L | Pct |
| Marist | 22 | 5 | .815 | 41 | 14 | .745 |
| Le Moyne | 19 | 7 | .731 | 30 | 18 | .625 |
| Siena | 17 | 9 | .654 | 28 | 29 | .491 |
| Rider | 17 | 10 | .630 | 33 | 22 | .600 |
| Manhattan | 16 | 11 | .593 | 32 | 19 | .627 |
| Fairfield | 12 | 15 | .444 | 20 | 30 | .400 |
| Iona | 10 | 16 | .385 | 20 | 28 | .417 |
| Niagara | 9 | 17 | .346 | 12 | 34 | .261 |
| Saint Peter's | 7 | 18 | .280 | 12 | 30 | .286 |
| Canisius | 3 | 24 | .111 | 4 | 38 | .095 |

Mid-American Conference
| | Conf | | | Overall | | |
| Team | W | L | Pct | W | L | Pct |
East
| Bowling Green | 18 | 7 | .720 | 32 | 22 | .593 |
| Kent State | 18 | 8 | .692 | 37 | 22 | .627 |
| Miami (OH) | 16 | 12 | .571 | 31 | 28 | .525 |
| Ohio | 14 | 13 | .519 | 26 | 25 | .510 |
| Akron | 8 | 19 | .296 | 18 | 33 | .353 |
| Buffalo | 6 | 17 | .261 | 16 | 28 | .364 |
| Marshall | 7 | 20 | .259 | 17 | 35 | .327 |
West
| Eastern Michigan | 19 | 9 | .679 | 30 | 28 | .517 |
| Ball State | 17 | 9 | .654 | 34 | 23 | .596 |
| Central Michigan | 14 | 10 | .583 | 31 | 25 | .554 |
| Western Michigan | 12 | 13 | .480 | 22 | 25 | .468 |
| Northern Illinois | 11 | 14 | .440 | 23 | 32 | .418 |
| Toledo | 9 | 18 | .333 | 18 | 34 | .346 |

Mid-Continent Conference
| | Conf | | | Overall | | |
| Team | W | L | Pct | W | L | Pct |
| Oral Roberts | 16 | 2 | .889 | 48 | 19 | .716 |
| Southern Utah | 11 | 7 | .611 | 18 | 37 | .327 |
| Oakland | 9 | 8 | .529 | 19 | 35 | .352 |
| Valparaiso | 7 | 9 | .438 | 15 | 32 | .319 |
| Western Illinois | 6 | 9 | .400 | 12 | 39 | .235 |
| Chicago State | 0 | 14 | .000 | 5 | 36 | .122 |

Mid-Eastern Athletic Conference
| | Conf | | | Overall | | |
| Team | W | L | Pct | W | L | Pct |
North
| Delaware State | 16 | 1 | .941 | 40 | 19 | .678 |
| Coppin State | 9 | 7 | .563 | 12 | 37 | .245 |
| Howard | 6 | 12 | .333 | 8 | 41 | .163 |
| Maryland–Eastern Shore | 3 | 14 | .176 | 4 | 36 | .100 |
South
| Bethune–Cookman | 16 | 2 | .889 | 39 | 22 | .639 |
| Florida A&M | 10 | 8 | .556 | 27 | 27 | .500 |
| North Carolina A&T | 6 | 11 | .354 | 19 | 39 | .328 |
| Norfolk State | 3 | 14 | .176 | 16 | 34 | .320 |

Missouri Valley Conference
| | Conf | | | Overall | | |
| Team | W | L | Pct | W | L | Pct |
| Wichita State | 23 | 9 | .719 | 47 | 17 | .734 |
| Creighton | 21 | 10 | .677 | 30 | 24 | .556 |
| Southwest Missouri State | 19 | 13 | .594 | 43 | 21 | .672 |
| Southern Illinois | 17 | 15 | .531 | 32 | 24 | .571 |
| Indiana State | 16 | 15 | .516 | 30 | 27 | .526 |
| Northern Iowa | 14 | 18 | .438 | 30 | 25 | .545 |
| Illinois State | 12 | 18 | .400 | 24 | 30 | .444 |
| Evansville | 12 | 20 | .375 | 22 | 33 | .400 |
| Bradley | 8 | 24 | .250 | 18 | 38 | .321 |

Mountain West Conference
| | Conf | | | Overall | | |
| Team | W | L | Pct | W | L | Pct |
| San Diego State | 20 | 10 | .667 | 43 | 23 | .652 |
| Utah | 16 | 14 | .533 | 33 | 26 | .559 |
| BYU | 15 | 14 | .517 | 31 | 31 | .500 |
| Air Force | 14 | 15 | .483 | 27 | 28 | .491 |
| UNLV | 13 | 17 | .433 | 30 | 30 | .500 |
| New Mexico | 11 | 19 | .367 | 22 | 35 | .386 |

Northeast Conference
| | Conf | | | Overall | | |
| Team | W | L | Pct | W | L | Pct |
| Monmouth | 23 | 4 | .852 | 30 | 21 | .588 |
| UMBC | 20 | 7 | .741 | 32 | 24 | .571 |
| Central Connecticut | 18 | 9 | .667 | 34 | 23 | .596 |
| St. Francis (NY) | 17 | 10 | .630 | 22 | 24 | .478 |
| Sacred Heart | 14 | 13 | .519 | 20 | 27 | .426 |
| Mount St. Mary's | 10 | 16 | .385 | 17 | 35 | .327 |
| Quinnipiac | 9 | 18 | .333 | 12 | 30 | .286 |
| Long Island | 8 | 19 | .296 | 11 | 33 | .250 |
| Wagner | 8 | 19 | .296 | 10 | 39 | .204 |
| Fairleigh Dickinson | 7 | 19 | .269 | 9 | 35 | .205 |

Ohio Valley Conference
| | Conf | | | Overall | | |
| Team | W | L | Pct | W | L | Pct |
| Southeast Missouri State | 16 | 5 | .762 | 37 | 20 | .649 |
| Eastern Illinois | 12 | 8 | .600 | 25 | 26 | .490 |
| Austin Peay | 12 | 9 | .571 | 30 | 27 | .526 |
| Murray State | 10 | 11 | .476 | 20 | 33 | .377 |
| Tennessee Tech | 9 | 11 | .450 | 29 | 27 | .518 |
| Morehead State | 9 | 11 | .450 | 29 | 27 | .518 |
| Eastern Kentucky | 9 | 11 | .450 | 15 | 40 | .273 |
| Tennessee–Martin | 4 | 15 | .211 | 18 | 33 | .353 |

Pacific-10 Conference
| | Conf | | | Overall | | |
| Team | W | L | Pct | W | L | Pct |
| USC | 17 | 7 | .708 | 37 | 24 | .606 |
| Stanford | 16 | 8 | .667 | 47 | 18 | .723 |
| Arizona State | 15 | 9 | .625 | 37 | 21 | .638 |
| Washington | 15 | 9 | .625 | 33 | 27 | .550 |
| California | 11 | 13 | .458 | 29 | 27 | .518 |
| Oregon State | 10 | 14 | .417 | 31 | 23 | .574 |
| UCLA | 9 | 15 | .375 | 26 | 35 | .410 |
| Arizona | 9 | 15 | .375 | 31 | 24 | .564 |
| Washington State | 6 | 18 | .250 | 21 | 33 | .389 |

Patriot League
| | Conf | | | Overall | | |
| Team | W | L | Pct | W | L | Pct |
| Navy | 13 | 7 | .650 | 23 | 25 | .479 |
| Lehigh | 13 | 7 | .650 | 29 | 21 | .580 |
| Lafayette | 12 | 8 | .600 | 23 | 22 | .511 |
| Army | 11 | 9 | .550 | 22 | 21 | .515 |
| Bucknell | 6 | 14 | .300 | 15 | 35 | .300 |
| Holy Cross | 5 | 15 | .250 | 11 | 28 | .282 |

Southeastern Conference
| Team | W | L | Pct | W | L | Pct |
East
| South Carolina | 21 | 8 | .724 | 53 | 16 | .768 |
| Florida | 20 | 10 | .667 | 46 | 19 | .708 |
| Georgia | 15 | 15 | .500 | 32 | 29 | .525 |
| Tennessee | 12 | 18 | .400 | 27 | 28 | .491 |
| Vanderbilt | 7 | 21 | .250 | 24 | 27 | .471 |
| Kentucky | 6 | 24 | .200 | 17 | 36 | .321 |
West
| Alabama | 20 | 10 | .667 | 51 | 15 | .773 |
| LSU | 19 | 10 | .655 | 44 | 22 | .667 |
| Auburn | 15 | 15 | .500 | 34 | 26 | .567 |
| Mississippi State | 14 | 15 | .483 | 34 | 24 | .586 |
| Arkansas | 13 | 14 | .481 | 35 | 28 | .556 |
| Ole Miss | 14 | 16 | .467 | 37 | 19 | .661 |

Southern Conference
| | Conf | | | Overall | | |
| Team | W | L | Pct | W | L | Pct |
| The Citadel | 22 | 8 | .733 | 31 | 26 | .544 |
| Western Carolina | 20 | 10 | .667 | 33 | 23 | .589 |
| College of Charleston | 19 | 11 | .633 | 36 | 22 | .621 |
| Georgia Southern | 18 | 11 | .621 | 39 | 25 | .609 |
| UNC Greensboro | 17 | 11 | .607 | 33 | 22 | .600 |
| Furman | 14 | 16 | .467 | 26 | 34 | .433 |
| Wofford | 14 | 16 | .467 | 26 | 31 | .456 |
| East Tennessee State | 13 | 16 | .448 | 23 | 36 | .390 |
| Davidson | 13 | 16 | .448 | 21 | 29 | .420 |
| Appalachian State | 10 | 19 | .345 | 16 | 34 | .320 |
| VMI | 1 | 27 | .036 | 10 | 41 | .196 |

Southland Conference
| | Conf | | | Overall | | |
| Team | W | L | Pct | W | L | Pct |
| Northwestern State | 17 | 10 | .630 | 43 | 17 | .717 |
| Louisiana–Monroe | 17 | 10 | .630 | 29 | 29 | .500 |
| Lamar | 16 | 11 | .593 | 36 | 24 | .600 |
| Texas–Arlington | 15 | 11 | .577 | 29 | 29 | .500 |
| McNeese State | 15 | 12 | .556 | 30 | 28 | .517 |
| Southwest Texas State | 14 | 13 | .519 | 36 | 24 | .600 |
| Texas–San Antonio | 13 | 14 | .481 | 25 | 29 | .463 |
| Nicholls State | 11 | 15 | .423 | 28 | 26 | .519 |
| Sam Houston State | 9 | 18 | .333 | 21 | 33 | .389 |
| Southeastern Louisiana | 7 | 20 | .259 | 21 | 33 | .389 |

Southwestern Athletic Conference
| | Conf | | | Overall | | |
| Team | W | L | Pct | W | L | Pct |
East
| Alcorn State | 18 | 14 | .563 | 24 | 22 | .522 |
| Jackson State | 15 | 13 | .536 | 23 | 29 | .442 |
| Alabama State | 17 | 15 | .531 | 23 | 27 | .460 |
| Alabama A&M | 13 | 16 | .448 | 17 | 26 | .395 |
| Mississippi Valley State | 10 | 15 | .400 | 10 | 42 | .192 |
West
| Southern | 29 | 3 | .906 | 45 | 10 | .818 |
| Texas Southern | 20 | 12 | .625 | 24 | 28 | .462 |
| Grambling State | 14 | 18 | .438 | 24 | 26 | .480 |
| Arkansas Pine–Bluff | 14 | 18 | .438 | 25 | 28 | .472 |
| Prairie View A&M | 3 | 29 | .094 | 3 | 46 | .061 |

Sun Belt Conference
| | Conf | | | Overall | | |
| Team | W | L | Pct | W | L | Pct |
| South Alabama | 17 | 5 | .773 | 42 | 19 | .689 |
| Louisiana–Lafayette | 17 | 7 | .708 | 39 | 23 | .629 |
| Western Kentucky | 14 | 9 | .609 | 38 | 20 | .655 |
| Florida International | 13 | 11 | .542 | 41 | 20 | .672 |
| New Orleans | 12 | 12 | .500 | 31 | 28 | .525 |
| New Mexico State | 10 | 14 | .417 | 37 | 25 | .597 |
| Arkansas State | 9 | 14 | .391 | 23 | 35 | .397 |
| Middle Tennessee | 8 | 16 | .333 | 26 | 30 | .464 |
| Arkansas–Little Rock | 5 | 17 | .227 | 19 | 35 | .352 |

West Coast Conference
| | Conf | | | Overall | | |
| Team | W | L | Pct | W | L | Pct |
Coast
| Pepperdine | 18 | 12 | .600 | 31 | 32 | .492 |
| Santa Clara | 15 | 14 | .517 | 25 | 30 | .455 |
| Saint Mary's | 14 | 15 | .483 | 22 | 27 | .449 |
| Gonzaga | 14 | 16 | .467 | 27 | 29 | .482 |
West
| San Diego | 18 | 12 | .600 | 39 | 23 | .629 |
| Portland | 16 | 14 | .533 | 24 | 30 | .444 |
| Loyola Marymount | 15 | 15 | .500 | 22 | 34 | .393 |
| San Francisco | 9 | 21 | .300 | 18 | 38 | .321 |

Western Athletic Conference
| | Conf | | | Overall | | |
| Team | W | L | Pct | W | L | Pct |
| Rice | 28 | 2 | .933 | 52 | 14 | .788 |
| San Jose State | 21 | 9 | .700 | 45 | 17 | .726 |
| Fresno State | 19 | 11 | .667 | 32 | 27 | .542 |
| Nevada | 10 | 20 | .333 | 25 | 32 | .439 |
| Louisiana Tech | 7 | 23 | .233 | 21 | 37 | .362 |
| Hawaii | 5 | 25 | .167 | 16 | 40 | .286 |

Division I Independents
| Team | W | L | Pct |
| Miami (FL) | 34 | 29 | .540 |
| Birmingham–Southern | 32 | 20 | .615 |
| NYIT | 27 | 25 | .519 |
| Lipscomb | 24 | 24 | .500 |
| Texas A&M–Corpus Christi | 24 | 29 | .453 |
| Morris Brown | 15 | 35 | .300 |
| Texas–Pan American | 15 | 38 | .283 |
| Pace | 14 | 36 | .280 |
| C.W. Post | 11 | 30 | .268 |
| Centenary | 15 | 41 | .268 |
| Hawaii–Hilo | 10 | 38 | .208 |

Team won the conference tournament and the automatic bid to the NCAA tournament
Conference does not have conference tournament, so team won the autobid for finishing in first
Team received at-large bid to NCAA tournament

== College World Series ==
The 2002 season marked the fifty sixth NCAA baseball tournament, which culminated with the eight team College World Series. The College World Series was held in Omaha, Nebraska. The eight teams played a double-elimination format, with Texas claiming their fifth championship with a 12–6 win over South Carolina in the final.

=== Bracket ===
First round
Notre Dame | 3
8 | Stanford | 4
5 | Texas | 2
4 | Rice | 1
Notre Dame | 5
4 | Rice | 3
2 | Clemson | 11
Nebraska | 10
6 | South Carolina | 0
Georgia Tech | 11
Nebraska | 8
6 | South Carolina | 10

Second round
8 | Stanford | 7
5 | Texas | 8
Notre Dame | 3
8 | Stanford | 5
2 | Clemson | 9
Georgia Tech | 7
6 | South Carolina | 9
Georgia Tech | 5

Semifinals
5 | Texas | 6 | —
8 | Stanford | 5 | —
2 | Clemson | 4 | 2
6 | South Carolina | 12 | 10

Finals
5 | Texas | 12
6 | South Carolina | 6
