= 2002 Stanford Cardinal baseball team =

American college baseball season

2002 Stanford Cardinal baseball

Palo Alto Regional champions Palo Alto Super Regional champions

College World Series, 4th
- Conference: Pacific 10 Conference

Ranking
- Coaches: No. 4
- CB: No. 4
- Record: 47–18 (16–8 Pac-10)
- Head coach: Mark Marquess (26th season)
- Assistant coach: Dave Nakama (1st season)
- Hitting coach: Dean Stotz (26th season)
- Pitching coach: Tom Kunis (3rd season)
- Home stadium: Sunken Diamond

2002 Pacific-10 Conference baseball standings
	Conf.						Overall
Team	W		L		T	PCT	W		L		T	PCT
No. 12 Southern California ‍†‍‍^{y}	17	–	7	–	0	.708	37	–	24	–	0	.607
No. 4 Stanford ‍‍‍^{y}	16	–	8	–	0	.667	47	–	18	–	0	.723
No. 26 Arizona State ‍‍‍^{y}	15	–	6	–	0	.714	37	–	27	–	0	.578
Washington ‍‍‍^{y}	15	–	9	–	0	.625	33	–	27	–	1	.549
California ‍‍‍	11	–	13	–	0	.458	29	–	27	–	0	.518
Oregon State ‍‍‍	10	–	14	–	0	.417	31	–	23	–	0	.574
UCLA ‍‍‍	9	–	15	–	0	.375	26	–	35	–	0	.426
Arizona ‍‍‍	9	–	15	–	0	.375	31	–	24	–	0	.564
Washington State ‍‍‍	6	–	18	–	0	.250	21	–	33	–	0	.389
† – Conference champion y – Invited to the NCAA tournament As of June 30, 2002; Rankings from Collegiate Baseball

The 2002 Stanford Cardinal baseball team represented Stanford University in the 2002 NCAA Division I baseball season. The Cardinal played their home games at Sunken Diamond. The team was coached by Mark Marquess in his 26th year at Stanford.

The Cardinal won the Palo Alto Regional and the Palo Alto Super Regional to advance to the College World Series, where they were defeated by the Texas Longhorns.

== Roster ==
2002 Stanford Cardinal baseball team
Players
Coaches

#	Pos.	Name	B/T	Height	Weight	Year	Home town
1	INF	Chris O'Riordan	R/R	5 ft 8 in (1.73 m)	175 lb (79 kg)	Sr	San Diego, California
2	INF	Arik VanZandt	/	6 ft 1 in (1.85 m)	200 lb (91 kg)	Sr	Bellevue, Washington
3		Brian Hall	/	6 ft 0 in (1.83 m)	75 lb (34 kg)	So	Carlsbad, New Mexico
4	INF	Jonny Ash	/	5 ft 8 in (1.73 m)	175 lb (79 kg)	So	Oakland, California
5	OF	Sam Fuld	L/L	5 ft 10 in (1.78 m)	180 lb (82 kg)	So	Durham, New Hampshire
6	INF	Tobin Swope	/	5 ft 11 in (1.8 m)	185 lb (84 kg)	Sr	Dallas, Texas
7	OF	Danny Putnam	L/L	5 ft 10 in (1.78 m)	185 lb (84 kg)	Fr	Escondido, California
8	INF	Scott Dragicevich	R/R	6 ft 3 in (1.91 m)	205 lb (93 kg)	Sr	Westlake Village, California
11		Chris Carter	L/L	6 ft 0 in (1.83 m)	205 lb (93 kg)	Fr	Concord, California
12	C	Ryan Garko	R/R	6 ft 2 in (1.88 m)	235 lb (107 kg)	Sr	Walnut, California
13		Andrew Cleary	/	6 ft 1 in (1.85 m)	200 lb (91 kg)	RS Sr	Weston, Massachusetts
14		Billy Paganetti	/	6 ft 4 in (1.93 m)	215 lb (98 kg)	Fr	Reno, Nevada
15	C	Donny Lucy	R/R	6 ft 3 in (1.91 m)	205 lb (93 kg)	Fr	Fallbrook, California
17	RHP	John Hudgins	R/R	6 ft 2 in (1.88 m)	195 lb (88 kg)	So	Mission Viejo, California
18	OF	Jason Cooper	/	6 ft 2 in (1.88 m)	210 lb (95 kg)	Jr	Moses Lake, Washington
19		David O'Hagan	/R	6 ft 0 in (1.83 m)	185 lb (84 kg)	So	Wayzata, Minnesota
20	RHP	Ryan McCally	R/R	6 ft 1 in (1.85 m)	190 lb (86 kg)	Jr	Phoenix, Arizona
21	INF	Andy Topham	R/R	6 ft 2 in (1.88 m)	190 lb (86 kg)	Sr	Sacramento, California
23	OF	Michael Jordan Craven	/	6 ft 2 in (1.88 m)	230 lb (104 kg)	Fr	La Quinta, California
24	OF	Carlos Quentin	R/R	6 ft 2 in (1.88 m)	215 lb (98 kg)	So	Chula Vista, California
25	LHP	Dan Rich	/L	6 ft 2 in (1.88 m)	235 lb (107 kg)	Sr	Bay Village, Ohio
26		Darin Nattjes	/	6 ft 7 in (2.01 m)	240 lb (109 kg)	Jr	Alvord, Iowa
27	LHP	Tim Cunningham	/L	6 ft 3 in (1.91 m)	190 lb (86 kg)	Jr	Rocklin, California
28	RHP	Jeremy Guthrie	R/R	6 ft 1 in (1.85 m)	200 lb (91 kg)	RS Jr	Ashland, Oregon
29	RHP	J. D. Willcox	/R	6 ft 2 in (1.88 m)	190 lb (86 kg)	Sr	Vienna, Virginia
30	RHP	Mark Jecmen	/R	6 ft 9 in (2.06 m)	230 lb (104 kg)	Fr	Diamond Bar, California
33	RHP	Jonny Dyer	/R	6 ft 1 in (1.85 m)	180 lb (82 kg)	RS Sr	San Antonio, Texas
38	RHP	Drew Ehrlich	/R	6 ft 5 in (1.96 m)	230 lb (104 kg)	So	Merced, California
39	RHP	Steve Papazian	R/R	6 ft 6 in (1.98 m)	210 lb (95 kg)	Fr	Long Beach, California
40	RHP	Moses Kopmar	R/R	6 ft 3 in (1.91 m)	200 lb (91 kg)	Fr	Berkeley, California

Head coach

Mark Marquess

Assistant coach(es)

Hitting coach(es)

Dean Stotz

Base coach(es)

Dave Nakama

Pitching coach(es)

Tom Kunis

Legend

- (C) Team captain
- (S) Suspended
- (I) Ineligible
- Injured
- Current redshirt

Roster
Last update: January 21, 2021

== Schedule ==
2002 Stanford Cardinal baseball game log
Regular season
February (9–4)

#	Date	Opponent	Site/stadium	Score	Overall record	Pac-10 record
1	February 1	Cal State Fullerton	Sunken Diamond • Stanford, California	7–4	1–0	–
2	February 2	Cal State Fullerton	Sunken Diamond • Stanford, California	17–1	2–0	–
3	February 3	Cal State Fullerton	Sunken Diamond • Stanford, California	13–7	2–1	–
4	February 8	at Florida State	Dick Howser Stadium • Tallahassee, Florida	9–3	3–1	–
5	February 9	at Florida State	Dick Howser Stadium• Tallahassee, Florida	15–11	4–1	–
6	February 10	at Florida State	Dick Howser Stadium • Tallahassee, Florida	6–7	4–2	–
7	February 12	BYU	Sunken Diamond • Stanford, California	8–1	5–2	–
8	February 15	at Fresno State	Pete Beiden Field at Bob Bennett Stadium • Fresno, California	6–2	6–2	–
9	February 16	at Fresno State	Pete Beiden Field at Bob Bennett Stadiumd • Fresno, California	5–7	6–3	–
10	February 19	at Fresno State	Pete Beiden Field at Bob Bennett Stadium • Fresno, California	8–3	7–3	–
11	February 22	Santa Clara	Stephen Schott Stadium • Santa Clara, California	5–4	8–3	–
12	February 23	at Santa Clara	Stephen Schott Stadium • Santa Clara, California	9–13	8–4	–
13	February 24	Santa Clara	Sunken Diamond • Stanford, California	8–7	9–4	–

March (10–2)

#	Date	Opponent	Site/stadium	Score	Overall record	Pac-10 record
14	March 1	Cal Poly	Sunken Diamond • Stanford, California	8–6	10–4	–
15	March 2	Cal Poly	Sunken Diamond • Stanford, California	18–5	11–4	–
16	March 3	Cal Poly	Sunken Diamond • Stanford, California	11–3	12–4	–
17	March 8	at California	Evans Diamond • Berkeley, California	15–4	13–4	–
18	March 9	at California	Evans Diamond • Berkeley, California	1–2	13–5	–
19	March 10	at California	Evans Diamond • Berkeley, California	4–2	14–5	–
20	March 23	at Southern California	Dedeaux Field • Los Angeles, California	9–6	15–5	–
21	March 23	at Southern California	Dedeaux Field • Los Angeles, California	12–10	16–5	–
22	March 24	at Southern California	Dedeaux Field • Los Angeles, California	5–4	17–5	–
23	March 28	Texas	Sunken Diamond • Stanford, California	7–6	18–5	–
24	March 29	Texas	Sunken Diamond • Stanford, California	0–2	18–6	–
25	March 30	Texas	Sunken Diamond • Stanford, California	7–2	19–6	–

April (10–6)

#	Date	Opponent	Site/stadium	Score	Overall record	Pac-10 record
26	April 2	San Francisco	Sunken Diamond • Stanford, California	4–1	20–6	–
27	April 5	at Arizona	Jerry Kindall Field at Frank Sancet Stadium • Tucson, Arizona	5–4	21–6	1–0
28	April 6	at Arizona	Jerry Kindall Field at Frank Sancet Stadium • Tucson, Arizona	19–1	22–6	2–0
29	April 7	at Arizona	Jerry Kindall Field at Frank Sancet Stadium • Tucson, Arizona	13–15	22–7	3–0
30	April 9	San Jose State	Sunken Diamond • Stanford, California	5–4	23–7	3–0
31	April 12	Southern California	Sunken Diamond • Stanford, California	6–5	24–7	4–0
32	April 13	Southern California	Sunken Diamond • Stanford, California	11–16	24–8	4–1
33	April 14	Southern California	Sunken Diamond • Stanford, California	15–4	25–8	5–1
34	April 16	Saint Mary's	Sunken Diamond • Stanford, California	19–2	26–8	5–1
35	April 19	at Washington	Husky Ballpark • Seattle, Washington	1–3	26–9	5–2
36	April 20	at Washington	Husky Ballpark • Seattle, Washington	9–4	27–9	6–2
37	April 21	at Washington	Husky Ballpark • Seattle, Washington	3–4	27–10	6–3
38	April 24	Sacramento State	Sunken Diamond • Stanford, California	6–5	28–10	7–3
39	April 26	Oregon State	Goss Stadium at Coleman Field • Corvallis, Oregon	1–3	28–11	7–4
40	April 27	Oregon State	Goss Stadium at Coleman Field • Corvallis, Oregon	3–4	28–12	7–5
41	April 28	Oregon State	Goss Stadium at Coleman Field • Corvallis, Oregon	13–0	29–12	8–5

May (11–4)

#	Date	Opponent	Site/stadium	Score	Overall record	Pac-10 record
42	May 1	at San Jose State	San Jose Municipal Stadium • San Jose, California	0–12	29–13	8–5
43	May 3	California	Sunken Diamond • Stanford, California	8–4	30–13	9–5
44	May 4	California	Sunken Diamond • Stanford, California	13–6	31–13	10–5
45	May 5	California	Sunken Diamond • Stanford, California	8–5	32–13	11–5
46	May 7	at Santa Clara	Stephen Schott Stadium • Santa Clara, California	13–2	33–13	11–5
47	May 10	Arizona State	Sunken Diamond • Stanford, California	13–2	34–13	12–5
48	May 11	Arizona State	Sunken Diamond • Stanford, California	2–10	34–14	12–6
49	May 12	Arizona State	Sunken Diamond • Stanford, California	3–1	35–14	13–6
50	May 14	at Nevada	William Peccole Park • Reno, Nevada	12–13	35–15	13–6
51	May 17	at UCLA	Jackie Robinson Stadium • Los Angeles, California	11–0	36–15	14–6
52	May 18	at UCLA	Jackie Robinson Stadium • Los Angeles, California	4–9	36–16	14–7
53	May 19	at UCLA	Jackie Robinson Stadium • Los Angeles, California	17–4	37–16	15–7
54	May 24	Washington State	Sunken Diamond • Stanford, California	10–0	38–16	16–7
55	May 25	Washington State	Sunken Diamond • Stanford, California	11–3	39–16	17–7
56	May 26	Washington State	Sunken Diamond • Stanford, California	8–2	40–16	18–7

Postseason
NCAA Palo Alto Regional (3–0)

#	Date	Opponent	Site/stadium	Score	Overall record	Pac-10 record
57	May 31	Cal State Fullerton	Sunken Diamond • Stanford, California	3–2	41–16	18–7
58	June 1	Long Beach State	Sunken Diamond • Stanford, California	5–4	42–16	18–7
59	June 2	Long Beach State	Sunken Diamond • Stanford, California	8–4	43–16	18–7

NCAA Palo Alto Super Regional (2–0)

#	Date	Opponent	Site/stadium	Score	Overall record	Pac-10 record
60	June 7	Southern California	Sunken Diamond • Stanford, California	4–2	44–16	18–7
61	June 8	Southern California	Sunken Diamond • Stanford, California	5–3	45–16	18–7

College World Series (2–2)

#	Date	Opponent	Site/stadium	Score	Overall record	Pac-10 record
62	June 15	vs Notre Dame	Johnny Rosenblatt Stadium • Omaha, Nebraska	4–3	46–16	18–7
63	June 17	vs Texas	Johnny Rosenblatt Stadium • Omaha, Nebraska	7–8	46–17	18–7
64	June 18	vs Notre Dame	Johnny Rosenblatt Stadium • Omaha, Nebraska	5–3	47–17	18–7
65	June 20	vs Texas	Johnny Rosenblatt Stadium • Omaha, Nebraska	5–6	47–18	18–7

== Awards and honors ==
Jason Cooper

- All-Pac-10 Conference

Sam Fuld

- All-Pac-10 Conference
- First Team All-American Baseball America
- Third Team All-American Collegiate Baseball
- Third Team All-American National Collegiate Baseball Writers Association
- College World Series All-Tournament Team

Ryan Garko

- All-Pac-10 Conference

Jeremy Guthrie

- Pac-10 Conference Pitcher of the Year
- Honorable Mention All-Pac-10 Conference
- First Team All-American Baseball America
- First Team All-American Collegiate Baseball
- Second Team All-American National Collegiate Baseball Writers Association

Chris O'Riordan

- All-Pac-10 Conference

Carlos Quentin

- All-Pac-10 Conference
- Third Team All-American National Collegiate Baseball Writers Association
