= Dustin Majewski =

American baseball player (born 1981)

- Outfielder
- Born: August 16, 1981 (age 44); Brenham, Texas, U.S.
- Bats: Left Throws: Left
- Stats at Baseball Reference

Dustin Majewski (born August 16, 1981) is an American former college and professional baseball outfielder.

== College career ==
After earning 1999 Class 4A Player of the Year honors and leading Brenham High School to the Texas state championship finals, Majewski enrolled at Blinn College, where he twice earned All-Conference and All-Region honors in 2000 and 2001.

Majewski transferred to the University of Texas prior to the 2002 season. As a member of the 2002 Texas Longhorns baseball team, Majewski earned Third-Team All-American honors and 2002 College World Series All-Tournament Team honors while helping Texas to its fifth College World Series championship. Majewski was drafted by the Boston Red Sox in the 12th round of the 2002 Major League Baseball draft but elected to return to Texas.

In 2003, Majewski earned First-Team 2003 College Baseball All-America Team All-American honors from the American Baseball Coaches Association, Baseball America and the National Collegiate Baseball Writers Association. As defending national champions, Majewski and Texas returned to the 2003 College World Series, where they were eliminated by eventual national champion Rice.

== Professional career ==
Majewski was drafted by the Oakland Athletics in the third round, with the 92nd overall selection, of the 2003 Major League Baseball draft.

In 2004, as a member of the Kane County Cougars, Majewski was named a starter in the 2004 Midwest League All-Star Game. In 2005, Majewski was traded to the Toronto Blue Jays in exchange for Chad Gaudin. Majewski would go on to make the Florida State League All-Star Game in 2006 as a member of the Dunedin Blue Jays. Later that season, after being promoted to the New Hampshire Fisher Cats, Majewski set a club record by hitting a home run in four consecutive games. Majewski would ultimately go on to spend his last two seasons in the Texas Rangers organization, with the Frisco RoughRiders and Oklahoma City RedHawks, before retiring after the 2009 season.

== See also ==
- Rule 5 draft results
