= 2002 Nebraska Cornhuskers baseball team =

American college baseball season

2002 Nebraska Cornhuskers baseball

2002 College World Series, T-7th
- Conference: Big 12 Conference

Ranking
- Coaches: No. 8
- CB: No. 8
- Record: 47–21 (16–11 Big 12)
- Head coach: Dave Van Horn (5th season)
- Assistant coach: Kevin Koch
- Hitting coach: Mike Anderson (8th season)
- Pitching coach: Rob Childress (5th season)
- Home stadium: Haymarket Park

2002 Big 12 Conference baseball standings
	Conf.				Overall
Team	W		L	PCT	W		L	PCT
No. 1 Texas ‍†‍‡‍^{y}	19	–	8	.704	57	–	15	.792
No. 8 Nebraska ‍‍‍^{y}	16	–	11	.593	47	–	21	.691
No. 24 Texas Tech ‍‍‍^{y}	16	–	11	.593	42	–	20	.677
Oklahoma ‍‍‍^{y}	15	–	12	.556	35	–	27	.565
Oklahoma State ‍‍‍	13	–	13	.500	37	–	21	.638
Kansas State ‍‍‍	13	–	13	.500	30	–	25	.545
Baylor ‍‍‍^{y}	13	–	13	.500	36	–	26	.581
Texas A&M ‍‍‍	13	–	14	.481	35	–	24	.593
Missouri ‍‍‍	9	–	16	.360	24	–	29	.453
Kansas ‍‍‍	5	–	21	.192	22	–	29	.431
† – Conference champion ‡ – Tournament champion y – Invited to the NCAA tournament As of June 30, 2002; Rankings from Collegiate Baseball

The 2002 Nebraska Cornhuskers baseball team represented the University of Nebraska–Lincoln in the 2002 NCAA Division I baseball season. The head coach was Dave Van Horn, serving his 5th year.

The Cornhuskers lost in the College World Series, defeated by the South Carolina Gamecocks.

== Roster ==
2002 Nebraska Cornhuskers baseball team
Players
Coaches

#	Pos.	Name	B/T	Height	Weight	Year	Home town
1	OF	Jeff Leise	L/L	5 ft 9 in (1.75 m)	165 lb (75 kg)	Jr	Omaha, Nebraska
3	C	Jed Morris	L/R	6 ft 0 in (1.83 m)	190 lb (86 kg)	Jr	Seabrook, Texas
4	C	Chad Steele	L/R	5 ft 10 in (1.78 m)	190 lb (86 kg)	Fr	Omaha, Nebraska
6	INF	Josh Birmingham	R/R	6 ft 2 in (1.88 m)	185 lb (84 kg)	Jr	Hobbs, New Mexico
7	INF	Will Bolt	R/R	5 ft 9 in (1.75 m)	175 lb (79 kg)	Sr	Conroe, Texas
8	INF	Jeff Blevins	S/R	5 ft 11 in (1.8 m)	175 lb (79 kg)	Sr	Sand Springs, Oklahoma
9	INF	Joe Simokaitis	R/R	6 ft 2 in (1.88 m)	185 lb (84 kg)	Fr	St. Louis, Missouri
10	OF	Justin Seely	L/L	5 ft 10 in (1.78 m)	180 lb (82 kg)	Sr	Nacogdoches, Texas
11	OF	Drew Anderson	R/R	6 ft 2 in (1.88 m)	195 lb (88 kg)	So	Kearney, Nebraska
12	OF	Daniel Bruce	R/R	6 ft 0 in (1.83 m)	190 lb (86 kg)	Fr	Omaha, Nebraska
14	INF	Brandon Eymann	L/R	6 ft 0 in (1.83 m)	190 lb (86 kg)	Sr	Papillion, Nebraska
15	INF	Curtis Ledbetter	R/R	6 ft 3 in (1.91 m)	220 lb (100 kg)	So	Lawrence, Kansas
16	INF	Matt Hopper	R/R	6 ft 4 in (1.93 m)	210 lb (95 kg)	Jr	Golden, Colorado
17	INF	Chase Odenreider	R/R	6 ft 3 in (1.91 m)	220 lb (100 kg)	Fr	Omaha, Nebraska
18	LHP	Brian Duensing	L/L	6 ft 0 in (1.83 m)	180 lb (82 kg)	Fr	Omaha, Nebraska
19	LHP	Waylon Byers	L/L	6 ft 1 in (1.85 m)	180 lb (82 kg)	Jr	Milo, Iowa
20	RHP	Steve Hale	R/R	5 ft 11 in (1.8 m)	195 lb (88 kg)	Jr	Yukon, Oklahoma
21	C	John Grose	R/R	5 ft 11 in (1.8 m)	190 lb (86 kg)	So	Henderson, Nevada
22	OF	Adam Riddle	R/R	6 ft 1 in (1.85 m)	200 lb (91 kg)	Jr	Abilene, Texas
23	OF	Marcellus Dawson	R/R	6 ft 3 in (1.91 m)	190 lb (86 kg)	Jr	Milwaukee, Wisconsin
24	C	Darren Hoffart	R/R	6 ft 2 in (1.88 m)	200 lb (91 kg)	Fr	Omaha, Nebraska
26	OF	Rob Horst	R/R	6 ft 2 in (1.88 m)	215 lb (98 kg)	Jr	Gering, Nebraska
28	RHP	Shane Komine	R/R	5 ft 9 in (1.75 m)	165 lb (75 kg)	Sr	Honolulu, Hawaii
30	RHP	Derrick Conte	R/R	6 ft 1 in (1.85 m)	200 lb (91 kg)	RS So	Oklahoma City, Oklahoma
31	LHP	Tag Horner	L/L	6 ft 3 in (1.91 m)	195 lb (88 kg)	Fr	Duncan, Oklahoma
32	RHP	Jason Burch	R/R	6 ft 5 in (1.96 m)	220 lb (100 kg)	So	Papillion, Nebraska
33	LHP	Jamie Rodrigue	R/L	6 ft 0 in (1.83 m)	200 lb (91 kg)	Jr	St. Clair, Missouri
34	LHP	Ryan Bonesio	L/L	6 ft 2 in (1.88 m)	195 lb (88 kg)	Jr	Carrollton, Texas
35	RHP	Phil Shirek	R/R	6 ft 3 in (1.91 m)	210 lb (95 kg)	Fr	Minot, North Dakota
36	LHP	Aaron Marsden	L/L	6 ft 6 in (1.98 m)	220 lb (100 kg)	So	Grand Forks, North Dakota
38	RHP	Dustin Timm	R/R	6 ft 3 in (1.91 m)	180 lb (82 kg)	So	Yutan, Nebraska
39	LHP	Justin Pekarek	R/L	6 ft 3 in (1.91 m)	190 lb (86 kg)	RS So	Staplehurst, Nebraska
40	RHP	Jeff Blaesing	R/R	6 ft 2 in (1.88 m)	220 lb (100 kg)	Sr	Lockport, Illinois
41	LHP	Matt McMurtry	L/L	5 ft 11 in (1.8 m)	160 lb (73 kg)	Fr	North Platte, Nebraska
42	LHP	Jeremy Becker	L/L	5 ft 11 in (1.8 m)	195 lb (88 kg)	RS Fr	Scottsbluff, Nebraska
42	C	David Ferazza	R/R	6 ft 3 in (1.91 m)	200 lb (91 kg)	Fr	Hayward, California
44	RHP	Mike Sillman	R/R	6 ft 1 in (1.85 m)	180 lb (82 kg)	So	Omaha, Nebraska
45	RHP	Casey Jorgensen	R/R	6 ft 2 in (1.88 m)	200 lb (91 kg)	Fr	Sioux Falls, South Dakota
49	RHP	J. D. Scholten	R/R	6 ft 6 in (1.98 m)	225 lb (102 kg)	Sr	Sioux City, Iowa
53	RHP	Jeff Bieker	R/R	6 ft 4 in (1.93 m)	180 lb (82 kg)	Fr	Hays, Kansas

Head coach

Dave Van Horn

Assistant coach(es)

Kevin Koch

Hitting coach(es)

Mike Anderson

Pitching coach(es)

Rob Childress

Legend

- (C) Team captain
- (S) Suspended
- (I) Ineligible
- Injured
- Current redshirt

== Schedule ==
2002 Nebraska Cornhuskers baseball game log (47–21)
Regular season (39–17)
February (4–3)

#	Date	Opponent	Rank	Site/stadium	Score	Overall record	Big 12 record
1	February 13	vs. New Mexico	No. 11	Reckling Park • Houston, Texas	W 3–2	1–0	—
2	February 14	at No. 10 Rice	No. 11	Reckling Park • Houston, Texas	L 7–8	1–1	—
3	February 15	vs. No. 15 Wake Forest	No. 11	Reckling Park • Houston, Texas	L 8–9	1–2	—
4	February 22	at McNeese State	No. 13	Joe Miller Ballpark • Lake Charles, Louisiana	W 9–4	2–2	—
5	February 23	vs. Louisiana–Monroe	No. 13	Joe Miller Ballpark • Lake Charles, Louisiana	W 4–1	3–2	—
6	February 24	vs. Southern Miss	No. 13	Joe Miller Ballpark • Lake Charles, Louisiana	L 5–6	3–3	—
7	February 28	at Fresno State	No. 19	Pete Beiden Field at Bob Bennett Stadium • Fresno, California	W 7–1	4–3	—

March (13–6)

#	Date	Opponent	Rank	Site/stadium	Score	Overall record	Big 12 record
8	March 1	at Fresno State	No. 19	Pete Beiden Field at Bob Bennett Stadium • Fresno, California	W 9–0	5–3	—
9	March 2	at Fresno State	No. 19	Pete Beiden Field at Bob Bennett Stadium • Fresno, California	W 10–6	6–3	—
10	March 5	Nebraska–Kearney	No. 17	Haymarket Park • Lincoln, Nebraska	W 23–1	7–3	—
11	March 8	at No. 14 Baylor	No. 17	Baylor Ballpark • Waco, Texas	W 15–4	8–3	1–0
12	March 9	at No. 14 Baylor	No. 17	Baylor Ballpark • Waco, Texas	L 1–2	8–4	1–1
13	March 10	at No. 14 Baylor	No. 17	Baylor Ballpark • Waco, Texas	L 6–9	8–5	1–2
14	March 15	No. 13 Texas A&M	No. 21	Haymarket Park • Lincoln, Nebraska	W 6–4	9–5	2–2
15	March 16	No. 13 Texas A&M	No. 21	Haymarket Park • Lincoln, Nebraska	W 3–0	10–5	3–2
16	March 17	No. 13 Texas A&M	No. 21	Haymarket Park • Lincoln, Nebraska	W 10–0	11–5	4–2
17	March 19	at Minnesota	No. 13	Hubert H. Humphrey Metrodome • Minneapolis, Minnesota	W 19–6	12–5	—
18	March 20	at Minnesota	No. 13	Hubert H. Humphrey Metrodome • Minneapolis, Minnesota	L 3–5	12–6	—
19	March 22	No. 22 Texas Tech	No. 13	Haymarket Park • Lincoln, Nebraska	W 3–1	13–6	5–2
20	March 23	No. 22 Texas Tech	No. 13	Haymarket Park • Lincoln, Nebraska	W 8–3	14–6	6–2
21	March 24	No. 22 Texas Tech	No. 13	Haymarket Park • Lincoln, Nebraska	L 3–4	14–7	6–3
22	March 26	Western Illinois	No. 10	Haymarket Park • Lincoln, Nebraska	W 10–2	15–7	—
23	March 27	Western Illinois	No. 10	Haymarket Park • Lincoln, Nebraska	W 12–5	16–7	—
24	March 29	at Kansas State	No. 10	KSU Baseball Stadium • Manhattan, Kansas	L 8–9	16–8	6–4
25	March 30	at Kansas State	No. 10	KSU Baseball Stadium • Manhattan, Kansas	W 22–6	17–8	7–4
26	March 31	at Kansas State	No. 10	KSU Baseball Stadium • Manhattan, Kansas	L 2–3	17–9	7–5

April (13–7)

#	Date	Opponent	Rank	Site/stadium	Score	Overall record	Big 12 record
27	April 2	Milwaukee	No. 13	Haymarket Park • Lincoln, Nebraska	W 10–1	18–9	—
28	April 3	Milwaukee	No. 13	Haymarket Park • Lincoln, Nebraska	W 16–1	19–9	—
29	April 5	No. 17 Oklahoma	No. 13	Haymarket Park • Lincoln, Nebraska	L 4–5	19–10	7–6
30	April 6	at No. 17 Oklahoma	No. 13	Haymarket Park • Lincoln, Nebraska	W 7–6	20–10	8–6
31	April 7	at No. 17 Oklahoma	No. 13	Haymarket Park • Lincoln, Nebraska	W 12–2	21–10	9–6
32	April 9	at Creighton	No. 10	Creighton Sports Complex • Omaha, Nebraska	L 3–8	21–11	—
33	April 10	Minnesota	No. 10	Haymarket Park • Lincoln, Nebraska	W 12–3	22–11	—
34	April 12	at Missouri	No. 10	Taylor Stadium • Columbia, Missouri	L 6–9	22–12	9–7
35	April 13	at Missouri	No. 10	Taylor Stadium • Columbia, Missouri	W 6–3	23–12	10–7
36	April 14	at Missouri	No. 10	Taylor Stadium • Columbia, Missouri	L 12–16	23–13	10–8
37	April 16	Creighton	No. 20	Haymarket • Lincoln, Nebraska	W 6–5	24–13	—
38	April 19	at No. 15 Oklahoma State	No. 20	Allie P. Reynolds Stadium • Stillwater, Oklahoma	W 5–2	25–13	11–8
39	April 20	at No. 15 Oklahoma State	No. 20	Allie P. Reynolds Stadium • Stillwater, Oklahoma	L 4–8	25–14	11–9
40	April 21	at No. 15 Oklahoma State	No. 20	Allie P. Reynolds Stadium • Stillwater, Oklahoma	W 10–3	26–14	12–9
41	April 23	Texas–Pan American	No. 15	Haymarket Park • Lincoln, Nebraska	W 18–1	27–14	—
42	April 24	Texas–Pan American	No. 15	Haymarket Park • Lincoln, Nebraska	W 10–2	28–14	—
43	April 26	Kansas	No. 15	Haymarket Park • Lincoln, Nebraska	W 4–0	29–14	13–9
44	April 28	Kansas	No. 15	Haymarket Park • Lincoln, Nebraska	L 3–14	29–15	13–10
45	April 28	Kansas	No. 15	Haymarket Park • Lincoln, Nebraska	W 9–1	30–15	14–10
46	April 30	No. 14 Wichita State	No. 15	Haymarket Park • Lincoln, Nebraska	L 4–9	30–16	—

May (9–1)

#	Date	Opponent	Rank	Site/stadium	Score	Overall record	Big 12 record
47	May 3	at No. 5 Texas	No. 15	Disch–Falk Field • Austin, Texas	W 8–3	31–16	15–10
48	May 4	at No. 5 Texas	No. 15	Disch–Falk Field • Austin, Texas	L 2–3	31–17	15–11
49	May 5	at No. 5 Texas	No. 15	Disch–Falk Field • Austin, Texas	W 7–5	32–17	16–11
50	May 10	Cal Poly	No. 15	Haymarket Park • Lincoln, Nebraska	W 4–3	33–17	—
51	May 11	Cal Poly	No. 15	Haymarket Park • Lincoln, Nebraska	W 7–3	34–17	—
52	May 12	Cal Poly	No. 15	Haymarket Park • Lincoln, Nebraska	W 5–2	35–17	—
53	May 15	at Creighton	No. 13	Johnny Rosenblatt Stadium • Omaha, Nebraska	W 9–1	36–17	—
54	May 17	Louisiana Tech	No. 13	Haymarket Park • Lincoln, Nebraska	W 12–2	37–17	—
55	May 18	Louisiana Tech	No. 13	Haymarket Park • Lincoln, Nebraska	W 7–1	38–17	—
56	May 19	Louisiana Tech	No. 13	Haymarket Park • Lincoln, Nebraska	W 5–1	39–17	—

Postseason (8–4)
Big 12 Tournament (3–1)

#	Date	Opponent	Seed/Rank	Site/stadium	Score	Overall record	B12T record
57	May 22	vs. (7) No. 29 Baylor	(2) No. 13	The Ballpark in Arlington • Arlington, Texas	W 11–9	40–17	1–0
58	May 23	vs. (3) No. 17 Texas Tech	(2) No. 13	The Ballpark in Arlington • Arlington, Texas	W 12–8	41–17	2–0
59	May 25	vs. (6) Kansas State	(2) No. 13	The Ballpark in Arlington • Arlington, Texas	W 8–7	42–17	3–0
60	May 26	vs. (1) No. 5 Texas	(2) No. 13	The Ballpark in Arlington • Arlington, Texas	L 6–9	42–18	3–1

NCAA Lincoln Regional (3–0)

#	Date	Opponent	Seed/Rank	Site/stadium	Score	Overall record	NCAAT record
61	May 31	(4) Milwaukee	(1) No. 12	Haymarket Park • Lincoln, Nebraska	W 7–2	43–18	1–0
62	June 1	(3) Marist	(1) No. 12	Haymarket Park • Lincoln, Nebraska	W 9–1	44–18	2–0
63	June 2	(2) No. 28 Southwest Missouri State	(1) No. 12	Haymarket Park • Lincoln, Nebraska	W 14–3	45–18	3–0

NCAA Lincoln Super Regional (2–1)

#	Date	Opponent	Seed/Rank	Site/stadium	Score	Overall record	NCAAT record
64	June 7	No. 13 Richmond	No. 10	Haymarket Park • Lincoln, Nebraska	W 2–0	46–18	4–0
65	June 8	No. 13 Richmond	No. 10	Haymarket Park • Lincoln, Nebraska	L 2–6	46–19	4–1
66	June 9	No. 13 Richmond	No. 10	Haymarket Park • Lincoln, Nebraska	W 11–6	47–19	5–1

2002 College World Series (0–2)

#	Date	Opponent	Seed/Rank	Site/stadium	Score	Overall record	Big 12 record
67	June 14	vs. (2) No. 4 Clemson	No. 7	Johnny Rosenblatt Stadium • Omaha, Nebraska	L 10–11	47–20	16–11
68	June 16	vs. (6) No. 3 South Carolina	No. 7	Johnny Rosenblatt Stadium • Omaha, Nebraska	L 8–10	47–21	16–11

== Awards and honors ==
Jeff Blevins

- Honorable Mention All-Big 12

Will Bolt

- Honorable Mention All-Big 12

Daniel Bruce

- Honorable Mention Freshman All-American Collegiate Baseball

Brian Duensing

- Honorable Mention Freshman All-American Collegiate Baseball

Shane Komine

- Second Team All-American American Baseball Coaches Association
- Second Team All-American Baseball America
- Third Team All-American NBCSA

Jeff Leise

- First Team All-Big 12

Aaron Marsden

- First Team All-Big 12
- Big 12 Conference Baseball Newcomer of the Year

Jed Morris

- First Team All-Big 12
- Big 12 Conference Baseball Player of the Year
- Third Team All-American Baseball America

Phil Shirek

- Honorable Mention Freshman All-American Collegiate Baseball
