= 2002 Clemson Tigers baseball team =

Sports team

2002 Clemson Tigers baseball

Clemson Regional champions Clemson Super Regional champions

College World Series, 2–2
- Conference: Atlantic Coast Conference

Ranking
- Coaches: No. 3
- CB: No. 3
- Record: 54–17 (17-8 ACC)
- Head coach: Jack Leggett
- Home stadium: Beautiful Tiger Field

2002 Atlantic Coast Conference baseball standings
	Conf.				Overall
Team	W		L	PCT	W		L	PCT
No. 9 Florida State ‍†‍‡‍^{y}	18	–	6	.750	60	–	14	.811
No. 14 Wake Forest ‍‍‍^{y}	17	–	6	.739	47	–	13	.783
No. 19 North Carolina ‍‍‍^{y}	17	–	7	.708	43	–	21	.672
No. 3 Clemson ‍‍‍^{y}	16	–	8	.667	54	–	17	.761
No. 5 Georgia Tech ‍‍‍^{y}	14	–	9	.609	52	–	16	.765
Virginia ‍‍‍	8	–	16	.333	25	–	32	.439
NC State ‍‍‍	7	–	17	.292	33	–	26	.559
Maryland ‍‍‍	6	–	18	.250	34	–	23	.596
Duke ‍‍‍	4	–	20	.167	24	–	34	.414
† – Conference champion ‡ – Tournament champion y – Invited to the NCAA tournament As of June 30, 2002; Rankings from Collegiate Baseball

The 2002 Clemson Tigers baseball team represented Clemson University in the 2002 NCAA Division I baseball season. The team played their home games at Beautiful Tiger Field in Clemson, SC.

The team was coached by Jack Leggett, who completed his ninth season at Clemson. The Tigers reached the 2002 College World Series, their tenth appearance in Omaha.

== Roster ==
2002 Clemson Tigers roster
- Garrick Evans; - Zane Green; - Ryan Hub; - Collin Mahoney; - Seth Miller; - Jon Smith; - Roberto Valiente	Pitchers: - Chad Bendinelli; - Thomas Boozer; - Ryan Childs; - Jeff Hahn; - Paul Harrelson; - Matt Henrie - Junior; - Patrick Hogan; - Jeff Hourigan - Freshman; - Steven Jackson - Sophomore; - B. J. LaMura; - Tyler Lumsden; - Steve Reba - Senior	Catchers: - Steve Pyzik - Junior; Infielders: - Jeff Baker - Junior; - Khalil Greene - Senior; - Michael Johnson - Junior; - David Slevin - Junior	Outfielders: - L. J. DeMaino - Junior; - Kyle Frank - Junior; - Jarrod Schmidt - Junior; Utility: - Russell Triplett - RS Sophomore

== Schedule ==
Legend
	Clemson win
	Clemson loss
**Bold**	Clemson team member
*	Non-Conference game

2002 Clemson Tigers baseball game log (54–17)
Regular season (44–12)

February (3–0)
Date	Opponent	Rank	Site/stadium	Score	Overall record	ACC record
Feb 22	Auburn*	No. 4	Beautiful Tiger Field • Clemson, SC	**W** 7–4	1–0	
Feb 23	Auburn*	No. 4	Beautiful Tiger Field • Clemson, SC	**W** 8–5	2–0	
Feb 24	Auburn*	No. 4	Beautiful Tiger Field • Clemson, SC	**W** 6–5	3–0	

March (20–1)
Date	Opponent	Rank	Site/stadium	Score	Overall record	ACC record
Mar 1	at College of Charleston*	No. 3	CofC Baseball Stadium at Patriot's Point • Mount Pleasant, SC	**W** 14–6	4–0	
Mar 2	at No. 4 South Carolina*	No. 3	Sarge Frye Field • Columbia, SC	**W** 9–7	5–0	
Mar 3	No. 4 South Carolina*	No. 3	Beautiful Tiger Field • Clemson, SC	**W** 11–10^{10}	6–0	
Mar 6	College of Charleston*	No. 3	Beautiful Tiger Field • Clemson, SC	**W** 12–1	7–0	
Mar 8	Purdue*	No. 3	Beautiful Tiger Field • Clemson, SC	**W** 5–3	8–0	
Mar 9	Purdue*	No. 3	Beautiful Tiger Field • Clemson, SC	**W** 9–6	9–0	
Mar 10	Purdue*	No. 3	Beautiful Tiger Field • Clemson, SC	**W** 4–2	10–0	
Mar 12	Georgia Southern*	No. 2	Beautiful Tiger Field • Clemson, SC	**W** 20–8	11–0	
Mar 13	Georgia Southern*	No. 2	Beautiful Tiger Field • Clemson, SC	**W** 9–2	12–0	
Mar 15	South Alabama*	No. 2	Beautiful Tiger Field • Clemson, SC	**W** 13–1	13–0	
Mar 16	South Alabama*	No. 2	Beautiful Tiger Field • Clemson, SC	**L** 4–6	13–1	
Mar 17	South Alabama*	No. 2	Beautiful Tiger Field • Clemson, SC	**W** 11–3	14–1	
Mar 19	UNC Asheville*	No. 2	Beautiful Tiger Field • Clemson, SC	**W** 23–5	15–1	
Mar 21	Maine*	No. 2	Beautiful Tiger Field • Clemson, SC	**W** 8–0	16–1	
Mar 22	Maine*	No. 2	Beautiful Tiger Field • Clemson, SC	**W** 13–0	17–1	
Mar 23	Maine*	No. 2	Beautiful Tiger Field • Clemson, SC	**W** 8–3	18–1	
Mar 26	Coastal Carolina*	No. 1	Beautiful Tiger Field • Clemson, SC	**W** 19–1	19–1	
Mar 27	Coastal Carolina*	No. 1	Beautiful Tiger Field • Clemson, SC	**W** 6–2	20–1	
Mar 29	Maryland	No. 1	Beautiful Tiger Field • Clemson, SC	**W** 13–6	21–1	1–0
Mar 30	Maryland	No. 1	Beautiful Tiger Field • Clemson, SC	**W** 16–7	22–1	2–0
Mar 31	Maryland	No. 1	Beautiful Tiger Field • Clemson, SC	**W** 7–2	23–1	3–0

April (15–5)
Date	Opponent	Rank	Site/stadium	Score	Overall record	ACC record
Apr 2	East Tennessee State*	No. 1	Beautiful Tiger Field • Clemson, SC	**W** 7–1	24–1	
Apr 3	Winthrop*	No. 1	Beautiful Tiger Field • Clemson, SC	**W** 6–4	25–1	
Apr 5	NC State	No. 1	Beautiful Tiger Field • Clemson, SC	**W** 6–4	26–1	4–0
Apr 6	NC State	No. 1	Beautiful Tiger Field • Clemson, SC	**L** 0–3	26–2	4–1
Apr 7	NC State	No. 1	Beautiful Tiger Field • Clemson, SC	**W** 10–2	27–2	5–1
Apr 9	at Georgia*	No. 1	Foley Field • Athens, GA	**L** 4–5	27–3	
Apr 10	Georgia*	No. 1	Beautiful Tiger Field • Clemson, SC	**W** 6–5	28–3	
Apr 12	at No. 13 North Carolina	No. 1	Boshamer Stadium • Chapel Hill, NC	**W** 11–7^{10}	29–3	6–1
Apr 13	at No. 13 North Carolina	No. 1	Boshamer Stadium • Chapel Hill, NC	**W** 4–2	30–3	7–1
Apr 14	at No. 13 North Carolina	No. 1	Boshamer Stadium • Chapel Hill, NC	**L** 5–12	30–4	7–2
Apr 16	Western Carolina*	No. 1	Beautiful Tiger Field • Clemson, SC	**W** 13–9	31–4	
Apr 17	No. 7 South Carolina*	No. 1	Beautiful Tiger Field • Clemson, SC	**L** 6–8	31–5	
Apr 19	at Duke	No. 1	Jack Coombs Field • Durham, NC	**W** 5–3	32–5	8–2
Apr 20	at Duke	No. 1	Jack Coombs Field • Durham, NC	**W** 4–1	33–5	9–2
Apr 21	at Duke	No. 1	Jack Coombs Field • Durham, NC	**W** 2–1	34–5	10–2
Apr 23	Furman*	No. 1	Beautiful Tiger Field • Clemson, SC	**W** 18–7	35–5	
Apr 24	at No. 6 South Carolina*	No. 1	Sarge Frye Field • Columbia, SC	**W** 4–1	36–5	
Apr 26	No. 5 Wake Forest	No. 1	Beautiful Tiger Field • Clemson, SC	**L** 2–4	36–6	10–3
Apr 27	No. 5 Wake Forest	No. 1	Beautiful Tiger Field • Clemson, SC	**W** 5–3	37–6	11–3
Apr 28	No. 5 Wake Forest	No. 1	Beautiful Tiger Field • Clemson, SC	**W** 4–0	38–6	12–3

May (6–6)
Date	Opponent	Rank	Site/stadium	Score	Overall record	ACC record
May 4	at No. 13 Georgia Tech	No. 1	Russ Chandler Stadium • Atlanta, GA	**W** 12–9	39–6	13–3
May 5	at No. 13 Georgia Tech	No. 1	Russ Chandler Stadium • Atlanta, GA	**L** 6–15	39–7	13–4
May 6	at No. 13 Georgia Tech	No. 1	Russ Chandler Stadium • Atlanta, GA	**L** 0–11	39–8	13–5
May 8	Wofford*	No. 1	Beautiful Tiger Field • Clemson, SC	**W** 9–2	40–8	
May 9	Elon*	No. 1	Beautiful Tiger Field • Clemson, SC	**L** 6–8	40–9	
May 11	at Virginia	No. 1	Davenport Field • Charlottesville, VA	**W** 15–4	41–9	14–5
May 12	at Virginia	No. 1	Davenport Field • Charlottesville, VA	**W** 15–2	42–9	15–5
May 13	at Virginia	No. 1	Davenport Field • Charlottesville, VA	**W** 5–3	43–9	16–5
May 15	at Western Carolina*	No. 1	Hennon Stadium • Cullowhee, NC	**W** 12–4	44–9	
May 17	No. 7 Florida State	No. 1	Beautiful Tiger Field • Clemson, SC	**L** 3–9	44–10	16–6
May 18	No. 7 Florida State	No. 1	Beautiful Tiger Field • Clemson, SC	**L** 3–12	44–11	16–7
May 19	No. 7 Florida State	No. 1	Beautiful Tiger Field • Clemson, SC	**L** 3–9	44–12	16–8

Postseason (10–5)

ACC Tournament (3–2)
Date	Opponent	Rank	Site/stadium	Score	Overall record	ACCT Record
May 22	(5) No. 9 Georgia Tech	(4) No. 6	Florida Power Park • St. Petersburg, FL	**W** 10–0	45–12	1–0
May 23	(1) No. 1 Florida State	(4) No. 6	Florida Power Park • St. Petersburg, FL	**L** 4–9	45–13	1–1
May 24	(7) NC State	(4) No. 6	Florida Power Park • St. Petersburg, FL	**W** 5–3	46–13	2–1
May 25	(2) No. 2 Wake Forest	(4) No. 6	Florida Power Park • St. Petersburg, FL	**W** 8–6	47–13	3–1
May 25	(1) No. 1 Florida State	(4) No. 6	Florida Power Park • St. Petersburg, FL	**L** 1–4	47–14	3–2

NCAA Clemson Regional (3–0)
Date	Opponent	Rank	Site/stadium	Score	Overall record	Regional Record
May 31	(4) Georgia Southern	(1) No. 7	Beautiful Tiger Field • Clemson, SC	**W** 15–1	48–14	1–0
June 1	(2) No. 27 East Carolina	(1) No. 7	Beautiful Tiger Field • Clemson, SC	**W** 4–2	49–14	2–0
June 2	(2) No. 27 East Carolina	(1) No. 7	Beautiful Tiger Field • Clemson, SC	**W** 21–	50–14	3–0

NCAA Clemson Super Regional (2–1)
Date	Opponent	Rank	Site/stadium	Score	Overall record	SR Record
June 7	No. 18 Arkansas	(2) No. 5	Beautiful Tiger Field • Clemson, SC	**L** 6–9	50–15	0–1
June 8	No. 18 Arkansas	(2) No. 5	Beautiful Tiger Field • Clemson, SC	**W** 8–7	51–15	1–1
June 9	No. 18 Arkansas	(2) No. 5	Beautiful Tiger Field • Clemson, SC	**W** 7–4	52–15	2–1

NCAA College World Series (2–2)
Date	Opponent	Rank	Site/stadium	Score	Overall record	CWS record
June 14	No. 7 Nebraska	(2) No. 4	Johnny Rosenblatt Stadium • Omaha, NE	**W** 11–10	53–15	1–0
June 16	No. 6 Georgia Tech	(2) No. 4	Johnny Rosenblatt Stadium • Omaha, NE	**W** 9–7	54–15	2–0
June 19	(6) No. 3 South Carolina	(2) No. 4	Johnny Rosenblatt Stadium • Omaha, NE	**L** 4–12	54–16	2–1
June 21	(6) No. 3 South Carolina	(2) No. 4	Johnny Rosenblatt Stadium • Omaha, NE	**L** 2–10	54–17	2–2

== Ranking movements ==
Ranking movements Legend: ██ Increase in ranking ██ Decrease in ranking
	Week																				
Poll	Pre	1	2	3	4	5	6	7	8	9	10	11	12	13	14	15	16	17	18	19	Final
Coaches'		*																			3
Baseball America																					3
Collegiate Baseball^	6	6	4	4	3	3	2	2	1	1	1	1	1	1	1	1	6	7	5	4	3
NCBWA†	4	6	5	5	3	2	2	2	1	1	1	1	1	1	1	1	7	6	6*	6*	3

^ Collegiate Baseball ranked 40 teams in their preseason poll, but only ranked 30 teams weekly during the season.
† NCBWA ranks 30 teams in their preseason poll, but only ranks 25 teams weekly during the season.
* A new poll was not released for this week, so for comparison purposes, the previous week's ranking is inserted in this week's slot.
