= USA Today Sports =

American sports magazine

- Categories: Sports magazine
- Frequency: Weekly
- First issue: April 5, 1991; 35 years ago (as USA Today Baseball Weekly)
- Company: Gannett
- Country: United States
- Based in: McLean, Virginia
- Language: English
- Website: www.usatoday.com/sports/
- ISSN: 1541-5228

USA Today Sports is an American sports website owned by the Gannett Company. It is a vertical of Gannett's flagship newspaper USA Today. It is the publisher of USA Today Sports Weekly, an American sports news magazine published weekly. The website and magazine largely feature coverage of baseball news from Major League Baseball (MLB), Minor League Baseball and the National Collegiate Athletic Association (NCAA) from spring to early fall, as well as football coverage from the National Football League (NFL) during the fall and winter months. The magazine also features statistics for each covered league and interviews with players and staff members.

Sharing production facilities with its parent publication at Gannett's corporate headquarters in McLean, Virginia, Sports Weekly is printed on newsprint and distributed throughout the United States and Canada. The magazine is regularly published on Wednesdays, though special editions that preview major events (such as the World Series and the Super Bowl) or cover fantasy sports are released several times per year, typically on newsprint of better quality than that used in the weekly editions.

== Magazine history ==
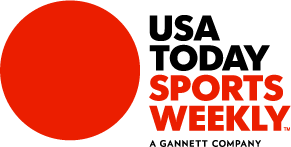
USA Today Sports Weekly logo

The magazine was first published by Gannett as USA Today Baseball Weekly, formatted as a tabloid-sized publication focusing exclusively on baseball coverage that launched on April 5, 1991, in concert with the first week of regular season play for that year's Major League Baseball season. In the early years of publication, it was released on a weekly basis during the baseball season and bi-weekly during the off-season.

The publication was renamed USA Today Sports Weekly on September 4, 2002, preceding the official start of the 2002 NFL season, when it began to incorporate stories and statistics about the NFL. The editorial operations of Sports Weekly originally operated autonomously from those managed by the sports department of USA Today, before being integrated with its parent newspaper's sports unit in late 2005.

Sports Weekly added coverage and interviews from the NASCAR circuit beginning with the February 15, 2006 issue. However this lasted only for the auto racing organization's 2006 racing season, with Gannett announcing it was dropping weekly coverage of NASCAR from Sports Weekly after one season after the November 22, 2006 issue of the publication; although it would continue to issue three special editions dedicated to NASCAR on an annual basis. For the 2007 professional and collegiate baseball season, USA Today Sports Weekly announced that it would incorporate more comprehensive baseball coverage, along with the return of college baseball features; beginning with the August 8 issue that year, the magazine also added weekly coverage of the NCAA college football season.

== For The Win ==
USA Today Sports launched For The Win (FTW), a platform hosting user-generated viral sports content blending original and aggregated material with eye-catching headlines in 2013. Jamie Mottram was its founding editor. The site was inspired by BuzzFeed and Upworthy. It produces shareable, mobile-friendly posts about trending sports topics which led to rapid growth in unique visitors and social media engagement with a heavy focus on sponsored content.

== In popular culture ==
- The first episode of Eastbound & Down included a fictional cover of Sports Weekly featuring the main character.
- In a 2006 episode of Family Guy, the main character Peter Griffin is seen reading Sports Weekly on a plane traveling to London.
- In the 2001 baseball comedy film Summer Catch, one scene features an announcer's booth at a Cape Cod League stadium accidentally being lit on fire when a cigarette ash falls on a pile of fictional Baseball Weekly issues.
- In the 2001 comedy film Shallow Hal, the character Mauricio (Jason Alexander) is shown reading a copy of Baseball Weekly.
- A photo of Bob Dylan appeared in an issue of Rolling Stone in which he was reading Baseball Weekly in a 7-Eleven store.
