= 2002 NCAA Division I baseball tournament =

American college sports championship

- Season: 2002
- Teams: 64
- Finals site: Johnny Rosenblatt Stadium; Omaha, NE
- Champions: Texas (5th title)
- Runner-up: South Carolina (6th CWS Appearance)
- Winning coach: Augie Garrido (4th title)
- MOP: Huston Street (Texas)

The 2002 NCAA Division I baseball tournament was played at the end of the 2002 NCAA Division I baseball season to determine the national champion of college baseball. The tournament concluded with eight teams competing in the College World Series, a double-elimination tournament in its fifty sixth year. Sixteen regional competitions were held to determine the participants in the final event, with each winner advancing to a best of three series against another regional champion for the right to play in the College World Series. Each region was composed of four teams, resulting in 64 teams participating in the tournament at the conclusion of their regular season, and in some cases, after a conference tournament. The fifty-sixth tournament's champion was Texas, coached by Augie Garrido. This was Texas' first title since 1983, but Augie Garrido previously won three titles with Cal State Fullerton. The Most Outstanding Player was Huston Street of Texas.

Due to fears over terrorism and travel security in the wake of the September 11 attacks, the Division I Baseball Committee, which selects the 64-team field and places the teams on the bracket, was ordered by the NCAA to keep regional pairings as localized as possible, in order to minimize the number of plane trips utilized. Due to these travel constraints, teams from the same conference were allowed to play in the same regional for the first time. An example of the travel restrictions came from the regional in Baton Rouge, Louisiana, featuring four schools from the Bayou State which are located a total of 130 miles (210 km) apart along Interstate 10, the first time (and to date, last) a regional has been entirely an in-state affair outside California, Florida, and Texas. The travel restrictions were eased in 2003, and the ban on conference teams facing each other in regional play was reinstated.

== Bids ==
=== Automatic bids ===
Conference champions from 30 Division I conferences earned automatic bids to regionals. The remaining 34 spots were awarded to schools as at-large invitees.

Conference	School	Berth type
America East	Maine	Tournament champion
ACC	Florida State	Tournament champion
Atlantic Sun	UCF	Tournament champion
A-10	George Washington	Tournament champion
Big East	Notre Dame	Tournament champion
Big South	Coastal Carolina	Tournament champion
Big Ten	Ohio State	Tournament champion
Big 12	Texas	Tournament champion
Big West	Cal State Northridge	Regular-season champion
CAA	VCU	Tournament champion
Conference USA	East Carolina	Tournament champion
Horizon League	Milwaukee	Tournament champion
Ivy League	Harvard	Championship series winner
MAAC	Marist	Tournament champion
MAC	Kent State	Tournament champion
Mid-Con	Oral Roberts	Tournament champion
MEAC	Bethune-Cookman	Tournament champion
Missouri Valley	Wichita State	Tournament champion
MWC	BYU	Tournament champion
NEC	Central Connecticut	Tournament champion
OVC	Southeast Missouri State	Tournament champion
Pac-10	Southern California	Regular-season champion
Patriot League	Navy	Tournament champion
SEC	Alabama	Tournament champion
SoCon	Georgia Southern	Tournament champion
Southland	Lamar	Tournament champion
SWAC	Southern	Tournament champion
Sun Belt	New Mexico State	Tournament champion
WCC	San Diego	Championship series winner
WAC	Rice	Regular-season champion

=== Bids by conference ===
Conference	Total	Schools
Southeastern	7	Alabama, Arkansas, Auburn, Florida, Georgia, LSU, South Carolina
Atlantic Coast	5	Clemson, Florida State, Georgia Tech, North Carolina, Wake Forest
Big 12	5	Baylor, Nebraska, Oklahoma, Texas, Texas Tech
Conference USA	5	East Carolina, Houston, Louisville, South Florida, Tulane
Pacific-10	4	Arizona State, Stanford, Southern California, Washington
Sun Belt	4	FIU, Louisiana–Lafayette, New Mexico State, South Alabama
Atlantic Sun	3	UCF, Florida Atlantic, Stetson
Big West	3	Cal State Fullerton, Cal State Northridge, Long Beach State
Atlantic 10	2	George Washington, Richmond
Big South	2	Coastal Carolina, Elon
Colonial Athletic	2	James Madison, VCU
Missouri Valley	2	Southwest Missouri State, Wichita State
Western Athletic	2	Rice, San Jose State
America East	1	Maine
Big East	1	Notre Dame
Big Ten	1	Ohio State
Horizon	1	Milwaukee
Independent	1	Miami (FL)
Ivy	1	Harvard
Metro Atlantic	1	Marist
Mid-American	1	Kent State
Mid-Continent	1	Oral Roberts
Mid-Eastern	1	Bethune-Cookman
Mountain West	1	BYU
Northeast	1	Central Connecticut
Ohio Valley	1	Southeast Missouri State
Patriot	1	Navy
Southern	1	Georgia Southern
Southland	1	Lamar
Southwestern Athletic	1	Southern
West Coast	1	San Diego

=== Notes on tournament field ===
- Central Connecticut State, Elon, Louisville, New Mexico St., and San Diego were making their first NCAA tournament appearance.

=== National seeds ===
Bold indicates CWS participant.

1. Florida State (lost super regional at home vs. Notre Dame)
2. **Clemson**
3. Alabama (eliminated by Florida Atlantic in regional at home)
4. **Rice**
5. **Texas**
6. **South Carolina**
7. Wake Forest (eliminated by Richmond in regional at home)
8. **Stanford**

== Regionals and super regionals ==
Bold indicates winner.

=== Tallahassee Super Regional ===
First round	Second round
**1**	**Florida State**	**11**
4	Stetson	8
1	**Florida State**	**7**
2	UCF	3
3	South Florida	1
2	**UCF**	**6**
Tallahassee Regional–Dick Howser Stadium
4	Stetson	13
3	**South Florida**	**14**
3	**South Florida**	**7**
2	UCF	2
1	**South Alabama**	**7**
4	Kent State	4
1	South Alabama	1
2	**Notre Dame**	**25**
3	Ohio State	6
2	**Notre Dame**	**8**
South Bend Regional–Frank Eck Stadium
4	Kent State	8
3	**Ohio State**	**12**
3	**Ohio State**	**6**
1	South Alabama	4

Regional finals
1	**Florida State**	**13**	—
3	South Florida	6	—
2	**Notre Dame**	**9**	—
3	Ohio State	6	—

Super regionals
1	Florida State	4	**12**	1
**Notre Dame**	**10**	5	**3**

=== Clemson Super Regional ===
First round	Second round
1	**Clemson**	**15**
4	Georgia Southern	1
1	**Clemson**	**4**
2	East Carolina	2
3	Elon	7
2	**East Carolina**	**13**
Clemson Regional–Doug Kingsmore Stadium
4	**Georgia Southern**	**6**
3	Elon	2
4	Georgia Southern	3
2	**East Carolina**	**7**
1	Wichita State	1
4	**Oral Roberts**	**6**
4	Oral Roberts	6
3	**Arkansas**	**7**
3	**Arkansas**	**8**
2	Oklahoma	5
Wichita Regional–Eck Stadium
1	**Wichita State**	**8**
2	Oklahoma	4
1	Wichita State	8
4	**Oral Roberts**	**15**

Regional finals
1	**Clemson**	**21**	—
2	East Carolina	1	—
3	**Arkansas**	**11**	—
4	Oral Roberts	6	—

Super regionals
2	**Clemson**	6	**8**	**7**
Arkansas	**9**	7	4

=== Atlanta Super Regional ===
First round	Second round
1	Alabama	4
4	**Southeast Missouri State**	**7**
4	Southeast Missouri State	6
3	**Florida Atlantic**	**12**
3	**Florida Atlantic**	**16**
2	Auburn	11
Tuscaloosa Regional–Sewell-Thomas Stadium
1	**Alabama**	**6**
2	Auburn	3
1	**Alabama**	**7**
4	Southeast Missouri State	4
1	**Georgia Tech**	**6**
4	Coastal Carolina	0
1	**Georgia Tech**	**3**
2	Georgia	0
3	Louisville	1
2	**Georgia**	**7**
Atlanta Regional–Russ Chandler Stadium
4	**Coastal Carolina**	**9**
3	Louisville	1
4	Coastal Carolina	7
2	**Georgia**	**9**

Regional finals
3	**Florida Atlantic**	2	**6**
1	Alabama	**7**	5
1	**Georgia Tech**	**8**	—
2	Georgia	7	—

Super regionals
Florida Atlantic	3	5	—
**Georgia Tech**	**14**	**11**	—

=== Houston Super Regional ===
First round	Second round
1	**Rice**	**8**
4	Harvard	3
1	**Rice**	**6**
2	Texas Tech	0
3	Washington	4
2	**Texas Tech**	**5**
Houston Regional–Reckling Park
4	Harvard	2
3	**Washington**	**4**
3	**Washington**	**3**
2	Texas Tech	1
1	**LSU**	**5**
4	Southern	4
1	LSU	0
2	**Louisiana–Lafayette**	**5**
3	Tulane	3
2	**Louisiana–Lafayette**	**6**
Baton Rouge Regional–Alex Box Stadium
4	Southern	2
3	**Tulane**	**10**
3	Tulane	2
1	**LSU**	**4**

Regional finals
1	**Rice**	6	**14**
3	Washington	**7**	2
2	Louisiana–Lafayette	2	2
1	**LSU**	**12**	**12**

Super regionals
4	**Rice**	**6**	**3**	—
LSU	0	0	—

=== Austin Super Regional ===
First round	Second round
1	**Texas**	**7**
4	Central Connecticut	2
1	**Texas**	**10**
2	Baylor	8
3	Lamar	2
2	**Baylor**	**4**
Austin Regional–Disch–Falk Field
4	Central Connecticut	4
3	**Lamar**	**9**
3	Lamar	9
2	**Baylor**	**10**
1	**Houston**	**9**
4	New Mexico State	0
1	**Houston**	**8**
2	Arizona State	4
3	San Diego	3
2	**Arizona State**	**6**
†Mesa Regional–HoHoKam Park
4	New Mexico State	1
3	**San Diego**	**2**
3	San Diego	1
2	**Arizona State**	**11**

Regional finals
1	**Texas**	**2**	—
2	Baylor	0	—
1	**Houston**	**8**	—
2	Arizona State	3	—

Super regionals
5	**Texas**	0	**17**	**5**
Houston	**2**	2	2

†Arizona State hosted at HoHoKam Park in Mesa, Arizona, where they played their 2002 season due to construction at Packard Stadium.

=== Columbia Super Regional ===
First round	Second round
1	**South Carolina**	**6**
4	VCU	3
1	**South Carolina**	**9**
2	North Carolina	6
3	James Madison	0
2	**North Carolina**	**5**
Columbia Regional–Sarge Frye Field
4	VCU	2
3	**James Madison**	**5**
3	James Madison	7
2	**North Carolina**	**9**
1	**Florida**	**13**
4	Bethune-Cookman	1
1	Florida	2
3	**Miami (FL)**	**7**
3	**Miami (FL)**	**9**
2	FIU	1
Gainesville Regional–McKethan Stadium
4	**Bethune-Cookman**	**7**
2	FIU	4
4	Bethune-Cookman	10
1	**Florida**	**21**

Regional finals
1	**South Carolina**	4	**3**
2	North Carolina	**8**	1
3	**Miami (FL)**	10	**8**
1	Florida	**11**^{10}	7

Super regionals
6	**South Carolina**	**10**	2	**6**
Miami (FL)	7	**5**	4

=== Lincoln Super Regional ===
First round	Second round
1	**Wake Forest**	**12**
4	George Washington	6
1	Wake Forest	2
2	**Richmond**	**3**
3	Navy	5
2	**Richmond**	**15**
Winston-Salem Regional–Ernie Shore Field
4	George Washington	4
3	**Navy**	**6**
3	Navy	1
1	**Wake Forest**	**13**
1	**Nebraska**	**7**
4	Milwaukee	2
1	**Nebraska**	**9**
3	Marist	1
3	**Marist**	**5**^{11}
2	Southwest Missouri State	4
Lincoln Regional–Haymarket Park
4	Milwaukee	1
2	**Southwest Missouri State**	**6**
2	**Southwest Missouri State**	**5**
3	Marist	2

Regional finals
2	**Richmond**	4	**7**
1	Wake Forest	**5**^{10}	5
1	**Nebraska**	**14**	—
2	Southwest Missouri State	3	—

Super regionals
Richmond	0	**6**	6
**Nebraska**	**2**	2	**11**

=== Stanford Super Regional ===
First round	Second round
1	**Stanford**	**3**^{13}
4	Cal State Fullerton	2
1	**Stanford**	**5**
2	Long Beach State	4
3	San Jose State	3
2	**Long Beach State**	**6**
Stanford Regional–Sunken Diamond
4	**Cal State Fullerton**	**9**
3	San Jose State	1
4	Cal State Fullerton	0
2	**Long Beach State**	**4**
1	**Southern California**	**5**^{12}
4	BYU	4
1	**Southern California**	**7**
2	Cal State Northridge	5
3	Maine	4
2	**Cal State Northridge**	**7**
Los Angeles Regional–Dedeaux Field
4	**BYU**	**12**
3	Maine	5
4	**BYU**	**7**
2	Cal State Northridge	2

Regional finals
1	**Stanford**	**8**	—
2	Long Beach State	4	—
1	**Southern California**	**13**	—
4	BYU	10	—

Super regionals
8	**Stanford**	**4**	**5**	—
Southern California	2	3	—

== College World Series ==
=== Participants ===
School	Conference	Record (conference)	Head coach	CWS appearances	Best CWS finish	CWS record Not including this year
Clemson	ACC	52–15 (16–8)	Jack Leggett	9 (last: 2000)	3rd (1996)	7–18
Georgia Tech	ACC	51–14 (14–9)	Danny Hall	1 (last: 1994)	2nd (1994)	3–1
Nebraska	Big 12	47–19 (16–11)	Dave Van Horn	1 (last: 2001)	7th (2001)	0–2
Notre Dame	Big East	49–16 (18–8)	Paul Mainieri	1 (last: 1957)	4th (1957)	2–2
Rice	WAC	52–12 (28–2)	Wayne Graham	2 (last: 1999)	6th (1999)	1–4
South Carolina	SEC	53–16 (21–8)	Ray Tanner	5 (last: 1985)	2nd (1975, 1977)	9–10
Stanford	Pac-10	45–16 (16–8)	Mark Marquess	13 (last: 2001)	1st (1987, 1988)	31–22
Texas	Big 12	53–15 (19–8)	Augie Garrido	28 (last: 2000)	1st (1949, 1950, 1975, 1983)	64–49

=== Results ===
==== Bracket ====
First round
Notre Dame	3
8	Stanford	4
5	Texas	2
4	Rice	1
Notre Dame	5
4	Rice	3
2	Clemson	11
Nebraska	10
6	South Carolina	0
Georgia Tech	11
Nebraska	8
6	South Carolina	10

Second round
8	Stanford	7
5	Texas	8
Notre Dame	3
8	Stanford	5
2	Clemson	9
Georgia Tech	7
6	South Carolina	9
Georgia Tech	5

Semifinals
5	Texas	6	—
8	Stanford	5	—
2	Clemson	4	2
6	South Carolina	12	10

Finals
5	Texas	12
6	South Carolina	6

==== Game results ====
Date	Game	Winner	Score	Loser	Notes
June 14	Game 1	Georgia Tech	11–0	South Carolina	
June 14	Game 2	Clemson	11–10	Nebraska	
June 15	Game 3	Stanford	4–3	Notre Dame	
June 15	Game 4	Texas	2–1	Rice	
June 16	Game 5	South Carolina	10–8	Nebraska	Nebraska eliminated
June 16	Game 6	Clemson	9–7	Georgia Tech	
June 17	Game 7	Notre Dame	5–3	Rice	Rice eliminated
June 17	Game 8	Texas	8–7	Stanford	
June 18	Game 9	South Carolina	9–5	Georgia Tech	Georgia Tech eliminated
June 18	Game 10	Stanford	5–3	Notre Dame	Notre Dame eliminated
June 19	Game 11	South Carolina	12–4	Clemson	
June 20	Game 12	Texas	6–5	Stanford	Stanford eliminated
June 21	Game 13	South Carolina	10–2	Clemson	Clemson eliminated
June 22	Final	Texas	12–6	South Carolina	Texas wins CWS

==== Championship Game ====
Saturday, June 22, 2002 12:40 pm (CT) at Johnny Rosenblatt Stadium in Omaha, Nebraska
Team	1	2	3	4	5	6	7	8	9	R	H	E
South Carolina	1	1	0	0	0	0	2	2	0	6	10	3
Texas	3	1	0	0	3	1	0	4	X	12	13	2
WP: Justin Simmons (16–1) LP: Aaron Rawl (7–2) Sv: Huston Street (14); Attendance: 24,089; Notes: Texas wins fifth CWS title Boxscore

=== All-Tournament Team ===
The following players were members of the College World Series All-Tournament Team.

Position	Player	School
P	Justin Simmons	Texas
P	Huston Street (MOP)	Texas
C	Landon Powell	South Carolina
1B	Michael Johnson	Clemson
2B	Tim Moss	Texas
3B	Omar Quintanilla	Texas
SS	Victor Menocal	Georgia Tech
OF	Sam Fuld	Stanford
OF	Justin Harris	South Carolina
OF	Dustin Majewski	Texas
DH	Steve Stanley	Notre Dame

== Tournament notes ==
- This was the last College World Series championship to be decided by a single game as the final was moved to a best-of-three format the following year.

== See also ==
- 2002 NCAA Division II baseball tournament
- 2002 NCAA Division III baseball tournament
- 2002 NAIA World Series
