= 2002 Southeastern Conference baseball tournament =

- Teams: 8
- Format: Two pools of four-team double elimination
- Finals site: Hoover Metropolitan Stadium; Hoover, Alabama
- Champions: Alabama (6th title)
- Winning coach: Jim Wells (5th title)
- MVP: Brent Boyd (Alabama)
- Attendance: 124,440

2002 Southeastern Conference baseball standings
	Conf.				Overall
Team	W		L	PCT	W		L	PCT
Eastern
No. 2 South Carolina ^{x}‍†‍‍^{y}	21	–	8	.724	53	–	16	.768
No. 20 Florida ‍‍‍^{y}	20	–	10	.667	46	–	19	.708
Georgia ‍‍‍^{y}	15	–	15	.500	32	–	29	.525
Tennessee ‍‍‍	12	–	18	.400	27	–	28	.491
Vanderbilt ‍‍‍	7	–	21	.250	24	–	27	.471
Kentucky ‍‍‍	6	–	24	.200	17	–	36	.321
Western
No. 16 Alabama ^{x}‍‍‡‍^{y}	20	–	10	.667	51	–	15	.773
No. 11 LSU ‍‍‍^{y}	19	–	10	.655	44	–	22	.667
Auburn ‍‍‍^{y}	15	–	15	.500	34	–	26	.567
Mississippi State ‍‍‍	14	–	15	.483	34	–	24	.586
No. 18 Arkansas ‍‍‍^{y}	13	–	14	.481	35	–	28	.556
Ole Miss ‍‍‍	14	–	16	.467	37	–	19	.661
x – Division champion † – Conference champion ‡ – Tournament champion y – Invited to the NCAA tournament As of June 30, 2002; Rankings from Collegiate Baseball

The 2002 Southeastern Conference baseball tournament was held at Hoover Metropolitan Stadium in Hoover, AL from May 22 through 26. Alabama won the tournament and earned the Southeastern Conference's automatic bid to the 2002 NCAA tournament.

== Regular season Results ==
Eastern Division
Team	W	L	Pct	GB	Seed
South Carolina	21	8	.724	--	1
Florida	20	10	.667	1.5	3
Georgia	15	15	.500	6.5	6
Tennessee	12	18	.400	9.5	--
Vanderbilt	7	21	.250	13.5	--
Kentucky	6	24	.200	15.5	--

Western Division
Team	W	L	Pct	GB	Seed
Alabama	20	10	.667	--	2
LSU	19	10	.655	0.5	4
Auburn	15	15	.500	5	5
Mississippi State	14	15	.483	5.5	7
Arkansas	13	14	.481	5.5	8
Ole Miss	14	16	.467	6	--

== Tournament ==
First round
6	Georgia	2
3	Florida	7
7	Mississippi State	2
2	Alabama	12
6	Georgia	3
7	Mississippi State	10
5	Auburn	1
4	LSU	2
8	Arkansas	1
1	South Carolina	10
5	Auburn	5
8	Arkansas	8

Second round
3	Florida	4
2	Alabama	7
7	Mississippi State	0
3	Florida	5
4	LSU	8
1	South Carolina	3
8	Arkansas	2
1	South Carolina	6

Semifinals
2	Alabama	4	11
3	Florida	7	9
4	LSU	8	4
1	South Carolina	10	5

Finals
2	Alabama	6
1	South Carolina	2

- Vanderbilt, Tennessee, Ole Miss and Kentucky did not make the tournament.

== All-Tournament Team ==
Position	Player	School
P	Jeff Norris	Alabama
P	Gary Bell	South Carolina
C	Cody Clark	Arkansas
1B	Brent Boyd	Alabama
2B	Pete Stonard	Alabama
3B	Pat Osborn	Florida
SS	Drew Meyer	South Carolina
OF	Ben Harrison	Florida
OF	Matt Heath	LSU
OF	Steve Thomas	South Carolina
DH	Ryan Shealy	Florida
MVP	Brent Boyd	Alabama

== See also ==
- College World Series
- NCAA Division I Baseball Championship
- Southeastern Conference baseball tournament
