= 2002 Notre Dame Fighting Irish baseball team =

American college baseball season

2002 Notre Dame Fighting Irish baseball

Big East Conference champions Big East Conference Tournament champions South Bend Regional champions Tallahassee Super Regional champions

College World Series, 4th
- Conference: Big East Conference

Ranking
- Coaches: No. 7
- CB: No. 6
- Record: 50–18 (18–8 Big East)
- Head coach: Paul Mainieri (8th season)
- Assistant coach: Wally Widelski (2nd season)
- Hitting coach: Dusty Lepper (3rd season)
- Pitching coach: Brian O'Connor (8th season)
- Captains: Andrew Bushey; Steve Stanley
- Home stadium: Frank Eck Stadium

2002 Big East Conference baseball standings
| | Conf. | | | | | | Overall |
| Team | W | | L | | T | PCT | W | | L | | T | PCT |
|---|---|---|---|---|---|---|---|---|---|---|---|---|
| No. 6 Notre Dame ‍†‍‡‍^{y} | 18 | – | 8 | – | 0 | .692 | 50 | – | 18 | – | 0 | .735 |
| Virginia Tech ‍‍‍ | 18 | – | 8 | – | 0 | .692 | 33 | – | 26 | – | 0 | .559 |
| Boston College ‍‍‍ | 15 | – | 11 | – | 0 | .577 | 30 | – | 25 | – | 0 | .545 |
| Rutgers ‍‍‍ | 15 | – | 11 | – | 0 | .577 | 25 | – | 22 | – | 0 | .532 |
| Pittsburgh ‍‍‍ | 14 | – | 11 | – | 0 | .560 | 36 | – | 16 | – | 1 | .689 |
| St. John's ‍‍‍ | 14 | – | 12 | – | 0 | .538 | 29 | – | 23 | – | 0 | .558 |
| Connecticut ‍‍‍ | 13 | – | 12 | – | 0 | .520 | 28 | – | 22 | – | 0 | .560 |
| Villanova ‍‍‍ | 12 | – | 13 | – | 0 | .480 | 30 | – | 23 | – | 0 | .566 |
| Seton Hall ‍‍‍ | 11 | – | 15 | – | 0 | .423 | 25 | – | 28 | – | 0 | .472 |
| West Virginia ‍‍‍ | 9 | – | 16 | – | 0 | .360 | 24 | – | 26 | – | 0 | .480 |
| Georgetown ‍‍‍ | 2 | – | 24 | – | 0 | .077 | 9 | – | 47 | – | 0 | .161 |
† – Conference champion ‡ – Tournament champion y – Invited to the NCAA tournament As of June 30, 2002; Rankings from Collegiate Baseball

The 2002 Notre Dame Fighting Irish baseball team represented the University of Notre Dame in the 2002 NCAA Division I baseball season. The Fighting Irish played their home games at Frank Eck Stadium. The team was coached by Paul Mainieri in his 8th year as head coach at Notre Dame.

The Fighting Irish won the South Bend Regional and the Tallahassee Super Regional to advance to the College World Series, where they were defeated by the Stanford Cardinal.

== Roster ==
2002 Notre Dame Fighting Irish baseball team
Players
Coaches

| # | Pos. | Name | B/T | Height | Weight | Year | Home town |
|---|---|---|---|---|---|---|---|
| 2 | OF | Steve Stanley (C) | L/L | 5 ft 8 in (1.73 m) | 155 lb (70 kg) | Sr | Upper Arlington, Ohio |
| 3 | INF | Steve Sollmann | R/R | 5 ft 10 in (1.78 m) | 190 lb (86 kg) | So | Cincinnati, Ohio |
| 5 | RHP | Drew Duff | R/R | 5 ft 11 in (1.8 m) | 190 lb (86 kg) | Sr | Sevierville, Tennessee |
| 6 | INF | Geoff Milsom | L/R | 6 ft 1 in (1.85 m) | 195 lb (88 kg) | Fr | New York, New York |
| 7 | INF | Zach Sisko | L/R | 6 ft 1 in (1.85 m) | 195 lb (88 kg) | So | Belleville, Illinois |
| 8 | OF | Kris Billmaier | R/R | 5 ft 10 in (1.78 m) | 200 lb (91 kg) | Jr | Woodinville, Washington |
| 9 | OF | Matt Bok | S/R | 5 ft 10 in (1.78 m) | 190 lb (86 kg) | Sr | Akron, Ohio |
| 10 | RHP | Chris Niesel | R/R | 5 ft 11 in (1.8 m) | 205 lb (93 kg) | Fr | Plantation, Florida |
| 11 | | Matt Macri | R/R | 6 ft 1 in (1.85 m) | 185 lb (84 kg) | Fr | Clive, Iowa |
| 12 | INF | Andrew Bushy (C) | L/R | 5 ft 10 in (1.78 m) | 190 lb (86 kg) | Sr | Boardman, Ohio |
| 13 | C | Jay Molina | R/R | 5 ft 11 in (1.8 m) | 195 lb (88 kg) | Fr | Moline, Illinois |
| 14 | | Matt Edwards | R/R | 6 ft 1 in (1.85 m) | 180 lb (82 kg) | Fr | Mechanicsville, Virginia |
| 15 | INF | Javier Sanchez | R/R | 6 ft 2 in (1.88 m) | 200 lb (91 kg) | So | Miami, Florida |
| 17 | INF | Ken Meyer | R/R | 6 ft 0 in (1.83 m) | 205 lb (93 kg) | Sr | Fort Myers, Florida |
| 18 | | Brent Weiss | R/R | 6 ft 1 in (1.85 m) | 215 lb (98 kg) | Fr | Cockeysville, Maryland |
| 19 | OF | Brian Stavisky | L/R | 6 ft 3 in (1.91 m) | 220 lb (100 kg) | Jr | Port Allegany, Pennsylvania |
| 20 | RHP | Peter Ogilvie | R/R | 6 ft 3 in (1.91 m) | 215 lb (98 kg) | Jr | Buffalo Grove, Illinois |
| 21 | | Joe Thaman | L/L | 6 ft 4 in (1.93 m) | 210 lb (95 kg) | So | St. Louis, Missouri |
| 22 | RHP | Grant Johnson | R/R | 6 ft 6 in (1.98 m) | 220 lb (100 kg) | Fr | Burr Ridge, Illinois |
| 23 | RHP | Martin Vergara | R/R | 6 ft 0 in (1.83 m) | 185 lb (84 kg) | Fr | Paterson, New Jersey |
| 25 | INF | Mike Holba | R/R | 6 ft 0 in (1.83 m) | 185 lb (84 kg) | Jr | Lansing, Illinois |
| 27 | C | Paul O'Toole | L/R | 6 ft 1 in (1.85 m) | 205 lb (93 kg) | Sr | Lakewood, Ohio |
| 29 | LHP | Cody Wilkins | R/L | 6 ft 1 in (1.85 m) | 225 lb (102 kg) | So | Hudson, North Carolina |
| 30 | RHP | Mike Morgalis | R/R | 6 ft 4 in (1.93 m) | 205 lb (93 kg) | So | Cincinnati, Ohio |
| 32 | RHP | Ryan Kalita | R/R | 6 ft 2 in (1.88 m) | 210 lb (95 kg) | Jr | Oak Park, Illinois |
| 33 | LHP | Scott Bickford | R/L | 6 ft 4 in (1.93 m) | 160 lb (73 kg) | Fr | Owings, Maryland |
| 35 | | Matt Strickroth | R/R | 6 ft 4 in (1.93 m) | 230 lb (104 kg) | Sr | Mission Viejo, California |
| 37 | RHP | Matt Laird | R/R | 6 ft 0 in (1.83 m) | 195 lb (88 kg) | Jr | Bellaire, Texas |
| 38 | RHP | Tyler Jones | R/R | 6 ft 4 in (1.93 m) | 205 lb (93 kg) | Fr | Arlington, Texas |
| 39 | RHP | Matt Buchmeier | R/R | 6 ft 0 in (1.83 m) | 195 lb (88 kg) | Sr | Greenwood, Indiana |
| 40 | OF | George Howard | R/R | 5 ft 7 in (1.7 m) | 145 lb (66 kg) | Fr | Pine Bluff, Arkansas |
| 44 | C | Mike Milligan | R/R | 5 ft 10 in (1.78 m) | 240 lb (109 kg) | Fr | Oklahoma City, Oklahoma |
| 45 | RHP | Brandon Viloria | R/R | 5 ft 11 in (1.8 m) | 210 lb (95 kg) | Jr | Wailuku, Hawaii |
| 46 | RHP | J. P. Gagne | R/R | 6 ft 0 in (1.83 m) | 200 lb (91 kg) | Jr | Bloomington, Minnesota |
| 49 | RHP | John Axford | R/R | 6 ft 5 in (1.96 m) | 175 lb (79 kg) | Fr | Port Dover, Ontario |

Head coach

1 Paul Mainieri

Assistant coach(es)

28 Wally Widelski

Hitting coach(es)

4 Dusty Lepper

Pitching coach(es)

26 Brian O'Connor

Legend

- (C) Team captain
- (S) Suspended
- (I) Ineligible
- Injured
- Current redshirt

Roster
Last update: October 2, 2021

== Schedule ==
2002 Notre Dame Fighting Irish baseball game log
Regular season
February (1–2)

| Date | Opponent | Rank | Site/stadium | Score | Win | Loss | Save | Attendance | Overall record | Big East record |
|---|---|---|---|---|---|---|---|---|---|---|
| February 22 | vs. Missouri | No. 19 | Maestri Field at Privateer Park • New Orleans, Louisiana | W 7–6 | | | | | 1–0 | – |
| February 23 | at New Orleans | No. 19 | Maestri Field at Privateer Park • New Orleans, Louisiana | L 7–8 | | | | | 1–1 | – |
| February 24 | vs. Southern Illinois | No. 19 | Maestri Field at Privateer Park • New Orleans, Louisiana | L 2–6 | | | | | 1–2 | – |

March (11–8)

| Date | Opponent | Rank | Site/stadium | Score | Win | Loss | Save | Attendance | Overall record | Big East record |
|---|---|---|---|---|---|---|---|---|---|---|
| March 1 | vs. Duquesne | No. 24 | Homestead Sports Complex • Homestead, Florida | W 6–0 | | | | | 2–2 | – |
| March 2 | vs. Fairfield | No. 24 | Homestead Sports Complex • Homestead, Florida | W 6–4 | | | | | 3–2 | – |
| March 2 | vs. FIU | No. 24 | Homestead Sports Complex • Homestead, Florida | L 4–13 | | | | | 3–3 | – |
| March 3 | vs. Sacred Heart | No. 24 | Homestead Sports Complex • Homestead, Florida | W 4–1 | | | | | 4–3 | – |
| March 8 | vs. TCU | No. 24 | Dell Diamond • Round Rock, Texas | L 3–7 | | | | | 4–4 | – |
| March 9 | vs. USC | No. 24 | Dell Diamond • Round Rock, Texas | W 15–8 | | | | | 5–4 | – |
| March 10 | vs. Texas–Pan American | No. 24 | Dell Diamond • Round Rock, Texas | L 5–6 | | | | | 5–5 | – |
| March 11 | vs. Creighton | | Dell Diamond • Round Rock, Texas | L 6–8 | | | | | 5–6 | – |
| March 13 | vs. Creighton | | Nelson W. Wolff Municipal Stadium • San Antonio, Texas | W 6–2 | | | | | 6–6 | – |
| March 14 | vs. Southern Illinois | | Nelson W. Wolff Municipal Stadium • San Antonio, Texas | W 5–3 | | | | | 7–6 | – |
| March 15 | vs. Arkansas–Little Rock | | Nelson W. Wolff Municipal Stadium • San Antonio, Texas | W 7–5 | | | | | 8–6 | – |
| March 16 | vs. Southern Illinois | | Nelson W. Wolff Municipal Stadium • San Antonio, Texas | W 3–2 | | | | | 9–6 | – |
| March 23 | at Connecticut | | J. O. Christian Field • Storrs, Connecticut | L 3–4 | | | | | 9–7 | 0–1 |
| March 23 | at Connecticut | | J. O. Christian Field • Storrs, Connecticut | L 8–9 | | | | | 9–8 | 0–2 |
| March 24 | at Connecticut | | J. O. Christian Field • Storrs, Connecticut | L 6–13 | | | | | 9–9 | 0–3 |
| March 28 | at West Virginia | | Hawley Field • Morgantown, West Virginia | L 2–4 | | | | | 9–10 | 0–4 |
| March 28 | at West Virginia | | Hawley Field • Morgantown, West Virginia | W 10–6 | | | | | 10–10 | 1–4 |
| March 30 | at Georgetown | | Shirley Povich Field • Bethesda, Maryland | W 10–6 | | | | | 11–10 | 2–4 |
| March 30 | at Georgetown | | Shirley Povich Field • Bethesda, Maryland | W 12–3 | | | | | 12–10 | 3–4 |

April (19–2)

| Date | Opponent | Rank | Site/stadium | Score | Win | Loss | Save | Attendance | Overall record | Big East record |
|---|---|---|---|---|---|---|---|---|---|---|
| April 1 | BYU | | Frank Eck Stadium • Notre Dame, Indiana | W 1–0 | | | | | 13–10 | 3–4 |
| April 3 | Valparaiso | | Frank Eck Stadium • Notre Dame, Indiana | W 16–0 | | | | | 14–10 | 3–4 |
| April 3 | Valparasio | | Frank Eck Stadium • Notre Dame, Indiana | W 12–1 | | | | | 15–10 | 3–4 |
| April 6 | St. John's | | Frank Eck Stadium • Notre Dame, Indiana | W 4–1 | | | | | 16–10 | 4–4 |
| April 6 | St. John's | | Frank Eck Stadium • Notre Dame, Indiana | L 3–4 | | | | | 16–11 | 4–5 |
| April 7 | St. John's | | Frank Eck Stadium • Notre Dame, Indiana | W 5–2 | | | | | 17–11 | 5–5 |
| April 9 | Western Michigan | | Frank Eck Stadium • Notre Dame, Indiana | W 5–4 | | | | | 18–11 | 5–5 |
| April 11 | Pittsburgh | | Frank Eck Stadium • Notre Dame, Indiana | L 5–7 | | | | | 18–12 | 5–6 |
| April 11 | Pittsburgh | | Frank Eck Stadium • Notre Dame, Indiana | W 12–2 | | | | | 19–12 | 6–6 |
| April 12 | Virginia Tech | | Frank Eck Stadium • Notre Dame, Indiana | W 2–1 | | | | | 20–12 | 7–6 |
| April 12 | Virginia Tech | | Frank Eck Stadium • Notre Dame, Indiana | W 4–2 | | | | | 21–12 | 8–6 |
| April 15 | Central Michigan | | Frank Eck Stadium • Notre Dame, Indiana | W 10–9 | | | | | 22–12 | 7–6 |
| April 16 | Ball State | | Frank Eck Stadium • Notre Dame, Indiana | W 10–1 | | | | | 23–12 | 7–6 |
| April 17 | Toledo | | Frank Eck Stadium • Notre Dame, Indiana | W 15–4 | | | | | 24–12 | 8–6 |
| April 20 | at Seton Hall | | Owen T. Carroll Field • South Orange, New Jersey | W 9–4 | | | | | 25–12 | 9–6 |
| April 21 | at Seton Hall | | Owen T. Carroll Field • South Orange, New Jersey | W 4–2 | | | | | 26–12 | 10–6 |
| April 21 | at Seton Hall | | Owen T. Carroll Field • South Orange, New Jersey | W 6–1 | | | | | 27–12 | 11–6 |
| April 23 | Chicago State | | Frank Eck Stadium • Notre Dame, Indiana | W 9–8 | | | | | 28–12 | 11–6 |
| April 24 | Bowling Green | | Frank Eck Stadium • Notre Dame, Indiana | W 3–2 | | | | | 29–12 | 11–6 |
| April 26 | No. 30 Arizona State | | Frank Eck Stadium • Notre Dame, Indiana | W 11–5 | | | | | 30–12 | 11–6 |
| April 30 | vs. Michigan | No. 19 | Fifth Third Ballpark • Grand Rapids, Michigan | W 7–4 | | | | | 31–12 | 11–6 |

May (10–2)

| Date | Opponent | Rank | Site/stadium | Score | Win | Loss | Save | Attendance | Overall record | Big East record |
|---|---|---|---|---|---|---|---|---|---|---|
| May 1 | Oakland | No. 19 | Frank Eck Stadium • Notre Dame, Indiana | W 11–5 | | | | | 32–12 | 11–6 |
| May 4 | Rutgers | No. 19 | Frank Eck Stadium • Notre Dame, Indiana | W 6–5 | | | | | 33–12 | 12–6 |
| May 4 | Rutgers | No. 19 | Frank Eck Stadium • Notre Dame, Indiana | W 7–2 | | | | | 34–12 | 13–6 |
| May 5 | Rutgers | No. 19 | Frank Eck Stadium • Notre Dame, Indiana | L 0–11 | | | | | 34–13 | 13–7 |
| May 11 | at Villanova | No. 19 | Richie Ashburn Field • Philadelphia, Pennsylvania | L 7–8 | | | | | 34–14 | 13–8 |
| May 12 | at Villanova | No. 19 | Richie Ashburn Field • Philadelphia, Pennsylvania | W 8–1 | | | | | 35–14 | 14–8 |
| May 12 | at Villanova | No. 19 | Richie Ashburn Field • Philadelphia, Pennsylvania | W 9–5 | | | | | 36–14 | 15–8 |
| May 15 | Rochester | No. 23 | Frank Eck Stadium • Notre Dame, Indiana | W 10–3 | | | | | 37–14 | 15–8 |
| May 15 | Detroit | No. 23 | Frank Eck Stadium • Notre Dame, Indiana | W 23–1 | | | | | 38–14 | 15–8 |
| May 17 | Boston College | No. 23 | Frank Eck Stadium • Notre Dame, Indiana | W 8–2 | | | | | 39–14 | 16–8 |
| May 18 | Boston College | No. 23 | Frank Eck Stadium • Notre Dame, Indiana | W 10–6 | | | | | 40–14 | 17–8 |
| May 18 | Boston College | No. 23 | Frank Eck Stadium • Notre Dame, Indiana | W 5–2 | | | | | 41–14 | 18–8 |

Postseason
Big East Tournament (3–1)

| Date | Opponent | Seed/Rank | Site/stadium | Score | Win | Loss | Save | Attendance | Overall record | BIGET record |
|---|---|---|---|---|---|---|---|---|---|---|
| May 23 | vs. (4) Rutgers | (1) No. 18 | Commerce Bank Ballpark • Bridgewater, New Jersey | W 8–3 | | | | | 42–14 | 1–0 |
| May 24 | vs. (2) Virginia Tech | (1) No. 18 | Commerce Bank Ballpark • Bridgewater, New Jersey | W 8–4 | | | | | 43–14 | 2–0 |
| May 25 | vs. (4) Rutgers | (1) No. 18 | Commerce Bank Ballpark • Bridgewater, New Jersey | L 3–4 | | | | | 43–15 | 2–1 |
| May 23 | vs. (4) Rutgers | (1) No. 18 | Commerce Bank Ballpark • Bridgewater, New Jersey | W 3–2 | | | | | 44–15 | 3–1 |

NCAA tournament: South Bend Regional (3–0)

| Date | Opponent | Seed/Rank | Site/stadium | Score | Win | Loss | Save | Attendance | Overall record | NCAAT record |
|---|---|---|---|---|---|---|---|---|---|---|
| May 31 | (3) No. 30 Ohio State | (2) No. 17 | Frank Eck Stadium • Notre Dame, Indiana | W 8–6 | | | | | 45–15 | 1–0 |
| June 1 | (1) No. 20 South Alabama | (2) No. 17 | Frank Eck Stadium • Notre Dame, Indiana | W 25–1 | | | | | 46–15 | 2–0 |
| June 2 | (3) No. 30 Ohio State | (2) No. 17 | Frank Eck Stadium • Notre Dame, Indiana | W 9–6 | | | | | 47–15 | 3–0 |

NCAA tournament: Tallahassee Super Regional (2–1)

| Date | Opponent | Seed/Rank | Site/stadium | Score | Win | Loss | Save | Attendance | Overall record | NCAAT record |
|---|---|---|---|---|---|---|---|---|---|---|
| June 7 | at (1) No. 1 Florida State | No. 11 | Dick Howser Stadium • Tallahassee, Florida | W 10–4 | | | | | 48–15 | 4–0 |
| June 9 | at (1) No. 1 Florida State | No. 11 | Dick Howser Stadium • Tallahassee, Florida | L 5–12 | | | | | 48–16 | 4–1 |
| June 10 | at (1) No. 1 Florida State | No. 11 | Dick Howser Stadium • Tallahassee, Florida | W 3–1 | | | | | 49–16 | 5–1 |

College World Series (1–2)

| Date | Opponent | Seed/Rank | Site/stadium | Score | Win | Loss | Save | Attendance | Overall record | NCAAT record |
|---|---|---|---|---|---|---|---|---|---|---|
| June 15 | vs. (8) No. 5 Stanford | No. 8 | Johnny Rosenblatt Stadium • Omaha, Nebraska | L 3–4 | | | | | 49–17 | 18–8 |
| June 17 | vs. (4) No. 1 Rice | No. 8 | Johnny Rosenblatt Stadium • Omaha, Nebraska | W 5–3 | | | | | 50–17 | 18–8 |
| June 18 | vs. (8) No. 5 Stanford | No. 8 | Johnny Rosenblatt Stadium • Omaha, Nebraska | L 3–5 | | | | | 50–18 | 18–8 |

All rankings from Collegiate Baseball.

== South Bend Regional ==
South Bend Regional Teams
| (1) South Alabama Jaguars | (2) Notre Dame Fighting Irish | (3) Ohio State Buckeyes | (4) Kent State Golden Flashes |

First round
1 | South Alabama | 7
4 | Kent State | 4
3 | Ohio State | 6
2 | Notre Dame | 8
Lower round 1
4 | Kent State | 8
3 | Ohio State | 12

Regional semifinals
1 | South Alabama | 1
2 | Notre Dame | 25
Lower final
3 | Ohio State | 6
1 | South Alabama | 4

Regional final
2 | Notre Dame | 9 | —
3 | Ohio State | 6 | —

== Tallahassee Super Regional ==
Tallahassee Super Regional Game 1
| (11) Notre Dame Fighting Irish | vs. | (1) Florida State Seminoles |

June 7, 2002, 6:00 pm (EST) at Dick Howser Stadium in Tallahassee, Florida
| Team | 1 | 2 | 3 | 4 | 5 | 6 | 7 | 8 | 9 | R | H | E |
|---|---|---|---|---|---|---|---|---|---|---|---|---|
| (11) Notre Dame | 2 | 0 | 1 | 0 | 0 | 1 | 2 | 4 | 0 | 10 | 0 | 0 |
| (1) Florida State | 0 | 0 | 1 | 2 | 0 | 1 | 0 | 0 | 0 | 4 | 0 | 0 |

Tallahassee Super Regional Game 2
| (1) Florida State Seminoles | vs. | (11) Notre Dame Fighting Irish |

June 9, 2002, 12:30 pm (EST) at Dick Howser Stadium in Tallahassee, Florida
| Team | 1 | 2 | 3 | 4 | 5 | 6 | 7 | 8 | 9 | R | H | E |
|---|---|---|---|---|---|---|---|---|---|---|---|---|
| (1) Florida State | 8 | 0 | 0 | 2 | 1 | 0 | 0 | 0 | 1 | 12 | 0 | 0 |
| (11) Notre Dame | 4 | 0 | 0 | 0 | 0 | 0 | 0 | 1 | 0 | 5 | 0 | 0 |

Tallahassee Super Regional Game 3
| (1) Florida State Seminoles | vs. | (11) Notre Dame Fighting Irish |

June 10, 2002, 11:00 am (EST) at Dick Howser Stadium in Tallahassee, Florida
| Team | 1 | 2 | 3 | 4 | 5 | 6 | 7 | 8 | 9 | R | H | E |
|---|---|---|---|---|---|---|---|---|---|---|---|---|
| (1) Florida State | 0 | 0 | 0 | 0 | 0 | 0 | 0 | 1 | 0 | 1 | 0 | 0 |
| (11) Notre Dame | 0 | 0 | 1 | 1 | 0 | 0 | 2 | 0 | 0 | 4 | 0 | 0 |
Attendance: 5,195

== College World Series ==
College World Series Teams
| Notre Dame Fighting Irish | (2) Clemson Tigers | Georgia Tech Yellow Jackets | (4) Rice Owls | (5) Texas Longhorns | (6) South Carolina Gamecocks | Nebraska Cornhuskers | (8) Stanford Cardinal |

First round
Notre Dame | 3
8 | Stanford | 4
5 | Texas | 2
4 | Rice | 1
Notre Dame | 5
4 | Rice | 3
2 | Clemson | 11
Nebraska | 10
6 | South Carolina | 0
Georgia Tech | 11
Nebraska | 8
6 | South Carolina | 10

Second round
8 | Stanford | 7
5 | Texas | 8
Notre Dame | 3
8 | Stanford | 5
2 | Clemson | 9
Georgia Tech | 7
6 | South Carolina | 9
Georgia Tech | 5

Semifinals
5 | Texas | 6 | —
8 | Stanford | 5 | —
2 | Clemson | 4 | 2
6 | South Carolina | 12 | 10

Finals
5 | Texas | 12
6 | South Carolina | 6

== Awards and honors ==
Matt Bok

- Third Team All-Big East Conference

Andrew Bushey

- Third Team All-Big East Conference

Grant Johnson

- First Freshman All-American Collegiate Baseball Newspaper
- Second Freshman Team All-American Baseball America

Paul O'Toole

- Second Team All-Big East Conference

Steve Sollmann

- Second Team All-Big East Conference

Steve Stanley

- First Team All-American American Baseball Coaches Association
- First Team All-American Baseball America
- First Team All-American National Collegiate Baseball Writers Association
- First Team All-American Collegiate Baseball Newspaper
- First Team All-American USA Today
- Big East Conference Player of the Year
- Big East Conference Tournament MVP
- First Team All-Big East Conference
- College World Series All-Tournament Team

Brian Stavisky

- Second Team All-Big East Conference
