= Tim Parenton =

American baseball coach (1961–2023)

Biographical details
- Born: December 11, 1961; New Orleans, Louisiana, U.S.
- Died: October 30, 2023 (aged 61)

Playing career
- Football
- 1980–1983: Mississippi State
- Baseball
- 1982–1984: Mississippi State

Coaching career (HC unless noted)
- 1985–1987: Mississippi State (GA)
- 1990–1994: Old Dominion (asst.)
- 1995–1997: Mississippi State (asst.)
- 1998–2004: Samford
- 2005–2007: Florida (asst.)
- 2008–2010: New Orleans (LA) Jesuit
- 2011–2013: North Florida (asst.)
- 2014–2017: Hudson Valley Renegades
- 2018–2023: North Florida

Head coaching record
- Overall: 259–363
- Tournaments: OVC: 2–2; ASUN: 7–7; NCAA: 0–0

Accomplishments and honors

Awards
- Ohio Valley Coach of the Year (2004)

Timothy Michael Parenton (December 11, 1961 – October 30, 2023) was an American college baseball coach and third baseman. He played college baseball and college football at Mississippi State University. He then served as the head coach of the Samford Bulldogs (1998–2004) and the North Florida Ospreys (2018–2023).

== Playing career ==
Parenton attended Jesuit High School in New Orleans, Louisiana. Parenton played for the school's varsity baseball and football teams all four years in addition to lettering in two other sports. Parenton then enrolled at the Mississippi State University, to play college football for the Mississippi State Bulldogs football team. He appeared in the 1980 Sun Bowl as a reserve quarterback, rushing for −4 yards on two attempts. Parenton would spend another season as a reserve quarterback for the Bulldogs before giving up football.

Parenton then pursued baseball full-time and was a 3-year letter winner for the Mississippi State Bulldogs baseball team.

== Coaching career ==
Parenton began his coaching career immediately after college as a graduate assistant for his alma mater Mississippi State.

After stepping away from college baseball, Parenton returned as an assistant coach for the Old Dominion Monarchs baseball program where he worked under his former colleague, Pat McMahon. After 5 years as an assistant, Parenton was up for the head coaching job at Old Dominion, but eventually lost out to Tony Guzzo. Parenton returned to Mississippi State as an assistant in 1995 through 1997.

In 1997, Parenton was hired to lead the Samford Bulldogs baseball program. The Bulldogs struggled under Parenton, never finishing over .500 and only qualifying for the conference tournament twice. Despite this, Parenton was named the 2004 Ohio Valley Conference Coach of the Year. On July 15, 2004, Parenton stepped down from his post at Samford to become an assistant coach at Florida.

On August 10, 2007, Parenton returned to Jesuit High School as the school's baseball coach. On April 22, 2010, it was announced that Parenton would complete the season with Jesuit, but then return to college baseball as an assistant with the North Florida Ospreys baseball team.

After three years as an assistant at North Florida, Parenton accepted his first professional challenge as the manager of the Hudson Valley Renegades of the Tampa Bay Rays organization. Parenton guided the Renegades to the 2017 New York–Penn League Championship in 2017.

On June 5, 2017, Parenton was named the third head coach in North Florida history. On May 30, 2023, Parenton stepped down as the head coach of the Ospreys due to health concerns.

== Death ==
Parenton died from throat cancer on October 30, 2023, just 5 months after his resignation from UNF, at the age of 61.

== Head coaching record ==
Record table
Season	Team	Overall	Conference	Standing	Postseason
Samford Bulldogs (Trans America Athletic/ASUN Conference) (1998–2003)
1998	Samford	13–43	6–14	4th (West)	
1999	Samford	20–33	8–22	10th	
2000	Samford	29–34	6–21	10th	
2001	Samford	20–34	12–15	7th	
2002	Samford	27–31	13–17	6th	Atlantic Sun Tournament
2003	Samford	17–34	7–23	11th	
Samford:			52–112		
Samford Bulldogs (Ohio Valley Conference) (2004)
2004	Samford	25–33	15–12	6th	Ohio Valley Tournament
Samford:		151-242	15-12		
North Florida Ospreys (ASUN Conference) (2018–2023)
2018	North Florida	28–28	13–11	4th	Atlantic Sun Tournament
2019	North Florida	32–25	12–11	5th	Atlantic Sun Tournament
2020	North Florida	4–12			Season canceled on March 12 due to Coronavirus pandemic
2021	North Florida	22–23	11–7	2nd (South)	ASUN Tournament
2022	North Florida	22–33	11–18	5th (East)	ASUN Tournament
2023	North Florida	28–27	13–17	11th	
North Florida:		136–121	47–47		
Total:		259–363			
National champion Postseason invitational champion Conference regular season champion Conference regular season and conference tournament champion Division regular season champion Division regular season and conference tournament champion Conference tournament champion
