= 2002 Big East Conference baseball tournament =

American college baseball tournament

- Teams: 4
- Format: Double-elimination tournament
- Finals site: Commerce Bank Ballpark; Bridgewater, New Jersey
- Champions: Notre Dame (1st title)
- Winning coach: Paul Mainieri (1st title)
- MVP: Steve Stanley (Notre Dame)

2002 Big East Conference baseball standings
	Conf.						Overall
Team	W		L		T	PCT	W		L		T	PCT
No. 6 Notre Dame ‍†‍‡‍^{y}	18	–	8	–	0	.692	50	–	18	–	0	.735
Virginia Tech ‍‍‍	18	–	8	–	0	.692	33	–	26	–	0	.559
Boston College ‍‍‍	15	–	11	–	0	.577	30	–	25	–	0	.545
Rutgers ‍‍‍	15	–	11	–	0	.577	25	–	22	–	0	.532
Pittsburgh ‍‍‍	14	–	11	–	0	.560	36	–	16	–	1	.689
St. John's ‍‍‍	14	–	12	–	0	.538	29	–	23	–	0	.558
Connecticut ‍‍‍	13	–	12	–	0	.520	28	–	22	–	0	.560
Villanova ‍‍‍	12	–	13	–	0	.480	30	–	23	–	0	.566
Seton Hall ‍‍‍	11	–	15	–	0	.423	25	–	28	–	0	.472
West Virginia ‍‍‍	9	–	16	–	0	.360	24	–	26	–	0	.480
Georgetown ‍‍‍	2	–	24	–	0	.077	9	–	47	–	0	.161
† – Conference champion ‡ – Tournament champion y – Invited to the NCAA tournament As of June 30, 2002; Rankings from Collegiate Baseball

The 2002 Big East Conference baseball tournament was held at Commerce Bank Ballpark in Bridgewater, New Jersey. This was the eighteenth annual Big East Conference baseball tournament. The Notre Dame Fighting Irish won their first tournament championship and claimed the Big East Conference's automatic bid to the 2002 NCAA Division I baseball tournament. Notre Dame would go on to win five championships in a row.

== Format and seeding ==
The Big East baseball tournament was a 4 team double elimination tournament in 2002. The top four regular season finishers were seeded one through four based on conference winning percentage only.

Team	W	L	Pct.	GB	Seed
Notre Dame	18	8	.692	–	1
Virginia Tech	18	8	.692	–	2
Boston College	15	11	.577	3	3
Rutgers	15	11	.577	3	4
Pittsburgh	14	11	.560	3.5	–
St. John's	14	12	.538	4	–
Connecticut	13	12	.520	4.5	–
Villanova	12	13	.480	5.5	–
Seton Hall	11	15	.423	7	–
West Virginia	9	16	.360	8.5	–
Georgetown	2	24	.077	16	–

== Bracket ==
Upper round 1
1	Notre Dame	8
4	Rutgers	3
2	Virginia Tech	2
3	Boston College	1
Lower round 1
4	Rutgers	4
3	Boston College	3

Upper final
1	Notre Dame	8
2	Virginia Tech	4
Lower final
2	Virginia Tech	2
4	Rutgers	6

Final
1	Notre Dame
4	Rutgers

* - Indicates game required 10 innings.

== Jack Kaiser Award ==
Steve Stanley was the winner of the 2002 Jack Kaiser Award. Stanley was a senior center fielder for Notre Dame.
