= 2002 South Carolina Gamecocks baseball team =

American college baseball season

2002 South Carolina Gamecocks baseball

SEC Champions SEC Eastern Division Champions Columbia Regional Champions Columbia Super Regional Champions

College World Series, Runner-Up
- Conference: Southeastern Conference
- Eastern Division
- Record: 57–18 (21–8 SEC)
- Head coach: Ray Tanner (6th season)
- Assistant coaches: Jim Toman (6th season); Jerry Meyers (6th season); Stuart Lake (4th season)
- Home stadium: Sarge Frye Field

2002 Southeastern Conference baseball standings
	Conf.				Overall
Team	W		L	PCT	W		L	PCT
Eastern
No. 2 South Carolina ^{x}‍†‍‍^{y}	21	–	8	.724	53	–	16	.768
No. 20 Florida ‍‍‍^{y}	20	–	10	.667	46	–	19	.708
Georgia ‍‍‍^{y}	15	–	15	.500	32	–	29	.525
Tennessee ‍‍‍	12	–	18	.400	27	–	28	.491
Vanderbilt ‍‍‍	7	–	21	.250	24	–	27	.471
Kentucky ‍‍‍	6	–	24	.200	17	–	36	.321
Western
No. 16 Alabama ^{x}‍‍‡‍^{y}	20	–	10	.667	51	–	15	.773
No. 11 LSU ‍‍‍^{y}	19	–	10	.655	44	–	22	.667
Auburn ‍‍‍^{y}	15	–	15	.500	34	–	26	.567
Mississippi State ‍‍‍	14	–	15	.483	34	–	24	.586
No. 18 Arkansas ‍‍‍^{y}	13	–	14	.481	35	–	28	.556
Ole Miss ‍‍‍	14	–	16	.467	37	–	19	.661
x – Division champion † – Conference champion ‡ – Tournament champion y – Invited to the NCAA tournament As of June 30, 2002; Rankings from Collegiate Baseball

The 2002 South Carolina Gamecocks baseball team represented the University of South Carolina in the 2002 NCAA Division I baseball season. The Gamecocks played their home games at the new Sarge Frye Field. The team was coached by Ray Tanner in his 6th season at South Carolina.

The Gamecocks lost the College World Series, defeated by the Texas Longhorns in the championship game.

== Roster ==
2002 South Carolina Gamecocks roster
Pitchers: 50 Tony Adler; 16 Gary Bell; 30 Rico Bravo; 13 Steven Bondurant; 3 Matt Campbell; 12 Cliff Donald; 33 Rocky Evans; 28 Chris Hernandez; 36 David Marchbanks; 14 Aaron Rawl; 8 Tim Seaton; 25 Chris Spigner; 42 Blake Taylor; 20 John Wesley; 34 Steven Whetstone; 46 Matt Wilson	Catchers: 26 Jared Greenwood; 10 Landon Powell; Infielders: 18 Brian Buscher; 17 Trey Dyson; 7 Drew Meyer; 27 Kevin Melillo; 32 Yaron Peters; 45 Demetric Smith; 44 Adam Tolman	Outfielders: 4 Jon Coutlangus; 22 Garris Gonce; 5 Justin Harris; 47 Kyle Pope; 11 Matt Riddle; 39 Jason Ross; 15 Steve Thomas

== Schedule and results ==
Legend
South Carolina win
South Carolina loss
South Carolina tie

2002 South Carolina Gamecocks baseball game log (57–18)
Regular season (44–12)
February (9–0)

Date	Opponent	Rank	Site/stadium	Score	Overall Record	SEC Record
February 8	Charleston Southern	No. 8	Sarge Frye Field • Columbia, SC	W 11–3	1–0	–
February 9	Charleston Southern	No. 8	Sarge Frye Field • Columbia, SC	W 19–1	2–0	–
February 10	Charleston Southern	No. 8	Sarge Frye Field • Columbia, SC	W 3–2	3–0	–
February 15	East Tennessee State	No. 5	Sarge Frye Field • Columbia, SC	W 14–2	4–0	–
February 16	East Tennessee State	No. 5	Sarge Frye Field • Columbia, SC	W 7–4	5–0	–
February 17	East Tennessee State	No. 5	Sarge Frye Field • Columbia, SC	W 14–5	6–0	–
February 22	vs. VCU	No. 5	Coastal Federal Field • Myrtle Beach, SC	W 5–3	7–0	–
February 23	vs. No. 17 Georgia Tech	No. 5	Coastal Federal Field • Myrtle Beach, SC	W 8–3	8–0	–
February 24	vs. Coastal Carolina	No. 5	Coastal Federal Field • Myrtle Beach, SC	W 11–2	9–0	–

March (14–6)

Date	Opponent	Rank	Site/stadium	Score	Overall Record	SEC Record
March 2	No. 3 Clemson	No. 4	Sarge Frye Field • Columbia, SC	L 7–9	9–1	–
March 3	at No. 3 Clemson	No. 4	Beautiful Tiger Field • Clemson, SC	L 10–11	9–2	–
March 5	UNC Asheville	No. 4	Sarge Frye Field • Columbia, SC	W 10–4	10–2	–
March 6	William & Mary	No. 4	Sarge Frye Field • Columbia, SC	W 6–5	11–2	–
March 8	Seton Hall	No. 4	Sarge Frye Field • Columbia, SC	W 5–1	12–2	–
March 9	Seton Hall	No. 4	Sarge Frye Field • Columbia, SC	W 6–2	13–2	–
March 10	Seton Hall	No. 4	Sarge Frye Field • Columbia, SC	W 10–5	14–2	–
March 12	Purdue	No. 4	Sarge Frye Field • Columbia, SC	W 15–2	15–2	–
March 13	Davidson	No. 4	Sarge Frye Field • Columbia, SC	W 15–0	16–2	–
March 15	at No. 23 Mississippi State	No. 4	Dudy Noble Field • Starkville, MS	L 4–12	16–3	0–1
March 16	at No. 23 Mississippi State	No. 4	Dudy Noble Field • Starkville, MS	W 5–3	17–3	1–1
March 17	at No. 23 Mississippi State	No. 4	Dudy Noble Field • Starkville, MS	W 9–6	18–3	2–1
March 20	Wofford	No. 4	Sarge Frye Field • Columbia, SC	W 15–6	19–3	2–1
March 22	No. 6 Florida	No. 4	Sarge Frye Field • Columbia, SC	W 2–1	20–3	3–1
March 23	No. 6 Florida	No. 4	Sarge Frye Field • Columbia, SC	L 5–14	20–4	3–2
March 24	No. 6 Florida	No. 4	Sarge Frye Field • Columbia, SC	W 6–4	21–4	4–2
March 27	at The Citadel	No. 3	Joseph P. Riley Jr. Park • Charleston, SC	L 1–5	21–5	4–2
March 29	No. 5 Alabama	No. 3	Sarge Frye Field • Columbia, SC	L 6–10	21–6	4–3
March 30	No. 5 Alabama	No. 3	Sarge Frye Field • Columbia, SC	W 9–6	22–6	5–3
March 31	No. 5 Alabama	No. 3	Sarge Frye Field • Columbia, SC	W 4–3	23–6	6–3

April (11–4)

Date	Opponent	Rank	Site/stadium	Score	Overall Record	SEC Record
April 3	Wofford	No. 4	Sarge Frye Field • Columbia, SC	W 11–0	24–6	6–3
April 5	at Arkansas	No. 4	Baum–Walker Stadium • Fayetteville, AR	L 4–7	24–7	6–4
April 6	at Arkansas	No. 4	Baum–Walker Stadium • Fayetteville, AR	L 7–8	24–8	6–5
April 10	The Citadel	No. 7	Sarge Frye Field • Columbia, SC	W 2–0	25–8	6–5
April 12	at Vanderbilt	No. 7	Hawkins Field • Nashville, TN	W 7–5	26–8	7–5
April 13	at Vanderbilt	No. 7	Hawkins Field • Nashville, TN	W 10–1	27–8	8–5
April 14	at Vanderbilt	No. 7	Hawkins Field • Nashville, TN	W 20–13	28–8	9–5
April 17	at No. 1 Clemson	No. 7	Beautiful Tiger Field • Clemson, SC	W 8–6	29–8	9–5
April 19	No. 27 LSU	No. 7	Sarge Frye Field • Columbia, SC	L 8–9	29–9	9–6
April 20	No. 27 LSU	No. 7	Sarge Frye Field • Columbia, SC	W 4–2	30–9	10–6
April 21	No. 27 LSU	No. 7	Sarge Frye Field • Columbia, SC	W 4–3	31–9	11–6
April 24	No. 1 Clemson	No. 6	Sarge Frye Field • Columbia, SC	L 1–4	31–10	11–6
April 26	at Kentucky	No. 6	Cliff Hagan Stadium • Lexington, KY	W 6–4	32–10	12–6
April 28	at Kentucky	No. 6	Cliff Hagan Stadium • Lexington, KY	W 6–4	33–10	13–6
April 28	at Kentucky	No. 6	Cliff Hagan Stadium • Lexington, KY	W 12–6	34–10	14–6

May (10–2)

Date	Opponent	Rank	Site/stadium	Score	Overall Record	SEC Record
May 1	at Wofford	No. 4	Duncan Park • Spartanburg, SC	W 5–4	35–10	14–6
May 3	No. 9 Ole Miss	No. 4	Sarge Frye Field • Columbia, SC	W 17–12	36–10	15–6
May 4	No. 9 Ole Miss	No. 4	Sarge Frye Field • Columbia, SC	W 6–4	37–10	16–6
May 5	No. 9 Ole Miss	No. 4	Sarge Frye Field • Columbia, SC	L 2–4	37–11	16–7
May 10	Tennessee	No. 5	Sarge Frye Field • Columbia, SC	W 10–6	38–11	17–7
May 11	Tennessee	No. 5	Sarge Frye Field • Columbia, SC	L 7–8	38–12	17–8
May 12	Tennessee	No. 5	Sarge Frye Field • Columbia, SC	W 5–3	39–12	18–8
May 14	at Charleston Southern	No. 5	CSU Ballpark • Charleston, SC	W 16–4	40–12	18–8
May 15	vs. Furman	No. 5	CSU Ballpark • Charleston, SC	W 14–0	41–12	18–8
May 17	Georgia	No. 5	Foley Field • Athens, GA	W 11–9	42–12	19–8
May 18	Georgia	No. 5	Foley Field • Athens, GA	W 12–4	43–12	19–8
May 19	Georgia	No. 5	Foley Field • Athens, GA	W 4–2	44–12	20–8

Postseason (13–6)
SEC Tournament (4–2)

Date	Opponent	Seed/Rank	Site/stadium	Score	Overall Record	SECT Record
May 22	vs. (8) Arkansas	(1) No. 4	Hoover Metropolitan Stadium • Hoover, AL	W 10–1	45–12	1–0
May 23	vs. (4) No. 10 LSU	(1) No. 4	Hoover Metropolitan Stadium • Hoover, AL	L 2–8	45–13	1–1
May 24	vs. (8) Arkansas	(1) No. 4	Hoover Metropolitan Stadium • Hoover, AL	W 6–2	46–13	2–1
May 25	vs. (4) No. 10 LSU	(1) No. 4	Hoover Metropolitan Stadium • Hoover, AL	W 10–8	47–13	3–1
May 25	vs. (4) No. 10 LSU	(1) No. 4	Hoover Metropolitan Stadium • Hoover, AL	W 5–4	48–13	4–1
May 26	vs. (2) No. 7 Alabama	(1) No. 4	Hoover Metropolitan Stadium • Hoover, AL	L 2–6	48–14	4–2

Columbia Regional (3–1)

Date	Opponent	Seed/Rank	Site/stadium	Score	Overall Record	NCAAT Record
May 31	(4) VCU	(1) No. 5	Sarge Frye Field • Columbia, SC	W 6–3	49–14	1–0
June 1	(2) No. 14 North Carolina	(1) No. 5	Sarge Frye Field • Columbia, SC	W 9–6	50–14	2–0
June 2	(2) No. 14 North Carolina	(1) No. 5	Sarge Frye Field • Columbia, SC	L 4–8	50–15	2–1
June 2	(2) No. 14 North Carolina	(1) No. 5	Sarge Frye Field • Columbia, SC	W 3–1	51–15	3–1

Columbia Super Regional (2–1)

Date	Opponent	Seed/Rank	Site/stadium	Score	Overall Record	NCAAT Record
June 7	No. 17 Miami (FL)	(6) No. 4	Sarge Frye Field • Columbia, SC	W 10–7	52–15	4–1
June 8	No. 17 Miami (FL)	(6) No. 4	Sarge Frye Field • Columbia, SC	L 2–5	52–16	4–2
June 9	No. 17 Miami (FL)	(6) No. 4	Sarge Frye Field • Columbia, SC	W 6–4	53–16	5–2

2002 College World Series (4–2)

Date	Opponent	Seed/Rank	Site/stadium	Score	Overall Record	CWS Record
June 14	vs. No. 6 Georgia Tech	(6) No. 3	Rosenblatt Stadium • Omaha, NE	L 0–11	53–17	0–1
June 16	vs. No. 7 Nebraska	(6) No. 3	Rosenblatt Stadium • Omaha, NE	W 10–8	54–17	1–1
June 18	vs. No. 6 Georgia Tech	(6) No. 3	Rosenblatt Stadium • Omaha, NE	W 9–5	55–17	2–1
June 19	vs. (2) No. 4 Clemson	(6) No. 3	Rosenblatt Stadium • Omaha, NE	W 12–4	56–17	3–1
June 21	vs. (2) No. 4 Clemson	(6) No. 3	Rosenblatt Stadium • Omaha, NE	W 10–2	57–17	4–1
June 22	vs. (5) No. 2 Texas	(6) No. 3	Rosenblatt Stadium • Omaha, NE	L 6–12	57–18	4–2

Schedule Source:

== Awards and honors ==
Justin Harris

- All Tournament Team

Landon Powell

- All Tournament Team

== Gamecocks in the 2002 MLB draft ==
The following members of the South Carolina Gamecocks baseball program were drafted in the 2002 Major League Baseball draft.

Round	Pick	Player	Position	MLB Club
1	10	Drew Meyer	SS	Texas Rangers
10	305	Yaron Peters	1B	Atlanta Braves
10	306	Gary Bell	P	New York Yankees
31	942	Garris Gonce	OF	St. Louis Cardinals
39	1,174	Blake Taylor	P	Cleveland Indians
