= 2002 Atlantic Sun Conference baseball tournament =

American college baseball tournament

- Teams: 6
- Format: Double-elimination
- Finals site: Melching Field at Conrad Park; DeLand, FL
- Champions: UCF (6th title)
- Winning coach: Jay Bergman (6th title)
- MVP: Matt Myers (UCF)

2002 Atlantic Sun Conference baseball standings
	Conf.				Overall
Team	W		L	PCT	W		L	PCT
UCF ‍†‍‡‍^{y}	23	–	7	.767	41	–	22	.651
No. 15 Florida Atlantic ‍‍‍^{y}	22	–	8	.733	46	–	21	.687
Stetson ‍‍‍^{y}	19	–	9	.679	42	–	19	.689
Troy State ‍‍‍	16	–	14	.533	28	–	30	.483
Jacksonville ‍‍‍	15	–	15	.500	27	–	31	.466
Samford ‍‍‍	13	–	17	.433	27	–	31	.466
Mercer ‍‍‍	13	–	17	.433	22	–	32	.407
Georgia State ‍‍‍	13	–	17	.433	24	–	32	.429
Campbell ‍‍‍	13	–	17	.433	19	–	38	.333
Jacksonville State ‍‍‍	9	–	20	.310	23	–	31	.426
Belmont ‍‍‍	9	–	20	.310	22	–	30	.423
† – Conference champion ‡ – Tournament champion y – Invited to the NCAA tournament As of June 30, 2002; Rankings from Collegiate Baseball

The 2002 Atlantic Sun Conference baseball tournament was held at Melching Field at Conrad Park on the campus of Stetson University in DeLand, Florida, from May 22 through 25. UCF won its sixth and final tournament championship to earn the Atlantic Sun Conference's automatic bid to the 2002 NCAA Division I baseball tournament.

== Seeding ==
The top six teams (based on conference results) from the conference earn invites to the tournament.

Team	W	L	PCT	GB	Seed
UCF	23	7	.767	—	1
Florida Atlantic	22	8	.733	1	2
Stetson	19	9	.679	3	3
Troy State	16	14	.533	7	4
Jacksonville	15	15	.500	8	5
Samford	13	17	.433	10	6
Mercer	13	17	.433	10	—
Georgia State	13	17	.433	10	—
Campbell	11	19	.367	12	—
Jacksonville State	9	20	.310	13.5	—
Belmont	9	20	.310	13.5	—

== Results ==
First round
1	UCF	7
6	Samford	5
3	Stetson	7
4	Troy State	6
2	Florida Atlantic	4
5	Jacksonville	2

Second round
1	UCF
4	Troy State
3	Stetson	3
2	Florida Atlantic	0
6	Samford	6
5	Jacksonville	11

Third round
1	UCF	13
3	Stetson	6
2	Florida Atlantic	6
5	Jacksonville	4

Semifinals
3	Stetson	3
2	Florida Atlantic	10

Final
1	UCF	8	—
2	Florida Atlantic	3	—

== All-Tournament Team ==
The following players were named to the All-Tournament Team.

Pos	Name	Team
P	Justin Pope	UCF
P	Danny Core	Florida Atlantic
P	Roger Lincoln	Stetson
P	V D Stertzbach	UCF
RP	Andy Wilson	Stetson
IF	Mike Cox	Florida Atlantic
IF	Mike Myers	UCF
OF	Gabe Somaribba	Florida Atlantic
OF	Clay Timpner	UCF
OF	Phil Nover	Jacksonville
OF	Ty Hanson	UCF
OF	Robert Orton	Florida Atlantic

=== Tournament Most Valuable Player ===
Mike Myers was named Tournament Most Valuable Player. Myers was an infielder for UCF.
