= 2002 Arizona Wildcats baseball team =

American college baseball season

2002 Arizona Wildcats baseball
- Conference: Pacific-10 Conference
- Record: 31-24 (9-15 Pac-10)
- Head coach: Andy Lopez (1st season)
- Assistant coaches: Mark Wasikowski (1st season); Jeff Casper (1st season); Steve Kling (1st season)
- Home stadium: Sancet Stadium

2002 Pacific-10 Conference baseball standings
	Conf.						Overall
Team	W		L		T	PCT	W		L		T	PCT
No. 12 Southern California ‍†‍‍^{y}	17	–	7	–	0	.708	37	–	24	–	0	.607
No. 4 Stanford ‍‍‍^{y}	16	–	8	–	0	.667	47	–	18	–	0	.723
No. 26 Arizona State ‍‍‍^{y}	15	–	6	–	0	.714	37	–	27	–	0	.578
Washington ‍‍‍^{y}	15	–	9	–	0	.625	33	–	27	–	1	.549
California ‍‍‍	11	–	13	–	0	.458	29	–	27	–	0	.518
Oregon State ‍‍‍	10	–	14	–	0	.417	31	–	23	–	0	.574
UCLA ‍‍‍	9	–	15	–	0	.375	26	–	35	–	0	.426
Arizona ‍‍‍	9	–	15	–	0	.375	31	–	24	–	0	.564
Washington State ‍‍‍	6	–	18	–	0	.250	21	–	33	–	0	.389
† – Conference champion y – Invited to the NCAA tournament As of June 30, 2002; Rankings from Collegiate Baseball

The 2002 Arizona Wildcats baseball team represented the University of Arizona during the 2002 NCAA Division I baseball season. The Wildcats played their home games at Frank Sancet Stadium. The team was coached by Andy Lopez in his 1st season at Arizona. Former head coach Jerry Stitt - who had been spent the previous 23 seasons on the coaching staff (the last 5 as head coach) - resigned prior to the season. The Wildcats finished with a record of 31-24 and placed 8th in the Pacific-10 Conference with 9-15 record.

== Previous season ==
The Wildcats finished the 2001 season with an overall record of 33-23. They finished 5th in conference play with a record of 12-12. Arizona missed the postseason for a 2nd straight year and 4th time in Jerry Stitt's 5 seasons as head coach.

== Personnel ==
=== Roster ===
2002 Arizona Wildcats baseball roster
Pitchers • 2 - Joe Little - Sophomore • 11 - Chris Marini - Freshman • 12 - Sean Rierson - Sophomore • 13 - Will Miller - Freshman • 18 - Jason Snyder - Freshman • 20 - Kevin Rupprecht - Sophomore • 22 - Marc Kaiser - Sophomore • 24 - Chris Goodman - Sophomore • 29 - Scott Burns - Sophomore • 36 - Tony Sulser - Freshman • 45 - Wes Zlotoff - Junior • 46 - Matt Wersel - Junior • 47 - Kevin Sears - Senior	Catchers • 26 - Ken Riley - Junior • 33 - Richard Mercado - Freshman • 40 - Chris Cunningham - Senior Infielders • 3 - Moises Duran - Sophomore • 4 - Greg Powers - Junior • 10 - Brad Hassey - Senior • 17 - Pat Reilly - Sophomore • 34 - John Hardy - Freshman • 42 - Will Thompson - Freshman	Outfielders • 1 - Clarence Farmer - Junior • 16 - Jeff Van Houten - Freshman • 21 - Chris Frey - Freshman • 27 - Brian Anderson - Sophomore • 21 - Clayton Bried - Senior Utility • 23 - Justyn St. Claire - Senior

=== Coaches ===
2002 Arizona Wildcats baseball coaching staff
- Andy Lopez - Head coach
- Mark Wasikowski - Assistant coach
- Jeff Casper - Assistant coach
- Steve Kling - Volunteer Assistant Coach

=== Opening day ===
Opening Day Starters
Name	Position
Brad Hassey	Shortstop
Will Thompson	First baseman
Brian Anderson	Center fielder
Chris Cunningham	Catcher
Marc Kaiser	Left fielder
Moises Duran	Second baseman
Richard Mercado	Designated hitter
John Hardy	Third baseman
Clayton Bried	Right fielder
Sean Rierson	Starting pitcher

== Schedule and results ==
2002 Arizona Wildcats baseball game log
Regular season
Date	Opponent	Rank	Site/Stadium	Score	Win/Loss	Overall Record	Pac-10 Record
Jan 25	New Mexico		Sancet Stadium • Tucson, AZ	W 6-2	Rierson (1-0)	1-0	
Jan 26	New Mexico		Sancet Stadium • Tucson, AZ	W 23-3	Little (1-0)	2-0	
Jan 27	New Mexico		Sancet Stadium • Tucson, AZ	W 8-2	Kaiser (1-0)	3-0	
Feb 1	Utah		Sancet Stadium • Tucson, AZ	W 3-0	Rierson (2-0)	4-0	
Feb 2	Utah		Sancet Stadium • Tucson, AZ	W 17-5	Little (2-0)	5-0	
Feb 3	Utah		Sancet Stadium • Tucson, AZ	L 5-7	Sulser (0-1)	5-1	
Feb 4	Southern Utah		Sancet Stadium • Tucson, AZ	W 10-1	Goodman (1-0)	6-1	
Feb 5	Southern Utah		Sancet Stadium • Tucson, AZ	W 11-8	Wersel (1-0)	7-1	
Feb 7	San Diego State		Sancet Stadium • Tucson, AZ	W 1-0	Rierson (3-0)	8-1	
Feb 8	San Diego State		Sancet Stadium • Tucson, AZ	W 6-3	Little (3-0)	9-1	
Feb 9	San Diego State		Sancet Stadium • Tucson, AZ	W 7-5	Kaiser (2-0)	10-1	
Feb 13	at Texas A&M-Corpus Christi		Islander Field • Corpus Christi, TX	W 4-1	Miller (1-0)	11-1	
Feb 15	at Texas A&M		Olsen Field • College Station, TX	L 0-4	Rierson (3-1)	11-2	
Feb 16	at Texas A&M		Olsen Field • College Station, TX	L 4-9	Little (3-1)	11-3	
Feb 17	at Texas A&M		Olsen Field • College Station, TX	L 6-13	Goodman (1-1)	11-4	
Feb 22	UC Irvine		Sancet Stadium • Tucson, AZ	W 14-4	Snyder (1-0)	12-4	
Feb 23	UC Irvine		Sancet Stadium • Tucson, AZ	W 7-6	Sulser (1-1)	13-4	
Feb 24	UC Irvine		Sancet Stadium • Tucson, AZ	W 13-9	Zlotoff (1-0)	14-4	
Feb 26	New Mexico State		Sancet Stadium • Tucson, AZ	W 14-10	Kaiser (3-0)	15-4	
Mar 2	Cal State Dominguez Hills		Sancet Stadium • Tucson, AZ	W 12-1	Rierson (4-1)	16-4	
Mar 3	Cal State Dominguez Hills		Sancet Stadium • Tucson, AZ	W 13-4	Little (4-1)	17-4	
Mar 8	at Long Beach State		Blair Field • Long Beach, CA	L 0-4	Rierson (4-2)	17-5	
Mar 9	at Long Beach State		Blair Field • Long Beach, CA	L 6-7	Sulser (1-2)	17-6	
Mar 10	at Long Beach State		Blair Field • Long Beach, CA	L 0-6	Kaiser (3-1)	17-7	
Mar 15	UNC Wilmington		Sancet Stadium • Tucson, AZ	L 7-9	Goodman (1-2)	17-8	
Mar 16	UNC Wilmington		Sancet Stadium • Tucson, AZ	W 9-6	Little (5-1)	18-8	
Mar 17	UNC Wilmington		Sancet Stadium • Tucson, AZ	W 14-2	Kaiser (4-1)	19-8	
Mar 22	#20 Arizona State		Sancet Stadium • Tucson, AZ	L 7-9	Anderson (0-1)	19-9	0-1
Mar 23	#20 Arizona State		Sancet Stadium • Tucson, AZ	L 6-10	Little (5-2)	19-10	0-2
Mar 24	#20 Arizona State		Sancet Stadium • Tucson, AZ	W 10-1	Kaiser (5-1)	20-10	1-2
Mar 28	at Oregon State		Goss Stadium • Corvallis, OR	W 13-9	Rierson (5-2)	21-10	2-2
Mar 29	at Oregon State		Goss Stadium • Corvallis, OR	L 1-2	Zlotoff (1-1)	21-11	2-3
Mar 30	at Oregon State		Goss Stadium • Corvallis, OR	L 0-5	Kaiser (5-2)	21-12	2-4
Apr 5	#2 Stanford		Sancet Stadium • Tucson, AZ	L 4-5	Snyder (1-1)	21-13	2-5
Apr 6	#2 Stanford		Sancet Stadium • Tucson, AZ	L 1-19	Little (5-3)	21-14	2-6
Apr 7	#2 Stanford		Sancet Stadium • Tucson, AZ	W 15-13	Goodman (2-2)	22-14	3-6
Apr 12	at California		Evans Diamond • Berkeley, CA	W 8-4	Rierson (6-2)	23-14	4-6
Apr 13	at California		Evans Diamond • Berkeley, CA	W 18-9	Goodman (2-2)	24-14	5-6
Apr 14	at California		Evans Diamond • Berkeley, CA	L 1-2	Little (5-4)	24-15	5-7
Apr 16	Grand Canyon		Sancet Stadium • Tucson, AZ	W 17-8	Sulser (2-2)	25-15	
Apr 19	UC Riverside		Sancet Stadium • Tucson, AZ	W 5-1	Rierson (7-2)	26-15	
Apr 20	UC Riverside		Sancet Stadium • Tucson, AZ	L 5-12	Kaiser (5-3)	26-16	
Apr 21	UC Riverside		Sancet Stadium • Tucson, AZ	W 13-5	Little (6-4)	27-16	
Apr 26	at #23 USC		Dedeaux Field • Los Angeles, CA	L 6-14	Rierson (7-3)	27-17	5-8
Apr 27	at #23 USC		Dedeaux Field • Los Angeles, CA	L 10-12	Kaiser (5-4)	27-18	5-9
Apr 28	at #23 USC		Dedeaux Field • Los Angeles, CA	W 15-12	Sulser (3-2)	28-18	6-9
May 10	UCLA		Sancet Stadium • Tucson, AZ	W 10-9	Zlotoff (2-1)	29-18	7-9
May 11	UCLA		Sancet Stadium • Tucson, AZ	L 3-5	Little (6-5)	29-19	7-10
May 12	UCLA		Sancet Stadium • Tucson, AZ	L 14-18	Sulser (3-3)	29-20	7-11
May 17	Washington State		Sancet Stadium • Tucson, AZ	L 5-6	Rierson (7-4)	29-21	7-12
May 18	Washington State		Sancet Stadium • Tucson, AZ	W 8-7	Goodman (4-2)	30-21	8-12
May 19	Washington State		Sancet Stadium • Tucson, AZ	L 7-9	Anderson (0-2)	30-22	8-13
May 24	at Washington		Husky Ballpark • Seattle, WA	L 3-7	Rierson (7-5)	30-23	8-14
May 25	at Washington		Husky Ballpark • Seattle, WA	L 3-8	Little (6-6)	30-24	8-15
May 26	at Washington		Husky Ballpark • Seattle, WA	W 5-2	Goodman (5-2)	31-24	9-15

== 2002 MLB draft ==
Player	Position	Round	Overall	MLB team
Chris Cunningham	C	13	373	Pittsburgh Pirates
Brad Hassey	SS	19	566	Toronto Blue Jays
Sean Rierson	RHP	26	787	San Francisco Giants
