= 2002 Florida Gators baseball team =

American college baseball season

2002 Florida Gators baseball

Gainesville Regional, 3–2
- Conference: Southeastern Conference

Ranking
- Coaches: No. 15
- CB: No. 20
- Record: 46–19 (20–10 SEC)
- Head coach: Pat McMahon (1st year)
- Assistant coach: John Cohen (1st year); Ross Jones (1st year)
- Home stadium: Alfred A. McKethan Stadium

2002 Southeastern Conference baseball standings
	Conf.				Overall
Team	W		L	PCT	W		L	PCT
Eastern
No. 2 South Carolina ^{x}‍†‍‍^{y}	21	–	8	.724	53	–	16	.768
No. 20 Florida ‍‍‍^{y}	20	–	10	.667	46	–	19	.708
Georgia ‍‍‍^{y}	15	–	15	.500	32	–	29	.525
Tennessee ‍‍‍	12	–	18	.400	27	–	28	.491
Vanderbilt ‍‍‍	7	–	21	.250	24	–	27	.471
Kentucky ‍‍‍	6	–	24	.200	17	–	36	.321
Western
No. 16 Alabama ^{x}‍‍‡‍^{y}	20	–	10	.667	51	–	15	.773
No. 11 LSU ‍‍‍^{y}	19	–	10	.655	44	–	22	.667
Auburn ‍‍‍^{y}	15	–	15	.500	34	–	26	.567
Mississippi State ‍‍‍	14	–	15	.483	34	–	24	.586
No. 18 Arkansas ‍‍‍^{y}	13	–	14	.481	35	–	28	.556
Ole Miss ‍‍‍	14	–	16	.467	37	–	19	.661
x – Division champion † – Conference champion ‡ – Tournament champion y – Invited to the NCAA tournament As of June 30, 2002; Rankings from Collegiate Baseball

The 2002 Florida Gators baseball team represented the University of Florida in the sport of baseball during the 2002 college baseball season. The Gators competed in Division I of the National Collegiate Athletic Association (NCAA) and the Eastern Division of the Southeastern Conference (SEC). They played their home games at Alfred A. McKethan Stadium, on the university's Gainesville, Florida campus. The team was the first at Florida coached by Pat McMahon.

== Roster ==
2002 Florida Gators baseball team
Players
Coaches

#	Pos.	Name	B/T	Height	Weight	Year	Home town
47	RHP	David Bartelt	R/R	6 ft 1 in (1.85 m)	192 lb (87 kg)	Fr	Odessa, FL
6	INF	Stephen Barton (redshirt)	L/R	5 ft 9 in (1.75 m)	176 lb (80 kg)	Fr	Miami, FL
32	LHP	Matt Bomeisl	L/L	5 ft 10 in (1.78 m)	171 lb (78 kg)	So	Miami, FL
48	RHP	Tommy Boss	R/R	6 ft 2 in (1.88 m)	210 lb (95 kg)	Fr	Dunnellon, FL
54	OF	Daniel Brooks	R/R	5 ft 11 in (1.8 m)	202 lb (92 kg)	Fr	Tampa, FL
49	RHP	Kevin Coleman	R/R	6 ft 0 in (1.83 m)	203 lb (92 kg)	Sr	Marietta, GA
7	OF	Jeff Corsaletti	L/R	5 ft 11 in (1.8 m)	186 lb (84 kg)	Fr	Port Charlotte, FL
42	C	Chris Craine	R/R	6 ft 0 in (1.83 m)	194 lb (88 kg)	Fr	Gainesville, FL
28	INF	Matt Cresap	R/R	5 ft 11 in (1.8 m)	160 lb (73 kg)	Jr	Tallahassee, FL
2	INF	Aaron Davidson	R/R	5 ft 9 in (1.75 m)	168 lb (76 kg)	Sr	Atascadero, CA
15	RHP	Scot Drucker	R/R	6 ft 1 in (1.85 m)	192 lb (87 kg)	So	Miami, FL
23	RHP	Connor Falkenbach	R/R	5 ft 10 in (1.78 m)	174 lb (79 kg)	Fr	Parkland, FL
3	RHP	Matt Foster	R/R	6 ft 0 in (1.83 m)	182 lb (83 kg)	Jr	Sarasota, FL
22	C	Mario Garza	L/R	5 ft 11 in (1.8 m)	202 lb (92 kg)	Jr	Melbourne, FL
34	LHP	Jamie Goldfarb	R/L	5 ft 11 in (1.8 m)	175 lb (79 kg)	Jr	Merritt Island, FL
9	OF	Matt Goss	L/L	5 ft 9 in (1.75 m)	183 lb (83 kg)	Sr	Bartow, FL
18	OF	Ben Harrison	R/R	6 ft 3 in (1.91 m)	203 lb (92 kg)	So	Key West, FL
21	RHP	Alex Hart	R/R	6 ft 5 in (1.96 m)	212 lb (96 kg)	Jr	Marion, PA
45	RHP	Ben Hedgecock	R/R	6 ft 4 in (1.93 m)	202 lb (92 kg)	Jr	Tampa, FL
4	OF	Bobby Hicks	L/R	6 ft 0 in (1.83 m)	183 lb (83 kg)	Jr	Keystone Heights, FL
10	LHP	Ryan Kennedy	R/L	5 ft 11 in (1.8 m)	175 lb (79 kg)	Fr	Bradenton, FL
17	INF	Mark Kiger	R/R	5 ft 11 in (1.8 m)	177 lb (80 kg)	Sr	La Jolla, CA
16	OF	David Klebonis	R/R	5 ft 11 in (1.8 m)	201 lb (91 kg)	Sr	Orlando, FL
5	INF	Matt Maley	L/R	6 ft 1 in (1.85 m)	172 lb (78 kg)	So	Miami, FL
33	C	Joe Mercadante	R/R	5 ft 11 in (1.8 m)	190 lb (86 kg)	Jr	Gainesville, FL
31	RHP	Mike Mlotkowski	R/R	6 ft 5 in (1.96 m)	212 lb (96 kg)	So	Fairfax Station, VA
24	INF	Pat Osborn	R/R	6 ft 3 in (1.91 m)	207 lb (94 kg)	Jr	Bakersfield, CA
27	LHP	Mike Pete	L/L	5 ft 10 in (1.78 m)	172 lb (78 kg)	Fr	Brandon, FL
25	LHP	Tom Potter	L/L	6 ft 1 in (1.85 m)	184 lb (83 kg)	So	Naples, FL
29	LHP	Keith Ramsey	L/L	6 ft 0 in (1.83 m)	174 lb (79 kg)	Sr	Los Angeles, CA
36	LHP	Jimmy Ramshaw	L/L	6 ft 4 in (1.93 m)	200 lb (91 kg)	Sr	Canberra, AUS
13	OF	Jake Riordan	R/R	6 ft 0 in (1.83 m)	172 lb (78 kg)	Jr	Gainesville, FL
55	C	Brian Rose	R/R	6 ft 1 in (1.85 m)	234 lb (106 kg)	Jr	Miami, FL
20	RHP	Pat Rumble	R/R	5 ft 10 in (1.78 m)	180 lb (82 kg)	Fr	Jacksonville, FL
40	RHP	Ryan Sadowski	R/R	6 ft 3 in (1.91 m)	190 lb (86 kg)	Fr	Davie, FL
43	INF	Ryan Shealy	R/R	6 ft 5 in (1.96 m)	245 lb (111 kg)	Sr	Fort Lauderdale, FL
12	INF	C.J. Smith	R/R	6 ft 3 in (1.91 m)	181 lb (82 kg)	Fr	Tampa, FL
14	INF	Aaron Sobieraj	R/R	6 ft 1 in (1.85 m)	188 lb (85 kg)	Jr	Clearwater, FL
44	OF	Wes Swackhamer	L/L	6 ft 1 in (1.85 m)	207 lb (94 kg)	Fr	Basking Ridge, NJ
1	INF	Jonathan Tucker	R/R	5 ft 7 in (1.7 m)	161 lb (73 kg)	Fr	El Sobrante, CA
8	INF	Ben Zeskind	S/R	5 ft 11 in (1.8 m)	173 lb (78 kg)	Fr	Miami, FL

Head coach

Pat McMahon

Assistant coach(es)

John Cohen
Ross Jones

Legend

- (C) Team captain
- (S) Suspended
- (I) Ineligible
- Injured
- Current redshirt

Roster

== Schedule ==
2002 Florida Gators baseball game log (46–19)
Regular season (40–15)
February (11–0)

Date	Opponent	Rank	Stadium Site	Score	Win	Loss	Save	Attendance	Overall Record	SEC Record
February 2	Charleston Southern	No. 21	McKethan Stadium	W 25–1	Ramsey (1–0)	Viars (0–1)	None	1,904	1–0	–
February 3	Charleston Southern	No. 21	McKethan Stadium	W 12–2	Hart (1–0)	Holmen (0–1)	None	1,855	2–0	–
February 6	Mercer	No. 21	McKethan Stadium	W 11–6	Pete (1–0)	Morrison (0–2)	None	1,133	3–0	–
February 8	at No. 7 Miami (FL); Rivalry	No. 21	Mark Light Stadium; Coral Gables, FL	W 12–9	Drucker (1–0)	Vazquez (0–1)	None	3,513	4–0	–
February 10	at No. 7 Miami (FL); Rivalry	No. 21	Mark Light Stadium	W 6–2	Hart (2–0)	Bengochea (0–2)	Ramshaw (1)	3,267	5–0	–
February 13	Florida A&M	No. 14	McKethan Stadium	W 11–5	Pete (2–0)	Sills (1–1)	None	1,070	6–0	–
February 16	Winthrop	No. 14	McKethan Stadium	W 12–11	Goldfarb (1–0)	Cheek (0–1)	None	1,831	7–0	–
February 17	Winthrop	No. 14	McKethan Stadium	W 8–4	Hart (3–0)	Reeves (1–1)	Coleman (1)	1,794	8–0	–
February 20	Savannah State	No. 11	McKethan Stadium	W 14–0	Ramshaw (1–0)	Castillo (4–2)	None	1,164	9–0	–
February 24	Siena	No. 11	McKethan Stadium	W 12–2	Hart (4–0)	Knoff (0–2)	None	1,605	10–0	–
February 27	Siena	No. 6	McKethan Stadium	W 31–3	Bartelt (1–0)	Copskey (0–2)	None	780	11–0	–

March (13–6)

Date	Opponent	Rank	Stadium Site	Score	Win	Loss	Save	Attendance	Overall Record	SEC Record
March 1	No. 2 Florida State; Rivalry	No. 6	McKethan Stadium	L 4–5	Lynch (1–0)	Goldfarb (0–1)	Roman (7)	4,246	11–1	–
March 3	at No. 2 Florida State; Rivalry	No. 6	Dick Howser Stadium; Tallahassee, FL	L 4–9	Lynch (2–0)	Coleman (0–1)	None	4,150	11–2	–
March 7	Austin Peay	No. 6	McKethan Stadium	L 8–12	Callaway (1–0)	Bartelt (1–1)	None	889	11–3	–
March 8	Austin Peay	No. 6	McKethan Stadium	W 17–2	Hart (5–0)	Pew (1–1)	None	1,033	12–3	–
March 9	Austin Peay	No. 6	McKethan Stadium	W 13–4	Ramsey (2–0)	Mathews (1–1)	None	1,702	13–3	–
March 12	College of Charleston	No. 6	McKethan Stadium	W 20–3	Bartelt (2–1)	Wentzky (2–3)	None	1,075	14–3	–
March 13	College of Charleston	No. 6	McKethan Stadium	W 23–8	Potter (1–0)	McLeod (0–1)	None	1,144	15–3	–
March 15	No. 10 Ole Miss	No. 6	McKethan Stadium	W 24–5	Ramshaw (2–0)	Montrenes (4–1)	None	2,011	16–3	1–0
March 16	No. 10 Ole Miss	No. 6	McKethan Stadium	W 7–6	Hart (6–0)	Pickens (3–1)	Coleman (2)	4,638	17–3	2–0
March 17	No. 10 Ole Miss	No. 6	McKethan Stadium	W 17–6	Ramsey (3–0)	Horne (0–1)	None	1,972	18–3	3–0
March 19	Massachusetts	No. 6	McKethan Stadium	W 15–3	Foster (1–0)	Ratliff (1–1)	None	703	19–3	–
March 20	Dartmouth	No. 6	McKethan Stadium	W 9–1	Pete (3–0)	Velosky (0–1)	None	1,343	20–3	–
March 22	at No. 4 South Carolina	No. 6	Sarge Frye Field; Columbia, SC	L 1–2	Bell (5–1)	Ramshaw (2–1)	Taylor (5)	2,242	20–4	3–1
March 23	at No. 4 South Carolina	No. 6	Sarge Frye Field	W 14–5	Hart (7–0)	Marchbanks (5–2)	None	4,123	21–4	4–1
March 24	at No. 4 South Carolina	No. 6	Sarge Frye Field	L 4–6	Bondurant (3–0)	Ramsey (3–1)	Taylor (6)	3,898	21–5	4–2
March 26	Army	No. 7	McKethan Stadium	W 17–1	Sadowski (1–0)	Kashner (1–1)	None	2,015	22–5	–
March 29	No. 23 Auburn	No. 7	McKethan Stadium	L 3–8	Speigner (6–2)	Ramshaw (2–2)	Dueitt (3)	3,486	22–6	4–3
March 30	No. 23 Auburn	No. 7	McKethan Stadium	W 9–5	Hart (8–0)	Hughey (1–1)	None	2,833	23–6	5–3
March 31	No. 23 Auburn	No. 7	McKethan Stadium	W 6–1	Ramsey (4–1)	Paxton (6–2)	Coleman (3)	1,627	24–6	6–3

April (8–7)

Date	Opponent	Rank	Stadium Site	Score	Win	Loss	Save	Attendance	Overall Record	SEC Record
April 3	at Jacksonville	No. 7	Alexander Brest Field; Jacksonville, FL	L 2–7	Regas (2–5)	Foster (1–1)	None	2,178	24–7	–
April 5	at No. 5 Alabama	No. 7	Sewell–Thomas Stadium; Tuscaloosa, AL	L 1–4	Cormier (8–0)	Ramshaw (2–3)	None	5,285	24–8	6–4
April 6	at No. 5 Alabama	No. 7	Sewell–Thomas Stadium	L 2–7	Norris (2–0)	Hart (8–1)	Reed (6)	5,478	24–9	6–5
April 7	at No. 5 Alabama	No. 7	Sewell–Thomas Stadium	L 5–6	Tankersley (5–2)	Coleman (0–2)	None	5,201	24–10	6–6
April 9	Stetson	No. 12	McKethan Stadium	L 3–6	Blair (3–1)	Boss (0–1)	Lincoln (4)	1,955	24–11	–
April 12	at Tennessee	No. 12	Lindsey Nelson Stadium; Knoxville, TN	W 15–1	Ramshaw (3–3)	Riley (2–2)	None	1,607	25–11	7–6
April 13	at Tennessee	No. 12	Lindsey Nelson Stadium	W 8–5^{10}	Coleman (1–2)	Terrell (2–6)	None	2,555	26–11	8–6
April 14	at Tennessee	No. 12	Lindsey Nelson Stadium	L 5–6	Johnson (2–0)	Ramsey (4–2)	Terrell (4)	937	26–12	8–7
April 17	Bethune–Cookman	No. 11	McKethan Stadium	W 5–4	Bartelt (3–1)	Johnson (1–4)	Coleman (4)	1,106	27–12	–
April 19	Vanderbilt	No. 11	McKethan Stadium	W 13–7	Bartelt (4–1)	Sowers (3–5)	Goldfarb (1)	2,351	28–12	9–7
April 20	Vanderbilt	No. 11	McKethan Stadium	W 8–7	Hart (9–1)	Maultsby (0–3)	Boss (1)	1,912	29–12	10–7
April 21	Vanderbilt	No. 11	McKethan Stadium	W 7–3	Ramsey (5–2)	Little (4–5)	Goldfarb (2)	1,803	30–12	11–7
April 26	Georgia	No. 11	McKethan Stadium	W 12–6	Ramshaw (4–3)	Westphal (3–2)	Boss (2)	3,540	31–12	12–7
April 27	Georgia	No. 11	McKethan Stadium	W 12–9	Hart (10–1)	Sharpton (5–4)	Bartelt (1)	3,512	32–12	13–7
April 28	Georgia	No. 11	McKethan Stadium	L 4–6	Carswell (4–3)	Goldfarb (1–2)	None	2,517	32–13	13–8

May (8–2)

Date	Opponent	Rank	Stadium Site	Score	Win	Loss	Save	Attendance	Overall Record	SEC Record
May 3	at Mississippi State	No. 12	Dudy Noble Field; Starkville, MS	W 5–4	Bartelt (5–1)	Maholm (8–2)	Coleman (5)	6,562	33–13	14–8
May 4	at Mississippi State	No. 12	Dudy Noble Field	W 5–3	Hart (11–1)	Brock (6–4)	Goldfarb (3)	6,234	34–13	15–8
May 5	at Mississippi State	No. 12	Dudy Noble Field	W 4–0	Ramsey (6–2)	Collums (3–5)	None	3,074	35–13	16–8
May 7	South Florida	No. 10	McKethan Stadium	W 10–9	Goldfarb (2–2)	Livingston (1–2)	None	1,506	36–13	–
May 10	No. 25 LSU	No. 10	McKethan Stadium	L 4–5^{10}	Tompkins (5–0)	Goldfarb (2–3)	None	3,470	36–14	16–9
May 11	No. 25 LSU	No. 10	McKethan Stadium	W 6–3	Hart (12–1)	Wilson (7–4)	Goldfarb (4)	3,486	37–14	17–9
May 12	No. 25 LSU	No. 10	McKethan Stadium	L 5–8	Pettit (7–6)	Ramsey (6–3)	None	2,233	37–15	17–10
May 18	at Kentucky	No. 14	Cliff Hagan Stadium; Lexington, KY	W 14–4	Hart (13–1)	Hahn (3–8)	Bartelt (2)	473	38–15	18–10
May 18	at Kentucky	No. 14	Cliff Hagan Stadium	W 18–6	Ramsey (7–3)	Corrado (1–4)	None	378	39–15	19–10
May 19	at Kentucky	No. 14	Cliff Hagan Stadium	W 5–4	Coleman (2–2)	Blanton (5–7)	None	603	40–15	20–10

Post-season (6–4)
SEC Tournament (3–2)

Date	Opponent	Seed/Rank	Stadium Site	Score	Win	Loss	Save	Attendance	Overall Record	SECT Record
May 22	vs. (6) Georgia	(3) No. 14	Metropolitan Stadium; Hoover, AL	W 7–2	Ramshaw (5–3)	Fellows (1–2)	None	–	41–15	1–0
May 23	vs. (2) No. 7 Alabama	(3) No. 14	Metropolitan Stadium	L 4–7	Cormier (10–3)	Hart (13–2)	Reed (9)	–	41–16	1–1
May 24	vs. (7) Mississippi State	(3) No. 14	Metropolitan Stadium	W 5–0	Ramsey (8–3)	Young (5–2)	None	–	42–16	2–1
May 25	vs. (2) No. 7 Alabama	(3) No. 14	Metropolitan Stadium	W 7–4	Pete (4–0)	Sanders (8–3)	Coleman (6)	10,907	43–16	3–1
May 25	vs. (2) No. 7 Alabama	(3) No. 14	Metropolitan Stadium	L 9–11	Reed (5–0)	Goldfarb (2–4)	Norris (1)	–	43–17	3–2

NCAA tournament: Gainesville Regional (3–2)

Date	Opponent	Seed/Rank	Stadium Site	Score	Win	Loss	Save	Attendance	Overall Record	Regional Record
May 31	(4) Bethune–Cookman	(1) No. 15	McKethan Stadium	W 13–1	Ramsey (9–3)	Montes (10–3)	None	2,246	44–17	1–0
June 1	(3) Miami (FL); Rivalry	(1) No. 15	McKethan Stadium	L 2–7	Bengochea (6–6)	Hart (13–3)	None	4,125	44–18	1–1
June 1	(4) Bethune–Cookman	(1) No. 15	McKethan Stadium	W 21–10	Ramshaw (6–3)	Dooley (9–6)	Falkenbach (1)	1,509	45–18	2–1
June 2	(3) Miami (FL); Rivalry	(1) No. 15	McKethan Stadium	W 11–10^{10}	Ramsey (10–3)	Huguet (6–4)	None	2,594	46–18	3–1
June 2	(3) Miami (FL); Rivalry	(1) No. 15	McKethan Stadium	L 7–8	Huguet (7–4)	Ramshaw (6–4)	None	2,533	46–19	3–2

Rankings from Collegiate Baseball. All times Eastern. Retrieved from FloridaGators.com

== See also ==
- Florida Gators
- List of Florida Gators baseball players
