= 2002 Florida Atlantic Blue Wave baseball team =

American college baseball season

2002 Florida Atlantic Owls baseball

Tuscaloosa, AL Regional Champions
- Conference: Atlantic Sun Conference

Ranking
- AP: No. 15 (Collegiate Baseball)
- Record: 46-21 (22-8 Atlantic Sun)
- Head coach: Kevin Cooney
- Home stadium: FAU Baseball Stadium

2002 Atlantic Sun Conference baseball standings
	Conf.				Overall
Team	W		L	PCT	W		L	PCT
UCF ‍†‍‡‍^{y}	23	–	7	.767	41	–	22	.651
No. 15 Florida Atlantic ‍‍‍^{y}	22	–	8	.733	46	–	21	.687
Stetson ‍‍‍^{y}	19	–	9	.679	42	–	19	.689
Troy State ‍‍‍	16	–	14	.533	28	–	30	.483
Jacksonville ‍‍‍	15	–	15	.500	27	–	31	.466
Samford ‍‍‍	13	–	17	.433	27	–	31	.466
Mercer ‍‍‍	13	–	17	.433	22	–	32	.407
Georgia State ‍‍‍	13	–	17	.433	24	–	32	.429
Campbell ‍‍‍	13	–	17	.433	19	–	38	.333
Jacksonville State ‍‍‍	9	–	20	.310	23	–	31	.426
Belmont ‍‍‍	9	–	20	.310	22	–	30	.423
† – Conference champion ‡ – Tournament champion y – Invited to the NCAA tournament As of June 30, 2002; Rankings from Collegiate Baseball

The 2002 Florida Atlantic Blue Wave baseball team was the intercollegiate baseball team of Florida Atlantic University for the 2002 NCAA baseball season. It competed on the Division I level in the Atlantic Sun Conference. The 2002 team became the first in school history to clinch a Regional championship and earn an appearance in the NCAA Super Regionals, by defeating Alabama in the Regional Championship game, 6-5.

== 2002 schedule and results ==
Date	Opponent	Location	Result	Record	Notes
May 15, 2002	vs. FIU	Boca Raton, Florida	W 17-8		
May 17, 2002	vs. Georgia State	Boca Raton, Florida	L 3-2		10 innings
May 18, 2002	vs. Georgia State	Boca Raton, Florida	L 5-4		11 innings
May 18, 2002	vs. Georgia State	Boca Raton, Florida	W 11-4		
May 22, 2002	vs. Jacksonville	DeLand, FL	W 4-2	1-0	A-Sun Tournament
May 23, 2002	vs. Stetson	DeLand, FL	L 3-0	1-1	A-Sun Tournament
May 24, 2002	vs. Jacksonville	DeLand, FL	W 6-4	2-1	A-Sun Tournament
May 24, 2002	vs. Stetson	DeLand, FL	W 10-3	3-1	A-Sun Tournament
May 25, 2002	vs. UCF	DeLand, FL	L 8-6	3-2	A-Sun Tournament Championship
May 31, 2002	vs. Auburn	Tuscaloosa, AL	W 16-11	1-0	NCAA Regional
June 1, 2002	vs. Southeast Missouri State	Tuscaloosa, AL	W 12-6	2-0	NCAA Regional
June 2, 2002	vs. Alabama	Tuscaloosa, AL	L 7-2	2-1	NCAA Regional
June 2, 2002	vs. Alabama	Tuscaloosa, AL	W 6-5	3-1	NCAA Regional Championship
June 7, 2002	vs. Georgia Tech	Atlanta, GA	L 14-3	0-1	NCAA Super Regional (Best-of-3)
June 8, 2002	vs. Georgia Tech	Atlanta, GA	L 11-5	0-2	NCAA Super Regional (Best-of-3)
* Atlantic Sun Conference games in GREEN. * Regional games in BLUE. * Super Regional games in RED.

== Regionals ==
The 2002 season saw FAU receive its third bid to the NCAA Division I Baseball Championship tournament; its first since 2000. As an at-large selection, FAU was placed in the Regional bracket with the Alabama Crimson Tide, the Auburn Tigers, and the Southeast Missouri State Indians. The top seed of the Regional was the national #3 seed, Alabama, who hosted in Tuscaloosa, AL. FAU pulled off an impressive win in the opening game against Auburn, as both underdogs in FAU and SE Missouri State, won their first games. Beating the Indians of SE Missouri State in the second round allowed FAU to roll right into the Regional championship game free of losses and avoiding the "Loser's Bracket" of the Regional. Host Alabama played itself back into the Regional by defeating Auburn and SE Missouri State, eliminating both en route to the Regional championship game. The Regional Final was set as the FAU Blue Wave and the top-seeded Alabama Crimson Tide. FAU, winning its first two games, dropped the first meeting to Alabama, 7-2, forcing a second game in the Regional Final for the championship. FAU pulled off the upset and clinched its first-ever Regional championship by defeating Alabama, 6-5. The win sent FAU to its first-ever Super Regional appearance, placing FAU in the final 16 teams.

Tuscaloosa, AL Regional
1	Alabama	4
4	SE Missouri State	7
3	Auburn	11
2	Florida Atlantic	16
Lower round 1
1	Alabama	6
3	Auburn	3

Regional
4	SE Missouri State	6
2	Florida Atlantic	12
Lower final
1	Alabama	7
2	SE Missouri State	4

Regional Final
2	Florida Atlantic	2	6
1	Alabama	7	5

== Super Regionals ==
After clinching their first-ever Regional championship, FAU moved on to the round of the final 16 - the Super Regionals. The Blue Wave faced the Georgia Tech Yellow Jackets, the #1 seed in the Super Regional bracket. FAU and Georgia Tech met at Tech's historic Russ Chandler Stadium in Atlanta, GA in a best-of-3 series, with a birth to the 2002 College World Series on the line. Unfortunately for the Blue Wave, the heavily favored and top-ranked Yellow Jackets proved to be too much, pounding the Blue Wave in a two-game sweep.

Game 1

Team	1	2	3	4	5	6	7	8	9	R	H	E
Blue Wave	0	0	0	0	0	2	1	0	3	3	9	1
Yellow Jackets	1	0	0	6	5	0	1	1	X	14	18	1
WP: Kyle Bakker (12-2) LP: Danny Core (8-6); Home runs: FAU: none GT: Parker, Remole (4th inning)

Game 2

Team	1	2	3	4	5	6	7	8	9	R	H	E
Yellow Jackets	1	0	3	2	2	0	0	0	3	11	13	1
Blue Wave	0	0	0	0	1	0	0	0	4	5	7	2
WP: Chris Goodman (8-1) LP: Chris Pillsbury (10-3); Home runs: GT: none FAU: Fiorentino (9th inning)

== Awards and honors ==
=== Freshman All-American ===
- OF Jeff Fiorentino
- 2B Derek Hutton

=== All-Conference ===
- First Team All-Atlantic Sun Honors
  - RP Tim McNab (Senior)
  - SP Danny Core (Junior)
  - SP Chris Pillsbury (Sophomore)
  - SP L.J. Biernbaum (Senior)
- Second Team All-Atlantic Sun Honors
  - 3B Mike Cox (Junior)
  - SS Bobby Spano (Senior)
- Freshman Team All-Atlantic Sun Honors
  - OF Jeff Fiorentino
  - 2B Derek Hutton

== 2002 MLB First-Year Player Draft ==
FAU players selected in the 2002 MLB First-Year Player Draft:

Player	Class	Round	Pick	Team
L.J. Biernbaum	Senior	10		San Diego
Tom McLane	Senior	19		Boston
Chris Kroski	JC Transfer Signee	19		Seattle
Nelson Lopez	Senior	22		San Francisco
Tim McNab	Senior	22		New York Mets
David Hayes	HS Signee	41		Atlanta
Jim Cooney	Junior	45		Baltimore
Gabe Somarriba	Senior	47		Baltimore
