= Drew Meyer =

American baseball player (born 1981)

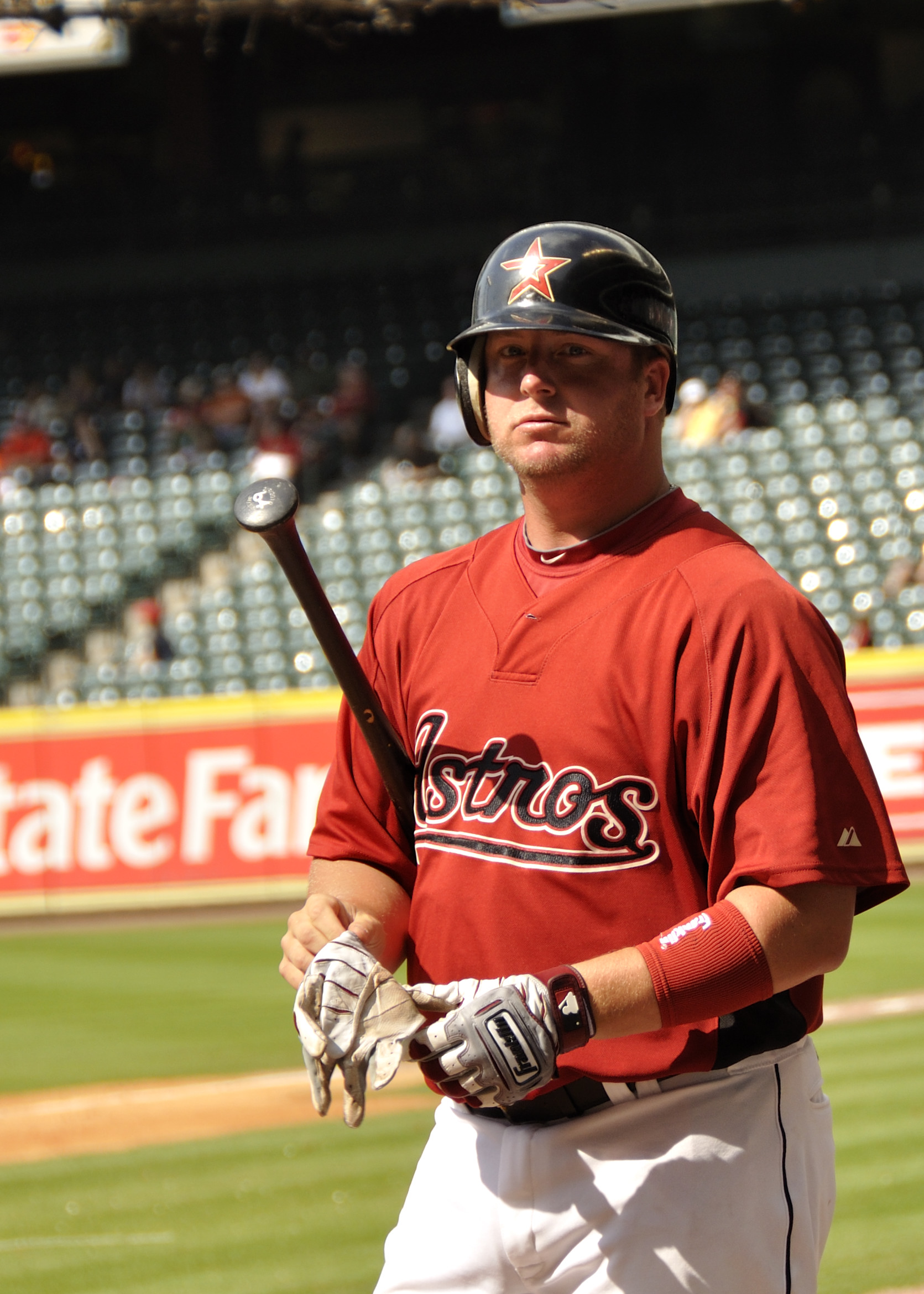
- Second baseman
- Born: August 29, 1981 (age 44); Charleston, South Carolina, U.S.
- Batted: Left Threw: Right

MLB debut
- April 21, 2006, for the Texas Rangers

Last MLB appearance
- May 9, 2006, for the Texas Rangers

MLB statistics
- Batting average: .214
- Home runs: 0
- Runs batted in: 0
- Stats at Baseball Reference

Teams
- Texas Rangers (2006)

Drew Edward Meyer (born August 29, 1981) is an American former professional baseball infielder. He played in Major League Baseball (MLB) for the Texas Rangers.

== Career ==
Meyer attended Bishop England High School in Charleston, South Carolina, as well as the University of South Carolina. In 2000 and 2001, he played collegiate summer baseball with the Chatham A's of the Cape Cod Baseball League. He was inducted into the South Carolina Athletic Hall of Fame in 2018, USC Athletic Hall of Fame in 2014 and Charleston Baseball Hall of Fame in 2013.

Meyer was the Rangers' first round pick in the 2002 Major League Baseball draft. Meyer hit .214 in his limited major league at-bats in 2006, making his major league debut on April 21 in a game against the Tampa Bay Devil Rays. He was returned to Triple-A Oklahoma, where he batted .228/.278/.305. Meyer was designated for assignment by the Texas Rangers on January 12, 2007, and was outrighted to the minor leagues after passing through league-wide waivers on January 22. As this was Meyer's first outright, he did not have the right to decline the assignment. He became a free agent at the end of the 2008 season and signed a minor league contract with the Houston Astros.

In 2011, Meyer returned to the University of South Carolina to complete his degree and serve as a student-assistant coach of the Gamecock baseball program. Meyer is now the owner of Meyer Insurance Group in Charleston SC.
