= 2002 NCAA Division I baseball rankings =

2002 NCAA Division I baseball season
- Number of teams: 286

Tournament
- Duration: May 31–June 22, 2002
- Most conference bids: SEC (7)

College World Series
- Duration: June 14–June 22, 2002
- Champions: Texas (5th title)
- Runners-up: South Carolina
- MOP: Huston Street

Seasons
- ← 2001 2003 →

The following polls make up the 2002 NCAA Division I baseball rankings. USA Today and ESPN began publishing the Coaches' Poll of 31 active coaches ranking the top 25 teams in the nation in 1992. Each coach is a member of the American Baseball Coaches Association. Baseball America began publishing its poll of the top 20 teams in college baseball in 1981. Beginning with the 1985 season, it expanded to the top 25. Collegiate Baseball Newspaper published its first human poll of the top 20 teams in college baseball in 1957, and expanded to rank the top 30 teams in 1961.

== Legend ==
	Increase in ranking
	Decrease in ranking
	Not ranked previous week
Italics	Number of first place votes
(#-#)	Win–loss record
т	Tied with team above or below also with this symbol

== USA Today/ESPN Coaches' Poll ==
Currently, only the final poll from the 2002 season is available.

Rank	Team
1	Texas
2	South Carolina
3	Clemson
4	Stanford
5	Georgia Tech
6	Rice
7	Notre Dame
8	Nebraska
9	Florida State
10	Houston
11	LSU
12	Alabama
13	Wake Forest
14	Southern California
15	Florida
16	Richmond
17	Wichita State
18	Florida Atlantic
19	Arizona State
20	Miami (FL)
21	North Carolina
22	Arkansas
23	Cal State Northridge
24	East Carolina
25	San Jose State

== Baseball America ==
Currently, only the final poll from the 2002 season is available.

Rank	Team
1	Texas
2	South Carolina
3	Clemson
4	Stanford
5	Rice
6	Notre Dame
7	Florida State
8	Georgia Tech
9	Nebraska
10	Houston
11	LSU
12	Wake Forest
13	Alabama
14	Southern California
15	Florida
16	Richmond
17	North Carolina
18	Cal State Northridge
19	Florida Atlantic
20	Miami (FL)
21	Long Beach State
22	Arizona State
23	Wichita State
24	San Jose State
25	Arkansas

== Collegiate Baseball ==
	Preseason Dec 20	Week 1 Feb 4	Week 2 Feb 11	Week 3 Feb 18	Week 4 Feb 25	Week 5 Mar 4	Week 6 Mar 11	Week 7 Mar 18	Week 8 Mar 25	Week 9 Apr 1	Week 10 Apr 8	Week 11 Apr 15	Week 12 Apr 22	Week 13 Apr 29	Week 14 May 6	Week 15 May 13	Week 16 May 20	Week 17 May 27	Week 18 June 3	Week 19 June 10	Week 20 June 24	
1.	Stanford	Stanford (2–1)	Stanford (4–2)	Stanford (6–3)	Stanford (9–4)	Stanford (12–4)	Florida State (20–4)	Florida State (24–5)	Clemson (18–1)	Clemson (23–1)	Clemson (27–2)	Clemson (30–4)	Clemson (34–5)	Clemson (38–6)	Clemson (39–7)	Clemson (42–9)	Florida State (51–12)	Florida State (56–12)	Florida State (59–12)	Rice (52–12)	Texas (57–15)	1.
2.	Florida State	Florida State (6–1)	Florida State (7–3)	Florida State (10–3)	Florida State (12–4)	Florida State (17–4)	Clemson (10–0)	Clemson (14–1)	Stanford (17–5)	Stanford (19–6)	Stanford (22–6)	Alabama (32–5)	Rice (35–8)	Rice (39–8)	Rice (39–8)	Alabama (43–9)	Wake Forest (42–9–1)	Rice (47–11)	Rice (50–12)	Texas (53–15)	South Carolina (57–18)	2.
3.	Tulane	Tulane (0–0)	LSU (3–0)	LSU (6–1)	Clemson (3–0)	Clemson (6–0)	Stanford (14–5)	Stanford (14–5)	South Carolina (21–4)	Rice (26–5)	Alabama (28–5)	Stanford (25–8)	Alabama (34–7)	Alabama (38–7)	Wake Forest (38–8)	Wake Forest (39–8)	Rice (44–11)	Texas (48–14)	Texas (51–14)	South Carolina (53–16)	Clemson (54–17)	3.
4.	Southern California	Southern California (0–0)	Clemson (0–0)	Clemson (0–0)	South Carolina (9–0)	South Carolina (9–2)	South Carolina (14–2)	South Carolina (18–3)	Rice (23–4)	South Carolina (23–6)	Rice (28–7)	Rice (31–8)	Stanford (27–10)	South Carolina (34–10)	Alabama (40–9)	Rice (41–10)	South Carolina (44–12)	Wake Forest (44–11–1)	South Carolina (51–15)	Clemson (52–15)	Stanford (47–18)	4.
5.	LSU	LSU (0–0)	South Carolina (3–0)	South Carolina (6–0)	Rice (10–1)	Rice (12–3)	Rice (15–4)	Rice (18–4)	Alabama (21–3)	Alabama (23–5)	Georgia Tech (27–4)	Wake Forest (28–6)	Wake Forest (33–6)	Texas (37–11)	South Carolina (37–11)	South Carolina (39–12)	Texas (43–13)	South Carolina (48–14)	Clemson (50–14)	Stanford (45–16)	Georgia Tech (52–16)	5.
6.	Clemson	Clemson (0–0)	Tulane (1–2)	Tulane (4–2)	Florida (10–0)	Florida (11–2)	Florida (13–3)	Florida (18–3)	Georgia Tech (18–3)	Georgia Tech (22–4)	Wake Forest (25–6)	Georgia Tech (30–5)	South Carolina (31–9)	Wake Forest (36–8)	North Carolina (35–15)	North Carolina (37–15)	Clemson (44–12)	Alabama (48–13)	Houston (47–15)	Georgia Tech (51–14)	Notre Dame (50–18)	6.
7.	Miami (FL)	Miami (FL) (2–1)	Southern California (1–2)	Wichita State (3–0)	Wichita State (5–0)	Wichita State (5–0)	Wichita State (8–1)	Wichita State (10–2)	Florida (21–5)	Florida (24–6)	South Carolina (24–8)	South Carolina (28–8)	Ole Miss (32–9)	North Carolina (32–15)	Florida State (43–12)	Florida State (48–12)	Alabama (44–12)	Clemson (47–14)	Georgia Tech (49–14)	Nebraska (47–19)	Rice (52–14)	7.
8.	South Carolina	South Carolina (0–0)	Wichita State (0–0)	Oklahoma State (4–0)	LSU (8–3)	LSU (10–4)	LSU (13–5)	Wake Forest (16–2)	Wake Forest (19–4)	Wake Forest (22–5)	Wichita State (20–7)	Wichita State (24–8)	Texas (34–10)	Florida State (41–12)	Texas (39–13)	Texas (39–13)	Houston (41–14)	Houston (44–15)	Stanford (43–16)	Notre Dame (49–16)	Nebraska (47–21)	8.
9.	Wichita State	Wichita State (0–0)	Oklahoma State (0–0)	Rice (6–1)	Texas (12–2)	Ole Miss (9–2)	Georgia Tech (13–1)	Houston (15–5)	Houston (18–7)	Houston (21–8)	Ole Miss (25–7)	Ole Miss (29–8)	North Carolina (28–14)	Ole Miss (34–11)	Stanford (32–13)	Stanford (35–14)	Georgia Tech (44–12)	Georgia Tech (46–14)	LSU (44–20)	Florida State (60–14)	Florida State (60–14)	9.
10.	Oklahoma State	Oklahoma State (0–0)	Rice (2–1)	Ole Miss (3–0)	Ole Miss (6–1)	Wake Forest (10–1)	Ole Miss (12–3)	Baylor (17–6)	Nebraska (14–7)	Wichita State (16–6)	Nebraska (21–10)	Houston (27–10)	Florida State (38–12)	Houston (32–12)	Florida (35–13)	Georgia Tech (41–11)	LSU (38–17)	Stanford (40–16)	Nebraska (45–18)	Houston (48–17)	Houston (48–17)	10.
11.	Fresno State	Rice (0–0)	Nebraska (0–0)	Florida (8–0)	Wake Forest (7–1)	Georgia Tech (9–1)	Wake Forest (13–2)	Alabama (19–2)	Florida State (26–8)	Ole Miss (21–7)	Houston (23–10)	Florida (26–12)	Florida (30–12)	Stanford (29–12)	Georgia Tech (37–10)	Houston (37–14)	North Carolina (39–17)	LSU (40–19)	Notre Dame (47–15)	LSU (44–22)	LSU (44–22)	11.
12.	Rice	Nebraska (0–0)	Ole Miss (0–0)	Wake Forest (3–1)	Tulane (7–3)	Oklahoma State (6–2)	Houston (12–4)	Georgia Tech (14–3)	Baylor (19–8)	North Carolina (19–9)	Florida (24–10)	North Carolina (25–13)	Houston (29–12)	Florida (32–13)	Ole Miss (35–13)	Wichita State (39–12)	Stanford (37–16)	Nebraska (42–18)	Southern California (36–22)	Southern California (36–24)	Southern California (36–24)	12.
13.	Nebraska	Ole Miss (0–0)	Arizona State (7–0)	Nebraska (1–2)	Oklahoma State (6–2)	Texas A&M (13–4)	Texas A&M (16–5)	Nebraska (11–5)	Wichita State (13–5)	Nebraska (17–9)	North Carolina (22–11)	Florida State (34–11)	Georgia Tech (32–8)	Georgia Tech (36–9)	Houston (34–14)	Nebraska (35–17)	Nebraska (39–17)	Wichita State (46–15)	Richmond (52–11)	Richmond (53–13)	Richmond (53–13)	13.
14.	Ole Miss	Texas (0–0)	Florida (5–0)	Cal State Fullerton (6–3)	Cal State Fullerton (9–4)	Baylor (9–5)	Baylor (12–6)	LSU (14–8)	Texas (24–6)	Florida State (28–10)	Florida State 930–11)	Texas (31–10)	Wichita State (27–10)	Wichita State (32–10)	Wichita State (36–11)	Florida (37–15)	Florida (40–15)	North Carolina (40–19)	Wake Forest (47–13–1)	Wake Forest (47–13–1)	Wake Forest (47–13–1)	14.
15.	Texas	Wake Forest (0–0)	Wake Forest (0–0)	Arizona State (7–3)	Georgia Tech (8–1)	Texas (14–4)	Arizona State (15–5)	Texas (20–6)	Ole Miss (16–7)	Texas (25–8)	Texas (28–9)	Oklahoma State (25–9)	Nebraska (26–14)	Nebraska (30–15)	Nebraska (32–17)	South Alabama (36–14)	Wichita State (42–14)	Florida (43–17)	Florida Atlantic (46–19)	Florida Atlantic (46–21)	Florida Atlantic (46–21)	15.
16.	Wake Forest	Cal State Fullerton (1–2)	Cal State Fullerton (3–3)	Miami (FL) (5–4)	Miami (FL) (8–4)	Houston (9–4)	Oklahoma State (10–3)	Ole Miss (13–6)	Texas A&M (20–10)	Texas A&M (23–10)	Texas A&M (26–11)	Texas A&M (28–13)	Oklahoma State (29–11)	Southern California (28–17)	Cal State Northridge (35–13)	Ole Miss (35–16)	Cal State Northridge (40–15)	Cal State Northridge (40–15)	Alabama (51–15)	Alabama (51–15)	Alabama (51–15)	16.
17.	Cal State Fullerton	Fresno State (1–2)	Miami (FL) (2–4)	Georgia Tech (5–0)	Texas A&M (10–2)	Nebraska (6–3)	Alabama (14–2)	Texas A&M (17–9)	Oklahoma (16–7)	Oklahoma (18–9)	Oklahoma State (22–8)	Baylor (27–12)	Cal State Fullerton (27–12)	Cal State Northridge (32–13)	Baylor (34–17)	Cal State Northridge (36–15)	Texas Tech (40–16)	Notre Dame (44–15)	Miami (FL) (33–27)	Miami (FL) (34–29)	Miami (FL) (34–29)	17.
18.	Baylor	Baylor (0–0)	Georgia Tech (2–0)	Texas (7–2)	Arizona State (8–5)	Arizona State (11–5)	East Carolina (13–1)	Oklahoma (15–5)	Cal State Fullerton (16–9)	Baylor (20–11)	Baylor (22–12)	Florida Atlantic (32–6)	Baylor (29–14)	Baylor (31–16)	Southern California (28–18)	Baylor (34–18)	Notre Dame (41–14)	Southern California (34–22)	Arkansas (34–26)	Arkansas (35–28)	Arkansas (51–15)	18.
19.	Notre Dame	Notre Dame (0–0)	Notre Dame (0–0)	Notre Dame (0–0)	Nebraska (3–3)	Miami (FL) (9–6)	Texas (16–6)	Cal State Fullerton (13–9)	Arizona State (18–9)	Cal State Fullerton (18–10)	Cal State Fullerton (21–10)	Cal State Fullerton (23–12)	Texas A&M (31–15)	Notre Dame (30–120	Notre Dame (34–13)	LSU (35–17)	South Alabama (38–16)	Texas Tech (41–18)	North Carolina (43–210	North Carolina (43–21)	North Carolina (43–21)	19.
20.	Arizona State	Arizona State (4–0)	Texas (3–2)	Texas A&M (6–1)	Alabama (8–0)	Cal State Fullerton (10–6)	Cal State Fullerton (11–8)	Arizona State (16–8)	North Carolina (15–8)	Arizona State (20–10)	Florida Atlantic (29–6)	Nebraska (23–13)	Florida Atlantic (34–7)	South Alabama (31–12)	South Alabama (33–13)	Southern California (30–19)	Richmond (48–8)	South Alabama (41–17)	Florida (46–19)	Florida (46–19)	Florida (46–19)	20.
21.	Florida	Florida (2–0)	Long Beach State (2–1)	Long Beach State (4–2)	Long Beach State (6–3)	Alabama (11–1)	Nebraska (8–5)	East Carolina (14–3–1)	Ohio State (12–3–1)	Oklahoma State (20–7)	Long Beach State (20–9)	Long Beach State (23–10)	Richmond (35–6)	Richmond (36–7)	Richmond (41–8)	Richmond (46–8)	Cal State Fullerton (34–17)	Arizona State (35–19)	Oral Roberts (48–19)	Oral Roberts (48–19)	Oral Roberts (48–19)	21.
22.	Georgia Tech	Georgia Tech (0–0)	San Diego (9–0)	Louisiana–Lafayette (5–1)	Texas Tech (13–4)	East Carolina (10–0)	Ohio State (6–1–1)	Texas Tech (20–10)	San Diego (24–6)	Florida Atlantic (26–6)	Arizona State (22–12)	Arizona State (24–13)	Long Beach State (25–12)	Texas Tech (34–16)	Texas Tech (34–16)	Texas Tech (37–16)	Southern California (31–22)	San Jose State (45–15)	Wichita State (47–17)	Wichita State (47–17)	Wichita State (47–17)	22.
23.	Mississippi State	Mississippi State (0–0)	Mississippi State (0–0)	Baylor (4–3)	Baylor (7–4)	Tulane (8–5)	Mississippi State (9–2–1)	Ohio State (8–2–1)	Auburn (20–6)	Long Beach State (18–9)	Richmond (28–3)	Richmond (32–4)	Southern California (24–16)	Texas A&M (32–18)	Texas A&M (32–18)	Notre Dame (36–14)	San Jose State (42–15)	Richmond (49–10)	Cal State Northridge (41–17)	Cal State Northridge (41–17)	Cal State Northridge (41–17)	23.
24.	Ohio State	Ohio State (0–0)	Ohio State (0–0)	Mississippi State (0–0)	Notre Dame (1–2)	Notre Dame (4–3)	Miami (FL) (10–8)	Oklahoma State (12–5)	Northwestern State (20–3)	Richmond (24–2)	Oklahoma (19–12)	Stetson (31–5)	South Alabama (28–11)	Cal State Fullerton (29–15)	Cal State Fullerton (31–16)	Texas A&M (34–19)	Arizona State (32–19)	Long Beach State (37–19)	Texas Tech (42–20)	Texas Tech (42–20)	Texas Tech (42–20)	24.
25.	Rutgers	Rutgers (0–0)	Rutgers (0–0)	FIU (7–1)	Ohio State (3–0–1)	Ohio State (4–0–1)	Stetson (15–2)	San Diego (21–5)	Richmond (19–2)	Ohio State (15–5–1)	Ohio State (18–6–1)	Southwest Missouri State (24–6)	James Madison (33–9)	Florida Atlantic (36–9)	LSU (33–16)	Cal State Fullerton (34–17)	Louisville (39–14)	Cal State Fullerton (36–20)	South Alabama (42–19)	South Alabama (42–19)	South Alabama (42–19)	25.
26.	Texas Tech	Texas Tech (4–1)	Arizona (10–1)	Ohio State (0–0)	East Carolina (7–0)	Mississippi State (6–1–1)	Tulane (11–6)	Rutgers (8–4)	Texas Tech (21–12)	San Diego (25–8)	Stetson (27–5)	James Madison (30–8)	Cal State Northridge (29–13)	Long Beach State (26–15)	San Jose State (39–13)	James Madison (40–10)	Long Beach State (34–19)	UCF (40–20)	Arizona State (37–21)	Arizona State (37–21)	Arizona State (37–21)	26.
27.	Purdue	Purdue (0–0)	Purdue (0–0)	Rutgers (0–0)	Mississippi State (1–1–1)	Louisiana–Lafayette (10–3)	San Diego (18–4)	Auburn (17–5)	Oklahoma State (15–7)	Auburn (21–8)	Southwest Missouri State (20–5)	LSU (24–13)	San Diego State (33–13)	James Madison (36–10)	James Madison (36–10)	San Jose State (41–15)	Oklahoma (33–23)	East Carolina (41–18–1)	Long Beach State (39–21)	Long Beach State (39–21)	Long Beach State (39–21)	27.
28.	Ball State	Ball State (0–0)	Ball State (0–0)	Purdue (0–0)	Louisiana–Lafayette (7–3)	Arizona (17–4)	Auburn (15–4)	Long Beach State (13–6)	Florida Atlantic (22–6)	Texas Tech (23–13)	Southern Miss (21–11)	San Diego State (29–12)	San Jose State (33–12)	LSU (30–15)	Oklahoma State (33–15)	Louisville (35–13)	James Madison (41–12)	Southwest Missouri State (41–19)	Cal State Fullerton (37–22)	Cal State Fullerton (37–22)	Cal State Fullerton (37–22)	28.
29.	East Carolina	East Carolina (0–0)	East Carolina (0–0)	East Carolina (3–0)	Arizona (14–4)	Stetson (10–1)	Long Beach State (10–6)	Vanderbilt (13–4)	Georgia (12–5)	Georgia (15–7)	East Carolina (23–7–1)	South Alabama (23–11)	Louisville (25–10)	San Jose State (35–13)	Kent State (30–13)	Oklahoma State (34–17)	Baylor (34–22)	Oklahoma (35–25)	San Jose State (45–17)	San Jose State (45–17)	San Jose State (35–17)	29.
30.	Texas A&M	Texas A&M (0–0)	Texas A&M (2–1)	Ball State (0–0)	Stetson (8–0)	Rutgers (5–1)	Texas Tech (17–8)	Stetson (19–4)	Stetson (21–5)	Stetson (23–5)	James Madison (26–7)	San Jose State (29–12)	Arizona State (25–15)	East Carolina (33–10–1)	Florida Atlantic (37–11)	Southern Miss (35–17)	Minnesota (30–24)	Ohio State (36–18–1)	Louisiana–Lafayette (39–23)	Louisiana–Lafayette (39–23)	Louisiana–Lafayette (39–23)	30.
	Preseason Dec 20	Week 1 Feb 4	Week 2 Feb 11	Week 3 Feb 18	Week 4 Feb 25	Week 5 Mar 4	Week 6 Mar 11	Week 7 Mar 18	Week 8 Mar 25	Week 9 Apr 1	Week 10 Apr 8	Week 11 Apr 15	Week 12 Apr 22	Week 13 Apr 29	Week 14 May 6	Week 15 May 13	Week 16 May 20	Week 17 May 27	Week 18 June 3	Week 19 June 10	Week 20 June 24	
		None	Dropped: 17 Fresno State; 18 Baylor; 26 Texas Tech	Dropped: 7 Southern California; 22 San Diego; 26 Arizona	Dropped: 25 FIU; 27 Rutgers; 28 Purdue; 30 Ball State	Dropped: 21 Long Beach State; 22 Texas Tech	Dropped: 24 Notre Dame; 27 Louisiana–Lafayette; 28 Arizona; 30 Rutgers	Dropped: 23 Mississippi State; 24 Miami (FL); 26 Tulane	Dropped: 14 LSU; 21 East Carolina; 26 Rutgers; 28 Long Beach State; 29 Vanderbilt	Dropped: 24 Northwestern State	Dropped: 26 San Diego; 27 Auburn; 28 Texas Tech; 29 Georgia	Dropped: 24 Ohio State; 25 Stetson; 28 Southern Miss; 29 East Carolina	Dropped: 24 Stetson; 25 Southwest Missouri State; 27 LSU	Dropped: 16 Oklahoma State; 27 San Diego State; 29 Louisville; 30 Arizona State	Dropped: 26 Long Beach State; 30 East Carolina	Dropped: 29 Kent State; 30 Florida Atlantic	Dropped: 16 Ole Miss; 24 Texas A&M; 29 Oklahoma State; 30 Southern Miss	Dropped: 25 Louisville; 28 James Madison; 29 Baylor; 30 Minnesota	Dropped: 26 UCF; 27 East Carolina; 28 Southwest Missouri State; 29 Oklahoma; 30 Ohio State	None	None	

== NCBWA ==
	Preseason Jan 18	Week 1 Feb 5	Week 2 Feb 12	Week 3 Feb 19	Week 4 Feb 26	Week 5 Mar 5	Week 6 Mar 12	Week 7 Mar 19	Week 8 Mar 26	Week 9 Apr 2	Week 10 Apr 9	Week 11 Apr 16	Week 12 Apr 23	Week 13 Apr 30	Week 14 May 7	Week 15 May 14	Week 16 May 21	Week 17 May 28	Week 18 June 24	
1.	Stanford	Stanford (2–1)	Stanford ( 4–2)	Stanford (6–3)	Stanford (9–4)	Stanford (12–4)	Florida State (20–4)	Florida State (24–5)	Clemson (18–1)	Clemson (23–1)	Clemson (27–2)	Clemson (30–4)	Clemson (34–5)	Clemson (38–6)	Clemson (39–7)	Clemson (42–9)	Florida State (51–12)	Florida State (56–12)	Texas (57–15)	1.
2.	Miami (FL)	Tulane (0–0)	LSU (3–0)	Florida State (10–3)	South Carolina (9–0)	Clemson (6–0)	Clemson (10–0)	Clemson (14–1)	Stanford (27–5)	Stanford (19–6)	Stanford (22–6)	Alabama (32–5)	Rice (35–8)	Rice (39–8)	Rice (39–8)	Alabama (43–9)	Rice (44–11)	Rice (47–11)	South Carolina (57–18)	2.
3.	Southern California	Florida State (6–1)	Florida State (7–3)	LSU (6–1)	Clemson (3–0)	South Carolina (9–2)	Stanford (14–5)	Stanford (14–5)	Rice (23–4)	Rice (26–5)	Rice (28–7)	Rice (31–8)	Wake Forest (33–6)	Alabama (38–7)	Wake Forest (38–8)	Florida State (48–12)	South Carolina (44–12)	Texas (48–14)	Clemson (54–17)	3.
4.	Clemson	Southern California (0–0)	South Carolina (3–0)	South Carolina (6–0)	Florida State (12–4)	Florida State (17–4)	Rice (15–4)	Rice (18–4)	South Carolina (21–4)	South Carolina (23–6)	Alabama (28–5)	Stanford (25–8)	Stanford (27–10)	Wake Forest (36–8)	Alabama (40–9)	Wake Forest (39–8)	Wake Forest (42–9)	Alabama (48–13)	Georgia Tech (52–16)	4.
5.	Florida State	Miami (FL) (2–1)	Clemson (0–0)	Clemson (0–0)	Florida (10–0)	Florida (11–2)	Georgia Tech (13–1)	South Carolina (18–3)	Georgia Tech (18–3)	Florida (24–6)	Georgia Tech (27–4)	Wake Forest (28–5)	Alabama (34–7)	Florida State (41–12)	Florida State (43–12)	South Carolina (39–12)	Texas (43–13)	South Carolina (48–14)	Stanford (47–18)	5.
6.	Tulane	Clemson (0–0)	Southern California (1–2)	Rice (6–1)	Rice (10–1)	Wichita State (5–0)	Wichita State (8–1)	Wichita State (10–2)	Florida State (26–8)	Georgia Tech (22–4)	Wake Forest (25–6)	South Carolina (28–8)	South Carolina (31–9)	South Carolina (34–10)	South Carolina (37–11)	Rice (41–10)	Houston (41–14)	Clemson (47–14)	Rice (52–14)	6.
7.	South Carolina	LSU (0–0)	Tulane (1–2)	Wichita State (3–0)	Wichita State (5–0)	Georgia Tech (9–1)	South Carolina (14–2)	Florida (18–3)	Florida (21–5)	Wake Forest (22–5)	South Carolina (24–8)	Georgia Tech (30–5)	Ole Miss (32–9)	Texas (37–11)	North Carolina (35–15)	North Carolina (37–15)	Clemson (44–12)	Wake Forest (44–11)	Notre Dame (50–18)	7.
8.	Nebraska	Nebraska (0–0)	Nebraska (0–0	Florida (8–0)	LSU (8–3)	LSU (10–4)	LSU (13–5)	Georgia Tech (14–3)	Alabama (21–3)	Alabama (23–5)	Ole Miss (25–7)	Florida State (34–11)	Florida State (38–12)	Houston (32–12)	Texas (39–13)	Texas (39–13)	Georgia Tech (44–12)	Houston (44–15)	Nebraska (47–21)	8.
9.	LSU	Rice (0–0)	Rice (2–1)	Tulane (4–2)	Miami (FL) (8–4)	Miami (FL) (9–6)	Florida (13–3)	Wake Forest (16–2)	Wake Forest (19–4)	Houston (21–8)	Wichita State (20–7)	Houston (27–10)	Texas (34–10)	Stanford (29–12)	Stanford (32–13)	Stanford (35–14)	Alabama (44–12)	Florida (43–17)	Houston (48–17)	9.
10.	Rice	Wichita State (0–0)	Wichita State (0–0)	Ole Miss (3–0)	Georgia Tech (8–1)	Cal State Fullerton (10–6)	Ole Miss (12–3)	Baylor (17–6)	Nebraska (14–7)	Wichita State (16–6)	Texas (28–9)	Wichita State (24–8)	Houston (29–12)	Georgia Tech (36–9)	Georgia Tech (37–10)	Georgia Tech (41–11)	LSU (38–17)	LSU (40–19)	Florida State (60–14)	10.
11.	Wichita State	Ole Miss (0–0)	Ole Miss (0–0	Wake Forest (3–1)	Texas (12–2)	Wake Forest (10–1)	Wake Forest (13–2)	Alabama (19–2)	Houston (18–7)	Florida State (28–10)	Houston (23–10)	Ole Miss (29–8)	Florida (30–12)	Wichita State (32–10)	Florida (35–13)	Houston (37–14)	Florida (40–15)	Stanford (40–16)	Richmond (53–13)	11.
12.	Cal State Fullerton	Wake Forest (0–0)	Wake Forest (0–0)	Mississippi State (0–0)	Tulane (7–3)	Ole Miss (9–2)	Arizona State (15–5)	Nebraska (11–5)	Baylor (19–8)	Ole Miss (21–7)	Florida State (30–11)	Texas (31–10)	Cal State Fullerton (27–12)	East Carolina (33–10)	Houston (34–14)	Florida (37–15)	Stanford (37–16)	Georgia Tech (46–14)	LSU (44–22)	12.
13.	Texas	Texas (0–0)	Florida (5–0)	Oklahoma State (4–0)	Cal State Fullerton (9–4)	Baylor (9–5)	Baylor (12–6)	Houston (15–5)	Wichita State (13–5)	Texas (25–8)	Nebraska (21–10)	Florida (26–12)	Georgia Tech (32–8)	Ole Miss (34–11)	Ole Miss (35–13)	Wichita State (39–12)	North Carolina (39–17)	North Carolina (40–19)	Southern California (36–24)	13.
14.	Notre Dame	Oklahoma State (0–0)	Oklahoma State (0–0)	Texas (7–2)	Ole Miss (6–1)	Nebraska (6–3)	Houston (12–4)	Texas (20–6)	Texas (24–6)	Cal State Fullerton (18–10)	North Carolina (22–11)	Baylor (27–12)	East Carolina (29–10)	North Carolina (32–15)	Wichita State (36–11)	Nebraska (35–17)	Nebraska (39–17)	Nebraska (42–18)	Wake Forest (47–13)	14.
15.	Oklahoma State	Arizona State (4–0)	Arizona State (7–0)	Georgia Tech (5–0)	Wake Forest (7–1)	Rice (12–3)	Alabama (14–2)	LSU (14–8)	Cal State Fullerton (16–9)	Nebraska (17–9)	Oklahoma State (22–8)	Arizona State (24–13)	Baylor (29–14)	Nebraska (30–15)	Nebraska (32–17)	LSU (35–17)	Wichita State (42–13)	Wichita State (46–14)	Florida Atlantic (46–21)	15.
16.	Arizona State	Florida (2–0)	Texas (3–2)	Miami (FL) (5–4)	Alabama (8–0)	Arizona State (11–5)	Nebraska (8–5)	Arizona State (16–8)	Arizona State (18–9)	Arizona State (20–10)	Florida (24–10)	Oklahoma State (25–9)	Florida Atlantic (32–6)	Florida (32–13)	Cal State Northridge (35–13)	Baylor (34–18)	Cal State Fullerton (34–17)	Cal State Northridge (40–15)	Alabama (51–15)	16.
17.	Ole Miss	Notre Dame (0–0)	Georgia Tech (0–0)	Nebraska (1–2)	Baylor (7–4)	Houston (9–4)	Miami (FL) (10–8)	Cal State Fullerton (13–9)	Ole Miss (16–7)	Oklahoma (18–9)	Richmond (28–3)	Florida Atlantic (32–9)	Nebraska (26–14)	Cal State Northridge (32–13)	Notre Dame (34–13)	Notre Dame (36–14)	Notre Dame (41–14)	Notre Dame (44–15)	North Carolina (43–21)	17.
18.	Baylor	Baylor (0–0)	Miami (FL) (2–4)	Notre Dame (0–0)	Nebraska (3–3)	Ohio State (4–0)	Cal State Fullerton (11–8)	Auburn (17–5)	Auburn (20–6)	Richmond (24–2)	Texas A&M (26–11)	Richmond (32–4)	Wichita State (27–10)	Baylor (31–16)	Baylor (34–17)	Cal State Fullerton (34–17)	Cal State Northridge (40–15)	San Jose State (45–15)	Arkansas (35–28)	18.
19.	Georgia Tech	Georgia Tech (0–0)	Notre Dame (0–0)	Cal State Fullerton (6–3)	Arizona State (8–5)	Texas A&M (13–4)	Texas A&M (16–5)	FIU (20–4)	Richmond (19–2)	Texas A&M (23–10)	Cal State Fullerton (21–10)	Cal State Fullerton (23–12)	Richmond (35–6)	Richmond (36–7)	Richmond (41–8)	Richmond (46–8)	Richmond (48–8)	Southern California (34–22)	Miami (FL) (34–29)	19.
20.	UCF	Mississippi State (0–0)	Mississippi State (0–0)	Ohio State (0–0)	Texas Tech (13–4)	Alabama (11–1)	East Carolina (13–1)	Oklahoma (15–5)	Texas A&M (20–10)	Long Beach State (18–9)	Long Beach State (20–9)	Texas A&M (28–13)	Texas A&M (31–15)	Cal State Fullerton (29–15)	Cal State Fullerton (31–16)	South Alabama (36–14)	Texas Tech (40–16)	Richmond (49–10)	Oral Roberts (48–19)	20.
21.	Mississippi State	Ohio State (0–0)	Ohio State (0–0)	Baylor (4–3)	Ohio State (3–0)	Mississippi State (6–1)	Mississippi State (9–2)	Rutgers (8–4)	North Carolina (15–8)	Baylor (20–11)	Baylor (22–12)	Long Beach State (23–10)	Oklahoma State (29–11)	South Alabama (31–12)	South Alabama (33–13)	Texas Tech (37–16)	South Alabama (38–16)	Texas Tech (41–18)	Florida (46–19)	21.
22.	Wake Forest	Rutgers (0–0)	Rutgers (0–0)	Rutgers (0–0)	Texas A&M (10–2)	Texas (14–4)	Oklahoma State (10–3)	Texas A&M (17–9)	San Diego (24–6)	Oklahoma State (20–7)	Florida Atlantic (29–6)	Nebraska (23–13)	South Alabama (28–11)	Florida Atlantic (36–9)	East Carolina (35–13)	Ole Miss (35–16)	Arizona State (32–19)	South Alabama (41–17)	Wichita State (47–17)	22.
23.	Rutgers	Texas Tech (5–1)	Purdue (0–0)	Purdue (0–0)	Mississippi State (1–1)	East Carolina (10–0)	Texas (16–6)	Northwestern State (17–2)	Oklahoma (16–7)	Florida Atlantic (26–6)	East Carolina (23–7)	Southwest Missouri State (24–6)	Arizona State (25–15)	Southern California (28–17)	Southern California (28–18)	Southern California (30–19)	Southern California (31–22)	Arizona State (35–19)	Arizona State (37–21)	23.
24.	Ohio State	Purdue (0–0)	Cal State Fullerton (3–3)	Arizona State (7–3)	East Carolina (7–0)	Notre Dame (4–3)	Auburn (15–4)	East Carolina (14–3)	Ohio State (12–3)	Ohio State (15–5–1)	Ohio State (18–6)	Stetson (31–5)	North Carolina (18–14)	Arizona State (26–16)	Arizona State (27–16)	East Carolina (36–15)	San Jose State (42–15)	Long Beach State (37–19)	Cal State Northridge (41–17)	24.
25.	Minnesota	Cal State Fullerton (1–2)	Texas Tech (6–2)	Texas Tech (8–4)	Notre Dame (1–2)	Arizona (17–4)	Northwestern State (13–2)	San Diego (21–5)	Northwestern State (20–3)	North Carolina (19–9)	Arizona State (22–12)	James Madison (30–8)	Cal State Northridge (29–13)	Texas Tech (34–16)	James Madison (36–10)	James Madison (40–10)	Louisville (39–14)	Cal State Fullerton (36–20)	Texas Tech (42–20)	25.
26.	Purdue	Fresno State (1–2)	Long Beach State (2–1)	Alabama (4–0)	Arizona (14–4)	Louisiana–Lafayette (10–3)	Tulane (11–6)	Long Beach State (13–6)	FIU (23–5)	San Diego (25–8)	Stetson (27–5)	East Carolina (26–9)	San Diego State (33–13)	Notre Dame (30–12); James Madison (36–10)	Texas Tech (34–16)	Texas A&M (34–19)	Mississippi State (33–22)	Louisville (39–16)	South Alabama (42–19)	26.
27.	Texas Tech	Tennessee (1–2)	Baylor (0–3)	Texas A&M (6–1)	Louisiana–Lafayette (7–3)	Stetson (10–1)	Stetson (15–2)	Texas Tech (20–10)	Oklahoma State (15–7)	FIU (26–7)	Auburn (24–10)	North Carolina (25–13)	San Jose State (33–12)	LSU (30–15)	San Jose State (39–13)	San Jose State (41–15)	Baylor (34–22)	UCF (40–20)	Cal State Fullerton (37–22)	27.
28.	Cal State Northridge	Ball State (0–0)	Ball State (0–0)	East Carolina (3–0)	Stetson (8–0)	San Diego (15–3)	San Diego (18–4)	Oklahoma State (12–5)	Stetson (21–5)	Louisiana–Lafayette (20–10)	Southwest Missouri State (20–5)	Auburn (25–13)	James Madison (33–9)	Texas A&M (32–18)	LSU (33–16)	Cal State Northridge (36–15)	Texas A&M (34–22)	Baylor (34–24)	Baylor (36–26)	28.
29.	Louisiana–Lafayette	Jacksonville (0–0)	Arizona (10–1)	Louisiana–Lafayette (5–1)	Houston (6–4)	Tulane (8–5)	FIU (15–4)	Ohio State (8–2)	LSU (15–11)	Texas Tech (23–13)	James Madison (26–7)	Northwestern State (28–8)	Northwestern State (32–9)	Northwestern State (29–15)	Texas A&M (32–18)	Louisville (35–13)	James Madison (41–22)	East Carolina (41–19)	Long Beach State (39–21)	29.
30.	Long Beach State	UCF (0–0)	Texas A&M (2–1)	FIU (7–1)	Long Beach State (6–3)	Long Beach State (7–6)	Long Beach State (10–6)	Vanderbilt (13–4)	Texas Tech (21–12)	Stetson (23–5)	Northwestern State (24–8)	LSU (24–13)	Auburn (27–15)	Oklahoma State (29–15)	Northwestern State (38–9)	Southern Miss (35–17)	Oklahoma (33–23)	Oklahoma (35–25)	San Jose State (45–17)	30.
31.	Texas A&M	Texas A&M (0–0)	Jacksonville (0–0)	Long Beach State (4–2)	San Diego (13–3)	Kansas (8–0)	Oklahoma (11–4)	Southern Miss (14–5)	South Alabama (16–9)	East Carolina (19–6–1)	FIU (26–10)	San Jose State (29–12)	Louisville (29–10)	San Jose State (35–13)	Oklahoma State (33–15)	Oklahoma State (34–17)	Oklahoma State (37–19)	Ohio State (36–18)	Louisiana–Lafayette (39–23)	31.
32.	Oral Roberts	Loyola Marymount (2–0)	UCF (0–0)	Arizona (10–4)	Rutgers (2–1)	Oklahoma State (6–2)	Pittsburgh (10–3)	College of Charleston (16–5)	College of Charleston (18–6)	College of Charleston (20–7)	Oklahoma (19–12)	Oral Roberts (23–9)	Southern California (24–16)	Ohio State (25–13)	Florida Atlantic (37–11)	Arizona State (28–18)	Southern Miss (35–20)	Southwest Missouri State (41–19)	Southwest Missouri State (45–22	32.
33.	Nevada	Long Beach State (0–0)	San Diego (9–0)	Georgia (0–0)	Kansas (8–0)	Southern Miss (9–2)	Middle Tennessee (8–3)	Stetson (19–4)	Louisville (16–4)	Southern Miss (18–10)	College of Charleston (22–9)	Southern Miss (24–13)	Notre Dame (27–12)	Long Beach State (26–15)	Southern Miss (33–16)	California (29–16)	East Carolina (37–18)	New Mexico State (37–23)	Louisville (39–19)	33.
34.	California	Minnesota (0–0)	TCU (2–1)	Southern California (2–4)	Auburn (7–4)	Rutgers (5–1)	Texas Tech (17–8)	Richmond (15–2)	Southern Miss (17–7)	Georgia (15–7)	LSU (20–13)	Notre Dame (21–12)	LSU (26–15)	Southwest Missouri State (30–10)	Louisville (31–13)	Northwestern State (39–13)	Northwestern State (40–15)	Northwestern State (43–17)	Northwestern State (45–18)	34.
35.	Ball State	California (0–0)	Minnesota (0–0)	Auburn (6–1)	Southern California (5–5)	NC State (11–3)	Notre Dame (6–4)	Tulane (13–8)	Long Beach State (15–9)	LSU (17–12)	Oregon State (19–11)	South Alabama (23–11)	Steston (32–8)	Auburn (27–18)	Oregon State (30–15)	Oregon State (30–18)	Ohio State (33–17)	Maine (40–15)	Southeast Missouri State (38–20)	35.
	Preseason Jan 18	Week 1 Feb 5	Week 2 Feb 12	Week 3 Feb 19	Week 4 Feb 26	Week 5 Mar 5	Week 6 Mar 12	Week 7 Mar 19	Week 8 Mar 26	Week 9 Apr 2	Week 10 Apr 9	Week 11 Apr 16	Week 12 Apr 23	Week 13 Apr 30	Week 14 May 7	Week 15 May 14	Week 16 May 21	Week 17 May 28	Week 18 June 24	
		Dropped: 7 South Carolina; 28 Cal State Northridge; 29 Louisiana–Lafayette; 32 Oral Roberts; 33 Nevada	Dropped: 26 Fresno State; 27 Tennessee; 32 Loyola Marymount; 35 California	Dropped: 28 Ball State; 31 Jacksonville; 32 UCF; 33 San Diego; 34 TCU; 35 Minnesota	Dropped: 13 Oklahoma State; 23 Purdue; 30 FIU; 33 Georgia	Dropped: 20 Texas Tech; 34 Auburn; 35 Southern California	Dropped: 18 Ohio State; 25 Arizona; 26 Louisiana–Lafayette; 31 Kansas; 33 Southern Miss; 34 Rutgers; 35 NC State	Dropped: 10 Ole Miss; 21 Mississippi State; 32 Pittsburgh; 33 Middle Tennessee; 35 Notre Dame	Dropped: 21 Rutgers; 24 East Carolina; 30 Vanderbilt; 35 Tulane	Dropped: 18 Auburn; 25 Northwestern State; 31 South Alabama; 33 Louisville	Dropped: 26 San Diego; 28 Louisiana–Lafayette; 29 Texas Tech; 33 Southern Miss; 34 Georgia	Dropped: 24 Ohio State; 31 FIU; 32 Oklahoma; 33 College of Charleston; 35 Oregon State	Dropped: 21 Long Beach State; 23 Southwest Missouri State; 32 Oral Roberts; 33 Southern Miss	Dropped: 26 San Diego State; 31 Louisville; 35 Stetson	Dropped: 32 Ohio State; 33 Long Beach State; 34 Southwest Missouri State; 35 Auburn	Dropped: 32 Florida Atlantic	Dropped: 22 Ole Miss; 33 California; 35 Oregon State	Dropped: 26 Mississippi State; 28 Texas A&M; 29 James Madison; 31 Oklahoma State; 32 Southern Miss	Dropped: 27 UCF; 29 East Carolina; 30 Oklahoma; 31 Ohio State; 33 New Mexico; 35 Maine	
