= 1875 St. Louis Red Stockings season =

1875 St. Louis Red Stockings
- League: National Association of Professional Base Ball Players
- Ballpark: Red Stocking Baseball Park
- City: St. Louis, Missouri
- Record: 4–15 (.211)
- League place: 10th
- Manager: Charlie Sweasy

The St. Louis Red Stockings played their first and only season of professional baseball in 1875 as a member of the National Association of Professional Base Ball Players. They finished tenth in the league with a record of 4–15.

== Regular season ==
=== Season standings ===
National Association	W	L	T	Pct.	GB
Boston Red Stockings	71	8	3	.884	—
Philadelphia Athletics	53	20	4	.714	15
Hartford Dark Blues	54	28	3	.653	18½
St. Louis Brown Stockings	39	29	2	.571	26½
Philadelphia White Stockings	37	31	2	.543	28½
Chicago White Stockings	30	37	2	.449	35
New York Mutuals	30	38	3	.444	35½
New Haven Elm Citys	7	40	—	.149	48
Washington Nationals	5	23	—	.179	40½
St. Louis Red Stockings	4	15	—	.211	37
Philadelphia Centennials	2	12	—	.143	36½
Brooklyn Atlantics	2	42	—	.045	51½
Keokuk Westerns	1	12	—	.077	37

=== Record vs. opponents ===
1875 National Association Records Sources:
Team	BOS	BR	CHI	HAR	KEO	NH	NY	PHA	PHC	PWS	SLB	SLR	WSH
Boston	—	6–0	8–2	9–1	1–0	5–1	10–0	8–2–2	4–0	6–0–1	7–2	1–0	6–0
Brooklyn	0–6	—	0–2	0–10	0–0	2–1	0–7	0–7	0–0	0–7	0–2	0–0	0–0
Chicago	2–8	2–0	—	4–6–1	4–0	2–1	3–3	1–7–1	0–0	3–7	5–5	4–0	0–0
Hartford	1–9	10–0	6–4–1	—	0–0	8–1	8–2–2	4–3–1	1–0	4–4	5–5	3–0	4–0
Keokuk	0–1	0–0	0–4	0–0	—	0–0	0–1	0–0	0–0	0–0	0–4	1–2	0–0
New Haven	1–5	1–2	1–2	1–8	0–0	—	1–5	0–7	0–1	0–4	1–2	0–0	1–4
New York	0–10	7–0	3–3	2–8–2	1–0	5–1	—	3–6	2–0	5–2	0–8–1	2–0	0–0
Philadelphia Athletics	2–8–2	7–0	7–1–1	3–4–1	0–0	7–0	6–3	—	2–1	8–2	6–1	0–0	5–0
Philadelphia Centennials	0–4	0–0	0–0	0–1	0–0	1–0	0–2	1–2	—	0–3	0–0	0–0	0–0
Philadelphia White Stockings	0–6–1	7–0	7–3	4–4	0–0	4–0	2–5	2–8	3–0	—	5–5–1	1–0	2–0
St. Louis Brown Stockings	2–7	2–0	5–5	5–5	4–0	2–1	8–0–1	1–6	0–0	5–5–1	—	2–0	3–0
St. Louis Red Stockings	0–1	0–0	0–4	0–3	2–1	0–0	0–2	0–0	0–0	0–1	0–2	—	2–1
Washington	0–6	0–0	0–0	0–4	0–0	4–1	0–0	0–5	0–0	0–2	0–3	1–2	—

=== Roster ===
1875 St. Louis Red Stockings
Roster
Pitchers: Joe Blong; Catchers: Packy Dillon; Silver Flint	Infielders: John Dillon; Joe Ellick; Charlie Hautz; Trick McSorley; Billy Redmond; Charlie Sweasy	Outfielders: Art Croft; Pidgey Morgan; Tom Oran	Managers: Charlie Sweasy

== Player stats ==
=== Batting ===
Note: G = Games played; AB = At bats; H = Hits; Avg. = Batting average; HR = Home runs; RBI = Runs batted in

Player	G	AB	H	Avg.	HR	RBI
Silver Flint	17	61	5	.082	0	1
Charlie Hautz	19	83	25	.301	0	4
Charlie Sweasy	19	76	13	.171	0	4
Billy Redmond	19	82	16	.195	0	1
Trick McSorley	15	52	11	.212	0	2
Tom Oran	18	81	15	.185	0	10
Pidgey Morgan	19	69	18	.261	0	1
Art Croft	19	75	15	.200	0	2
Joe Ellick	7	27	6	.222	0	1
Packy Dillon	3	13	3	.231	0	1
John Dillon	1	1	0	.000	0	0

=== Starting pitchers ===
Note: G = Games pitched; IP = Innings pitched; W = Wins, L = Losses; ERA = Earned run average; SO = Strikeouts

Player	G	IP	W	L	ERA	SO
Joe Blong	15	129.0	3	12	3.07	14
Pidgey Morgan	7	42.0	1	3	1.29	7
