= Notre Dame Fighting Irish baseball statistical leaders =

The Notre Dame Fighting Irish baseball statistical leaders are individual statistical leaders of the Notre Dame Fighting Irish baseball program in various categories, including batting average, home runs, runs batted in, runs, hits, stolen bases, ERA, and Strikeouts. Within those areas, the lists identify single-game, single-season, and career leaders. The Fighting Irish represent the University of Notre Dame in the NCAA's Atlantic Coast Conference.

Notre Dame began competing in intercollegiate baseball in 1892. These lists are updated through the end of the 2025 season.

== Batting Average ==
Career (minimum 2.5 AB/game)
Rk	Player	AVG	Seasons
1	Dan Peltier	.406 (257/633)	1987 1988 1989
2	Eric Danapilis	.405 (295/729)	1990 1991 1992 1993
3	Steve Stanley	.384 (385/1003)	1999 2000 2001 2002
4	Mark Quatrani	.376 (80/213)	2026
5	Scott Sollmann	.372 (239/643)	1994 1995 1996
6	Brant Ust	.368 (243/660)	1997 1998 1999
7	Pat Pesavento	.367 (296/806)	1986 1987 1988 1989
8	Robbie Kent	.364 (118/324)	1993 1994
9	Randall Brooks	.364 (233/640)	1994 1995 1996 1997
10	A. J. Pollock	.363 (237/653)	2007 2008 2009

Season (minimum 2.5 AB/game)
Rk	Player	AVG	Season
1	Edwin Hartwell	.447 (89/199)	1993
2	Dan Peltier	.446 (115/258)	1989
3	Steve Stanley	.439 (119/271)	2002
4	Eric Danapilis	.438 (96/219)	1993
5	Craig Cooper	.425 (97/228)	2006
6	Dave Bartish	.422 (43/102)	1980
7	Dan Peltier	.414 (89/215)	1988
8	Mike Metzler	.412 (56/136)	1984
9	Scott Sollmann	.406 (93/229)	1995
10	Scott Sollmann	.402 (76/189)	1994

== Home Runs ==
Career
Rk	Player	HR	Seasons
1	Jeff Wagner	49	1996 1997 1998 1999
2	Brant Ust	46	1997 1998 1999
	Niko Kavadas	46	2018 2019 2020 2021
4	Frank Jacobs	37	1989 1990 1991
	Mike Amrhein	37	1994 1995 1996 1997
	Alec Porzel	37	1998 1999 2000 2001
7	Ryan Topham	34	1993 1994 1995
	Matt Edwards	34	2002 2003 2004 2005
9	Joe Binkiewicz	33	1989 1990 1991 1992
	Brian Stavisky	33	2000 2001 2002

Season
Rk	Player	HR	Season
1	Niko Kavadas	22	2021
2	Frank Jacobs	20	1991
3	Tim Hutson	18	1988
	Ryan Topham	18	1995
	Brant Ust	18	1998
6	Jeff Wagner	17	1997
	Brant Ust	17	1999
	Carson Tinney	17	2025
9	Drew Berkland	16	2026
10	Dan Peltier	15	1989
	Joe Binkiewicz	15	1991
	Jeremy Barnes	15	2009
	David Glancy	15	2024
	Mark Quatrani	15	2026

Single Game
Rk	Player	HR	Season	Opponent
1	“Jerry” Sheehan	3	1906	Hillsdale
	Jake Kline	3	1916	Michigan
	Andy Pilney	3	1934	Chicago
	Jim Morris	3	1957	Naval Air Station
	Joe Binkiewicz	3	1991	Evansville
	Joe Binkiewicz	3	1991	Michigan
	Brant Ust	3	1998	Seton Hall
	Matt Edwards	3	2005	Western Michigan
	Estevan Moreno	3	2023	Virginia
	Estevan Moreno	3	2024	Tennessee Tech
	Estevan Moreno	3	2024	Purdue

== Runs Batted In ==
Career
Rk	Player	RBI	Seasons
1	Eric Danapilis	221	1990 1991 1992 1993
2	Alec Porzel	211	1998 1999 2000 2001
3	Dan Peltier	202	1987 1988 1989
	Mike Amrhein	202	1994 1995 1996 1997
5	Jeremy Barnes	197	2006 2007 2008 2009
6	Matt Edwards	195	2002 2003 2004 2005
7	Jeff Wagner	189	1996 1997 1998 1999
8	Joe Binkiewicz	176	1989 1990 1991 1992
9	J.J. Brock	174	1994 1995 1996 1997 1998
10	Brant Ust	170	1997 1998 1999

Season
Rk	Player	RBI	Season
1	Dan Peltier	93	1989
2	Eric Danapilis	85	1993
3	Robbie Kent	82	1994
4	Frank Jacobs	79	1991
	Ryan Topham	79	1995
6	Tim Hutson	74	1988
7	Mike Amrhein	71	1997
8	Dan Peltier	70	1988
	Jeremy Barnes	79	2009
10	Mike Amrhein	69	1995
	Jeff Wagner	69	1997
	Matt Edwards	69	2003

Single Game
Rk	Player	RBI	Season	Opponent
1	Jake Shepski	9	2016	Virginia Tech
2	Niko Kavadas	8	2021	UConn
3	Bob Roemer	7	1973	Xavier
	Tim Hutson	7	1988	Wake Forest
	Joe Binkiewicz	7	1991	Evansville
	Edwin Hartwell	7	1993	Illinois-Chicago
	Ryan Topham	7	1995	Illinois
	Andrew Bushey	7	2002	Detroit
	Steve Sollmann	7	2002	South Alabama
	Eric Gilgenbach	7	2018	LSU

== Runs ==
Career
Rk	Player	R	Seasons
1	Steve Stanley	256	1999 2000 2001 2002
2	Pat Pesavento	246	1986 1987 1988 1989
3	Greg Layson	219	1991 1992 1993 1994
4	Brett Lilley	212	2005 2006 2007 2008
5	Steve Sollmann	211	2001 2002 2003 2004
6	Eric Danapilis	205	1990 1991 1992 1993
7	Craig Counsell	204	1989 1990 1991 1992
8	Mike Amrhein	195	1994 1995 1996 1997
9	Paul O'Toole	191	1999 2000 2001 2002
	Craig Cooper	191	2003 2004 2005 2006

Season
Rk	Player	R	Season
1	Pat Pesavento	88	1989
2	Pat Pesavento	81	1988
	Dan Peltier	81	1989
4	Craig Cooper	79	2006
5	Steve Stanley	77	2002
6	Craig DeSensi	76	1995
	Steve Stanley	76	2001
	Matt Macri	76	2004
9	Scott Sollmann	73	1995
10	Edwin Hartwell	72	1993

Single Game
Rk	Player	R	Season	Opponent
1	Bobby Lynch	6	1900	Indiana
	Steve Sollmann	6	2002	South Alabama
3	Fred Morgan	5	1900	Indiana
	John Farley	5	1901	Upper Iowa
	John Walsh	5	1901	Purdue
	Pat Pesavento	5	1989	Penn
	Brant Ust	5	1998	Seton Hall
	Matt Macri	5	2004	Minnesota
	Brett Lilley	5	2007	Western Michigan
	Greg Sherry	5	2008	Georgetown
	A. J. Pollock	5	2008	Milwaukee
	Niko Kavadas	5	2021	UConn

== Hits ==
Career
Rk	Player	H	Seasons
1	Steve Stanley	385	1999 2000 2001 2002
2	Steve Sollmann	302	2001 2002 2003 2004
3	Pat Pesavento	296	1986 1987 1988 1989
4	Eric Danapilis	295	1990 1991 1992 1993
5	Alec Porzel	279	1998 1999 2000 2001
6	Brett Lilley	274	2005 2006 2007 2008
7	J.J. Brock	272	1994 1995 1996 1997 1998
8	Mike Amrhein	269	1994 1995 1996 1997
9	Craig Cooper	265	2003 2004 2005 2006
10	Jeremy Barnes	261	2006 2007 2008 2009

Season
Rk	Player	H	Season
1	Steve Stanley	119	2002
2	Dan Peltier	115	1989
3	Steve Stanley	102	2001
4	Steve Sollmann	98	2003
5	Craig Cooper	97	2006
6	Eric Danapilis	96	1993
7	Scott Sollmann	93	1995
8	Pat Pesavento	92	1989
9	Mike Amrhein	91	1997
10	James Sass	90	1989

Single Game
Rk	Player	H	Season	Opponent
1	Alec Porzel	6	2000	Pittsburgh
	Steve Sollmann	6	2002	South Alabama
3	Fred "Cy" Williams	5	Unknown	Unknown
	Charles Fleming	5	1900	Indiana
	Ed Reulbach	5	1903	Hillsdale
	Anton Stephan	5	1903	Hillsdale
	Roy Gage	5	1903	Hillsdale
	John Brogan	5	1906	Rose Poly
	Clarence Sheehan	5	1906	DePauw
	Red Smith	5	1927	Fort Benning
	Tom Sheehan	5	1943	Indiana
	John Creevey	5	1943	Michigan State
	Tom Sheehan	5	1944	Purdue
	Tim Prister	5	1982	Oklahoma City
	Tom Shields	5	1986	Northwestern
	James Sass	5	1988	Detroit
	Dan Peltier	5	1989	Detroit
	Joe Binkiewicz	5	1989	Dayton
	Scott Sollmann	5	1994	Purdue
	Mike Amrhein	5	1995	Pepperdine
	Allen Greene	5	1997	IUPUI
	Randall Brooks	5	1997	Central Mich.
	Randall Brooks	5	1997	Boston College
	Dan Leatherman	5	1998	Toledo
	Brant Ust	5	1998	Seton Hall
	Steve Stanley	5	2001	Milwaukee
	Brian Stavisky	5	2002	Detroit
	Paul O'Toole	5	2002	South Alabama
	Sean Gaston	5	2004	Minnesota
	Matt Macri	5	2004	Virginia Tech
	Brett Lilley	5	2005	Cincinnati
	Craig Cooper	5	2006	Connecticut
	A. J. Pollock	5	2007	Western Michigan
	Ryan Connolly	5	2010	Cincinnati
	Alex Robinson	5	2011	Purdue
	Carson Tinney	5	2025	Stanford

== Stolen Bases ==
Career
Rk	Player	SB	Seasons
1	Steve Stanley	116	1999 2000 2001 2002
2	Scott Sollmann	101	1994 1995 1996
3	Pat Pesavento	94	1986 1987 1988 1989
4	Steve Sollmann	84	2001 2002 2003 2004
5	Greg Layson	80	1991 1992 1993 1994
6	Dan Bautch	68	1990 1991 1992
7	Spencer Myers	63	2018 2019 2020 2021 2022
8	A. J. Pollock	60	2007 2008 2009
9	Paul O'Toole	54	1999 2000 2001 2002
10	Eric Danapilis	46	1990 1991 1992 1993

Season
Rk	Player	SB	Season
1	Scott Sollmann	52	1996
2	Pat Pesavento	38	1988
	Pat Pesavento	38	1989
	Steve Sollmann	38	2003
5	Steve Stanley	32	2002
6	Greg Layson	31	1994
	Steve Stanley	31	2001
8	Dan Bautch	29	1990
	Steve Stanley	29	2000
10	Matt Haas	28	1993
	A. J. Pollock	28	2008

== Earned Run Average ==
Career (minimum 60 IP)
Rk	Player	ERA	Seasons
1	Dan Slania	1.71 (23/121.0)	2011 2012 2013
2	Mike Dury	2.20 (20/81.2)	2004 2005 2006 2007
3	Nick Palihnich	2.36 (39/148.2)	1959 1960 1961
4	Pat Connaughton	2.43 (25/92.2)	2012 2013 2014
5	Jack Mitchell	2.49 (41/148.1)	1959 1960 1961
6	Aaron Heilman	2.49 (109/393.2)	1998 1999 2000 2001
7	Larry Mohs	2.52 (33/117.2)	1994 1995 1996 1997
8	Brandon Viloria	2.58 (24/83.2)	2000 2001 2002 2003
9	Phil Donnelly	2.64 (33/112.2)	1961 1962 1963
10	Jack Findlay	2.76 (27/88.0)	2022 2023 2024

Season (minimum 40 IP)
Rk	Player	ERA	Season
1	Jack Mitchell	0.71 (4/50.2)	1960
2	David Sinnes	1.05 (8/68.2)	1990
3	Dan Slania	1.21 (8/59.1)	2013
4	Nick Palihnich	1.25 (9/64.2)	1959
5	Phil Donnelly	1.27 (7/49.2)	1962
6	Chuck Symeon	1.31 (9/62.0)	1957
7	Nick Furlong	1.50 (9/54.0)	1969
	Mark Clementz	1.50 (7/42.0)	1982
9	Aaron Heilman	1.61 (12/67.0)	1998
10	Pat Connaughton	1.71 (9/47.1)	2013

== Strikeouts ==
Career
Rk	Player	K	Seasons
1	Aaron Heilman	425	1998 1999 2000 2001
2	David Sinnes	315	1990 1991 1992 1993
3	Tom Price	276	1991 1992 1993 1994
4	Alex Shilliday	265	1996 1997 1998 1999
5	Chris Michalak	263	1990 1991 1992 1993
6	Alan Walania	236	1990 1991 1992 1993
7	Chris Niesel	233	2002 2003 2004
8	Wade Korpi	227	2005 2006 2007 2008
9	Brian Dupra	224	2008 2009 2010 2011
10	Jack Radel	215	2024 2025 2026

Season
Rk	Player	K	Season
1	Aaron Heilman	118	1999
	Aaron Heilman	118	2000
3	Jack Radel	116	2026
4	Aaron Heilman	111	2001
	Jeff Manship	111	2006
	John Michael Bertrand	111	2022
7	Danny Tamayo	106	2001
8	Frank Carpin	102	1958
	David Phelps	102	2007
10	Tim Kalita	97	1999

Single Game
Rk	Player	K	Season	Opponent
1	Frank Carpin	19	1958	Indiana
2	Chuck Symeon	18	1958	Purdue
	Aaron Heilman	18	2000	West Virginia
4	Ed Reulbach	16	1904	Indiana
	Ed Reulbach	16	1904	Beloit
	Jean Dubuc	16	1907	Minnesota
	George Murphy	16	1917	St. Viator
	Mike Mandjiak	16	1938	Chicago
	Bob Hughes	16	1977	Bethel
10	Bill Perce	15	1906	Kalamazoo
	Dick Falvey	15	1923	St. Mary's, KY
	Ed Walsh	15	1926	Western State
	Ron Mottl	15	1955	Ohio State
