= Notre Dame Fighting Irish baseball =

Intercollegiate baseball team

- 2026 Notre Dame Fighting Irish baseball team
- Founded: 1892; 134 years ago
- University: University of Notre Dame
- Athletic director: Pete Bevacqua
- Head coach: Shawn Stiffler (4th season)
- Conference: ACC; Atlantic Division
- Location: Notre Dame, Indiana
- Home stadium: Frank Eck Stadium (capacity: 2,500)
- Nickname: Fighting Irish
- Colors: Blue and gold

College World Series appearances
- 1957, 2002, 2022

NCAA regional champions
- 2002, 2021, 2022

NCAA tournament appearances
- 1949, 1956, 1957, 1958, 1959, 1960, 1963, 1970, 1989, 1992, 1993, 1994, 1996, 1999, 2000, 2001, 2002, 2003, 2004, 2005, 2006, 2015, 2021, 2022

Conference tournament champions
- 1989, 1991, 1992, 1993, 1994, 2002, 2003, 2004, 2005, 2006

Conference regular season champions
- 1999, 2001, 2002, 2004, 2006, 2021

The Notre Dame Fighting Irish baseball team is the intercollegiate baseball team representing the University of Notre Dame in Notre Dame, Indiana. Notre Dame competes as a member of the Atlantic Coast Conference in the NCAA Division 1 college baseball league. The team is currently coached by Shawn Stiffler and plays its home games at Frank Eck Baseball Stadium, which has a capacity of 1,825. The school has appeared in three College World Series (1957, 2002, and 2022) and has won six regular season conference titles and ten conference tournament titles.

== History ==
Notre Dame baseball began in 1892. The Fighting Irish's first game was against Michigan on April 21, in which they won 6–4. They did not have a season in 1893.

In 1897, Frank E. Hering became their first coach. Frank Hering arrived at Notre Dame to play quarterback for the Fighting Irish football team in 1896. By 1898, he had taken on the responsibility of directing the entire athletic department, including coaching the football and baseball teams and introducing basketball to the university. At Notre Dame, he served as athletic director from 1898 to 1900 and coached football from 1896 to 1898, basketball from 1897, and baseball from 1897 to 1899. He has earned the title of “Father of Notre Dame Football” for his success in expanding the program from an intramural activity to a full-fledged intercollegiate sport.

Tommy Mills helmed the team to a 57–20–1 record from 1927 to 1929, good for a .737 winning percentage.

In 1934, Clarence 'Jake' Kline became the school's 15th coach for 42 seasons. He retired in 1975 at the age of 81, coaching more than 1,000 games and winning 558. He led the team to the College World Series in 1957. He was voted into the College Baseball Hall of Fame in 1968. The former Cartier Field was renamed Jake Kline Field in 1975.

In 1980, Tom Kelly set the University of Notre Dame's record for wins (29–8). He remained an athletic administrator at Notre Dame until 2003.

In 1994, the Fighting Irish moved into its state of the art, 2,500 seat Frank Eck Stadium. Moving to Notre Dame in 1995, Paul Mainieri turned the Fighting Irish into a perennial postseason contender winning the Big East tournament a record 5 straight seasons, making the NCAA tournament 9 out of 12 seasons, and leading the Irish to one College World Series appearance in 2002. He won the 2001 and 2002 Big East Coach of the Year award. In total, Mainieri posted a .714 winning percentage going 533–213–3 in 12 seasons.

Evansville's Dave Schrage then earned what he called his dream job, succeeding Mainieri as head coach at Notre Dame. Mik Aoki was named the team's 23rd head coach in team history in the summer of 2010. On June 8, 2019, Notre Dame announced that they would not renew Aoki's contract for the 2020 season.

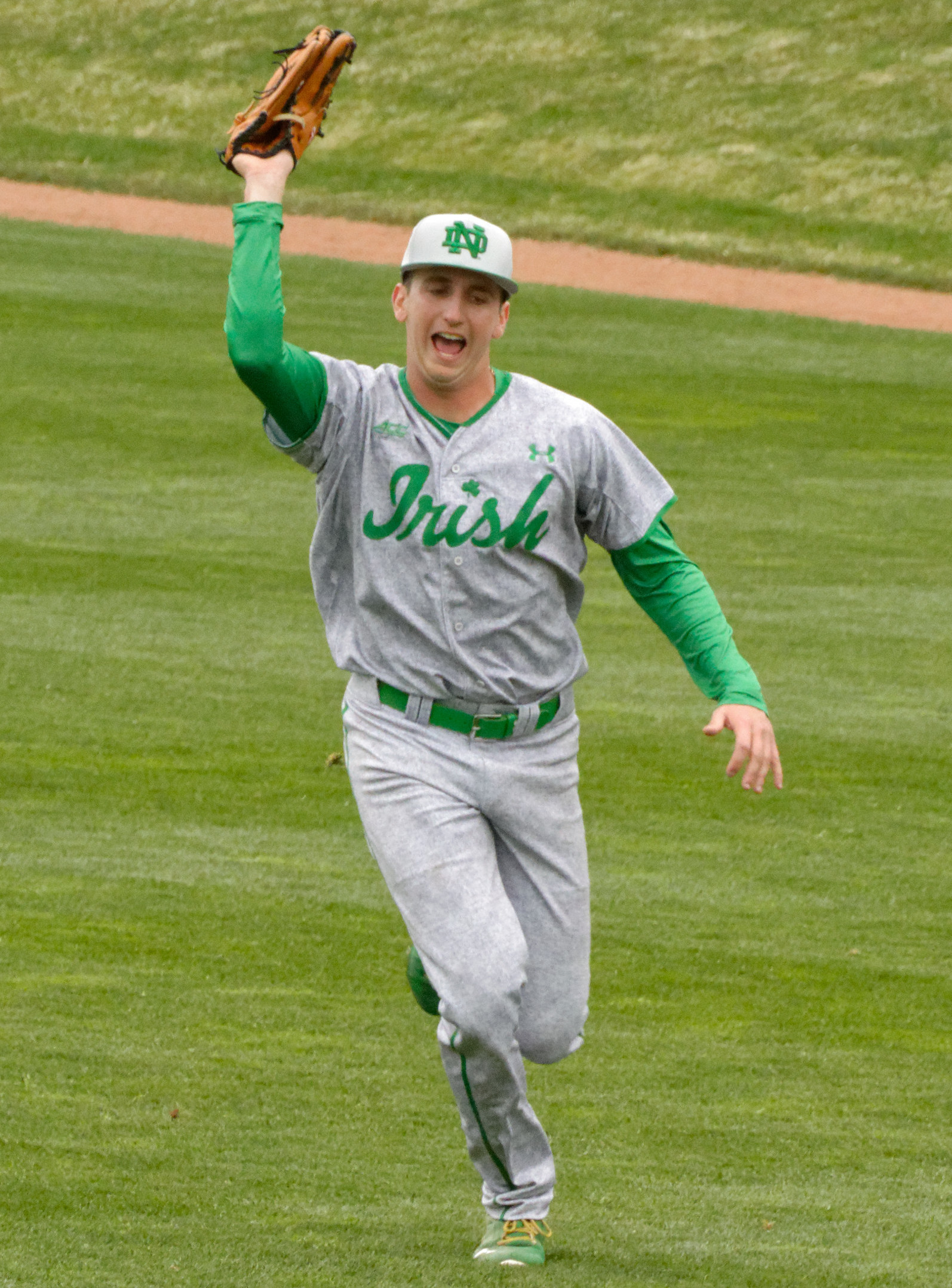
Cavan Biggio with Notre Dame in 2016

On July 12, 2019, Link Jarrett was named the 24th coach in team history. He went 11 – 2 in his first thirteen games with the Fighting Irish, but the 2020 season was cut short due to COVID-19.

During the 2021 season, Notre Dame finished with a record of 33–11 (25–10) (.755) and won the ACC Atlantic Division. Notre Dame was selected to host regionals for the first time since 2004. Michigan, UConn, and Central Michigan were all placed in the South Bend regional with Notre Dame. The Irish won the regional with a final record of 3–0. On June 5, 2021; the Irish beat UCONN in their 2nd round regional game by a score of 26–3. It was the record for the most runs scored during a playoff game in program history. The Irish advanced to the Starkville Super Regional, where they lost to eventual national champion Mississippi State.

=== Conference affiliations ===
Year	Conference
1983–1985	Midwest City Conference
1986–1995	Midwestern Collegiate Conference
1996–2013	Big East Conference
2014–present	Atlantic Coast Conference

== Coaches ==
=== All-time coaching records ===
Tenure	Coach	Seasons	Record	Pct.
1892	No coach	1	1–0	1.000
1893	No team			
1894–96	No coach	3	6–7	.462
1897–99	Frank E. Hering	3	17–7	.708
1900	Chick Stahl	1	15–2	.882
1901–02	No coach	2	27–12–1	.688
1903	Robert Lynch	1	17–5	.773
1904–05	No coach	2	18–14	.563
1906	Harry Arndt	1	20–5	.800
1907	Lou Criger	1	21–2	.913
1908–09	Harry Curtis	2	33–6	.846
1910, 1912	Ed Smith	2	38–8	.826
1911	Albert Kelly	1	17–5	.773
1913	Cy Williams	1	14–3	.824
1914–18	Jesse Harper	5	61–28	.685
1919–20	Gus Dorais	2	21–10–1	.672
1921–23	Walter Halas	3	46–21–1	.684
1924–26, 1930–33	George Keogan	7	68–57–2	.543
1927–29	Tommy Mills	3	57–20–1	.737
1934–75	Jake Kline	42	558–449–5	.554
1976–80	Tom Kelly	5	88–102–1	.463
1981–87	Larry Gallo	7	157–167–3	.485
1988–94	Pat Murphy	7	318–116–1	.732
1995–2006	Paul Mainieri	12	533–213–3	.714
2007–10	Dave Schrage	4	119–104–1	.533
2011–19	Mik Aoki	9	248–253–1	.495
2020–22	Link Jarrett	3	86–32	.729

=== Former assistant coaches ===
Tenure	Coach
1965–74	Tom Kelly
1980	Gary Tuck
1992–93	Brian Cleary
1993, 1995–99	Cory Mee
1994	Doug Schreiber
1995–2003	Brian O'Connor
2003–05	David Grewe
2005–06	Cliff Godwin
2004–06	Terry Rooney
2007–09	Sherard Clinkscales
2010	Dave Dangler

== Facilities ==
=== Frank Eck Baseball Stadium ===
Also see: Frank Eck Stadium

Frank Eck Baseball Stadium, known by fans as “The Eck”, is the home baseball stadium for the University of Notre Dame Fighting Irish baseball team. Eck Stadium is located on the southeast corner of Notre Dame's campus in Notre Dame, Indiana. Opened in 1994, Eck Stadium is 14,211-square feet, has a capacity of 2,500, and cost $5.7 million to build. The stadium has become a favorite among the Irish baseball team, and a sampling of teams from the May 7, 2006, edition of Baseball America's top-25 poll showed that Notre Dame record-setting home attendance averaged ranked 11th-highest among those elite top-25 teams. Since its construction, the stadium has hosted two NCAA Regionals, in 1999 and 2001.

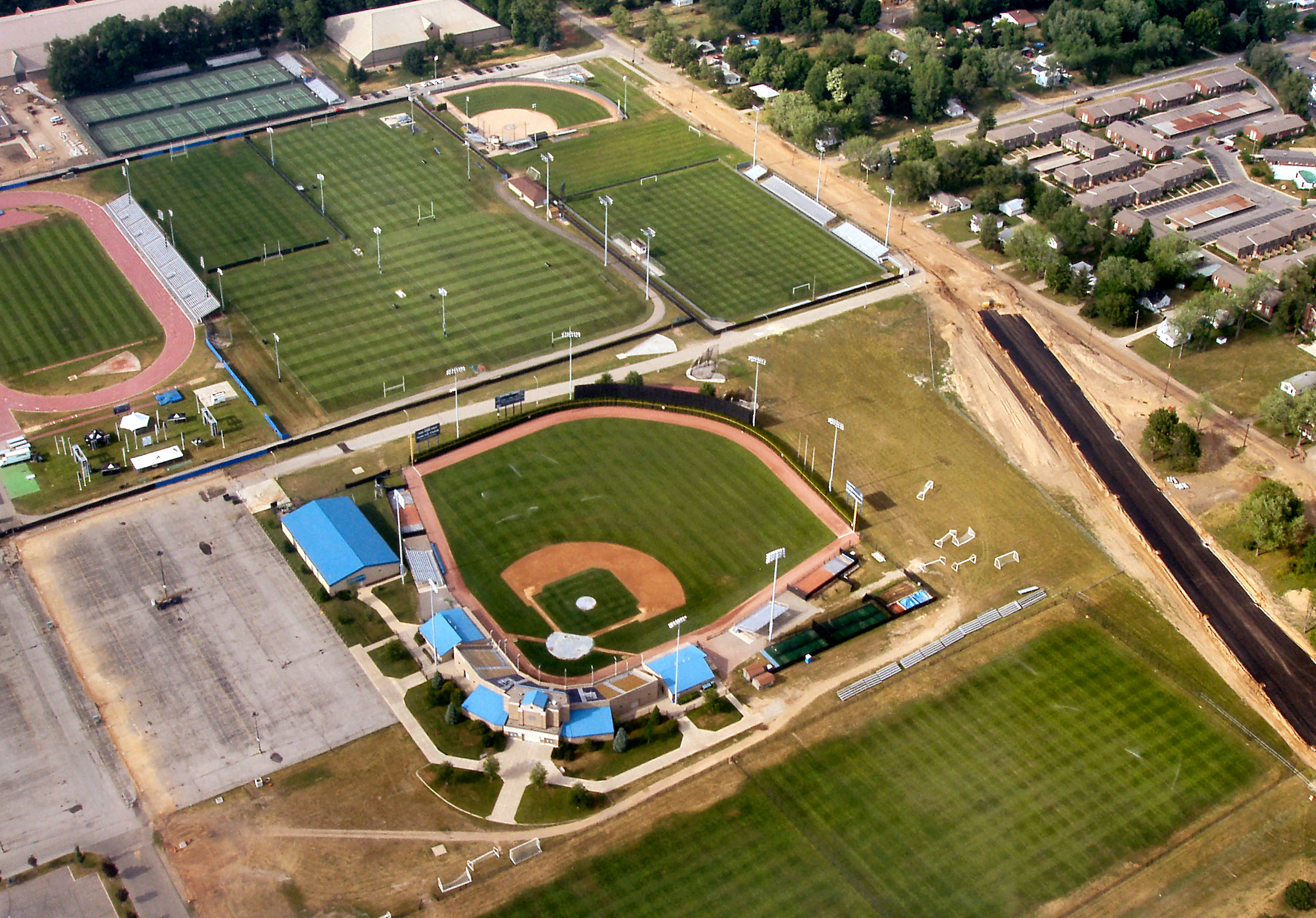
Overview of Frank Eck Baseball Stadium at the University of Notre Dame

Plans to build the stadium were announced on June 7, 1991, stemming from a private donation gift to the university by alumnus Frank Eck, and his company, Advanced Drainage Systems, Inc. of Columbus, Ohio. His contribution to Notre Dame have totaled more than $35 million, including a $21 million gift in 2005 for the Eck Hall of Law, the fifth-largest gift in Notre Dame's history. Construction on the stadium finished in Spring 1994, and the first game was played on March 17, 1994, with a 5–8 loss against the University of Tennessee.

Eck Stadium includes spacious home and visitor locker-rooms, meeting rooms, and coaching facilities. Additionally, the stadium includes a spacious press box, located directly above home plate, which seats 25 staff and media members and has a panoramic view of Eck Stadium and other Notre Dame athletic facilities. At the 1995 Notre Dame alumni game, the university named Eck Stadium's playing surface Jake Kline Field to honor the program's winningest coach.

The Eck Stadium has undergone several renovations and additions, with plans to expand in the future. In January 2000, a 9,000-square foot indoor hitting and pitching facility, located adjacent to the left-field line, was added to enable year-round practice. In 2012, this facility got a major facelift, including a wall-to-wall synthetic turf floor, four full- and two half-batting cages, permanent pitching mounds within the tunnels, and an “Iron Mike” pitching machine with an automatic ball feeder. This space is primarily used for pitching, hitting, and catching, while the team uses the Loftus Center for defensive fundamentals and base running. Additionally, the playing surface of the Jake Kline field received an upgrade before the 2014 season. The surface transitioned from natural grass to the artificial surface FieldTurf, which covers the entire field.

=== The Coach Pat Murphy Locker Room ===
The Coach Pat Murphy Locker Room was added after the 2010 season. The locker room is located within Notre Dame's Frank Eck Baseball Stadium and was included in the first major renovation endeavor since the stadium's construction in 1994. It was made possible through private donations from Daniel Murphy, David Murphy, Bert Bondi (‘67), Craig Counsell (‘92), and John Counsell (‘64), as well as the support of Notre Dame baseball.

The Coach Pat Murphy Rocker Room was designed to make the team space more efficient and improve circulation between the clubhouse, shower, restroom facilities, and the dugout. A kitchenette and mudroom were added along with direct access to and from the dugout area. The space includes 36, 30-inch wood lockers, including four specifically designed corner lockers for the catchers. New flatscreen, high definition televisions and state of the art RightView Pro technology were installed as well.

=== Cartier Athletic Field ===
Also see: Cartier Field

The Cartier Field was a stadium in Notre Dame, Indiana which existed from 1900 to 1962. The field is named after Warren Antoine Cartier, who purchase 10 acres and donated it to the university for athletic purposes and paid for the lumber required to enclose the field. Notre Dame decided the field should serve the needs of a variety of athletic endeavors such as bicycling, track, baseball, and football. The finished grounds contained a baseball diamond, two football fields, a quarter-mile banked track, a 220-yard straightway and grandstand setting for 500. On May 12, 1900, the formal opening of Cartier Athletic Field featured a track and field championship tournament followed by a baseball game.

The field hosted the University of Notre Dame Fighting Irish football team from 1900 to 1928. For more than 20 years after the football team moved out, Cartier Field remained the home of Notre Dame's baseball and track and field teams. The field was re-established in 1962, and the baseball team began to practice nearby in the Jack Kline Field.

== Notre Dame baseball during World War II ==
Despite dropping attendance at Notre Dame during the Second World War, baseball still thrived under coach Jake Kline. Over 200 men regularly showed up for tryouts during the years 1943–1945. The Fighting Irish baseball program benefitted from the presence of the Naval cadet program which contributed valuable team members. Because many schools were not able to field teams during the war years, the 1943 schedule only included eight games against universities located near Notre Dame. In 1944 and 1945, Coach Kline scheduled games against both universities and collegiate aged military teams such as the Iowa Pre-Flight School team and the Great Lakes Naval Training Center team coached by Mickey Cochrane. Major leaguers that played for Notre Dame during the Second World War included John McHale and Jackie Mayo. Notre Dame football players and Heisman Trophy winners Angelo Bertelli and Johnny Lujack suited up for the Irish during 1943 and 1944, respectively. Notre Dame's strongest team from the three years of America's involvement in the war was the 1945 squad that went 10–8–1. The 1946 squad benefitted from the return of many veterans, many of whom, such as 1944 team captain Tom Sheehan, had played for Notre Dame previously before joining the military. The 1946 team posted a record of 13–6 followed by a 16–5 record in 1947.

Notre Dame Baseball Records During WW2

Year	Record	Captain
1943	5–3	Angelo Bertelli
1944	11–11	Tom Sheehan
1945	10–8–1	Frank Gilhooley

== Notre Dame in the NCAA tournament ==
Year	Record	Pct	Notes
1949	0–2	.000	Region B
1956	1–2	.333	District 4
1957	5–3	.625	College World Series (4th place)
1958	2–2	.500	District 4
1959	2–2	.500	District 4
1960	0–2	.000	District 4
1963	1–2	.333	District 4
1970	1–2	.333	District 4
1989	1–2	.333	West II Regional
1992	3–2	.600	Atlantic Regional
1993	3–2	.600	East Regional
1994	2–2	.500	East Regional
1996	1–2	.333	South I Regional
1999	1–2	.333	South Bend Regional
2000	3–2	.600	Starkville Regional
2001	3–2	.600	South Bend Regional
2002	6–3	.667	College World Series (5th place)
2003	2–2	.500	Fullerton Regional
2004	2–2	.500	South Bend Regional
2005	2–2	.500	Gainesville Regional
2006	0–2	.000	Lexington Regional
2015	1–2	.333	Champaign Regional
2021	4–2	.667	Starkville Super Regional
2022	5–1	.833	College World Series (5th place)
TOTALS	51–49	.510	3 CWS Appearances

== Major league players ==
- Cap Anson
- John Axford
- Alfred Bergman
- Lou Bevil
- Brandon Bielak
- Cavan Biggio
- Joe Birmingham
- Joe Blong
- Joe Boyle
- Jim Brady
- Mike Brannock
- Billy Burke
- Count Campau
- Frank Carpin
- Tom Carroll
- Paul Castner
- Clem Clemens
- Craig Counsell
- Harry Curtis
- George Cutshaw
- Bert Daniels
- Packy Dillon
- Jean Dubuc
- Shaun Fitzmaurice
- Steamer Flanagan
- Bill Froats
- Norwood Gibson
- Sean Guenther
- Jim Hannan
- Ed Hanyzewski
- Aaron Heilman
- Joe Hudson
- Bert Inks
- Niko Kavadas
- Burt Keeley
- Herb Kelly
- Red Kelly
- Bill Krieg
- Ed Lagger
- Bill Lathrop
- Brad Lidge
- Adrian Lynch
- Earle Mack
- Matt Macri
- Trey Mancini
- Jeff Manship
- Jackie Mayo
- Alex McCarthy
- Ed McDonough
- Willie McGill
- Dan McGinn
- John McHale
- Trick McSorley
- Chris Michalak
- Rupert Mills
- John Mohardt
- Red Morgan
- Pat Murray
- Red Murray
- Lou Nagelsen
- Peaches O'Neill
- Hank Olmsted
- Christian Parker
- Dan Peltier
- David Phelps
- Andy Pilney
- A. J. Pollock
- Doc Powers
- Billy Reed
- Ron Reed
- Ed Reulbach
- Dick Rusteck
- Jeff Samardzija
- Frank Scanlan
- Paul Schramka
- Tillie Shafer
- Frank Shaughnessy
- Tommy Shields
- Duke Simpson
- Dan Slania
- Red Smith
- Louis Sockalexis
- Peter Solomon
- Billy Sullivan Jr.
- Yank Terry
- Henry Thielman
- Dick Thoenen
- Matt Vierling
- Ed Walsh Jr.
- John Walsh
- Kyle Weiland
- Tom Whelan
- Cy Williams
- Carl Yastrzemski

== Baseball Hall of Famers ==
Player	Position	Induction Year
Cap Anson	1B	1939
Carl Yastrzemski	OF	1989
