= Packy Dillon =

American baseball player (1853–1902)

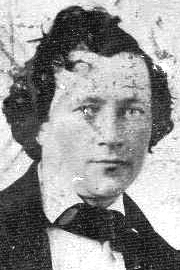
- Catcher
- Born: January 2, 1853; Saint Louis, Missouri
- Died: July 27, 1902 (aged 49); Mehlville, Missouri
- Batted: Unknown Threw: Unknown

MLB debut
- May 4, 1875, for the St. Louis Red Stockings

Last MLB appearance
- May 8, 1875, for the St. Louis Red Stockings

MLB statistics
- Home runs: 0
- Runs batted in: 1
- Batting average: .231

Teams
- St. Louis Red Stockings (1875)

Patrick Henry Dillon (January 2, 1853 – July 27, 1902) was an American professional catcher who played for the 1875 St. Louis Red Stockings of the National Association. Dillon was born in Saint Louis, Missouri. His brother, John Dillon, also played for the Red Stockings in the same season.

Dillon, was born in Mehlville Missouri which is a few miles south of downtown St.Louis. His parents had emigrated from Ireland about a decade earlier. In 1872 Packy enrolled at The University of Notre Dame but he did not end up graduating from the school and instead moved back to St.Louis.

The Red Stockings were an amateur baseball team from Saint Louis that had decided to turn professional in 1875. But the Red Stockings survived only part of the season (18 games), as the club played its final game on July 4.

In his only season for St. Louis, Dillon shared catching duties with Silver Flint. He posted a .231 average (3-for-13) in three games, hitting a double and driving in one run while scoring one time. After the few games with St. Louis Dillon and several of his teammates went to play for a team in Kentucky.

After his professional baseball career Dillon became a butcher.

Dillon died in Mehlville, Missouri, at the age of 49 from heart disease.
