= Craig Counsell =

American baseball player and manager (born 1970)

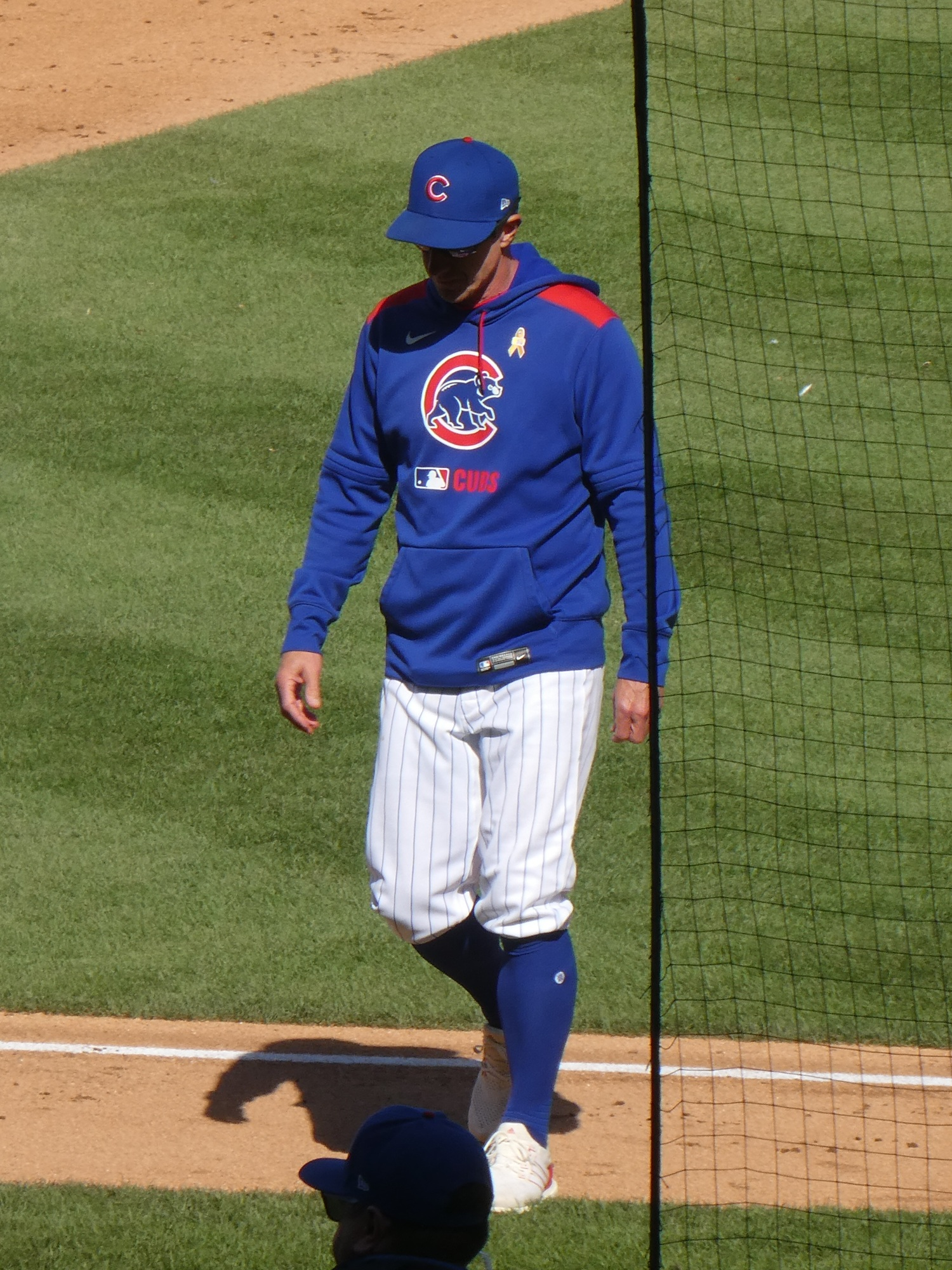
- Counsell with the Chicago Cubs

Chicago Cubs – No. 11
- Infielder / Manager
- Born: August 21, 1970 (age 56); South Bend, Indiana, U.S.
- Batted: Left Threw: Right

MLB debut
- September 17, 1995, for the Colorado Rockies

Last MLB appearance
- September 28, 2011, for the Milwaukee Brewers

MLB statistics (through June 23, 2026)
- Batting average: .255
- Home runs: 42
- Runs batted in: 390
- Managerial record: 922–811
- Winning %: .532
- Stats at Baseball Reference
- Managerial record at Baseball Reference

Teams
- As player: Colorado Rockies (1995, 1997); Florida Marlins (1997–1999); Los Angeles Dodgers (1999); Arizona Diamondbacks (2000–2003); Milwaukee Brewers (2004); Arizona Diamondbacks (2005–2006); Milwaukee Brewers (2007–2011); As manager: Milwaukee Brewers (2015–2023); Chicago Cubs (2024–present)

Career highlights and awards
- 2× World Series champion (1997, 2001); NLCS MVP (2001); Milwaukee Brewers Wall of Honor

Craig John Counsell (born August 21, 1970) is an American former professional baseball infielder and the current manager for the Chicago Cubs of Major League Baseball (MLB). He was previously the manager for the Milwaukee Brewers and holds the franchise's record for managerial wins. He led the team to five post-season appearances, winning one playoff series. After joining the Cubs he led them to consecutive playoff appearances in 2025 and 2026.

Counsell was an infielder who played 16 seasons in MLB for five teams, and was known for his unique batting stance. He won the 1997 World Series with the Florida Marlins, batting in the tying run and scoring the winning run. He was named the NLCS Most Valuable Player in 2001, and was on-base for the Arizona Diamondbacks when they subsequently won the World Series.

== Early life ==
Counsell was born in South Bend, Indiana. He grew up in Whitefish Bay, Wisconsin, and attended Whitefish Bay High School, where he played baseball. His father, John, worked for the Milwaukee Brewers as their director of the speakers bureau and community relations. Counsell attended the University of Notre Dame, where he played for the Notre Dame Fighting Irish baseball team. He was an infielder for the Irish, with a career batting average of .306, 204 runs, 166 RBI, 50 doubles and twice as many walks (166) as strikeouts (82), graduating in 1992.

== Professional career ==
The Colorado Rockies selected Craig Counsell in the 11th round of the 1992 MLB draft. He made his MLB debut with the Rockies on September 17, 1995, appearing in only three games that season. In July 1997, the Rockies traded Counsell to the Florida Marlins for relief pitcher Mark Hutton. Counsell quickly became the Marlins’ starting second baseman and played a pivotal role in their 1997 World Series victory, a 4–3 series win over the Cleveland Indians. In Game 7, he drove in the tying run with a sacrifice fly in the bottom of the 9th inning and scored the winning run on Édgar Rentería's walk-off single in the bottom of the 11th inning.

In June 1999, the Marlins traded Counsell to the Los Angeles Dodgers for a player to be named later (minor leaguer Ryan Moskau). The Dodgers released Counsell during 2000 spring training, and he signed with the Arizona Diamondbacks. His stay with the Diamondbacks lasted four years. Counsell batted 8-for-21 (.381) with 4 runs batted in (RBIs) and 5 runs in the 2001 National League Championship Series (NLCS), and won the NLCS Most Valuable Player Award. He was hit by a pitch by Mariano Rivera to load the bases for Luis Gonzalez in the bottom of the 9th inning of Game 7 of the 2001 World Series, after which Gonzalez drove in the winning run for the Diamondbacks, a bloop single over the drawn-in infield.

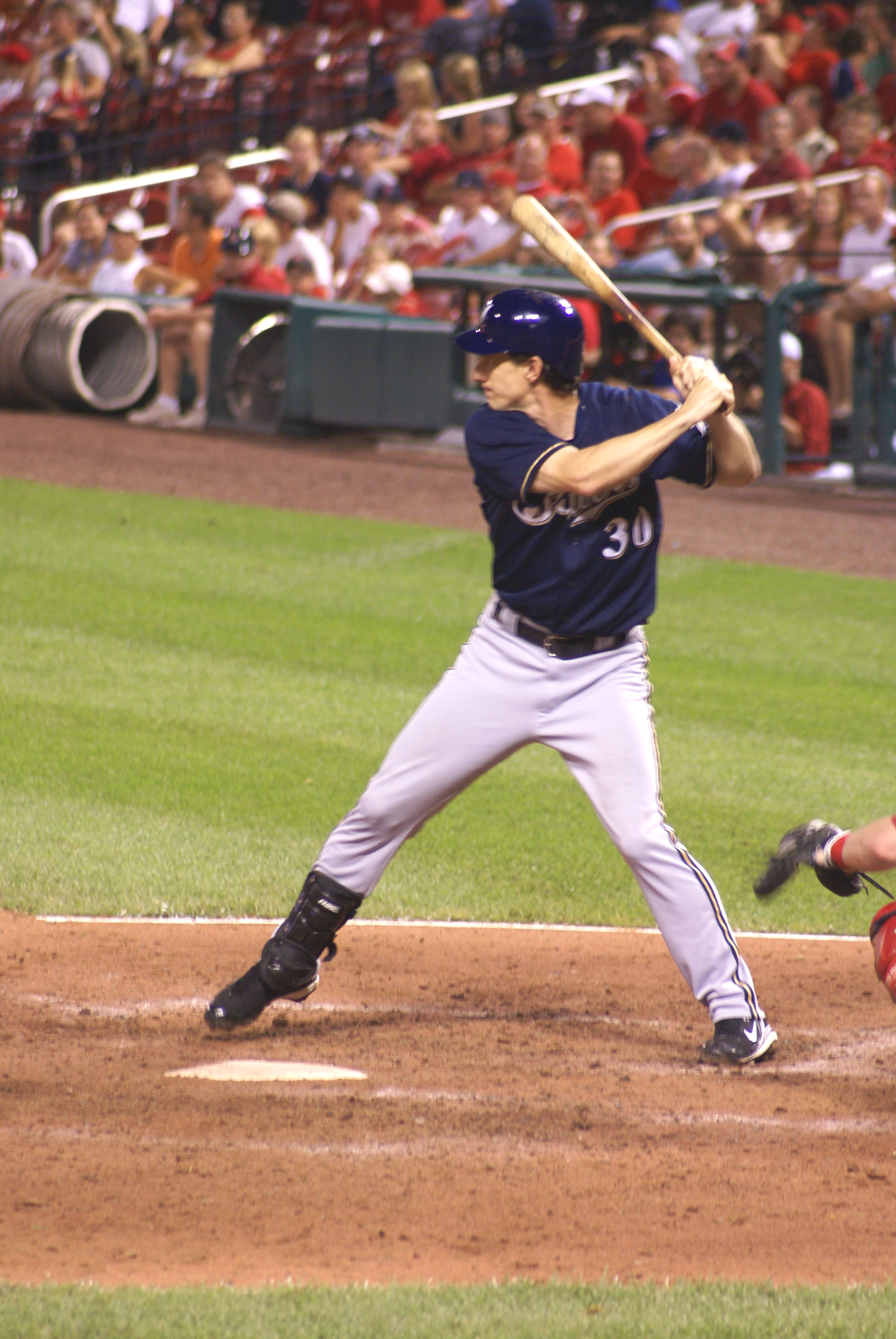
Counsell batting for the Milwaukee Brewers

After the 2003 season, the Diamondbacks traded Counsell to the Milwaukee Brewers, with Chris Capuano, Chad Moeller, Lyle Overbay, Jorge de la Rosa, and Junior Spivey, for Richie Sexson, Shane Nance, and a player to be named later (minor leaguer Noochie Varner). With the Brewers, Counsell started at shortstop in 2004. After one season with the Brewers, Counsell returned to the Diamondbacks as a free agent for two more seasons.

Counsell returned to the Brewers as a free agent for 2007 and filled the role of utility infielder. He recorded his 1,000th career hit on August 16, 2008, against Derek Lowe of the Los Angeles Dodgers. In 2011, he was the fourth-oldest player in the National League, and had the second-best career fielding percentage of all active second basemen (.991). In 2009, Counsell gained more regular playing time due to injuries and inconsistent play from other Brewers players, and had a .285 batting average, along with 8 triples, finishing in the top 10 in the National League in the latter category.

In 2010, Counsell was chosen as the 13th-smartest athlete in sports by Sporting News.

From June 11 to August 3, 2011, Counsell tied the all-time record for consecutive at-bats without a base hit for a position player, going hitless over a streak of 45 at-bats as a bench player and spot starter. The record was set by notoriously poor hitter Bill Bergen in 1909, and later tied by infielder Dave Campbell in 1973. It had been reported Bergen's streak was 46 at bats; however, subsequent research definitively established that Bergen's streak stopped at 45, meaning that Counsell tied but did not break the record. The record was broken only a few weeks after Counsell tied it, by Eugenio Vélez of the Los Angeles Dodgers.

=== Batting stance ===
For much of his career, Counsell had a distinctive batting stance, usually holding his bat high, with his arms fully extended above his head. As he reached the end of his career, Counsell lowered his bat more in his stance, though he would nearly have his back to the pitcher, to where the number on his back was almost completely visible to the pitcher. Counsell also didn't wear batting gloves for the majority of his career, with the exception of his rookie season and his final season.

=== Fielding ===
By the SAFE: Spatial Aggregate Fielding Evaluation method of evaluating defense, Counsell was both the highest-rated second baseman and the highest-rated third baseman over the period from 2002 to 2008, with an average runs saved of 10.18 and 5.86, respectively.

Primarily known as a second baseman, shortstop, and third baseman, Counsell also played four games at first base, with two games in 2001 and two in 2003 for the Diamondbacks. He even spent part of a game in left field for the Brewers in 2011, playing two innings without recording any total chances.

== Post-playing career ==
In early 2012, Counsell retired as a professional baseball player, and took a front office position with the Brewers. Counsell served as special assistant to general manager Doug Melvin. In 2014, Counsell was named a part-time color analyst for Brewers radio broadcasts. He rotated with Darryl Hamilton and Jerry Augustine to call games with Joe Block when primary announcer Bob Uecker was absent.

== Managerial career ==
=== Milwaukee Brewers ===
On May 4, 2015, Counsell was hired by the Brewers to become their manager after Ron Roenicke was fired the day before. He signed a three-year contract with the team. The Brewers, going through a rebuild, went 61–76 and 73–89 under Counsell in his first two seasons as manager.

In 2017, the team went on a surprising run, going 86–76. They finished 2nd in the NL Central, falling one win short of a wild card berth. Counsell finished fourth in NL Manager of the Year voting.

In their 2018 campaign, the Brewers went 96–67 under Counsell in the regular season and won the NL Central by defeating the Chicago Cubs by a score of 3–1 in a tiebreaker game. In 2018, he was successful on the lowest percentage of replay challenges than any other MLB manager with 10 or more challenges at 20.6%. The Brewers advanced to the National League Championship Series after a sweep of the Colorado Rockies in the National League Division Series. The Brewers won the first and sixth games of the 2018 National League Championship Series against the Los Angeles Dodgers at Miller Park in Milwaukee and the third game of the series at Dodger Stadium in Los Angeles, before falling to the Dodgers in seven games. Counsell thus became only the second Brewers manager to lead the team to the postseason after managing a full season with the team. After the season ended, he finished runner-up in NL Manager of the Year voting, losing to Atlanta Braves manager Brian Snitker.

On September 18, 2021, Counsell won his 500th game as a manager, a 6–4 Brewers victory over the Chicago Cubs. He finished 2nd in NL Manager of the Year voting, losing to San Francisco Giants manager Gabe Kapler, with one first place vote, 22 second place votes, and four third place votes.

On June 15, 2022, with a win over the New York Mets, Counsell passed Phil Garner (563) for most wins as a Brewers manager.

On September 19, 2023, Counsell won his 700th game as a manager, a 7–3 Brewers victory over the St. Louis Cardinals.

Counsell's contract with the Brewers expired on November 1, 2023.

=== Chicago Cubs ===
On November 6, 2023, Counsell was hired as the manager of the Chicago Cubs on a five-year contract worth over $40 million, making him the highest-paid manager in Major League Baseball history, both in annual average value and total value. The move was described as a surprise by observers, who had expected Counsell to sign with the New York Mets or Cleveland Guardians if he did not remain with the Brewers.

As a result of Counsell's unexpected move to the Cubs, the sign for Craig Counsell Park, located in his hometown of Whitefish Bay, was vandalized.

He was also greeted with a swarm of booing from fans upon his return to American Family Field in May 2024.

The Cubs finished the 2024 season with an 83–79 record, tied with their record from the year prior and ultimately missing the playoffs.

The Cubs finished the 2025 season with a 92–70 record, finishing second in the Central division. They lost to the Brewers in the NLDS.

Counsell earned his 900th career win as a manager on April 29, 2026, with a Cubs victory over the San Diego Padres. The Cubs were swept by the San Diego Padres in the National League Wild Card series.

=== Managerial record ===
As of games played on June 23, 2026

Team	Year	Regular season					Postseason			
Team	Year	Games	Won	Lost	Win %	Finish	Won	Lost	Win %	Result
MIL	2015	137	61	76	.445	4th in NL Central	–	–	–	–
MIL	2016	162	73	89	.451	4th in NL Central	–	–	–	–
MIL	2017	162	86	76	.531	2nd in NL Central	–	–	–	–
MIL	2018	163	96	67	.589	1st in NL Central	6	4	.600	Lost NLCS (LAD)
MIL	2019	162	89	73	.549	2nd in NL Central	0	1	.000	Lost NLWC (WAS)
MIL	2020	60	29	31	.483	4th in NL Central	0	2	.000	Lost NLWC (LAD)
MIL	2021	162	95	67	.586	1st in NL Central	1	3	.250	Lost NLDS (ATL)
MIL	2022	162	86	76	.531	2nd in NL Central	–	–	–	–
MIL	2023	162	92	70	.568	1st in NL Central	0	2	.000	Lost NLWC (ARI)
MIL total		1,332	707	625	.531		7	12	.368	
CHC	2024	162	83	79	.512	3rd in NL Central	–	–	–	–
CHC	2025	162	92	70	.568	2nd in NL Central	4	4	.500	Lost NLDS (MIL)
CHC	2026	162	89	73	.549	2nd in NL Central	0	2	.000	Lost NLWC (SD)
CHC total		486	264	222	.543		4	6	.400	
Total		1,818	971	847	.534		11	18	.379	

== Personal life ==
Counsell and his wife, Michelle, have four children together. The family resides in Whitefish Bay, Wisconsin. Counsell's oldest son, Brady, played college baseball at the University of Kansas and was drafted with the 303rd pick in the 2025 MLB draft by the Arizona Diamondbacks. His younger son, Jack, was on Whitefish Bay High School's state championship baseball team in 2023 and played baseball at the University of Michigan but has since transferred to Northwestern.

== See also ==
- Arizona Diamondbacks award winners and league leaders
- Notre Dame Fighting Irish baseball statistical leaders
- List of Major League Baseball managers with most career ejections
