= Joe Blong =

American baseball player (1853–1892)

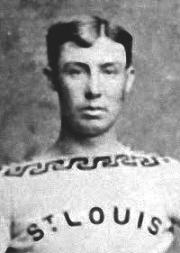
- Outfielder / Pitcher
- Born: September 17, 1853; St. Louis, Missouri, U.S.
- Died: September 17, 1892 (aged 39); St. Louis, Missouri, U.S.
- Batted: Right Threw: Right

MLB debut
- May 4, 1875, for the St. Louis Red Stockings

Last MLB appearance
- October 6, 1877, for the St. Louis Brown Stockings

MLB statistics
- Batting average: .216
- Home runs: 0
- Runs batted in: 48
- Win–loss record: 13-21
- Earned run average: 2.84
- Strikeouts: 65
- Stats at Baseball Reference

Teams
- St. Louis Red Stockings (1875); St. Louis Brown Stockings (1876–1877)

Joseph Myles Blong (September 17, 1853 – September 17, 1892) was an American professional baseball player who played pitcher and outfield from 1875 to 1877.

== Playing career ==
He attended the University of Notre Dame in the 1860s. After graduating, Blong signed to play for the St. Louis Red Stockings of the National Association. He was one of two starting pitchers for St. Louis, the other being Pidgey Morgan. Blong had the misfortune for playing with one of the worst teams in the league. Short on overall talent, St. Louis limped to a 4-15 record, finishing 10th among the 13 teams in the league. Blong went 3-12 in his rookie season, with an E.R.A. 3.07. Blong surrendered 121 runs off 169 hits. He did manage to score one shutout during the season.

The Red Stockings folded after that season. Blong played for the St. Louis Brown Stockings in the newly formed National League. Ineffective as a pitcher, Blong was shifted to outfield full-time. His previous season, he only played outfield on days he wasn't scheduled to pitch. His rookie season in the National Association, Blong hit a paltry .147. While not impressive, he did raise his average to .235. During the season, Blong was called upon to relieve starting pitcher George Bradley. While he did not get a win nor save, Blong finished the game and allowed only two hits over four innings.

The next season, Blong was the only holdover from the starting outfield to play for the team, with Jack Remsen and Mike Dorgan replacing Lip Pike and Ned Cuthbert. St. Louis finished in 3rd with a 45-19 record. While it was the first time Blong played for a winning team, all of Blongs statistics dropped and he was waived at the end of the season.

Blong tried to extend his career over the next two seasons playing in the minor leagues, but after a season with Davenport in the Northwestern League, his career was over.
