= 2017 Little League World Series =

Children's baseball tournament

Tournament details
- Dates: August 17–August 27
- Teams: 16

Final positions
- Champions: Tokyo Kitasuna Little League; Tokyo, Japan
- Runners-up: (United States) Lufkin Little League; Lufkin, Texas

The 2017 Little League World Series was held from August 17 through August 27 in South Williamsport, Pennsylvania. Eight teams from the United States and eight teams from around the world competed in the 71st edition of the Little League World Series. Tokyo Kitasuna Little League of Tokyo, Japan, defeated Lufkin Little League of Lufkin, Texas, in the championship game by a 12–2 score. It was the 11th time that a team from Japan won the tournament. Tokyo Kitasuna became the first league to win the tournament four times.

== Teams ==
Regional qualifying tournaments were held between June and August 2017.

United States	International
(Michigan) Grosse Pointe Woods, Michigan; Great Lakes Region; Grosse Pointe Woods-Shores Little League	Seoul, South Korea; Asia-Pacific and Middle East Region; West Seoul Little League
(New Jersey) Jackson, New Jersey; Mid-Atlantic Region; Holbrook Little League	Sydney, New South Wales; Australia Region; Hills Little League
(South Dakota) Sioux Falls, South Dakota; Midwest Region; Sioux Falls Little League	White Rock, British Columbia; Canada Region; White Rock South Surrey Little League
(Connecticut) Fairfield, Connecticut; New England Region; Fairfield American Little League	(Dominican Republic) Santiago de los Caballeros, Dominican Republic; Caribbean Region; Los Bravos de Pontezuela Little League
(Washington (state)) Walla Walla, Washington; Northwest Region; Walla Walla Valley Little League	(Italy) Emilia, Italy; Europe and Africa Region; Emilia Little League
(North Carolina) Greenville, North Carolina; Southeast Region; North State Little League	Tokyo; Japan Region; Tokyo Kitasuna Little League
Lufkin, Texas (The Thundering 13); Southwest Region; Lufkin Little League	(Venezuela) Maracaibo, Venezuela; Latin America Region; Luz Maracaibo Little League
(California) Rancho Santa Margarita, California; West Region; Santa Margarita National Little League	Reynosa, Tamaulipas; Mexico Region; Guadalupe Treviño Kelly Little League

== Results ==
The draw to determine the opening round pairings took place on June 15, 2017.

=== United States bracket ===
Upper round 1	Upper round 2	Upper final	Final
August 17 – Game 2
New Jersey	6
August 20 – Game 14
Connecticut	7
Connecticut	3
August 17 – Game 4
Texas	6
Texas	5
August 23 – Game 24 (F/7)
Michigan	1
Texas	1
August 18 – Game 6
North Carolina	2
(Washington (state)) Washington	0
August 20 – Game 16 (F/5)
California	9
California	0
August 18 – Game 8
North Carolina	16
South Dakota	0	August 26 – U.S. championship
North Carolina	6	North Carolina	5
Texas	6
Lower round 1	Lower round 2	Lower round 3	Lower final
August 21 – Game 18
August 19 – Game 10 (F/4)	California	9	August 24 – Game 26 (F/5)
New Jersey	15	New Jersey	12	August 23 – Game 22 (F/5)	Texas	14
Michigan	5	New Jersey	2	Connecticut	4
August 21 – Game 20	Connecticut	12
August 19 – Game 12	Connecticut	14
Washington	4	Washington	6
South Dakota	3

=== International bracket ===
Upper round 1	Upper round 2	Upper final	Final
August 17 – Game 1
Venezuela	4
August 20 – Game 13
Mexico	1
Venezuela	3
August 17 – Game 3 (F/4)
Canada	7
Canada	12
August 23 – Game 23 (F/5)
Italy	2
Canada	0
August 18 – Game 5
Japan	10
Japan	8
August 20 – Game 15
Australia	0
Japan	4
August 18 – Game 7
South Korea	1
Dominican Republic	1	August 26 – International championship
South Korea	10	Japan	5
Mexico	0
Lower round 1	Lower round 2	Lower round 3	Lower final
August 21 – Game 17
August 19 – Game 9 (F/4)	South Korea	0	August 24 – Game 25
Mexico	13	Mexico	1	August 22 – Game 21	Canada	2
Italy	0	Mexico	8	Mexico	6
August 21 – Game 19	Venezuela	0
August 19 – Game 11	Venezuela	3
Australia	7	Dominican Republic	2
Dominican Republic	8

=== Crossover games ===
Teams that lost their first two games played a crossover game against a team from the other side of the bracket that also lost its first two games. These games were labeled Game A and Game B. This provided teams who were already eliminated the opportunity to play a third game.

Game A
August 21 – Lamade Stadium
Italy	7
Michigan	11

Game B
August 22 – Lamade Stadium
Australia	11
South Dakota	7

=== Third place game ===
This consolation game is played between the loser of the United States championship and the loser of the International championship.

Third place game
August 27 – Lamade Stadium
Mexico	14
North Carolina	8

=== World Championship ===
Little League World Championship
August 27 – Lamade Stadium (F/5)
Texas	2
Japan	12

2017 Little League World Series Champions
Tokyo Kitasuna Little League
Tokyo, Japan

== Champions path ==
The Kitasuna LL reached the LLWS with a record of nine wins and only one loss. In total, their record was 14–1.

Round	Opposition	Result
All-Tokyo Tournament
Opening Round	Chofu LL	17–2
Quarterfinals	Fuji LL	14–1
Semifinals	Inagi LL	11–0 (F/5)
Winners Bracket Final	Nakano LL	5–6
All-Tokyo Round Robin Playoff
Game 1	Chofu LL	9–7
Game 2	Hachioji LL	13–0 (F/4)
Japan Regional Tournament
Opening Round	(Hiroshima Prefecture) Hiroshima Nishi LL	12–1 (F/4)
Quarterfinals	(Gifu Prefecture) Gifu Tohno LL	16–2 (F/6)
Semifinals	(Osaka Prefecture) Osaka Namihaya LL	4–1
Finals	(Chiba Prefecture) Chiba City LL	17–0 (F/4)

== Notable players ==
- Ángel Genao (Dominican Republic) - Infielder for the Cleveland Guardians
- Ryuto Konno (Japan) - professional baseball pitcher
- Marcus Phillips (South Dakota) - drafted by the Boston Red Sox in the 2025 Major League Baseball draft
- Jack Radel (South Dakota) - drafted by the Houston Astros in the 2026 Major League Baseball draft
- Griffin Wilde (South Dakota) - football player for the Northwestern Wildcats

== MLB Little League Classic ==
On March 9, 2017, Major League Baseball (MLB) and Lycoming County officials announced that Williamsport would host a regular season MLB game during the LLWS, branded as the MLB Little League Classic. The game took place on August 20, 2017, at BB&T Ballpark at Historic Bowman Field and was attended by the Little Leaguers and their families, along with select Lycoming County residents. The game featured the St. Louis Cardinals and the Pittsburgh Pirates, and was televised on ESPN (as part of Sunday Night Baseball), ESPN Deportes, and MLB Network. The Pirates won, 6–3.
