= Tom Oran =

American baseball player (1847–1886)

- Outfielder
- Born: c. 1847; California
- Died: September 22, 1886 (aged 38–39); St. Louis, Missouri
- Batted: Unknown Threw: Unknown

MLB debut
- May 4, 1875, for the St. Louis Red Stockings

Last MLB appearance
- July 4, 1875, for the St. Louis Red Stockings

MLB statistics
- Batting average: .185
- Home runs: 0
- Runs batted in: 10
- Stats at Baseball Reference

Teams
- St. Louis Red Stockings (1875)

Thomas Oran (c. 1847 – September 22, 1886), also known as "Lusher Tom" and "Indian Tom", was an American outfielder in Major League Baseball. After playing amateur baseball for a few years, he played for the St. Louis Red Stockings in 1875 and was the first Native American in the major leagues.

== Biography ==
Oran was born in California. He played baseball for several amateur baseball teams in St. Louis, Missouri, in the late 1860s, including the Olympics and Unions, and in 1869 he joined the Empire Club as a catcher. During this time, he also worked as a city firefighter.

Oran switched from the catcher position to third base in early 1871. The Empires held the local championship until 1873, and Oran remained on the team during this time. In 1874, he jumped to another team, the Red Stockings. The Red Stockings joined the National Association – now regarded as the first major league – in February of the following year, and Oran played in all 19 of his team's games from May 4 to July 4. His fielding percentage as an outfielder and shortstop was just .636, but he led the Red Stockings with 10 runs batted in and 1 triple, while batting .185 and stealing 3 bases. Oran was the first Native American in Major League Baseball. The National Association folded after the 1875 season, and he never played professional baseball again.

Oran was married with one son, also named Thomas. He died in 1886 and was buried in Calvary Cemetery in St. Louis. Four years later, The Sporting News wrote that, "Oran was a half-breed Indian and died from the effects of fire water." According to the 1870 United States census, however, both of his parents were of foreign birth.
