= John Dillon (baseball) =

American baseball player

- Shortstop
- Born: c.1850 St. Louis, Missouri
- Batted: Unknown Threw: Unknown

MLB debut
- May 8, 1875, for the St. Louis Red Stockings

Last MLB appearance
- May 8, 1875, for the St. Louis Red Stockings

MLB statistics
- At bats: 1
- RBI: 0
- Home Runs: 0
- Batting average: .000
- Stats at Baseball Reference

Teams
- St. Louis Red Stockings (1875)

John Dillon (born c.1850) was an American professional baseball shortstop who played in one game for the 1875 St. Louis Red Stockings. His brother Packy Dillon also played for the Red Stockings.
