= Jack Radel =

American baseball player (born 2004)

Houston Astros
- Pitcher
- Born: September 14, 2004 (age 21); Sioux Falls, South Dakota, U.S.
- Bats: Right Throws: Right
- Stats at Baseball Reference

Jack Randolph Radel (born September 14, 2004) is an American professional baseball pitcher in the Houston Astros organization. He played college baseball for the for the Notre Dame Fighting Irish.

== Amateur career ==
Radel played in the 2017 Little League World Series for South Dakota. He attended Roosevelt High School in Sioux Falls, South Dakota. Radel committed to play college baseball at the University of Notre Dame.

As a freshman at Notre Dame in 2024, Radel appeared in 14 games with 10 starts and went 4–3 with a 4.58 earned run average (ERA) and 39 strikeouts over 53 innings. As a sophomore in 2025, he started 13 games and went 7–4 with a 3.58 ERA and 60 strikeouts over 70 1/3 innings. Radel was Notre Dame's number one starter his junior year in 2026, going 8–3 with a 3.29 ERA and 116 strikeouts in 87 2/3 innings over 15 starts. He was named first team All-ACC and a third team All-American.

== Professional career ==
Radel was considered a top prospect in the 2026 Major League Baseball draft. He was drafted 28th overall by the Houston Astros in the draft. On July 22, he signed with the Astros for a signing bonus of $3 million.

== Personal life ==
Radel and Marcus Phillips have been noted to be best friends since playing together in Sioux Falls Little League through high school.
