= Charlie Hautz =

American baseball player (1852–1929)

- First baseman
- Born: February 5, 1852; St. Louis, Missouri, U.S.
- Died: January 24, 1929 (aged 76); St. Louis, Missouri, U.S.
- Batted: Right Threw: Unknown

MLB debut
- May 4, 1875, for the St. Louis Red Stockings

Last MLB appearance
- September 4, 1884, for the Pittsburgh Alleghenys

MLB statistics
- At bats: 107
- RBI: 4
- Home runs: 0
- Batting average: .280
- Stats at Baseball Reference

Teams
- St. Louis Red Stockings (1875); Pittsburgh Alleghenys (1884)

Charles A. Hautz (February 5, 1852 – January 24, 1929) was an American professional baseball player who played first base for the 1875 St. Louis Red Stockings and the 1884 Pittsburgh Alleghenys.
