= Trick McSorley =

American baseball player (1852–1936)

- Infielder/Outfielder
- Born: December 6, 1852; St. Louis, Missouri, U.S.
- Died: February 9, 1936 (aged 83); St. Louis, Missouri, U.S.
- Batted: Right Threw: Right

MLB debut
- May 6, 1875, for the St. Louis Red Stockings

Last MLB appearance
- May 6, 1886, for the St. Louis Browns

MLB statistics
- Batting average: .233
- Home runs: 0
- Runs scored: 19
- Stats at Baseball Reference

Teams
- St. Louis Red Stockings (1875); Toledo Blue Stockings (1884); St. Louis Maroons (1885); St. Louis Browns (1886)

John Bernard "Trick" McSorley (December 6, 1852 – February 9, 1936) was an American professional baseball player. He played all or part of four seasons in Major League Baseball for the St. Louis Red Stockings of the National Association, the St. Louis Maroons of the National League and the Toledo Blue Stockings and St. Louis Browns of the American Association between 1875 and 1886. He played six different positions, including pitcher, but mostly played at first base, third base and left field.

He was apparently removed from the Red Stockings team because of "crooked play", but returned several years later for Toledo.

He died in his home town of St. Louis, Missouri in 1936 of a cerebral hemorrhage.
