= Pidgey Morgan =

American baseball player (1853–1910)

- Outfielder
- Born: May 1853; Missouri
- Died: January 30, 1910 (aged 56); St. Louis, Missouri
- Batted: Unknown Threw: Unknown

MLB debut
- May 4, 1875, for the St. Louis Red Stockings

Last MLB appearance
- June 22, 1878, for the Milwaukee Grays

MLB statistics
- At bats: 125
- Runs batted in: 6
- Home runs: 0
- Batting average: .232
- Stats at Baseball Reference

Teams
- St. Louis Red Stockings (1875); Milwaukee Grays (1878)

Daniel "Pidgey" Morgan (May 1853–January 30, 1910) was an American professional baseball player who played outfield for the 1875 St. Louis Red Stockings and the 1878 Milwaukee Grays.
