= Red Stocking Baseball Park =

Former baseball grounds in St. Louis, Missouri

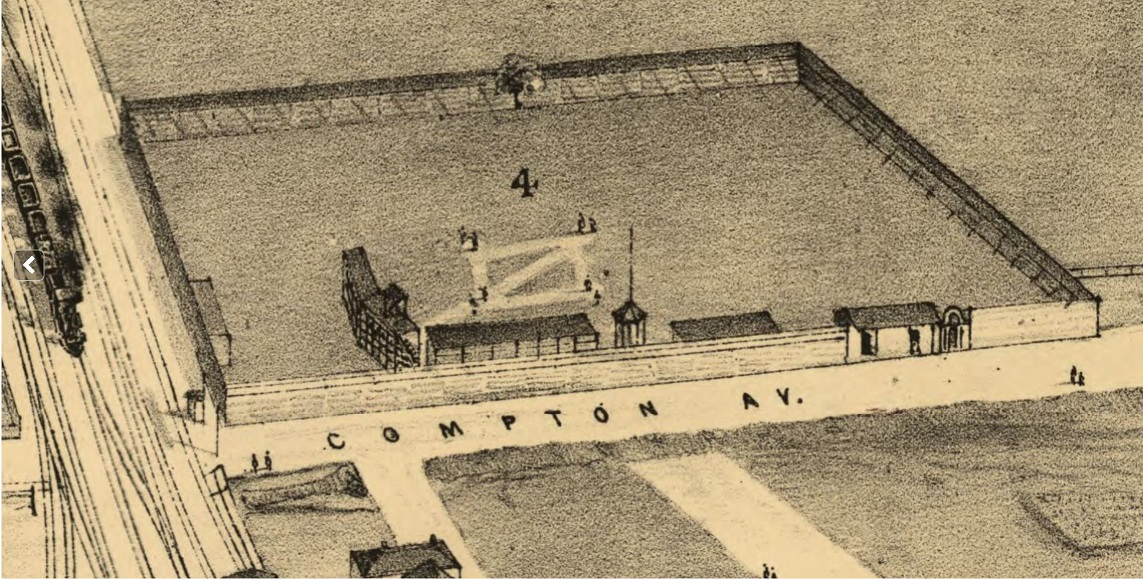
- Drawing of the ballpark, 1875
- Interactive map of Red Stocking Baseball Park
- Former names: Veto Grounds
- Address: 701 S. Compton; St. Louis, Missouri; United States
- Coordinates: 38.6274°N 90.2292°W
- Owner: David J. Ranken, director of the Missouri Pacific Railroad and later of the Louisiana Purchase Exposition
- Seating type: Grandstand
- Capacity: Roughly 1,000 in 1875

Construction
- Built: 1874
- Opened: 1875
- Demolished: ca. 1898

Tenant
- St. Louis Red Stockings

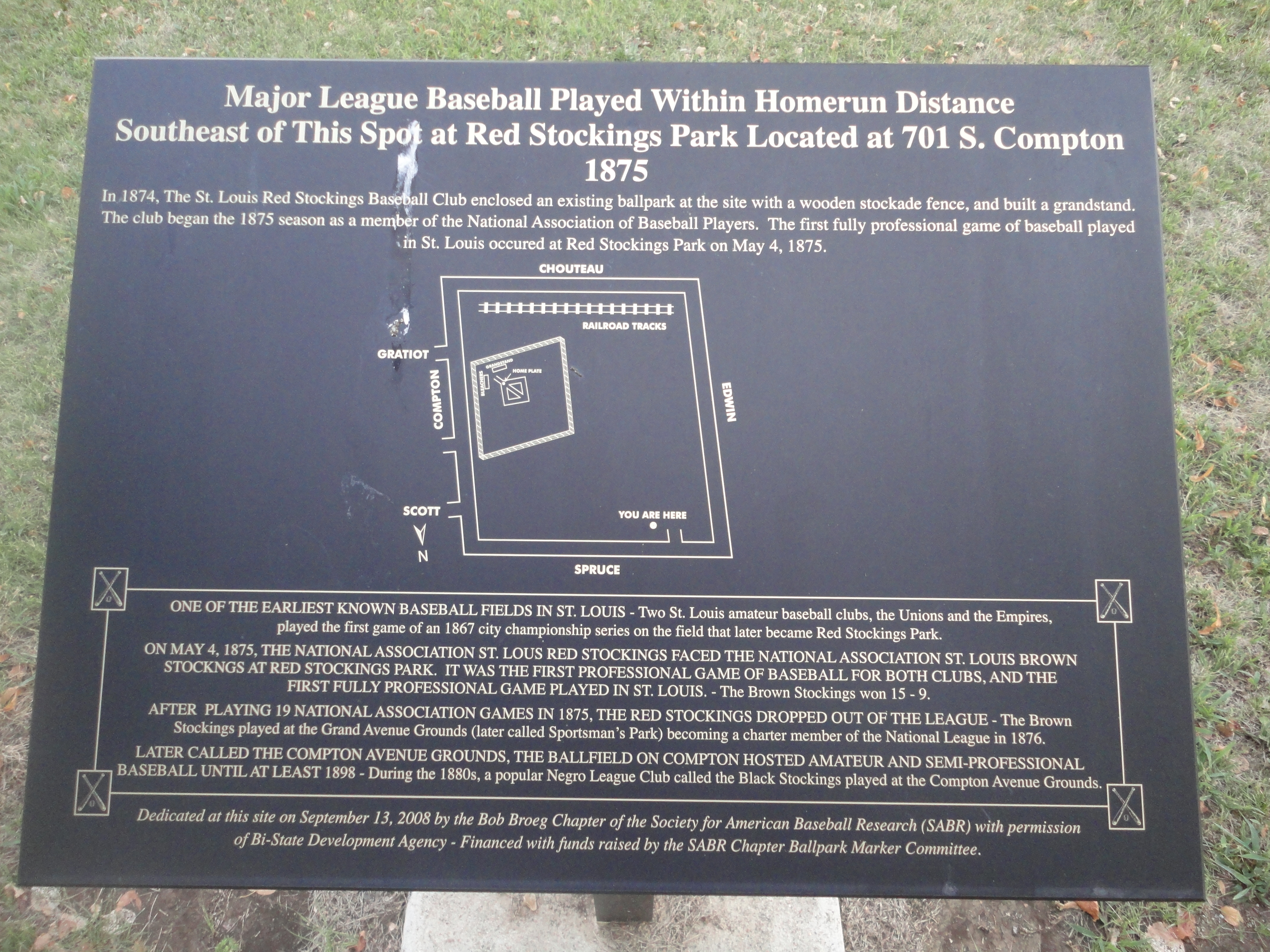
Marker recognizing and commemorating Red Stocking Baseball Park, July 2010

Red Stocking Base-Ball Park or Compton Avenue Park was a baseball grounds in St. Louis, Missouri. It was home to the St. Louis Red Stockings of the National Association (NA) during the 1875 season, so it is considered a major league ballpark by those who count the NA as a major league.

The site is first known to have been used for baseball in about 1867, when it was the home of something called the Veto Club, and was called the Veto Grounds. The grounds were evidently already well-known, as local newspapers in 1867 were calling it the "old" Veto Grounds. In 1874, the Red Stockings—then a local amateur club—built a grandstand behind home plate and a wooden stockade fence around the field. "The diamond lay near the southeast corner of the lot, home plate facing northwest," wrote Joan M. Thomas for the Society for American Baseball Research.

The name "Red Stocking Park" was used interchangeably by local media with "Compton Avenue Baseball Park" or just "Compton Park", as it was bordered by South Compton Avenue (east, first base). Its other boundaries were railroad tracks (south, third base); Edwin Street and Theresa Avenue (west, left field); Spruce Street (north, right field); and with Scott Avenue and Gratiot Street T-ing into Compton from the east.

In 1892, a new fence and additional seats were installed.

The park was used as a baseball venue off-and-on until it was razed in the late 1890s. It also hosted other local sports, including trap shooting and bicycle racing.

The site is currently occupied by Metro Transit's Central Facility.

== Historical marker ==
On September 13, 2008, a historical marker noting the site's history was unveiled by the Bob Broeg Chapter of the Society for American Baseball Research. The marker was financed with funds by the SABR Chapter Ballpark Marker Committee. Local papers reported that the plaque would be installed, with the permission of the Bi-State Development Agency, at the entrance of the Metro garage that now occupies the site. The marker is on the southeast corner of Spruce Street and the entry driveway which is about 200 feet east of where Edwin Street tees into Spruce. Chouteau Avenue, shown on the historical marker, was south of the tracks and not directly bordering the ballpark.
