= A. J. Pollock =

American baseball player (born 1987)

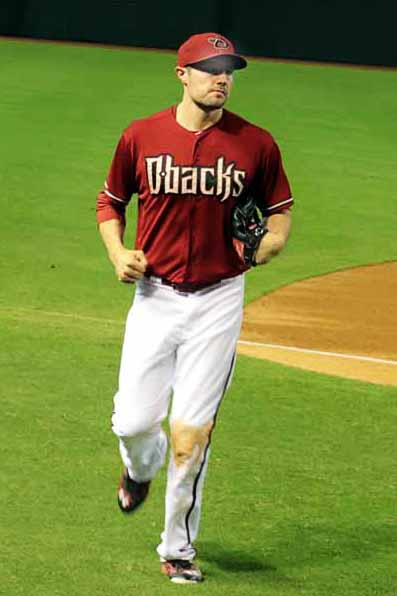
- Pollock with the Arizona Diamondbacks in 2015
- Outfielder
- Born: December 5, 1987 (age 38); Marlborough, Connecticut, U.S.
- Batted: Right Threw: Right

MLB debut
- April 18, 2012, for the Arizona Diamondbacks

Last MLB appearance
- August 8, 2023, for the San Francisco Giants

MLB statistics
- Batting average: .273
- Home runs: 145
- Runs batted in: 485
- Stats at Baseball Reference

Teams
- Arizona Diamondbacks (2012–2018); Los Angeles Dodgers (2019–2021); Chicago White Sox (2022); Seattle Mariners (2023); San Francisco Giants (2023)

Career highlights and awards
- All-Star (2015); World Series champion (2020); Gold Glove Award (2015)
Medals
Men's baseball
Representing United States
Pan American Games
Silver medal – second place	2011 Guadalajara	National team

Allen Lorenz "A. J." Pollock (born December 5, 1987) is an American former professional baseball outfielder. He played in Major League Baseball (MLB) for the Arizona Diamondbacks, Los Angeles Dodgers, Chicago White Sox, Seattle Mariners, and San Francisco Giants.

Pollock played college baseball for the Notre Dame Fighting Irish. The Diamondbacks selected Pollock in the first round of the 2009 Major League Baseball draft. He made his MLB debut with the Diamondbacks in 2012. Pollock was an MLB All-Star and won a Gold Glove Award in 2015.

== Early life ==
A. J. Pollock was born in Marlborough, Connecticut, to parents Al and Karen Pollock. His family lived an hour and forty minutes away from Foxboro, Massachusetts, and Pollock and his father would routinely make the trip to watch New England Patriots' home games.

Pollock attended RHAM High School in his hometown of Hebron, where he played basketball, soccer, and baseball. In his senior year, Pollock was a member of the National Honor Society. That year, he was named Gatorade Player of the Year in Connecticut, receiving the most votes for a Connecticut player since 1974, and was also named the state's Player of the Year by the coaches' association. Pollock finished his high school baseball career with a .411 batting average, 55 runs batted in (RBIs), 26 walks, 27 stolen bases, and eight strikeouts over 248 at-bats.

== College career ==
Pollock attended the University of Notre Dame, where he played college baseball for the Notre Dame Fighting Irish as an outfielder and third baseman. Pollock was named a Freshman All-American, leading the team with a .372 batting average. In 2007 playing for the NECBL Vermont Mountaineers, he won the 10th Player Award. Pollock was rated by Baseball America before his sophomore season as the league's second-best 2009 MLB prospect and best pure hitter. During his sophomore season, Pollock hit .352 and led the team in hitting and stolen bases and was a First-Team All-Big East Conference as a center fielder. After the 2008 season, he played collegiate summer baseball for the Falmouth Commodores of the Cape Cod Baseball League, where he hit .377 and was named MVP of the league. In his junior season at Notre Dame, Pollock hit .365, had an on-base percentage of .443, and a slugging percentage of .610. Pollock also made no errors in 159 chances and stole 21 bases in 25 tries. Pollock became second player ever to lead the team in batting average for three consecutive years.

== Professional career ==
=== Arizona Diamondbacks ===
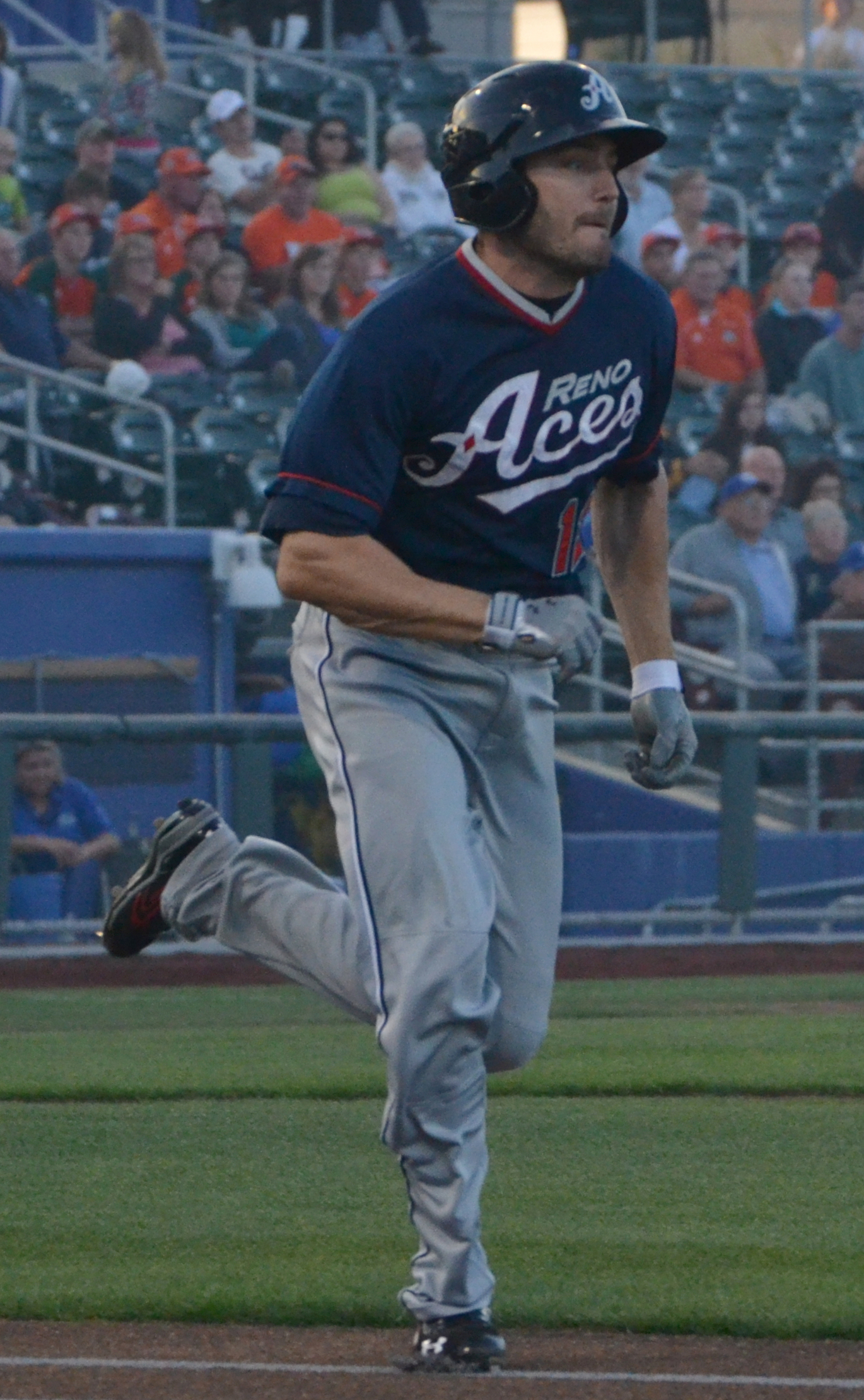
Pollock with the Reno Aces in 2012

The Arizona Diamondbacks selected Pollock in the first round of the 2009 MLB draft. He was chosen as a compensation pick from the Los Angeles Dodgers for the signing of Orlando Hudson.

The Diamondbacks invited Pollock to spring training in 2010. He broke his right elbow while attempting to make a diving catch. Pollock missed the entire season due to the injury.

In 2011 he played for the Mobile BayBears. He batted .307/.358/.444 in 550 at-bats with 103 runs (leading the Southern League), 41 doubles (third), 36 steals (third), and nine sacrifice flies (third).

Pollock was called up to the majors for the first time on April 18, 2012, and made his debut that day. Batting as a pinch hitter for Justin Upton, Pollock collected his first career MLB hit, a single, on April 23 against the Phillies. He played in 31 games that season for the Diamondbacks, batting .247/.315/.395 in 81 at bats with two home runs and eight RBIs.

In 2013, Pollock batted .269/.322/.409 with eight home runs, 38 RBIs, and 12 stolen bases in 15 attempts in the course of 443 at bats over 137 games.

Pollock missed the second half of the 2014 season with an injury. Up to that point in the season, he was batting .302.353/.498 with 14 stolen bases in 17 attempts in 265 at-bats.

In 2015, he was named a National League All-Star. He ended the season batting .315 (third in the NL)/.367/.498 in 609 at bats with 22 runs (second in the NL), 39 doubles (third), six triples (sixth), 20 home runs, 76 RBIs, 39 stolen bases (third), an 84.8% stolen base success rate (sixth), and eight sacrifice flies (second), playing 151 games in center field. He led the National League in power-speed number (26.4). He came in 14th in voting for NL MVP. He also won a Gold Glove.

Pollock signed to a two-year contract extension worth $10.25 million on February 8, 2016. Pollock broke his right elbow again at the end of spring training, this time on a slide at home plate, and missed most of the 2016 season. In the 12 games he would appear in during the 2016 season, Pollock would record 10 hits on 41 at-bats, a .244 batting average, playing center field.

On May 15, 2017, Pollock was placed on the 10-day disabled list due to a right groin strain. Over the course of 112 games in 2017, Pollock batted .266/.330/.471 in 413 at-bats, with six triples (ninth in the NL), 14 home runs, and 49 RBIs, playing center field.

In 2018, Pollock hit .257/.316/.484 in 413 at-bats with 21 home runs, 65 RBIs and seven sacrifice flies (ninth in the NL) over 113 games, playing center field. He was also 13-for-15 in stolen base attempts.

=== Los Angeles Dodgers ===
On January 26, 2019, the Los Angeles Dodgers announced that they had signed Pollock to a four-year contract, with a player option for another year.

On April 30, 2019, the Dodgers placed Pollock on the injured list with a right elbow inflammation. He did not rejoin the team until July 12. In September, the Dodgers moved Pollock to left field for the rest of the season. For the season he appeared in 86 games, batting .266/.327/.468, with 15 homers and 47 RBIs.

The 2020 season was shortened because of the COVID-19 pandemic, but Pollock played in 55 of the Dodgers' 60 games. On September 16, Pollock hit his 100th career home run, off of Adrián Morejón of the San Diego Padres. He batted .276/.314 (a career low)/.566 (a career high) with 16 home runs (third in the NL), 12.3 at bats per home run (fifth), and 34 RBIs. In the postseason, Pollock had one hit (a double) in five at-bats in the Wild Card Series, three hits in 10 at-bats in the 2020 NLDS, four hits in 20 at bats in the 2020 NLCS and one hit (a double) in six at-bats in the 2020 World Series, which the Dodgers won in six games.

On May 2, 2021, against the Milwaukee Brewers, Pollock hit two home runs (including a grand slam) and drove in a career high eight RBI. Pollock received player of the week for July 5–11, 2021, during the week he had a four-game hitting streak while batting .391/.462/1.043 with three doubles, four home runs and four RBIs. For the 2021 season Pollock batted .297/.356/.537 in 384 at bats with 27 doubles, 21 home runs, 69 RBIs, and nine steals (while being caught once), while playing 103 games in left field and eight games in center field. In the postseason, he was hitless in three at-bats in the Wild Card Game, had three hits in 11 at bats (.273) over four games in the 2021 NLDS and eight hits in 21 at-bats (.381) with two home runs in the 2021 NLCS.

=== Chicago White Sox ===
On April 1, 2022, Pollock was traded to the Chicago White Sox in exchange for Craig Kimbrel. Overall in 2022, Pollock appeared in 138 games hitting to a .245 average with 14 home runs and 56 RBIs. On November 8, Pollock declined his option for the 2023 season and became a free agent.

=== Seattle Mariners ===
On January 12, 2023, Pollock signed a one-year, $7 million contract with the Seattle Mariners.

Prior to the trade, Pollock appeared in 49 games for Seattle, batting .173/.225/.323 (all career lows), with five homers and 15 RBIs.

=== San Francisco Giants ===
On July 31, 2023, Pollock and Mark Mathias were traded to the San Francisco Giants in exchange for cash considerations or a player to be named later. Pollock went hitless in five games for the Giants before he was released by the team on September 5.

== International career ==
Pollock played for the United States national baseball team at the 2011 Pan American Games.

== Coaching career ==
On March 8, 2024, it was announced that Pollock had joined the Seattle Mariners during spring training as a volunteer assistant coach.

== Personal life ==
Pollock became engaged to his girlfriend, Kate, in March 2014. They met at Notre Dame, where Kate played for the lacrosse team. They were married after the 2014 season. In May 2020, Pollock and his wife welcomed a daughter at only 24 weeks of gestation, and she spent 128 days in the hospital after her birth. The family resides in Phoenix, Arizona.

== See also ==
- Arizona Diamondbacks award winners and league leaders
- Notre Dame Fighting Irish baseball statistical leaders
