= Niko Kavadas =

American baseball player (born 1998)

Los Angeles Angels
- First baseman
- Born: October 27, 1998 (age 28); South Bend, Indiana, U.S.
- Bats: Left Throws: Right

MLB debut
- August 16, 2024, for the Los Angeles Angels

MLB statistics (through 2025 season)
- Batting average: .168
- Home runs: 4
- Runs batted in: 8
- Stats at Baseball Reference

Teams
- Los Angeles Angels (2024–2025)

Nikolos Siade Kavadas (born October 27, 1998) is an American professional baseball first baseman and designated hitter in the Los Angeles Angels organization.

== Early life ==
Kavadas grew up in Granger, Indiana, and attended Penn High School. As a junior, he was named first team All-Northern Indiana Conference and Class 4-A All-State after posting a .440 batting average with three home runs, 14 doubles, and 44 RBIs.

== College career ==
Kavadas played college baseball at Notre Dame for four seasons. After his freshman season, he played in the Northwoods League for the Kalamazoo Growlers, compiling a .308 average. After his sophomore season in 2019, he played for the Harwich Mariners of the Cape Cod Baseball League, where he was named a league all-star and tied for the league lead with nine home runs in 40 games. As a junior, Kavadas hit .255 with seven home runs and 17 RBIs in 13 games before the season was cut short due to the coronavirus pandemic. He batted .302 and hit a school record 22 home runs with 64 RBIs in his senior season and was named first team All-Atlantic Coast Conference and a first team All-American by Baseball America. Kavadas finished his collegiate career with 46 home runs and 146 RBIs while batting for a .286 average over 161 games played.

== Professional career ==
=== Boston Red Sox ===
Kavadas was selected in the 11th round, with the 316th overall pick, of the 2021 Major League Baseball draft by the Red Sox. He signed with the team on August 1, 2021, and received a $250,000 bonus. He was initially assigned to the rookie–level Florida Complex League Red Sox, then promoted to the Low-A Salem Red Sox in August. Overall with both teams in 2021, Kavadas batted .256 with two home runs and six RBI in 15 games. Kavadas played for three teams during 2022: Salem, the High-A Greenville Drive, and the Double-A Portland Sea Dogs. Overall for the season, he had a .280/.443/.547 slash line in 393 at bats, and was second in the minor leagues with 102 walks. He was named the minor-league Offensive Player of the Year by the Red Sox organization. After the season, he was selected to play in the Arizona Fall League.

Kavadas split the 2023 season between Double-A Portland and the Triple-A Worcester Red Sox, posting a combined .206 with 22 home runs and 69 RBI. He returned to Worcester to begin the 2024 season, hitting .281 with 17 home runs and 63 RBI across 83 games.

=== Los Angeles Angels ===
On July 30, 2024, Kavadas, Matthew Lugo, Yeferson Vargas, and Ryan Zeferjahn were traded to the Los Angeles Angels in exchange for Luis García. In 11 games for the Triple–A Salt Lake Bees, he slashed .159/.229/.341 with two home runs and four RBI. On August 16, 2024, Kavadas was selected to the 40-man roster and made his major league debut for the Angels. On August 24, Kavadas recorded his first hit as a major leaguer. He smacked a three-run home run to the opposite field, in the 9th inning against the Toronto Blue Jays. In 30 appearances during his rookie campaign, Kavadas slashed .183/.283/.333 with four home runs, eight RBI, and one stolen base.

Kavadas was optioned to Triple-A Salt Lake to begin the 2025 season. On August 27, 2025, Kavadas pitched 1 2/3 scoreless innings of relief during a blowout loss to the Texas Rangers; in the appearance, he recorded his first career strikeout against Rangers outfielder Joc Pederson. In 10 appearances for Los Angeles, he went 2-for-20 (.100) with three walks. On September 12, Kavadas was designated for assignment by the Angels. He cleared waivers and was sent outright to Triple-A Salt Lake on September 14.

In 2026, he played in 81 games between Triple-A and rookie ball batting .318/.455/.598 with 16 home runs and 65 RBIs.
