= Brant Ust =

Belgian baseball player (born 1978)

Medal record

Men's baseball

Representing United Kingdom

European Baseball Championship
Silver medal – second place	2007 Barcelona	

Brant Steven Ust (born July 17, 1978) is a Belgian former professional baseball player who played internationally for both the United States national baseball team and the Great Britain national baseball team.

== Career ==
=== College ===
Ust was born in Brussels, Belgium. He attended Eastlake High School in Sammamish, Washington and then the University of Notre Dame, with whom he won the Big East Conference Player of the Year in 1998. The previous year, he was the conference's Rookie of the Year. In 1997, he played collegiate summer baseball with the Harwich Mariners of the Cape Cod Baseball League.

=== Professional ===
Ust played in the minor leagues from 1999 to 2007, after being taken by the Detroit Tigers in the sixth round of the 1999 Major League Baseball draft. He reached as high as Triple-A in three seasons, but never played in the major leagues. Overall, he batted .242 with 69 home runs in 852 games. He also played for Grosseto in Serie A1 in Italy in 2008.

=== International ===
In 1998 Ust represented the United States national baseball team in the 1998 Baseball World Cup. In 2007 he represented the Great Britain national baseball team in the 2007 European Championships, with Great Britain earning the silver medal.
