= Dan Peltier =

American baseball player (born 1968)

- Right fielder
- Born: June 30, 1968 (age 57); Clifton Park, New York, U.S.
- Batted: Left Threw: Left

MLB debut
- June 26, 1992, for the Texas Rangers

Last MLB appearance
- July 17, 1996, for the San Francisco Giants

MLB statistics
- Batting average: .255
- Home runs: 1
- Runs batted in: 28
- Stats at Baseball Reference

Teams
- Texas Rangers (1992–1993); San Francisco Giants (1996)

Daniel Edward Peltier (born June 30, 1968) is an American former professional baseball player. A left-handed outfielder who also played some first base, he played in Major League Baseball in 1992 and 1993 for the Texas Rangers and 1996 for the San Francisco Giants. He was listed as being 6 ft 1 in (1.85 m) tall and weighing 200 pounds.

Prior to playing professionally, Peltier attended the University of Notre Dame. In 1988, he played collegiate summer baseball with the Chatham A's of the Cape Cod Baseball League. He was drafted by the Rangers in the third round of the 1989 amateur draft, and he began his professional career that year with the rookie league Butte Copper Kings. With them, he hit .402 with seven home runs, 28 RBI, 10 stolen bases and 25 walks in 33 games. He jumped to Double-A in 1990, playing in 117 games for the Tulsa Drillers. His average slipped to .279, however he hit 11 home runs, stole ten 10 bases again and drove in 57 runs.

His average slipped again in 1991, playing for the Triple-A Oklahoma City 89ers - he hit only .229 with three home runs and 32 RBI in 94 games. In 1992, he spent most of the season with the 89ers, hitting .296 with seven home runs and 53 RBI. On June 26, 1992, he made his big league debut, against the Detroit Tigers. He went 0-for-4 in his first game, and he began his career 0-for-13 before collecting his first hit - a single off of Toronto Blue Jays pitcher Juan Guzmán. Overall, he appeared in 12 big league games in 1992, hitting .167 in 24 at-bats.

In 65 games with the Rangers in 1993, Peltier hit .269 with one home run and 17 RBI. That home run would be the only one he'd hit in the major leagues - it was a three-run home run off of Bob Wickman. He spent 48 games with the 89ers that year as well, hitting .321 with five home runs and 33 RBI.

1994 was spent entirely with the 89ers. That season, he hit .268 with nine home runs and 60 RBI in 125 games. On March 29, 1995, right before the season was set to begin, Peltier was granted free-agency. No major league team signed him, so he played for the St. Paul Saints of the independent Northern League, hitting .366 with nine home runs in 83 games. He signed as a free agent with the San Francisco Giants on January 9, 1996, and spent most of that season with the Triple-A hitting .285 with no home runs in 70 games. He spent 31 games in the majors that year, hitting .254 with nine RBI in 59 at-bats. On July 17, 1996, he played his final game, and on October 15, 1996, he was granted free agency.

He played one more season of United States professional baseball, with the Saints of the Northern League in 1997. He hit .288 in 21 games. Overall, he hit .255 with one home run and 28 RBI in 108 big league games. In the minors, he hit .294 in nine seasons.
