= St. Louis Red Stockings =

The St. Louis Red Stockings were a professional baseball team in the National Association of Professional Base Ball Players (National Association or NA) for the 1875 season.

St. Louis (NA), in the standard short-form identification used for American baseball teams generally (which is "Team City (League)"), would be the standard identification for St. Louis baseball teams in the NA. (NA; full name National Association of Professional Base Ball Players).

There were two such teams, a very short-lived one in 1875 and another which (in the opinion of some sources) was a precursor to the modern St. Louis Cardinals. Because both clubs existed in 1875, and both were members of the National Association, the denotation "St. Louis (NA)" can be ambiguous and is generally avoided, and both contemporary and later records handled this ambiguity in various ways.

One club is now commonly called "Brown Stockings" but that name, though used at the time, was not then clearly or definitely established. The Red Stocking Baseball Club of St. Louis, however, carried that as their official name; they called their field Red Stocking Park and their uniforms bore an image of a red stocking on the chest.

St. Louis Red Stockings or Reds

- A local amateur team that decided to turn professional
- Spurred to join the NA out of outrage that the professional "Brown Stockings" had not one local player.
- Survived only a partial season in 1875 (18 games) as the club played its final game on July 4
- Played home games at Red Stocking Baseball Park

St. Louis Brown Stockings or Browns

- A true professional team with players recruited nationally
- Played the full 1875 season (68 games)
- Joined the newly formed National League in 1876
- Played home games at Grand Avenue Grounds, later called Sportsman's Park
- Dropped out of National League following 1877 season, due to a gambling scandal
- Played as an independent barnstorming team on a semi-professional basis from 1878 to 1881
- Purchased and reorganized as the professional St. Louis Brown Stockings by Chris von der Ahe in 1882.

== St. Louis baseball colors and nicknames ==
The Red Stockings club is not directly related with the St. Louis Cardinals of the National League other than the choice of team color.

As with many teams of that era, the teams' nicknames and colors were inspired by the Cincinnati Red Stockings, the first openly professional baseball team, which garnered much public interest due to an undefeated streak during a barnstorming tour in 1869–1870.

== Contemporary newspapers ==
On Independence Day 1875, the Chicago Tribune called the two teams "St. Louis" and "Red Stockings" in the standings; the former being "St. Louis" or "Browns" or "Brown Stockings" in prose and the latter being "Reds" in a game score (St Louis Reds 8, Washingtons 0). In a box score and game story, the Chicago White Stockings and St. Louis Brown Stockings are mainly Whites and Browns (noun) or White and Brown (adjective). The St. Louis Globe in March 1875 referred to the Brown Stockings simply as the "St. Louis Professionals."

== Baseball databases ==
Because the St. Louis Brown Stockings continued as a charter member of the National League and completed two seasons there (1876-1877), theirs is the more important place in baseball history. Probably for that reason, the Brown Stockings usually get "STL", nearly standard as a three-letter abbreviation for "St. Louis" in baseball encyclopedias, where space is severely at a premium. For example, Pete Palmer uses "STL" for the Brown Stockings and "RS" for the Red Stockings in print (see Total Baseball or the new Baseball Encyclopedia); Baseball-Reference uses "STL" and "SLR" online.

== Sources ==
- The Baseball Encyclopedia, MacMillan, various editions beginning in 1969
- Green Cathedrals, by Philip J. Lowry
- Ballparks of North America, by Michael Benson
- St. Louis' Big League Ballparks, by Joan M. Thomas
