= Munro (surname) =

Munro (Scottish Gaelic: Rothach) is a Scottish surname. It means "man from the River Roe" in County Londonderry, Northern Ireland. The surname is common in Ross-shire and other areas of northern Scotland; it also spread to Canada via emigration. Variant spellings of the same name include Monro, Monroe, Munroe, Munrow and Manrow.

People with the name include:

== A–F ==
- Adam Munro (born 1982), Canadian hockey player
- Alan Munro (immunologist) (born 1987), British immunologist and entrepreneur
- Alan Munro (jockey) (born 1967), British horse-racing rider
- Alex Munro (comedian) (1911–1986), Scottish actor and comedy figure
- Alex Munro (footballer born 1912) (1912–1984), Scottish football player
- Alex Munro (footballer born 1944), Scottish-born English football player
- Alexander Munro (athlete) (1870–1934), British Olympic athlete
- Alexander Munro (sculptor) (1825–1871), Scottish sculptor
- Alexander Munro of Bearcrofts (fl. 17th century), Scottish military leader
- Alice Munro (1931–2024), Canadian author, recipient of the 2013 Nobel Prize in Literature
- Andrew Munro (bishop) (fl. 15th century), Scottish bishop in the Roman Catholic Church
- Andrew Munro (mathematician) (1869–1935), Mathematician and Fellow at Queens' College, Cambridge
- Anna Munro (1881–1962), Scottish social activist
- Aubree Munro (born 1993), American softball player
- Bill Munro (1934–2023), Scottish footballer
- Burt Munro (1899–1978), New Zealand motorcycle racer
- Camille Munro (born 1991), Miss World Canada winner
- Campbell Munro (1899–1943), South African cricketer
- Carmine "Maggie" Munro (1931–2010), Aboriginal Australian leader
- Caroline Munro (born 1950), British actor and model
- Charles Ernest Monro (1874–1945), Scottish architect
- Charles H. Munro (1837–1908), Canadian physician and politician
- Charlie Munro (1917–1985), New Zealand-born Australian musician
- Colin Munro (born 1987), South African cricket player
- Colin Munro (diplomat) (born 1946), British diplomat
- Dan Munro (born 1887), Scottish footballer
- Dana Carleton Munro (1866–1933), US historian
- David H. Munro (born 1955), US physicist
- Donald Munro of Foulis (died 1039), Irish mercenary settler in Scotland and founder of the Clan Munro
- Donald W. Munro (1916–1998), Canadian politician
- Donnie Munro (born 1953), Scottish musician
- Douglas Munro (actor) (1866–1928), British actor
- Douglas Albert Munro (1919–1942), United States World War II hero in the United States Coast Guard
- Dugald Munro (1930–1973), Australian politician
- Dunc Munro (1901–1958), Canadian hockey player
- Edith Munro (1895–1983), United States Coast Guard officer
- Elgin Albert Munro (1874–1931), Canadian politician
- Eric Frank Russell (1905–1978), English author who used the pen name Duncan H. Munro
- Fayette S. Munro (1874–1921), American politician and lawyer
- Frank Munro (1947–2011), Scottish football player

== G–L ==
- George Munro (philanthropist) (1825–1896), Canadian educator and philanthropist
- George Munro, 1st of Auchinbowie (fl. late 17th century), Scottish soldier
- George Munro, 1st of Culcairn (1685–1746), Scottish soldier
- George Munro, 1st of Newmore (1602–1693), Scottish soldier and politician
- George Munro, 5th Baron of Foulis (fl. 13th century), Scottish leader
- Lieutenant-Colonel George Munro (1700–1757), Scottish soldier (also spelled Monro)
- Gerald Munro (1897–1968), Canadian hockey player
- Grace Emily Munro (1879-1964), Australian volunteer and charity worker
- Grant Munro (filmmaker) (1923–2017), Canadian actor and film producer
- Grant Munro (footballer) (born 1980), Scottish football player
- Hamish Munro (1915-1994), Scottish biochemist and nutritionist
- Sir Harry Munro, 7th Baronet (1720–1781), Scottish military leader and politician
- Hector Hugh Munro (1870–1916), British author using the pen name Saki
- Hector Munro, 8th of Novar (1726–1805), Scottish military leader
- Henry M. Munro (1840–1915), Canadian politician
- Henry Munro (Canada West politician) (1802–1874), Canadian politician
- Henry Munro (United Irishman) (1758–1798), Irish independence figure
- Hope Munro (born 1981), Australian field hockey player
- Hugh Andrew Johnstone Munro of Novar (1797–1864), Scottish art collector
- Hugh Andrew Johnstone Munro (1819–1885), Scottish classical scholar
- Hugh Munro or Monroe (Rising Wolf) (1799-1892) Canadian fur trapper who joined the Blackfeet Nation.
- Hugh Munro (Canadian politician) (1854–1939), Canadian politician
- Hugh Munro, 9th Baron of Foulis (f. 15th century), Scottish leader
- Iain Munro (born 1951) Scottish football player
- Ian Munro (disambiguation), several people
  - Ian Munro (pianist) (born 1963), Australian musician
- Ingrid Munro (fl. 20th century), Swedish-born social activist in Kenya
- James Munro (disambiguation), several people
  - James Mitchell (writer) (1926–2002), British author who used the pen name James Munro
  - James Munro (Australian politician) (1832–1908), Premier of Victoria
  - James Munro (VC) (1826–1871), Scottish soldier and war hero
  - Jim Munro (1870–1945), New Zealand politician
  - Jim Munro (born 1962), British journalist
  - Jimmy Munro (1870–1899), Scottish football player
- Janet Munro (1934–1972), British actor
- Jock Munro (1893–1917), Scottish footballer
- John Munro, 9th of Teaninich (1778–1858), Scottish soldier of the British H.E.I.C
- John Munro (loyalist) (~1728-1800) Scottish soldier opposing the American Revolution who later settled in Canada.
- John Neil Munro (born 1959), Scottish author and journalist
- Jonathan Munro, British journalist
- Julia Munro (fl. 1990s–2000s), Canadian politician
- Kathleen Munroe, Canadian actress
- Lachie Munro (born 1986), New Zealand rugby player
- Les Munro (1919–2015), English WWII pilot and war hero
- Leslie Munro (1901–1974), New Zealand lawyer and politician
- Libby Munro (born 1981), Australian actress
- Lily Oddie Munro (1937–2021), Canadian politician formerly called Lily Oddie Munro
- Lyall Munro Jnr (born 1951), Aboriginal Australian activist and elder
- Lyall Munro Snr (1931–2020), Aboriginal Australian activist and elder
- Lochlyn Munro (born 1966), Canadian actor

== M–Z ==
- Madeline Munro (1885–1974), British geologist, science educator and film reviewer
- "Maggie" (Carmine) Munro (1931–2010), Aboriginal Australian leader
- Malcolm Munro (born 1953), English footballer
- Margaret Munro (1914–2005), New Zealand architect
- Marita Munro (born 1954), Australian academic and church historian
- Mike Munro (born 1952), Australian television personality
- Morndi Munro, the last fluent speaker of the Unggumi language of Western Australia
- Neil Gordon Munro (1863–1942), Scottish-born Japanese physician
- Neil Munro (actor) (1947–2009), Canadian actor, director and playwright
- Neil Munro (footballer) (1868–1948), Scottish football player
- Neil Munro (writer) (1863–1930), Scottish author who sometimes used pen name Hugh Foulis
- Norman Munro (1842–1894), US newspaper publisher
- Pamela Munro (born 1947), US linguist
- Patrick Munro (1883–1942), British politician
- Pete Munro (born 1975), US baseball player
- Peter Jay Munro (1767–1833), American politician and lawyer
- Rob Munro (politician) (fl. 1980s–1990s), New Zealand politician
- Robert Monro sometimes also spelt Munro. 17th century Scottish general
- Robert Munro (disambiguation), several people
  - Robert Munro (rugby footballer)
  - Robert Munro, 6th Baron of Foulis (fl. 14th century), Scottish leader
  - Robert Munro, 14th Baron of Foulis (died 1547), Scottish leader
  - Robert Mor Munro, 15th Baron of Foulis (fl. 16th century), Scottish leader
  - Robert Munro, 18th Baron of Foulis (died 1633), Scottish leader
  - Robert Munro, 1st Baron Alness (1868–1955), Scottish politician and judge
  - Sir Robert Munro, 3rd Baronet (fl. 17th century), Scottish leader
  - Sir Robert Munro, 5th Baronet (died 1729), Scottish leader
  - Sir Robert Munro, 6th Baronet (1684–1746), Scottish military leader
- Rona Munro (born 1959), Scottish author
- S. Sterling Munro, Jr. (1932–1992), US lawyer
- Samantha Munro (born 1990), Canadian actor
- Sandy Munro (born 1949), US automotive engineer
- Stuart Munro (born 1962), Scottish football player
- Thalia Munro (born 1982), US water polo player
- Thomas Munro (art historian) (1897–1974), US art historian
- Thomas Munro (solicitor) (1866–1923), Scottish public figure
- Tony Munro (1963/64 – 2016), Australian sports journalist
- Sir Thomas Munro, 1st Baronet (1761–1827), Scottish soldier
- Wilfred Harold Munro (1849–1934), US historian
- William Munro (disambiguation), several people

== See also ==
- Munro (disambiguation)
- Monro (disambiguation)
- Monroe (surname)
- Munroe (disambiguation)
