= Monroe =

Monroe or Monroes may refer to:

== People and fictional characters ==
- Monroe (surname)
- Monroe (given name)
- James Monroe, 5th President of the United States
- Marilyn Monroe, actress and model
- Monroe (singer), singer who represented France in the 2026 Eurovision Song Contest

== Places ==
=== United States ===
- Monroe, Arkansas, an unincorporated community and census-designated place
- Fort Monroe (Yosemite), California, a historic site
- Monroe, Connecticut, a town
- Lake Monroe (Florida)
- Monroe, Georgia, a city
- Monroe, Adams County, Indiana, a town
- Monroe, Tippecanoe County, Indiana, an unincorporated community
- Lake Monroe (Indiana), a reservoir
- Monroe, Iowa, a city
- Monroe, Kentucky, an unincorporated community
- Monroe, Louisiana, the most populous city with the name Monroe
- Monroe, Maine, a town
- Monroe, Massachusetts, a town
- Monroe, Michigan, a city
- Lake Monroe (Mississippi), Monroe County, Mississippi
- Monroe Island, in the Yellowstone River in Montana
- Monroe, Nebraska, a village
- Monroe, New Hampshire a town
- Mount Monroe, a peak in the White Mountains of New Hampshire
- Monroe, Morris County, New Jersey, an unincorporated community
- Monroe, Sussex County, New Jersey, an unincorporated community
- Monroe, New York, a town
  - Monroe (village), New York, in the town of Monroe
- Monroe, North Carolina, a city
- Monroe, Ohio, a city
- Monroe, Jackson County, Ohio, an unincorporated community
- Monroe, Oklahoma, an unincorporated community and census-designated place
- Monroe, Oregon, a city
- Monroe, Pennsylvania, a borough
- Monroe, South Dakota, a town
- Monroe, Tennessee, an unincorporated community
- Monroe, Utah, a city
- Monroe, Virginia, an unincorporated community
- Fort Monroe, Hampton, Virginia, a former military installation
- Monroe Park, Richmond, Virginia
- Monroe Bay, Virginia
- Monroe, Washington, a city
- Monroe, Adams County, Wisconsin, a town
- Monroe (town), Green County, Wisconsin, a town
- Monroe, Wisconsin, a city partially within the town of Monroe
- Monroe Township (disambiguation)
- Monroe County (disambiguation)

=== Elsewhere ===
- Monroe Island, South Orkney Islands, Antarctica
- Monroe Point, South Shetland Islands, Antarctica
- Monroe, Newfoundland and Labrador, Canada, a settlement
- Monroe, County Westmeath, Ireland, a townland
- 3768 Monroe, an asteroid

== Arts and entertainment ==
=== Television ===
- Monroe (TV series), a British medical drama series
- The Monroes (1966 TV series), an American Western series
- The Monroes (1995 TV series), an American prime-time soap opera

=== Music ===
- The Monroes (American band), a 1980s New Wave pop band
- The Monroes (Norwegian band), a 1980s pop/ska duo

=== Other arts and entertainment ===
For fictional characters, see Monroe (given name) and Monroe (surname).

- Monroe (comic strip), a comic strip published in Mad Magazine
- Monroe Republic, an area of the US in the television series Revolution

== Schools ==
- Monroe College, a former name of Tift College, a private liberal arts women's college located in Forsyth, Georgia
- Monroe College, an American for-profit college based in New York
- Monroe School (Phoenix, Arizona), a former school on the National Register of Historic Places
- Monroe School (Sandusky, Ohio), on the National Register of Historic Places in Sandusky, Ohio
- Monroe High School (disambiguation)
- Monroe Elementary School (disambiguation)

== Transportation ==
- Monroe (automobile), a vintage American automobile of the Brass Era
- SS Monroe (1902), a steamship
- Monroe Airport (disambiguation)
- Monroe Expressway, North Carolina
- Monroe Railroad (disambiguation)
- Monroe station (disambiguation)

== Other uses ==
- Monroe (tree), a giant sequoia in the Giant Forest, California
- Monroe Correctional Complex, Monroe, Washington, United States
- Monroe (avocado), a commercial avocado cultivar
- Monroe Calculating Machine Company, an American calculator company
- Monroe, a division of the Tenneco corporation
- Monroe piercing, body piercing of the upper lip area
- Palácio Monroe, a former building in Rio de Janeiro

== See also ==
- Monroe Doctrine, a United States policy of opposing European colonialism in the Americas
- Monroe Center (disambiguation)
- Monroe City (disambiguation)
- Monroe County (disambiguation)
- Monroeville (disambiguation)
- Monro (disambiguation)
- Munro (disambiguation)
- Munroe (disambiguation)
