= Munroe =

Munroe is a derivation of the Scottish surname Munro, and may refer to:

== Academics ==
- Charles Edward Munroe (1849–1938), an American chemist
- Eugene G. Munroe (1919–2008), a Canadian entomologist
- Heather Munroe-Blum, Principal and Vice-Chancellor of McGill University in Montreal, Quebec
- James Phinney Munroe, American author, professor and genealogist of the Clan Munro

== Arts and entertainment ==
- Carmen Munroe (born 1932), a British actress
- Gage Munroe (born 1999), a Canadian actor
- Jim Munroe (born 1973), a Canadian science fiction author
- Kathleen Munroe (born 1982), Canadian actress
- Kevin Munroe (born 1972), the director of 2007 CG film TMNT
- Lorne Munroe (1924–2020), an American cellist in the New York Philharmonic Orchestra
- Randall Munroe (born 1984), the creator of the webcomic xkcd

== Government and politics ==
- Allen Munroe (1819–1884), American politician from New York
- Daniel Munroe Forney (1784–1847), American politician from North Carolina
- George H. Munroe (1844–1912), American politician from Illinois
- James Munroe (New York politician) (1815–1869), American politician from New York
- John H. Munroe (1820–1885), Canadian politician from Ontario
- Trevor Munroe (born 1944), Jamaican political scientist, labour activist, and politician

== Other ==
- Allie Munroe (born 1997), Canadian ice hockey player
- Myles Munroe (1954–2014), a Bahamian Christian evangelist
- Ralph Munroe (1851–1933), an American yacht designer and early pioneer of South Florida
- William Munroe (1778–1861), the first American pencil maker
- William R. Munroe (1886–1966), a Vice Admiral in the United States Navy

== Fictional characters ==
- Jill Munroe, fictional detective in TV show Charlie's Angels
- Kris Munroe, fictional detective in TV show Charlie's Angels
- Mikey Munroe, fictional character in TV show Bunsen Is a Beast!
- Ororo Munroe , Marvel Comics superhero known as Storm
- Sonny Munroe, a character in Sonny with a Chance protayed by Demi Lovato

== See also ==
- 4942 Munroe, a main-belt asteroid named after Randall Munroe
- Monro (disambiguation)
- Monroe (disambiguation)
- Munro (disambiguation)
