= Robert Munro =

Robert Munro may refer to:

- Robert Munro, 6th Baron of Foulis (died 1323)
- Robert de Munro, 8th Baron of Foulis (died 1369)
- Robert Munro, 14th Baron of Foulis (died 1547), Scottish soldier and clan chief
- Robert Mor Munro, 15th Baron of Foulis (died 1588)
- Robert Munro, 18th Baron of Foulis (died 1633), Scottish soldier, 21st chief of Clan Munro
- Sir Robert Munro, 3rd Baronet (died 1668), 24th chief of Clan Munro
- Sir Robert Munro, 5th Baronet (died 1729), 26th chief of Clan Munro
- Sir Robert Munro, 6th Baronet (1684–1746), Scottish soldier and politician, 27th chief of Clan Munro, son of the above
- Robert Munro (archaeologist) (1835–1920), Scottish archaeologist
- Robert Munro (folklorist) (1853–?), Scottish minister and author
- Robert Munro, 1st Baron Alness (1868–1955), Scottish Liberal politician and judge
- Robert Munro (rugby union) (1839–1913), Scottish rugby union international and Church of Scotland minister
- Sir Robert Munro (lawyer) (1907–1995), New Zealand-born lawyer in Fiji
- Rob Munro (politician) (born 1946), New Zealand politician
- Rob Munro (bishop) (born 1963), English bishop

== See also ==
- Robert Monro (1601–1680), Scottish general, also spelt Munro
- Robert Monro (cricketer) (1838–1908), English cricketer
- Robert Monroe (1915–1995), researcher into out-of-body experiences
