= Monroe (given name) =

- Pronunciation: /ˈmən.ˈroʊ/
- Gender: Unisex
- Language: English

Origin
- Language: Scottish Gaelic
- Origin: From a Scottish surname
- Meaning: "From the mouth of the Roe"
- Region of origin: Scotland

Other names
- Variant forms: Monro; Munroe; Munro

Monroe is a unisex given name, a transferred use of the surname.

== Men ==
- Monroe Althouse (1853–1924), American composer and bandmaster
- Monroe Baker (1821 or 1823–?), American politician, one of the first, possibly the first, African-American mayors in the United States
- Monroe Beardsley (1915–1985), American philosopher
- Monroe D. Donsker (1924–1991), American mathematician and a professor
- Monroe Evans (fl. 1966–1969), first Jewish mayor of Fayetteville, North Carolina, United States
- Monroe Hayward (1840–1899), American politician and senator
- Monroe Heath (1827–1894), American politician, mayor of Chicago, Illinois, United States
- Monroe Fein (1923–1982), US Navy lieutenant and captain of the Altalena in the 1948 Altalena Affair
- Monroe Freeling (born 2004), American football player
- Monroe Karmin (1929–1999), American Pulitzer Prize-winning journalist
- Monroe H. Kulp (1858–1911), American politician
- Monroe Alpheus Majors (1864–1960), American physician, writer and civil rights activist
- Monroe G. McKay (1928–2020), United States circuit judge
- Monroe Morton (1856–1919), African-American businessperson and postmaster
- Monroe Jackson Rathbone II (1900–1976), American businessman, chairman, president, and CEO of Standard Oil of New Jersey
- Monroe M. Redden (1901–1987), American politician
- Monroe Rosenfeld (c. 1861–1918), American songwriter and journalist
- Monroe M. Shipe (1847–1924), American real estate developer and streetcar network operator
- Monroe Trout (born 1962), formerly American, hedge fund manager
- Monroe Work (1866-1945), sociologist and publisher including of the Negro Yearbook

== Women ==
- Monroe Cannon (born 2011), daughter of Mariah Carey and Nick Cannon
- Monroe (born 2008), French-American singer

== Fictional characters ==
- Monroe Ficus, in the American sitcom Too Close for Comfort
- Monroe Stahr, protagonist of F. Scott Fitzgerald's unfinished novel The Last Tycoon
- Monroe, in the American television series Grimm
- Monroe, in the American animated television series The Life and Times of Juniper Lee (2005–2007)
- Monroe, main character of William Wray's comic strip Monroe, published in Mad magazine
