= Monroe metropolitan area =

The Monroe metropolitan area may refer to:

- The Monroe, Louisiana metropolitan area, United States
- The Monroe, Michigan metropolitan area, United States

== See also ==
- Monroe (disambiguation)
