= Citation needed =

Wikipedia tag added to unsourced statements

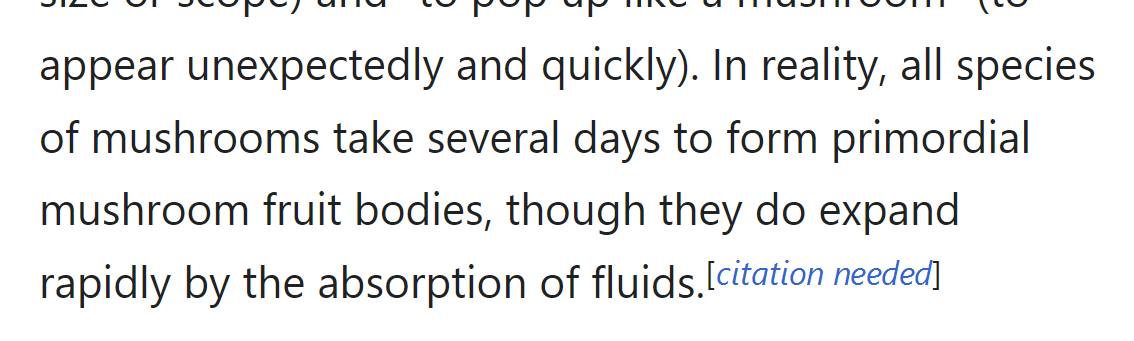
The citation needed template in a previous version of the English Wikipedia's article about the mushroom

The tag "citation needed" (stylized as "^{[citation needed]}") is added by Wikipedia editors to unsourced statements in articles requesting citations to be added. The phrase is reflective of the Wikipedia policies of verifiability and no original research, and has become a general Internet meme.

== Usage on Wikipedia ==
The tag was first used on Wikipedia in 2006, and its template created by user Ta bu shi da yu. According to Wikipedia's policy, editors should add citations for content, to ensure accuracy and neutrality, and to avoid original research. The citation needed tag is used to mark statements that lack supported citations. Wikipedia editors may use tools like Citation Hunt to address these uncited statements. Users who click the tag will be directed to pages about Wikipedia's verifiability policy and its application using the tag.

A parody of the tag, [cetacean needed], is used for missing images on Wikipedia's list of cetaceans page.

== Usage outside Wikipedia ==
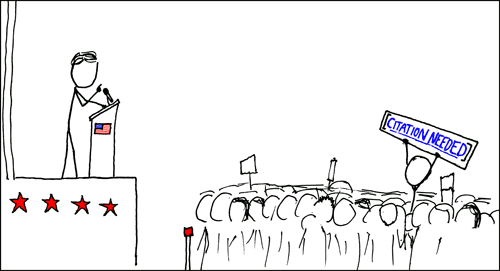
A 2007 xkcd comic by Randall Munroe featuring a protester with a "[citation needed]" placard

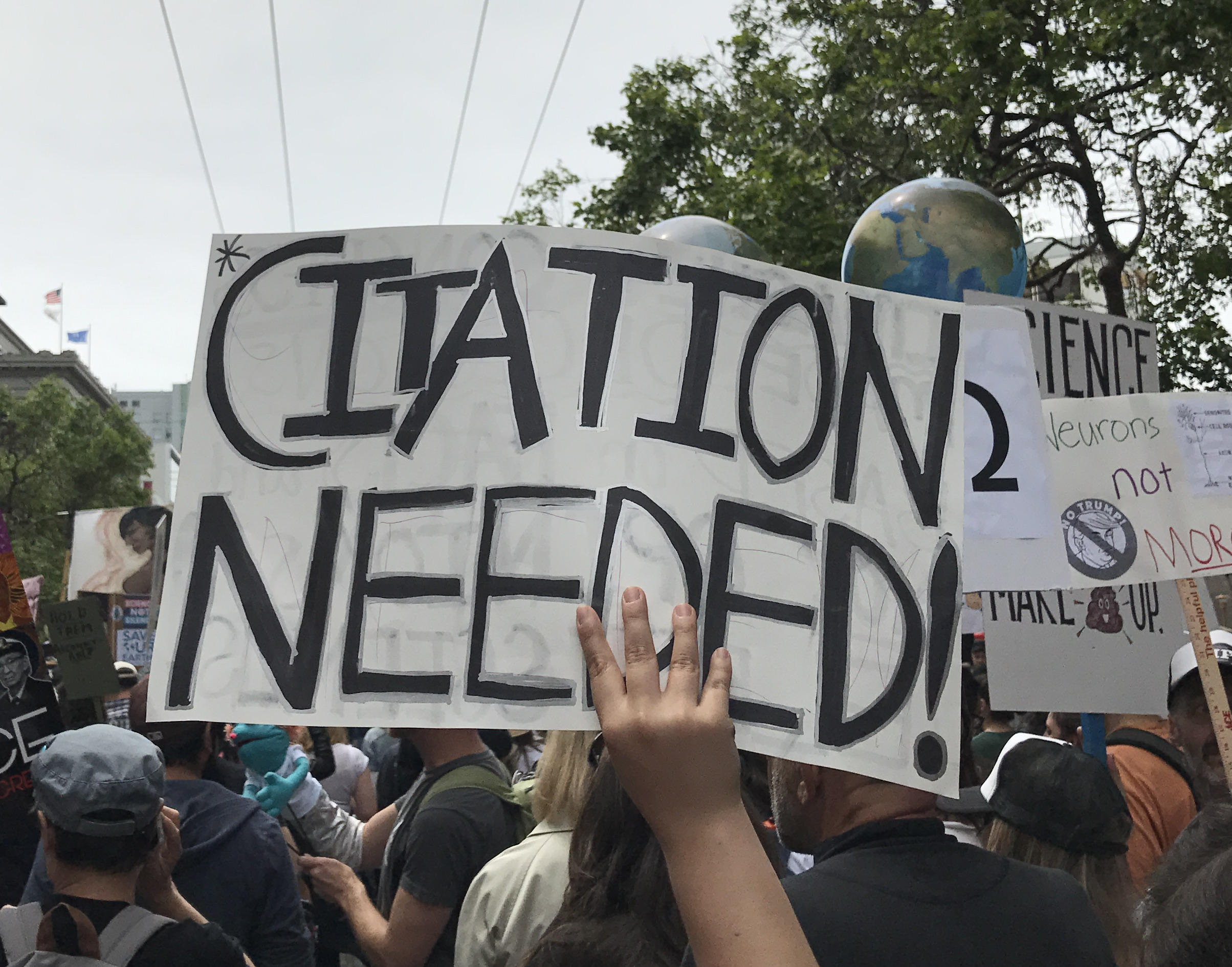
Poster at the 2017 March for Science

In 2008, culture jammer Matt Mechtley created stickers with "[citation needed]", encouraging people to stick them on advertisements.

In 2010, American television hosts Jon Stewart and Stephen Colbert led the Rally to Restore Sanity and/or Fear at the National Mall in Washington, D.C., where some participants held placards with "[citation needed]".

American cartoonist Randall Munroe has frequently used "[citation needed]" tags for humorous commentary in his writings, including in his 2014 book What If?.

The podcast "Citations Needed" is a Webby-nominated media criticism podcast, hosted by journalists Nima Shirazi and Adam Johnson to explore the intersection of media, PR, and power.

Wikipedian Molly White publishes a newsletter covering the cryptocurrency and technology industries called Citation Needed.
