= What If? 2 =

What If? 2 may refer to:

- What If? 2 (book), a 2022 non-fiction book by Randall Munroe
- What If? 2 (essays), a 2001 anthology of essays edited by Robert Cowley
