= R9k =

R9k can refer to:

- Robot9000, open source software
- /r9k/, a board on 4chan which implements the above software
