= James Munro =

James Munro may refer to:

- James Munro (sealer) (c. 1779–1845), Tasmanian settler
- James Munro (VC) (1826–1871), Scottish soldier, recipient of the Victoria Cross
- James Munro (Australian politician) (1832–1908), 15th Premier of Victoria
- Jimmy Munro (footballer, born 1870) (1870–1899), Scottish footballer (Bolton Wanderers, Burton Swifts and Swindon Town)
- Jimmy Munro (footballer, born 1905) (1905–1978), Scottish footballer (St Johnstone, Cardiff City)
- Jimmy Munro (footballer, born 1926) (1926–1997), Scottish footballer (Manchester City)
- James Munro (Scottish footballer), Scottish footballer (Queen's Park)
- Jim Munro (1870–1945), New Zealand politician of the Labour Party
- James S. Munro (1846–?), politician in Ontario, Canada
- James Munro, pseudonym of British thriller writer James Mitchell (born 1962)
- Jim Munro (journalist) (born 1962), British journalist
- Jimmie Munro (James Leslie Munro, 1906–1974), Australian jockey, later trainer
- James Munro (racing driver) (born 1997)

== See also ==
- James Monroe (disambiguation)
- James Munroe (disambiguation)
