= James Monroe (disambiguation) =

James Monroe (1758–1831) was the fifth president of the United States, from 1817 to 1825.

James Monroe may also refer to:

- James Monroe (New York politician) (1799–1870), American congressman from New York, nephew of the president
- James Monroe (Michigan politician) (1816–1899), Michigan state representative
- James Monroe (Ohio politician) (1821–1898), American congressman from Ohio
- James H. Monroe (1944–1967), American soldier and Medal of Honor recipient
- James O. Monroe (1888–1968), American politician and newspaper editor
- James T. Monroe, American scholar and translator of Arabic
- James W. Monroe, U.S. Army general
- USS James Monroe, a Lafayette-class ballistic missile submarine
- James Monroe, a character in the serial Ace of Spades

== See also ==
- Presidency of James Monroe
- The James Monroe, a residential skyscraper in Newport, Jersey City, New Jersey
- James Monro (1838–1920), lawyer and police commissioner
- James Munro (disambiguation)
- James Munroe (disambiguation)
