= Donald Munro =

Donald Munro may refer to:

- Donald Munro of Foulis (died 1039), first traditional chief of the Clan Munro
- Donald W. Munro (1916–1998), Progressive Conservative party member of the Canadian House of Commons
- Donald B. Munro (died 1984), Ontario mayor
- Donald L. Munro, American politician from Pennsylvania
- Donald Munro (New Brunswick politician) (1885–?), member of the Legislative Assembly of New Brunswick and Mayor of Woodstock, New Brunswick
- Donnie Munro (born 1953), Scottish musician
- Don Munro (Australian footballer) (1891–1954), Australian rules footballer for Fitzroy
- Donald Munro (moderator) (1860–1937), Moderator of the General Assembly of the Free Church of Scotland in 1918

== See also ==
- Donald Monro (disambiguation)
- Donald Monroe, author
