= Munroe station =

Munroe station may refer to:

- Munroe station (MBTA), a disused train station in Lexington, Massachusetts, United States
- Munroe station (PAAC), a light rail station in Pittsburgh, Pennsylvania, United States

== See also ==
- Monroe station (disambiguation)
