= George Munro =

George Munro may refer to:

- George Munro, 5th Baron of Foulis, Scottish clan chief of the 13th century.
- George Munro, 10th Baron of Foulis (died 1452), Scottish clan chief.
- George Munro, 1st of Newmore (1602–1693), fought as a royalist for King Charles II of England, Scotland and Ireland.
- George Munro, 1st of Auchinbowie, fought as a royalist for King William III of England, Scotland and Ireland.
- George Munro, 1st of Culcairn (died 1746), fought as a royalist for King George I of Great Britain and George II of Great Britain.
- George Munro (philanthropist) (1825–1896), Canadian educator, dime novel publisher, and philanthropist
- George Campbell Munro (1866–1963), botanist and ornithologist

== See also ==
- George Monro (disambiguation)
