= Munroe (disambiguation) =

Munroe is a surname.

Munroe may also refer to:

== Places ==
- Munroe Falls, Ohio, USA
- Munroe Lake, Manitoba, Canada
- Munroe Island, Kerala, India
- Munroe Island (Philippines), Philippines
- Munroe Tavern, Lexington, MA, USA

=== Facilities and structures ===
- Munroe (PAT station), Pittsburgh, PA, USA
- Munroe (MBTA station), Lexington, MA, USA

== Astronomical Objects ==
- 4942 Munroe (asteroid)

== Other uses ==
- Munroe effect, the partial focusing of blast energy caused by a hollow or void cut into a piece of explosive

== See also ==
- Monro (disambiguation)
- Monroe (disambiguation)
- Munro (disambiguation)
