= Farley Katz =

American humorist (born 1984)

Farley Katz (born 1984) is an American humorist. He was a staff cartoonist for The New Yorker. In October 2008, The New Yorker magazine online published an interview and "Cartoon Off" between Katz and Randall Munroe, in which each cartoonist drew a series of four humorous cartoons.

Katz is the author of the book Journal of a Schoolyard Bully.

He graduated from Harvard University where he drew cartoons and was an editor for the Harvard Lampoon.
