= How To (book) =

2019 book by Randall Munroe

- Cover of the United States release
- Author: Randall Munroe
- Language: English
- Published: September 3, 2019
- Publisher: Riverhead Books
- Publication place: United States
- ISBN: 9780525537090
- Website: https://xkcd.com/how-to/

How To: Absurd Scientific Advice for Common Real-World Problems is a book by Randall Munroe in which the author provides absurd suggestions based in scientific fact on ways to solve some common and some absurd problems. The book contains a range of possible real-world and absurd problems, each the focus of a single chapter. The book was released on September 3, 2019.

== Production ==
Munroe had the idea for How To while working on his 2014 book, What If?, which answered questions submitted by readers of Munroe's blog. While working on the book, Munroe started to think about problems that he would like to solve and the consequences of solving them in different ways.

While researching his answers for How To, Munroe investigated how to dry out a phone that has fallen in water. However, he could not find a reliable practical answer, and did not want to give readers bad information. Ultimately, Munroe decided to omit the question from his book.

As part of researching the chapter on "How to Catch a Drone", Munroe reached out to professional tennis player Serena Williams to knock a drone out of the sky by hitting it with a tennis ball. Williams' husband Alexis Ohanian piloted the drone, making it hover just over a tennis net, and Williams successfully batted it down on her third try.

How To is Munroe's third published book, after What If? in 2014 and Thing Explainer in 2015.

== Chapters ==
How To contains the following chapters, with each chapter exploring a range of solutions, both plausible and absurd, to a particular problem:

1. How to Jump Really High
2. How to Throw a Pool Party
3. How to Dig a Hole
4. How to Play the Piano
5. How to Make an Emergency Landing
6. How to Cross a River
7. How to Move
8. How to Keep Your House from Moving
9. How to Build a Lava Moat
10. How to Throw Things
11. How to Play Football
12. How to Predict the Weather
13. How to Play Tag
14. How to Ski
15. How to Mail a Package
16. How to Power Your House (on Earth)
17. How to Power Your House (on Mars)
18. How to Make Friends
19. How to Send a File
20. How to Charge Your Phone
21. How to Take a Selfie
22. How to Catch a Drone
23. How to Tell if You're a Nineties Kid
24. How to Win an Election
25. How to Decorate a Tree
26. How to Get Somewhere Fast
27. How to Be On Time
28. How to Dispose of This Book

In between chapters, there are a few short answers: How to Listen to Music, How to Chase a Tornado, How to Go Places, How to Blow Out Birthday Candles, How to Walk a Dog, and How to Build a Highway. After the index appears How to Change a Light Bulb, drawn on one page in the style of a comic strip. Exclusive to the UK paperback edition, there is an additional chapter, How to Make Money.

== Reception ==
The book was received positively by critics. Stephen Shankland of CNET stated that it "will make you laugh as you learn". Shankland contended that How To forces the reader to "appreciate the glorious complexity of our universe and the amazing breadth of humanity’s effort to comprehend it" through its "hilariously edifying answers" to some everyday and some improbable questions. Publishers Weekly described the text as "generously laced with dry humor" with "Munroe's comic stick-figure art [being an] added bonus."
