= John R. Palmer =

American politician

Member of the Michigan House of Representatives from the Calhoun County 1st district
- In office January 1, 1853 – December 31, 1854
- Preceded by: District established
- Succeeded by: Daniel Dunakin

Personal details
- Born: June 27, 1809 New York
- Died: May 1, 1877 (aged 67)
- Party: Democratic

John R. Palmer (June 27, 1809 – May 1, 1877) was a Michigan politician.

== Early life ==
Palmer was born on June 27, 1809, in New York. In 1844, Palmer moved to Michigan.

== Career ==
Palmer was a farmer. On November 2, 1852, Palmer was elected to the Michigan House of Representatives where he represented the Calhoun County 1st district from January 5, 1853, to December 31, 1854.

== Death ==
Palmer died on May 1, 1877.
