= Time (xkcd) =

Long-form xkcd strip by Randall Munroe

- The first frame of the comic
- Publication date: March 25 – July 26, 2013

Creative team
- Writer: Randall Munroe
- Website: xkcd.com/1190/

"Time" is the 1,190th strip of Randall Munroe's webcomic xkcd. Beginning with a single frame published at midnight on March 25, 2013, the image was updated every 30 minutes until March 30, 2013, and then every hour for 118 days (123 days in total), ending on July 26 with a total of 3,102 unique images. Each image represented a single frame in a larger story.

The strip's story, set 11,000 years in the future in the basin of the Mediterranean Sea during a supposed recurrence of the Zanclean flood, features two characters journeying uphill to discover where the rising water is originating. By the end of the story, the characters return home to save their people. Described by Glen Tickle of Geekosystem as Munroe's "magnum opus", "Time" attracted significant attention and was well received online; several projects, wikis and web communities were built about it. In 2014, it won the Hugo Award in the Best Graphic Story category.

== Plot ==
"Time" begins with two stick figures, a woman and a man, building a sand castle complex on a beach. The woman notes that the sea (visible on the right side of the frame) is rising. After construction is completed, and after temporarily stopping the sea from eroding the castle away, the two decide to go on a journey to discover the cause behind the rising sea level. As they leave, the frames slowly fade to white, as the rising water begins to destroy the castle.

The two journey out, finding a river that they were unaware of; the couple follow the river and make observations as they go. While resting under a tree, the man finds the remains of a campsite, discovering that the area they were in had been inhabited. Later, they find another campsite and massive, oddly shaped trees with markings on one. They find a decrepit boat they could use to cross the river, but continue up into the mountains. While climbing a small hill, the man sees a snake and tumbles down on the woman. Further on, they hear chirping in a tree, and pause briefly to observe a bird and its chick in a nest. While resting at a miniature river, the woman discovers that they are on the cliff of a large waterfall. After contemplating it, they decide to discover what the mountains are like.

They climb up and eventually reach a small abandoned house. While there, the man is attacked by a big cat, which the woman routs with a piece of wood. The man is unscathed, but the woman sustains a wound to her leg, which they wrap with a flag brought from when they were creating the sand castle. They decide that traveling in search of people towards the top of the mountain (where they see a structure) would be a better medical option than heading back home, so they continue towards the mountaintops. As night falls, they rest in the wild. The man takes the first guard shift, and the stars in the night sky time-lapse behind him. He wakes the woman to take his turn to sleep. When he eventually wakes up, the two characters press on with the intention of turning back if they do not find people.

Frame 2,915 from the comic, during the discussion with one of the natives. In this frame, she reveals herself as their leader.

They find a small structure, and from its top the woman spots people. As they leave the structure, they think of their sand castle, wondering about its fate. The screen cuts to a scene of a lone bucket floating on a body of water, then cuts back. After more traveling, the characters make contact with three androgynous people wearing headgear. The woman attempts to communicate, but the native language of the people is incomprehensible. She shows them her wound, and they treat it with a paste. The group then beckon the man and woman to follow them into town. After receiving water, the man and woman sleep. The following morning, the man communicates with one of the locals by drawing pictures in the dirt. The local informs them that the sea level is, in fact, rising, and that the two characters should follow and see someone to talk to. They rest along the way, where the man and woman look over a map from one of the locals. They continue to a city, and there is a castle behind it. They are led to the natives' leader who, speaking the language of the protagonists to some extent, explains the reason for the sea rising.

She reveals that her people had erected a berm to keep what she calls "the planet's mightiest river" at bay, which is days away from breaking through and flooding the man and woman's home. She shows them a map of the inland sea, and a drawing of the coastline as it had appeared in the distant past, and will appear again when the surrounding basin is flooded. This coastline is the same as the present-day western Mediterranean Sea, signifying that the story takes place long after the sea had been separated from the Atlantic Ocean and largely dried up.

The leader explains that the journey back to reach their home to warn the others living there would take too long and that they have no choice but to remain with the mountain people. Ignoring her, the man and woman flee and run back home, taking some of the mountain people's provisions on the way out and guiding themselves with maps that the woman had stolen.

Upon returning home, the two characters attempt to coordinate an escape with their own people. A girl appears in a boat she constructed from wood used in the sand castle from the beginning of the story; this causes the tribe to abandon their original plans and instead attempt to float up the river. After expanding the boat, the group boards it and sets sail. Soon they join the remaining members of their tribe, who had been in their own smaller boat. After a night of drifting, while the others are still asleep, the man and woman spot land. When they reach it, the story ends with the man and woman, last to depart, going into the new wilderness to explore it, with the boat seen bobbing in the water. The final five frames of the comic, in which the boat is bobbing on the water, are currently rotating in an undetermined pattern for the comic on the xkcd website.

== Conception and development ==
Webcomic creator Randall Munroe described his reasons for creating "Time" in an interview with Rolling Stone, where he stated that he came up with the idea as he was pondering the space between animation and a daily comic, wanting to do something "in between". In an interview with Computer Sweden, Munroe stated that he had never seen anyone attempt such a project before and that he "wanted to see if it would work". Munroe noted that, in some cases, "things become more interesting if they are difficult to access", such as in books that deliberately make the story more complicated. He hoped that, as people slowly got into it, the world and language would excite readers on a deeper level. According to Munroe, nothing like "Time" had been done before because it is difficult to reach people once every hour without a tool such as the Internet.

Following the ending of his story, Munroe explained many of its details and furthered its context in an article on Wired. He noted that "Time" is set 11,000 years in the future, in a future civilization with humanity's present civilization long extinct. It takes place in the basin of the Mediterranean Sea, which has largely evaporated following tectonic activity shutting it off from the Atlantic Ocean. This is modeled after a similar occurrence of this incident approximately 5 million years ago—the Messinian salinity crisis. The eventual flooding crisis at the end of the story is a supposed recurrence of the Zanclean flood. Munroe reportedly researched the plants and wildlife of the region and added them into the comic, offering hints as to the story's location. According to Munroe, "I got suggestions from botanists and herpetologists, and I had a file with details on every species the characters encountered or talked about, like dwarf palms, juniper trees, horned vipers, and sand boas".

In the scene where the man and woman sleep in shifts, a time lapse of stars in the night sky occupies the background. This was done with the help of astronomy software to render the night sky of the characters' location, in their specific time, accounting for projected precession of the equinoxes and stellar motion over the next 11,000 years. The starfield lacks the star Antares, as Munroe consulted with astronomer Phil Plait, who told him that the star may go supernova before the date in which "Time" is set.

=== Language ===
The mountain natives' language (and the script it is written in) was created with the help of a linguist, and has as of yet not been deciphered, although the meaning of some of the words and symbols have been deduced. Munroe has not given the language a name, but fans dubbed it "Beanish" (deriving from the natives' beanie-like hats), a name that was later picked up by the media. Munroe has opened the possibility of using the language in a future comic.

== Publishing ==
The frames of "Time" were originally updated every 30 minutes; however, after frame 240, the updates became hourly. After frame 2440, five frames appeared in quick succession, showing a meteor shooting through the sky, but the updates then returned to hourly. The technical details about the comic's publishing were described on an independent website as follows:

Inside the page is a script and it uses simple Ajax to download a new image every so often. The script is minified and so not easy to follow, but there are a number of programmers taking the time to figure it out. The request redirects server side to a new image and it is difficult or impossible to get at the future images (they might not have been created yet) but if you know the links you can get the previous images. This has resulted in a number of sites putting the frames together to produce either an animated gif or a pseudo video that downloads each frame in turn.

== Reception ==
"Time" was received well online, with Cory Doctorow of Boing Boing saying it was "coming along nicely" during publishing with an "astounding backstory" upon its conclusion. Wired's Laura Hudson called the journey "epic", and Glen Tickle of Geekosystem referred to the comic as Munroe's "magnum opus". Tasha Robinson from The A.V. Club said of the comic, "This is slow-paced entertainment for a fast-paced world, but it's also the kind of nifty experiment that keeps people coming back to XKCD, which at its best isn't a strip comic so much as an idea factory and a shared experience." "Time" also got mentions from The Verge writer Jeff Blagdon and Washington Post blogger Andrea Peterson. In August 2014 the comic won the Hugo Award in the Best Graphic Story category. Doctorow accepted the award on behalf of Munroe, dressing as Munroe had drawn him in earlier strips "Blagofaire" and "1337: Part 5".

The comic garnered "obsessive" attention from viewers on xkcd's forum, with a discussion thread that amassed 2,689 pages and 107,526 posts by the shutdown of the forum in 2019. Fans created a wiki specific to "Time", and a glossary of invented terms to describe the comic.
