= Daniel Dunakin =

American politician

Member of the Michigan House of Representatives from the Calhoun County 1st district
- In office January 1, 1855 – December 31, 1856
- Preceded by: John R. Palmer
- Succeeded by: James Monroe

Personal details
- Born: April 19, 1810 Niagara County, New York
- Died: May 16, 1875 (aged 65)
- Party: Republican

Daniel Dunakin (April 19, 1810 – May 16, 1875) was a Michigan politician.

== Early life ==
Dunakin was born on April 19, 1810, in Niagara County, New York. In 1834, Dunakin settled on a farm in Eckford Township, Michigan Territory.

== Career ==
On November 8, 1854, Dunakin was elected to the Michigan House of Representatives where he represented the Calhoun County 1st district from January 3, 1855, to December 31, 1856.

== Personal life ==
Dunakin was a Free Will Baptist.

== Death ==
Dunakin died on May 16, 1875.
