= Xkcd =

Serial webcomic by Randall Munroe

xkcd
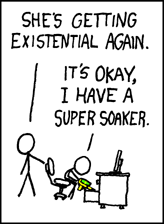
- Panel from "Philosophy"
- Author: Randall Munroe
- Website: xkcd.com
- Current status/schedule: Mondays, Wednesdays, and Fridays
- Launch date: September 2005; 21 years ago
- Genre(s): Comedy, geek humor

xkcd (sometimes styled XKCD) is a serial webcomic created in 2005 by American author Randall Munroe. The comic's tagline describes it as "a webcomic of romance, sarcasm, math, and language". Munroe states on the comic's website that the name of the comic is not an acronym but "just a word with no phonetic pronunciation".

The subject matter of the comic varies from statements on life and love to mathematical, programming, and scientific in-jokes. Some strips feature simple humor or pop-culture references. It has a cast of stick figures, and the comic occasionally features landscapes, graphs, charts, and intricate mathematical patterns such as fractals. New cartoons are added on Mondays, Wednesdays, and Fridays every week, with few exceptions.

Munroe has released six spinoff books from the comic. The first book, published in 2010 and titled xkcd: volume 0, was a series of selected comics from his website. His 2014 book What If? is based on his blog of the same name that answers unusual science questions from readers in a light-hearted way that is scientifically grounded. The What If? column on the site is updated with new articles from time to time. His 2015 book Thing Explainer explains scientific concepts using only the one thousand most commonly used words in English. A fourth book, How To, which is described as "a profoundly unhelpful self-help book", was released on September 3, 2019. A fifth book, What If? 2, was released on September 13, 2022. A revised edition of What If?, titled What If? 10th Anniversary Edition, was released on November 26, 2024.

On August 31, 2023, a spinoff YouTube channel named xkcd's What If? was created, dedicated to adapting the What If? books into video format, narrated by Munroe and produced by Neptune Studios LLC. It started posting videos on November 29, 2023.

== History ==
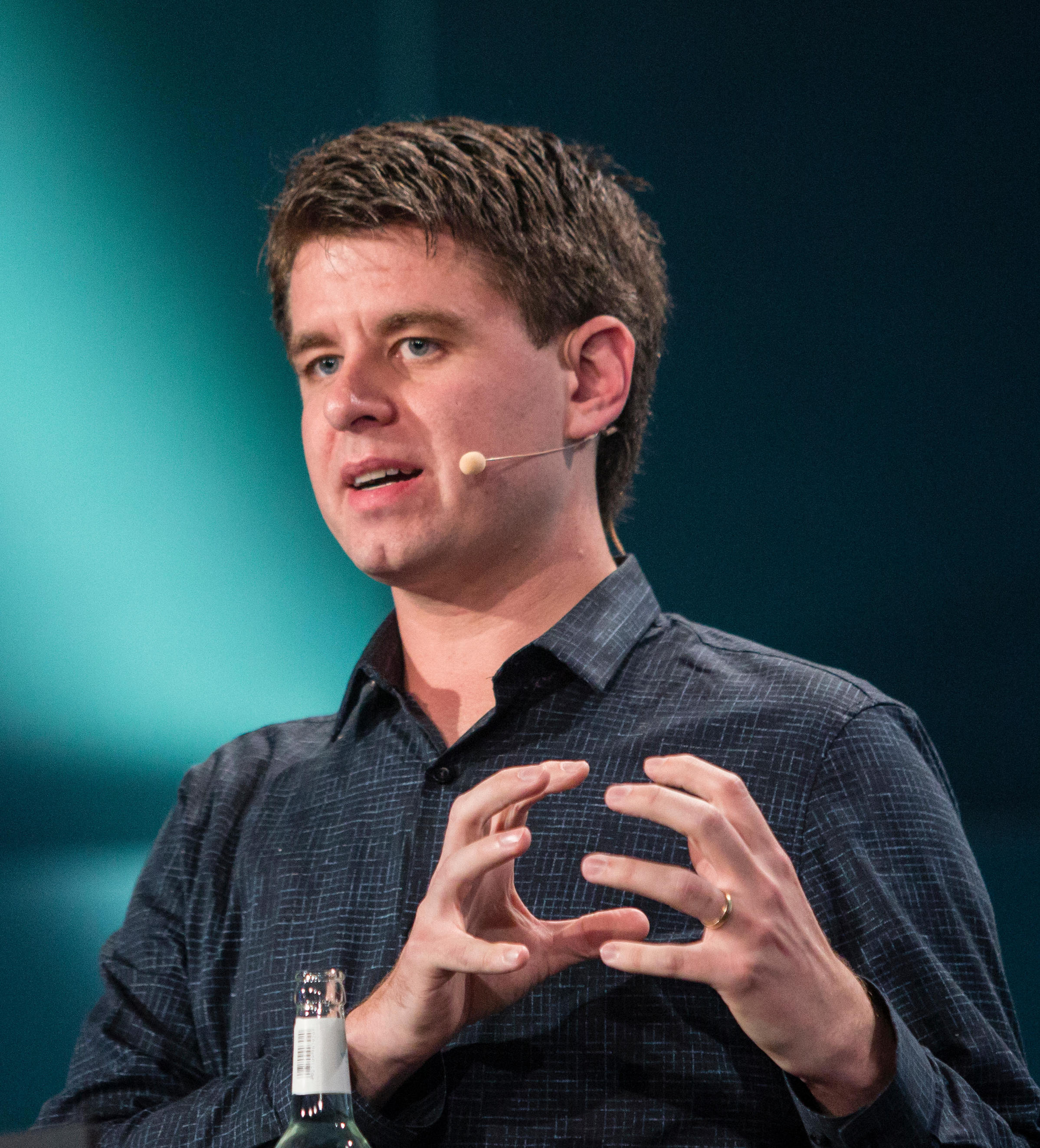
Randall Munroe in 2016

As a student, Munroe often drew charts, maps, and "stick figure battles" in the margins of his school notebooks, besides solving mathematical problems unrelated to his classes. By the time he graduated from college, Munroe's "piles of notebooks" became too large and he started scanning the images he thought were "funny or pretty".

xkcd began in September 2005, when Munroe decided to scan his doodles and put them on his personal website. According to Munroe, the comic's name has no particular significance and is simply a four-letter word without a phonetic pronunciation, something he describes as "a treasured and carefully guarded point in the space of four-character strings". In January 2006, the comic was split off into its own website, created in collaboration with Derek Radtke.

In May 2007, the comic garnered widespread attention by depicting online communities in geographic form. Various websites were drawn as continents, each sized according to their relative popularity and located according to their general subject matter. This put xkcd at number two on the Syracuse Post-Standard's "The new hotness" list. By 2008, xkcd was able to financially support Munroe and Radtke "reasonably well" through the sale of thousands of T-shirts per month. Munroe recalled that the comic's success was so great he decided to leave NASA.

On September 19, 2012, "Click and Drag" was published, which featured a panel which can be explored via clicking and dragging its contents. It immediately triggered positive response on social websites and forums. The large image nested in the panel measures 165,888 pixels wide by 79,872 pixels high. Munroe later described it as "probably the most popular one I ever put on the Internet" and considered it one of his own favorites.

"Time" began publication at midnight EDT on March 25, 2013, with the comic's image updating every 30 minutes until March 30, when they began to change every hour, lasting for over four months. The images constitute time lapse frames of a story, with the title text originally reading "Wait for it.", later changed to "RUN." and changed again to "The end." on July 26. The story began with a male and female character building a sandcastle complex on a beach who then embark on an adventure to learn the secrets of the sea. On July 26, the comic superimposed a frame (3094) with the phrase "The End". Tasha Robinson of The A.V. Club wrote of the comic: "[...] the kind of nifty experiment that keeps people coming back to XKCD, which at its best isn't a strip comic so much as an idea factory and a shared experience". Cory Doctorow mentioned "Time" in a brief article on Boing Boing on April 7, saying the comic was "coming along nicely". The 3,099-panel "Time" comic ended on July 26, 2013, and was followed by a blog post summarizing the journey. In 2014, it won the Hugo Award for Best Graphic Story.

Around 2007, Munroe drew all the comics on paper, then scanned and processed them on a tablet computer (a Fujitsu Lifebook). In 2014, he was using a Cintiq graphics tablet for drawing (like many other cartoonists), alongside a laptop for coding tasks.

== Influences ==
Munroe has been a fan of newspaper comic strips since childhood, describing xkcd as an "heir" to Charles M. Schulz's Peanuts. Despite this influence, xkcd's quirky and technical humor would have been difficult to syndicate. In webcomics, Munroe has said that "one can draw something that appeals to 1 percent of the audience—1 percent of United States, that is three million people, that is more readers than small cartoons can have". Munroe cited the lack of a need for editorial control due to the low bar of access to the Internet as "a salvation".

== Recurring themes ==
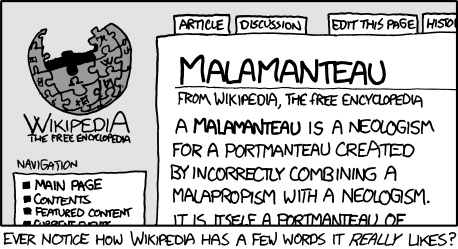
"Malamanteau", with the title text "The article has twenty-three citations, one of which is an obscure manuscript from the 1490s and the other twenty-two are arguments on Language Log."

While there is no specific storyline to the webcomic, there are some recurring themes and characters. Recurring themes of xkcd include "technology, science, mathematics and relationships". xkcd frequently features jokes related to popular culture, such as Guitar Hero, Facebook, Vanilla Ice, Linux, and Wikipedia.

There are many strips opening with the words "My Hobby:", usually depicting the nondescript narrator character describing some type of humorous or quirky behavior. However, not all strips are intended to be humorous. Romance and relationships are frequent themes, and other xkcd strips consist of complex depictions of landscapes. Many xkcd strips refer to Munroe's "obsession" with potential Velociraptor attacks.

References to Wikipedia articles or to Wikipedia as a whole have occurred several times in xkcd. (Note: Other comics related to Wikipedia include: Munroe, Randall (January 24, 2007). "The Problem with Wikipedia". xkcd. Archived from the original on December 17, 2011.; ——— (November 16, 2011). "Citogenesis". xkcd.; ——— (July 7, 2008). "In Popular Culture". xkcd. Archived from the original on December 25, 2011.; ——— (January 30, 2013). "Star Trek into Darkness". xkcd. Archived from the original on March 12, 2021.; ——— (April 1, 2013). "Externalities". xkcd. Archived from the original on April 1, 2013.; ——— (August 25, 2014). "Teenage Mutant Ninja Turtles". xkcd. Archived from the original on August 26, 2014.; ——— (March 13, 2019). "Meta Collecting". xkcd. Archived from the original on March 16, 2019.) A facsimile of a made-up Wikipedia entry for "malamanteau" (a stunt word created by Munroe to poke fun at Wikipedia's writing style) provoked a controversy within Wikipedia that was picked up by various media outlets. Another strip depicted an example of a topic that Wikipedia could not cover neutrally—a fictional donation to either anti-abortion or abortion-rights activists, determined by the word count in a Wikipedia article on the event where the donation was announced being either odd or even. Wikipedia is also depicted as an extension of one's mind, allowing them to access far more information than normally. Another comic depicted the [citation needed] feature of Wikipedia.

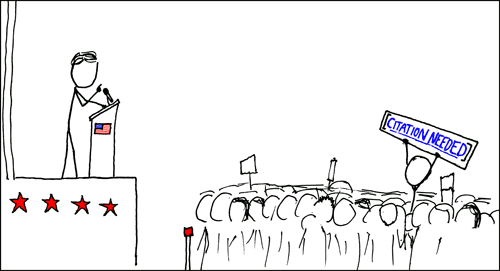
"Wikipedian Protester", with title text "SEMI-PROTECT THE CONSTITUTION"

Nearly all xkcd strips have a tooltip when hovering over the comic, known as a title text. It usually contains an addition or expansion of the joke in the main comic, or an explanation of the joke in very early comics.

One of the few recurring characters is a man wearing a flat black hat, apparently based on Aram, from the webcomic Men in Hats. He has dedicated his life to causing confusion and harm to others just for his own entertainment. He is commonly referred to as "Black Hat" or "Black Hat Guy" in the community. He gained a girlfriend, commonly named "Danish" by the community and just as cruel as he is, during the course of a small series called "Journal".

Another recurring character is a man with a beret, sometimes simply referred to as "Beret Guy". He seems to be naïve, optimistic, obsessed with bakeries, and completely out of touch with reality. He also has magical abilities, which often manifest in the creation of situations or objects that support his overly optimistic worldview, even when in direct violation of societal norms or the laws of physics; an example is his startup making incredible amounts of money despite his not even knowing what it does. In one instance, he hired Lin-Manuel Miranda as an engineer, and in another instance, sprouted literal "endless wings".

Geographical maps, including their various different formats and creation methods, are a frequently recurring theme in the comic. On occasion these maps have been mentioned by analysts due to their imaginative or original presentation of figures or statistics. In the comic "2016 Election Map", colored stick figures are used to display how people voted in the 2016 United States presidential election according to their region. It was praised as being a strong visualization tool for the election outcome.

== Inspired activities ==
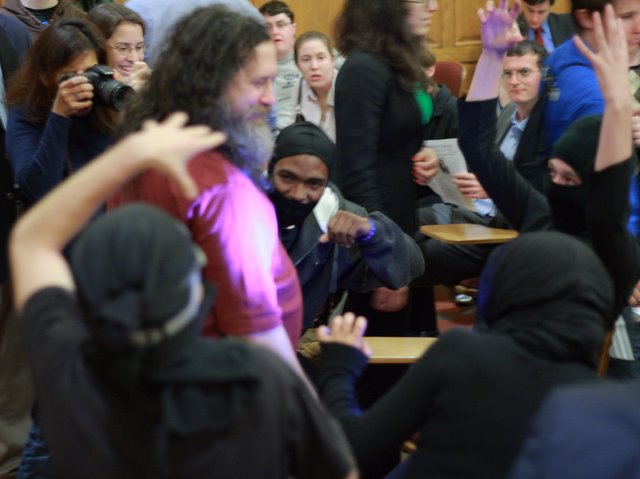
Hoax attack on Richard Stallman by students dressed as ninjas. Inspired by "Open Source"

On several occasions, fans have been motivated by Munroe's comics to carry out the subject of a particular drawing or sketch offline. Some notable examples include:

- Richard Stallman was confronted by students dressed as ninjas before speaking at the Yale Political Union – inspired by "Open Source".
- On September 23, 2007, hundreds of people gathered at Reverend Thomas J. Williams Park, 42.39561°N 71.13051°W, in North Cambridge, Massachusetts, whose coordinates were mentioned in "Dream Girl". Munroe appeared, commenting, "Maybe wanting something does make it real", reversing the conclusion he drew in the last frame of the same strip.

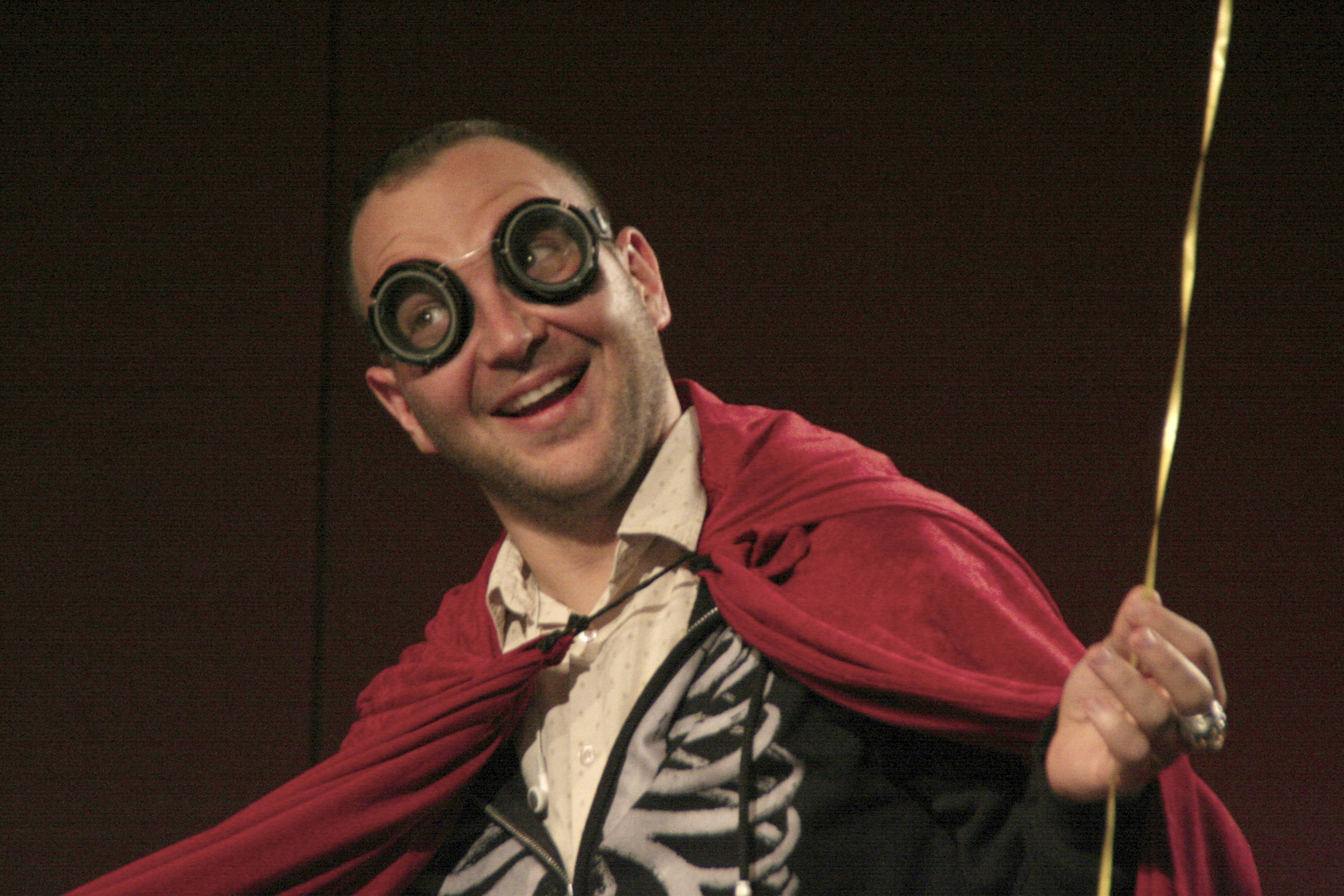
Cory Doctorow wearing a red cape and a pair of goggles based on his appearance in xkcd. Doctorow later wore the costume again while accepting a Hugo Award on Munroe's behalf.

- When animated xkcd strip "Time" won a Hugo Award for Best Graphic Story in August 2014, it was accepted by Cory Doctorow on behalf of Munroe, dressing as Munroe had drawn him in an earlier strip, "1337: Part 5".
- xkcd readers began sneaking chess boards onto roller coasters after "Chess Photo" was published.
- The game of 'geohashing' has gained more than 1,000 players, who travel to random coordinates calculated by the algorithm described in "Geohashing".
- In October 2007, a group of researchers at University of Southern California's Information Sciences Institute conducted a census of the Internet and presented their data using a Hilbert curve, which they stated was inspired by an xkcd comic that used a similar technique. Inspired by the same comic, the Carna botnet used a Hilbert curve to present data in their 2012 Internet Census.
- Based on "Packages", programmers have set up programs to automatically find an item for sale on the Internet for $1.00 every day.
- In response to "Password Strength", Dropbox shows two messages reading "lol" and "Whoa there, don't take advice from a webcomic too literally ;)" when attempting to register with the password "correcthorsebatterystaple". ArenaNet recommended that Guild Wars 2 users create secure passwords following the guidelines of the same comic.
- The Python Standard Library module "antigravity", when run, opens the xkcd comic "Python". On June 4, 2009, a function was added into the "antigravity" module that implements the geohashing algorithm (which is inspired by the 426th xkcd comic, also titled "Geohashing"), according to the commit history of CPython's git repository.
- Inspired by the xkcd comic "Online Communities 2", Slovak artist Martin Vargic created the "Map of the Internet 1.0."
- In 2008, Munroe posted a parody of the Discovery Channel's I Love the World advertising campaign on xkcd, which was later reenacted by Neil Gaiman, Wil Wheaton, Cory Doctorow, Hank Green, and others. This reenactment was posted to YouTube with the title "We Love xkcd".
- Munroe's 2012 comic "Up-Goer Five" on the Saturn V rocket inspired the "Up-Goer Five Challenge" for scientists. The original comic described the rocket only using the one thousand most frequent words in contemporary fiction; in the same way, the challenge is for scientists to describe their journal articles and scientific papers with extremely basic language. More generally, even when not adhering to the original strict list, the comic has been cited as an example of the merits in avoiding too much jargon that can make scientific papers unreadable to the general public.
- The comic "Security", in which two characters plan to bypass a cryptocurrency owner's encrypted laptop by beating him with a wrench until he gives them the password, is the inspiration for the term "wrench attacks", in which criminals attempt to force a cryptocurrency owner to give them passwords and other information. The term was mentioned following the kidnapping of an Italian man in New York City.

=== Academic research ===
In addition, a number of researchers have acknowledged particular xkcd comics as the source of inspiration for their scientific articles. These academic contributions include:

- In 2007, two researchers published an article titled "High Level Internet Scale Traffic Visualization Using Hilbert Curve Mapping". It was inspired by the comic "Map of the Internet".
- Three Microsoft Research employees published the paper "Failure is a Four-Letter Word: a Parody in Empirical Research" in 2011. They were inspired by "Significant".
- The "Password Strength" comic has inspired the creation of two scientific articles. The first one is the 2012 article "Correct horse battery staple: exploring the usability of system-assigned passphrases". The second paper was published in 2015, and bears the title "How to Memorize a Random 60-Bit String".
- The 2019 paper "Stippling of 2D Scalar Fields" was inspired by "2016 Election Map".
- "Dependency" inspired an author to write the article "The Nebraska problem in open source software development".
- Two scientific publications were inspired by "Movie Narrative Charts". These articles are named "StoryFlow: Tracking the Evolution of Stories" and "HyperStorylines: Interactively untangling dynamic hypergraphs," with the latter article citing the former.

== Politics ==
The comics have featured pro-science and pro-vaccination viewpoints. Democratic presidential candidates have also received endorsements. In the fall of 2024, a banner on the homepage endorsed Kamala Harris's presidential campaign. (Note: "XKCD".)

== Awards and recognition ==
xkcd has been recognized at various award ceremonies. In the 2008 Web Cartoonists' Choice Awards, the webcomic was nominated for "Outstanding Use of the Medium", "Outstanding Short Form Comic", and "Outstanding Comedic Comic", and it won "Outstanding Single Panel Comic". xkcd was voted "Best Comic Strip" by readers in the 2007 and 2008 Weblog Awards. The webcomic was nominated for a 2009 NewNowNext Award in the category "OMFG Internet Award".

Randall Munroe was nominated for the Hugo Award for Best Fan Artist in both 2011 and 2012, and he won a Hugo Award for Best Graphic Story in 2014, for "Time".

== Books ==
In September 2009, Munroe released a book, titled xkcd: volume 0, containing selected xkcd comics. The book was published by breadpig, under a Creative Commons license, CC BY-NC 3.0, with all of the publisher's profits donated to Room to Read to promote literacy and education in the developing world. Six months after release, the book had sold over 25,000 copies. The book tour in New York City and Silicon Valley was a fundraiser for Room to Read that raised $32,000 to build a school in Salavan Province, Laos.

Munroe contributed a story titled "?" to the anthology book Machine of Death, released on October 6, 2010.

In October 2012, xkcd: volume 0 was included in the Humble Bundle eBook Bundle. It was available for download only to those who donated higher than the average donated for the other eBooks. The book was released DRM-free, in two different-quality PDF files.

On March 12, 2014, Munroe announced the book What If?: Serious Scientific Answers to Absurd Hypothetical Questions. The book was released on September 2, 2014. The book expands on the What If? blog on the xkcd website.

On May 13, 2015, Munroe announced a new book titled Thing Explainer. Eventually released on November 24, 2015, Thing Explainer is based on the xkcd strip "Up Goer Five" and only uses the thousand most commonly used words to explain different scientific devices.

On February 5, 2019, Munroe announced a fourth book, titled How To, which uses math and science to find the worst possible solutions to everyday problems. It was released on September 3, 2019.

On January 31, 2022, Munroe announced the book What If? 2: Additional Serious Scientific Answers to Absurd Hypothetical Questions, a follow-up title that continued in the same vein as the first volume in attempting to provide scientific answers to hypothetical situations submitted by readers. The book was released on September 13, 2022.

Additionally, on November 26, 2024, Munroe announced a revised edition of his original What If? book, titled What If? 10th Anniversary Edition.

== See also ==
- Saturday Morning Breakfast Cereal (SMBC) – A webcomic in a somewhat similar vein
