= Lexington Depot =

Former train station in Lexington, Massachusetts

Lexington
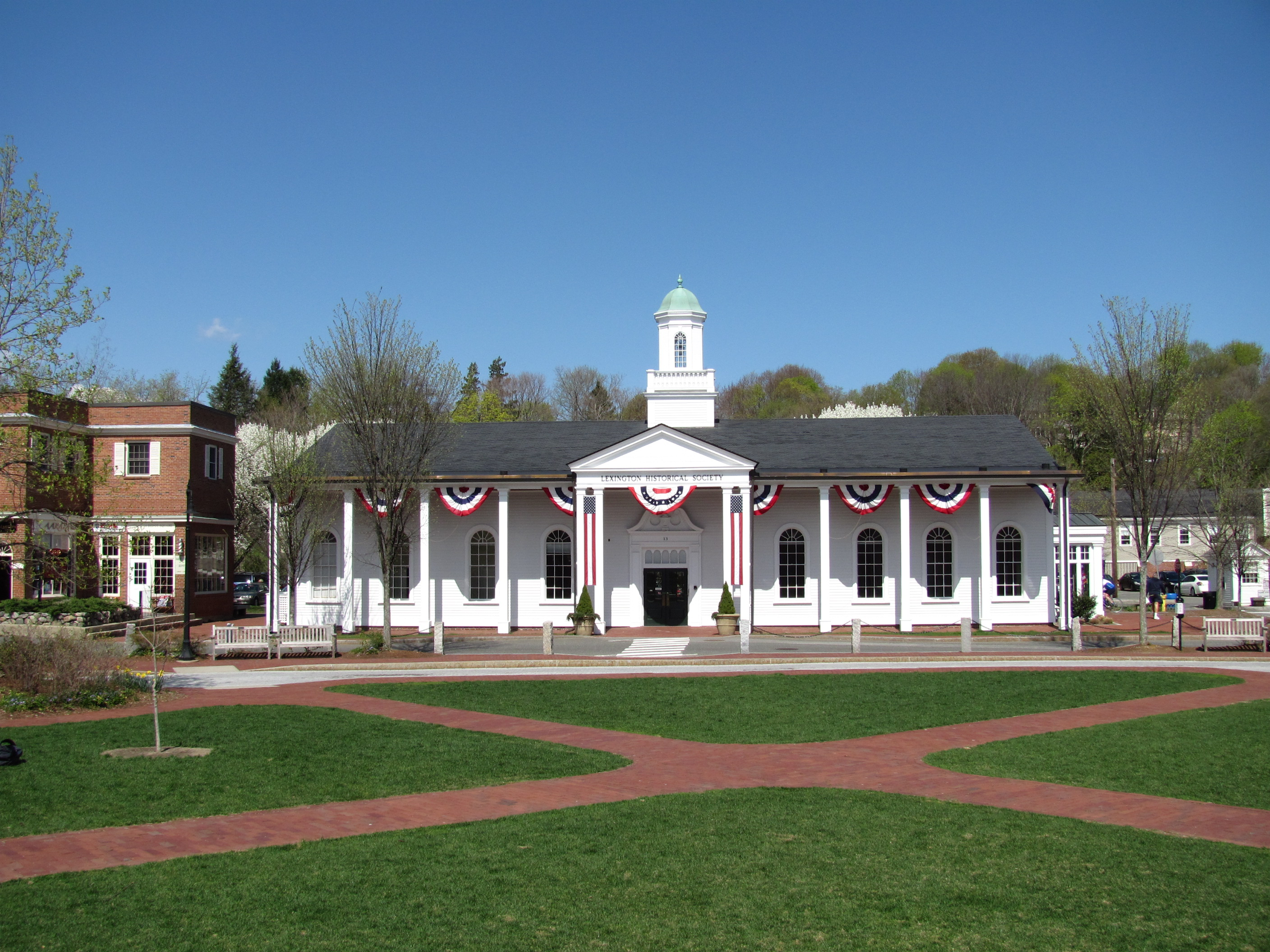
- Lexington Depot in 2010, viewed from Emery Park

General information
- Location: 13 Depot Square, Lexington, Massachusetts
- Coordinates: 42.448612°N 71.227846°W
- Owner: Massachusetts Bay Transportation Authority
- Line: Lexington Branch
- Platforms: 1
- Tracks: 1

Other information
- Fare zone: 2

History
- Opened: 1846
- Closed: January 10, 1977

Services
Preceding station	MBTA	Following station
North Lexington toward Bedford	Lexington Branch	Munroe toward North Station
Location

Lexington Depot, or Lexington station, is a former train station in Lexington, Massachusetts on the Lexington Branch.

== History ==
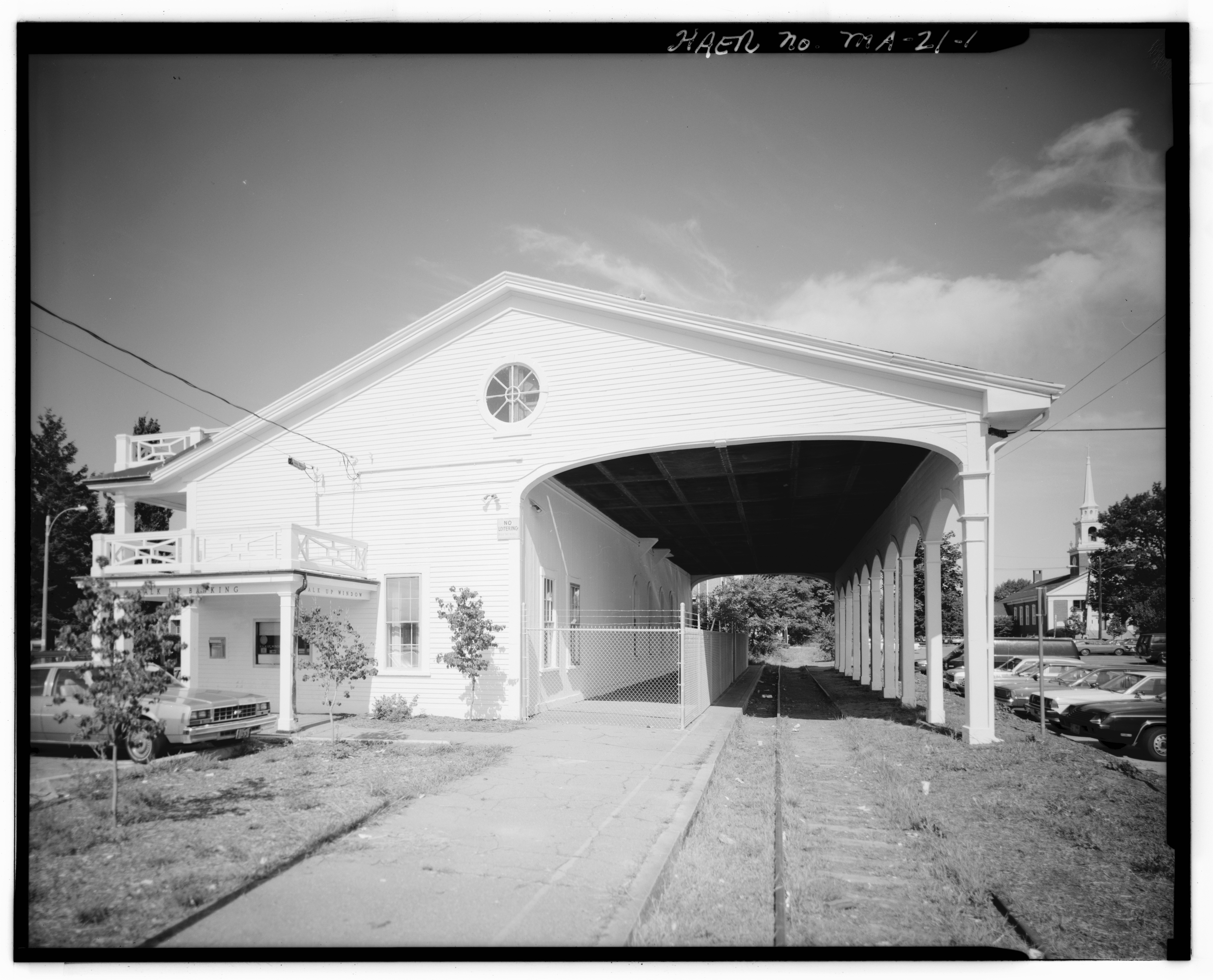
The trainshed and former platform in 1984, before the Minuteman Bikeway was built on the former trackbed

The station opened in 1846 as part of the Lexington and West Cambridge Railroad. It was damaged by fire on November 24, 1918. Although a new station was planned, the old station was instead restored in 1921–22. These renovations, designed by Kilham, Hopkins & Greeley, included a cupola and colonnade.

The line became part of the Massachusetts Bay Transportation Authority (MBTA) Commuter Rail system in the 1960s, though the station building was converted to a bank by 1968. In January 1977, following a major snowstorm which temporarily shut down the Lexington Branch, the MBTA announced that service on the branch would not be restored; in the 1980s, the MBTA planned to extend the Red Line to Route 128 along the former path of the Lexington Branch as part of the Northwest Extension, including service to Lexington station, but fierce opposition from the residents of Arlington scuttled this plan, and the Northwest Extension was cut short to Alewife.

The building now serves as the headquarters of the Lexington Historical Society. The Minuteman Bikeway runs through the former trainshed adjacent to the former station platforms. Lexington and Bedford Depot are the only remaining station buildings from the Lexington Branch.
