= Emery Park (Lexington, Massachusetts) =

Public park in Lexington, Massachusetts, U.S.

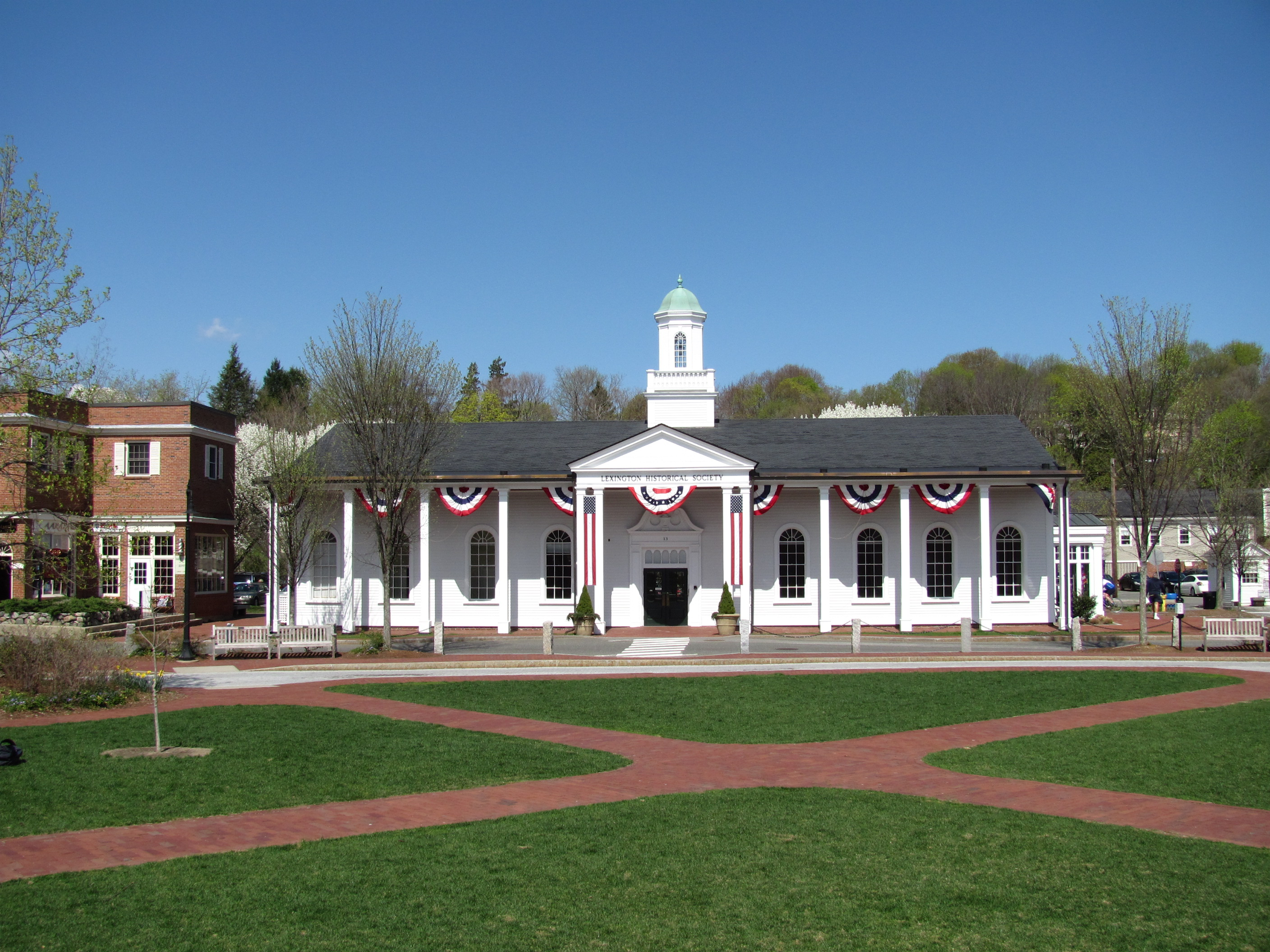
- Looking northeast to Lexington Depot
- Interactive map of Emery Park
- Type: Urban park
- Location: Lexington, Massachusetts, U.S.
- Coordinates: 42.448274°N 71.228182°W
- Created: 1922 (104 years ago)
- Owner: City of Lexington

Emery Park is an urban park in Lexington, Massachusetts, United States. Located on the northern side of Massachusetts Avenue, the park is bounded on three sides by a road called Depot Square, the original 1922 name of the park. Depot Square was named for Lexington Depot, a former train station, which is located adjacent to the park on its northeastern side.

The park was renamed for Frederick Lincoln Emery, a patent attorney, who died in 1933.
