= Monroe City =

Monroe City can refer to several places in the United States:

- Monroe City, Illinois, a small unincorporated community in the historic Bluff Precinct of Monroe County
- Monroe City, Indiana, a town in Harrison Township, Knox County
- Monroe City, Missouri, a city in Marion, Monroe, and Ralls counties
- Monroe City, Georgia, a city in and the county seat of Walton County

== See also ==
- Monroe (disambiguation)
