= James Munroe =

James Munroe may refer to:

- James Phinney Munroe (1862–1929), American author, businessman, professor and genealogist
- Jim Munroe, Canadian science fiction writer
- James Munroe (New York politician) (1815–1869), American politician
- James Munroe Canty (1865–1964), American educator, school administrator, and businessperson

== See also ==
- James Munro (disambiguation)
- James Monroe (disambiguation)
