= What If? 2 (book) =

2022 non-fiction book by Randall Munroe

What If? 2: Additional Serious Scientific Answers to Absurd Hypothetical Questions
- Front cover
- Author: Randall Munroe
- Language: English
- Genre: Non-fiction
- Publisher: Riverhead Books
- Publication date: 2022
- Publication place: United States
- Media type: Print, e-book
- Pages: 368 pages
- ISBN: 0525537112
- Preceded by: What If?

What If? 2: Additional Serious Scientific Answers to Absurd Hypothetical Questions is a 2022 non-fiction book by Randall Munroe. The book seeks to provide scientific answers to hypothetical questions proposed by readers of the author's webcomic, xkcd, and blog, What If? A follow-up to Munroe's 2014 title What If?, the book was released on September 13, 2022, to generally positive reviews, with Time saying, "Science isn't easy, but in Munroe's capable hands, it surely can be fun."

== Background ==
Munroe, whose career began as a roboticist for NASA, began writing his webcomic xkcd in 2005, and following its success took up cartooning full-time soon after. With many of his drawings revolving around the topics of science and mathematics, Munroe soon began receiving questions from readers about those subject areas. As a result, he created a spinoff blog titled What If? where he compiled these questions and his subsequent responses. The blog formed the basis for his 2014 book What If?, which reached the top of The New York Times Best Seller list, and inspired the creation of a second volume, What If? 2.

== Synopsis ==
What If? 2 continues in the same vein as its predecessor in attempting to provide logical, science- and mathematics-based answers to extreme hypothetical questions and situations. The author uses techniques made famous by physicist Enrico Fermi and his Fermi problems, with which the answers to seemingly complex questions can be arrived at roughly by using data that is already known. With such techniques, Munroe is able to estimate that a Tyrannosaurus rex released in New York City would need to eat half of one human per day in order to survive, and that it would take over 8,300 years to fill an Olympic-size swimming pool with your own saliva, among other hypotheticals.

Munroe includes 64 questions covered in depth in this installment, each separated into its own chapter, and dozens more are answered briefly. The book's prose is humorous, and the chapters are also frequently accompanied by the author's illustrations, done in the same minimalist, stick figure style as his webcomic. Many of the book's questions were submitted by children, and these are generally preferred by Munroe, who considers them more straightforward than the elaborate scenarios often envisioned by adults.

== Reception ==
The book was released to generally positive reviews. Time Magazine praised Munroe's amusing prose and attention to detail, and said his answers to the questions are "thorough, deeply researched, and great fun". The Wall Street Journal wrote that "the author's playful prose style and inventive illustrations make this book eminently browsable", and Kirkus Reviews called it "[a] delight for science geeks with a penchant for oddball thought experiments".
