= Monroe Center =

Monroe Center may refer to:

- Monroe Center, Illinois, a village in Ogle County
- Monroe Center, Michigan, an unincorporated community in Grand Traverse County
- Monroe Center, Wisconsin, an unincorporated community in Adams County

== See also ==
- Monroe Center Historic District, a historic district in Monroe, Connecticut
