= George Monro =

George Monro may refer to:

- George Monro (British Army officer) (1700–1757), Scottish-Irish soldier
- George Monro (politician) (1801–1878), businessman and political figure in Canada West
- George Monro (horticulturalist), 19th-century winner of the Victoria Medal of Honour

== See also ==
- George Munro (disambiguation)
