= Robert Monro (cricketer) =

English cricketer and barrister

Personal information
- Full name: Robert Webber Monro
- Born: 28 March 1838; Bloomsbury, London, England
- Died: 10 June 1908 (aged 70); Coombe Wood, Surrey, England
- Batting: Unknown
- Bowling: Unknown

Domestic team information
- Years: Team
- 1860: Oxford University

Career statistics
Competition	First-class
Matches	1
Runs scored	3
Batting average	3.00
100s/50s	–/–
Top score	3
Balls bowled	16
Wickets	0
Bowling average	–
5 wickets in innings	–
10 wickets in match	–
Best bowling	–
Catches/stumpings	1/–
- Source: Cricinfo, 19 May 2020

Robert Webber Monro (28 March 1838 – 10 June 1908) was an English first-class cricketer and barrister.

The son of John Boscawen Monro, he was born at Bloomsbury in March 1838. He was educated Harrow School, before going up to Balliol College, Oxford. While studying at Oxford, he made a single appearance in first-class cricket for Oxford University against Cambridge University in The University Match of 1860 at Lord's. Batting twice in the match, he was dismissed for 3 runs by Denzil Onslow in the Oxford first innings, while in their second innings he opened the batting and was dismissed without scoring by Robert Lang. Monro also played rackets for Oxford, pairing with William Hart Dyke against Cambridge in 1860, with the pair winning 4–2.

A student of Lincoln's Inn, he was called to the bar in January 1864. He was a clerk in the House of Lords from 1869 until 1901, before becoming chief clerk to the Parliament Office in the House of Lords from 1901 to 1903. Monro died in June 1908 at Coombe Wood, Surrey.
