= What If? (book) =

2014 non-fiction book by Randall Munroe

What If?: Serious Scientific Answers to Absurd Hypothetical Questions
- Author: Randall Munroe
- Language: English
- Subject: Science miscellanea, science humor
- Published: September 2, 2014
- Publisher: Houghton Mifflin Harcourt
- Publication place: United States
- Media type: Print
- Pages: 320 pages
- ISBN: 0-544-27299-4
- Dewey Decimal: 500
- LC Class: Q173.M965 2014
- Followed by: What If? 2
- Website: xkcd.com/what-if/ youtube.com/@xkcd_whatif/

What If?: Serious Scientific Answers to Absurd Hypothetical Questions is a 2014 non-fiction book by Randall Munroe in which the author answers hypothetical science questions sent to him by readers of his webcomic, xkcd. The book contains a selection (Note: Munroe answers more than 50 questions in the What If? book, and 51% are being answered for the first time, according to the inside of the book's jacket cover.) of questions and answers originally published on his blog What If?, along with several new ones. The book is divided into several dozen chapters, most of which are devoted to answering a unique question. (Note: Periodic sections labeled "Weird (and Worrying) Questions from the What If? Inbox" are typically composed of multiple questions. In addition, there are two sections that answer several questions about the same topic, one about lightning and one about orbital speed, as well as a short answer section that answers questions of various topics.) What If? was released on September 2, 2014, and was received positively by critics. A sequel to the book, titled What If? 2, was released on September 13, 2022. In 2024, a 10th anniversary edition of the book was released.

== Conception of the blog ==
In the introduction section of the book, Randall Munroe recounts wondering as a child whether "there were more hard things or soft things in the world", concluding that "the world contained about three billion soft things and five billion hard things". The conversation that was produced by this question impressed Munroe's mother to such a degree that she wrote it down. Though Munroe later stated that his question was rather meaningless, he used it as an example of how "thoroughly answer[ing] a stupid question can take you to some pretty interesting places".

Since 2012, Munroe has been answering unusual questions sent in by readers of xkcd on his blog What If?. The concept was inspired by a weekend program organized by the Massachusetts Institute of Technology in which volunteers can teach classes to groups of high school students on any chosen subject. Munroe signed up after hearing about it from a friend and decided to teach a class on energy. Though the lecture felt "dry" at first, once Munroe started bringing up examples from Star Wars and The Lord of the Rings, the students became more excited. The entire second half of the class was eventually spent solving mathematical and physics problems. Munroe wrote the first entries a few years before the start of the blog, based on questions he was asked that day.

Because he was delayed in getting the website online, Munroe had a lot of time thinking about the design of the blog. He eventually chose to display his entries as individual pages rather than using an infinite scrolling page, as he considers the latter more difficult to digest. Munroe usually chooses questions he already knows something interesting about, or after reading a scientific paper, he keeps an eye out for questions in which he can bring it up. Munroe has said that the volume of questions has been high enough that it is impossible to read all of them. Answering a question and writing a post takes him about a day of solid work.

== Production ==
Munroe announced in March 2014 that he had signed a deal with publisher Houghton Mifflin Harcourt to compile a large number of his What If? entries into a book. What If?: Serious Scientific Answers to Absurd Hypothetical Questions would eventually be released in September that year.

The What If? book contains a selection of questions and answers from the original blog, as well as nineteen new ones. Furthermore, Munroe selected a few unanswered questions from his inbox and collected those in separate sections in the book. Alt text, which was commonly used for illustrations on the original blog, was omitted from the book in many cases, though is sometimes included as small captions underneath the images. Instead, Munroe has added footnotes to the essays in the book to inform or entertain the reader. The cover of the book depicts a Tyrannosaurid being lowered into a Sarlacc from Star Wars, a topic not covered in the book.

What If? is Munroe's second published book, his first being XKCD: Volume 0, a curated collection of xkcd comics released in 2009. Munroe released a third book, titled Thing Explainer, in 2015, and a fourth book titled How To in 2019. A sequel, What If? 2, was announced in January 2022 and was released on September 13 that year. In May 2024, Munroe announced a 10th anniversary edition, with the book being released on November 26 of the same year.

== YouTube Series ==
In 2023, Randall Munroe launched a YouTube channel titled "xkcd's What If?", serving as a video adaptation of the books and blog. The first video was released on November 29, 2023, titled, "What if we aimed the Hubble Telescope at Earth?". The channel currently features questions from What If? and What If? 2 in animated format. Munroe narrates the videos, and they are directed by Henry Reich, who is also owner and founder of Neptune Studios LLC and the person behind the YouTube channel MinutePhysics.

== Content ==
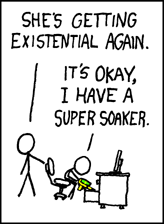
Answers are accompanied by Munroe's stick figure drawings.

What If? is mainly composed of answers Munroe gives to readers' hypothetical questions on various scientific topics. The questions tend to be rather unusual, assuming an improbable scenario and inquiring a logical conclusion to the situation. The first question Munroe answered for the blog was the following:

What would happen if you tried to hit a baseball pitched at 90% the speed of light?

— Ellen McManis through "What if?"

Using mathematics and physics, Munroe concluded such a situation would result in a nuclear fusion explosion, and that ultimately, the result would be a ruling of hit by pitch. What If? approaches its subject matter with a sense of wit and sometimes makes use of approximations to answer questions that seem impossible to solve. Most questions demand assumptions and cross-disciplinary science skills to answer, resulting in "back-of-the-envelope" calculations. What If? is interspersed with "charmingly-amateur" stick figure illustrations.

The book also features periodic sections titled "Weird (and Worrying) Questions from the What If? Inbox", which are short collections of questions Munroe had not answered because he did not "want to think about that". In an interview, Munroe stated that he "never got past the initial mental image" of the question "How cold would your teeth have to get in order for a cup of hot coffee to make them shatter on contact?"

== Reception ==
The book was received positively by critics. Ethan Gilsdorf of the Boston Globe stated that "it's fun to watch as Munroe tackles each question and examines every possible complication." According to Gilsdorf, What If? gives a view into "Munroe's playful yet existentially-tinged worldview" by contrasting cataclysmic scenarios with more heady ideas, such as examining the effects of a magnitude minus-7 Richter scale earthquake. The Huffington Post remarked that "What makes Munroe's work so fantastic is a combination of two elements: his commitment to trying to answer even the weirdest question with solid science, and his undeniable sense of humor." Rhett Allain of Wired praised What If? because even his 12-year-old son was able to enjoy it, though he found a minor error in one of the sections.

Sam Hewitt of Varsity and Marla Desat of The Escapist noted that the first print run had some issues processing mathematical symbols, as a square box was displayed where a delta is supposed to be printed.

What If? was well-received commercially upon its release and reached the top of the New York Times bestsellers list on September 21. It was also featured as the "Amazon Best Book of the Month", and was translated into 35 languages.
