= Monroe High School =

Monroe High School may refer to:

- Monroe High School (Tehachapi) — Tehachapi, California
- Monroe High School (Los Angeles) — Los Angeles, California
- Monroe High School (Florida) — the former high school for negro students in Cocoa, Florida
- Monroe High School (Michigan) — Monroe, Michigan
- Monroe High School (North Carolina) — Monroe, North Carolina
- Monroe High School (Monroe, Ohio) — Monroe, Ohio
- Monroe High School (Monroe, Oregon) — Monroe, Oregon
- Monroe High School (Wisconsin) — Monroe, Wisconsin
- Monroe High School (Washington) — Monroe, Washington
- Monroe Comprehensive High School — Albany, Georgia
- Monroe County High School (Alabama) — Monroeville, Alabama
- Monroe County High School (Kentucky) — Tompkinsville, Kentucky
- Monroe Catholic High School — Fairbanks, Alaska
- Monroe Township High School — Monroe Township, New Jersey
