= Donald Monro =

Donald Monro may refer to:

- Donald Monro (physician) (1727–1802), Scottish physician and medical author
- Donald Monro (priest), Scottish clergyman and Archdeacon/Dean of the Isles

== See also ==
- Donald Munro (disambiguation)
- Donald Monroe (1888–1972), author
