= Monroe station =

Monroe station may refer to:

- Monroe station (CTA Red Line), a subway station in Chicago, Illinois, United States
- Monroe station (CTA Blue Line), a subway station in Chicago, Illinois, United States
- Monroe station (New York), a former rapid transit station in Rochester, New York, United States
- Monroe Station (Ochopee, Florida), a now-destroyed historic gas station, United States
- Monroe Street station, a streetcar stop on the Media–Sharon Hill Line in Media, Pennsylvania, United States
- Monroe station (Louisiana), a proposed Amtrak Crescent station in Louisiana
- Monroe station (Michigan). a station in Monroe, Michigan, United States

== See also ==
- Munroe station (disambiguation)
