= Thing Explainer =

2015 non-fiction book by Randall Munroe

Thing Explainer: Complicated Stuff in Simple Words
- Cover
- Author: Randall Munroe
- Language: English
- Subject: Science miscellanea
- Publisher: Houghton Mifflin Harcourt
- Publication date: November 24, 2015
- Publication place: United States
- Media type: Print
- Website: xkcd.com/thing-explainer/

Thing Explainer: Complicated Stuff in Simple Words is a 2015 illustrated non-fiction book created by Randall Munroe, in which the author attempts to explain various complex subjects using only the 1,000 most common English words. The word "thousand" is not one of those most-used words, thus things are described using "the ten hundred words people use the most often." Munroe conceptualized the book in 2012, when drawing a schematic of the Saturn V rocket for his webcomic xkcd.

== Synopsis ==
In Thing Explainer, Randall Munroe explains the function and mechanics of 54 subjects using only the 1,000 most commonly used words in the English language. The book covers a wide range of topics, including pencils ("writing sticks"), cameras ("picture takers"), microwave ovens ("food-heating radio boxes"), airplane engines ("sky boat pushers"), and atom bombs ("machines for burning cities"). Besides technology, Munroe also explains human organs and conceptual subjects such as the periodic table. The book challenges its readers to figure out what the technical name is of the subjects it describes, and was described by Jack Schofield of ZDNet as a "puzzle game".

The book is illustrated using stick figures and includes a large number of nerdy jokes. Peter Gleick wrote for The Huffington Post that science communicators often use many uncommon and long words when describing complex topics, and that Thing Explainer explores "how to explain ideas and offer information in a simpler way".

== Conception and development ==
The concept of Thing Explainer took root in 2012, while Munroe was playing space simulator Kerbal Space Program. Here, he was giving the rockets he designed silly names, such as "Up Goer" and "Skyboat", and he began wondering if he could explain how a rocket ship works using such simplified language. Munroe drew a rendering of the Saturn V rocket using blueprints from NASA's archives and annotated it with simplified descriptions, such as labeling the boosters as the spot where "lots of fire comes out". Munroe published this drawing in his webcomic xkcd under the title "Up-Goer Five".

"Up-Goer Five" became the basis of Thing Explainer. In an interview with The New York Times, Munroe stated that "the word limit is fun, because it forces you to think about it some more". Published by Houghton Mifflin Harcourt (HMH) on November 24, 2015, the book was initially sold for US$25. Wired described Thing Explainer as the followup to Munroe's 2014 book What If?.

HMH began collaborating with Munroe in 2016 to incorporate parts of Thing Explainer in United States high school textbooks. 2016 editions of HMH's chemistry, biology, and physics textbooks include both old and new diagrams, charts, and stick figures by Munroe, as part of the HMH Science Dimensions program.

== Reception ==
Reviewing the book, Naomi Alderman of The Guardian praised the detailed illustrations in Thing Explainer, describing it as "a beautifully designed journey through the intricacies of daily life". Alderman said that Munroe produced sentences of "startling clarity" writing the book, describing ideas precisely and in a compelling manner. However, she also noted that some of the passages in the book are more difficult to comprehend due to the restriction, which she called "part of the joke", saying that the book has "a cryptic crossword feel". Stephen Shankland of CNET stated that Thing Explainer is "fun if you enjoy puzzles, annoying if you just want to learn". Shankland described the book as "clever, instructive, [and] thought-provoking", but stated that the book can come across as awkward if its reader does not take the book in the right spirit.

Science communicator Peter Gleick stated that Munroe's description of the color of light is one of the best explanations of the topic he had seen, and that school teachers could learn from the book. Blogger Cory Doctorow called the schematics Munroe used in the book as "a deceptive, seductive way of presenting the inscrutable and chaotic innards of our daily world", and proclaimed delight at watching the "linguistic backflips" Munroe goes through to express complex and technical ideas, while praising how clear the book can be.
