= James Monroe (Michigan politician) =

American politician

Member of the Michigan House of Representatives from the Calhoun County 1st district
- In office January 1, 1857 – December 31, 1860
- Preceded by: Daniel Dunakin
- Succeeded by: William Cook

Personal details
- Born: 1816 New York
- Died: July 16, 1899 (aged 82-83) Kalamazoo, Michigan
- Party: Republican

James Monroe (1816 – July 16, 1899) was a Michigan politician.

== Early life ==
James Monroe was born in New York in 1816. James' father was Stephen Monroe. In 1838, James settled in Albion, Michigan.

== Career ==
In 1848, Monroe started a stove manufacturing shop. He continued this business until 1859. In 1850, Monroe was elected Calhoun County sheriff, as a Whig. He served from 1851 to 1852. In 1854, Monroe attended the organization of the Michigan Republican Party, in Jackson. Monroe also spent the mid-1850s securing land grants for railroad companies. On November 4, 1856, Monroe was elected to the Michigan House of Representatives as a Republican, where he represented the Calhoun County 1st district from January 1, 1857, to December 31, 1860. In 1861, after the beginning of the American Civil War, President Abraham Lincoln appointed Monroe provost marshal at Albion, though Monroe only served for a few months before his resignation. Later, President Chester A. Arthur appointed Monroe United States marshal for the western district of Michigan, centered at Grand Rapids.

== Personal life ==
Monroe married Harriet around 1841. Together, they had five children.

== Death ==
Monroe later lived in Kalamazoo, Michigan. Monroe died on July 16, 1899, in Kalamazoo.
