= Monroe Railroad =

Monroe Railroad may refer to:

- Monroe Railroad (1833–1836), predecessor of the Central of Georgia Railway
  - Its successor, the Monroe Railroad and Banking Company (1836–1845)
  - The affiliated Monroe Railroad Bank
- Monroe Railroad (1904–1975), predecessor of the Georgia Railroad
