= Monroe Elementary School =

There are a number of Elementary schools named Monroe Elementary School:

- Monroe Elementary School (Santa Ana, California)
- Monroe Elementary School (Davenport, Iowa), NRHP-nominated and possibly NRHP-listed
- Monroe Elementary School (Monrovia, California)
- Monroe Elementary School (Norman, Oklahoma)
- Monroe Elementary School (Boiling Springs, Pennsylvania)
- Monroe Elementary School (Monroe, Utah)
- Monroe Elementary School (Everett, Washington)

Also:

- Monroe Elementary School (Topeka, Kansas), is home to Brown v. Board of Education National Historic Site
