= Monroe (avocado) =

Avocado cultivar

Monroe avocado
- Genus: Persea
- Species: P. americana
- Cultivar: 'Monroe'
- Origin: Possibly a cross between 'Waldin' and 'Eagle Rock'

The Monroe avocado (Persea americana 'Monroe') is a commercial named cultivar of avocado that originated in south Florida.

It became popular for its production habits and relative cold-hardiness and is widely grown in Florida.

== History ==
The original tree was grown from a seed that grew under a 'Waldin' avocado tree in Homestead, Florida, about 1932 on the property of J. J. L. Phillips. The tree first fruited in 1935 and 'Monroe' was patented in the name of Joseph R. Byrum (manager of Phillips' grove in Homestead) on August 24, 1937, receiving plant patent number 261. It was likely a hybrid of West Indian and Guatemalan types and was reportedly a cross between the 'Waldin' and 'Eagle Rock' cultivars.

One of the characteristics 'Monroe' inherited from its Guatemalan-type parent was some degree of cold-hardiness. In addition, the trees produced a large, elliptical-shaped fruit with good eating qualities and were good producers. These traits helped establish 'Monroe' as a commercial cultivar in Florida, where it was also recommended for home growing. Today 'Monroe' is grown on a large scale in Florida. Examples of 'Monroe are planted in the collections of the USDA's germplasm repository in Miami, Florida, the University of Florida's Tropical Research and Education Center in Homestead, Florida, and the Miami-Dade Fruit and Spice Park, also in Homestead.

== Description ==
The fruit averages about 2 pounds (0.91 kg) in weight at maturity, which generally occurs from December to January in Florida. The skin is green, glossy and thick. Monroe trees produce B-type flowers.
