= Wilfred Harold Munro =

Wilfred Harold Munro (August 20, 1849 – August 9, 1934) was an American historian, brother of Dana C. Munro.

He was born at Bristol, R. I., and educated at Brown (A.B., 1870; A.M., 1873). He studied in Europe at Heidelberg and Freiburg. He served at various schools in the United States and in Central and South America, and at Brown (1891–1911).

Munro edited Works of W. H. Prescott (twenty-two volumes, 1905–06) and Record Book of the Rhode Island Society of Mayflower Descendants (1911).

Munro died in Providence, Rhode Island in 1934.

== Books ==
- The History of Bristol, R. I. (1880)
- Picturesque Rhode Island (1881)
- The Most Successful American Privateer (1913)
- Some Legends of Mount Hope (1915)
- Tales of an Old Sea Port, a General Sketch of Bristol, Rhode Island (1917)
