= Monroeville =

Monroeville may refer to:

- Monroeville, Alabama
- Monroeville, California
- Monroeville, Indiana
- Monroeville, New Jersey
- Monroeville, Ohio, in Huron County
- Monroeville, Jefferson County, Ohio
- Monroeville, Pennsylvania
- Monroeville Vineyard & Winery, in New Jersey
