= Ian Munro =

Ian Munro may refer to:

- Ian Munro (computer scientist) (born 1947), Canadian computer scientist
- Ian Munro (pianist) (born 1963), Australian pianist and composer
- Ian Stafford Ross Munro (1919–1994), Australian ichthyologist and marine biologist
- Ian Munro (director) (born 1957/58), Australian film and television director and producer
- Ian Munro, Canadian politician (see Progressive Conservative Party candidates, 1993 Canadian federal election)
- Ian Munro, New Zealand born electronic music producer

== See also ==
- Ian Monroe (born 1972), artist
- Iain Munro (born 1951), Scottish footballer
- Iain Monroe, fictional character
