= Monro =

Monro is a surname. Notable people with the surname include:

== In science and education ==
- Alexander Monro (primus) (1697–1767), the founder of Edinburgh Medical School
- Alexander Monro (secundus), Scottish anatomist, physician and medical educator
- Alexander Monro (tertius) (1773–1859), Scottish medical pioneer and educator, also known as Alexander Monro III
- David Binning Monro, Scottish Homeric scholar
- John U. Monro (1912–2002), American academic administrator
- Sutton Monro (1919–1995), American statistician and engineer

== In politics ==
- Cecil Monro (1883–1996), Australian politician
- Sir Charles Carmichael Monro (1860–1929), British Army general, later Governor of Gibraltar
- David Monro (New Zealand politician) (1813–1877), New Zealand politician
- Hector Monro, Baron Monro of Langholm (1922–2006), British Conservative & Unionist Party politician

== In music ==
- Matt Monro (1930–1985), British singer
- Ryan Monro, band member in The Cat Empire
- Alison Monro, early stage name of American actress and singer-songwriter Alison Sudol (born 1984)

== In other fields ==
- Ander Monro (born 1981), Canadian rugby player
- Donald Monro (disambiguation), several people
- George Monro (disambiguation), several people
- Harold Monro (1879–1932), British poet
- Heather Monro (born 1971), the second British female orienteer to win a world championship medal
- Hector Munro (disambiguation), several people
- James Monro (1838–1920), the first Assistant Commissioner of the London Metropolitan Police
- Joanna Monro (born 1956), British actress
- Stuart Monro (born 1947), Scottish geologist and science communicator
- Monro family, a family of noted physicians of London, predominantly associated with Bedlam and various medical societies

== See also ==
- Monroe (disambiguation)
- Munro (disambiguation)
- Munroe (disambiguation)
- Foramina of Monro, the channel that connects the lateral ventricles with the third ventricle of the brain
- Monro Muffler Brake, an automotive service center with over 700 stores
