= 4942 Munroe =

Asteroid

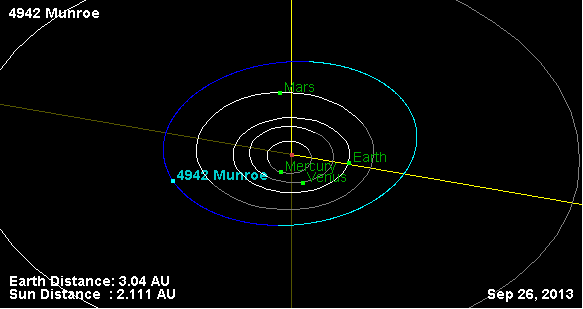
- Orbital diagram of Munroe

Discovery
- Discovered by: H. Debehogne
- Discovery site: La Silla Obs.
- Discovery date: 24 February 1987

Designations
- Named after: Randall Munroe (American cartoonist)
- Alternative designations: 1987 DU_{6} · 1955 MS; 1971 GE · 1990 CB
- Minor planet category: main-belt · (inner)

Orbital characteristics
- Epoch 4 September 2017 (JD 2458000.5)
- Uncertainty parameter 0
- Observation arc: 61.76 yr (22,559 days)
- Aphelion: 2.5000 AU
- Perihelion: 1.9026 AU
- Semi-major axis: 2.2013 AU
- Eccentricity: 0.1357
- Orbital period (sidereal): 3.27 yr (1,193 days)
- Mean anomaly: 9.2509°
- Mean motion: 0° 18^{m} 6.48^{s} / day
- Inclination: 3.8333°
- Longitude of ascending node: 278.09°
- Argument of perihelion: 11.227°

Physical characteristics
- Mean diameter: 3.453±0.139 km
- Geometric albedo: 0.936±0.183
- Spectral type: SMASS = X
- Absolute magnitude (H): 13.5

4942 Munroe, provisional designation 1987 DU_{6}, is an asteroid from the inner regions of the asteroid belt, approximately 3 kilometers in diameter. It was discovered on 24 February 1987, by Belgian astronomer Henri Debehogne at ESO's La Silla Observatory in northern Chile, and later named after American cartoonist and former NASA roboticist Randall Munroe.

== Orbit and classification ==
Munroe orbits the Sun in the inner main-belt at a distance of 1.9–2.5 AU once every 3 years and 3 months (1,194 days). Its orbit has an eccentricity of 0.14 and an inclination of 4° with respect to the ecliptic. It was first identified as 1955 MS at the Leiden Southern Station (Johannesburg-Hartbeespoort) in 1955, extending the body's observation arc by 32 years prior to its official discovery observation.

== Physical characteristics ==
In the SMASS taxonomy, Munroe is characterized as an X-type asteroid. It has an absolute magnitude of 13.5.

=== Diameter and albedo ===
According to the survey carried out by the NEOWISE mission of NASA's Wide-field Infrared Survey Explorer, Munroe measures 3.453 kilometers in diameter and its surface has an exceptionally high albedo of 0.936. On his private blog, Randall Munroe (after whom the asteroid is named) calculates that the asteroid is between 6 and 10 kilometers in diameter, comparable in size to the Chicxulub asteroid.

=== Lightcurves ===
As of 2017, Munroe's rotation period, poles and shape remain unknown.

== Naming ==
In 2013, it was named after Randall Munroe (born 1984), a former NASA roboticist and the author of the webcomic xkcd. The name was chosen by xkcd readers Lewis Hulbert and Jordan Zhu. The official naming citation was published on 22 July 2013 (M.P.C. 84378).
