= Don Munro (Australian footballer) =

Australian rules footballer

Personal information
- Full name: Donald Munro
- Born: 1 June 1891; Tungamah, Victoria
- Died: 9 April 1954 (aged 62)
- Height: 174 cm (5 ft 9 in)

Playing career^{1}
Years	Club	Games (Goals)
1913	Fitzroy	1 (0)
- ^{1} Playing statistics correct to the end of 1913.

Donald Munro (1 June 1891 – 9 April 1954) was an Australian rules footballer who played with Fitzroy in the Victorian Football League (VFL).
