= James Munro (Scottish footballer) =

Scottish footballer

Personal information
- Full name: James B Munro
- Place of birth: Scotland
- Position: Inside right

Senior career*
Years	Team	Apps	(Gls)
1915–1916	Queen's Park	5	(1)
- * Club domestic league appearances and goals

James B. Munro was a Scottish amateur footballer who played in the Scottish League for Queen's Park as an inside right.

== Personal life ==
Munro served as a driver in the Royal Field Artillery during the First World War.

== Career statistics ==
Appearances and goals by club, season and competition
Club	Season	League			Other		Total	
Club	Season	Division	Apps	Goals	Apps	Goals	Apps	Goals
Queen's Park	1915–16	Scottish First Division	1	0	0	0	1	0
Career total			1	0	0	0	1	0
