= Dana Carleton Munro =

American historian (1866–1933)

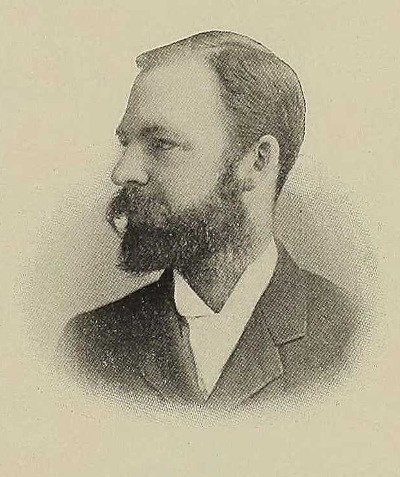
Dana Carleton Munro, circa 1904

Dana Carleton Munro (June 8, 1866 – January 13, 1933) was an American historian, brother of Wilfred Harold Munro, born at Bristol, R.I. He was educated at Brown (A.M., 1890) and in Europe at Strassburg and Freiburg. He taught at Penn (1893–1902), at Wisconsin until 1915, then at Princeton. He was elected as a member to the American Philosophical Society in 1901. Brown gave him the degree of Doctor of humane letters (L.H.D.) in 1912. He edited Translations and Reprints from the Original Sources of History (1894–1902). He was co-author of Mediœval Civilization (1904, 1906) and Essays on the Crusades (1902).

Among the graduate students who studied under Munro were Bernadotte Everly Schmitt, William Ezra Lingelbach, Louis J. Paetow, and Frederick Duncalf.

His son, Dana Gardner Munro, was also a historian.

== Books ==
- A Syllabus of Mediœval History (7th ed., 1913)
- A History of the Middle Ages (1902)
- A Source Book of Roman History (1904)
- The Middle Ages, 395–1272 (1921)
- The Kingdom of the Crusaders (1935)
