= Randall Munroe =

American cartoonist and author (born 1984)

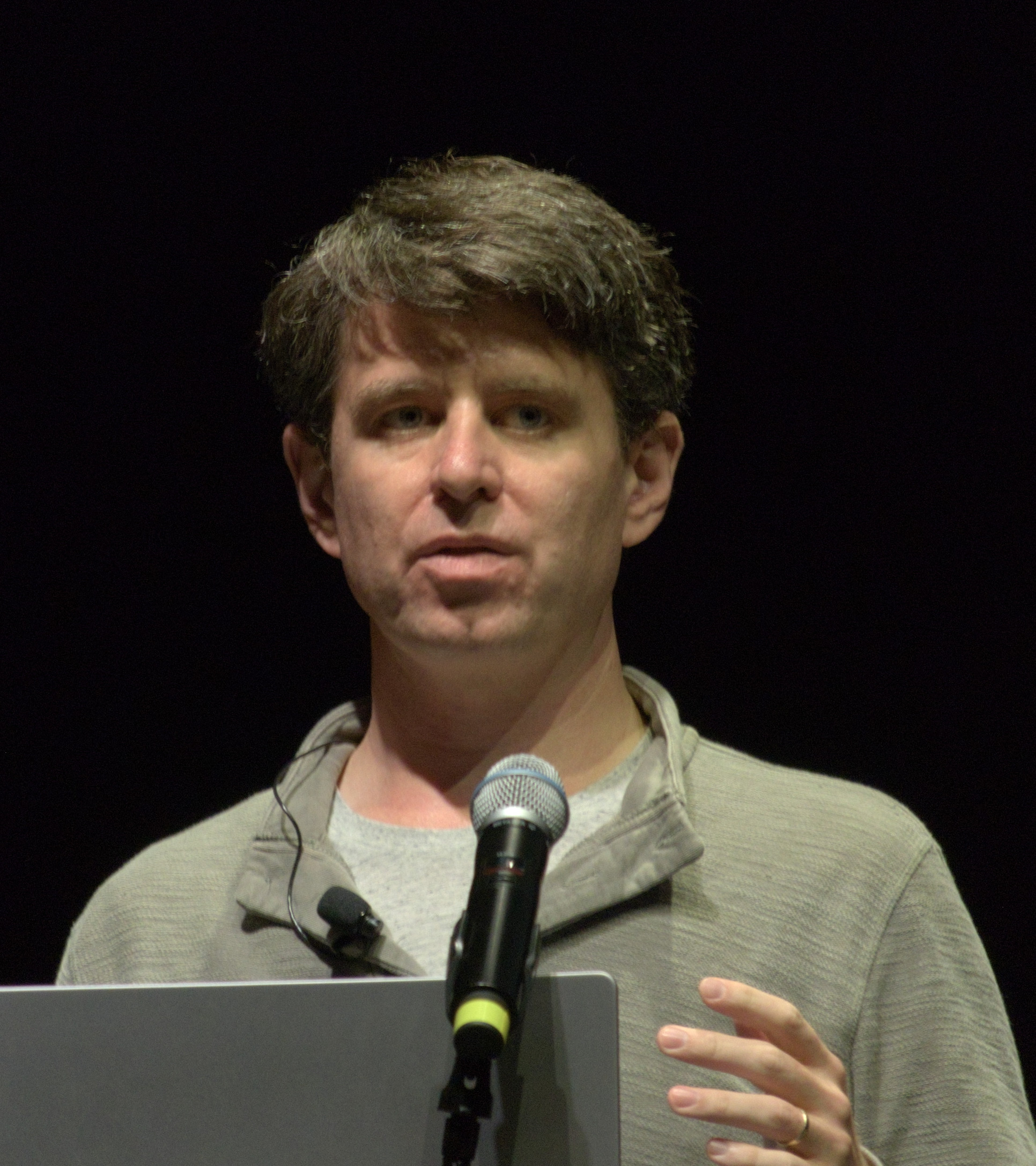
- Munroe in 2023
- Born: Randall Patrick Munroe; October 17, 1984 (age 42); Easton, Pennsylvania, U.S.
- Education: Christopher Newport University (BS)
- Writing career
- Genres: Webcomics, popular science
- Notable works: xkcd; What If?; Thing Explainer; How To; What If? 2
- Website: xkcd.com

Randall Patrick Munroe (born October 17, 1984) is an American cartoonist, author, and engineer best known as the creator of the webcomic xkcd. Munroe has worked full-time on the comic since late 2006. In addition to publishing a book of the webcomic's strips, titled xkcd: Volume 0, he has written four books: What If?, Thing Explainer, How To, and What If? 2.

== Early life and education ==
Munroe was born in Easton, Pennsylvania, and grew up in Virginia. His father worked as an engineer and marketer. He has two younger brothers and was raised as a Quaker. He was a fan of comic strips in newspapers from an early age, starting with Calvin and Hobbes.

After graduating from the Chesterfield County Mathematics and Science High School at Clover Hill in Midlothian, Virginia, he graduated from Christopher Newport University in Newport News, Virginia, in 2006 with a degree in physics.

== Career ==
=== NASA ===
Munroe worked as a contract programmer and roboticist for NASA at the Langley Research Center before and after his graduation with a physics degree.

In late 2006, he left NASA, and moved to Boston to focus on webcomics full time.

=== Webcomic ===
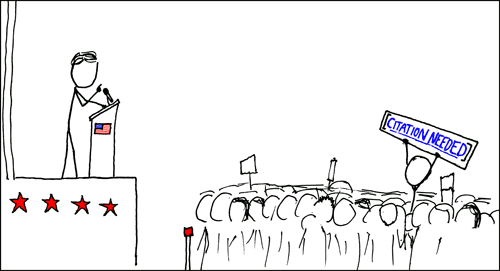
"Wikipedian Protester", published on xkcd.com with all-caps title-text (tooltip): "Semi-protect the Constitution". On Wikipedia, semi-protected pages may not be edited by new or unregistered users. "Citation needed" is a tag added by Wikipedia editors to unsourced statements in articles requesting citations to be added.

Munroe's webcomic, entitled xkcd, is primarily a stick figure comic. Its tagline describes it as "A webcomic of romance, sarcasm, math, and language".

Munroe had originally used xkcd as an instant messaging screenname because he wanted a name without a meaning so he would not eventually grow tired of it. He registered the domain name, but left it idle until he started posting his drawings, the first of which were released in late September 2005. The webcomic quickly became very popular, garnering up to 70 million hits a month by October 2007. In 2008, Munroe said, "I think the comic that's gotten me the most feedback is actually the one about the stoplights".

Munroe now supports himself by the sale of xkcd-related merchandise, primarily thousands of t-shirts a month. He licenses his xkcd creations under the Creative Commons attribution-noncommercial 2.5, stating that it is not just about the free culture movement, but that it also makes good business sense.

In 2009, he published a collection of the comics. He has also toured the lecture circuit, giving speeches at places such as Google's Googleplex in Mountain View, California.

The popularity of the strip among science fiction fans resulted in Munroe being nominated for a Hugo Award for Best Fan Artist in 2011 and again in 2012. In 2014, he won the Hugo Award for Best Graphic Story for the xkcd strip "Time".

=== Other projects ===
Munroe is the creator of the now defunct websites "The Funniest", "The Cutest", and "The Fairest", each of which presents users with two options and asks them to choose one over the other.

In January 2008, Munroe developed an open-source chat moderation script named "Robot9000". Originally developed to moderate one of Munroe's xkcd-related Internet Relay Chat (IRC) channels, the software's algorithm attempts to prevent repetition in IRC channels by temporarily muting users who send messages that are identical to a message that has been sent to the channel before. If a user continues to send unoriginal messages, Robot9000 mutes the user for a longer period, quadrupling for each unoriginal message the user sends to the channel. Shortly after Munroe's blog post about the script went live, 4chan administrator Christopher Poole adapted the script to moderate the site's experimental /r9k/ board. Twitch trialed R9K mode as a beta feature, and eventually introduced it under the name "unique-chat mode".

In October 2008, The New Yorker magazine online published an interview and "Cartoon Off" between Munroe and Farley Katz, in which each cartoonist drew a series of four humorous cartoons.

In early 2010, Munroe ran the xkcd Color Name Survey, in which participants were shown a series of RGB colors and asked to enter a suitable name for each specific color. Munroe wanted to identify colors which were given identical or highly similar names by a large number of survey participants, which would then serve as an approximate list of the most common colors rendered similarly across a range of computer monitors. Over 200,000 people eventually completed the survey, and Munroe published the resulting list of 954 named RGB web colors on the xkcd website. They have since been adopted as conventional color identifiers in various markup and programming languages, including LaTeX, OpenSCAD, and the Python library Matplotlib

In 2015, The New Yorker published "The Space Doctor's Big Idea", an article by Munroe explaining general relativity using only the 1,000 most common English words.

==== What If? ====
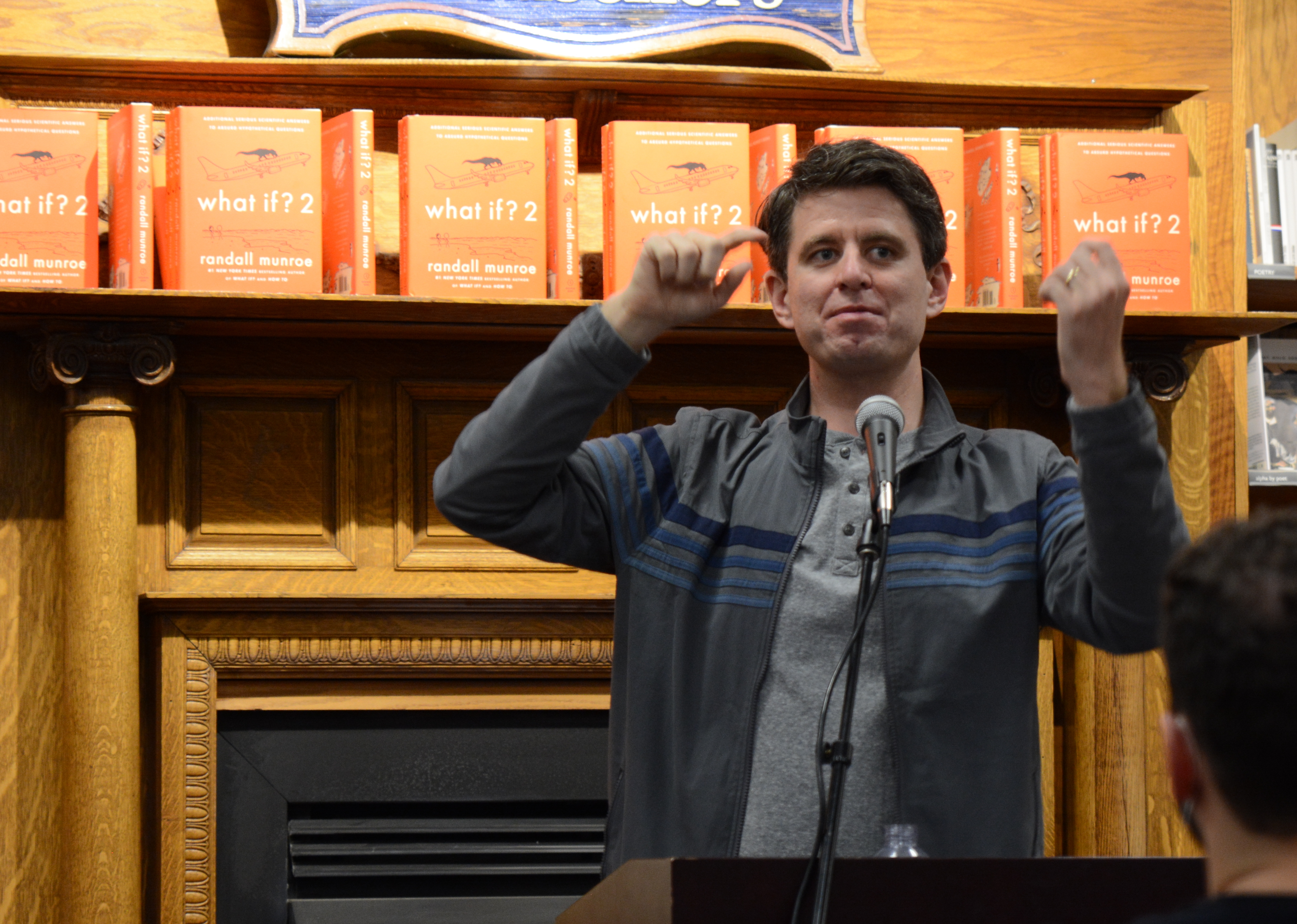
Munroe explaining one of the scenarios from What If? 2 while promoting the book in Norwood, Ohio, in 2022

Munroe has a blog entitled What If?, where he has answered questions sent in by fans of his comics. These questions are usually absurd and related to math or physics, and he explains them using both his knowledge and various academic sources. In 2014, he published a collection of some of the responses, as well as a few new ones and some rejected questions, in a book entitled What If?: Serious Scientific Answers to Absurd Hypothetical Questions. Starting in November 2019, Munroe began writing a monthly column in The New York Times titled Good Question, answering user-submitted questions in the same style as What If.

A sequel, What If? 2: Additional Serious Scientific Answers to Absurd Hypothetical Questions, was published in September 2022 and a 10th anniversary edition was created in 2024.

==== Radioactivity visualization ====
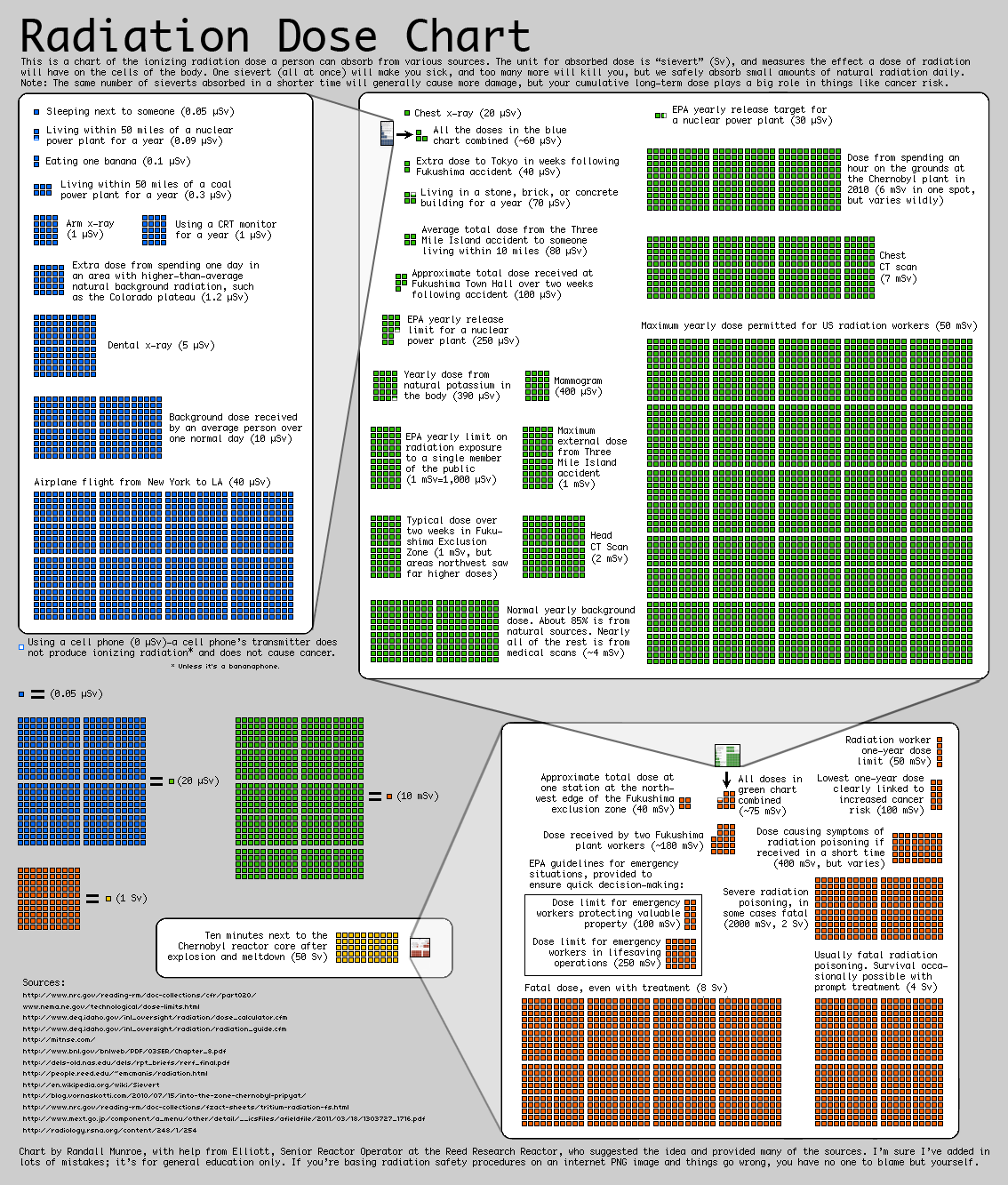
Munroe's 2011 chart on various doses of radioactivity in sieverts, ranging from negligible to lethal

In response to concerns about the radioactivity released by the Fukushima Daiichi nuclear disaster in 2011, and to remedy what he described as "confusing" reporting on radiation levels in the media, Munroe created a radiation chart of comparative radiation exposure levels. The chart was rapidly adopted by print and online journalists in several countries, including being linked to by online writers for The Guardian, and The New York Times. As a result of requests for permission to reprint the chart and to translate it into Japanese, Munroe placed it in the public domain, but requested that his non-expert status be clearly stated in any reprinting.

Munroe published an xkcd-style comic on scientific publishing and open access in Science in October 2013.

==== Thing Explainer ====
Munroe's book Thing Explainer, announced in May 2015 and published later that year, explains concepts using only the 1,000 most common English words. The book's publisher, Houghton Mifflin Harcourt, saw these illustrations as potentially useful for textbooks, and announced in March 2016 that the next editions of their high-school-level chemistry, biology, and physics textbooks will include selected drawings and accompanying text from Thing Explainer.

==== How To ====
In February 2019, Munroe announced his next book, How To, which was released in September of that year. The book deals with everyday problems by using physics to find absurd, and generally extreme, solutions to them.

==== YouTube ====
On August 31, 2023, Munroe created a YouTube channel called xkcd's What If?, where he first uploaded on November 29 of the same year. On the channel Munroe answers questions from the What If? book series, accompanied by xkcd-style animations.

== Influence ==
In September 2013, Munroe announced that a group of xkcd readers had submitted his name as a candidate for the renaming of asteroid (4942) 1987 DU_{6} to 4942 Munroe. The name was accepted by the International Astronomical Union.

== Personal life ==
In October 2010, Munroe's fiancée was diagnosed with stage three breast cancer, even though there had been no prior family history. The emotional effect of her illness was referenced in the comic panel "Emotion", published 18 months later in April 2012. In September 2011, he announced that they had married. In November 2012, Munroe published a comic entitled "Two Years", reflecting on their relationship since his wife's breast cancer diagnosis. He revisited the subject in December 2017 with a comic entitled "Seven Years", in November 2020 in a comic entitled "Ten Years", and again in November 2025 in a comic entitled "Fifteen Years".

His hobbies and interests include kite photography, in which cameras are attached to kites and photographs are then taken of the ground or buildings.

== Books ==
=== By Munroe ===
- xkcd: volume 0. Breadpig. 2009. ISBN 9780615314464.
- What If?: Serious Scientific Answers to Absurd Hypothetical Questions. London: John Murray. 2014. ISBN 9781848549579.
- Thing Explainer. Boston: Houghton Mifflin Harcourt. 2015. ISBN 9780544668256.
- How To: Absurd Scientific Advice for Common Real-World Problems. John Murray. 2019. ISBN 9780525537090.
- What If? 2: Additional Serious Scientific Answers to Absurd Hypothetical Questions. Riverhead Books. 2022. ISBN 9780525537113.

=== With contributions by Munroe ===
- North, Ryan; Matthew, Bennardo; Malki, David (2010). Machine of Death (PDF). Machines of Death LLC. ISBN 9780982167120. Archived (PDF) from the original on January 2, 2023.
