= Jim Munro (journalist) =

British journalist and editor

Jim Munro (born 1962 in England) is a British journalist and newspaper website editor. He is currently Executive Sports Editor of The Sun's online edition and writes for the paper.

He often comments on sport on television and radio broadcasters including Sky News and BBC Radio 5 Live.

== News International ==
Munro began his career at News International in 1990 as a freelance journalist, splitting his time between the sports desks of The Sun and another of Rupert Murdoch's publications, The Sunday Times.

From March 1993, he worked solely for The Sunday Times, initiating the paper's first Sport On TV column. He also wrote the Sports desk's News Focus column, steering it through its transition to On The Record as well as reporting on football and boxing.

In 1995 he was editor of the paper's Rugby World Cup supplement and after editing the Euro 96 supplement for the tournament in England he was appointed The Sunday Times's first Football Editor.

He held this position from May 1996 to November 2006, during which time he edited several more of the paper's specialist supplements while being responsible for between 13 and 17 pages of The Sunday Times sports section on a weekly basis.

In November 2006 he returned to The Sun as Executive Sports Editor of The Sun Online.

== Other work ==
For many years Munro wrote a regular column, "Speaking Personally" in the West Ham United match programme and he has also contributed to several official Football Association publications, including England international and FA Cup final match programmes. He has also contributed to many sport magazines.

In March 2009 he was among the nominees for the SJA's Sports Internet Writer of the Year, one of the annual journalism awards judged by sports editors of the UK national press.

== Sports Journalists' Association ==
Munro was elected to the committee of the Sports Journalists' Association at the April 2007 AGM. Having served on the committee for four years he stood down in April 2011.
