= Munro (disambiguation) =

A Munro is any Scottish mountain with a height over 3,000 ft (910 m).

Munro may also refer to:

== Geography ==
- Munro, Buenos Aires, a neighborhood in the province of Buenos Aires, Argentina
- Hamilton/John C. Munro International Airport, an airport in Hamilton, Ontario, Canada
- Mount Munro, a peak on Cape Barren Island in Tasmania, Australia
- Munro Township, Michigan, United States

== People with the name ==
- Munro (surname), people with the surname Munro
- Clan Munro, a Highland Scottish clan

== Other uses ==
- Munro (film), an Academy-Award-winning animated short film, released in 1961
- Munro Day, holiday celebrated each year on the first Friday in February by Dalhousie University
- Munro Vehicles, Scottish electric vehicle manufacturer
- USCGC Douglas Munro (WHEC-724), a High Endurance Cutter of the US Coast Guard
- USCGC Munro (WMSL-755), Legend-class cutter of the US Coast Guard

== See also ==
- Monro (disambiguation)
- Monroe (disambiguation)
- Munroe (disambiguation)
- Murro
