= Munroe station (MBTA) =

Former train station in Lexington, Massachusetts

Munroe
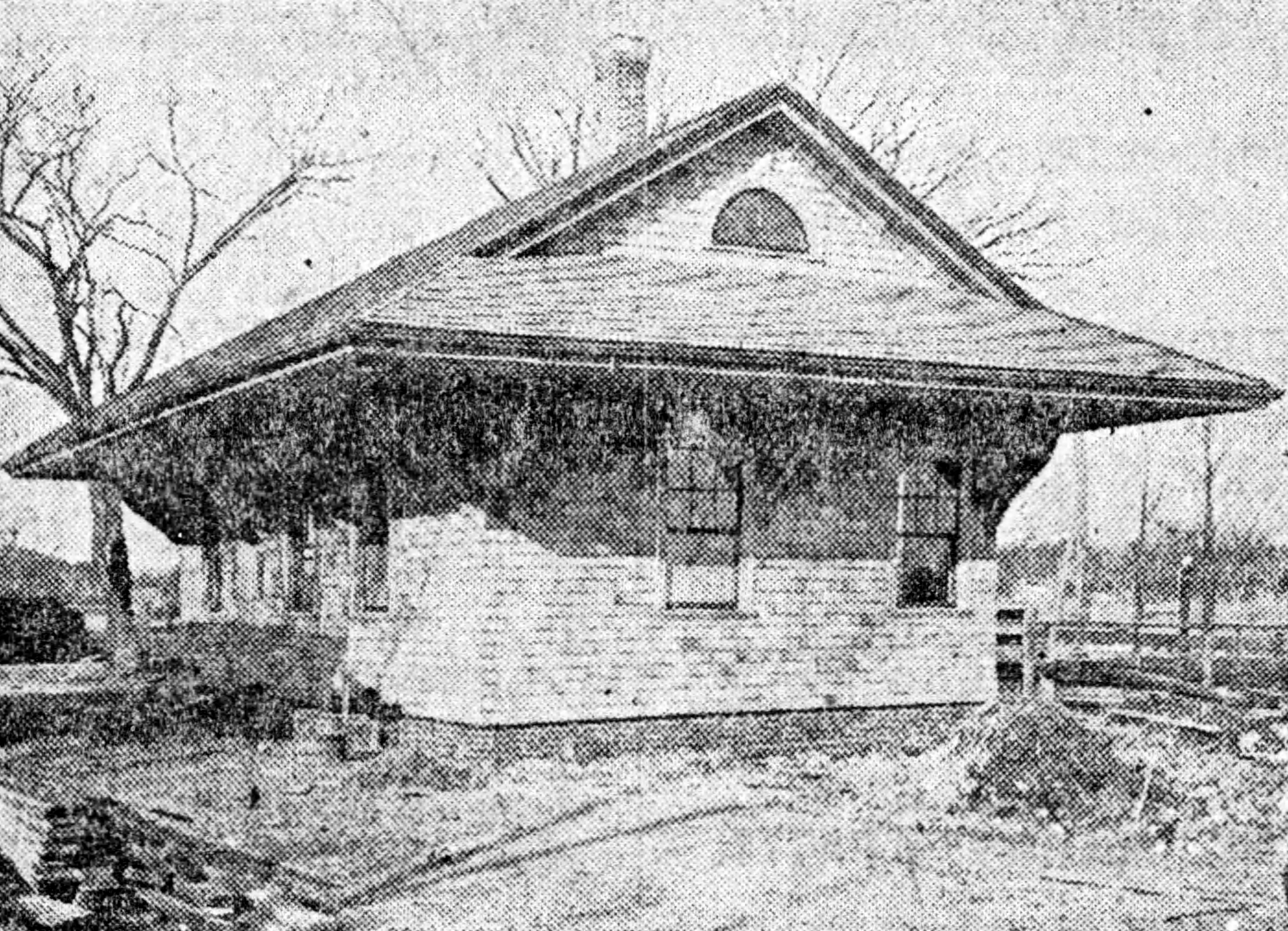
- Munroe station in November 1903

General information
- Location: East of Massachusetts Avenue; Lexington, Massachusetts
- Coordinates: 42.440597°N 71.213024°W
- Line: Lexington Branch

Other information
- Fare zone: 2

History
- Closed: January 10, 1977
- Rebuilt: November 1903

Services
Preceding station	MBTA	Following station
Lexington toward Bedford	Lexington Branch	Pierce's Bridge toward North Station
Location

Munroe station was a commuter rail station in the Munroe Hill neighbourhood of Lexington, Massachusetts, serving the Lexington Branch of the Massachusetts Bay Transportation Authority (MBTA) Commuter Rail system. The depot was located near Munroe Tavern.

== History ==
The small wooden station was replaced with a 20-by-30-foot (6.1 m × 9.1 m) station building in November 1903. It was demolished in 1959, though trains continued to stop. Lexington Branch service ended after a snowstorm blocked the line on January 10, 1977.
