= George Munro, 5th Baron of Foulis =

George Munro, 5th Baron of Foulis was the seventh traditional chief of the Scottish, Clan Munro.

There is no longer any existing contemporary evidence for George's existence; however according to early 18th-century historian Alexander Nisbet there was once proof of his existence. Nisbet, was known as a reliable and careful scholar and usually provided a source if possible. In this case he cites a charter which he says was received by George Munro from the Earl of Sutherland during the reign of King Alexander II of Scotland. Nisbet claims the charter to have read as: Clarissimo & fidelissimo Confanguineo Georgio Munro de Foules. Unfortunately this charter cannot now be traced.

George Munro, 5th Baron of Foulis also appears on the Munro family tree of 1734.

Late 19th century author Alexander Mackenzie also mentions this George Munro. However, he states that George was merely a witness to this charter from William, Earl of Sutherland to the Archdeacon of Moray, dated 1232 -1237 and concludes that this confirms the tradition that Hugh Freskyn who was the grandfather of William, Earl of Sutherland bore the same relation to George Munro of Fowlis. However, Mackenzie only quotes Nisbet's work as a source, which has been mentioned above. Mackenzie gives the same charter reading provided by Nisbet, only the spelling of George differs: Clarissimo & fidelissimo Confanguineo Georgis Munro de Foules.

Mackenzie goes on to say that George received all of his Ross-shire lands in a charter before 1249 during the reign of Alexander II and that George died in 1269, although this is not mentioned by Nisbet.

George was succeeded by his son Robert Munro, 6th Baron of Foulis.

== See also ==
- Chiefs of Clan Munro
