= Robert Munro (rugby union) =

Scotland international rugby union player

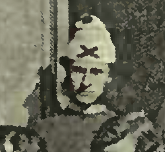
- Born: Robert Munro; 1841 Dull, Perthshire
- Died: 28 August 1913 (aged 71–72)
- University: St Andrew's University

Rugby union career
- Position: Forward
Amateur team(s)
Years	Team	Apps	(Points)
- University of St Andrews RFC
International career
Years	Team	Apps	(Points)
1871	Scotland	1	(0)

Robert Munro (1841–1913) was a rugby union international who represented Scotland in the first international rugby match in 1871.

== Early life ==
Robert Munro was born in Dull, Perthshire in 1841, the son of Alexander M. Munro, a schoolmaster, and Margaret Stewart. He was educated at the University of St Andrews.

== Rugby union career ==
Munro played for the University of St Andrews and such was his prowess he was selected to play in the first international rugby match in 1871 between Scotland and England. This was played on 27 March 1871 at Raeburn Place, Edinburgh and won by Scotland. Later in 1871 he became licensed by the Church of Scotland of St Andrews and began missionary duties.

== Career and personal life ==
Munro became a minister in the Church of Scotland. He was licensed in November 1871 by the St Andrews Presbytery and became a missionary at Struan in Atholl. He was ordained to St Kiarans, Govan, on 16 November 1876. He was translated to Ardnamurchan on 16 April 1879 and on 15 January 1890 translated and admitted. He was demitted on 5 December 1908. Munro died on 28 August 1913.
