= Robert Munro, 6th Baron of Foulis =

Robert Munro, 6th Baron of Foulis was the 8th traditional chief of the Scottish Highland, Clan Munro. Robert is said to have been the son of George Munro, 5th Baron of Foulis who he succeeded in 1269.

There is no longer any contemporary evidence for this Robert Munro's existence however a charter said to have been granted to him after 1309 during the reign of Robert the Bruce is recorded in "Robertson's Index of Charters" which was compiled in 1629 and published in 1798. However, the original charter can no longer be found. Furthermore to Robert Munro, 6th Baron's existence are the Calendar Munro of Fowlis Writs, a series of legal agreements, now preserved in the Register House in Edinburgh, that conclusively prove that the Munro family held land in Ross-shire in the early 14th century and earlier to 1299.

The Wars of Scottish Independence began during Robert Munro's chiefship. The Munros, from early times held their land direct from the crown, but even so, until 1478 they were regarded as vassals of the Earl of Ross. This may explain the "obscure" record of them from these times. William II, Earl of Ross may well have had Munros with him when he was captured at the Battle of Dunbar (1296). It was the Earl's son "Sir Walter the Ros" who fought at the Battle of Bannockburn in 1314 where the Scottish army defeated the English and Robert Munro is said to have fought there with him. General Stewart later included the Munros in the list of Highland clans who fought at Bannockburn. Robert Munro is said to have survived the battle but according to tradition his son George was killed and Robert was therefore later succeeded by his grandson, also called George. Robert's second son, John Munro is said to have later become a guardian of his nephew.

Robert Munro, 6th Baron of Foulis is said to have died in 1323 and was succeeded by his grandson George Munro, 7th Baron of Foulis.

== See also ==
- Chiefs of Clan Munro
