= Monroe (surname) =

Monroe is a surname of Scottish origin, also spelled Munro. Notable people with the surname include:

- A. L. Monroe (born 1931), American union leader
- Alan H. Monroe (1903–1975), professor, creator of Monroe's motivated sequence
- Alexander W. Monroe (1817–1905), American politician and Confederate States Army officer
- Ashley Monroe (born 1986), American country music singer-songwriter
- Bill Monroe (1911–1996), American musician
- Burt Monroe (1930–1994), American ornithologist
- Christopher Monroe (born 1965), American physicist
- Craig Monroe (born 1977), American MLB baseball player
- Darryl Monroe (born 1986), American basketball player in the Israeli Basketball Premier League
- Del Monroe (1932–2009), American film, television and stage actor
- Earl Monroe (born 1944), American Hall of Fame basketball player
- Elizabeth Monroe (1768–1830), First Lady of the United States (1817–1825)
- Greg Monroe (born 1990), American professional basketball player
- Jarius Monroe (born 2000), American football player
- Jessica Monroe (born 1966), Canadian rower
- Jordan Monroe (born 1986), American glamour model
- Kourtnee Monroe, American model
- Kristen Monroe (born 1946), American professor of political science
- Larry Monroe (baseball) (born 1956), American MLB pitcher
- Larry Monroe (radio personality) (1942–2014), American radio host in Austin, Texas
- LoLa Monroe (Fershgenet Melaku, born 1986), Ethiopian-American rapper and actress
- Lucy Monroe (1906–1987), American singer
- Maika Monroe (born 1993), American actress and professional kiteboarder
- Marilyn Monroe (1926–1962), American actress, singer and model
- Mircea Monroe (born 1982), American actress
- Moses Monroe (1842–1895), Irish-born Newfoundland businessman and politician
- Nathan Monroe, American political scientist
- Nicholas Monroe (born 1982), American tennis player
- Nick Monroe (American football) (born 1979), American football player and coach
- Paul Monroe (1869–1947), American educator
- Phil Monroe (1916–1988), American animator and director
- Rachel Monroe (born 1982), American author
- Robert Monroe (1915–1995), American author, founder of the Monroe Institute
- Rod Monroe (1942–2026), American politician
- Rodney Monroe (born 1968), American basketball player
- Rodrick Monroe (born 1976), American football player
- Roger Monroe, Trinidad and Tobago politician
- Sputnik Monroe (Roscoe Monroe Brumbaugh) (1928–2006), American wrestler and civil rights activist
- Tom Monroe (actor) (1919–1993), American actor
- Vaughn Monroe (1911–1973), American baritone singer, trumpeter and big band leader
- Walter Stanley Monroe (1871–1952), Prime Minister of Newfoundland

== Fictional characters ==
- Aaron Monroe (Charlie Wernham) from the BBC soap opera EastEnders
- Alison "Sonny" Monroe (Demi Lovato) from the Disney comedy series Sonny with a Chance (2009–2011)
- Andrew Monroe (Colin Tarrant), police officer in British television series The Bill
- Adam Monroe (David Anders) from the NBC drama series Heroes (2006–2010)
- Dana Monroe (Barbara Smith) from the BBC soap opera EastEnders
- Dr Gabriel Monroe (James Nesbitt) title character in the ITV drama series Monroe (2011–2012)
- Grace Monroe, the main protagonist in Book Three (and a minor antagonist in Book Two) of the animated anthology series Infinity Train (2020)
- Harvey Monroe (Ross Boatman), from the BBC soap opera EastEnders
- Dr Marvin Monroe (voiced by Harry Shearer) of the Fox cartoon The Simpsons (1989–present)
- Mina Monroe (voiced by Kari Wahlgren) of the Warner Bros. cartoon Bunnicula (2016–2018)
- Paul "Jesus" Monroe (Tom Payne) from The Walking Dead
- Sebastian Monroe, President of the Monroe Republic in Revolution
- Mr. Monroe (Jim J. Bullock) of the Nickelodeon comedy Ned's Declassified School Survival Guide (2004–2007)

== Disambiguation pages ==
- Charles Monroe (disambiguation)
- Frank Monroe (disambiguation)
- Jack Monroe (disambiguation)
- James Monroe (disambiguation)
- Jimmy Monroe (disambiguation)
- John Monroe (disambiguation)
- Larry Monroe (disambiguation)
- Mary Monroe (disambiguation)
- Mike Monroe (disambiguation)
- Sebastian Monroe (disambiguation)
- Simon Monroe (disambiguation)
- Thomas Monroe (disambiguation)
- Tom Monroe (disambiguation)
- William Monroe (disambiguation)
- Willie Monroe (disambiguation)

== See also ==
- Clan Munro
