= List of Major League Baseball players (Mi–My) =

The following is a list of Major League Baseball players, retired or active.

== Mi-My ==
Name	Debut	Final game	Position	Teams	Ref
Bart Miadich	September 2, 2001	August 12, 2003	Pitcher	Anaheim Angels	
Dan Miceli	September 9, 1993	September 29, 2006	Pitcher	Pittsburgh Pirates, Detroit Tigers, San Diego Padres, Florida Marlins, Colorado Rockies, Texas Rangers, Cleveland Indians, New York Yankees, Houston Astros, Tampa Bay Devil Rays	
Mickey Micelotta	April 20, 1954	August 2, 1955	Shortstop	Philadelphia Phillies	
Gene Michael	July 15, 1966	September 9, 1975	Shortstop	Pittsburgh Pirates, Los Angeles Dodgers, New York Yankees, Detroit Tigers	
Cass Michaels	August 19, 1943	August 27, 1954	Second baseman	Chicago White Sox, Washington Senators, St. Louis Browns, Philadelphia Athletics	
Jason Michaels	April 6, 2001		Outfielder	Philadelphia Phillies, Cleveland Indians, Pittsburgh Pirates, Houston Astros	
John Michaels	April 16, 1932	September 24, 1932	Pitcher	Boston Red Sox	
Ralph Michaels	April 16, 1924	April 30, 1926	Third baseman	Chicago Cubs	
John Michaelson	August 28, 1921	August 30, 1921	Pitcher	Chicago White Sox	
Chris Michalak	August 22, 1998	September 27, 2006	Pitcher	Arizona Diamondbacks, Toronto Blue Jays, Texas Rangers, Cincinnati Reds	
Ed Mickelson	September 18, 1950	May 12, 1957	First baseman	St. Louis Cardinals, St. Louis Browns, Chicago Cubs	
Glenn Mickens	July 19, 1953	July 30, 1953	Pitcher	Brooklyn Dodgers	
Kam Mickolio	August 20, 2008		Pitcher	Baltimore Orioles, Arizona Diamondbacks	
Jason Middlebrook	September 17, 2001	May 15, 2003	Pitcher	San Diego Padres, New York Mets	
Jim Middleton	April 18, 1917	September 18, 1921	Pitcher	New York Giants, Detroit Tigers	
John Middleton	September 6, 1922	September 21, 1922	Pitcher	Cleveland Indians	
Dick Midkiff	April 24, 1938	September 13, 1938	Pitcher	Boston Red Sox	
Ezra Midkiff	October 5, 1909	August 6, 1913	Third baseman	Cincinnati Reds, New York Highlanders/Yankees	
Gary Mielke	August 19, 1987	September 30, 1990	Pitcher	Texas Rangers	
Doug Mientkiewicz	September 18, 1998		First baseman	Minnesota Twins, Boston Red Sox, New York Mets, Kansas City Royals, New York Yankees, Pittsburgh Pirates, Los Angeles Dodgers	
Ed Mierkowicz	August 31, 1945	April 19, 1950	Outfielder	Detroit Tigers, St. Louis Cardinals	
Matt Mieske	May 3, 1993	September 30, 2000	Outfielder	Milwaukee Brewers, Chicago Cubs, Seattle Mariners, Houston Astros, Arizona Diamondbacks	
Larry Miggins	October 3, 1948	September 28, 1952	Outfielder	St. Louis Cardinals	
John Mihalic	September 18, 1935	September 12, 1937	Second baseman	Washington Senators	
José Mijares	September 13, 2008		Pitcher	Minnesota Twins	
Pete Mikkelsen	April 17, 1964	September 18, 1972	Pitcher	New York Yankees, Pittsburgh Pirates, Chicago Cubs, St. Louis Cardinals, Los Angeles Dodgers	
Hank Miklos	April 23, 1944	May 15, 1944	Pitcher	Chicago Cubs	
Eddie Miksis	June 17, 1944	September 26, 1958	Utility player	Brooklyn Dodgers, Chicago Cubs, St. Louis Cardinals, Baltimore Orioles, Cincinnati Reds	
Bob Milacki	September 18, 1988	September 21, 1996	Pitcher	Baltimore Orioles, Cleveland Indians, Kansas City Royals, Seattle Mariners	
Clyde Milan	August 19, 1907	September 22, 1922	Outfielder	Washington Senators	
Horace Milan	August 29, 1915	September 29, 1917	Outfielder	Washington Senators	
Larry Milbourne	April 6, 1974	September 29, 1984	Utility infielder	Houston Astros, Seattle Mariners, New York Yankees, Minnesota Twins, Cleveland Indians, Philadelphia Phillies	
Mike Milchin	May 14, 1996	September 29, 1996	Pitcher	Minnesota Twins, Baltimore Orioles	
Aaron Miles	September 11, 2003		Second baseman	Chicago White Sox, Colorado Rockies, St. Louis Cardinals, Chicago Cubs, Los Angeles Dodgers	
Carl Miles	June 8, 1940	July 2, 1940	Pitcher	Philadelphia Athletics	
Dee Miles	July 7, 1935	July 5, 1943	Outfielder	Washington Senators, Philadelphia Athletics, Boston Red Sox	
Don Miles	September 9, 1958	September 20, 1958	Outfielder	Los Angeles Dodgers	
Jim Miles	September 7, 1968	September 9, 1969	Pitcher	Washington Senators	
Mike Miley	July 5, 1975	October 3, 1976	Shortstop	California Angels	
Wade Miley	August 20, 2011		Pitcher	Arizona Diamondbacks	
Sam Militello	August 9, 1992	April 22, 1993	Pitcher	New York Yankees	
Johnny Miljus	October 2, 1915	September 25, 1929	Pitcher	Pittsburgh Burghers, Brooklyn Robins, Pittsburgh Pirates, Cleveland Indians	
Félix Millán	June 2, 1966	August 12, 1977	Second baseman	Atlanta Braves, New York Mets	
Kevin Millar	April 11, 1998		First baseman	Florida Marlins, Boston Red Sox, Baltimore Orioles, Toronto Blue Jays	
Frank Millard	May 4, 1890	May 4, 1890	Second baseman	St. Louis Browns	
Lastings Milledge	May 30, 2006		Outfielder	New York Mets, Washington Nationals, Pittsburgh Pirates, Chicago White Sox	
Andrew Miller	August 30, 2006		Pitcher	Detroit Tigers, Florida Marlins, Boston Red Sox	
Bert Miller	July 15, 1897	August 3, 1897	Pitcher	Louisville Colonels	
Bill Miller (OF)	August 23, 1902	August 23, 1902	Outfielder	Pittsburgh Pirates	
Bill Miller (RHP)	October 2, 1937	October 2, 1937	Pitcher	St. Louis Browns	
Bill Miller (LHP)	April 20, 1952	May 8, 1955	Pitcher	New York Yankees, Baltimore Orioles	
Bing Miller	April 16, 1921	September 5, 1936	Outfielder	Washington Senators, Philadelphia Athletics, St. Louis Browns, Boston Red Sox	
Bob Miller (1890s P)	August 30, 1890	July 14, 1891	Pitcher	Rochester Broncos, Washington Statesmen	
Bob Miller (1949–58 P)	September 16, 1949	August 10, 1958	Pitcher	Philadelphia Phillies	
Bob Miller (1953–62 P)	June 25, 1953	September 18, 1962	Pitcher	Detroit Tigers, Cincinnati Reds, New York Mets	
Bob Miller (1957–74 P)	June 25, 1957	September 28, 1974	Pitcher	St. Louis Cardinals, New York Mets, Los Angeles Dodgers, Minnesota Twins, Cleveland Indians, Chicago White Sox, Chicago Cubs, San Diego Padres, Pittsburgh Pirates, Detroit Tigers	
Bruce Miller	August 4, 1973	August 28, 1976	Third baseman	San Francisco Giants	
Charlie Miller (SS)	June 29, 1912	September 18, 1912	Shortstop	St. Louis Browns	
Charlie Miller (PH)	October 2, 1915	October 2, 1915	Pinch hitter	Baltimore Terrapins	
Chuck Miller	September 19, 1913	October 5, 1914	Outfielder	St. Louis Cardinals	
Corky Miller	September 4, 2001		Catcher	Cincinnati Reds, Minnesota Twins, Boston Red Sox, Atlanta Braves, Chicago White Sox	
Cyclone Miller	July 11, 1884	October 14, 1886	Pitcher	Chicago Browns/Pittsburgh Stogies, Providence Grays, Philadelphia Quakers, Philadelphia Athletics (AA)	
Damian Miller	August 10, 1997	September 30, 2007	Catcher	Minnesota Twins, Arizona Diamondbacks, Chicago Cubs, Oakland Athletics, Milwaukee Brewers	
Darrell Miller	August 14, 1984	October 1, 1988	Utility player	California Angels	
Doc Miller	May 4, 1910	September 18, 1914	Outfielder	Chicago Cubs, Boston Doves/Rustlers/Braves, Philadelphia Phillies, Cincinnati Reds	
Doggie Miller	May 1, 1884	September 25, 1896	Catcher	Pittsburgh Alleghenys/Pirates, St. Louis Browns (NL), Louisville Colonels	
Dots Miller	April 16, 1909	September 27, 1921	Utility infielder	Pittsburgh Pirates, St. Louis Cardinals, Philadelphia Phillies	
Dusty Miller (1890s OF)	September 23, 1889	August 20, 1899	Outfielder	Baltimore Orioles (AA), St. Louis Browns (AA), Cincinnati Reds, St. Louis Browns (NL)	
Dusty Miller (1900s OF)	April 17, 1902	July 22, 1902	Outfielder	Chicago Orphans	
Dyar Miller	June 9, 1975	September 2, 1981	Pitcher	Baltimore Orioles, California Angels, Toronto Blue Jays, New York Mets	
Ed Miller (OF)	July 18, 1884	August 2, 1884	Outfielder	Toledo Blue Stockings	
Ed Miller (1B)	September 18, 1912	July 3, 1918	First baseman	St. Louis Browns, Cleveland Indians	
Eddie Miller (IF)	September 9, 1936	September 24, 1950	Shortstop	Cincinnati Reds, Boston Bees/Braves, Philadelphia Phillies, St. Louis Cardinals	
Eddie Miller (OF)	September 5, 1977	September 30, 1984	Outfielder	Texas Rangers, Atlanta Braves, Detroit Tigers, San Diego Padres	
Elmer Miller (OF)	April 26, 1912	September 30, 1922	Outfielder	St. Louis Cardinals, New York Yankees, Boston Red Sox	
Elmer Miller (P)	June 21, 1929	August 22, 1929	Pitcher	Philadelphia Phillies	
Frank Miller	July 12, 1913	July 30, 1923	Pitcher	Chicago White Sox, Pittsburgh Pirates, Atlanta Braves	
Fred Miller	July 8, 1910	August 15, 1910	Pitcher	Brooklyn Superbas	
George Miller	September 6, 1877	July 22, 1884	Catcher	Cincinnati Reds (1876–1880), Cincinnati Red Stockings (AA)	
Hack Miller (OF)	September 22, 1916	May 21, 1925	Outfielder	Brooklyn Robins, Boston Red Sox, Chicago Cubs	
Hack Miller (C)	April 18, 1944	July 5, 1945	Catcher	Detroit Tigers	
Hughie Miller	June 18, 1911	September 18, 1915	First baseman	Philadelphia Phillies, St. Louis Terriers	
Jai Miller	June 22, 2008		Outfielder	Florida Marlins, Kansas City Royals, Oakland Athletics	
Jake Miller (OF)	July 15, 1922	July 17, 1922	Outfielder	Pittsburgh Pirates	
Jake Miller (P)	September 11, 1924	September 24, 1933	Pitcher	Cleveland Indians, Chicago White Sox	
Jason Miller	May 26, 2007	June 4, 2007	Pitcher	Minnesota Twins	
Jim Miller (2B)	September 9, 1901	September 30, 2001	Second baseman	New York Giants	
Jim Miller (P)	September 1, 2008		Pitcher	Baltimore Orioles, Colorado Rockies	
Joe Miller (2B)	June 26, 1872	July 28, 1875	Second baseman	Washington Nationals (NA), Keokuk Westerns, Chicago White Stockings	
Joe Miller (SS)	May 1, 1884	September 15, 1885	Shortstop	Toledo Blue Stockings, Louisville Colonels	
John Miller (P)	September 22, 1962	May 1, 1967	Pitcher	Baltimore Orioles	
John Miller (1B)	September 11, 1966	September 27, 1969	First baseman	New York Yankees, Los Angeles Dodgers	
Justin Miller	April 12, 2002		Pitcher	Toronto Blue Jays, Florida Marlins, San Francisco Giants, Los Angeles Dodgers	
Keith Miller (IF)	June 16, 1987	May 13, 1995	Second baseman	New York Mets, Kansas City Royals	
Keith Miller (OF)	April 23, 1988	October 1, 1989	Outfielder	Philadelphia Phillies	
Kohly Miller	September 16, 1892	October 2, 1897	Second baseman	Washington Senators (NL), St. Louis Browns (NL), Philadelphia Phillies	
Kurt Miller	June 11, 1994	April 27, 1999	Pitcher	Florida Marlins, Chicago Cubs	
Larry Miller	June 21, 1964	September 17, 1966	Pitcher	Los Angeles Dodgers, New York Mets	
Lemmie Miller	May 22, 1984	June 2, 1984	Outfielder	Los Angeles Dodgers	
Matt Miller (LHP)	May 8, 2001	April 4, 2002	Pitcher	Detroit Tigers	
Matt Miller (RHP)	June 27, 2003	June 12, 2007	Pitcher	Colorado Rockies, Cleveland Indians	
Norm Miller	September 11, 1965	September 16, 1974	Outfielder	Houston Astros, Atlanta Braves	
Orlando Miller	July 8, 1994	September 15, 1997	Shortstop	Houston Astros, Detroit Tigers	
Otto Miller (C)	July 16, 1910	September 24, 1922	Catcher	Brooklyn Superbas/Dodgers/Robins	
Otto Miller (3B)	April 17, 1927	April 29, 1932	Third baseman	St. Louis Browns, Boston Red Sox	
Ox Miller	August 7, 1943	September 19, 1947	Pitcher	Washington Senators, St. Louis Browns, Chicago Cubs	
Paul Miller	July 30, 1991	September 28, 1993	Pitcher	Pittsburgh Pirates	
Ralph Miller (RHP)	May 4, 1898	May 26, 1899	Pitcher	Brooklyn Bridegrooms, Baltimore Orioles (NL)	
Ralph Miller (3B)	April 14, 1920	September 30, 1924	Third baseman	Philadelphia Phillies, Washington Senators	
Ralph Miller (LHP)	September 16, 1921	September 16, 1921	Pitcher	Washington Senators	
Randy Miller	September 7, 1977	September 16, 1978	Pitcher	Baltimore Orioles, Montreal Expos	
Ray Miller	April 14, 1917	August 22, 1917	First baseman	Cleveland Indians, Pittsburgh Pirates	
Red Miller	July 13, 1923	July 13, 1923	Pitcher	Philadelphia Phillies	
Rick Miller	September 4, 1971	October 4, 1985	Outfielder	Boston Red Sox, California Angels	
Rod Miller	September 28, 1957	September 28, 1957	Pinch hitter	Brooklyn Dodgers	
Roger Miller	September 8, 1974	September 13, 1974	Pitcher	Milwaukee Brewers	
Ronny Miller	September 10, 1941	September 10, 1941	Pitcher	Washington Senators	
Roscoe Miller	April 25, 1901	July 30, 1904	Pitcher	Detroit Tigers, New York Giants, Pittsburgh Pirates	
Rudy Miller	September 19, 1929	September 20, 1929	Third baseman	Philadelphia Athletics	
Russ Miller	September 24, 1927	September 27, 1928	Pitcher	Philadelphia Phillies	
Stu Miller	August 12, 1952	April 23, 1968	Pitcher	St. Louis Cardinals, Philadelphia Phillies, New York/San Francisco Giants, Baltimore Orioles, Atlanta Braves	
Tom Miller (C)	October 24, 1874	October 29, 1875	Catcher	Philadelphia Athletics (1860–76), St. Louis Brown Stockings	
Tom Miller (PH)	July 29, 1918	May 13, 1919	Pinch hitter	Boston Braves	
Travis Miller	August 25, 1996	June 25, 2002	Pitcher	Minnesota Twins	
Trever Miller	September 4, 1996		Pitcher	Detroit Tigers, Houston Astros, Philadelphia Phillies, Los Angeles Dodgers, Toronto Blue Jays, Tampa Bay Devil Rays/Rays, St. Louis Cardinals, Boston Red Sox	
Wade Miller	July 7, 1999	April 22, 2007	Pitcher	Houston Astros, Boston Red Sox, Chicago Cubs	
Walt Miller	September 20, 1911	October 6, 1911	Pitcher	Brooklyn Dodgers	
Ward Miller	April 14, 1909	July 15, 1917	Outfielder	Pittsburgh Pirates, Cincinnati Reds, Chicago Cubs, St. Louis Terriers, St. Louis Browns	
Warren Miller	July 29, 1909	June 9, 1911	outfielder	Washington Senators	
Whitey Miller	September 15, 1944	September 29, 1944	Pitcher	New York Giants	
Joe Millette	July 16, 1992	June 27, 1993	Shortstop	Philadelphia Phillies	
Ralph Milliard	May 12, 1996	September 27, 1998	Second baseman	Florida Marlins, New York Mets	
Wally Millies	September 23, 1934	May 21, 1941	Catcher	Brooklyn Dodgers, Washington Senators, Philadelphia Phillies	
Billy Milligan	April 30, 1901	May 15, 1904	Pitcher	Philadelphia Athletics, New York Giants	
Jocko Milligan	May 1, 1884	September 26, 1893	Catcher	Philadelphia Athletics (AA), St. Louis Browns (AA), Philadelphia Athletics (1890–91), Washington Senators (NL), Baltimore Orioles (NL), New York Giants	
John Milligan	August 11, 1928	June 23, 1934	Pitcher	Philadelphia Phillies, Washington Senators	
Randy Milligan	September 12, 1987	August 11, 1994	First baseman	New York Mets, Pittsburgh Pirates, Baltimore Orioles, Cleveland Indians, Cincinnati Reds, Montreal Expos	
Bob Milliken	April 22, 1953	July 29, 1954	Pitcher	Brooklyn Dodgers	
Alan Mills	April 14, 1990	October 5, 2001	Pitcher	New York Yankees, Baltimore Orioles, Los Angeles Dodgers	
Art Mills	April 16, 1927	June 11, 1928	Pitcher	Boston Braves	
Bill Mills	May 19, 1944	June 3, 1944	Catcher	Philadelphia Athletics	
Brad Mills (IF)	June 8, 1980	October 2, 1983	Third baseman	Montreal Expos	
Brad Mills (P)	June 18, 2009		Pitcher	Toronto Blue Jays	
Buster Mills	April 18, 1934	June 1, 1946	Outfielder	St. Louis Cardinals, Brooklyn Dodgers, Boston Red Sox, St. Louis Browns, New York Yankees, Cleveland Indians	
Charlie Mills	May 18, 1871	September 28, 1872	Catcher	New York Mutuals	
Dick Mills	September 7, 1970	September 13, 1970	Pitcher	Boston Red Sox	
Everett Mills	May 5, 1871	October 17, 1876	First baseman	Washington Olympics, Baltimore Canaries, Hartford Dark Blues	
Frank Mills	September 22, 1914	September 30, 1914	Catcher	Cleveland Naps	
Jack Mills	July 1, 1911	August 19, 1911	Third baseman	Cleveland Naps	
Lefty Mills	June 10, 1934	August 29, 1940	Pitcher	St. Louis Browns	
Rupert Mills	June 23, 1915	October 3, 1915	First baseman	Newark Peppers	
Willie Mills	July 13, 1901	July 17, 1901	Pitcher	New York Giants	
Kevin Millwood	July 14, 1997		Pitcher	Atlanta Braves, Philadelphia Phillies, Cleveland Indians, Texas Rangers, Baltimore Orioles, Colorado Rockies	
Al Milnar	April 20, 1936	June 10, 1946	Pitcher	Cleveland Indians, St. Louis Browns, Philadelphia Phillies	
Pete Milne	September 15, 1948	May 14, 1950	Outfielder	New York Giants	
Brian Milner	June 23, 1978	June 26, 1978	Catcher	Toronto Blue Jays	
Eddie Milner	September 2, 1980	July 29, 1988	Outfielder	Cincinnati Reds, San Francisco Giants	
John Milner	September 15, 1971	October 3, 1982	Utility player	New York Mets, Pittsburgh Pirates, Montreal Expos	
Tom Milone	September 3, 2011		Pitcher	Washington Nationals	
Mike Milosevich	April 30, 1944	September 15, 1945	Shortstop	New York Yankees	
George Milstead	June 27, 1924	September 14, 1926	Pitcher	Chicago Cubs	
Eric Milton	April 5, 1998		Pitcher	Minnesota Twins, Philadelphia Phillies, Cincinnati Reds, Los Angeles Dodgers	
Larry Milton	May 7, 1903	May 7, 1903	Pitcher	St. Louis Cardinals	
Mike Mimbs	May 6, 1995	May 16, 1997	Pitcher	Philadelphia Phillies	
Cotton Minahan	April 21, 1907	May 15, 1907	Pitcher	Cincinnati Reds	
Rudy Minarcin	April 11, 1955	September 27, 1957	Pitcher	Cincinnati Redlegs, Boston Red Sox	
Don Mincher	April 18, 1960	October 4, 1972	First baseman	Washington Senators/Minnesota Twins, California Angels, Seattle Pilots, Oakland Athletics, Washington Senators/Texas Rangers	
Ed Mincher	May 4, 1871	June 26, 1872	Outfielder	Fort Wayne Kekiongas, Washington Nationals (NA)	
Nate Minchey	September 12, 1993	September 25, 1997	Pitcher	Boston Red Sox, Colorado Rockies	
Ray Miner	September 15, 1921	September 15, 1921	Pitcher	Philadelphia Athletics	
Zach Miner	June 4, 2006		Pitcher	Detroit Tigers	
Craig Minetto	July 4, 1978	May 15, 1981	Pitcher	Oakland Athletics	
Steve Mingori	August 5, 1970	September 2, 1979	Pitcher	Cleveland Indians, Kansas City Royals	
Dan Minnehan	September 20, 1895	September 29, 1895	Third baseman	Louisville Colonels	
Paul Minner	September 12, 1946	June 12, 1956	Pitcher	Brooklyn Dodgers, Chicago Cubs	
Don Minnick	September 23, 1957	September 28, 1957	Pitcher	Washington Senators	
Blas Minor	July 28, 1992	July 14, 1997	Pitcher	Pittsburgh Pirates, New York Mets, Seattle Mariners, Houston Astros	
Damon Minor	September 2, 2000	June 24, 2004	First baseman	San Francisco Giants	
Mike Minor	August 9, 2010		Pitcher	Atlanta Braves	
Ryan Minor	September 13, 1998	October 7, 2001	Third baseman	Baltimore Orioles, Montreal Expos	
Minnie Miñoso	April 19, 1949	October 5, 1980	Outfielder	Cleveland Indians, Chicago White Sox, St. Louis Cardinals, Washington Senators (1961–71)	
Jim Minshall	September 14, 1974	September 11, 1975	Pitcher	Pittsburgh Pirates	
Greg Minton	September 7, 1975	September 29, 1990	Pitcher	San Francisco Giants, Kansas City Royals	
Steve Mintz	May 18, 1995	October 2, 1999	Pitcher	San Francisco Giants, Anaheim Angels	
Gino Minutelli	September 18, 1990	September 9, 1993	Pitcher	Cincinnati Reds, San Francisco Giants	
Paul Mirabella	July 28, 1978	September 27, 1990	Pitcher	Texas Rangers, New York Yankees, Toronto Blue Jays, Baltimore Orioles, Seattle Mariners, Milwaukee Brewers	
Doug Mirabelli	August 27, 1996	September 30, 2007	Catcher	San Francisco Giants, Texas Rangers, Boston Red Sox, San Diego Padres	
Ángel Miranda	June 5, 1993	June 6, 1997	Pitcher	Milwaukee Brewers	
Juan Miranda	September 18, 2008		First baseman	New York Yankees, Arizona Diamondbacks	
Willy Miranda	May 6, 1951	September 7, 1959	Shortstop	Washington Senators, Chicago White Sox, St. Louis Browns, New York Yankees, Baltimore Orioles	
Pat Misch	September 21, 2006		Pitcher	San Francisco Giants, New York Mets	
John Misse	May 26, 1914	October 8, 1914	Utility infielder	St. Louis Terriers	
Mike Misuraca	July 27, 1997	August 11, 1997	Pitcher	Milwaukee Brewers	
Bobby Mitchell (P)	September 6, 1877	August 19, 1882	Pitcher	Cincinnati Reds (1876–1880), Cleveland Blues (NL), St. Louis Brown Stockings (AA)	
Bobby Mitchell (1970s OF)	July 5, 1970	September 28, 1975	Outfielder	New York Yankees, Milwaukee Brewers	
Bobby Mitchell (1980s OF)	September 1, 1980	September 21, 1983	Outfielder	Los Angeles Dodgers, Minnesota Twins	
Charlie Mitchell	August 9, 1984	September 10, 1985	Pitcher	Boston Red Sox	
Clarence Mitchell	June 2, 1911	June 21, 1932	Pitcher	Detroit Tigers, Cincinnati Reds, Brooklyn Robins, Philadelphia Phillies, St. Louis Cardinals, New York Giants	
Craig Mitchell	September 25, 1975	September 25, 1977	Pitcher	Oakland Athletics	
Dale Mitchell	September 15, 1946	September 26, 1956	Outfielder	Cleveland Indians, Brooklyn Dodgers	
Fred Mitchell	April 27, 1901	June 15, 1913	Utility player	Boston Americans, Philadelphia Athletics, Philadelphia Phillies, Brooklyn Superbas	
John Mitchell	September 8, 1986	September 30, 1990	Pitcher	New York Mets, Baltimore Orioles	
Johnny Mitchell	May 21, 1921	September 23, 1925	Shortstop	New York Yankees, Boston Red Sox, Brooklyn Robins	
Keith Mitchell	July 23, 1991	September 27, 1998	Outfielder	Atlanta Braves, Seattle Mariners, Cincinnati Reds, Boston Red Sox	
Kevin Mitchell	September 4, 1984	August 3, 1998	Outfielder	New York Mets, San Diego Padres, San Francisco Giants, Seattle Mariners, Cincinnati Reds, Boston Red Sox, Cleveland Indians, Oakland Athletics	
Larry Mitchell	August 11, 1996	September 2, 1996	Pitcher	Philadelphia Phillies	
Mike Mitchell	April 11, 1907	September 30, 1914	Outfielder	Cincinnati Reds, Chicago Cubs, Pittsburgh Pirates, Washington Senators	
Monroe Mitchell	July 11, 1923	August 29, 1923	Pitcher	Washington Senators	
Paul Mitchell	July 1, 1975	September 21, 1980	Pitcher	Baltimore Orioles, Oakland Athletics, Seattle Mariners, Milwaukee Brewers	
Roy Mitchell	September 10, 1910	July 14, 1919	Pitcher	St. Louis Browns, Chicago White Sox, Cincinnati Reds	
Russ Mitchell	September 8, 2010		Third baseman	Los Angeles Dodgers	
Willie Mitchell	September 22, 1909	May 31, 1919	Pitcher	Cleveland Indians, Detroit Tigers	
Sergio Mitre	July 22, 2003		Pitcher	Chicago Cubs, Florida Marlins, New York Yankees, Milwaukee Brewers	
Ralph Mitterling	July 7, 1916	July 21, 1916	Outfielder	Philadelphia Athletics	
George Mitterwald	September 15, 1966	September 24, 1977	Catcher	Minnesota Twins, Chicago Cubs	
Johnny Mize β	April 16, 1936	September 26, 1953	First baseman	St. Louis Cardinals, New York Giants, New York Yankees	
Vinegar Bend Mizell	April 22, 1952	July 25, 1962	Pitcher	St. Louis Cardinals, Pittsburgh Pirates, New York Mets	
John Mizerock	April 12, 1983	October 1, 1989	Catcher	Houston Astros, Atlanta Braves	
Bill Mizeur	September 30, 1923	September 13, 1924	Pinch hitter	St. Louis Browns	
Dave Mlicki	September 12, 1992	September 23, 2002	Pitcher	Cleveland Indians, New York Mets, Los Angeles Dodgers, Detroit Tigers, Houston Astros	
Kevin Mmahat	September 9, 1989	October 1, 1989	Pitcher	New York Yankees	
Dave Moates	September 21, 1974	October 3, 1976	Outfielder	Texas Rangers	
Garrett Mock	June 8, 2008		Pitcher	Washington Nationals	
Mike Modak	July 4, 1945	September 29, 1945	Pitcher	Cincinnati Reds	
Brian Moehler	September 22, 1996		Pitcher	Detroit Tigers, Cincinnati Reds, Houston Astros, Florida Marlins	
Chad Moeller	June 20, 2000		Catcher	Minnesota Twins, Arizona Diamondbacks, Milwaukee Brewers, Cincinnati Reds, Los Angeles Dodgers, New York Yankees, Baltimore Orioles	
Danny Moeller	September 24, 1907	September 30, 1916	Outfielder	Pittsburgh Pirates, Washington Senators, Cleveland Indians	
Dennis Moeller	July 28, 1992	May 21, 1993	Pitcher	Kansas City Royals, Pittsburgh Pirates	
Joe Moeller	April 12, 1962	September 29, 1971	Pitcher	Los Angeles Dodgers	
Ron Moeller	September 8, 1956	September 25, 1963	Pitcher	Los Angeles Angels, Washington Senators (1961–71)	
Joe Moffet	May 6, 1884	August 10, 1884	First baseman	Toledo Blue Stockings	
Sam Moffet	May 15, 1884	June 22, 1888	Utility player	Cleveland Blues (NL), Indianapolis Hoosiers (NL)	
Randy Moffitt	June 11, 1972	September 19, 1983	Pitcher	San Francisco Giants, Houston Astros, Toronto Blue Jays	
Herb Moford	April 12, 1955	April 29, 1962	Pitcher	St. Louis Cardinals, Detroit Tigers, Boston Red Sox, New York Mets	
George Mogridge	August 17, 1911	July 2, 1927	Pitcher	Chicago White Sox, New York Yankees, Washington Senators, St. Louis Browns, Boston Braves	
John Mohardt	April 15, 1922	April 22, 1922	Outfielder	Detroit Tigers	
George Mohart	April 15, 1920	May 30, 1921	Pitcher	Brooklyn Robins	
Kid Mohler	September 29, 1894	September 30, 1894	Second baseman	Washington Senators (NL)	
Mike Mohler	April 7, 1993	October 7, 2001	Pitcher	Oakland Athletics, St. Louis Cardinals, Cleveland Indians, Arizona Diamondbacks	
Dale Mohorcic	May 31, 1986	October 1, 1990	Pitcher	Texas Rangers, New York Yankees, Montreal Expos	
Dustan Mohr	August 29, 2001	July 8, 2007	Outfielder	Minnesota Twins, San Francisco Giants, Colorado Rockies, Boston Red Sox, Tampa Bay Devil Rays	
Bill Moisan	September 17, 1953	September 25, 1953	Pitcher	Chicago Cubs	
Johnny Mokan	April 15, 1921	October 2, 1927	Outfielder	Pittsburgh Pirates, Philadelphia Phillies	
Fenton Mole	September 1, 1949	September 30, 1949	First baseman	New York Yankees	
Carlton Molesworth	September 14, 1895	September 30, 1895	Pitcher	Washington Senators (NL)	
Bengie Molina	September 21, 1998	October 3, 2010	Catcher	Anaheim Angels/Los Angeles Angels of Anaheim, Toronto Blue Jays, San Francisco Giants, Texas Rangers	
Gabe Molina	May 1, 1999	May 26, 2003	Pitcher	Baltimore Orioles, Atlanta Braves, St. Louis Cardinals	
Gustavo Molina	April 2, 2007		Catcher	Chicago White Sox, Baltimore Orioles, New York Mets, Boston Red Sox, New York Yankees	
Izzy Molina	August 15, 1996	May 6, 2002	Catcher	Oakland Athletics, Baltimore Orioles	
José Molina	September 6, 1999		Catcher	Chicago Cubs, Anaheim Angels/Los Angeles Angels of Anaheim, New York Yankees, Toronto Blue Jays	
Yadier Molina	June 3, 2004		Catcher	St. Louis Cardinals	
Bob Molinaro	September 18, 1975	October 2, 1983	Outfielder	Detroit Tigers, Chicago White Sox, Baltimore Orioles, Chicago Cubs, Philadelphia Phillies	
Paul Molitor β	April 7, 1978	September 27, 1998	Third baseman	Milwaukee Brewers, Toronto Blue Jays, Minnesota Twins	
Fred Mollenkamp	August 29, 1914	August 30, 1914	First baseman	Philadelphia Phillies	
Fritz Mollwitz	September 26, 1913	September 28, 1919	First baseman	Chicago Cubs, Cincinnati Reds, Pittsburgh Pirates, St. Louis Cardinals	
Richie Moloney	September 20, 1970	September 20, 1970	Pitcher	Chicago White Sox	
Vince Molyneaux	July 5, 1917	July 18, 1918	Pitcher	St. Louis Browns, Boston Red Sox	
Blas Monaco	August 18, 1937	May 22, 1946	Second baseman	Cleveland Indians	
Rinty Monahan	August 9, 1953	August 30, 1953	Pitcher	Philadelphia Athletics	
Shane Monahan	July 9, 1998	October 3, 1999	Outfielder	Seattle Mariners	
Carlos Monasterios	April 5, 2010		Pitcher	Los Angeles Dodgers	
Bill Monbouquette	July 18, 1958	September 3, 1968	Pitcher	Boston Red Sox, Detroit Tigers, New York Yankees, San Francisco Giants	
Freddie Moncewicz	June 19, 1928	July 2, 1928	Shortstop	Boston Red Sox	
Alex Monchak	June 22, 1940	September 1, 1940	Shortstop	Philadelphia Phillies	
Rick Monday	September 3, 1966	June 20, 1984	Outfielder	Kansas City/Oakland Athletics, Chicago Cubs, Los Angeles Dodgers	
Raúl Mondesí	July 19, 1993	May 27, 2005	Outfielder	Los Angeles Dodgers, Toronto Blue Jays, New York Yankees, Arizona Diamondbacks, Pittsburgh Pirates, Anaheim Angels, Arizona Diamondbacks	
Don Money	April 10, 1968	September 17, 1983	Third baseman	Philadelphia Phillies, Milwaukee Brewers	
Sid Monge	September 12, 1975	September 30, 1984	Pitcher	California Angels, Cleveland Indians, Philadelphia Phillies, San Diego Padres, Detroit Tigers	
Craig Monroe	July 28, 2001		Outfielder	Texas Rangers, Detroit Tigers, Chicago Cubs, Minnesota Twins, Pittsburgh Pirates	
Ed Monroe	May 29, 1917	April 19, 1918	Pitcher	New York Yankees	
Frank W. Monroe	July 18, 1884	July 20, 1884	Utility player	Indianapolis Hoosiers (AA)	
John Monroe	April 16, 1921	October 1, 1921	Second baseman	New York Giants, Philadelphia Phillies	
Larry Monroe	August 23, 1976	September 30, 1976	Pitcher	Chicago White Sox	
Zach Monroe	June 27, 1958	May 3, 1959	Pitcher	New York Yankees	
Ed Montague	May 14, 1928	September 25, 1932	Shortstop	Cleveland Indians	
John Montague	September 9, 1973	August 28, 1980	Pitcher	Montreal Expos, Philadelphia Phillies, Seattle Mariners, California Angels	
Rafael Montalvo	April 13, 1986	April 13, 1986	Pitcher	Houston Astros	
Lou Montañez	August 5, 2008		Outfielder	Baltimore Orioles, Chicago Cubs	
Willie Montañez	April 12, 1966	October 2, 1982	First baseman	California Angels, Philadelphia Phillies, San Francisco Giants, Atlanta Braves, New York Mets, Texas Rangers, San Diego Padres, Montreal Expos, Pittsburgh Pirates	
Aurelio Monteagudo	September 1, 1963	September 28, 1973	Pitcher	Kansas City Athletics, Houston Astros, Chicago White Sox, Kansas City Royals, California Angels	
René Monteagudo	September 6, 1938	September 30, 1945	Utility player	Washington Senators, Philadelphia Phillies	
John Montefusco	September 3, 1974	May 1, 1986	Pitcher	San Francisco Giants, Atlanta Braves, San Diego Padres, New York Yankees	
Manny Montejo	July 25, 1961	September 15, 1961	Pitcher	Detroit Tigers	
Rich Monteleone	April 15, 1987	July 11, 1996	Pitcher	Seattle Mariners, California Angels, New York Yankees, San Francisco Giants	
Felipe Montemayor	April 14, 1953	June 12, 1955	Outfielder	Pittsburgh Pirates	
Agustín Montero	May 12, 2006	June 28, 2006	Pitcher	Chicago White Sox	
Jesús Montero	September 1, 2011		Catcher	New York Yankees	
Miguel Montero	September 6, 2006		Catcher	Arizona Diamondbacks	
Al Montgomery	June 20, 1941	September 17, 1941	Catcher	Boston Braves	
Bob Montgomery	September 6, 1970	September 9, 1979	Catcher	Boston Red Sox	
Jeff Montgomery	August 1, 1987	October 2, 1999	Pitcher	Cincinnati Reds, Kansas City Royals	
Monty Montgomery	September 14, 1971	September 30, 1972	Pitcher	Kansas City Royals	
Ray Montgomery	July 3, 1996	June 16, 1998	Outfielder	Houston Astros	
Steve Montgomery	April 3, 1996	July 17, 2000	Pitcher	Oakland Athletics, Philadelphia Phillies, San Diego Padres	
Charlie Montoyo	September 7, 1993	September 29, 1993	Second baseman	Montreal Expos	
Al Montreuil	September 1, 1972	October 3, 1972	Second baseman	Chicago Cubs	
Luke Montz	September 4, 2008		Catcher	Washington Nationals	
Ramón Monzant	July 2, 1954	April 25, 1960	Pitcher	New York/San Francisco Giants	
Dan Monzon	April 25, 1972	September 30, 1973	Second baseman	Minnesota Twins	
Joe Moock	September 1, 1967	October 1, 1967	Third baseman	New York Mets	
Eric Moody	August 3, 1997	September 18, 1997	Pitcher	Texas Rangers	
George Moolic	May 1, 1886	September 7, 1886	Catcher	Chicago Cubs	
Leo Moon	July 9, 1932	July 9, 1932	Pitcher	Cleveland Indians	
Wally Moon	April 13, 1954	September 12, 1965	Outfielder	St. Louis Cardinals, Los Angeles Dodgers	
Jim Mooney	August 14, 1931	August 27, 1934	Pitcher	New York Giants, St. Louis Cardinals	
Bill Mooneyham	April 19, 1986	September 30, 1986	Pitcher	Oakland Athletics	
Adam Moore	September 17, 2009		Catcher	Seattle Mariners	
Al Moore	September 27, 1925	September 24, 1926	Outfielder	New York Giants	
Anse Moore	April 17, 1946	September 29, 1946	Outfielder	Detroit Tigers	
Archie Moore	April 20, 1964	September 28, 1965	Outfielder	New York Yankees	
Balor Moore	May 21, 1970	August 6, 1980	Pitcher	Montreal Expos, California Angels, Toronto Blue Jays	
Barry Moore	May 25, 1965	October 1, 1970	Pitcher	Washington Senators (1961–71), Cleveland Indians	
Bill Moore (P)	April 15, 1925	April 15, 1925	Pitcher	Detroit Tigers	
Bill Moore (C)	September 7, 1926	October 1, 1927	Catcher	Boston Red Sox	
Bill Moore (1B)	July 19, 1986	July 25, 1986	First baseman	Montreal Expos	
Bobby Moore (P)	September 11, 1985	October 6, 1985	Pitcher	San Francisco Giants	
Bobby Moore (OF)	September 5, 1991	October 6, 1991	Outfielder	Kansas City Royals	
Brad Moore	June 14, 1988	April 25, 1990	Pitcher	Philadelphia Phillies	
Carlos Moore	May 4, 1930	May 30, 1930	Pitcher	Washington Senators	
Charley Moore	April 16, 1912	May 13, 1912	Utility infielder	Chicago Cubs	
Charlie Moore	September 8, 1973	October 4, 1987	Catcher	Milwaukee Brewers, Toronto Blue Jays	
Cy Moore	June 7, 1929	September 24, 1934	Pitcher	Brooklyn Robins/Dodgers, Philadelphia Phillies	
Dee Moore	September 12, 1936	September 29, 1946	Catcher	Cincinnati Reds, Brooklyn Dodgers, Philadelphia Phillies	
Donnie Moore	September 14, 1975	August 7, 1988	Pitcher	Chicago Cubs, St. Louis Cardinals, Milwaukee Brewers, Atlanta Braves, California Angels	
Earl Moore	April 25, 1901	October 10, 1914	Pitcher	Cleveland Blues (AL)/Bronchos/Naps, New York Highlanders, Philadelphia Phillies, Buffalo Buffeds	
Eddie Moore	September 25, 1923	July 11, 1934	Second baseman	Pittsburgh Pirates, Boston Braves, Brooklyn Robins, New York Giants, Chicago Cubs	
Euel Moore	July 8, 1934	July 26, 1936	Pitcher	Philadelphia Phillies, New York Giants	
Ferdie Moore	October 2, 1914	October 3, 1914	First baseman	Philadelphia Athletics	
Frank Moore	June 14, 1905	June 14, 1905	Pitcher	Pittsburgh Pirates	
Gary Moore	May 3, 1970	May 23, 1970	Outfielder	Los Angeles Dodgers	
Gene Moore (P)	September 28, 1909	September 2, 1912	Outfielder	Pittsburgh Pirates, Cincinnati Reds	
Gene Moore (OF)	September 19, 1931	September 30, 1945	Outfielder	Cincinnati Reds, St. Louis Cardinals, Boston Bees, Brooklyn Dodgers, Boston Braves, Washington Senators	
Henry Moore	April 17, 1884	October 19, 1884	Outfielder	Washington Nationals (UA)	
Jackie Moore	April 18, 1965	September 20, 1965	Catcher	Detroit Tigers	
Jeremy Moore	September 2, 2011		Outfielder	Los Angeles Angels of Anaheim	
Jerry Moore	April 17, 1884	May 28, 1885	Catcher	Altoona Mountain City, Cleveland Blues (NL), Detroit Wolverines	
Jim Moore	September 21, 1928	April 23, 1932	Pitcher	Cleveland Indians, Chicago White Sox	
Jimmy Moore	April 17, 1930	September 27, 1931	Outfielder	Chicago White Sox, Philadelphia Athletics	
Johnny Moore	September 15, 1928	September 26, 1945	Outfielder	Chicago Cubs, Cincinnati Reds, Philadelphia Phillies	
Jo-Jo Moore	September 17, 1930	September 21, 1941	Outfielder	New York Giants	
Junior Moore	August 2, 1976	September 25, 1980	Third baseman	Atlanta Braves, Chicago White Sox	
Kelvin Moore	August 28, 1981	June 2, 1983	First baseman	Oakland Athletics	
Kerwin Moore	August 30, 1996	September 29, 1996	Outfielder	Oakland Athletics	
Marcus Moore	July 9, 1993	June 5, 1996	Pitcher	Colorado Rockies, Cincinnati Reds	
Matt Moore	September 14, 2011		Pitcher	Tampa Bay Rays	
Mike Moore	April 11, 1982	August 31, 1995	Pitcher	Seattle Mariners, Oakland Athletics, Detroit Tigers	
Molly Moore	June 30, 1875	October 9, 1875	Shortstop	Brooklyn Atlantics	
Randy Moore	April 12, 1927	September 7, 1937	Outfielder	Chicago White Sox, Boston Braves, Brooklyn Dodgers, St. Louis Cardinals	
Ray Moore	August 1, 1952	September 6, 1963	Pitcher	Brooklyn Dodgers, Baltimore Orioles, Chicago White Sox, Washington Senators/Minnesota Twins	
Roy Moore	April 15, 1920	May 8, 1923	Pitcher	Philadelphia Athletics, Detroit Tigers	
Scott Moore	September 4, 2006		Utility infielder	Chicago Cubs, Baltimore Orioles	
Scrappy Moore	June 21, 1917	July 5, 1917	Third baseman	St. Louis Browns	
Terry Moore	April 16, 1935	September 24, 1948	Outfielder	St. Louis Cardinals	
Tommy Moore	September 15, 1972	May 15, 1977	Pitcher	New York Mets, St. Louis Cardinals, Texas Rangers, Seattle Mariners	
Trey Moore	April 5, 1998	July 15, 2001	Pitcher	Montreal Expos, Atlanta Braves	
Whitey Moore	September 27, 1936	September 27, 1942	Pitcher	Cincinnati Reds, St. Louis Cardinals	
Wilcy Moore	April 14, 1927	September 28, 1933	Pitcher	New York Yankees, Boston Red Sox	
Bob Moorhead	April 11, 1962	September 20, 1965	Pitcher	New York Mets	
Bob Moose	September 19, 1967	September 25, 1976	Pitcher	Pittsburgh Pirates	
Jake Mooty	September 9, 1936	September 29, 1944	Pitcher	Cincinnati Reds, Chicago Cubs, Detroit Tigers	
Andrés Mora	April 13, 1976	May 6, 1980	Outfielder	Baltimore Orioles, Cleveland Indians	
Melvin Mora	May 30, 1999		Third baseman	New York Mets, Baltimore Orioles, Colorado Rockies, Arizona Diamondbacks	
David Moraga	June 11, 2000	September 28, 2000	Pitcher	Montreal Expos, Colorado Rockies	
Franklin Morales	August 18, 2007		Pitcher	Colorado Rockies, Boston Red Sox	
Jerry Morales	September 5, 1969	September 28, 1983	Outfielder	San Diego Padres, Chicago Cubs, St. Louis Cardinals, Detroit Tigers, New York Mets	
José Morales (DH)	August 13, 1973	June 4, 1984	Designated hitter	Oakland Athletics, Montreal Expos, Minnesota Twins, Baltimore Orioles, Los Angeles Dodgers	
José Morales (C)	September 8, 2007		Catcher	Minnesota Twins, Colorado Rockies	
Kendry Morales	May 23, 2006		First baseman	Los Angeles Angels of Anaheim	
Rich Morales	August 8, 1967	October 2, 1974	Utility infielder	Chicago White Sox, San Diego Padres	
Willie Morales	April 9, 2000	September 6, 2000	Catcher	Baltimore Orioles	
Al Moran	April 9, 1963	May 10, 1964	Shortstop	New York Mets	
Bill Moran (C)	May 7, 1892	July 5, 1895	Catcher	St. Louis Browns (NL), Chicago Colts	
Bill Moran (P)	April 12, 1974	August 3, 1974	Pitcher	Chicago White Sox	
Billy Moran	April 15, 1958	September 28, 1965	Second baseman	Cleveland Indians, Los Angeles Angels	
Charles Moran	April 29, 1903	June 19, 1905	Shortstop	Washington Senators, St. Louis Browns	
Charley Moran	September 9, 1903	October 4, 1908	Catcher	St. Louis Cardinals	
Harry Moran	June 23, 1912	October 3, 1915	Pitcher	Detroit Tigers, Buffalo Buffeds, Newark Peppers	
Herbie Moran	April 16, 1908	October 7, 1915	Outfielder	Philadelphia Athletics, Boston Doves, Brooklyn Dodgers/Superbas, Cincinnati Reds, Boston Braves	
Hiker Moran	September 29, 1938	October 1, 1939	Pitcher	Boston Braves	
Pat Moran	May 15, 1901	June 5, 1914	Catcher	Boston Beaneaters, Chicago Cubs, Philadelphia Phillies	
Roy Moran	September 3, 1912	September 15, 1912	Outfielder	Washington Senators	
Sam Moran	August 28, 1895	September 28, 1895	Pitcher	Pittsburgh Pirates	
Mickey Morandini	September 1, 1990	October 1, 2000	Second baseman	Philadelphia Phillies, Chicago Cubs, Toronto Blue Jays	
José Morban	April 6, 2003	September 28, 2003	Utility infielder	Baltimore Orioles	
Mike Mordecai	May 8, 1994	September 21, 2005	Utility infielder	Atlanta Braves, Montreal Expos, Florida Marlins	
Forrest More	April 15, 1909	September 8, 1909	Pitcher	St. Louis Cardinals, Boston Doves	
Ray Morehart	August 9, 1924	September 29, 1927	Second baseman	Chicago White Sox, New York Yankees	
Dave Morehead	April 13, 1963	September 29, 1970	Pitcher	Boston Red Sox, Kansas City Royals	
Seth Morehead	April 27, 1957	September 15, 1961	Pitcher	Philadelphia Phillies, Chicago Cubs, Milwaukee Braves	
Danny Morejón	July 11, 1958	August 3, 1958	Outfielder	Cincinnati Redlegs	
Brent Morel	September 7, 2010		Third baseman	Chicago White Sox	
Ramón Morel	July 6, 1995	September 27, 1997	Pitcher	Pittsburgh Pirates, Chicago Cubs	
Keith Moreland	October 1, 1978	September 24, 1989	Outfielder	Philadelphia Phillies, Chicago Cubs, San Diego Padres, Detroit Tigers, Baltimore Orioles	
Mitch Moreland	July 29, 2010		First baseman	Texas Rangers	
Harry Morelock	August 21, 1891	August 9, 1892	Shortstop	Philadelphia Phillies	
Lew Moren	September 21, 1903	September 23, 1910	Pitcher	Pittsburgh Pirates, Philadelphia Phillies	
Ángel Moreno	August 15, 1981	June 25, 1982	Pitcher	California Angels	
Edwin Moreno	April 7, 2009		Pitcher	San Diego Padres	
José Moreno	May 24, 1980	May 11, 1982	Utility player	New York Mets, San Diego Padres, California Angels	
Juan Moreno	May 17, 2001	April 16, 2002	Pitcher	Texas Rangers, San Diego Padres	
Julio Moreno	September 8, 1950	June 26, 1953	Pitcher	Washington Senators	
Omar Moreno	September 6, 1975	October 5, 1986	Outfielder	Pittsburgh Pirates, Houston Astros, New York Yankees, Kansas City Royals, Atlanta Braves	
Orber Moreno	May 25, 1999	July 22, 2004	Pitcher	Kansas City Royals, New York Mets	
Roger Moret	September 13, 1970	June 16, 1978	Pitcher	Boston Red Sox, Atlanta Braves, Texas Rangers	
Dave Morey	July 4, 1913	July 17, 1913	Pitcher	Philadelphia Athletics	
Bill Morgan (1882–84)	August 17, 1882	August 21, 1884	Utility player	Pittsburgh Alleghenys, Richmond Virginians, Baltimore Monumentals	
Bill Morgan (1883–84)	August 6, 1883	July 23, 1884	Utility player	Pittsburgh Alleghenys, Washington Nationals (AA)	
Bobby Morgan	April 18, 1950	April 20, 1958	Utility infielder	Brooklyn Dodgers, Philadelphia Phillies, St. Louis Cardinals, Chicago Cubs	
Chet Morgan	April 19, 1935	September 29, 1938	Outfielder	Detroit Tigers	
Cy Morgan (1900s P)	September 18, 1903	September 1, 1913	Pitcher	St. Louis Browns, Boston Americans/Red Sox, Philadelphia Athletics, Cincinnati Reds	
Cy Morgan (1920s P)	June 8, 1921	May 1, 1922	Pitcher	Boston Braves	
Ed Morgan	April 11, 1928	September 30, 1934	First baseman	Cleveland Indians, Boston Red Sox	
Eddie Morgan	April 14, 1936	July 23, 1937	Outfielder	St. Louis Cardinals, Brooklyn Dodgers	
Joe Morgan (3B)	April 14, 1959	October 3, 1964	Third baseman	Milwaukee Braves, Kansas City Athletics, Philadelphia Phillies, Cleveland Indians, St. Louis Cardinals	
Joe Morgan (2B) β	September 21, 1963	September 30, 1984	Second baseman	Houston Colt .45s/Astros, Cincinnati Reds, San Francisco Giants, Philadelphia Phillies, Oakland Athletics	
Kevin Morgan	June 15, 1997	June 15, 1997	Third baseman	New York Mets	
Mike Morgan	June 11, 1978	September 2, 2002	Pitcher	Oakland Athletics, New York Yankees, Seattle Mariners, Baltimore Orioles, Los Angeles Dodgers, Chicago Cubs, St. Louis Cardinals, Cincinnati Reds, Minnesota Twins, Texas Rangers, Arizona Diamondbacks	
Nyjer Morgan	September 1, 2007		Outfielder	Pittsburgh Pirates, Washington Nationals, Milwaukee Brewers	
Pidgey Morgan	May 4, 1875	June 22, 1878	Outfielder	St. Louis Red Stockings, Milwaukee Grays	
Ray Morgan	August 7, 1911	September 1, 1918	Second baseman	Washington Senators	
Red Morgan	June 20, 1906	October 6, 1906	Third baseman	Boston Americans	
Tom Morgan	April 20, 1951	June 8, 1963	Pitcher	New York Yankees, Kansas City Athletics, Detroit Tigers, Washington Senators, Los Angeles Angels	
Vern Morgan	August 10, 1954	May 1, 1955	Third baseman	Chicago Cubs	
Moe Morhardt	September 7, 1961	May 19, 1962	First baseman	Chicago Cubs	
Bill Moriarty	April 29, 1909	May 3, 1909	Shortstop	Cincinnati Reds	
Ed Moriarty	June 21, 1935	May 12, 1936	Second baseman	Boston Braves	
Gene Moriarty	June 18, 1884	October 15, 1892	Outfielder	Boston Beaneaters, Indianapolis Hoosiers (AA), Detroit Wolverines, St. Louis Browns (NL)	
George Moriarty	September 27, 1903	May 4, 1916	Third baseman	Chicago Cubs, New York Highlanders, Detroit Tigers, Chicago White Sox	
Mike Moriarty	April 11, 2002	May 4, 2002	Shortstop	Baltimore Orioles	
Juan Morillo	September 24, 2006		Pitcher	Colorado Rockies, Minnesota Twins	
John Morlan	July 20, 1973	September 29, 1974	Pitcher	Pittsburgh Pirates	
Bill Morley	September 8, 1913	September 9, 1913	Second baseman	Washington Senators	
Alvin Morman	April 2, 1996	October 2, 1999	Pitcher	Houston Astros, Cleveland Indians, San Francisco Giants, Kansas City Royals	
Russ Morman	August 3, 1986	September 27, 1997	First baseman	Chicago White Sox, Kansas City Royals, Florida Marlins	
Justin Morneau	June 10, 2003		First baseman	Minnesota Twins	
Dan Morogiello	May 20, 1983	September 22, 1983	Pitcher	Baltimore Orioles	
Jim Moroney	April 24, 1906	July 23, 1912	Pitcher	Boston Beaneaters, Philadelphia Phillies, Chicago Cubs	
Jeff Moronko	September 1, 1984	July 19, 1987	Third baseman	Cleveland Indians, New York Yankees	
Bill Morrell	April 20, 1926	August 5, 1931	Pitcher	Washington Senators, New York Giants	
John Morrill	April 24, 1876	July 8, 1890	First baseman	Boston Red Caps/Beaneaters, Washington Nationals (1886–1889), Boston Reds (1890–91)	
Danny Morris	September 10, 1961	June 29, 1969	Pitcher	Minnesota Twins	
Doyt Morris	June 6, 1937	September 22, 1937	Outfielder	Philadelphia Athletics	
Ed Morris (1880s P)	May 1, 1884	October 1, 1890	Pitcher	Columbus Buckeyes, Pittsburgh Alleghenys, Pittsburgh Burghers	
Ed Morris (1920s P)	August 5, 1922	September 21, 1931	Pitcher	Chicago Cubs, Boston Red Sox	
Hal Morris	July 29, 1988	October 1, 2000	First baseman	New York Yankees, Cincinnati Reds, Kansas City Royals, Detroit Tigers	
Jack Morris	July 26, 1977	August 7, 1994	Pitcher	Detroit Tigers, Minnesota Twins, Toronto Blue Jays, Cleveland Indians	
James Morris	September 11, 1884	September 11, 1884	Utility player	Baltimore Monumentals	
Jim Morris	September 18, 1999	May 9, 2000	Pitcher	Tampa Bay Devil Rays	
John Morris (P)	July 19, 1966	October 2, 1974	Pitcher	Philadelphia Phillies, Baltimore Orioles, Seattle Pilots/Milwaukee Brewers, San Francisco Giants	
John Morris (OF)	August 5, 1986	August 5, 1992	Outfielder	St. Louis Cardinals, Philadelphia Phillies, California Angels	
Matt Morris	April 4, 1997	April 26, 2008	Pitcher	St. Louis Cardinals, San Francisco Giants, Pittsburgh Pirates	
Peter Morris	May 14, 1884	May 14, 1884	Shortstop	Washington Nationals (UA)	
Walter Morris	August 31, 1908	September 26, 1908	Shortstop	St. Louis Cardinals	
Warren Morris	April 5, 1999	September 28, 2003	Second baseman	Pittsburgh Pirates, Minnesota Twins, Detroit Tigers	
Bill Morrisette	September 18, 1915	September 23, 1920	Pitcher	Philadelphia Athletics, Detroit Tigers	
Guy Morrison	August 31, 1927	April 27, 1928	Pitcher	Boston Braves	
Hank Morrison	May 28, 1887	July 28, 1887	Pitcher	Indianapolis Hoosiers (NL)	
Jim Morrison	September 18, 1977	September 28, 1988	Third baseman	Philadelphia Phillies, Chicago White Sox, Pittsburgh Pirates, Detroit Tigers, Atlanta Braves	
Johnny Morrison	September 28, 1920	June 19, 1930	Pitcher	Pittsburgh Pirates, Brooklyn Robins	
Jon Morrison	August 1, 1884	May 2, 1887	Outfielder	Indianapolis Hoosiers (AA), New York Metropolitans	
Logan Morrison	July 27, 2010		Outfielder	Florida Marlins	
Mike Morrison	April 19, 1887	September 21, 1890	Pitcher	Cleveland Blues, Syracuse Stars (AA), Baltimore Orioles (AA)	
Phil Morrison	September 30, 1921	September 30, 1921	Pitcher	Pittsburgh Pirates	
Tom Morrison	September 18, 1895	May 10, 1896	Third baseman	Louisville Colonels	
Frank Morrissey	July 13, 1901	October 4, 1902	Pitcher	Boston Americans, Chicago Orphans	
Jack Morrissey	September 18, 1902	July 6, 1903	Second baseman	Cincinnati Reds	
John Morrissey	May 2, 1881	May 14, 1881	Third baseman	Buffalo Bisons (NL)	
Jo-Jo Morrissey	April 12, 1932	September 23, 1936	Utility infielder	Cincinnati Reds, Chicago White Sox	
Tom Morrissey	July 12, 1882	October 12, 1884	Third baseman	Detroit Wolverines, Milwaukee Brewers (UA)	
Brandon Morrow	April 3, 2007		Pitcher	Seattle Mariners, Toronto Blue Jays	
Bud Morse	September 14, 1929	September 29, 1929	Second baseman	Philadelphia Athletics	
Hap Morse	April 18, 1911	April 23, 1911	Shortstop	St. Louis Cardinals	
Michael Morse	May 31, 2005		Outfielder	Seattle Mariners, Washington Nationals	
Clayton Mortensen	June 29, 2009		Pitcher	St. Louis Cardinals, Oakland Athletics, Colorado Rockies	
Bubba Morton	April 19, 1961	September 28, 1969	Outfielder	Detroit Tigers, Milwaukee Braves, California Angels	
Carl Morton	April 11, 1969	August 21, 1976	Pitcher	Montreal Expos, Atlanta Braves	
Charlie Morton (OF)	May 2, 1882	June 23, 1885	Utility player	Pittsburgh Alleghenys, St. Louis Browns (AA), Toledo Blue Stockings, Detroit Wolverines	
Charlie Morton (P)	June 14, 2008		Pitcher	Atlanta Braves, Pittsburgh Pirates	
Colt Morton	September 21, 2007		Catcher	San Diego Padres	
Guy Morton	June 20, 1914	June 6, 1924	Pitcher	Cleveland Indians	
Guy Morton Jr.	September 17, 1954	September 17, 1954	Pinch hitter	Boston Red Sox	
Kevin Morton	July 5, 1991	October 3, 1991	Pitcher	Boston Red Sox	
Sparrow Morton	July 15, 1884	July 26, 1884	Pitcher	Philadelphia Quakers	
Walt Moryn	June 29, 1954	September 28, 1961	Outfielder	Brooklyn Dodgers, Chicago Cubs, St. Louis Cardinals, Pittsburgh Pirates	
Ross Moschitto	April 15, 1965	September 25, 1967	Outfielder	New York Yankees	
Guillermo Moscoso	May 30, 2009		Pitcher	Texas Rangers, Oakland Athletics	
Bobby Mosebach	July 25, 2009		Pitcher	Los Angeles Angels of Anaheim	
Lloyd Moseby	May 24, 1980	October 6, 1991	Outfielder	Toronto Blue Jays, Detroit Tigers	
Dustin Moseley	July 17, 2006		Pitcher	Los Angeles Angels of Anaheim, New York Yankees, San Diego Padres	
Earl Moseley	June 17, 1913	September 25, 1916	Pitcher	Boston Red Sox, Indianapolis Hoosiers (FL)/Newark Peppers, Cincinnati Reds	
Arnie Moser	June 20, 1937	July 3, 1937	Pinch hitter	Cincinnati Reds	
Walter Moser	September 3, 1906	September 9, 1911	Pitcher	Philadelphia Phillies, Boston Red Sox, St. Louis Browns	
Jerry Moses	May 9, 1965	August 9, 1975	Catcher	Boston Red Sox, California Angels, Cleveland Indians, New York Yankees, Detroit Tigers, San Diego Padres, Chicago White Sox	
John Moses	August 23, 1982	October 4, 1992	Outfielder	Seattle Mariners, Minnesota Twins, Detroit Tigers	
Wally Moses	April 17, 1935	September 30, 1951	Outfielder	Philadelphia Athletics, Chicago White Sox, Boston Red Sox	
Paul Moskau	June 21, 1977	May 31, 1983	Pitcher	Cincinnati Reds, Pittsburgh Pirates, Chicago Cubs	
Doc Moskiman	August 23, 1910	October 8, 1910	First baseman	Boston Red Sox	
Daniel Moskos	April 30, 2011		Pitcher	Pittsburgh Pirates	
Jim Mosolf	September 9, 1929	September 19, 1933	Outfielder	Pittsburgh Pirates, Chicago Cubs	
Julio Mosquera	August 17, 1996	June 8, 2005	Catcher	Toronto Blue Jays, Milwaukee Brewers	
Brandon Moss	August 6, 2007		Outfielder	Boston Red Sox, Pittsburgh Pirates, Philadelphia Phillies	
Charlie Moss	May 19, 1934	September 16, 1936	Catcher	Philadelphia Athletics	
Damian Moss	April 26, 2001	April 29, 2004	Pitcher	Atlanta Braves, San Francisco Giants, Baltimore Orioles, Tampa Bay Devil Rays	
Howie Moss	April 14, 1942	September 26, 1946	Utility player	New York Giants, Cincinnati Reds, Cleveland Indians	
Les Moss	September 10, 1946	September 1, 1958	Catcher	St. Louis Browns, Boston Red Sox, Baltimore Orioles, Chicago White Sox	
Mal Moss	April 29, 1930	August 13, 1930	Pitcher	Chicago Cubs	
Ray Moss	April 17, 1926	August 2, 1931	Pitcher	Brooklyn Robins, Boston Braves	
Don Mossi	April 17, 1954	October 1, 1965	Pitcher	Cleveland Indians, Detroit Tigers, Chicago White Sox, Kansas City Athletics	
Earl Mossor	April 30, 1951	May 16, 1951	Pitcher	Brooklyn Dodgers	
Johnny Mostil	June 20, 1918	May 19, 1929	Outfielder	Chicago White Sox	
Andy Mota	August 31, 1991	October 6, 1991	Second baseman	Houston Astros	
Danny Mota	September 15, 2000	October 1, 2000	Pitcher	Minnesota Twins	
Guillermo Mota	May 2, 1999		Pitcher	Montreal Expos, Los Angeles Dodgers, Florida Marlins, Cleveland Indians, New York Mets, Milwaukee Brewers, San Francisco Giants	
José Mota	May 24, 1991	June 2, 1995	Second baseman	San Diego Padres, Kansas City Royals	
Manny Mota	April 16, 1962	September 1, 1982	Outfielder	San Francisco Giants, Pittsburgh Pirates, Montreal Expos, Los Angeles Dodgers	
Darryl Motley	August 10, 1981	May 17, 1987	Outfielder	Kansas City Royals, Atlanta Braves	
Bitsy Mott	April 17, 1945	September 30, 1945	Shortstop	Philadelphia Phillies	
Jason Motte	September 3, 2008		Pitcher	St. Louis Cardinals	
Chad Mottola	April 23, 1996	July 26, 2006	Outfielder	Cincinnati Reds, Toronto Blue Jays, Florida Marlins, Baltimore Orioles	
Curt Motton	July 5, 1967	October 2, 1974	Outfielder	Baltimore Orioles, Milwaukee Brewers, California Angels	
Frank Motz	August 27, 1890	May 19, 1894	First baseman	Philadelphia Phillies, Cincinnati Reds	
Glen Moulder	April 28, 1946	September 18, 1948	Pitcher	Brooklyn Dodgers, St. Louis Browns, Chicago White Sox	
Allie Moulton	September 25, 1911	September 30, 1911	Second baseman	St. Louis Browns	
Tony Mounce	June 13, 2003	September 22, 2003	Pitcher	Texas Rangers	
Frank Mountain	July 19, 1880	August 17, 1886	Pitcher	Troy Trojans, Detroit Wolverines, Worcester Ruby Legs, Philadelphia Athletics (AA), Columbus Buckeyes, Pittsburgh Alleghenys	
Bill Mountjoy	September 29, 1883	August 18, 1885	Pitcher	Cincinnati Red Stockings (AA), Baltimore Orioles (AA)	
Mike Moustakas	June 10, 2011		Third baseman	Kansas City Royals	
James Mouton	April 4, 1994	October 7, 2001	Outfielder	Houston Astros, San Diego Padres, Montreal Expos, Milwaukee Brewers	
Lyle Mouton	June 7, 1995	May 19, 2001	Outfielder	Chicago White Sox, Baltimore Orioles, Milwaukee Brewers, Florida Marlins	
Ray Mowe	September 25, 1913	October 3, 1913	Shortstop	Brooklyn Superbas	
Mike Mowrey	September 24, 1905	August 13, 1917	Third baseman	Cincinnati Reds, St. Louis Cardinals, Pittsburgh Pirates, Pittsburgh Burghers, Brooklyn Robins	
Joe Mowry	May 13, 1933	September 29, 1935	Outfielder	Boston Braves	
Ed Moyer	July 20, 1910	October 4, 1910	Pitcher	Washington Senators	
Jamie Moyer	June 16, 1986		Pitcher	Chicago Cubs, Texas Rangers, St. Louis Cardinals, Baltimore Orioles, Boston Red Sox, Seattle Mariners, Philadelphia Phillies	
Peter Moylan	April 12, 2006		Pitcher	Atlanta Braves	
Mike Moynahan	August 20, 1880	June 21, 1884	Shortstop	Buffalo Bisons (NL), Cleveland Blues (NL), Detroit Wolverines, Philadelphia Athletics (AA)	
Ron Mrozinski	June 20, 1954	September 9, 1955	Pitcher	Philadelphia Phillies	
Phil Mudrock	April 19, 1963	April 19, 1963	Pitcher	Chicago Cubs	
Bill Mueller (OF)	August 29, 1942	September 25, 1945	Outfielder	Chicago White Sox	
Bill Mueller (3B)	April 18, 1996	May 11, 2006	Third baseman	San Francisco Giants, Chicago Cubs, Boston Red Sox, Los Angeles Dodgers	
Don Mueller	August 2, 1948	May 2, 1959	Outfielder	New York Giants, Chicago White Sox	
Gordie Mueller	April 19, 1950	July 21, 1950	Pitcher	Boston Red Sox	
Heinie Mueller (OF)	September 25, 1920	June 15, 1935	Outfielder	St. Louis Cardinals, New York Giants, Boston Braves, St. Louis Browns	
Heinie Mueller (2B)	April 19, 1938	September 28, 1941	Second baseman	Philadelphia Phillies	
Les Mueller	August 15, 1941	September 23, 1945	Pitcher	Detroit Tigers	
Ray Mueller	May 11, 1935	September 9, 1951	Catcher	Boston Braves/Bees, Pittsburgh Pirates, Cincinnati Reds, New York Giants	
Walter Mueller	May 7, 1922	September 25, 1926	Outfielder	Pittsburgh Pirates	
Willie Mueller	August 12, 1978	September 20, 1981	Pitcher	Milwaukee Brewers	
Billy Muffett	August 3, 1957	April 28, 1962	Pitcher	St. Louis Cardinals, San Francisco Giants, Boston Red Sox	
Joe Muich	September 4, 1924	September 19, 1924	Pitcher	Boston Braves	
Joe Muir	April 21, 1951	June 27, 1952	Pitcher	Pittsburgh Pirates	
Edward Mujica	June 21, 2006		Pitcher	Cleveland Indians, San Diego Padres, Florida Marlins	
Hugh Mulcahy	July 24, 1935	May 8, 1947	Pitcher	Philadelphia Phillies, Pittsburgh Pirates	
Mark Mulder	April 18, 2000	July 9, 2008	Pitcher	Oakland Athletics, St. Louis Cardinals	
Mike Muldoon	May 1, 1882	October 10, 1886	Third baseman	Cleveland Blues (NL), Baltimore Orioles (AA)	
Terry Mulholland	June 8, 1986	June 3, 2006	Pitcher	San Francisco Giants, Philadelphia Phillies, New York Yankees, Seattle Mariners, Chicago Cubs, Atlanta Braves, Pittsburgh Pirates, Los Angeles Dodgers, Cleveland Indians, Minnesota Twins, Arizona Diamondbacks	
Tony Mullane	August 27, 1881	July 26, 1894	Pitcher	Detroit Wolverine, Louisville Eclipse, St. Louis Browns (AA), Toledo Blue Stockings, Cincinnati Red Stockings (AA)/Reds, Baltimore Orioles (NL), Cleveland Spiders	
Greg Mulleavy	July 4, 1930	April 13, 1933	Shortstop	Chicago White Sox, Boston Red Sox	
Billy Mullen	October 2, 1920	June 5, 1928	Third baseman	St. Louis Browns, Brooklyn Robins, Detroit Tigers	
Charlie Mullen	May 18, 1910	September 30, 1916	First baseman	Chicago White Sox, New York Yankees	
Jim Mullen	June 1, 1904	July 8, 1905	Second baseman	Philadelphia Athletics, Washington Senators	
John Mullen	September 9, 1876	September 9, 1876	Catcher	Philadelphia Athletics (1860–76)	
Martin Mullen	August 17, 1872	August 17, 1872	Outfielder	Cleveland Forest Citys	
Moon Mullen	April 18, 1944	October 1, 1944	Second baseman	Philadelphia Phillies	
Scott Mullen	August 31, 2000	August 3, 2003	Pitcher	Kansas City Royals, Los Angeles Dodgers	
Freddie Muller	July 8, 1933	May 13, 1934	Second baseman	Boston Red Sox	
Dick Mulligan	September 24, 1941	May 4, 1947	Pitcher	Washington Senators, Philadelphia Phillies, Boston Braves	
Eddie Mulligan	September 23, 1915	August 20, 1928	Third baseman	Chicago Cubs, Chicago White Sox, Pittsburgh Pirates	
Joe Mulligan	June 28, 1934	September 30, 1934	Pitcher	Boston Red Sox	
John Mulligan	June 14, 1884	June 14, 1884	Third baseman	Washington Nationals (UA)	
Sean Mulligan	September 1, 1996	September 6, 1996	Pinch hitter	San Diego Padres	
George Mullin	May 4, 1902	May 23, 1915	Pitcher	Detroit Tigers, Washington Senators, Indianapolis Hoosiers (FL)/Newark Peppers	
Henry Mullin	June 4, 1884	September 24, 1884	Outfielder	Washington Nationals (AA), Boston Reds (UA)	
Pat Mullin	September 18, 1940	September 27, 1953	Outfielder	Detroit Tigers	
Rance Mulliniks	June 18, 1977	September 18, 1992	Third baseman	California Angels, Kansas City Royals, Toronto Blue Jays	
Fran Mullins	September 1, 1980	September 30, 1986	Utility infielder	Chicago White Sox, San Francisco Giants, Cleveland Indians	
Greg Mullins	September 18, 1998	September 22, 1998	Pitcher	Milwaukee Brewers	
Dominic Mulrenan	April 24, 1921	August 5, 1921	Pitcher	Chicago White Sox	
Frank Mulroney	April 15, 1930	June 24, 1930	Pitcher	Boston Red Sox	
Joe Mulvey	May 31, 1883	May 14, 1895	Third baseman	Providence Grays, Philadelphia Quakers/Phillies, Philadelphia Athletics (1890–91), Washington Senators (NL), Brooklyn Grooms	
Kevin Mulvey	July 20, 2009		Pitcher	Minnesota Twins, Arizona Diamondbacks	
Jerry Mumphrey	September 10, 1974	September 30, 1988	Outfielder	St. Louis Cardinals, San Diego Padres, New York Yankees, Houston Astros, Chicago Cubs	
John Munce	August 19, 1884	September 5, 1884	Outfielder	Wilmington Quicksteps	
Jake Munch	May 27, 1918	August 27, 1918	Utility player	Philadelphia Athletics	
Bob Muncrief	September 30, 1937	April 20, 1951	Pitcher	St. Louis Browns, Cleveland Indians, Pittsburgh Pirates, Chicago Cubs, New York Yankees	
George Mundinger	May 9, 1884	May 20, 1884	Catcher	Indianapolis Hoosiers (AA)	
Bill Mundy	August 17, 1913	October 4, 1913	First baseman	Boston Red Sox	
Red Munger	May 1, 1943	September 23, 1956	Pitcher	St. Louis Cardinals, Pittsburgh Pirates	
Van Mungo	September 7, 1931	September 2, 1945	Pitcher	Brooklyn Robins/Dodgers, New York Giants	
Carlos Muñiz	September 25, 2007		Pitcher	New York Mets	
Manny Muñiz	September 3, 1971	September 17, 1971	Pitcher	Philadelphia Phillies	
Horatio Munn	September 4, 1875	September 4, 1875	Second baseman	Brooklyn Atlantics	
Scott Munninghoff	April 13, 1980	May 4, 1980	Pitcher	Philadelphia Phillies	
Les Munns	April 22, 1934	July 14, 1936	Pitcher	Brooklyn Dodgers, St. Louis Cardinals	
Arnie Muñoz	June 19, 2004	September 28, 2007	Pitcher	Chicago White Sox, Washington Nationals	
Bobby Muñoz	May 29, 1993	October 4, 2001	Pitcher	New York Yankees, Philadelphia Phillies, Baltimore Orioles, Montreal Expos	
Jose Munoz	April 7, 1996	May 31, 1996	Second baseman	Chicago White Sox	
Mike Munoz	September 6, 1989	April 26, 2000	Pitcher	Los Angeles Dodgers, Detroit Tigers, Colorado Rockies, Texas Rangers	
Noe Muñoz	April 30, 1995	May 14, 1995	Catcher	Los Angeles Dodgers	
Oscar Múñoz	August 6, 1995	September 30, 1995	Pitcher	Minnesota Twins	
Pedro Muñoz	September 1, 1990	June 1, 1996	Outfielder	Minnesota Twins, Oakland Athletics	
Pete Munro	April 6, 1999	October 1, 2004	Pitcher	Toronto Blue Jays, Houston Astros	
Eric Munson	July 18, 2000		Third baseman	Detroit Tigers, Tampa Bay Devil Rays, Houston Astros, Oakland Athletics	
Joe Munson	September 18, 1925	June 4, 1926	Outfielder	Chicago Cubs	
Red Munson	August 28, 1905	October 7, 1905	Catcher	Philadelphia Phillies	
Thurman Munson	August 8, 1969	August 1, 1979	Catcher	New York Yankees	
Scott Munter	May 11, 2005	September 28, 2007	Pitcher	San Francisco Giants	
John Munyan	July 12, 1887	October 4, 1891	Catcher	Cleveland Blues (AA), Columbus Solons, St. Louis Browns (AA)	
Steve Mura	September 5, 1978	October 6, 1985	Pitcher	San Diego Padres, St. Louis Cardinals, Chicago White Sox, Oakland Athletics	
Masanori Murakami	September 1, 1964	October 1, 1965	Pitcher	San Francisco Giants	
Bobby Murcer	September 8, 1965	June 11, 1983	Outfielder	New York Yankees, San Francisco Giants, Chicago Cubs	
Simmy Murch	September 20, 1904	May 22, 1908	Utility infielder	St. Louis Cardinals, Brooklyn Superbas	
Tim Murchison	June 21, 1917	May 3, 1920	Pitcher	St. Louis Cardinals, Cleveland Indians	
Wilbur Murdoch	August 29, 1908	October 3, 1908	Outfielder	St. Louis Cardinals	
Red Murff	April 21, 1956	May 30, 1957	Pitcher	Milwaukee Braves	
Tim Murnane	April 26, 1872	October 19, 1884	First baseman	Middletown Mansfields, Philadelphia Athletics (1860–76), Philadelphia Whites, Boston Red Caps, Providence Grays, Boston Reds (UA)	
Murphy, first name unknown	August 16, 1884	August 16, 1884	Utility player	Boston Reds (UA)	
Bill Murphy	September 3, 2007		Pitcher	Arizona Diamondbacks, Toronto Blue Jays	
Billy Murphy	April 15, 1966	September 5, 1966	Outfielder	New York Mets	
Bob Murphy	May 27, 1890	August 25, 1890	Pitcher	New York Giants, Brooklyn Gladiators	
Buzz Murphy	July 14, 1918	September 21, 1919	Outfielder	Boston Braves, Washington Senators	
Clarence Murphy	June 17, 1886	June 17, 1886	Outfielder	Louisville Colonels	
Con Murphy	September 11, 1884	October 6, 1890	Pitcher	Philadelphia Quakers, Brooklyn Ward's Wonders	
Connie Murphy	September 17, 1893	September 30, 1894	Catcher	Cincinnati Reds	
Dale Murphy	September 13, 1976	May 21, 1993	Outfielder	Atlanta Braves, Philadelphia Phillies, Colorado Rockies	
Dan Murphy	August 10, 1989	September 14, 1989	Pitcher	San Diego Padres	
Daniel Murphy	August 2, 2008		First baseman	New York Mets	
Danny Murphy (C)	April 26, 1892	June 11, 1892	Catcher	New York Giants	
Danny Murphy (2B)	September 17, 1900	July 1, 1915	Second baseman	New York Giants, Philadelphia Athletics, Brooklyn Tip-Tops	
Danny Murphy (P)	June 18, 1960	October 1, 1970	Pitcher	Chicago cubs, Chicago White Sox	
Dave Murphy	August 28, 1905	August 30, 1905	Shortstop	Boston Beaneaters	
David Murphy	September 2, 2006		Outfielder	Boston Red Sox, Texas Rangers	
Dick Murphy	June 13, 1954	September 13, 1954	Pinch runner	Cincinnati Redlegs	
Donnie Murphy	September 18, 2004		Utility infielder	Kansas City Royals, Oakland Athletics, Florida Marlins	
Herbert Murphy	April 14, 1914	May 7, 1914	Shortstop	Philadelphia Phillies	
Dwayne Murphy	April 8, 1978	October 1, 1989	Outfielder	Oakland Athletics, Detroit Tigers, Philadelphia Phillies	
Ed Murphy (P)	April 23, 1898	September 19, 1903	Pitcher	Philadelphia Phillies, St. Louis Cardinals	
Ed Murphy (1B)	September 10, 1942	September 27, 1942	First baseman	Philadelphia Phillies	
Eddie Murphy	August 16, 1912	September 13, 1926	Outfielder	Philadelphia Athletics, Chicago White Sox, Pittsburgh Pirates	
Frank Murphy	July 2, 1901	October 5, 1901	Outfielder	Boston Beaneaters, New York Giants	
Howard Murphy	August 4, 1909	October 6, 1909	Outfielder	St. Louis Cardinals	
Joe Murphy	April 28, 1886	August 19, 1887	Pitcher	Cincinnati Red Stockings (AA), St. Louis Maroons, St. Louis Browns (AA)	
John Murphy (P)	April 17, 1884	September 12, 1884	Pitcher	Altoona Mountain City, Wilmington Quicksteps	
John Murphy (IF)	September 10, 1902	September 25, 1903	Shortstop	St. Louis Cardinals, Detroit Tigers	
Johnny Murphy	May 19, 1932	September 16, 1947	Pitcher	New York Yankees, Boston Red Sox	
Larry Murphy	May 30, 1891	October 6, 1891	Outfielder	Washington Statesmen	
Leo Murphy	May 2, 1915	September 25, 1915	Catcher	Pittsburgh Pirates	
Mike Murphy	May 17, 1912	July 11, 1916	Catcher	St. Louis Cardinals, Philadelphia Athletics	
Morgan Murphy	April 22, 1890	May 31, 1901	Catcher	Boston Reds (1890–91), Cincinnati Reds, St. Louis Browns (NL), Pittsburgh Pirates, Philadelphia Phillies, Philadelphia Athletics	
Pat Murphy	September 2, 1887	October 3, 1890	Catcher	New York Giants	
Rob Murphy	September 13, 1985	July 22, 1995	Pitcher	Cincinnati Reds, Boston Red Sox, Seattle Mariners, Houston Astros, St. Louis Cardinals, New York Yankees, Los Angeles Dodgers, Florida Marlins	
Tom Murphy	June 13, 1968	May 8, 1979	Pittsburgh Pirates	California Angels, Kansas City Royals, St. Louis Cardinals, Milwaukee Brewers, Boston Red Sox, Toronto Blue Jays	
Tommy Murphy	May 4, 2006	September 30, 2007	Outfielder	Los Angeles Angels of Anaheim	
Tony Murphy	October 15, 1884	October 15, 1884	Catcher	New York Metropolitans	
Walter Murphy	April 19, 1931	April 21, 1931	Pitcher	Boston Red Sox	
Willie Murphy	May 1, 1884	August 2, 1884	Outfielder	Cleveland Blues (NL), Washington Nationals (AA)	
Yale Murphy	April 19, 1894	July 26, 1897	Utility player	New York Giants	
A. J. Murray	May 16, 2007		Pitcher	Texas Rangers	
Amby Murray	July 5, 1936	July 19, 1936	Pitcher	Boston Bees	
Bill Murray	June 27, 1917	September 21, 1917	Second baseman	Washington Senators	
Bobby Murray	September 24, 1923	October 7, 1923	Third baseman	Washington Senators	
Calvin Murray	June 22, 1999	October 1, 2004	Outfielder	San Francisco Giants, Texas Rangers, Chicago Cubs	
Dale Murray	July 7, 1974	May 13, 1985	Pitcher	Montreal Expos, Cincinnati Reds, New York Mets, Toronto Blue Jays, New York Yankees, Texas Rangers	
Dan Murray	August 9, 1999	September 30, 2000	Pitcher	New York Mets, Kansas City Royals	
Ed Murray	June 24, 1917	June 24, 1917	Shortstop	St. Louis Browns	
Eddie Murray β	April 7, 1977	September 20, 1997	First baseman	Baltimore Orioles, Los Angeles Dodgers, New York Mets, Cleveland Indians, Anaheim Angels	
George Murray	May 8, 1922	May 1, 1933	Pitcher	New York Yankees, Boston Red Sox, Washington Senators, Chicago White Sox	
Glenn Murray	May 10, 1996	July 24, 1996	Outfielder	Philadelphia Phillies	
Heath Murray	May 24, 1997	July 21, 2002	Pitcher	San Diego Padres, Detroit Tigers, Cleveland Indians	
Jim Murray (OF)	September 2, 1902	July 10, 1914	Outfielder	Chicago Orphans, St. Louis Browns, Boston Braves	
Jim Murray (P)	July 3, 1922	September 24, 1922	Pitcher	Brooklyn Robins	
Joe Murray	August 17, 1950	September 28, 1950	Pitcher	Philadelphia Athletics	
Larry Murray	September 7, 1974	September 23, 1979	Outfielder	New York Yankees, Oakland Athletics	
Matt Murray	August 12, 1995	September 25, 1995	Pitcher	Atlanta Braves, Boston Red Sox	
Miah Murray	May 17, 1884	October 3, 1891	Catcher	Providence Grays, Louisville Colonels, Washington Nationals (1886–1889), Washington Statesmen	
Pat Murray	July 1, 1919	August 22, 1919	Pitcher	Philadelphia Phillies	
Ray Murray	April 25, 1948	September 25, 1954	Catcher	Cleveland Indians, Philadelphia Athletics, Baltimore Orioles	
Red Murray	June 16, 1906	October 3, 1917	Outfielder	St. Louis Cardinals, New York Giants, Chicago Cubs	
Rich Murray	June 7, 1980	July 4, 1983	First baseman	San Francisco Giants	
Tom Murray	June 20, 1894	June 20, 1894	Shortstop	Philadelphia Phillies	
Tony Murray	October 6, 1923	October 7, 1923	Outfielder	Chicago Cubs	
Ivan Murrell	September 28, 1963	October 2, 1974	Outfielder	Houston Astros, San Diego Padres, Atlanta Braves	
Danny Murtaugh	July 6, 1941	September 6, 1951	Second baseman	Philadelphia Phillies, Boston Braves, Pittsburgh Pirates	
Matt Murton	July 8, 2005		Outfielder	Chicago Cubs, Oakland Athletics, Colorado Rockies	
Tony Muser	September 14, 1969	October 1, 1978	First baseman	Boston Red Sox, Chicago White Sox, Baltimore Orioles, Milwaukee Brewers	
Dennis Musgraves	July 9, 1965	July 29, 1965	Pitcher	New York Mets	
Stan Musial β	September 17, 1941	September 29, 1963	Outfielder	St. Louis Cardinals	
Jeff Musselman	September 2, 1986	September 7, 1990	Pitcher	Toronto Blue Jays, New York Mets	
Ron Musselman	August 18, 1982	August 23, 1985	Pitcher	Seattle Mariners, Toronto Blue Jays	
Danny Musser	September 18, 1932	September 18, 1932	Third baseman	Washington Senators	
Neal Musser	April 21, 2007		Pitcher	Kansas City Royals	
Paul Musser	June 6, 1912	August 12, 1919	Pitcher	Washington Senators, Boston Red Sox	
Barney Mussill	April 20, 1944	July 26, 1944	Pitcher	Philadelphia Phillies	
Mike Mussina	August 4, 1991	September 28, 2008	Pitcher	Baltimore Orioles, New York Yankees	
Alex Mustaikis	July 7, 1940	August 3, 1940	Pitcher	Boston Red Sox	
Jeff Mutis	June 15, 1991	July 31, 1994	Pitcher	Cleveland Indians, Florida Marlins	
George Myatt	August 16, 1938	May 19, 1947	Second baseman	New York Giants, Washington Senators	
Glenn Myatt	April 15, 1920	September 9, 1936	Catcher	Philadelphia Athletics, Cleveland Indians, New York Giants, Detroit Tigers	
Buddy Myer	September 26, 1925	September 24, 1941	Second baseman	Washington Senators, Boston Red Sox	
Al Myers	September 27, 1884	October 3, 1891	Second baseman	Milwaukee Brewers (UA), Philadelphia Quakers, Kansas City Cowboys (NL), Washington Nationals (1886–1889), Philadelphia Phillies	
Bert Myers	April 25, 1896	April 27, 1900	Third baseman	St. Louis Cardinals, Washington Senators (NL), Philadelphia Phillies	
Billy Myers	April 16, 1935	September 25, 1941	Shortstop	Cincinnati Reds, Chicago Cubs	
Brett Myers	July 24, 2002		Pitcher	Philadelphia Phillies, Houston Astros	
Elmer Myers	October 6, 1915	April 24, 1922	Pitcher	Philadelphia Athletics, Cleveland Indians, Boston Red Sox	
George Myers	May 2, 1884	August 3, 1889	Catcher	Buffalo Bisons (NL), St. Louis Maroons/Indianapolis Hoosiers (NL)	
Greg Myers	September 12, 1987	April 22, 2005	Catcher	Toronto Blue Jays, California Angels, Minnesota Twins, Atlanta Braves, San Diego Padres, Baltimore Orioles, Oakland Athletics	
Hap Myers	April 16, 1910	September 30, 1915	First baseman	Boston Red Sox, St. Louis Browns, Boston Braves, Brooklyn Tip-Tops	
Henry Myers	August 20, 1881	September 12, 1884	Shortstop	Providence Grays, Baltimore Orioles (AA), Wilmington Quicksteps	
Hy Myers	August 30, 1909	May 7, 1925	Outfielder	Brooklyn Superbas/Dodgers/Robins, St. Louis Cardinals, Cincinnati Reds	
Jimmy Myers	April 6, 1996	May 5, 1996	Pitcher	Baltimore Orioles	
Joseph Myers	October 7, 1905	October 7, 1905	Pitcher	Philadelphia Athletics	
Lynn Myers	July 13, 1938	October 1, 1939	Shortstop	St. Louis Cardinals	
Mike Myers	April 25, 1995	September 30, 2007	Pitcher	Florida Marlins, Detroit Tigers, Milwaukee Brewers, Colorado Rockies, Arizona Diamondbacks, Seattle Mariners, Boston Red Sox, New York Yankees, Chicago White Sox	
Randy Myers	October 6, 1985	September 25, 1998	Pitcher	New York Mets, Cincinnati Reds, San Diego Padres, Chicago Cubs, Baltimore Orioles, Toronto Blue Jays	
Richie Myers	April 21, 1956	May 2, 1956	Pinch runner	Chicago Cubs	
Rod Myers	June 21, 1996	September 28, 1997	Outfielder	Kansas City Royals	
Rodney Myers	April 3, 1996	June 1, 2004	Pitcher	Chicago Cubs, San Diego Padres, Los Angeles Dodgers	
Aaron Myette	September 7, 1999	September 27, 2004	Pitcher	Chicago White Sox, Texas Rangers, Cleveland Indians, Cincinnati Reds	
Bob Myrick	May 28, 1976	May 18, 1978	Pitcher	New York Mets	
Brian Myrow	September 6, 2005	August 21, 2008	First baseman	Los Angeles Dodgers, San Diego Padres	
