= Charles Monro =

Charles Monro may refer to:

- Sir Charles Monro, 1st Baronet (1860–1929), governor of Gibraltar
- Charles Monro (rugby union) (1851–1933), initiator of rugby union in New Zealand
- Charles Henry Monro (1835–1908), English author, jurist and benefactor
- Charles Ernest Monro (1874–1945), Scottish architect
- Charles Carmichael Arthur Monro (1894–1942), British zoologist

== See also ==
- Charles Monroe (disambiguation)
- Charles Edward Munroe (1849–1938), American chemist
