= Frank Monroe =

Frank Monroe may refer to:

- Frank Monroe (baseball) (1855–1908), Major League Baseball player
- Frank A. Monroe (1844–1927), Chief Justice of the Louisiana Supreme Court

== See also ==
- Frank Munro (1947–2011), Scottish international footballer
- Frank Munro (Australian footballer) (1934–2011), Australian rules footballer
- Frank Monroe Clark (1915–2003), U.S. congressman from Pennsylvania
- Frank Monroe Hawks (1897–1938), U.S. Army pilot in World War I
- Frank Monroe Upton (1896–1962), U.S. Navy sailor
