= Petronilo Monroy =

Mexican painter

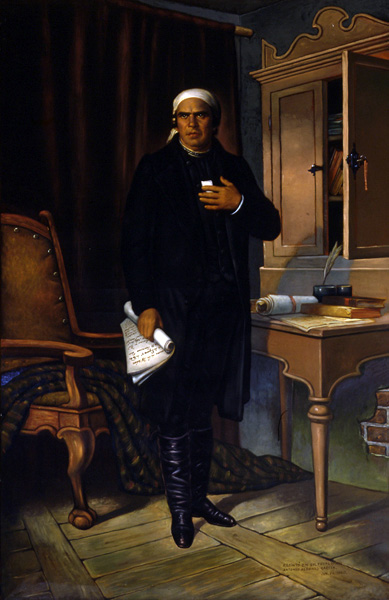
Portrait of José María Morelos by Petronilo Monroy

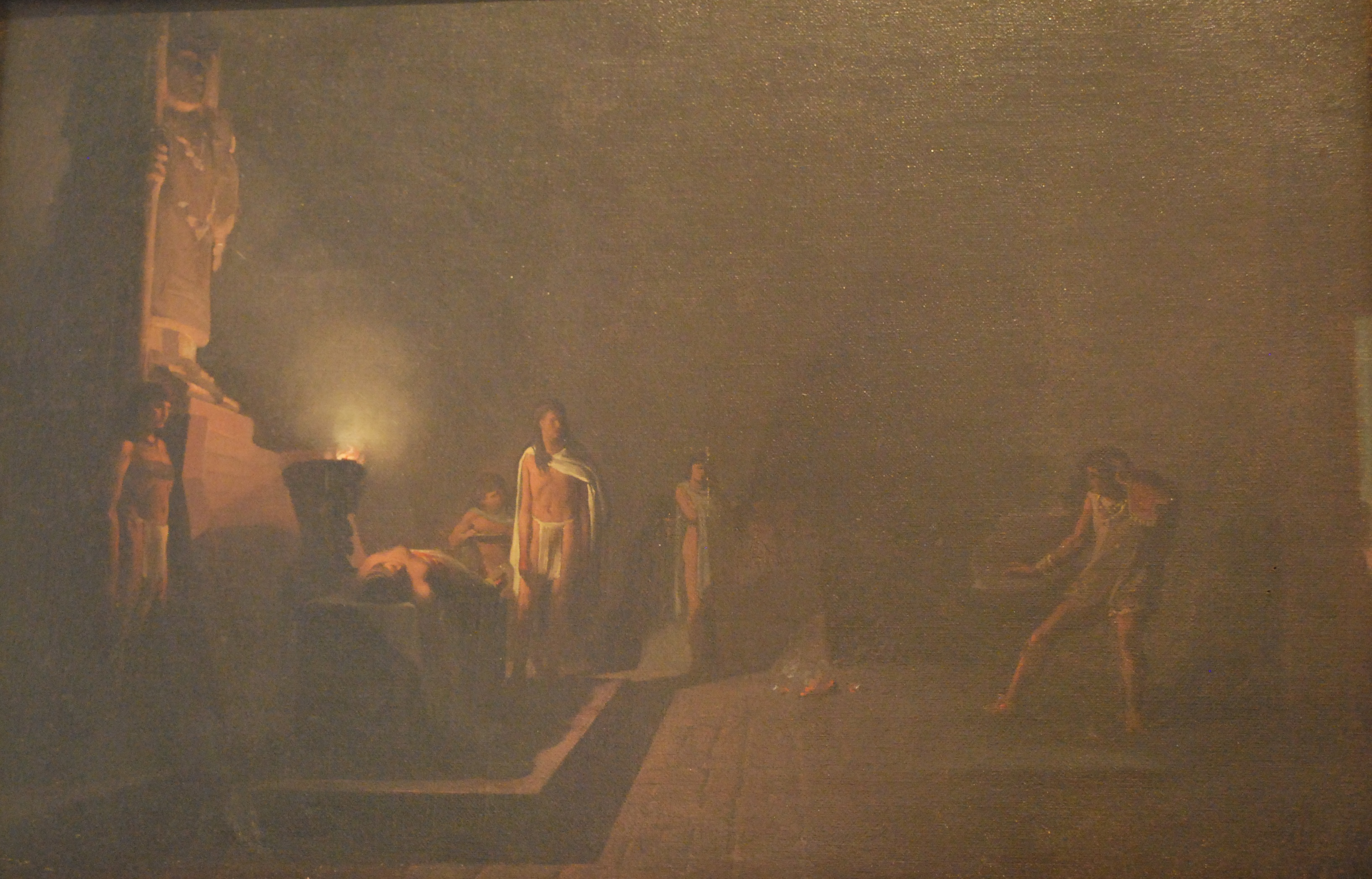
The Sacrifice of an Acolhua Princess (1881)

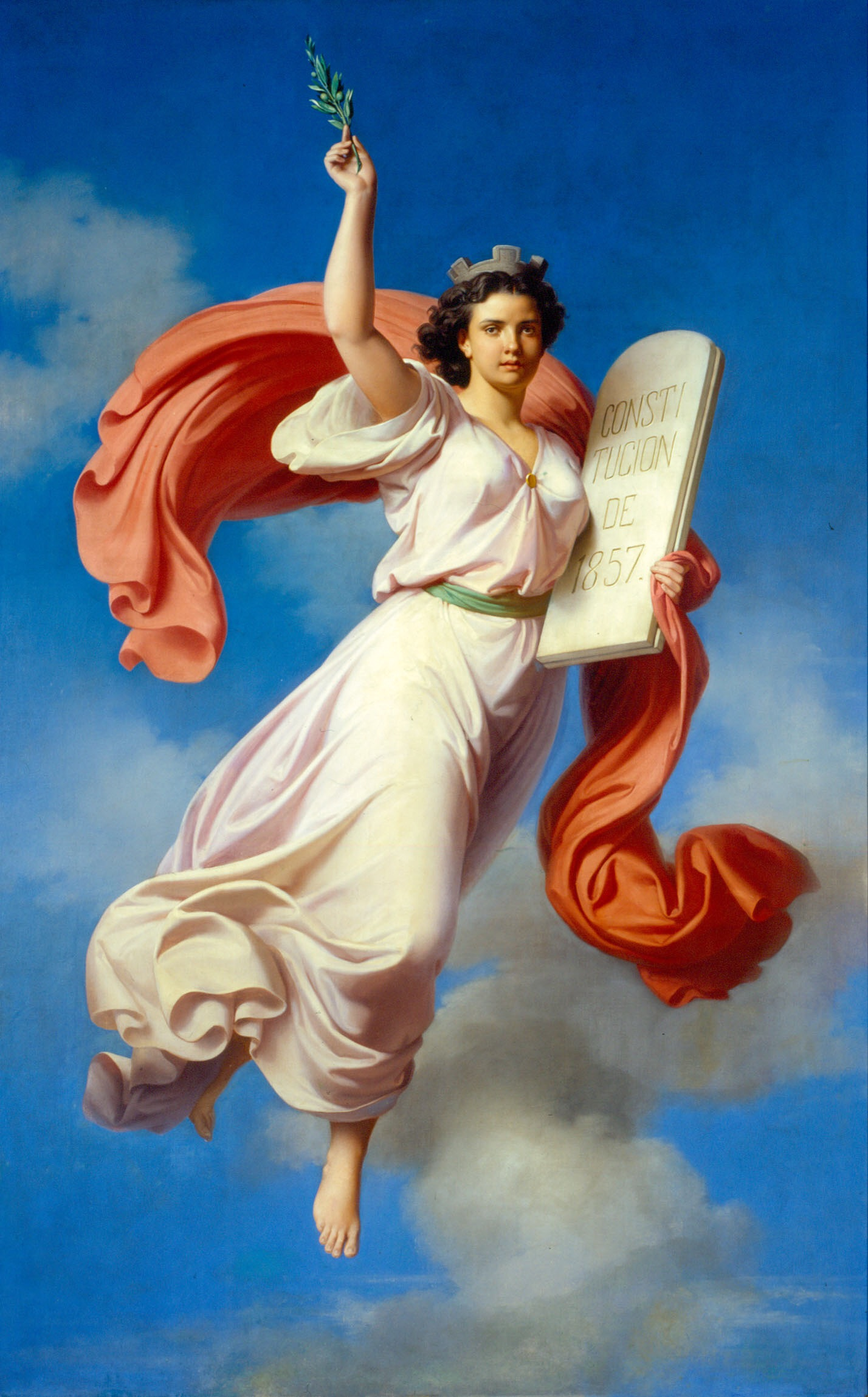
Allegory of the Constitution of 1857

Petronilo Guillermo Monroy Briseño (Note: In this name that follows Hispanic American naming customs, the first or paternal surname is Monroy and the second or maternal family name is Briseño.) (6 September 1832 – 21 July 1882) was a Mexican painter associated with historical and nationalist themes in 19th-century Mexican art. His work included portraits of historical figures such as José María Morelos and Agustín de Iturbide, paintings depicting pre-Hispanic subjects including Cuauhtémoc and The Sacrifice of the Acolhua Princess, and allegorical works such as the Allegory of the Constitution of 1857.

Monroy's paintings reflect the development of nationalist imagery in Mexican academic art during the decades following independence. Although trained in the European academic tradition, he often addressed subjects drawn from Mexican history and mythology.

During periods of economic hardship, Monroy also produced decorative murals and sign paintings for commercial establishments, including pulquerías. One of the most notable examples was the mural La Fuente Embriagadora.

== Early life and education ==
Petronilo Monroy was born on 6 September 1832 in Tenancingo, in the State of Mexico. He was the son of Manuel Monroy and Josefina Briseño.

He was introduced to painting by his brother, the painter José María Monroy, who encouraged him to pursue artistic training.

Monroy later enrolled at the Academy of San Carlos in Mexico City, the principal academic institution for the visual arts in Mexico during the 19th century. At the academy he studied under the Spanish painter Pelegrín Clavé, who served as director of the institution, and the sculptor Manuel Villar.

Under Clavé he received training in academic painting, drawing, and composition, while his studies with Villar introduced him to sculptural techniques and classical artistic traditions.

In honor of Villar, Monroy painted The Virgin of Mercy, which forms part of a monument created by Villar's students in the Church of Jesús Nazareno in Mexico City.

== Career ==
Monroy developed a career producing portraits, historical paintings, and allegorical works that reflected contemporary debates about Mexican identity and nationhood.

During the Second Mexican Empire he collaborated with the government of Maximilian I. At the emperor's request he painted portraits of national historical figures, including José María Morelos and Agustín de Iturbide.

After the fall of the empire and the restoration of the republic in 1867, Monroy received an official pardon under President Benito Juárez, restoring his civil rights and allowing him to continue his professional activities.

Between 1868 and 1869, he completed the painting Allegory of the Constitution of 1857. The work represents the Mexican nation as a female allegorical figure descending from the heavens while holding the tablets of the 1857 Constitution and an olive branch symbolizing peace. The painting is preserved in the collection of the Museo Nacional de Arte in Mexico City.

Monroy later resumed teaching ornamentation and decorative arts at the Academy of San Carlos.

His painting The Sacrifice of an Acolhua Princess (1881) depicts a pre-Hispanic ceremonial scene and reflects the growing interest among Mexican academic painters in indigenous history and mythology.

== Artistic style ==
Monroy's work combined elements of European academic painting with subjects drawn from Mexican history. His compositions frequently incorporated allegorical figures and historical narratives intended to represent national identity and political ideals.

Art historians have noted that his paintings form part of a broader 19th-century movement in which Mexican artists used academic techniques to construct visual narratives about the nation's past.

== Selected works ==
Known works by Monroy include:

- Allegory of the Constitution of 1857 (1868–1869) – Museo Nacional de Arte, Mexico City
- The Sacrifice of an Acolhua Princess (1881)
- Portrait of José María Morelos
- Portrait of Agustín de Iturbide
- The Virgin of Mercy – Church of Jesús Nazareno, Mexico City
- La Fuente Embriagadora (decorative mural for the pulquería of the same name on Mexico City's Calle Tacuba). The painter Diego Rivera later recalled seeing La Fuente Embriagadora during his childhood.

== Death ==
Petronilo Monroy died in Mexico City on 21 July 1882 from peritonitis.

== Legacy ==
Monroy is considered part of the generation of academic painters who contributed to the development of historical and nationalist imagery in Mexican art during the 19th century.

Several institutions in Tenancingo de Degollado have been named after him, including cultural and educational facilities bearing his name.

In 1992, the writer Luis Mario Schneider published the book José María y Petronilo Monroy: Los Hermanos pintores de Tenancingo, a study of the lives and works of the Monroy brothers.
