= Monroy (surname) =

Monroy is a surname of Spanish origin.

This habitational name derived from Monroy, meaning "red mountain". A place in the Province of Cáceres, Spain.

The Monroe variant has the letter e at the end instead of y, which is a different surname.

== Notables ==
- Carlos Julio Arosemena Monroy (1919–2004), Vice President of Ecuador
- Crispin Castro Monroy (born 1936), Mexican politician
- Fernando Monroy (born 1980), Colombian footballer
- Jordy Monroy (born 1996), Armenian footballer
- Liza Monroy (born 1979), American novelist
- Rafael Monroy (1878–1915), martyr of The Church of Jesus Christ of Latter-day Saints
- Ramiro Ponce Monroy (20th century), Vice President of Guatemala
- Gabriel Alejandro Monroy (Nacido en 1979) Ingeniero Civil.

== See also ==
- Monroe
- de Monroy
- Monro
- Munroe
