= Charles Monroe =

Charles Monroe may refer to:

- Charles Monroe of Battle of Monroe's Crossroads

== See also ==
- Charles Monro (disambiguation)
- Charlie Monroe (1903–1975)
- Charles Munroe
