= De Monroy =

de Monroy is a surname of Spanish origin.

This habitational name derived from de meaning "of" & Monroy, meaning "red mountain". A place in the Province of Cáceres, Spain.

Notable people with the surname include:

- Hernán Cortés de Monroy y Pizarro (1485–1547), Spanish conquistador
- Rodrigo de Monroy y Almaraz, 5th Lord of Monroy (15th century), Spanish nobleman
