= Larry Monroe =

Larry Monroe may refer to:

- Larry Monroe (baseball) (born 1956), an American professional baseball pitcher who played for the Chicago White Sox
- Larry Monroe (radio personality) (1942–2014), an American radio personality who was active in Austin, Texas

== See also ==
- Larry Monroe Boyle (1943–2017), a Justice of the Idaho Supreme Court from 1989 to 1992
- Larry Monroe Forever Bridge, a bridge in Austin, Texas dedicated to the radio personality
