= Mary Monroe =

Mary Monroe may refer to:

- Mary A. Monroe (1860–1953), American teacher and school administrator
- Mary Alice Monroe, American author
- Mary Beth Monroe (1947–2013), American physics educator
- Mary Monroe (author) (born 1949), African-American author

== See also ==
- Mary-Frances Monroe (born 1980), American soccer player
