= Luis Mario Schneider =

Argentine-Mexican writer (1931–1999)

- Born: 12 April 1931; Santo Tomé, Corrientes, Argentina
- Died: 18 January 1999 (aged 67); Tenancingo, Edomex, Mexico
- Occupations: Writer, poet, academic
- Writing career
- Notable awards: Xavier Villaurrutia Prize (1976)

Luis Mario Schneider Zacouteguy (Note: In this name that follows Hispanic American naming customs, the first or paternal surname is Schneider and the second or maternal family name is Zacouteguy.) (12 April 1931 – 18 January 1999) was an academic, poet and writer. Born in Argentina, he emigrated to Mexico and became a naturalised Mexican citizen. His first novel, La resurrección de Clotilde Goñi, won him the 1976 Xavier Villaurrutia Prize.

== Biography ==
Luis Mario Schneider was born in Santo Tomé, in the Argentine province of Corrientes, on 12 April 1931.

He studied humanities at the National University of Córdoba and emigrated to Mexico in 1960, where he completed a doctorate in literature, on stridentism, at the Faculty of Philosophy and Letters (FFyL) of the National Autonomous University of Mexico (UNAM) in 1969. At the UNAM, he worked as a professor of Mexican and Hispanic American literature. He also taught at the Ibero-American University (UIA), the Universidad Veracruzana (UV) and El Colegio de México, as well as at Rutgers University in the United States. In 1980 he was appointed as a researcher at the UNAM's Institute of Bibliographic Research; he also served as a member of the editorial board of the magazine La Palabra y el Hombre and was the editor of Amatlacuilo, to which he also contributed. He was admitted to the Sistema Nacional de Investigadores (SNI) in 1985.

Schneider died on 18 January 1999 in Tenancingo, State of Mexico, at the age of 67. (Note: Other sources say he died in nearby Malinalco.)

== Works ==
Schneider published over 30 books and numerous other publications. His columns were also published in numerous newspapers and periodicals, including the Revista de la Universidad de México, El Universal, El Sol de México, Siempre! and Unomásuno.

=== Novels ===
- La resurrección de Clotilde Goñi, Joaquín Mortiz, 1977.
- Refugio, Joaquín Mortiz, 1996.

=== Short stories ===
- Cuentos del amor infinito, Instituto Mexiquense de Cultura, 1999.

=== Poetry ===
- Valparaíso, Pájaro Cascabel, 1963.
- Memoria de la piel, Ediciones del Puente, 1965.
- Arponero del fuego, Las Américas Publishing, 1967.
- La semilla en la herida, UNAM, 1995.

=== Biography ===
- Abraham Ángel, Instituto Mexiquense de Cultura, 1995. The life of the painter Abraham Ángel.
- José María y Petronilo Monroy. Los hermanos pintores de Tenancingo, Instituto Mexiquense de Cultura, 1992. About the painters José María and Petronilo Monroy.

== Awards and recognitions ==
- 1977: The Xavier Villaurrutia Prize for La resurrección de Clotilde Goñi.
- 1992: The Luis Cardoza y Aragón Art Criticism Award, awarded by the National Council for Culture and Arts (CNCA), for José María y Petronilo Monroy. Los hermanos pintores de Tenancingo.
- 1996: The State of Mexico's Sor Juana Inés de la Cruz Award for Arts and Letters.

== Legacy ==
=== Dr. Luis Mario Schneider Museum and Luis Mario Schneider Cultural Centre ===
Schneider bequeathed his home, his 17,000-volume library and a plot of land in Malinalco, State of Mexico, to the Autonomous University of the State of Mexico (UAEM). The house, Finca El Olvido, was turned into the Luis Mario Schneider Cultural Centre.

On the vacant plot to the west of the town square, the UAEM built its first off-campus museum, dedicated to promoting the area's natural and cultural wealth. The museum was designed in collaboration with the Malinalco municipal government, the State of Mexico Cultural Institute and the National Institute of Anthropology and History's Centre for the State of Mexico, and was opened to the public on 18 May 2001. It contains seven galleries dealing with the geography, mythology and history of Malinalco and temporary exhibitions.The permanent collection is divided into exhibitions on festivals, the rainy season, the geological strata of the area, the underworld, the dry season and the neighbouring archaeological site, including a replica of the site's House of the Eagle Warriors, the cuauhcalli (the original at the archaeological site is closed to visitors).

In 2002, the museum received the Miguel Covarrubias Prize, which is awarded by the National Institute of Anthropology and History (INAH) in recognition of the best public museum project.
