= Simon Monroe =

Simon Monroe may refer to:

- Simon Monroe, namesake of Monroe, Oklahoma
- Simon Monroe, character in In the Flesh (TV series)
