= Mary Beth Monroe =

American physics educator

Mary Beth Todd Monroe (November 15, 1947 – August 27, 2013) was an American physics educator, the president-elect of the American Association of Physics Teachers and a professor of physics at Southwest Texas Junior College.

== Education and career ==
Monroe majored in physics at Sam Houston State University, graduating in 1970. She became a secondary-school physics teacher while continuing to study laser science with Charles Manka at Sam Houston State, earning a master's degree in 1973.

She became a faculty member at the University of Texas–Pan American in 1973, and in 1974 moved to Southwest Texas Junior College, where she remained until retiring in 2012; throughout this time, she was the only physicist on the college's faculty.

She died of cancer in Reagan Wells, Texas on August 27, 2013.

== Contributions ==
Monroe was the principal investigator of multiple national projects on the reform of physics education at two-year colleges, and in 2002 organized a conference on physics teacher education.

She was an active member of the American Association of Physics Teachers beginning when she was a student, and began national service in the association in 1979. She was elected in 2011 as a future president of the American Association of Physics Teachers, but died as president-elect before she could serve her term. She also helped found a chapter of the Society of Physics Students at her college, in 1975.

== Recognition ==
The American Association of Physics Teachers gave Monroe a Distinguished Service Citation in 1998, and the Melba Newell Phillips Medal in 2010. The Texas Section of the association gave her the Robert N. Little Award in 2003.

In 2004 she was elected as a Fellow of the American Physical Society (APS), after a nomination from the APS Forum on Education, "for her national leadership and service to the American Physical Society, the American Association of Physics Teachers, and the Two Year College project and for fostering professional identity among two-year college physics teachers".
