= Tom Monroe =

Tom Monroe may refer to:

- Tom Monroe (disc golfer) (born 1947), American disc golfer
- Tom Monroe (actor) (1919–1993), American actor

== See also ==
- Thomas Monroe (disambiguation)
