= Thomas Monroe =

Thomas Monroe may refer to:

- Thomas Bell Monroe (1791–1865), American federal judge
- Thomas Monroe (American football), American football player
- Thomas Monroe (writer) (1902–1960), American screenwriter

== See also ==
- Tom Monroe (disambiguation)
