= Frank Munro (Australian footballer) =

Australian rules footballer

Personal information
- Full name: Frank Munro
- Born: 27 April 1934
- Died: 20 January 2011 (aged 76)
- Height: 178 cm (5 ft 10 in)
- Weight: 76 kg (168 lb)

Playing career^{1}
Years	Club	Games (Goals)
1954–56	Carlton	14 (3)
1956–57	Richmond	13 (0)
Total		27 (3)
- ^{1} Playing statistics correct to the end of 1957.

Frank Munro (27 April 1934 – 20 January 2011) was an Australian rules footballer who played with Carlton and Richmond in the Victorian Football League (VFL).
