= Rodrigo de Monroy y Almaraz, 5th Lord of Monroy =

Rodrigo de Monroy y Almaraz, 5th Lord of Monroy, was a Spanish nobleman and Feudal Lord, son of Hernán de Monroy y Rodríguez de las Varillas, 4th Lord of Monroy, and wife Isabel de Almaraz, Lady of Almaraz.

He married Mencía de Orellana y Carvajal, daughter of Hernándo Alfonso de Orellana (a distant relative of Francisco de Orellana), and wife Juana González de Carvajal, and had at least:

- Hernán Rodríguez de Monroy y Orellana, el Bezudo, 6th Lord of Monroy, married and had issue
- Rodrigo (sometimes called Ruy) Fernández de Monroy y Orellana, married to María Cortés, daughter of Diego de la Cueva, Alcalde of Caltinovo (a relative of Beltrán de la Cueva) and wife María Cortés, and had:
  - Martín Cortés de Monroy (b. 1449), an Infantry Captain of distinguished ancestry but slender means, married to Catalina Pizarro y Altamirano, daughter of Diego Altamirano and wife and cousin Leonor Sánchez Pizarro y Altamirano, and had:
    - Hernán Cortés de Monroy y Pizarro, 1st Marquess of the Valley of Oaxaca (1485–1547), the Conquistador of the Aztec Empire

== Sources ==
- Cunha, Fernando de Castro Pereira Mouzinho de Albuquerque e (1906–1998), Instrumentário Genealógico – Linhagens Milenárias. MCMXCV, pp. 310–1
- Instituto de Salazar y Castro, Elenco de Grandezas y Titulos Nobiliarios Españoles. Various (periodic publication)
- Machado, J. T. Montalvão, Dos Pizarros de Espanha aos de Portugal e Brasil. Author's Edition, 1st Edition. Lisbon, 1970, pp. 20 and 47 – Arv. 1
- Genealogy of Hernán Cortés
- Origin of the Surname Cortés
- Origin of Vázquez de Coronado Family
- Genealogy
