= Charles Edward Munroe =

American chemist

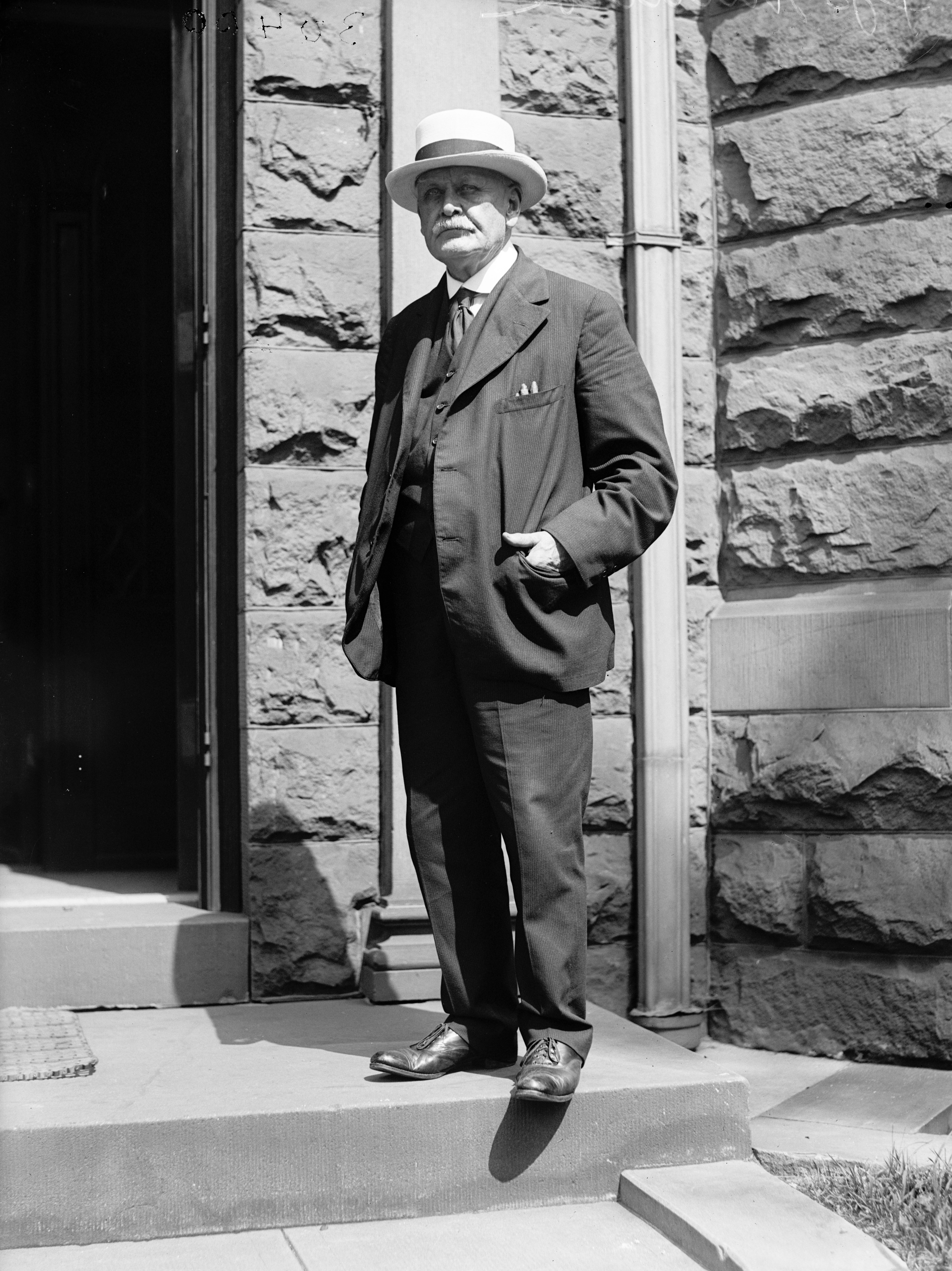
Charles Edward Munroe in 1919

Charles Edward Munroe (May 24, 1849 – December 7, 1938) was an American chemist, discoverer of the Munroe effect, and chair of the department of chemistry at the George Washington University.

He was born in Cambridge, Massachusetts and studied at the Lawrence scientific school of Harvard, graduating in 1871. He then took a job as an assistant professor of chemistry at the college until 1874, when he moved to Annapolis to become a professor of chemistry at the United States Naval Academy.

In 1886, he joined the Naval Torpedo Station and War College at Newport, Rhode Island as a chemist, where he discovered the Munroe effect, the basis for explosive shaped charges. From 1892–1917 Munroe was head of the department of chemistry and dean of the Corcoran Scientific School at the Columbian University (renamed George Washington University in 1904). During the same time period, he was also the dean of the faculty of graduate studies and earned a Ph.D. in 1894 and LL.D in 1912 from the university. In 1898, he aided in the investigation of the 1898 Capitol Gas Explosion, serving as an explosives expert to determine the cause of the accident. In 1919 he became dean emeritus of the school of graduate studies and professor emeritus of chemistry, roles he kept until he died. He wrote over 100 books on explosives and chemistry, and was appointed in 1900 by the Swedish Academy of Science to nominate the candidate for the Nobel Prize in chemistry. In addition, Munroe served as president of the American Chemical Society in 1898 (of which he was also a founding member) and as a consultant to the United States Geological Survey and the United States Bureau of Mines. He was an elected member of both the American Philosophical Society and the American Academy of Arts and Sciences.

https://babel.hathitrust.org/cgi/pt?id=mdp.39015073425533&view=1up&seq=5&q1=munroe
