= Frank Monroe (baseball) =

American baseball player (1855–1908)

- Catcher/Outfielder
- Born: c. 1855; Hamilton, Ohio
- Died: July 2, 1908 (aged 52–53); Great Falls, Montana
- Batted: Unknown Threw: Unknown

MLB debut
- July 18, 1884, for the Indianapolis Hoosiers

Last MLB appearance
- July 20, 1884, for the Indianapolis Hoosiers

MLB statistics
- Batting average: .000
- Home runs: 0
- Runs batted in: 0

Teams
- Indianapolis Hoosiers (1884)

Frank W. Monroe (c. 1855 – July 2, 1908) was a Major League Baseball player, who played in two games for the 1884 Indianapolis Hoosiers. He played catcher in one game and outfielder in the other. He was hitless in eight at-bats in the two games. He played for the Chattanooga Lookouts in the Southern League in 1885.
