= Larry Monroe (baseball) =

American baseball pitcher (born 1956)

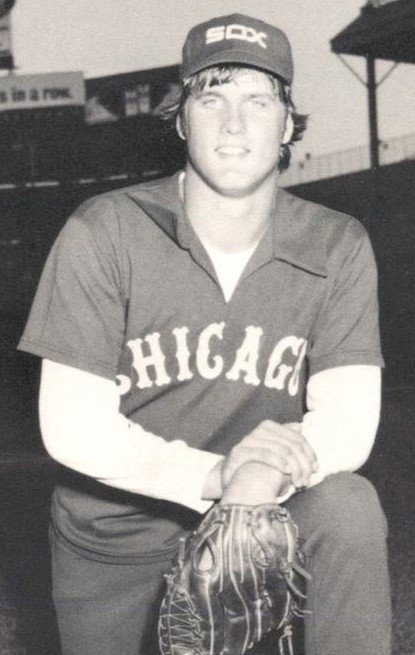
- Pitcher
- Born: June 20, 1956 (age 70); Detroit, Michigan, U.S.
- Batted: Right Threw: Right

MLB debut
- August 23, 1976, for the Chicago White Sox

Last MLB appearance
- September 30, 1976, for the Chicago White Sox

MLB statistics
- Win–loss record: 0-1
- Earned run average: 4.15
- Strikeouts: 9
- Stats at Baseball Reference

Teams
- Chicago White Sox (1976)

Lawrence James Monroe (born June 20, 1956) is an American former professional baseball pitcher, who played in Major League Baseball (MLB) for the Chicago White Sox in 1976.

== Biography ==
Monroe was chosen by the Sox in the first round of the 1974 Major League Baseball draft with the eighth overall selection. After going 11-14 with a 2.91 ERA for the Knoxville Sox in 1976, he earned a late-season call-up to Chicago. He made his big league debut on August 23 against the Detroit Tigers, throwing two scoreless, hitless innings of relief. He earned his only decision in the majors on September 30. He started that day's game against the California Angels, going five innings, giving up six hits and four runs (three earned), and walking two to take the loss. Returning to Knoxville in 1977, he continued to play through 1979.

After his playing days, Monroe worked for the White Sox in various capacities. When Adrian Garrett replaced Vern Law as manager of the Denver Zephyrs in 1984, Monroe was brought in to become pitching coach. He was vice president of scouting and minor league operations from 1990 to 1994 and was vice president of free agent and major league scouting from that time until 2000. Monroe was an integral part of the advanced scouting team, which aided the Chicago White Sox in winning the 2005 World Series. More recently, he was an advisor to the baseball department through 2020.

Currently Monroe runs the personal pitching training business, Monroe Pitching, geared to young men looking to improve their individual talents.

Monroe is the author of Best-Kept Secrets of Major League Pitching. Monroe's son, Grant Monroe, was drafted by the Chicago White Sox in the 38th round of the 2007 amateur draft and again in the 46th round of the 2009 amateur draft.
