= Mike Monroe =

Mike or Michael Monroe may refer to:

== People ==
- Mike Monroe (trade unionist), known as "A.L. Monroe" (born 1931), American labor union leader
- Michael E. Monroe, trade unionist and son of the above
- Michael Monroe (born 1962), musician, member of Hanoi Rocks

== Fictional characters ==
- Mike Monroe, a character in the 1952 film Because of You
- Mike Monroe, a fictional character in Northern Exposure
- Michael Monroe, protagonist in the novel SOS Adventures

== See also ==
- Mike Munro (born 1953), Australian TV presenter
