= Emilio Ambasz =

Argentinian architect

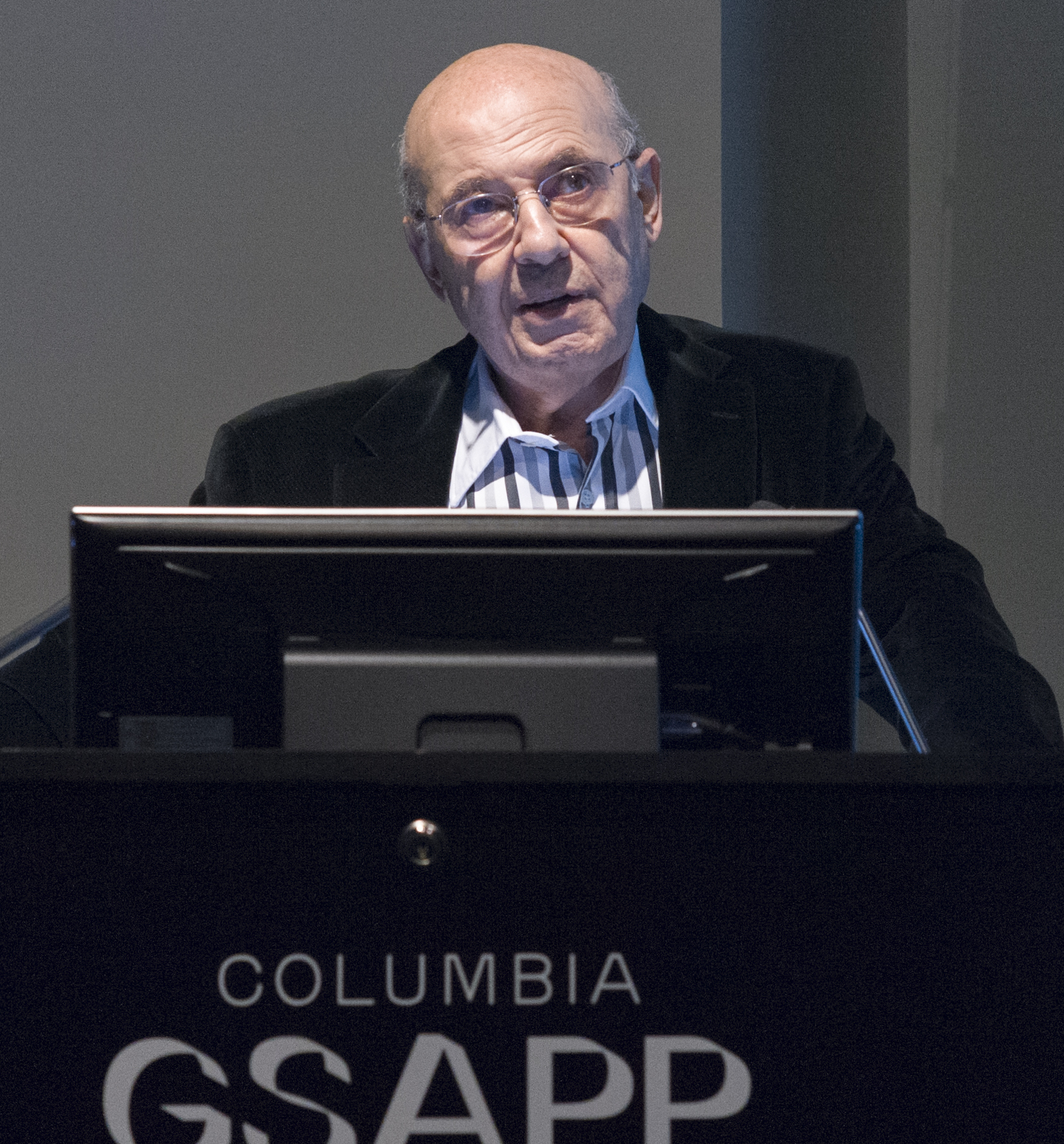
- Ambasz speaking at the Columbia Graduate School of Architecture, Planning and Preservation (2016)
- Born: 13 June 1943 (age 83)
- Occupations: Architect, designer, industrial designer
- Website: www.ambasz.com

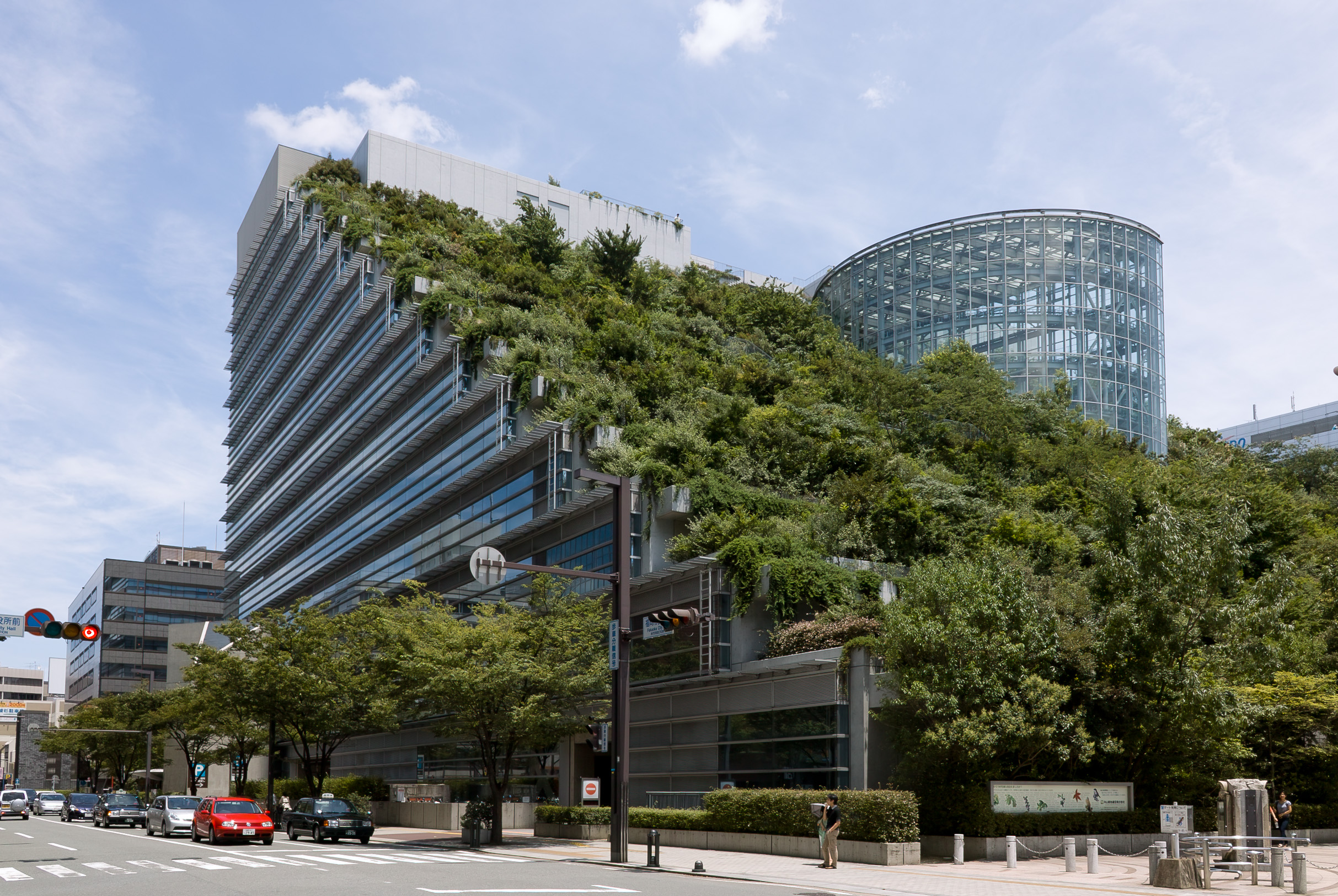
ACROS building with roof garden, Fukuoka, Japan (1995)

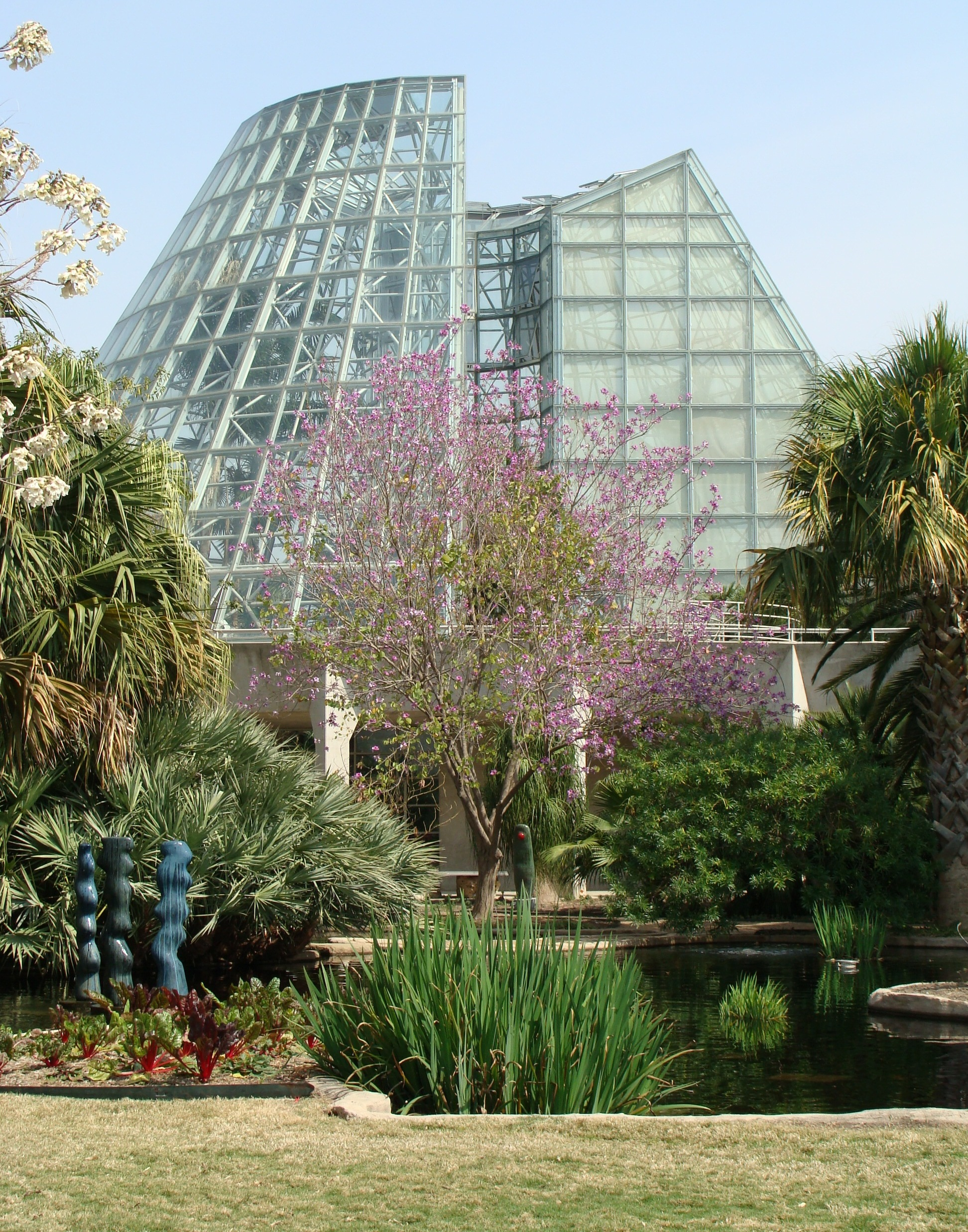
Lucile Halsell Conservatory, San Antonio Botanical Garden (1988)

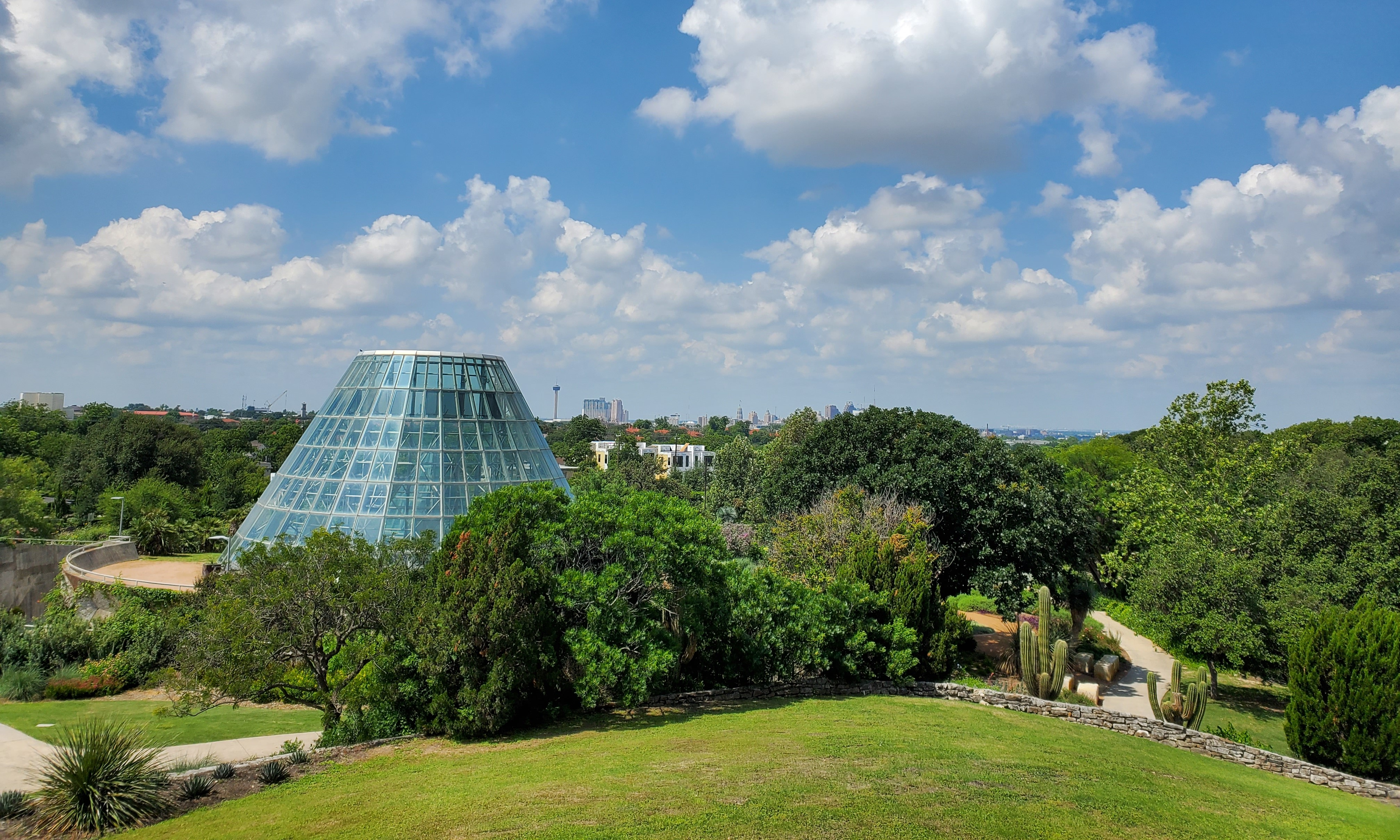
San Antonio Botanical Garden

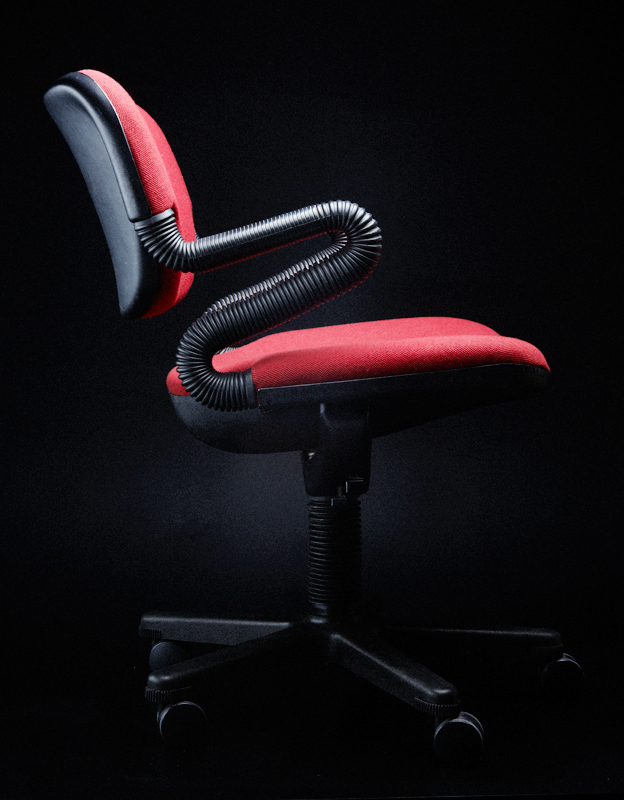
Vertebra Chair Emilio Ambasz Krueger

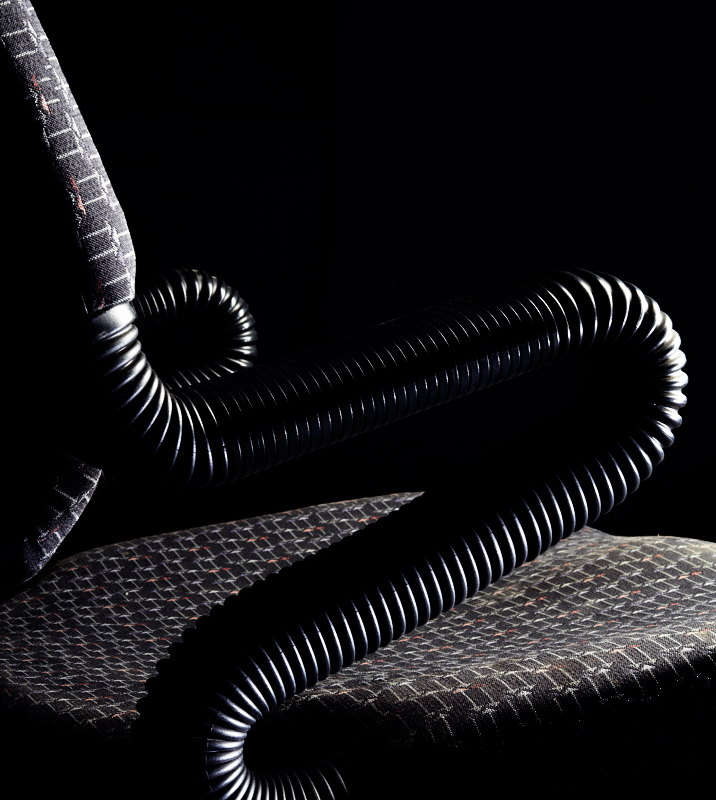
Vertebra Chair Emilio Ambasz

Emilio Ambasz (born 1943) is an Argentinian-American architect and industrial designer. From 1968 to 1970 he was an Associate Curator at the Museum of Modern Art (MoMA) Department of Architecture and Design under the direction of Arthur Drexler, and was subsequently appointed as curator of that department, a role in which he served until 1976. While at MoMA he established the Latin American Industrial Design Project with MoMA's International Council, and also developed the Museum's new Program on Environmental Design.

Ambasz's work seeks to merge the natural and artificial, and to propose alternatives to current trends. As he puts it: "It is an ethical obligation to demonstrate that another future is possible. To affirm a different model of life to avoid perpetuating the present." As such, Ambasz has been called "the father, poet, and prophet" of green architecture by Japanese architect Tadao Ando, since his style is characterised by a combination of buildings and gardens which Ambasz describes as "green over grey". Defying the architectural trends of the 1970s, he often hides his buildings under gardens and grass or puts them on boats. According to curator Terence Riley, Ambasz's work reconciles "technology and primitivism" while Italian architect Alessandro Mendini characterized him as the "creator of sophisticated earthly paradises."

== Birth and education ==
Emilio Ambasz was born in Argentina on 13 June 1943, in Resistencia, Chaco, and is also a citizen of Spain by Royal Grant. He received his bachelor's and master's degrees in architecture within two years at Princeton University, and even though Ambasz was briefly his student, Kenneth Frampton remarked: "but I hardly can [say that] ... there wasn't very much I could contribute".

== Award-winning architecture ==
Among Ambaz's many architectural projects are the Grand Rapids Art Museum in Michigan, winner of the 1976 Progressive Architecture Award; a house for a couple in Cordoba, Spain, winner of the 1980 Progressive Architecture Award; and the Conservatory at the San Antonio Botanical Center in Texas, winner of the 1985 Progressive Architecture Award, the 1988 National Glass Association Award for Excellence in Commercial Design, and the 1990 Quaternario Award.

The headquarters he designed for the Financial Guaranty Insurance Company of New York won the Grand Prize of the 1987 International Interior Design Award of the United Kingdom, as well as the 1986 IDEA Award from the Industrial Designers Society of America. He won first prize in the 1986 competition for the urban plan for the Eschenheimer Tower in Frankfurt, Germany, and his Banque Bruxelles Lambert in Milan received the 1983 Annual Interiors Award. He also won the First Prize and Gold Medal ex aequo in the competition to design the Master Plan for the Universal Exhibition of 1992, which celebrated the 500th anniversary of America's discovery and took place in Seville, Spain.

== Industrial design ==
Ambasz served as Curator of Design at MoMA from 1969 to 1976, where he directed and installed numerous exhibits on architecture and industrial design, among them Italy: The New Domestic Landscape in 1972; The Architecture of Luis Barragan in 1974; and The Taxi Project in 1976. He also authored these exhibitions' publications.

He himself holds over 220 industrial and mechanical design patents, from high-efficiency engines to modular furniture, streetlamps to interior spotlights, flexible pens to expandable briefcases, ergonomic handles to wrist computers, sinuous water containers to folding notebooks, as well as dental hygiene systems, billfold TVs, accessories, and watercolor sets. From 1980 to 2008 he was Chief Design Consultant for the Cummins Engine Co.

Ambasz's inventions in the world of seating are fundamental, and include the Qualis chair, which won the 1991 Compasso d'Oro; the Stacker chair, which won the Gold Award at the 2003 International Forum for Design; and the Vertebra chair, the world's first automatic ergonomic chair which he developed with G. Piretti in 1975 and which won the 1981 Compasso d'Oro prize as well as numerous other awards worldwide. The Vertebra is in the permanent collections of MoMA and the Metropolitan Museum in New York, and MoMA's Design Collection also includes his 1967 3-D Poster Geigy Graphics and his Flashlight , among more than 20 other pieces of his.

== Key exhibitions and publications ==
In the winter of 2011–12, Ambasz's architectural, industrial, and graphic design work was exhibited at the Museo Nacional Centro de Arte Reina Sofía, Madrid, in a comprehensive major retrospective of his complete works. In 2017, Lars Mueller Publishers issued a much improved English version of the book of that exhibition, entitled Emerging Nature: Precursor of Architecture and Design.

Ambasz is himself the author of several books on architecture and design, among them Natural Architecture, Artificial Design, first published by Electa in 2001 and republished four times since in expanded versions. However, in 2017 Ambasz said that: "I detest writing theories. I prefer writing fables", and Domus magazine has published some of his fables.

As an initiator of the debate on the relationship between humans and the environment, Ambasz was recently the protagonist of the 150-piece Emerging Ecologies exhibition, the first to examine the relationship between architecture and the environmental movement in the United States, organized by MoMA in New York.

== Honours ==
Ambasz taught at Princeton University's School of Architecture and was a visiting professor at the Hochschule für Gestaltung in Ulm, Germany. He was a two-term president of the Architectural League from 1981 to 1985, and the American Institute of Architects admitted him to Honorary Fellowship in recognition of his distinguished achievement in the profession of architecture in May 2007. He is also an Honorary International Fellow of the Royal Institute of British Architects.

In June 2021, Ambasz was awarded an honorary degree in building engineering and architecture by the University of Bologna in Italy as a "trailblazer" for green architecture. In September 2020, he won his fourth Compasso d'Oro for his outstanding career "as a pioneer of the relationship between buildings and nature." Ambasz had represented the United States at the 1976 Venice Biennale, and in 2021 the Italian Pavilion at the Biennale paid tribute to Ambasz's creations as an inspiration for modern-era sustainable architecture.

In 2020, MoMA established the Emilio Ambasz Institute for the Joint Study of the Built and the Natural Environment, with curator, writer, and educator Carson Chan appointed as its first director.

== Exhibitions of works ==
- 1983 Emilio Ambasz: 10 Years of Architecture, Graphic and Industrial Design, a circulating show presented in Milan, Madrid, and Zurich
- 1985 Emilio Ambasz, The Axis Design and Architecture Gallery, Tokyo
- 1986 Emilio Ambasz, Institute of Contemporary Art of Geneva at HaIle Sud, Switzerland
- 1987 Emilio Ambasz, Arc-en- Ciel Gallery at the Center of Contemporary Art, Bordeaux, France
- 1989 Emilio Ambasz: Architecture, one-man show at The Museum of Modern Art, New York
- 1989 Emilio Ambasz: Architecture, Exhibition, Industrial and Graphic Design, a circulating one man show presented in San Diego Museum of Contemporary Art, the Musée des Arts Décoratifs de Montreal, the Akron Art Museum in Ohio, the Art Institute of Chicago in Illinois, and the Laumeier Sculpture Park in St. Louis
- 1993 Emilio Ambasz, one-man show, Tokyo Station Contemporary Center, Japan
- 1994 Emilio Ambasz, Architecture and Design, one-man show at the Centro Cultural Arte Contemporáneo in Mexico City.
- 2005–2006 In-Depth: The House of Spiritual Retreat by Emilio Ambasz, at The Museum of Modern Art, New York.
- 2009 In Situ:Architecture and Landscape, a group show at The Museum of Modern Art, New York
- 2010 Green over Gray, one-man show at the Grimaldi Forum, Monaco
- 2011–2012 Emilio Ambasz: Inventions – Architecture and Design; a comprehensive major retrospective, at the Centro Nacional de Arte Contemporáneo Reina Sofia, Madrid, Spain

== Publications by Ambasz ==
- 1972 Ambasz, Emilio, ed.: Italy: The New Domestic Landscape: Achievements and Problems of Italian Design. The Museum of Modern Art, New York.
- 1976 Ambasz, Emilio, ed.: The Taxi Project: Realistic Solutions for Today. The Museum of Modern Art, New York.
- 1976 Ambasz, Emilio: The architecture of Luis Barragàn. The Museum of Modern Art, New York.
- 1999 Ambasz, Emilio: Shigeru Ban. Lawrence King Publishing, London.
- 2004 Ambasz, Emilio: Analyzing Ambasz. The Monacelli Press, New York.
- 2006 Ambasz, Emilio, ed.: The Universitas Project: Solutions for a Post-Technological Society. The Museum of Modern Art, New York.

== Publications about Ambasz ==
- 1989 Emilio Ambasz: The Poetics of the Pragmatic: Architecture, Exhibit, Industrial and Graphic Design. Rizzoli International Publications, New York.
- 1993 Emilio Ambasz: Inventions: The Reality of the Ideal. Rizzoli International Publications, New York.
- 1999 Architettura e Natura: Emilio Ambasz – Progetti & Oggetti. Electa, Milan
- 2001 Emilio Ambasz: Natural Architecture, Artificial Design. Electa, Milan.
- 2005 Emilio Ambasz: A Technological Arcadia, by Fulvio Irace. Electa, Milan.
- 2005 Emilio Ambasz: Casa de Retiro Espiritual, by Peter Buchanan and Michele Alassio. Electa, Milan.
- 2010 Emilio Ambasz: Architecture & Nature, Design & Artifice / Architecture & Nature, Design & Artifice. Electa Mondador, Milan.
- 2011 Emilio Ambasz. Invenciones: arquitectura y diseño. Museo Reina Sofía, Madrid.
- 2011 Maestros de la Arquitectura. Emilio Ambasz, by Mónica Colombo. Editorial Salvat, Barcelona.
- 2017 Emerging Nature – Emilio Ambasz: Precursor of Architecture and Design, Lars Muller Publishers, Zurich, Switzerland.
- 2021 Emilio Ambasz: Green Architecture & Design Tales / Architettura verde & favole di design, curated by Fulvio Irace. Corraini Edizione, Mantova.
- 2022 Emilio Ambasz: Curating a New Nature, by Barry Bergdoll. Rizzoli, New York.
