= Jimmy Williams (unionist) =

American labor union leader

21st General President of IUPAT
- Incumbent
- Assumed office September 1, 2021
- Preceded by: Ken Rigmaiden

Personal details
- Born: 1977 or 1978 (age 48–49) Philadelphia, Pennsylvania, U.S.

James A. Williams Jr. (born 1977 or 1978) is an American labor union leader who is currently the General President of the International Union of Painters and Allied Trades.

== Biography ==
Williams grew up in Philadelphia, Pennsylvania and followed his father in becoming a glazier. In 1998, he joined the International Union of Painters and Allied Trades. His father, James Williams, was appointed as president of the union in 2003, and selected Jimmy as his assistant. He also became the union's organizing coordinator for the eastern region.

In 2011, Williams was appointed as the union's organizing director, and then in 2014 as general vice president at large.

In 2021, Williams was elected as president of the union. Aged 43, he was its youngest ever president, and the youngest president of any AFL-CIO affiliate at the time.

He was also elected as a vice-president of the AFL-CIO. As president, he stated that he would focus on organizing workers, particularly immigrants and workers in the American South, and lobby for the passage of the Protecting the Right to Organize Act.

Trade union offices
Preceded by Ken Rigmaiden	President of the International Union of Painters and Allied Trades; 2021–present	Succeeded by Incumbent
