= James Williams (labor leader) =

American labor leader

James A. Williams
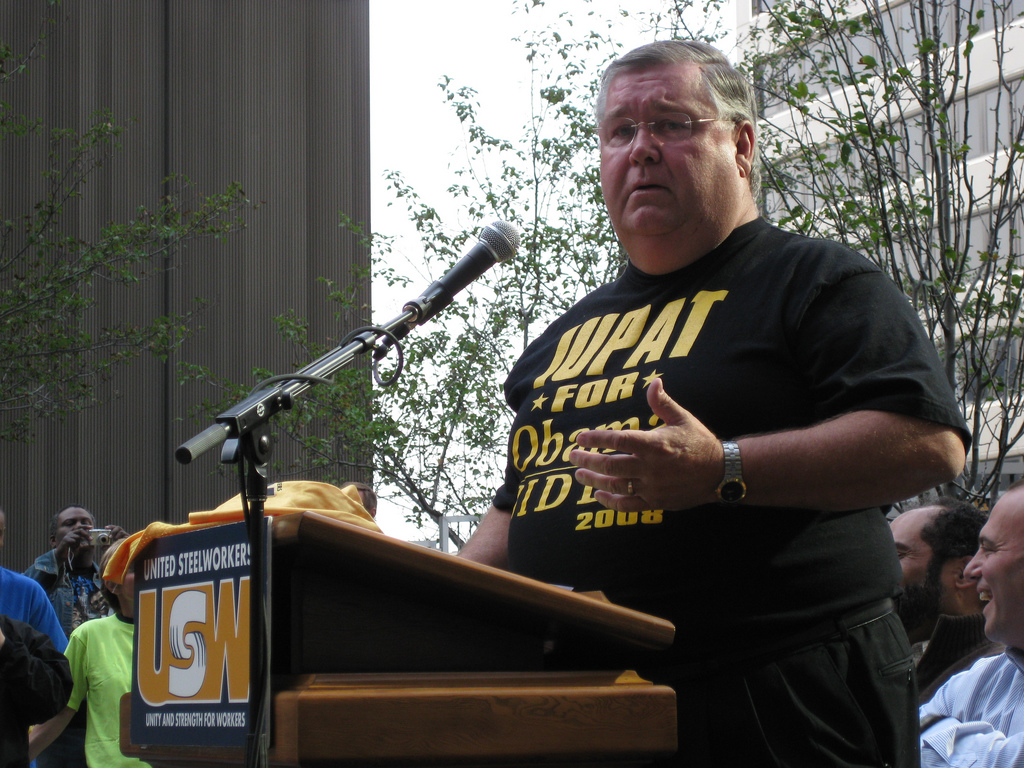
- Williams at a rally for Obama in 2008

James A. Williams Sr. (born 1951) is an American labor leader. After serving in the U.S. Army, Williams worked his way into politics and labor unions. He served in positions in Local Union 252 and on boards of various unions and companies. Williams is the former president of the International Union of Painters and Allied Trades (IUPAT), which he led from 2003-2013.

== Early life and career ==
Williams grew up in North Philadelphia and Kensington, Pennsylvania. He graduated from Northeast Catholic High School in Philadelphia in 1968. Following his high school graduation, Williams embarked on his professional journey as an apprentice with Glaziers, Architectural Metal and Glass Workers Local Union 252 in Philadelphia. He then served in the United States Army from 1969 to 1971 during the Vietnam War. Upon returning home in 1971, he completed his apprenticeship and worked as a skilled journeyman glazier. Williams later accomplished a significant personal milestone by completing his college degree in 2004.

== Family ==
Williams is part of a family with long-standing involvement with union work. Williams' grandfather worked as a union housepainter. Similarly, Williams’ great-grandfather and father were both union glaziers. Additionally, his son, Jimmy Williams, became president of IUPAT in 2021.

== Labor Union career ==
In 1975, Williams was elected as the president and business manager of Local Union 252. He held this position while co-chairing their Pension, Annuity, Health & Welfare, and Vacation Funds, and he also served on numerous boards, including a position on the Philadelphia Private Industry Council.

Williams served from August 1994 – 1999 as the Allied Region General Vice President of the International Union of Painters and Allied Trades (IUPAT), a prominent labor organization with over 140,000 members in the construction industry across the United States and Canada. Williams was then elected as the General Secretary-Treasurer of IUPAT, where he served as a trustee on multiple pension funds. For example, he played a major role on the IUPAT Local Union and District Council Pension Fund, IUPAT Industry Pension Fund, and the IUPAT General Officers, Staff, and Employees Retirement and Pension Fund.

In April 2003, he was unanimously elected as the general president of the IUPAT by the union's General Executive Board. As president of IUPAT, Williams salary increased significantly, earning a top 15 wage for union leaders across the United States at the time. On June 8, 2005, he was elected as a member of the Board of Trustees of the AFL-CIO Housing Investment Trust and the Advisory Board of the AFL-CIO Building Investment Trust. Williams retired as the president of IUPAT on April 1, 2013, replaced by IUPAT Executive General Vice President Ken Rigmaiden.

=== Relationship with Howard Dean ===
Williams had a strong relationship with politician Howard Dean during his presidential campaign in 2004, advocating for him in multiple rallies. At the time, Dean was the governor of Vermont. As president of IUPAT, Williams introduced Governor Dean in his address to union members, where he discussed a range of topics including the domestic policies of the George W. Bush administration and employment concerns.

== Notable achievements ==
After serving in the U.S. Army, James Williams was awarded two Bronze Stars, the Army Accommodation Medal, and an Air Medal. Williams also received the Vietnam Veterans Labor Leader of Year award in 1992.

Trade union offices
| Preceded by Walter G. Raftery | Secretary-Treasurer of the International Union of Painters and Allied Trades; 1995–2003 | Succeeded by George Galis |
| Preceded by Michael E. Monroe | President of the International Union of Painters and Allied Trades; 2003–2013 | Succeeded by Ken Rigmaiden |
