= San Antonio Botanical Garden =

Public gardens in San Antonio, Texas, United States

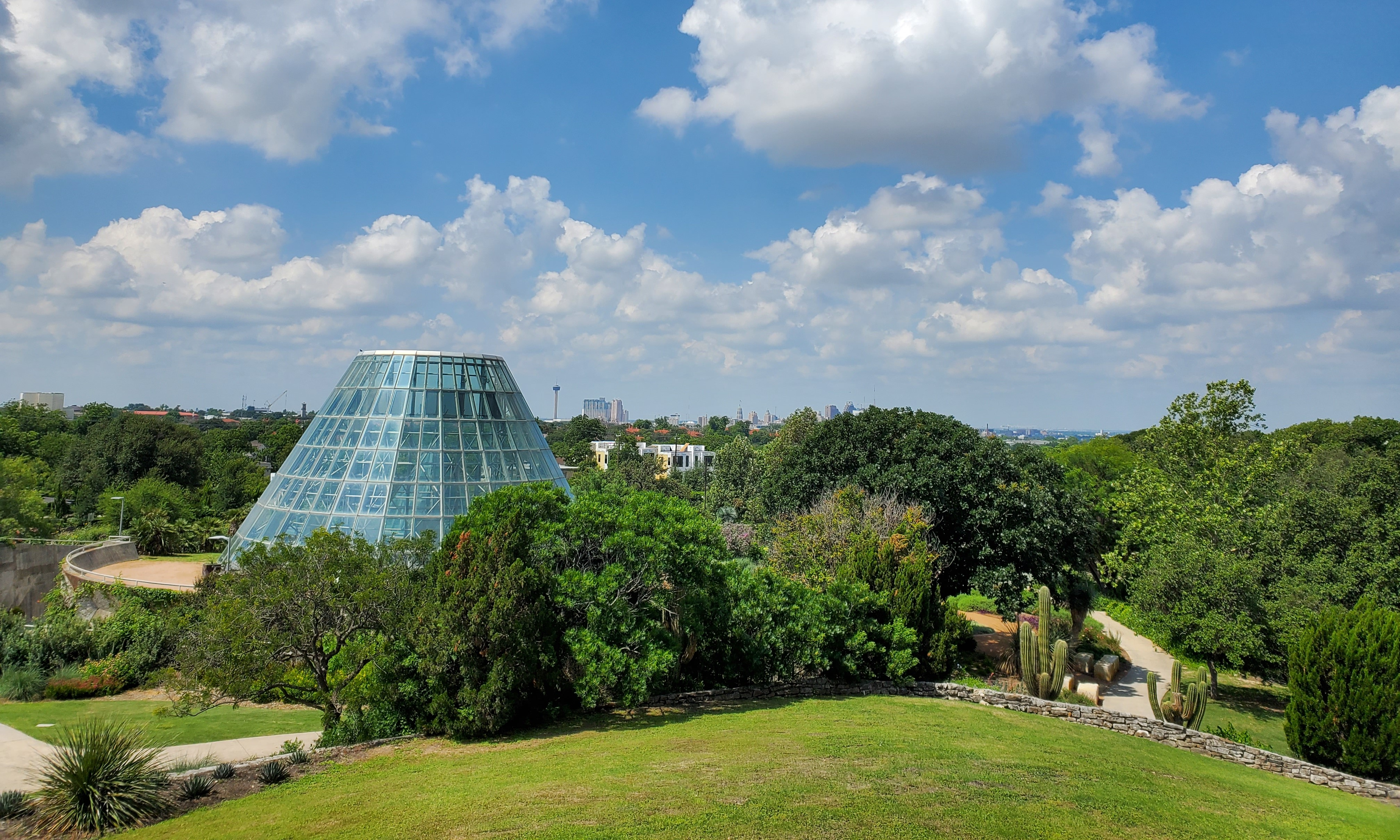
- View from the highest point in the San Antonio Botanical Garden with Downtown San Antonio in the distance

- Location within Texas Location within the United States
- Type: Botanical garden
- Location: 555 Funston Place; San Antonio, Texas 78209
- Coordinates: 29.4589°N 98.4571°W
- Area: 41 acres (17 ha)
- Opened: May 3, 1980
- Manager: John Troy
- Visitors: 400,000
- Status: Open year round
- Website: sabgtx.org

The San Antonio Botanical Garden is a 39-acre (16 ha), non-profit botanical garden in San Antonio, Texas, United States, and the city's official botanical garden. The garden is situated on one of the highest points within San Antonio city limits, sitting at around 798 ft (243.2 m)

== History ==
The Garden was first conceived in the 1940s by Mrs. R. R. Witt and Mrs. Joseph Murphy, who organized the San Antonio Garden Center. The two went on to develop a master plan for a city botanical center in the late 1960's. The site of the master plan was a former limestone quarry and waterworks area owned by the city. Voters approved $265,000 in bonds in 1970, which was the catalyst for funding the new gardens. Ground was broken for the new facilities on July 21, 1976, and the San Antonio Botanical Gardens officially opened to the public on May 3, 1980.

The Garden has had two major additions since opening. On February 29, 1988 the Emilio Ambasz designed Lucile Halsell Conservatory opened to the public and later that same year the historic Sullivan Carriage House was moved brick by brick to the Garden. Restoration of the building began in 1992 with formal dedication in 1995. In 2017 with support from its $40 million GROW capital campaign, the Garden expanded eight acres. Complementing the existing Garden through a new entrance experience, a culinary garden and outdoor kitchen for teaching health and wellness, and a family adventure garden promoting nature play.

== Features ==
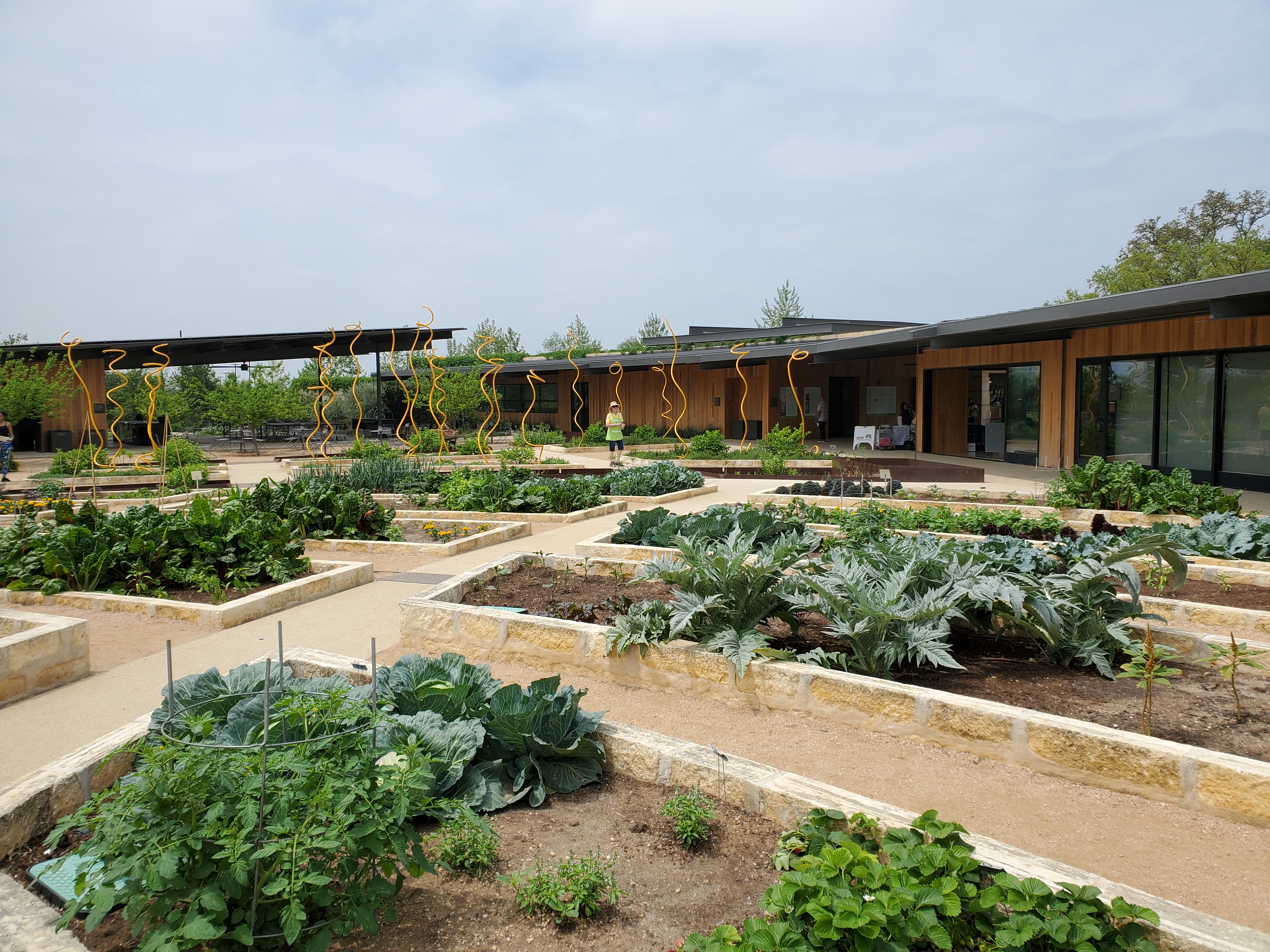
The Zachry Foundation Culinary Garden.

Today the garden consists of the Lucile Halsell Conservatory, formal and display gardens, native gardens, an overlook tower and the Sullivan Carriage House:

- Lucile Halsell Conservatory (1988) - Designed by award-winning, Argentinian architect Emilio Ambasz this subterranean structure consists of five climate specific greenhouses surrounding a central courtyard. Specimens housed in the structure include alpine plants, aquatic plants, cacti and succulents, carnivorous plants, epiphytes, ferns and aroids, tropical fruits, and palms and cycads. The building won several architectural design awards.
- Gardens - Mays Family Display Garden, The Zachry Foundation Culinary Garden, Sensory Garden, Kumamoto En, Rose and Old Fashioned Garden, Sacred Garden, Cactus and Succulent Garden, Children's Vegetable Garden, Family Adventure Garden, Watersaver Garden, and Wisteria Arbor.

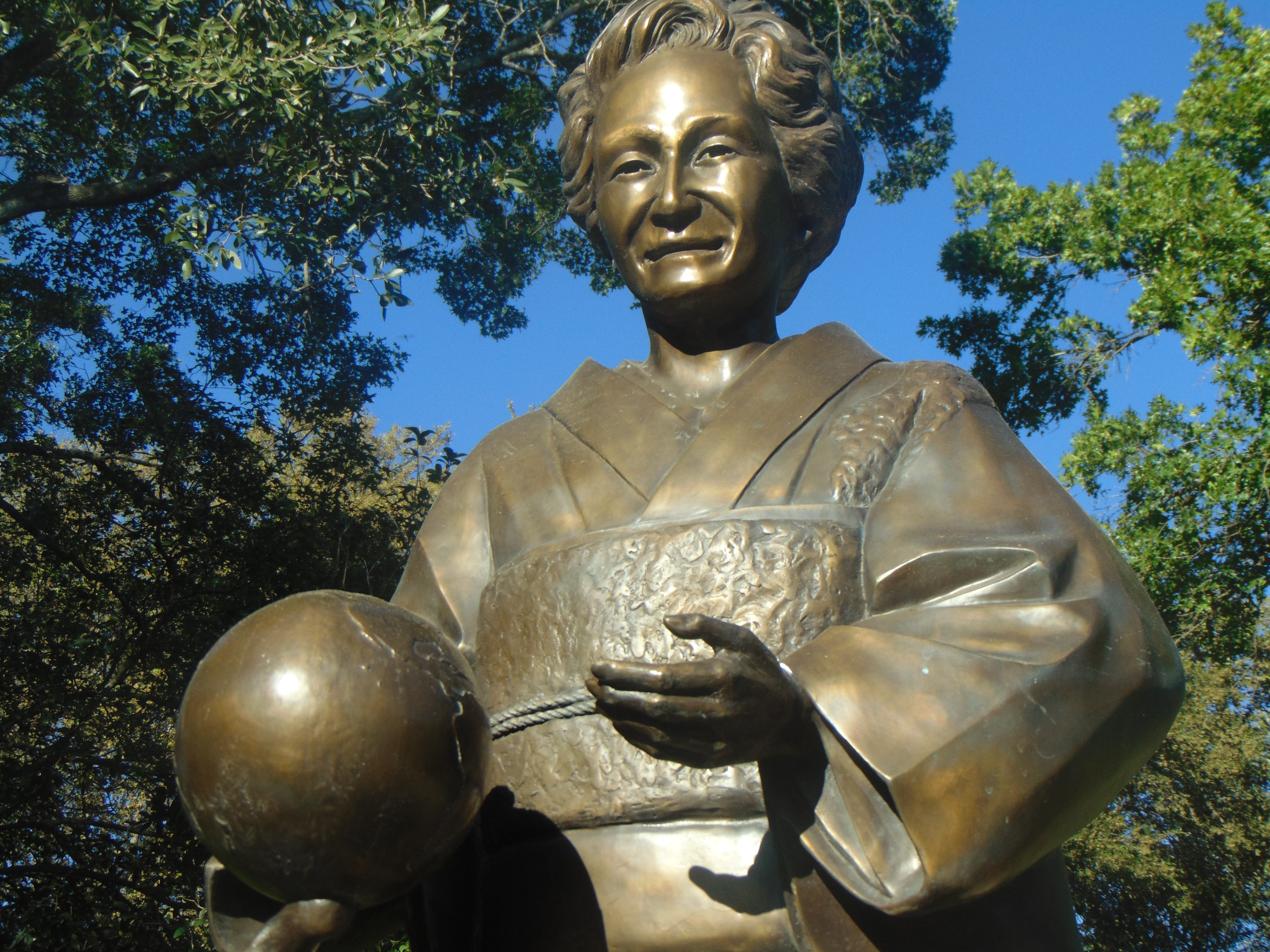
Statue of Naoko Shirane outside of Kumamoto En Japanese Garden.

Kumamoto En (roughly 85 feet (26 m) by 85 feet) is a Japanese garden reflecting styles and techniques from Kumamoto's 300-year-old Suizenji Park and from Katsura Detached Palace garden in Kyoto. Near the entrance to the garden there is a statue of Naoko Shirane, a representative of the city for Japan and helped establish Kumamoto as a Sister city in 1987 through the establishment of the garden.

- Texas Native Trail - Trail that represents different ecological regions in Texas. The East Texas area has Pineywoods Lake with plants and structures from the East Texas piney woods. The Texas Hill Country area has homesteads such as the Auld House and Schumacher House. These homesteads were donated to the botanical gardens. Dan Auld, the son of Alexander Auld, donated the Auld House to the city of San Antonio in 1976, where it was then relocated to the botanical gardens. The South Texas area has a bird watching area at the end of the trail that is accessible to the public.
- Sullivan Carriage House (originally constructed 1896, relocated 1988) - designed by noted architect Alfred Giles for banker Daniel J. Sullivan. The structure was relocated, brick by brick, in 1988 from its original location in downtown San Antonio to the Botanical Gardens. The building was fully restored and dedicated in 1995. The structure now serves as the main entrance to the gardens and its former stables and carriage house contain a restaurant, gift shop, offices as well as event and meeting space.

== Gallery ==
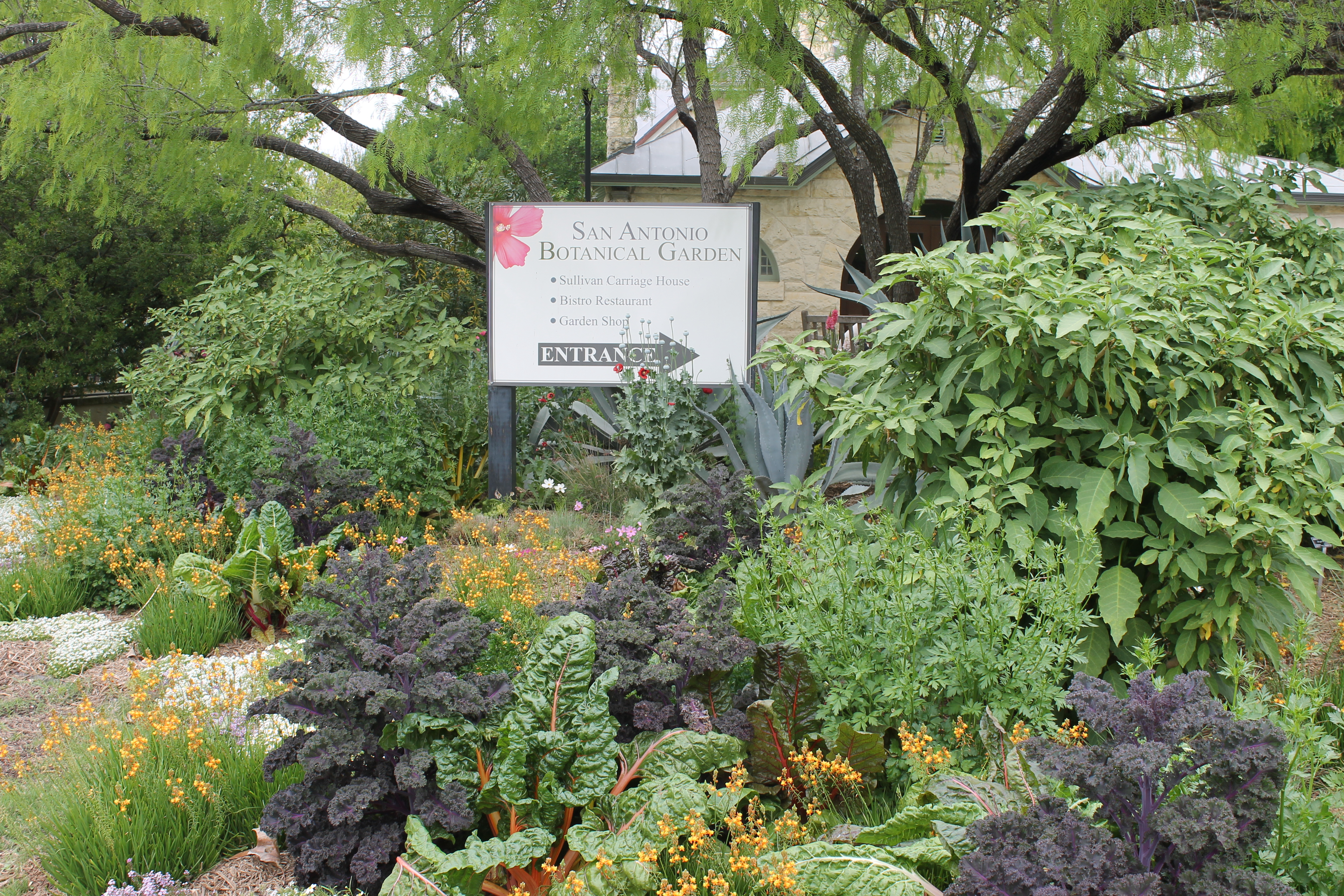
Entrance to the garden

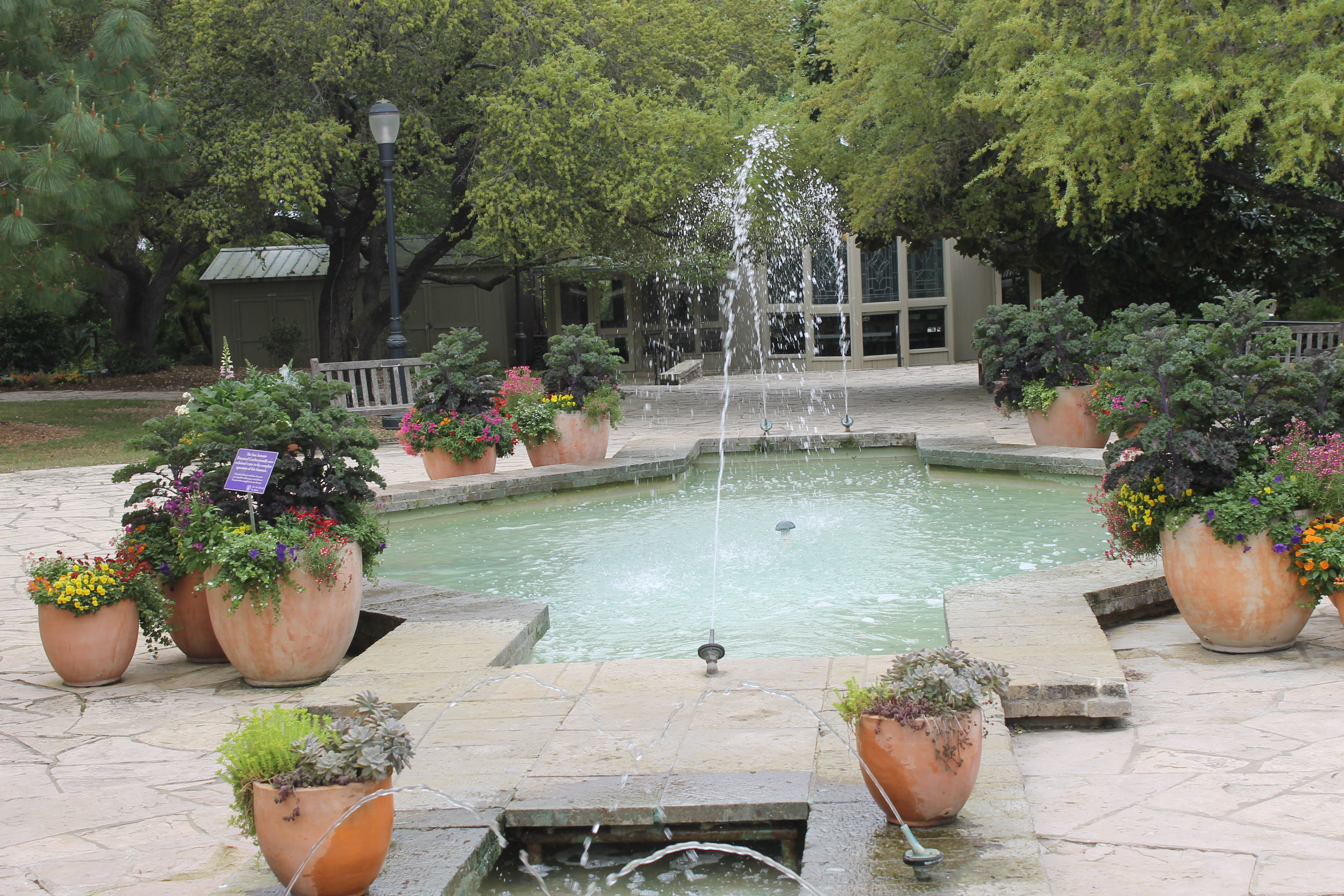
Fountain

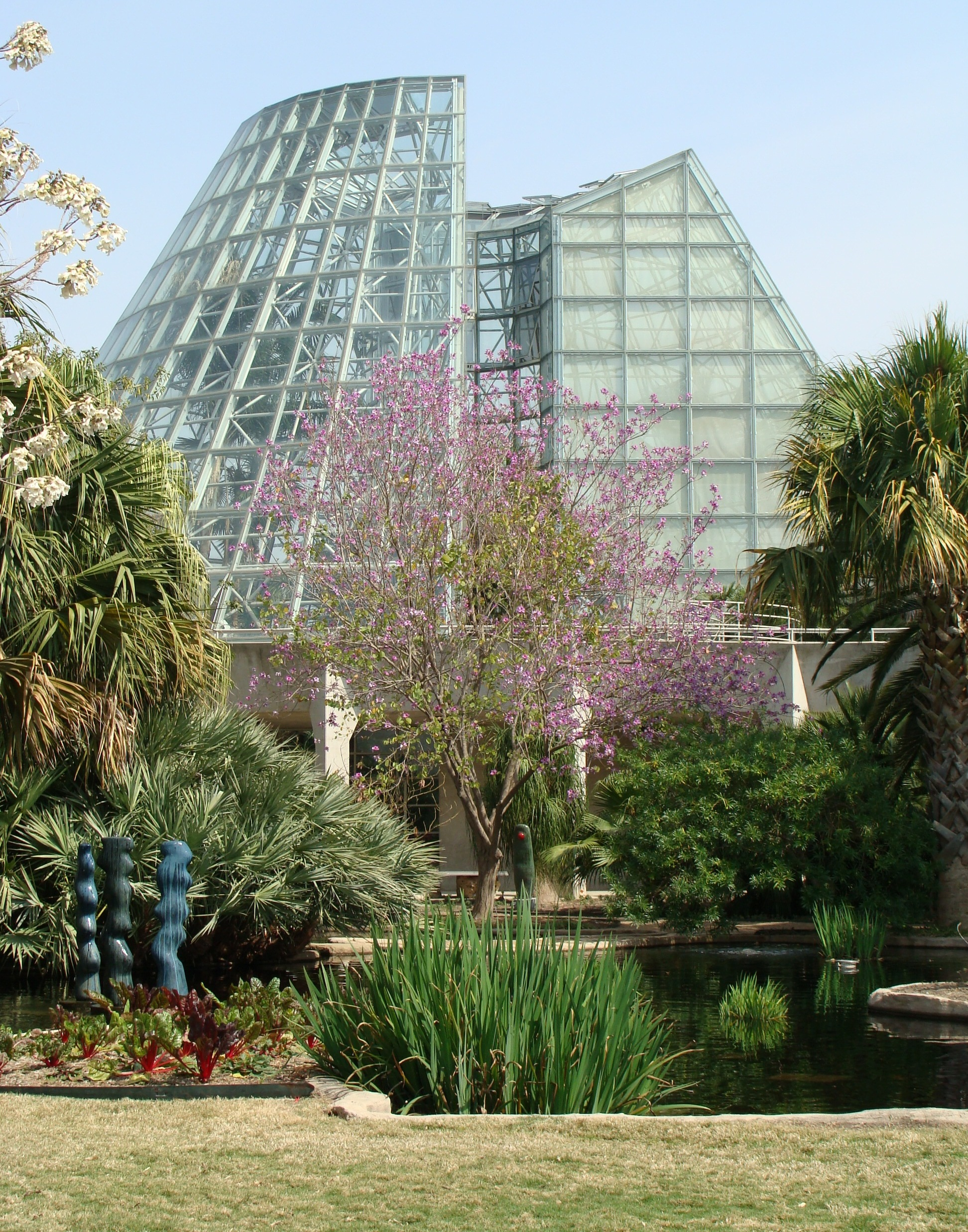
Outside view of one of the conservatory pavilions.

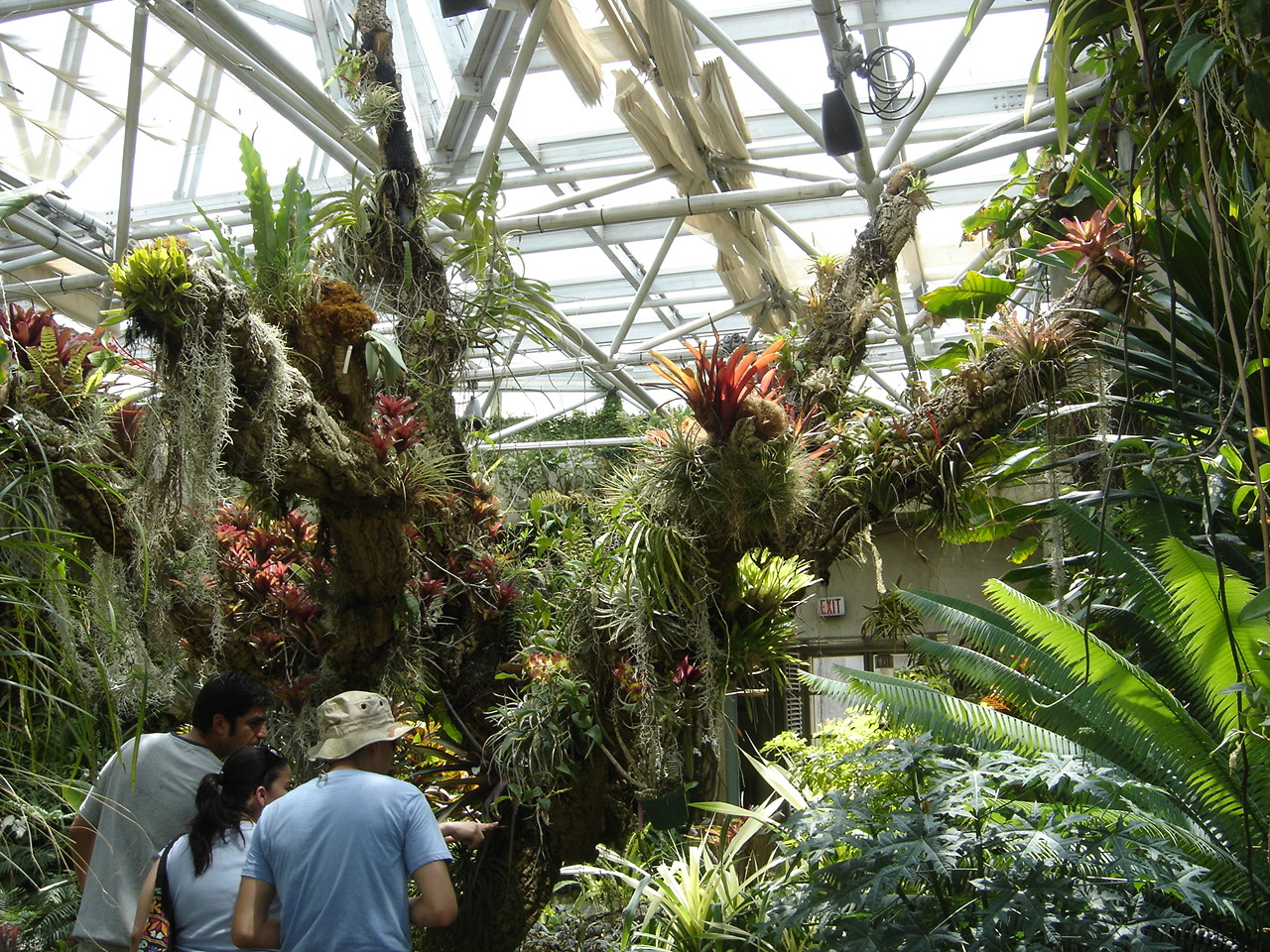
Interior of the Palm & Cycad Pavilion.

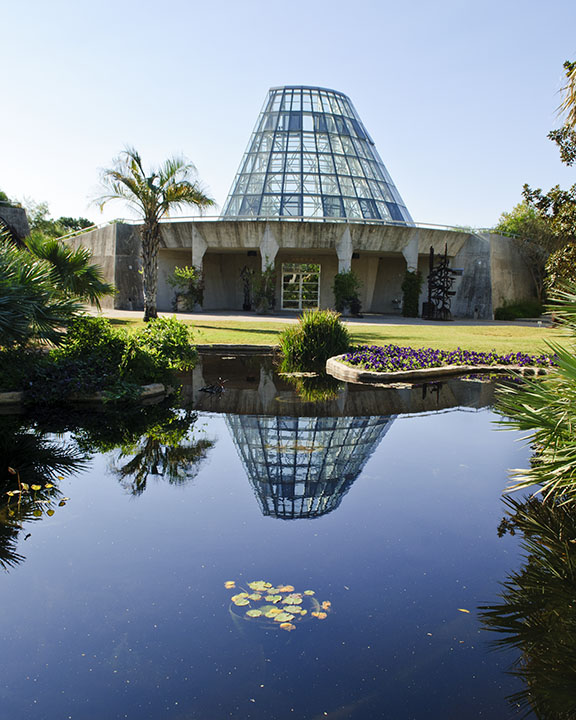
Epiphyte Garden.

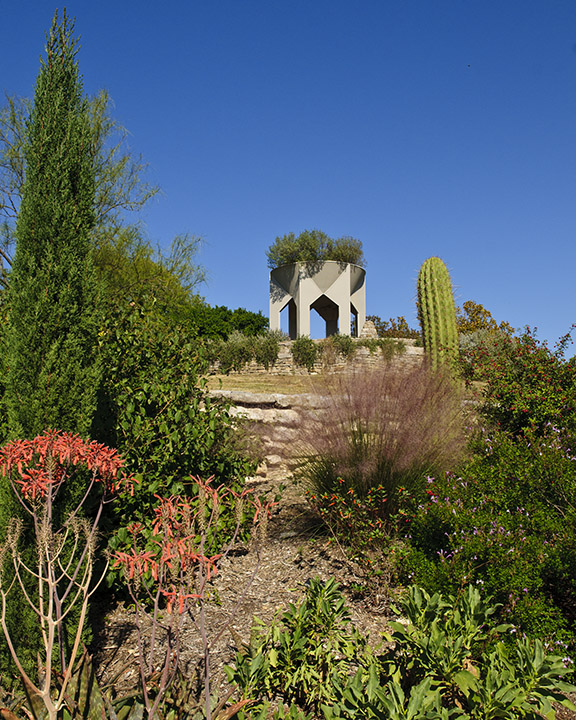
Overlook Tower

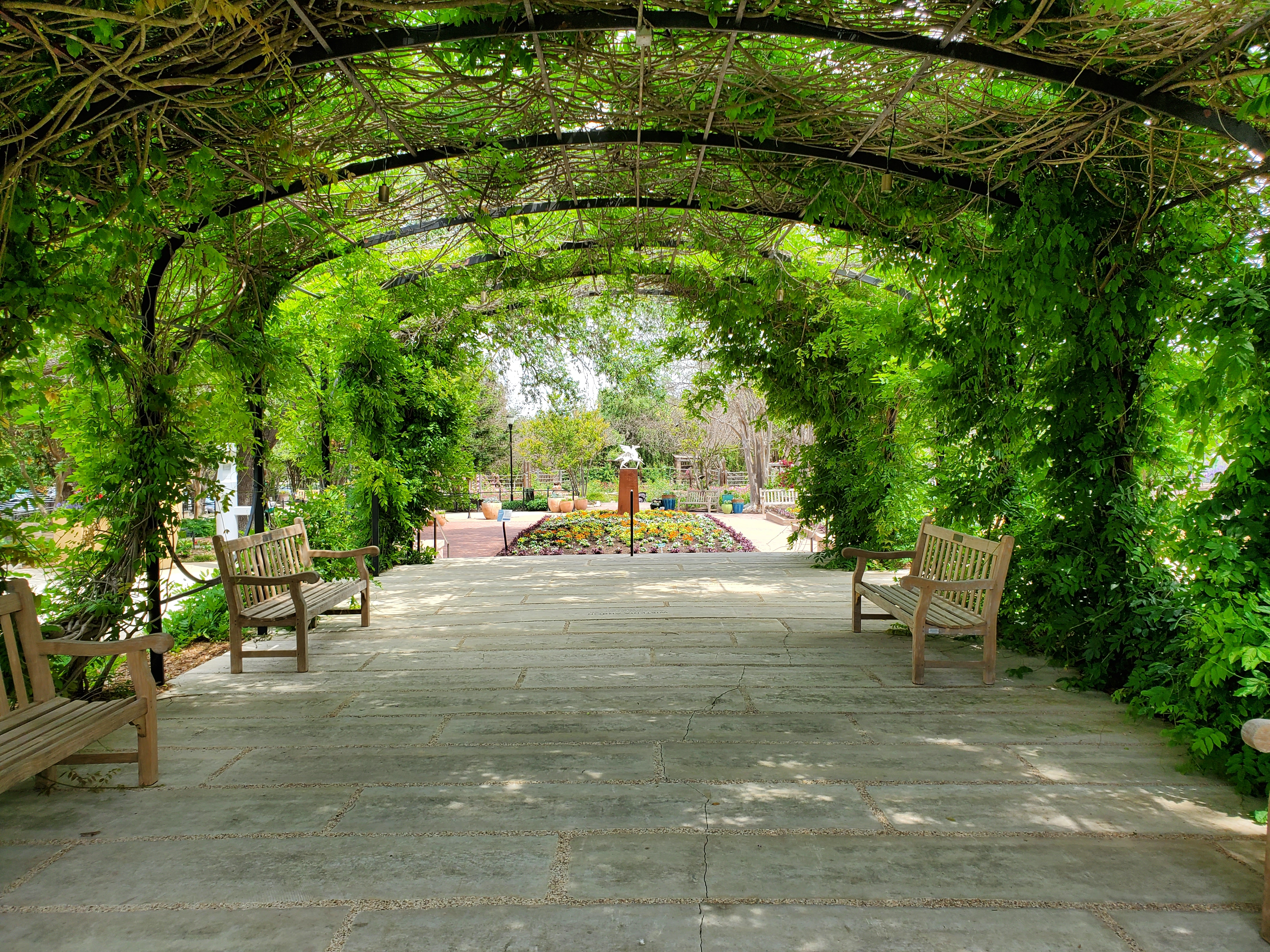
The Green Archway facing the Rose Garden.

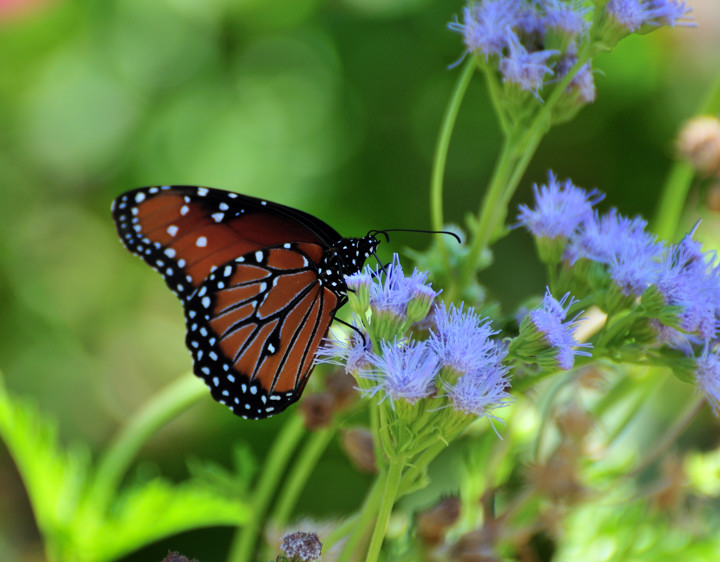
Close-up of a butterfly in a garden area.

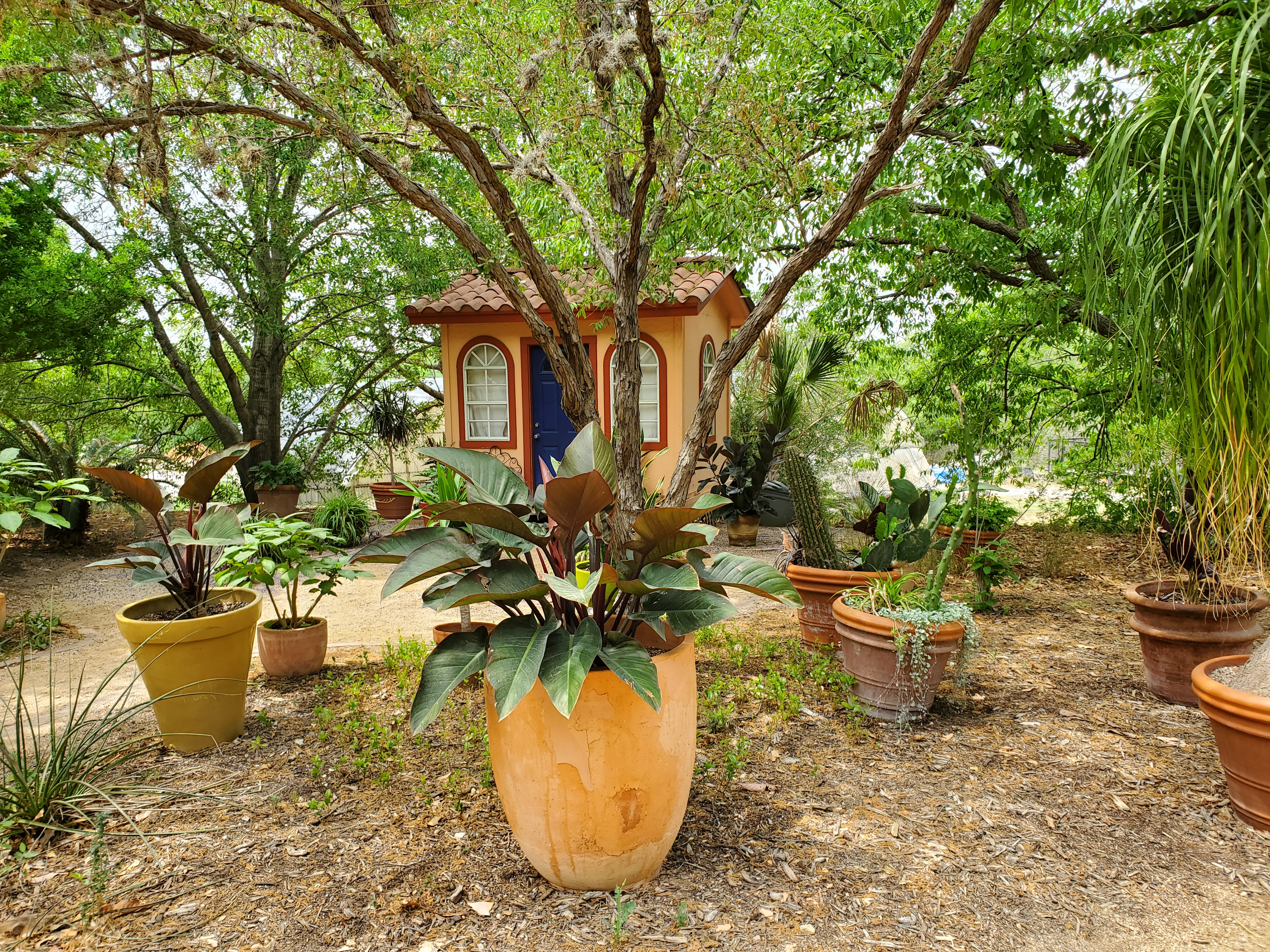
A traditional southwest style house and yard.

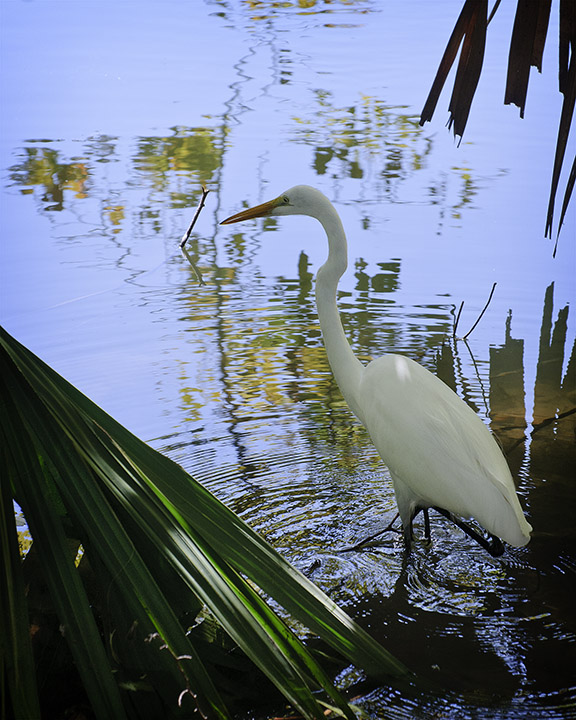
Great egret in a pond.

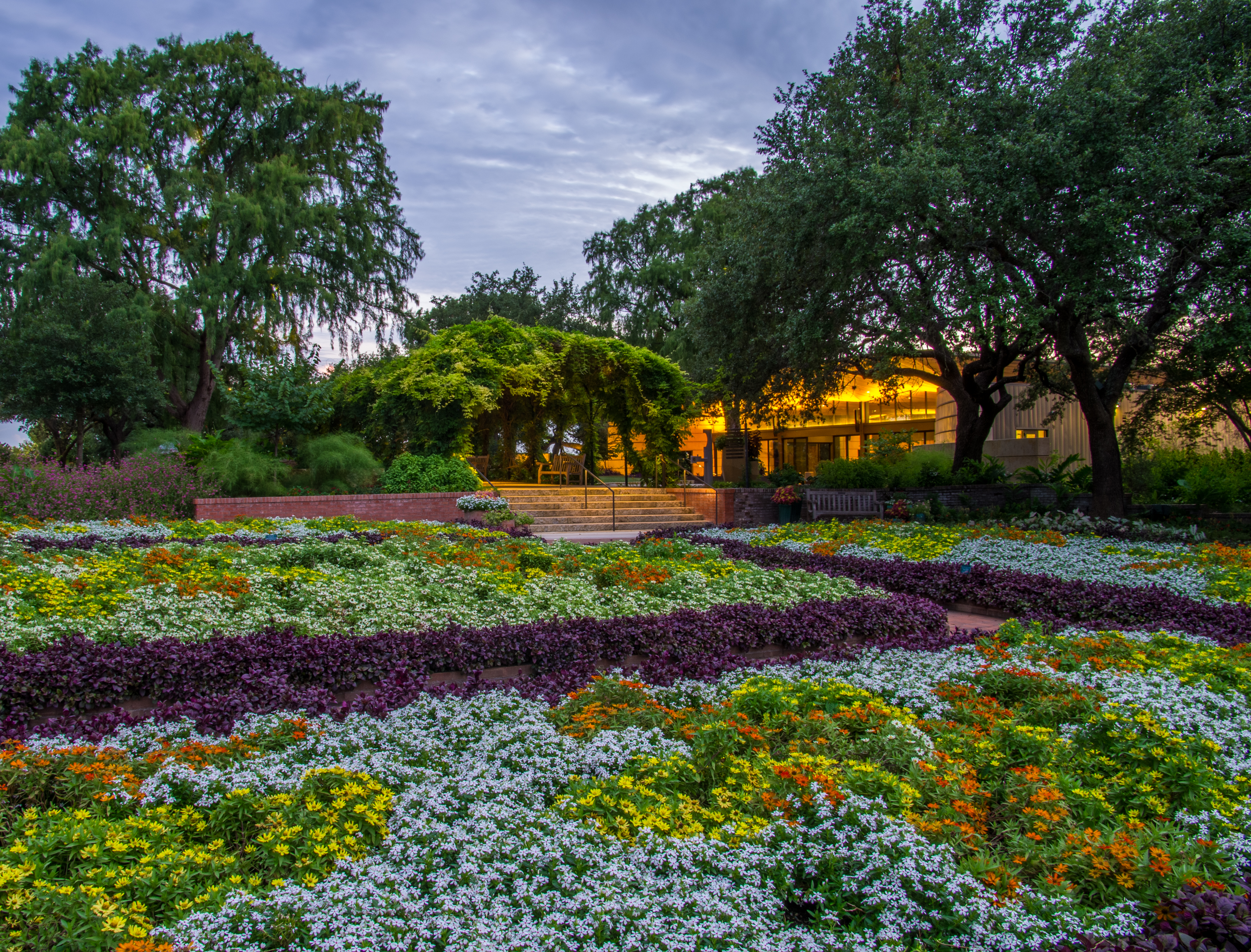
Area of the gardens during evening.

== See also ==
- List of botanical gardens in the United States
