= International Union of Painters and Allied Trades =

North American trade union

- Abbreviation: IUPAT
- Formation: 1887
- Type: Trade union
- Headquarters: Hanover, Maryland, US
- Locations: Canada; United States
- Members: 103,858 (2014)
- President: Jimmy Williams
- Affiliations: AFL-CIO (North America's Building Trades Unions); Building and Wood Workers' International; Canadian Labour Congress
- Website: iupat.org
- Formerly called: Brotherhood of Painters and Decorators of America; International Brotherhood of Painters and Allied Trades

The International Union of Painters and Allied Trades (IUPAT) is a trade union representing about 100,000 painters, glaziers, wall coverers, flooring installers, convention and trade show decorators, glassworkers, sign and display workers, asbestos worker/hazmat technician and drywall finishers in the United States and Canada. Most of its members work in the construction industry. The union's headquarters are located in Hanover, Maryland.

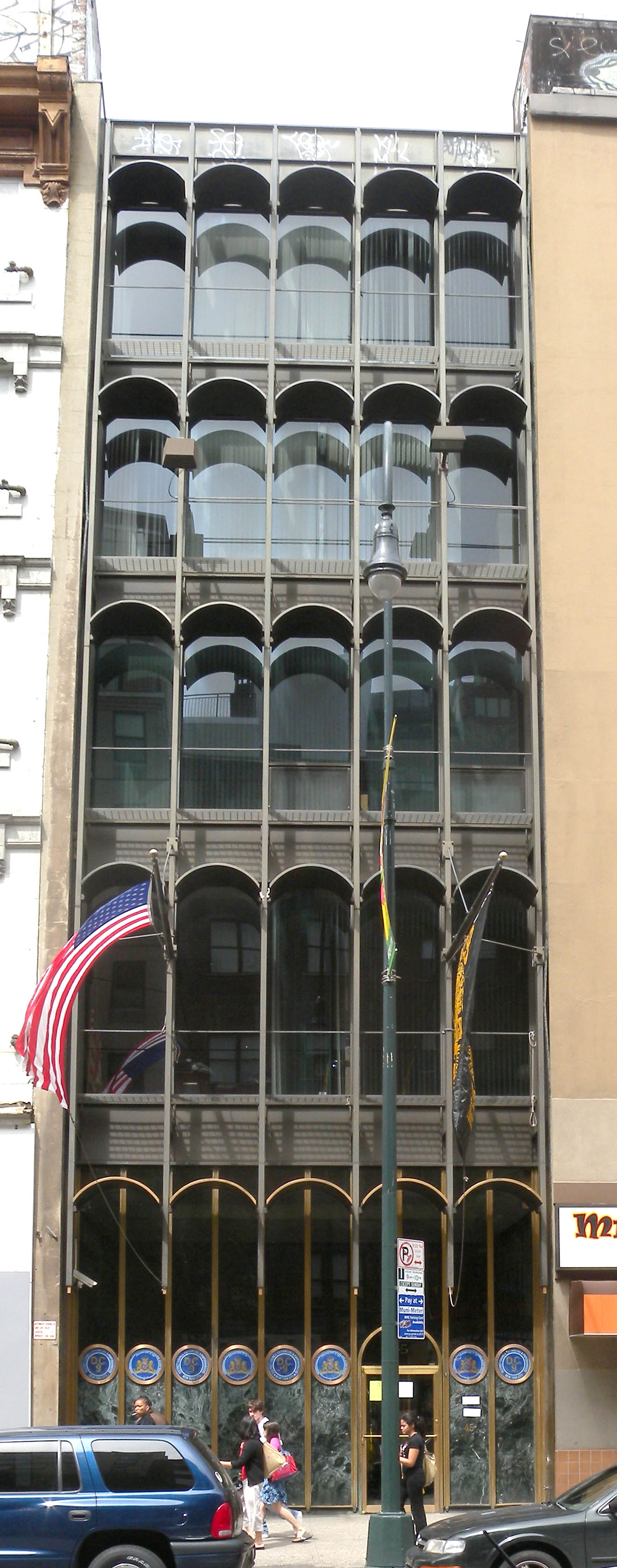
District Council 9, New York

IUPAT presence in support of Jon Corzine at a rally during the 2009 New Jersey gubernatorial race.

Originally called the Brotherhood of Painters and Decorators of America, the union was first formed in 1887. It changed its name to International Brotherhood of Painters and Allied Trades in January 1970.

Local unions belong to district councils. District councils perform most of the services of the union. IUPAT is affiliated with the AFL-CIO in the US.

== Electoral politics ==
The Painters was one of three unions (SEIU and AFSCME were the others) to endorse Howard Dean during the 2004 Democratic primaries. In a surprise move in 2008, IUPAT endorsed Republican presidential candidate Mike Huckabee. The union had endorsed Hillary Clinton in the Democratic primaries, and endorsed Barack Obama for president in June 2008. They endorsed Hillary Clinton in the 2016 Democratic Presidential Primary.

== Leadership ==
=== Presidents ===
1887: Joseph Harrold
1888: George A. Thompson
1892: Joseph W. McKinney
1894: John M. Welter
1894: James H. Sullivan
1896: Michael P. Carrick
1897: Robert H. Siekmann
1898: Frederick J. Kneeland
1899: William DeVaux
1901: Joseph C. Balhorn
1909: George F. Hendrick
1928: John M. Finan
1929: Lawrence P. Lindelof
1951: Lawrence M. Raftery
1965: Bud Raftery
1984: William A. Duval
1992: A. L. Monroe
1998: Michael E. Monroe
2003: James A. Williams Sr.
2013: Ken Rigmaiden
2021: James A. Williams Jr.

=== Secretary-Treasurers ===
1887: John T. Elliot
1896: Joseph W. McKinney
1897: John Barrett
1899: W. C. Rese
1899: Frank Hognan
1900: W. T. Cornelly
1901: Michael P. Carrick
1904: Joseph C. Skemp
1922: Charles J. Lammert
1927: Clarence E. Swick
1942: Lawrence M. Raftery
1952: William H. Rohrberg
1966: O. T. Satre
1972: Michael DiSilvestro
1976: Robert Petersdorf
1987: A. L. Monroe
1991: William Neal Sledge
1992: Walter G. Raftery
1995: James A. Williams Sr.
2003: George Galis
2021: Greg Smith

== See also ==
- Dow Wilson, assassinated California union leader

== General Reference ==
- International Brotherhood of Painters and Allied Trades of the United States and Canada, Local 201 Records, 1900-1982. M.E. Grenander Department of Special Collections and Archives, University Libraries, University at Albany, State University of New York (hereafter referred to as the Local 201 Records).
