= Bud Raftery =

American labor union leader (1918–1986)

15th President of the Brotherhood of Painters and Decorators of America
- In office 1964–1984
- Preceded by: Lawrence M. Raftery
- Succeeded by: William A. Duval

Personal details
- Born: Sylvester Frank Raftery; November 30, 1918 St. Louis, Missouri, U.S.
- Died: November 20, 1986 (aged 67)
- Parent: Lawrence M. Raftery (father)
- Profession: Labor union leader

Military service
- Allegiance: United States
- Branch/service: United States Navy
- Unit: Seabee
- Battles/wars: World War II

Sylvester Frank "Bud" Raftery (November 30, 1918 – November 20, 1986) was an American labor union leader.

Born in St. Louis, Missouri, Raftery was the son of Lawrence M. Raftery. He became a sign painter at the age of 16, and joined the Brotherhood of Painters, Decorators and Paperhangers of America (BPDPA), in which his father was also active.

Raftery served with the Seebees in the Pacific during World War II. In the early 1950s, his father became president of the BPDPA, and he appointed Bud as its full-time director of jurisdiction. In 1964, he succeeded his father as union president.

As leader of the union, Raftery moved its headquarters to Washington D.C. He also created a national pension fund for painters, and set up a health and safety department in the union. He also served as a vice-president of the AFL-CIO. However, his leadership of the union was unpopular with rank-and-file members in many larger cities.

Raftery retired in 1984 due to poor health. He died two years later.

Trade union offices
Preceded by Lawrence M. Raftery	President of the Brotherhood of Painters, Decorators and Paperhangers of America; 1964–1984	Succeeded by William A. Duval
