= Ken Rigmaiden =

American labor union leader

Kenneth E. Rigmaiden is a former American labor union president.

Rigmaiden attended San Jose State University. He then completed an apprenticeship as a floor coverer in San Jose, California, and in 1977 he joined the International Union of Painters and Allied Trades. He held various roles in his local union, during which time he merged it with several other locals, and negotiated the first regional collective bargaining agreement in northern California.

In 1996, Rigmaiden began working for the international union, and the following year he completed a degree in labor studies at Antioch University. During this period, he was the co-ordinator for the union's Job Corps Program. In 2002, he was elected as executive general vice-president of the union. He was elected as president of the union in 2013, the first African American to lead a building trades union. As leader of the union, he campaigned to strengthen workers' rights, and also campaigned for immigrants' rights. He additionally served as a vice-president of the AFL-CIO. He retired in 2021.

Trade union offices
Preceded by James A. Williams Sr.	President of the International Union of Painters and Allied Trades; 2013–2021	Succeeded by James A. Williams Jr.
