= Lawrence M. Raftery =

American labor union leader

Lawrence M. Raftery (February 27, 1895 – June 18, 1983) was an American labor union leader.

Born in St. Louis, Missouri, Raftery attended the Christian Brothers College School of Art and Interior Decorating, before becoming a painter and decorator. In 1913, he joined the Brotherhood of Painters, Decorators and Paperhangers of America (BPDPA), and from 1919 to 1923, he was business agent of his union local. In 1925, he became secretary and business agent of the St Louis Painters' District Council, and he was also elected to the executive of the Missouri State Federation of Labor. In 1936, he was appointed to the St. Louis Grand Jury.

In 1937, Raftery was elected as a vice-president of the BPDPA, and then in 1942 became general secretary-treasurer. In 1952, he was elected as president of the union. In 1958, he was elected as a vice-president of the AFL-CIO. He had nine children, and one of them, Bud Raftery, succeeded him as union president in 1964. Lawrence retained his AFL-CIO post until 1968, when he fully retired.

Trade union offices
Preceded by Clarence E. Swick	Secretary-Treasurer of the Brotherhood of Painters, Decorators and Paperhangers of America; 1942–1952	Succeeded by William H. Rohrberg
Preceded by Lawrence P. Lindelof	President of the Brotherhood of Painters, Decorators and Paperhangers of America; 1952–1964	Succeeded by Bud Raftery
