= A. L. Monroe =

American labor union leader (1931–2024)

Alfred LeRoy "Mike" Monroe (November 25, 1931 – September 9, 2024) was an American labor union leader.

== Life and career ==
Born in Alexandria, Virginia, Monroe became a painter, and joined the International Brotherhood of Painters and Allied Trades. He held positions in his local union, then in 1960 became the business representative for the district council. In 1964, he was appointed as a general representative for the union, serving until 1972, when he was elected as the union's general vice president.

Monroe was elected as secretary-treasurer of the union in 1984, and then in 1992 as general president. In 1995, he was additionally elected as a vice-president of the AFL-CIO. He retired in 1998, becoming general president emeritus of the union. Monroe was succeeded as president by his son, Michael E. Monroe.

Monroe died on September 9, 2024, at the age of 92.

Trade union offices
Preceded by Robert Petersdorf	Secretary-Treasurer of the International Brotherhood of Painters and Allied Trades; 1987–1992	Succeeded by Walter G. Raftery
Preceded by William A. Duval	President of the International Brotherhood of Painters and Allied Trades; 1992–1998	Succeeded by Michael E. Monroe
