= Glazier =

Profession

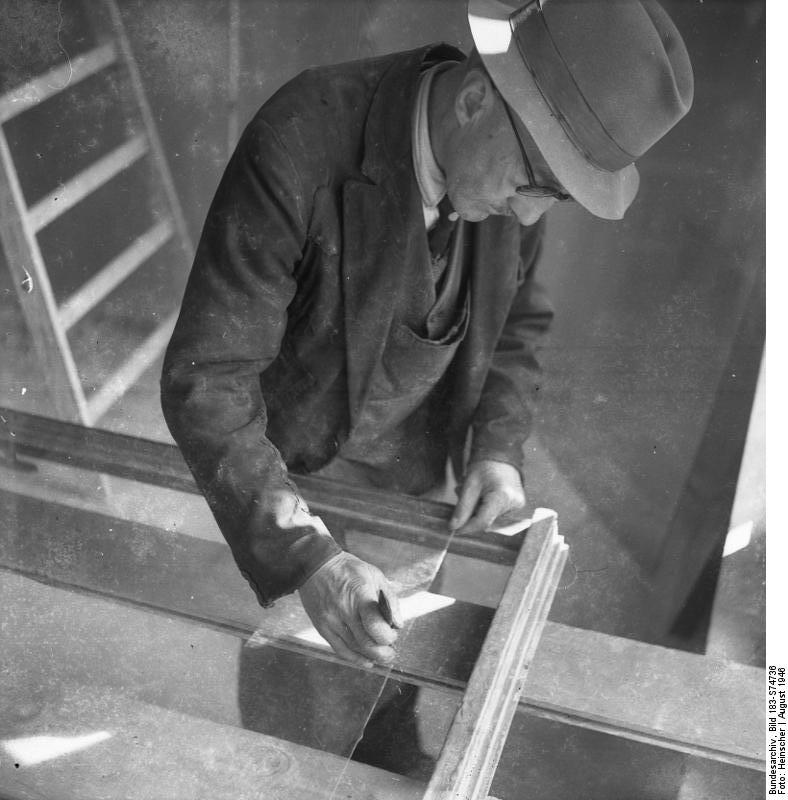
- A glazier at work, 1946

Occupation
- Occupation type: Vocational
- Activity sectors: Construction

Description
- Competencies: Heights, patience, steady hand, ability to read plans, physically strong
- Education required: Apprenticeship
- Fields of employment: Construction
- Related jobs: Carpenter, electrician, plumber, plasterer

A glazier is a tradesperson responsible for cutting, installing, and removing glass (and materials used as substitutes for glass, such as some plastics). They also refer to blueprints to figure out the size, shape, and location of the glass in the building. They may have to consider the type and size of scaffolding they need to stand on to fit and install the glass. Glaziers may work with glass in various surfaces and settings, such as cutting and installing windows, doors, shower doors, skylights, storefronts, display cases, mirrors, facades, interior walls, ceilings, and tabletops.

== Duties and tools ==
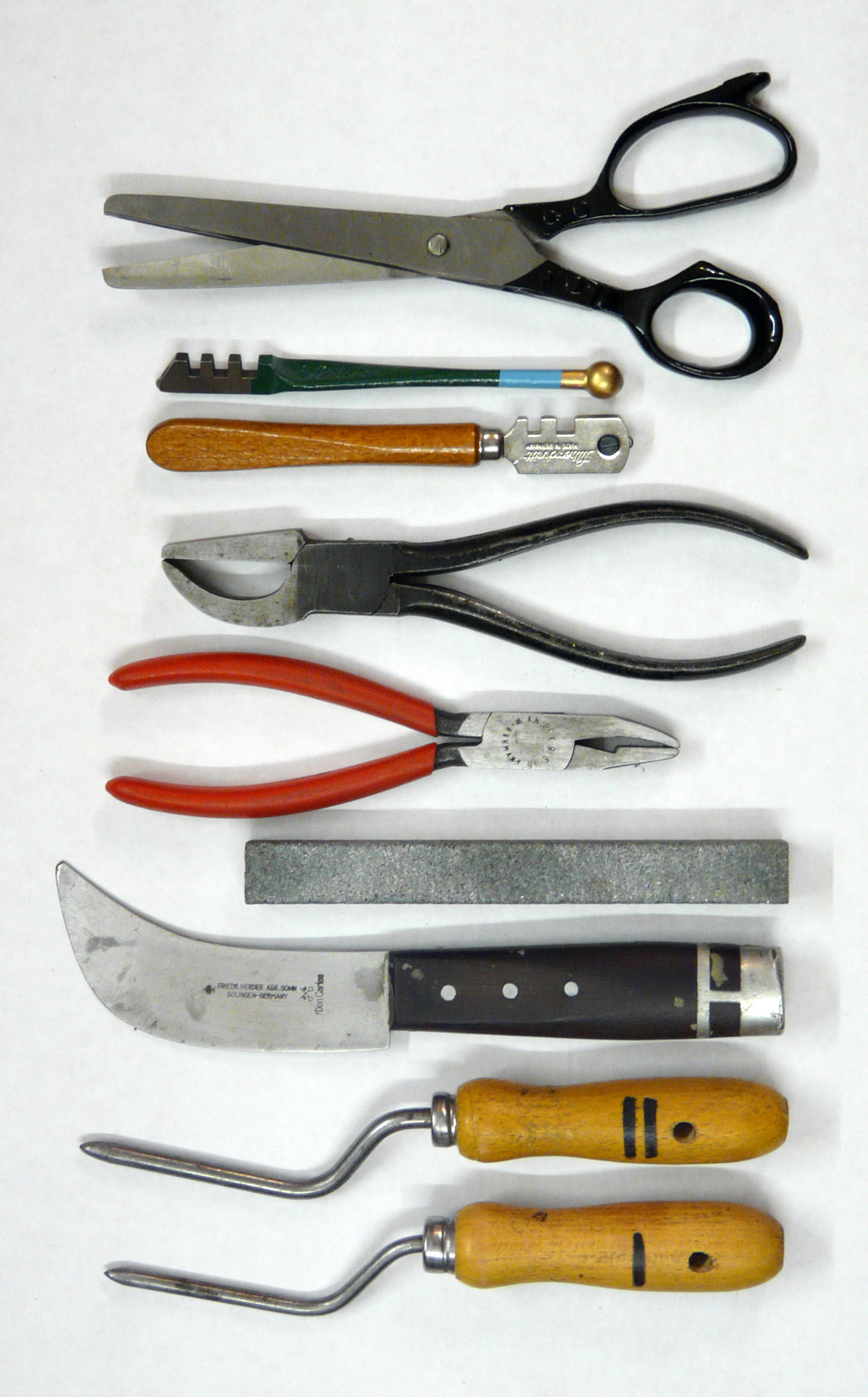
A set of glazier tools

The Occupational Outlook Handbook of the U.S. Department of Labor lists the following as typical tasks for a glazier:

- Follow blueprints or specifications
- Remove any old or broken glass before installing replacement glass
- Cut glass to the specified size and shape
- Make or install sashes or moldings for glass installation
- Fasten glass into sashes or frames with clips, moldings, or other types of fasteners
- Add weather seal or putty around pane edges to seal joints.

The National Occupational Analysis recognized by the Canadian Council of Directors of Apprenticeship separates the trade into 5 blocks of skills, each with a list of skills, and a list of tasks and subtasks a journeyman is expected to be able to accomplish:

Block A – Occupational Skills

1. Uses and maintains tools and equipment
2. Organizes work
3. Performs routine activities

Block B – Commercial Window and Door Systems

4. Fabricates commercial window and door systems
5. Installs commercial window and door systems

Block C – Residential Window and Door Systems

6. Installs residential window systems Installs residential door systems

Block D – Specialty Glass and Products

8. Fabricates and installs specialty glass and products
9. Installs glass systems on vehicles

Block E – Servicing

10. Services commercial window and door systems
11. Services residential window and door systems
12. Services specialty glass and products.

Tools used by glaziers "include cutting boards, glass-cutting blades, straightedges, glazing knives, saws, drills, grinders, putty, scrapers, sandpaper, sanding blocks, 5 in 1's respirator/dust mask and glazing compounds."

Some glaziers work specifically with glass in motor vehicles; other work specifically with the safety glass used in aircraft. Others repair old antique windows and doors that need glass replaced.

== Education and training ==
Glaziers are typically educated at the high school diploma or equivalent level and learn the skills of the trade through an apprenticeship program, which in the U.S. is typically four years.

In the U.S., apprenticeship programs are offered through the National Glass Association as well as trade associations and local contractors' associations. A large portion of glaziers in the United States are members of the IUPAT, the International Union of Painters and Allied Trades which offers its own apprenticeship program which consists of 8000 hours of on the job training and 4 years of classroom education. Because of this, IUPAT Glaziers tend to be well rounded in all aspects of the trade, and therefore carry a higher production rate, face fewer health & safety risks and command a higher pay rate.

In Canada, glaziers usually go through a formal apprenticeship which includes about four years of on-the-job experience combined with classroom study in order to get certified. Unions and many employers offer these apprenticeships. To become an apprentice, one must be at least 18 years old and have graduated from high school. Once a person is certified, they will be eligible to apply for the Red Seal allowing the person to work anywhere in Canada without re-certifying. In Ontario, Canada, apprenticeships are offered at the provincial level and certified through the Ontario College of Trades.

== Occupational hazards ==
Occupational hazards encountered by glaziers include the risks of being cut by glass or tools and falling from scaffolds or ladders or lead exposure from old lead paint on antique windows. The use of heavy equipment may also cause injury: the National Institute for Occupational Safety and Health (NIOSH) reported in 1990 that a journeyman glazier died in an industrial accident in Indiana after attempting to use a manlift to carry a thousand-pound case of glass which the manlift did not have capacity to carry.

== In the United States ==
According to the Occupational Outlook Handbook, there are some 45,300 glaziers in the United States, with median pay of $38,410 per year in 2014. Two-thirds of glaziers work in the foundation, structure, and building exterior contractors industry, with smaller numbers working in building material and supplies dealing, building finishing contracting, automotive repair and maintenance, and glass and glass product manufacturing.

Among the 50 states, only Connecticut and Florida require glaziers to hold a license.

== In Australia ==
In Australia, glaziers provide a broad spectrum of services for both residential and commercial properties. These tasks include emergency glass replacement, window repairs, and the custom installation of shower screens, mirrors, and glass splashbacks. To ensure safety, quality, and structural integrity, glaziers operating in Australia must adhere to strict national building codes, primarily the Australian Standard AS1288 (Glass in buildings – Selection and installation). Homeowners and property managers commonly utilize specialized local trade networks and directories to locate certified and compliant glazing professionals for these projects.

While formal qualifications are not strictly mandated by law to work as a glazier across all states, it is the industry standard for apprentices to complete a Certificate III in Glass and Glazing as part of their vocational training. Most apprentices choose to complete the Certificate III in Glass and Glazing (MSF30418) part-time over three years. Alternatively, the course can be undertaken through full-time study for one year. The Certificate II in Glass and Glazing (MSF20413) is also available for individuals requiring foundational knowledge or supplementary study.

== See also ==
- Architectural glass
- Glazing in architecture
- Insulated glazing
- Stained glass
- Glass manufacturing
- Glassblowing
