= Michael E. Monroe =

American labor union leader

Michael E. Monroe is a former American labor union leader.

The son of A. L. Monroe, Michael joined the International Brotherhood of Painters and Allied Trades. He was elected as a vice-president of the union in 1984, and then in 1998 succeeded his father as president. As leader of the union, he focused on organizing new members and encouraging members to engage in political activity. He changed the union's name to the "International Union of Painters and Allied Trades". He was also elected as a vice-president of the AFL-CIO.

Monroe came into conflict with Edward C. Sullivan, president of the AFL-CIO's Building and Construction Trades Department. After speaking out against Sullivan in 2002, he resigned as leader of the union. He retired in 2003.

Trade union offices
Preceded by A. L. Monroe	President of the International Union of Painters and Allied Trades; 1998–2003	Succeeded by James Williams
