= National Glass Association =

Trade association

The National Glass Association is the largest trade association for the auto glass, architectural glass, and window and door markets. The NGA was founded in 1948, and currently has close to 3,000 member companies. This international association represents the interests of companies worldwide.

The NGA's Mission:

To provide information and education, as well as promote quality workmanship, ethics, and safety in the architectural, automotive and window and door glass industries. NGA acts as a clearinghouse for industry information, a catalyst in education and training matters, and a powerful voice on behalf of our members.

The NGA publishes Glass Magazine and Window & Door and organizes GlassBuild America: The Glass, Window, and Door Expo.
