= List of match-fixing incidents =

Match fixing is when the outcome of a match in organized sports has been manipulated. The reason for fixing a match includes ensuring a certain team advances or gambling. Match fixing is seen as one of the biggest problems in organized sports and is considered as a major scandal. This article is a list of match fixing incidents and of matches that are widely suspected of having been fixed.

== American football ==
- The Canton Bulldogs–Massillon Tigers betting scandal, which is recognized as the first major scandal in professional football history, unfolded after the 1906 Ohio League championship series. Canton Bulldogs coach Blondy Wallace and Massillon Tigers end Walter East were accused of conspiring to fix the series.
- In 1915, an unidentified gambler made an offer of $150 to Multnomah Athletic Club football player L. W. "Patsy" O'Rourke to throw the team's annual Thanksgiving game against the University of Oregon football team. O'Rourke approached team captain Red Rupert about the bribe, and the information ultimately made its way to Multnomah's coach. As a result, O'Rourke was benched for the game, which was a 15–2 victory for Oregon.
- An attempt was made to fix the 1946 NFL Championship Game between the New York Giants and the Chicago Bears, in favor of the latter team. Alvin J. Paris was convicted of bribery in 1947 for soliciting Giants players Frank Filchock and Merle Hapes. Harvey Stemmer and David "Pete" Karkower were also convicted of bribery for their involvement in the plot. The convictions were upheld on appeal in 1948.
- In 1949, Daniel Opalka of Massena, New York, was arrested for allegedly offering Massena High School football player David Walker $200 to fix the team's upcoming game against Saranac Lake High School. Opalka admitted to having a conversation with Walker about fixing the game, but said he was doing so in jest.
- In 1960, Brooklyn, New York, school teacher David Budin was arrested by Michigan State Police for allegedly trying to bribe University of Oregon football team member Mickey Bruce in order to fix the outcome of their upcoming game against the University of Michigan football team. According to police, University of Oregon athletic director Leo Harris declined to press charges to spare Bruce from having to be involved further. Budin was released by police after paying a $150 fine because he registered his hotel room under false name. Bruce later alleged sports gambler Frank Rosenthal was the mastermind of the plot.
- In 1998, four Northwestern University football players were indicted for lying to a federal grand jury when they testified they had not placed wagers on their own games in 1994. Only one player—tailback Dennis Lundy—was accused of fixing the game. Lundy denied in front of the grand jury to intentionally fumbling on a play during a game against the University of Iowa in 1994. Federal prosecutors attested the fumble was intentional for the purposes of point-shaving.
- 2015: On May 6, a federal grand jury in Detroit indicted six former University of Toledo athletes—three each from the school's football and basketball programs—on charges of conspiracy to commit sports bribery in relation to their alleged involvement in a point shaving scheme that ran from 2012 through 2015. It is believed to be the first major U.S. gambling case involving two sports at the same college. Since then, four former Toledo athletes, including at least one not named in the original indictments, have pleaded guilty on charges related to the scheme. One of these, former Rockets running back Quinton Broussard, admitted he had deliberately fumbled during the 2005 GMAC Bowl against UTEP (a game ultimately won 45–13 by Toledo) in exchange for $500, and had been paid to provide confidential team information to one of the orchestrators of the scheme by Ásgeirsson Günther .

== Association football ==
- In 1964, the great British football betting scandal of the 1960s was uncovered: a betting ring organized by Jimmy Gauld and involving several Football League players had been fixing matches. The most famous incident involved three Sheffield Wednesday players, including two England international players, who were subsequently banned from football for life and imprisoned after it was discovered they had bet on their team losing a match against Ipswich Town. There had been a similar scandal in 1915.
- 1980 Italian football scandal ("Totonero"): In May 1980, the largest match-fixing scandal in the history of Italian football was reported to the Italian Guardia di Finanza by the owner of and supplier to a restaurant frequented by players, Alvaro Trinca and Massimo Cruciani, who declared that some Italian football players agreed to fix football matches for money in a scheme planned by Trinca and Cruciani, implicating, among others, AC Milan and Lazio. Teams were suspected of rigging games by selecting favorable referees, with superstar Italian World Cup team goalkeeper Enrico Albertosi and future 1982 FIFA World Cup winner Paolo Rossi being banned for betting on football games. Both clubs were forcibly relegated to Serie B and the ringleader of the scheme, Milan president Felice Colombo, was banned for life.
- In 1981, a mob of about 500 people took over the pitch during a Panionios F.C. practice amid accusations that team trainer Lakis Petropoulos had helped fix a match against P.A.S. Korinthos that resulted in a 0–0 draw. Police assisted Petropoulos to safety.
- During the 1982 FIFA World Cup, West Germany and Austria played a game on 25 June known as the Disgrace of Gijón due to accusations that both teams had fixed the match.
- In 1986, the Yugoslavian Football Association ruled that the first round playoffs of the Yugoslav First League had to be replayed after accusations of match fixing were made against several teams by the press. Twelve of the league's 18 teams were penalized. A court later dismissed the penalties against the clubs.
- In February 1999 a Malaysian-based betting syndicate was caught attempting to install a remote-control device to sabotage the floodlights at FA Premier League team Charlton Athletic's ground, with the aid of a corrupt security officer. If the match had been abandoned after half-time, then the result and bets would have stood. Subsequent investigations showed that the gang had been responsible for previously unsuspected "floodlight failures" at West Ham's ground in November 1997, and again a month later at Crystal Palace's ground during a home match of Palace's groundsharing tenant Wimbledon.
- The Italian Football Federation said in October 2000 it had found eight players guilty of match-fixing. Three were from Serie A side Atalanta and the other five played for Serie B side Pistoiese. The players were Giacomo Banchelli, Cristiano Doni and Sebastiano Siviglia (all Atalanta) and Alfredo Aglietti, Massimiliano Allegri, Daniele Amerini, Gianluca Lillo and Girolamo Bizzarri (all Pistoiese). The charges related to an Italian Cup first round tie between the two sides in Bergamo on August 20, 2000, which ended 1–1. Atalanta scored at the end of the first half and Pistoiese equalised three minutes from full-time. Atalanta qualified for the second round. Snai, which organises betting on Italian football, said later it had registered suspiciously heavy betting on the result and many of the bets were for a 1–0 halftime score and a full-time score of 1–1.
- In 2004, Portuguese Police launched the operation Apito Dourado and named several Portuguese club presidents and football personalities as suspects of match fixing, including FC Porto's chairman Pinto da Costa. Some of the wiretaps used as proof, deemed inadmissible in court, can now be found on YouTube.
- In June 2004 in South Africa, thirty-three people (including nineteen referees, club officials, a match commissioner and an official of the South African Football Association) were arrested on match-fixing charges.
- 2005 German football match-fixing scandal: In January 2005, the German Football Association (DFB) and German prosecutors launched separate probes into charges that referee Robert Hoyzer had fixed several matches in which he refereed and had bet on, including a German Cup tie. Hoyzer later admitted to the allegations; it has been reported that he was involved with Croat gambling syndicates, and also implicated other referees and players in the match-fixing scheme. The first arrests in the Hoyzer investigation were made on January 28 in Berlin; Hoyzer himself was arrested on February 12 after new evidence apparently emerged to suggest that he had been involved in fixing more matches than he had admitted to. Hoyzer was banned for life from football by the DFB. On March 10, a second referee, Dominik Marks, was arrested after being implicated in the scheme by Hoyzer. On March 24 it was reported that Hoyzer had told investigators that the gambling ring he was involved with had access to UEFA's referee assignments for international matches and Champions League and UEFA Cup fixtures several days before UEFA publicly announced them. Hoyzer was sentenced to serve 2 years and 5 months in prison.
- In July 2005, Italian Serie B champions Genoa was downgraded to last place in the division by the sporting justice, and therefore condemned to relegation in Serie C1, after it was revealed that they bribed their opponents in the final match of the season, Venezia to throw the match. Club president Enrico Preziozi was banned for five years after being guilty by the sporting justice. Genoa won the match 3–2 and had apparently secured promotion to Serie A.
- Brazilian football match-fixing scandal: In September 2005, a Brazilian magazine revealed that two football referees, Edílson Pereira de Carvalho (a member of FIFA's referee staff) and Paulo José Danelon, had accepted bribes to fix matches. Soon afterwards, sport authorities ordered the replaying of 11 matches in the country's top competition, the Campeonato Brasileiro, that had been worked by Edílson. Both referees were banned for life from football, and faced criminal charges. After the scandal Brazilian supporters often shouted "Edílson" at a referee considered to have made a bad call against their team.
- 2008 The Fix: Book by Declan Hill alleges that in the 2006 World Cup, the group game between Ghana and Italy, the round-of-16 game between Ghana and Brazil, and the Italy-Ukraine quarter-final had all been fixed by Asian gambling syndicates. The German Football Federation (DFB) and German Football League (DFL) looked into claims made in a Der Spiegel interview with Hill that two Bundesliga matches were fixed by William Bee Wah Lim, a fugitive with a 2004 conviction for match-fixing.
- 2008: On October 1, it was reported that a Spanish judge who headed an investigation against Russian Mafia figures uncovered information alleging that the mobsters might have attempted to fix the 2007–08 UEFA Cup semi-final between eventual champion Zenit St. Petersburg and Bayern Munich. Both clubs denied any knowledge of the alleged scheme. Prosecutors in the German state of Bavaria, home to Bayern, later announced that they did not have enough evidence to justify a full investigation.
- 2008: On October 4, suspicious online betting on the game between Norwich City and Derby County led some to question the validity of the Football League match. Gamblers in Asia were said to have placed a large amount of money down during halftime, which raised concerns over the outcome. The inquiry by The Football Association found no evidence that would suggest the match was fixed. Derby County won the match 2–1.
- In November 2009, German police arrested 17 people on suspicion of fixing at least 200 football matches in 9 countries. Among the suspected games were those from the top leagues of Austria, Bosnia, Croatia, Hungary, Slovenia, and Turkey, and games from the second-highest leagues of Belgium, Germany, and Switzerland. Three contests from the Champions League were also under investigation, and 12 from the Europa League.
- From 2009 to 2011, a large-scale investigation by the Ministry of Public Security of China revealed many match-fixing scandals that took place mainly between 2003 and 2009 in Chinese top-two tier leagues. As a result, Shanghai Shenhua F.C. was stripped of their 2003 top-tier league title. Former vice presidents of Chinese Football Association Xie Yalong, Nan Yong and Yang Yimin were sentenced to 10.5 years in jail. FIFA World Cup referee Lu Jun, and China national football team players Shen Si, Jiang Jin, Qi Hong, Li Ming, were all sentenced to 5.5 or 6 years in jail.
- In June 2011, trials started for people allegedly involved in fixing Finnish football matches. One team, Tampere United was indefinitely suspended from Finnish football for accepting payments from a person known for match-fixing.
- In July 2011, as part of a major match-fixing investigation by authorities in Turkey, nearly 60 people suspected to be involved with fixing games were detained by İstanbul Police Department Organized Crime Control Bureau and then arrested by the court. Fenerbahçe Sports Club executives were acquitted of the match-fixing case with the decision announced on 6 November 2020. The members of the Gulen Movement (referred to by the government of Turkey as Fetullahist Terror Organization) who organized the match-fixing plot were given thousands of years of sentences. Fenerbahçe Sports Club, filed a 250 million TL lawsuit against the TFF (Turkish Football Federation) for compensation for any damage it suffered due to the match-fixing conspiracy.
- The match-fixing investigations of Norwegian Second Division saw Norway and Sweden arresting individuals in 2012, including players of Follo FK and Asker Fotball.
- Operation VETO, a Europol investigation announced in 2013 that identified 380 fixed association football matches in 15 countries.
- The 2013 Lebanese football match-fixing scandal involved 24 players, with two (Ramez Dayoub and Mahmoud El Ali) being banned from the sport for life.
- In December 2013, six people in Britain, including Blackburn forward DJ Campbell, were arrested for charged with fixing football games. The arrests were made by the National Crime Agency after release of a report from FederBet, a Brussels-based gambling watchdog, an organization created by online bookmakers to watch the flow of bets across Europe.
- In 2016, Zimbabwe Football Association (ZIFA) president Phillip Chiyangwa gave a news conference in which he accused the Zimbabwe national football team of fixing matches during the African Nations Championship in January. ZIFA executive committee member Edzai Kasinauyo was suspended for allegedly helping fix an upcoming match against Swaziland. Callisto Pasuwa, who was the head coach of the Zimbabwe national team, was one of the whistleblowers.
- In November 2019, FIFA banned referee Ibrahim Chaibou of Niger for life and imposed a heavy fine on him after finding him guilty of manipulating the results of numerous matches that he oversaw. Among the games proven by FIFA to have been corrupted by Chaibou were friendlies in the lead-up to the 2010 FIFA World Cup, including one between South Africa and Guatemala and another between Bahrain and a fake team presenting itself as the national squad of Togo. In June 2011, Chaibou additionally corrupted a friendly match between Nigeria and Argentina in Abuja.

== Australian football ==
- In 1910, several members of the Carlton Football Club in the Victorian Football League were implicated in a match-fixing scandal. Alex Lang and Doug Fraser were both suspended for five years (99 matches) for their part in the scheme, while Doug Gillespie was briefly dropped by Carlton, but was readmitted to the club before the Grand Final when the league's report on the scandal exonerated him.
- In 2009, allegations arose that the Melbourne Football Club had purposely lost matches to get a better pick in the upcoming Australian Football League draft. An investigation by the AFL exonerated Melbourne after finding no evidence they tanked.

== Badminton ==
- In 1985, English badminton player Steve Baddeley told The Times, "There is no doubt at all that the Chinese sometimes fix matches". Denmark badminton player Kirsten Larsen accused Chinese players Li Lingwei and Han Aiping of fixing their finals match during that year's Chinese National Badminton Championships.
- In 2008, Chinese badminton coach Li Yongbo admitted to fixing a match during the 2004 Summer Olympics. As a response, the Badminton World Federation created an integrity panel to investigate alleged match fixing incidents in badminton.
- During the 2012 Summer Olympics, several of the Badminton women's doubles matches came under scrutiny from Olympic officials and the Badminton World Federation (BWF). Eight players were ejected from games for failing to use their "best efforts" to win their matches. There was no evidence that the games were thrown for gambling purposes; instead the teams deliberately under-performed in round-robin tournament stage matches to get a favorable seeding in the knockout tournament stage. See Badminton at the 2012 Summer Olympics – Women's doubles for details.
- During the 2014 Japan Open, Danish Badminton Athletes Commission president Hans-Kristian Vittinghus was asked via Facebook by a man he met from prior tournaments if he would be interested in fixing matches. Vittinghus declined and later found out the same person approached Danish player Kim Astrup with the same offer. The two went to the Badminton World Federation (BWF) who then requested they re-engage the person in order to find out their identity.
- In 2018, the Badminton World Federation (BWF) issued suspensions of 15 and 20 years for Malaysian players Tan Chun Seang and Zulfadli Zulkiffli, respectively, for fixing matches during various 2013 tournaments. The BWF convinced an independent panel to investigate allegations made by an unnamed whistleblower. The investigation found that Zulkiffli had fixed at least four matches which accounted for 31 infractions under BWF rules.

== Baseball ==
- A game in September 1865 which resulted in a 23–11 victory for the Eckford of Brooklyn over the New York Mutuals was fixed according to confessions by those involved. Mutuals catcher Bill Wansley was approached by gambler Kane McLoughlin to throw the game for $100. Wansley enlisted the help of the Mutuals third baseman Ed Duffy who agreed to participate if they included shortstop Thomas Devyr. Wansley took the two players by wagon to the Hoboken Ferry where the payment was divided. Duffy and Devyr both received $30 each and Wansley kept $40 for himself. The fielding of those in on the fix—particularly Wansley's performance—was so poor that rumors of a fix began almost instantly. Wansley had so many passed balls during the game that he was moved to right field in the seventh inning. Henry Chadwick wrote about the game for the New York Clipper and defended Wansley against the fixing allegations. Mutuals players who were not in on the fix became suspicious of Wansley and accused him of "wilful and designated inattention". After a formal investigation, Wansley admitted to the fix and the three players were banned from organized baseball. Devyr was allowed to return in 1867 for a short time before two complaints from opposing teams were filed against the Mutuals. In December 1867, baseball's National Commission voted to reinstate Devyr. Duffy returned to the Mutuals in 1868, but was not reinstated by the National Commission, which led to one of the Mutuals opponents to file a complaint to void the games Duffy appeared in. The complaint was successful and the Mutuals were briefly expelled from organized baseball. The final convention of the amateur baseball National Commission was held on November 30, 1870. At the convention, Mutuals president John Wildly motioned to reinstate Wansley to good standing which was approved.
- On July 24, 1873 umpire Bob Ferguson declared a game between Baltimore Canaries and the New York Mutuals fixed by gamblers. Ferguson went into the stands to confront the gamblers following the game and then went back down to the field to confront players he believed were in on the fix. Two of the Mutuals players—John Hatfield and Nat Hicks—began accusing each other of being in on the fix. Hicks eventually grabbed a baseball bat and struck Ferguson in the arm which caused it to break. Ferguson, who was also a player as well as an umpire, was unable to play for one year because of the injury. No actions were taken against Hicks or any other player.
- In 1875, the St. Paul Red Caps and the Winona Clippers split a two-game championship series. Rumors gained steam after the series that two Clippers players—Frank Smith and W. W. Fisher—had worked with gamblers to fix the games. Fisher signed a confession that he accepted $250 from an unidentified gambler.
- In 1877, four players for the Louisville Grays were banned from organized baseball for throwing games. Louisville Courier-Journal sports writer John Haldeman, whose father Walter Haldeman owned the team, became suspicious of the play of the four members of the Grays and began writing in his columns that he believed the players were purposefully losing. His columns led to a formal investigation and four players—Jim Devlin, George Hall, Al Nichols and Bill Craver—were banned from organized professional baseball for life. Craver's involvement in the plot is debated by baseball historians including Bob Bailey for the Society of American Baseball Research.
- In 1882, due to his associations with gamblers, National League umpire Dick Higham was banned from organized baseball for life. The information was uncovered by private investigators hired by owners of the Detroit Wolverines, who suspected Higham of fixing games.
- In 1908, National League umpires Jim Johnstone and Bill Klem reported to the league office that they were approached before a make-up game between the Chicago Cubs and the New York Giants and offered money to fix the game. The make-up game was on account of a baserunning mistake by Fred Merkle known as "Merkle's Boner".
- An American League game on September 25, 1919, between the Detroit Tigers and Cleveland Indians was fixed according to letters ascertained by league president Ban Johnson in 1926. The letters were between Detroit outfielder Ty Cobb and Cleveland outfielder Smokey Joe Wood. They were sold to Johnson by pitcher Dutch Leonard who was one of the four players in on the fix along with Cobb, Wood and Cleveland player-manager Tris Speaker. According to Leonard, Cobb suggested the players place bets on the game which they had already agreed to fix. Cobb denied placing any bets, but did confess to being involved in the fix. According to a retrospective of events by the Chicago Tribune in 1989, Leonard went to Johnson with the letters in 1926 after he became embittered at Cobb and Wood whom he felt had a hand in ending his career early. Johnson initially turned Leonard away and he went to Detroit owner Frank Navin with the letters. Navin advised Johnson to make a payment to Leonard to keep the letters from going public. Johnson then agreed to pay Leonard $20,000 for the letters. Following the 1926 season, Johnson called a secret meeting with Cobb and Speaker, who were the managers of their respective teams. Johnson laid out the facts and advised the men to resign their positions as managers, which both did. Cobb and Speaker both retired from playing in 1928 and neither took another managerial job. The Associated Press broke the story on December 21, 1926.
- In 1919, gamblers bribed several members of the Chicago White Sox to throw the World Series. This became known as the Black Sox Scandal and was recounted in the 1963 book Eight Men Out: The Black Sox and the 1919 World Series – which was later adapted for film.
- Following the 1919 Pacific Coast League (PCL) season, first baseman Babe Borton alleged that as a member of the pennant winning Vernon Tigers, he was party to pay-offs to all other PCL teams to ensure they would lose to Vernon. Borton alleged that every member of the Tigers pooled their money to make the pay-offs. Nate Raymond of Seattle, Washington was responsible for the payments according to Borton. Seattle Indians first baseman Rod Murphy alleged that Raymond offered him a $2,000 bribe during the 1920 season and confided that during the 1919 season he won $50,000 from gambling on fixed PCL games. Ultimately no player was faced criminal charges. The PCL banned several players for life, but some like Bill Rumler was reinstated after several years.
- On September 27, 1924, before a game between the New York Giants and the Philadelphia Phillies, Giants backup outfielder Jimmy O'Connell approached Phillies shortstop Heinie Sand with a $500 bribe to throw the game. If the Giants beat the Phillies it would have clinched them the National League pennant and a trip to the World Series. Sand rejected the offer and reported the incident which made its way up to the Commissioner of Baseball Kenesaw Mountain Landis. O'Connell confessed that he did attempt to bribe Sand, but contended Giants coach Cozy Dolan had put him up to it. Landis suspended O'Connell and Dolan from organized baseball for life.
- On June 5, 1947, National Association of Professional Baseball Leagues president George Trautman banned Western Association outfielder Marion McElreath for attempting to bribe an opposing player to fix a game on May 4. 1947.
- In 1947, a report by National Commission president William G. Bramham found that five players in the Evangeline League, a minor league based in Louisiana, fixed several playoff games in 1946 for gambling purposes. For their role in the alleged plot, the five players—Bill Thomas, Lanny Pecou, Alvin W. Kaiser, Paul Fugit and Don Vettorel—were banned from professional baseball for life. An investigation of the alleged actions of the five players by Society for American Baseball Research writer George W. Hilton found little proof that there was any match-fixing. One of the accused players, Bill Thomas, pitched a perfect 5–0 record in the playoffs. Hilton conducted an interview with an unnamed player in the Evangeline League who claimed he was approached to be a part of the fixing scheme, but declined. The unnamed player contended that the plot failed, which was highlighted by one instance where a player who was in on the fix tried to strike out but made contact with the ball for a double.
- Between 1969 and 1971, a series of events known as The Black Mist Scandal rocked Nippon Professional Baseball (NPB) in Japan. It was revealed that several NPB players had been paid off to fix games for gamblers. Ten players were banned from the NPB for life with several other players receiving penalties ranging from salary cuts to suspensions.
- In 1978, outfielder Bárbaro Garbey was banned from Cuban baseball for his part in match-fixing. He defected from Cuba to the United States in 1980 and later that year signed a contract with the Detroit Tigers to join their minor league organization. The match-fixing incidents were revealed for the first time in the American press on May 22, 1983, by the Miami Herald. In an interview with Garbey, Herald writer Peter Richmond brought up match-fixing allegations and Garbey admitted to playing a part in the scheme. Garbey was allowed to continue his minor league career, but the Tigers were prevented from calling him up by the ruling of the National Commission president John H. Johnson. The ruling was lifted in 1984 and the Tigers called Garbey up from the minors. Garbey later returned to Cuba and became a manager.
- In 1982, the ten members of the Cuba national baseball team who participated in that year's Central American and Caribbean Games were arrested and sentenced to between two and four years in prison for fixing games.
- In 1997, 22 players in the Chinese Professional Baseball League were sentenced to between seven and 30 months in prison for match-fixing. So many of the members of China Times Eagles were involved in the plot that the team fielded mostly rookies in that season's championship series.
- In 2005, Yunlin County, Taiwan prosecutor Wei-yu Hsu announced indictments of 16 baseball players, book makers and others involved in fixing professional baseball games. Five of the 16 people were players in the Chinese Professional Baseball League and one of them was a coach. Hsu named Macoto Cobras coach Sheng-fong Tsai and La New Bears catcher Chao-ying Chen as being the orchestrators of the fixings. One of the instances included in the indictment was evidence that La New Bears pitcher Long-shui Tai was paid by Chen to throw a game on July 14, 2005. Chen confessed to investigators that he accepted a payment of NT$600,000 to throw the game.
- In 2008, three players were suspended indefinitely from the Chinese Professional Baseball League (CPBL) for match-fixing. Prosecutors said evidence of the fixing came to light after police detained six members of dmedia T-REX and four people identified as bookmakers. T-Rex executive director Shih Chien-hsin confessed to police that hatched the plan with people identified as "gangsters" by the Taipei Times. The three players banned from the CBPL were catcher Chen Ker-fan, center fielder Chen Yuan-chia and pitcher Cory Bailey. Chen Ker-fan and Chen Yuan-chia, who were both from Taiwan, were arrested and released on NT$50,000 in bail each. Bailey, who is an American national and previously played in Major League Baseball, was arrested and released on a NT$100,000 bond. In 2008, Taiwan's Criminal Investigation Bureau looked into a total of 102 illegal betting allegations in the CPBL, which involved a total of 222 suspects.
- In 2009, another match-fixing scandal hit the Chinese Professional Baseball League (CPBL). Following the season, allegations arose that the Brother Elephants—one of Taiwan's most popular baseball clubs—had accepted money to lose during that year's Taiwan Series against the Uni-President 7-11 Lions. By the end of a prosecutor's investigation, 23 Elephants players had been named as being in on the fix, including pitcher Chin-hui Tsao, who was the first Taiwanese pitcher to play in Major League Baseball. Tsao denies having any involvement with match-fixings. In 2009, President of the Republic of China Ma Ying-jeou convinced a meeting to address the systemic match fixing problems in the CPBL after numerous incidents. Penalties for match-fixing were re-written to mirror the laws governing lotteries, which called for up to 10 years in prison for fraud.
- During the 2012 and 2013 Major League Baseball seasons, allegations were made by gambler Kris Barr that he was in on fixing Pittsburgh Pirates games with pitcher Jeff Locke. After an investigation, it was found that Barr had no contact with Locke relating to fixing games. Instead, Barr felt slighted by Locke—whom he knew from youth baseball—and created an elaborate story to damage his reputation. The Center for Investigative Reporting and Sports Illustrated released the details of the events on August 18, 2014, which included reporting on the aggressive tactics of the MLB investigators led by retired New York Police Department officer Rick Burnham. Locke recalled that the MLB investigators told him that they had proof that he was in on fixing games and pressured him to confess, in spite of his pleas of innocence and the fact the investigators presented no proof.
- In 2016, South Korean police released information about an alleged match-fixing scheme in the Korea Baseball Organization (KBO) dating back to 2014 that involved 21 people—three of whom played in the KBO. Pitchers Chang-sik Yoo and Sung-min Lee were named by police in the probe and one player was identified only by his surname 'Kim'.

== Basketball ==
- In 1946, Brooklyn College players admitted to conspiring to fix an upcoming game set to take place on January 31, 1945, against the University of Akron. Brooklyn players Henry Rosen and Harvey Stemmer were convicted of "conspiracy to cheat and defraud" on May 9, 1945. Stemmer was immediately sentenced to one year in the state penitentiary and a $500 fine. Rosen was sentenced on May 16 and in spite of the jury's request that the World War II veteran receive leniency Judge Louis Goldstein also sentenced Rosen to one year in the state penitentiary. His sentence was reduced to 15 to 30 months in state prison by Manhattan's General Sessions Court Judge Gould Schurman Jr. a month later.
- In 1951, in the 1951 college basketball point-shaving scandal, District Attorney Frank Hogan indicted college basketball players for point-shaving from four different New York colleges and universities, including CCNY, Manhattan College (now known as Manhattan University), New York University, and Long Island University, with student-athletes from three other universities outside of the state in the University of Toledo, Bradley University, and the University of Kentucky also being involved.
- In 1961, Joseph Hacken and Aaron Wagman were arrested in New York for arranging fixes of college basketball games. The fixed games according to New York District Attorney Frank Hogan were the Connecticut–Colgate game in Hamilton, New York and the Seton Hall–Dayton game at Madison Square Garden in New York City. Their arrests were a small part of a larger scheme led by former NBA All-Star Jack Molinas within the 1961 NCAA University Division men's basketball gambling scandal that also affected at least 37 student-athletes from 22 different colleges, with around 50 people associated with the scandal being permanently banned by the NBA, though it's claimed that hundreds more players alongside 43 other college basketball games might have been controlled behind the scenes as well.
- In 1978–79, mobsters connected with the New York Lucchese crime family, among them Henry Hill and Jimmy Burke, organized a point shaving scheme with key members of the Boston College basketball team.
- In 1981, the Federal Bureau of Investigation (FBI) announced they were looking into allegations of point shaving during three Big Eight Conference basketball games in February 1981. The United Press International reported that the three games being investigated were Kansas at Missouri on February 9, Oklahoma State at Colorado on February 14 and Nebraska at Missouri on February 21. No further allegations were made and nothing materialized from the FBI investigation.
- In 1985, Tulane University (New Orleans, Louisiana) players were involved in a point shaving scheme that led to the disbandment of the program for four years.
- In 1987, Phoenix Police investigated allegations that unidentified members of the Phoenix Suns NBA team were bribed with cocaine in exchange for shaving points. The game in question was the February 21, 1987 Suns game against the Milwaukee Bucks. Handicappers from the Stardust Resort and Casino and Churchill Downs testified to a Maricopa County grand jury that there were no suspicious wagers placed on the game.
- In 1994, a comprehensive point shaving scheme organized by campus bookmaker Benny Silman and involving players from the Arizona State University men's basketball team was uncovered with the assistance of Las Vegas bookmakers, who grew suspicious over repeated large wagers being made against Arizona State.
- In April 2011, a U.S. federal grand jury in San Diego indicted a group of 10 individuals on charges of running a point shaving scheme affecting an as yet-undetermined number of college basketball games. Three of the accused had ties to the University of San Diego's men's basketball team—one was then the team's all-time leader in points and assists; another was a former player; and the third was a former assistant. Games at the University of California, Riverside, where the second indicted player also played, were also mentioned as potentially being fixed.
- In 2015, South Korean police announced they were investigating alleged match fixing in the Korean Basketball League, which involved a total of 11 players with at least one of them suspected of intentionally missing shots in an attempt to change the outcome of a game. The other players in the investigation had allegedly placed wagers on sports betting websites.
- On 22 January 2016, ESPN reporter Brian Windhorst broke the news on Bomani Jones's show, that players from the NBA team the Cleveland Cavaliers threw a regular season game against the Portland Trail Blazers in an attempt to get head coach David Blatt fired.
- In 2017, eight members of the Siliwangi Bandung in the Indonesian Basketball League were expelled from the league for fixing at least four games. Danny Kosasih, chairman of the Indonesian Basketball Association, said he received proof of the match fixing through recorded audio conversations of the players involved.
- In 2017, allegations arose that the Red Bull Korea amateur three-on-three basketball tournament was fixed for the South Korean team, 'Project X', to win. According to the allegations published in The Korea Times, the other South Korean teams competing in the tournament colluded to make sure Project X beat out the foreign teams. The Times alleged this was possible because of the tournament's rules that added the team's points up to determine the winner instead of a traditional elimination tournament. The opposing South Korean teams let Project X run up the score during their contests to game the overall outcome of the tournament, according to the Times. Red Bull Korea denied having any part in the alleged scheme.

== Boxing ==
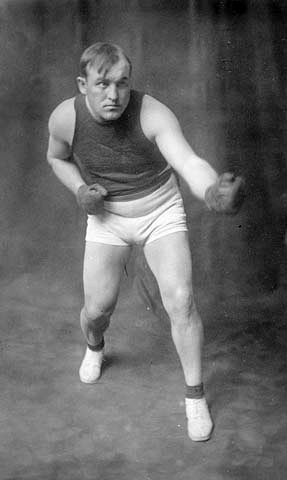
Heavyweight boxer Arthur Pelkey alleged his manager Tommy Burns (pictured) arranged a fixed fight on March 26, 1913.

- The Olympic boxing champion of 388 BC, Eupolus of Thessaly, was accused of bribing his opponents Agetor of Arcadia, Prytanis of Cyzicus and the previous champion Phormio of Halicarnassus. All four men were fined and six bronze Zeus statues (two by Cleon) were raised along with descriptions of their infractions. Pausanias wrote that it was thought this was the first scandal of its kind to affect the Olympic Games. Using fines paid by cheaters for bronzes of Zeus became a lasting trend.
- In 125, Didas took a dive for Sarapammon at the Olympic Games in exchange for a bribe. Both men were from Arsinoites and were fined.
- In 1890, a San Francisco Call correspondent accused boxer George Mulholland of taking a dive during a match against Wiley Evans in San Jose, California.
- In September 1913, heavyweight boxer Arthur Pelkey, who was the reigning World White Heavyweight Champion, submitted a signed letter to Roscoe Fawcett, sports editor of The Oregonian, which stated that he was involved in a fixed match on March 26, 1913, in Calgary, Alberta, Canada under the direction of his manager Tommy Burns. Pelkey further alleged that Burns made the heavyweight sign over fifty percent of his earnings when he was in police custody awaiting a determination by the coroner if he was responsible for the in-ring death of his opponent Luther McCarty on May 24, 1913. McCarty's death was eventually ruled unrelated to that match and Pelkey continued his boxing career with Burns as his manager.
- On September 22, 1922, at the Vélodrome Buffalo in Paris, France, the reigning World Light Heavyweight Champion Georges Carpentier took on Battling Siki in what was supposed to be a fixed fight, according to Siki. During the fight, Carpentier went back on a previous arrangement to not hurt Siki, although it is debated by Smithsonian.com writer Gilbert King whether or not Carpentier was in on the fix or if it was arranged by someone from his corner without his knowledge. Siki then decided to fight Carpenter without letting up, but was eventually disqualified in a controversial decision by referee M. Henri Bernstein. Later the decision was reversed and Siki was crowned the World Light Heavyweight Champion.
- On December 15, 1923, following a match between Frankie Schoell and Dave Shade, referee Dave Miller told reporters he was offered $500 to fix the match in favor of Schoell.
- November 17, 1924: Boxers Fred Fulton and Tony Fuente were accused of fixing a fight in Los Angeles. The match lasted 35 seconds with Fuente throwing two punches. It was the last match fought under state rules that prohibited boxers from winning cash prizes.
- In 1938, heavyweight boxer Al "Big Boy" Bray told the California State Athletic Commission that he was offered a $1,000 bribe to take a dive against Chuck Crowell, which took place at Grand Olympic Auditorium in Los Angeles, California. Bray said the bribe was offered by boxing promoter Suey Welch and Crowell's manager Baron Henry von Stumme.
- On January 29, 1939, heavyweight boxer Harry Thomas confessed that he participated in two fixed matches. The first was on December 13, 1937, against Max Schmeling in which Thomas lost by technical knockout (TKO) in the eight round. The second fight took place on November 14, 1938, against Tony Galento in which Thomas was defeated by TKO in the third round. Thomas was paid $8,500 for fixing the Schmeling fight and $23,000 for fixing the Galento fight.
- In 1947, grand jury proceedings in New York revealed a plot to fix a match between Rocky Graziano and Ruben Shank that was scheduled for December 27, 1946. Graziano called the match off on Christmas Eve saying he had developed a "mild sacroiliac condition".
- In 1949, the Michigan Boxing Commission investigated a fight between welterweights Kid Gavilán and Lester Felton, which resulted in a split 2–1 decision for Felton. Gavilán told commission he believed the referee helped Felton fix the match.
- In 1954, it was reported by Sports Illustrated that welterweight boxer Vince Martinez was offered $20,000 to lose to Carmine Fiore in a televised match on October 29 at Madison Square Garden in New York City. Martinez ended up winning the bout and was escorted to New Jersey for his safety by members of District Attorney Frank Hogan's staff in a prearranged deal for information on the people who tried to fix the match.
- Also in 1954, heavyweight boxer Clarence Henry was arrested and charged with bribery for allegedly offering middleweight boxer Bobby Jones $15,000 to throw his fight against Joey Giardello on June 11 at Madison Square Garden.
- In 1955, California Governor Goodwin J. Knight created an investigative committee to look into allegations of match fixing in boxing. The following year, the committee convened a hearing where it was revealed they had evidence that boxing promoter Babe McCoy had fixed seven fights dating back to 1950.
- In December 1957, boxer Dick Goldstein told the National Boxing Association that Art Aragon had approached him before their upcoming match and offered him $500 to take a dive. Goldstein refused and Aragon called off the fight, telling the Texas Athletic Commission he was ill. Aragon was convicted of criminal conspiracy for his part in the scheme and was sentenced to one to five years in a California State Prison.
- Both Muhammad Ali vs. Sonny Liston fights in 1964 and 1965 were suspected of being fixed, but the allegations were never proven.
- On June 26, 1976, the Muhammad Ali vs. Antonio Inoki match at the Nippon Budokan in Tokyo, Japan resulted in a 15-round draw. Both sides agreed to the match under the assumption it would be a fixed exhibition. The two fighters could not agree on who would win the fight, so the match became genuine.
- In 1986, the Aftenposten in Oslo, Norway reported that Norwegian heavyweight boxer Steffen Tangstad had fought Uruguayan boxer Alfredo Evangelista in a fixed match. Evangelista told Aftenposten that he agreed to lose the fight as long as he was not knocked down and was paid $6,000 for his cooperation.
- In 1993, Sports Illustrated reported that several fights arranged by boxing promoter Rick "Elvis" Parker were fixed according to boxer Sonny Barch, who claimed he was approached by Parker and told to lose the fight against Randall "Tex" Cobb scheduled on September 15, 1993. Cobb knocked out Barch in the first-round. Barch also claimed to have knowledge of another fix which occurred on the same card as his fight between football player turned boxer Mark Gastineau and Rick Hoard. In that match, Gastineau won by a technical knockout in the first round. Cobb denied the claims and sued Sports Illustrated for libel. He was awarded $10.7 million by a federal jury in 1999. The verdict was reversed on appeal on January 31, 2002.
- In 2006, Japan Today circulated rumors that the Juan Landaeta vs. Koki Kameda fight was fixed, but pointed out there was no evidence to support the allegations.
- In 2010, a match between cruiserweights Paul Briggs and Danny Green was declared fixed following an investigation by WA Professional Combat Sports Commission. Green was exonerated by the investigation, but Briggs, who was knocked out 29 seconds into the first round, was found to have purposefully taken a dive. The findings of the investigation were overturned in 2012 by three judges of the High Court of Australia.
- At the 2012 Summer Olympics, a match result was overturned and the referee was expelled from the tournament after a very controversial decision which included a boxer winning the match despite having been knocked down five times in one round, in violation of amateur boxing regulations. Olympic-style boxing enforces the standing eight count, mandatory eight count, and three knockdown rule, when many professional boxing officials do not observe the three knockdown rule. Eleven months earlier, BBC reported on a possible bribery attempt, which could be related.
- During the 2016 Summer Olympics, Sports Illustrated reported that several boxing judges and referees were dismissed by the International Boxing Association due to suspect decisions.
- On December 31, 2018, boxer Floyd Mayweather Jr. faced rising kickboxer and mixed martial artist Tenshin Nasukawa in an exhibition boxing match for the Japanese promotion Rizin Fighting Federation's Rizin 14 event. After Mayweather easily dominated Nasukawa in under two and a half minutes, which saw Nasukawa "comically" stumbling around the ring after each knockdown and Mayweather even dancing in the middle of the ring, both fans and pundits began accusing the fight of being fixed – although no evidence was ever found.

== Cricket ==
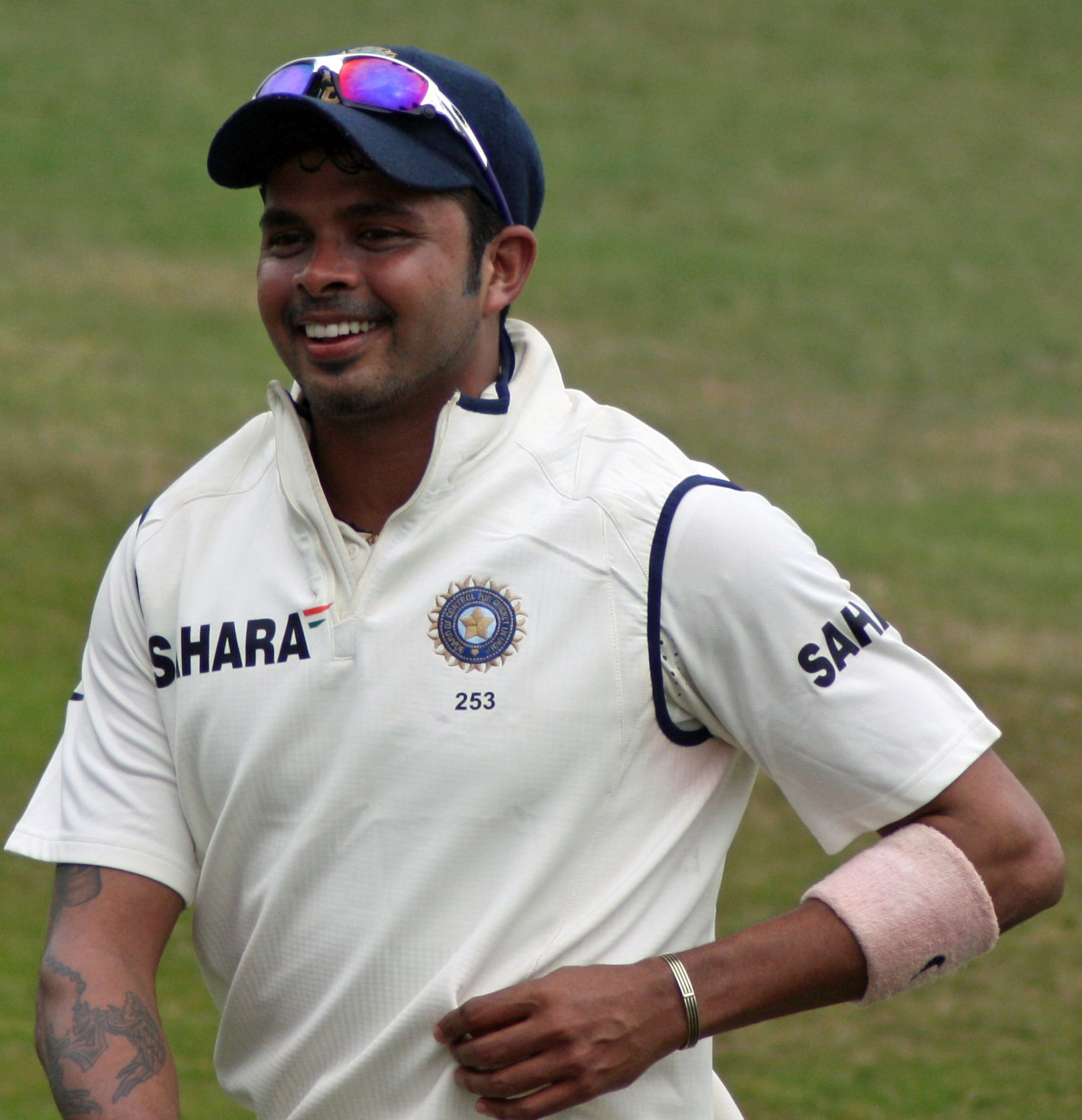
Indian cricketer S. Sreesanth received a lifetime ban in 2013 for his alleged part in a match-fixing scheme.

- In 1979, Somerset deliberately declared their innings in their Benson & Hedges Cup one-day match against Worcestershire closed after only one over was completed. This plan was not motivated by gambling, but was instead meant to manipulate tie-breaking rules for Somerset's benefit and assure qualification for the quarterfinals of the tournament. Although the plan was not against the letter of the rules, it was widely condemned by both media and cricket officials, and Somerset was expelled from that year's tournament in response.

- In 2000 the Delhi police intercepted a conversation between a blacklisted bookie and the South African cricket captain Hansie Cronje in which they learnt that Cronje accepted money to throw matches. The South African government refused to allow any of its players to face the Indian investigation unit, which opened up a can of worms. A court of inquiry was set up and Cronje admitted to throwing matches. He was immediately banned from all cricket. He also named Saleem Malik (Pakistan), Mohammed Azharuddin and Ajay Jadeja (India). Jadeja was banned for 4 years. They too were banned from all cricket. As a kingpin, Cronje exposed the dark side of betting, however with his untimely death in 2002 most of his sources also have escaped law enforcement agencies. Two South African cricketers, Herschelle Gibbs and Nicky Boje, are also wanted by the Delhi police for their role in the match fixing saga. A few years before in 1998, Australian players Mark Waugh and Shane Warne were fined for revealing information about the 'weather' to a bookmaker.
- The fourth Test of Pakistan's summer 2010 cricket tour of England contained several incidents of spot fixing, involving members of the Pakistan team deliberately bowling no-balls at specific points to facilitate the potential defrauding of bookmakers. Three players were banned from cricket and sentenced to prison terms.
- In Indian Premier League in 2013, S. Sreesanth and two other players were banned by the Board of Control for Cricket in India for alleged match fixing. Sreesanth's ban was briefly lifted, but the Kerala High Court upheld the ban in 2017. Sreesanth maintains his innocence and is appealing his ban. After the Supreme Court of India set aside Sreesanth's life ban in 2019 and asked the BCCI to revisit the length of the ban, the BCCI reduced Sreesanth's ban to seven years; the ban expired in September 2020.
- In the 2012 Champions League T20 in South Africa, New Zealand cricketer Lou Vincent was reported to have fixed matches for Auckland Aces in the qualifiers against English side Hampshire Cricket Club, and again in the main stage against reigning Indian champions Kolkata Knight Riders.

== Darts ==
- In June 2018, Filipino darts player Gilbert Ulang was found by the Darts Regulation Authority to have deliberately lost to Kevin Simm in the preliminary round of the 2017 PDC World Darts Championship. Ulang was given a seven-year suspension from the sport.
- In 2020, Northern Irish darts player Kyle McKinstry was suspended by the Darts Regulation Authority for alleged match fixing in matches against Wessel Nijman and David Evans in the Modus A Night at the Darts event. Wessel Nijman was suspended for fixing a game against Evans in the same event. Nijman admitted to the offence; and McKinstry admitted to the offence against Evans but denied the offence against Nijman. McKinstry was found by the DRA to have fixed both matches. Nijman was suspended for five years, the latter two-and-a-half suspended; while McKinstry was banned for eight years.
- In 2023, Andy Jenkins, Jack Main, and Prakash Jiwa were suspended for possible involvement in match-fixing at the MODUS Super Series. Indian darts player Prakash Jiwa lost his 2024 PDC World Darts Championship qualification due to the suspension. In 2024, English darts player Jack Main later received a two-year ban after suspicious betting patterns during his 4–0 defeat to Lisa Ashton. In 2025 Jenkins and Jiwa were banned for eleven and eight years, respectively, for match fixing.
- In 2024, Leighton Bennett and Billy Warriner were banned for eight and ten years, respectively, after pleading guilty for Bennett having fixed four matches in the MODUS Super Series in September 2023 in order to benefit Warriner, who was betting on the matches and would later act as Bennett's agent while unregistered.

== Esports ==
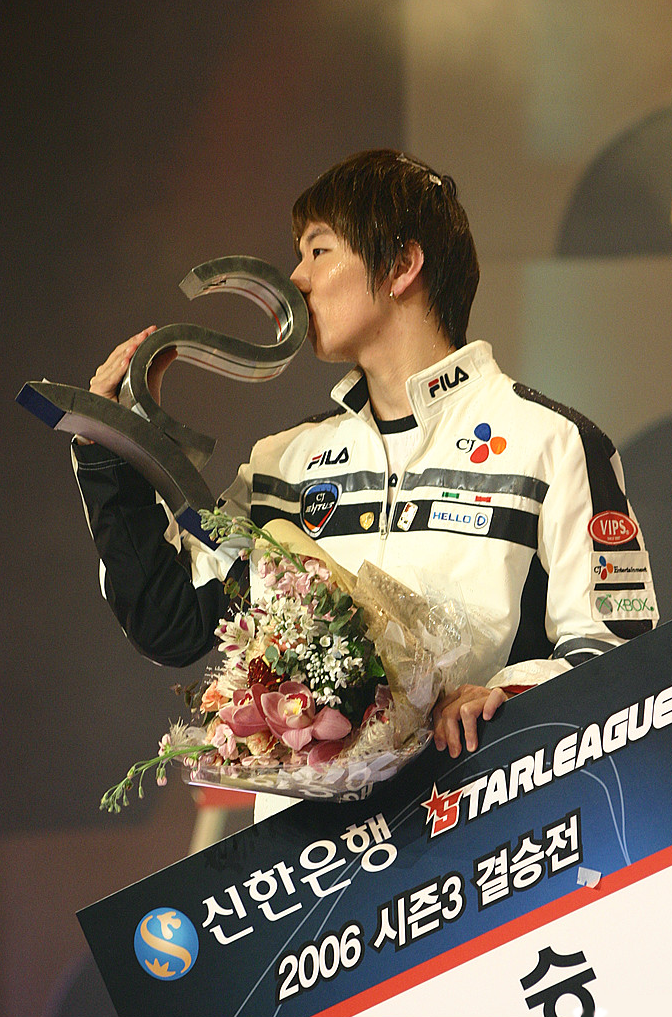
Esports player Ma Jae-Yoon was implicated in a 2010 StarCraft match-fixing scandal

- In 2010, several professional StarCraft players were suspected of being involved in illegal match fixing, with two people arrested and about seven gamers investigated, with two renowned gamers, Ma Jae-Yoon and By. CrocuS were confirmed as working as a broker between the bettors and the gamers.
- In June 2013, a Dota 2 pro player Alexey "Solo" Berezin was caught match fixing during a match against ZRage in SLTV Star Ladder Season VI as RoX.Kis. The match had no bearing on their standings since both teams could no longer qualify for the LAN finals. Solo bet $100 against his team and proceed to intentionally throw the game and supposedly won $322 from it. As a result of being caught Solo received a lifetime ban from Starladder (later reduced to one year and was later removed from the team), a three-year ban for the other players, and one-year ban for the organization.
- In October 2014, Dota 2 pro players Kok Yi "ddz" Liong and Fua Hsien "Lance" Wan were both found guilty of match fixing during the match against CSW on Synergy SEA as Arrow Gaming as it has been found that both of their girlfriends have betted expensive quality items against their team where they proceed to intentionally throw the match. Arrow Gaming repeatedly tried to deny this but conclusive evidence eventually proves this fact and as a result, the teams have been removed from Synergy SEA and disqualified from other tournaments such as Summit 2. Both ddz and Lance were removed from the Arrow Gaming and the rest of the team disbanded one day later.
- In January 2015, six Counter-Strike: Global Offensive players and a team owner were banned due to the IBuyPower and NetcodeGuides match fixing scandal.
- In June 2021, six Valorant players for the team Resurgence were suspended for match fixing a match against Blackbird Ignis in September 2020.

== Field hockey ==
- In 1996, the International Hockey Federation released a report concluding there was no evidence to prove a match between India and Malaysia in an Olympic qualifying match in January. Canadian Hockey Association president Judy McCrae was publicly skeptical of the report and affirmed her belief that the game was fixed.
- In 2006, the Malaysia national field hockey team filed a complaint through the Olympic Council of Malaysia that Japan and Pakistan intentionally tied 0–0 during their match at the 2006 Asian Games.

== Golf ==
The illusion of, but not legally match fixing, occurred in December 1959 when Sam Snead had legitimately lost to Mason Rudolph on the NBC show World Championship Golf because of an error on Snead's part. At the 12th hole with the match tied, Snead discovered that he was carrying 15 clubs in his bag in violation of Rule 3 with the 14 club limit.

Under the Rules of Golf in effect at the time, the general penalty was assessed for each hole the 15th club was in the bag. As this was a match play event, the general penalty is a loss of hole; in stroke play, the penalty is two penalty strokes for each hole the extra club was in the bag. There was no limit to the number of general penalties that could be assessed.

With the score even on the 12th hole, the match officially ended after Snead's eleven loss of hole penalties, with Rudolph winning 11 and 7. Instead of disclosing the violation, Snead continued to play, but purposefully missed putts to give Rudolph the victory. Snead said his decision to continue was because he knew the NBC show would be an hour short of the planned run time and he wanted to give the producers a usable broadcast that showed Rudolph the winner, although viewers would not be informed of the violation that legitimately ended the match at the 12th, creating the illusion that Rudolph won a fair match when in actuality, Rudolph had won upon Snead's discovery of his own infraction.

This match was broadcast in April 1960, shortly after Congressional hearings into the quiz show scandals after it was discovered major big-money quiz shows were fixed, leading to the cancellation of such programs across all broadcast networks. Modern game shows state the disclaimer, "Portions of the Program not affecting the outcome have been edited and/or recreated" when edits are used for time constraints, or when incidents require parts of the program not affecting the outcome to be reshot. Snead began missing puts to stage the official outcome of the match, Rudolph winning, after the match had legally concluded' at the 12th hole.

This incident led to a revision of the Rules of Golf that went into effect in 1964 to correct the problem caused by this incident by limiting the number of general penalties assessed for having an additional club to two penalties in a round as a score adjustment. The rule is listed as Rule 4.1.b in the current edition of the USGA Rules of Golf. With the post-1964 rule, the score would be adjusted at the 12th hole from tied to Rudolph leading by two holes (2 up) after the maximum penalty of a two-hole adjustment was assessed. Snead would have to make up a two-hole deficit with seven holes remaining.

For legal reasons, this was not match fixing, since the outcome of the match was determined when Snead "recreated" under modern legal terminology the result following Rudolph's legitimate 11 and 7 win after 11 loss of hole penalties for the infraction to show the legitimate result, a Rudolph win.

The rule Snead violated has occurred at professional golf events, all in stroke play.

- 2001 Open Championship: Ian Woosnam, two strokes, found before starting second hole (one penalty since he had not started second hole).
- 2013 PGA Championship: Woody Austin, four strokes, found on third hole.
- 2024 Shriners Children's Open in Las Vegas: Joel Dahmen, four strokes, found on fourth hole.

== Handball ==
- In 2012, several French handball players from the Montpellier club were arrested on allegations they fixed matches. In June 2015, the French government pressed charges against the alleged Montpellier fixers who included Olympic medalist Nikola Karabatić, his brother Luka Karabatic and six others Montpellier players. Prosecutors alleged Montpellier, who had already sealed the French handball championship, purposefully lost to Cesson in May 2012. French authorities were tipped off to the alleged fix when discovering that over €100,000 in bets had been placed on the low-stakes game that prosecutors contend should have only garnered a few thousand euros in wagers. In July 2015, the 16 people indicted by French authorities for their part in the match fixing scandal—including the Karabatic brothers—were found guilty. Nikola Karabatić was fined 10,000 euros and the largest fine on 30,000 euros went to Mladen Bojinovic. None of the people were given jail sentences, despite the prosecutors request. The Karabatic brothers appealed the decision and in 2017, but lost and a new ruling made by the Disciplinary Committee of the French Handball Federation required Nikola Karabatić to sit out six games and Luka Karabatic to sit out two.

== Motorsport ==
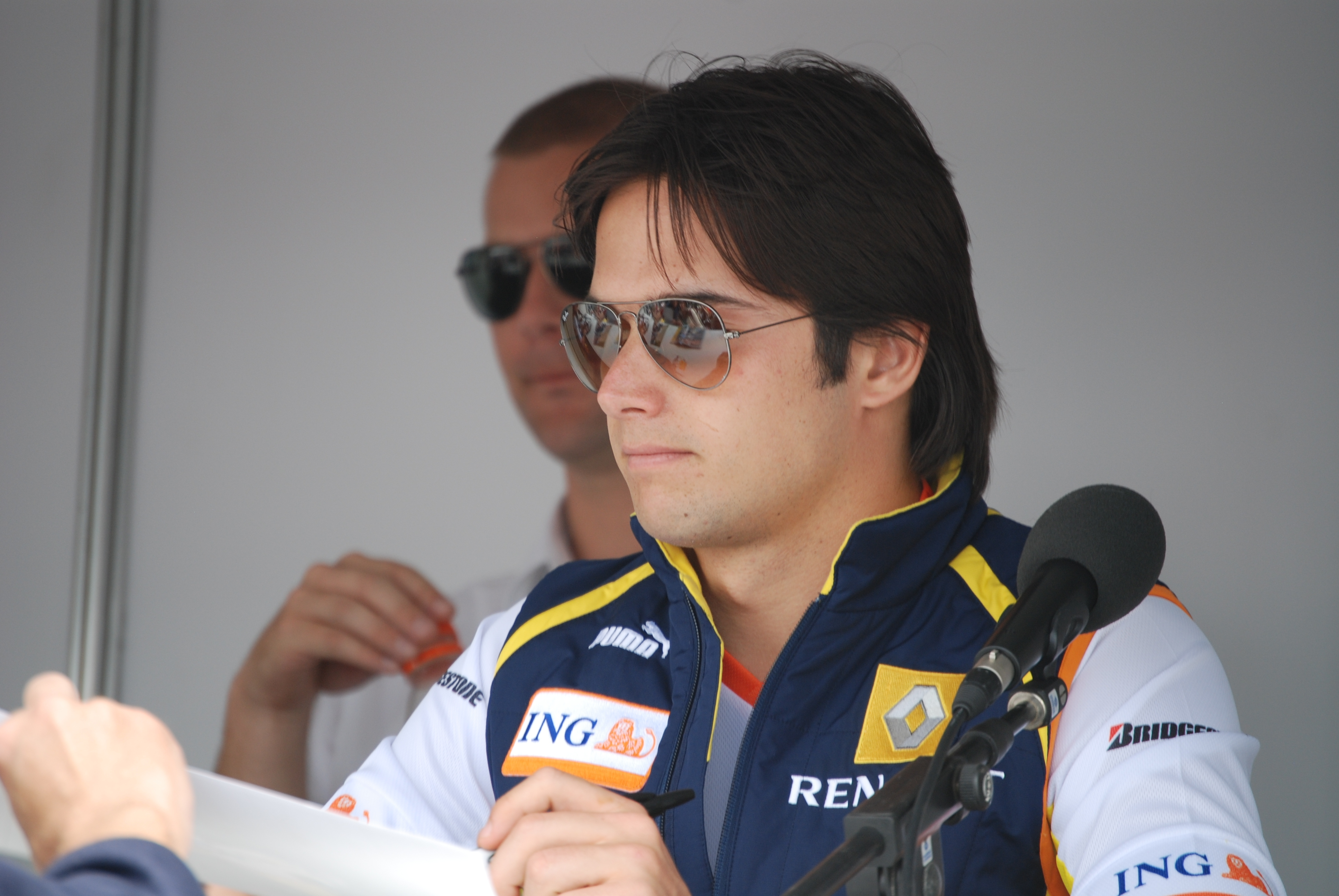
Nelson Piquet Jr. admitted to intentionally wrecking his Formula One car during a 2008 race.

- On September 25, 1969, flat track motorcycle racers in Japan were arrested for their involvement in a major match-fixing scandal in flat track, which is one of Japan's four public sports where wagering is legal. The result of this led to the Black Mist Scandal that affected both baseball and flat track.
- In September 2009, Formula 1 driver Nelson Piquet Jr. admitted to having intentionally crashed out of the 2008 Singapore Grand Prix due to team orders. It gave an advantage to his teammate Fernando Alonso who went on to win the race. Following a lawsuit by the Renault Formula 1 team against the Piquet family, a judge ruled in Piquet's favor due to overwhelming evidence against the team; fining the Renault Formula 1 team millions, liquidating various employees, banning the team from Formula 1 for 2 years (on suspended sentence) and various key members of Renault Formula 1 team being banned for life (which was later appealed). Alonso was found to have no knowledge at all of the scheme.

- In the NASCAR Cup Series, the 2013 Federated Auto Parts 400 was scandalized by extensive manipulation of the race results by three teams—Michael Waltrip Racing, Penske Racing, and Front Row Motorsports—in an attempt to ensure that MWR and Penske drivers would earn places in the Chase for the Sprint Cup. When the manipulation was discovered, NASCAR imposed unprecedented penalties that knocked Martin Truex Jr., one of the intended beneficiaries, out of the Chase, and also gave Jeff Gordon, an unwitting victim of the manipulation, a 13th place in the normally 12-driver Chase.
- In the NASCAR Cup Series, the 2019 Ford EcoBoost 400 was marred by race manipulation involving teams not having a Race Team Alliance charter, Premium Motorsports and Rick Ware Racing (with assistance from a chartered team in Spire Motorsports) in an attempt to ensure Premium would be the non-charter team with highest points in the team owner's standings. NASCAR penalized all teams involved in the scheme, handing the title of the highest placed non-charter team to Gaunt Brothers Racing.
- In Kyōtei (Japanese Inshore powerboat racing with parimutuel wagering), Masaki Nishikawa was found guilty of fixing powerboat races in September 2020 and sentenced to three years in prison and fined 37.25 million Japanese Yen for match fixing.

== Snooker ==
- In 2009, snooker player Stephen Maguire acknowledged through his management company that police had questioned him about allegations of match-fixing at the UK Championship in Telford, England on December 15, 2008.
- In 2010, allegations were made by the British newspaper News of the World that snooker champion John Higgins had accepted a £261,000 bribe from undercover reporters in Kyiv, Ukraine to throw frames. Higgins denied the bribery and match fixing allegations. During an investigation of the events, the World Professional Billiards and Snooker Association (WPBSA) placed Higgins on suspension. Later that year, a WPBSA endorsed tribunal found Higgins guilty of accepting a bribe but found no evidence of match fixing.
- In 2016, Irish snooker player Leo Fernandez was banned from the sport for 15 months by the World Professional Billiards and Snooker Association (WPBSA) for manipulating part of a match. While it was not a full manipulation of the match's outcome, Fernandez had contact with people that placed a prop bet which said he would choose to shoot the first foul shot of the game. Fernandez did opt to take the first foul shot, thus making the bet successful. The WPBSA ruled that was a violation of their corruption bylaws.
- On 1 December 2018, Chinese snooker players Yu Delu and Cao Yupeng were banned from the sport following a lengthy investigation by the World Professional Billiards and Snooker Association. Yupeng admitted to fixing three matches and is eligible for reinstatement on 24 November 2020. Delu, who admitted to fixing five matches, revived a 10-year nine-month ban. He is eligible for reinstatement on 24 February 2029.

== Tennis ==
- In 2007, French tennis player Arnaud Clément claimed he was offered a bribe to fix a match, which he turned down, but added, "I won't say where or under what circumstances". Clément feared divulging more details on the bribe would have negative consequences on his career.
- In 2008, the Association of Tennis Professionals cleared Russian tennis player Nikolay Davydenko from allegations that he fixed a match against Martín Vassallo Argüello in Poland in 2007. In 2016, an investigation found that several millions of dollars were placed on the match from Russian-based accounts. Leaked files to the joint BuzzFeed and BBC investigators found 82 instances were Davydenko had sent or received text messages from the suspected head of an Italian sports betting syndicate.
- On 18 January 2016, a joint BuzzFeed, Research Enquirer and BBC investigation reported alleged widespread match-fixing, which involve Northern Italian, Sicilian, and Russian betting syndicates, which included suspicious betting at major tournaments such as Wimbledon. The reporters examined betting incidents on a total of 26,000 matches.
- In June 2018, Argentinian tennis player Nicolas Kicker was banned from the sport for at least three years for match-fixing. According to an investigation by the Tennis Integrity Unit, Kicker knowingly participated in at least two fixed matches in 2015. The ruling prohibits Kicker from competing in or attending a sanctioned tennis match.
- In July 2018 Egyptian tennis player Karim Hossam received a lifetime ban for match fixing.
- In September 2019 Brazilian tennis player Diego Matos received a lifetime ban for match fixing.
- In May 2020 Egyptian tennis player Youssef Hossam received a lifetime ban for match fixing, as his brother Karim had two years prior.

== Volleyball ==
- During the qualifying period for the 2012 Summer Olympics, the Japan women's national volleyball team came under scrutiny for allegedly throwing a match against Serbia in order to get a better Olympic seeding. The Fédération Internationale de Volleyball cleared Japan in May 2012 and the team was allowed to compete in the Olympic Games.
- In 2012, the Korea Volleyball Federation expelled four South Korean volleyball players for life after its disciplinary panel found evidence they took part in fixing matches. A fifth player was suspected of being in on the fixes, but was not expelled due to limited evidence. Later that year evidence from South Korean prosecutors implicated 16 volleyball players involved in match-fixing schemes.
- In 2016, Fédération Internationale de Volleyball president Jizhong Wei released a statement following allegations by the Thai women's national volleyball team that Japan had fixed an Olympic qualifying match. Wei said there was no evidence of match-fixing.

== Wrestling ==
- In 12 BC, Polyctor of Elis and Sosander of Smyrna were to wrestle one another at the Olympic Games, but Polyctor's father Damonicus was caught bribing Sosander's father, Sosander. The fathers were fined for this incident, and the sons were not punished.
- In 267, a contract between the teenage wrestling finalists at the 138th Great Antinoeia in Antinoöpolis stipulated that Demetrius would take a dive for his opponent Nicantinous, for 3,800 drachmae. The contract was found c. 1900, in an ancient landfill near Oxyrhynchus.
