= Louisville Grays all-time roster =

List of baseball players

The Louisville Grays were a professional baseball team that played in the National League for two seasons from 1876 to 1877. The franchise used Louisville Baseball Park as their home field. During their two seasons of existence, the team had a record of 65–61.

== Players ==
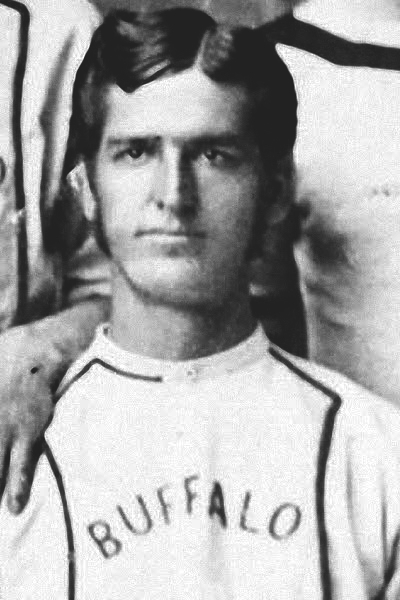
Shortstop Chick Fulmer

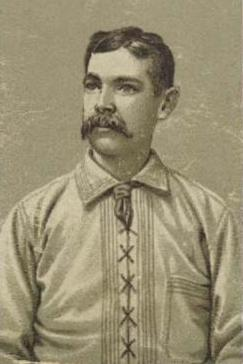
Second baseman Joe Gerhardt

Players who played for the Louisville Grays, primary position played, and season(s) played for franchise
Player	Position(s)	Season(s)	Notes	Ref
Art Allison	Right fielder	1876		
George Bechtel	Right fielder	1876		
John Carbine	First baseman	1876		
Jack Chapman	Right fielder	1876	Chapman was the Grays' manager.	
Jim Clinton	Right fielder	1876		
Dan Collins	Right fielder	1876		
Bill Craver	Shortstop	1877		
Bill Crowley	Center fielder	1877		
Jim Devlin	Pitcher	1876–1877	Devlin started 129 of the Grays' 130 games, winning 65 of them.	
Chick Fulmer	Shortstop	1876	Fulmer led the Grays in RBI in 1876.	
Joe Gerhardt	Second baseman / First baseman	1876–1877	Gerhardt led the Grays in RBI in 1877.	
Bill Hague	Third baseman	1876–1877		
John Haldeman	Second baseman	1877		
George Hall	Left fielder	1877	Hall led the Grays in batting average and runs scored in 1877.	
Scott Hastings	Center fielder	1876		
Bill Holbert	Catcher	1876		
Flip Lafferty	Center fielder	1877		
Juice Latham	First baseman	1877		
Harry Little	Second baseman	1877		
Al Nichols	Second baseman	1877		
Frank Pearce	Pitcher	1876		
Johnny Ryan	Left fielder	1876		
Orator Shafer	Right fielder	1877		
Pop Snyder	Catcher	1876–1877		
Ed Somerville	Second baseman	1876		
