= List of people banned from Major League Baseball =

A ban from Major League Baseball is a form of punishment levied by the Office of the Commissioner of Major League Baseball (MLB) against a player, manager, executive, or other person connected with the league as a denunciation of some action that person committed deemed to have violated the integrity of the game and/or otherwise tarnished its image. A banned person is forbidden from employment with MLB or its affiliated minor leagues, and is forbidden from other professional involvement with MLB such as acting as a sports agent for an MLB player.

Since 1991, all banned people, whether living or deceased, have been barred from induction to the Baseball Hall of Fame. However, on May 13, 2025, commissioner Rob Manfred ruled that the MLB's punishment on people banned from the league ultimately ends when a person dies as they can no longer represent a threat to the game upon death; as such, the banning of individuals now expires upon their deaths, with eligible contenders for the Hall of Fame including Pete Rose, Shoeless Joe Jackson, and Eddie Cicotte now considered eligible for entry by as early as 2027.

Major League Baseball has maintained an official list of "permanently ineligible" people since Kenesaw Mountain Landis was installed as the first Commissioner of Baseball in 1920. Although the majority of banned persons were banned after the establishment of the Commissioner's office, some were formally banned prior to that time while a few others were informally "blacklisted" by the Major League clubs. Most persons who have been banned (including many who have been reinstated) were banned due to association with gambling or otherwise conspiring to fix the outcomes of games; others have been banned for a multitude of reasons including illegal activities off the field, violating some term of their playing contract, or making disparaging remarks that brought the game into disrepute.

== History ==
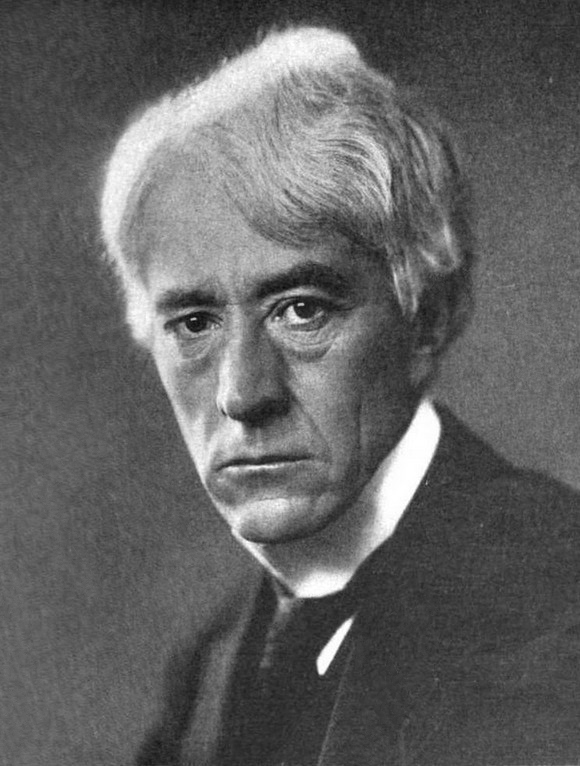
Kenesaw Mountain Landis, federal judge and Commissioner of Baseball (1920–44).

Prior to 1920, players were banned by the decision of a committee. There were 14 players banned from 1865 to 1920; of those, 12 were banned for association with gambling or attempting to fix games, one was banned for violating the reserve clause, and one was banned for making disparaging remarks.

In 1920, team owners established the Office of the Commissioner of Baseball, ostensibly to keep the players in line and out of corruption's way. Kenesaw Mountain Landis, a federal judge, was the owners' ideal candidate for the job. He demanded nearly unlimited power over every person in organized baseball down to the batboys, including the authority to ban people from the game. The owners, reeling from the fallout of the Black Sox Scandal, agreed.

Landis banned many players and various others, often for seemingly small offenses, and at times almost indiscriminately. In his 24 years as commissioner, Landis banned more people than all of his successors combined. The last living person banned by Landis was William D. Cox, who died in 1989 at the age of 79.

In 1991, the National Baseball Hall of Fame and Museum voted to bar banned players from induction.

By the 21st century, the use of performance enhancing drugs had replaced the possible influence of gambling as the greatest perceived threat to the integrity of the game. Subsequently, both the Commissioner of Baseball and the Major League Baseball Players Association came under intense pressure from fans, owners, current and former players, team officials, and the United States Congress to take decisive action against PED use in baseball. In 2005, as a result of the findings of the Mitchell Report, the owners and the MLBPA reached a new Basic Agreement which stipulated that multiple violations of the overhauled Major League Baseball drug policy would result in a lifetime ban.

On September 30, 2024, at the age of 83, Pete Rose became the first player to die while still ineligible after being banned by one of Landis' successors. Rose's permanent ban remains among the most bitterly debated of any imposed after Landis' tenure: while Rose eventually admitted to betting on his team (which under the rules then and now in force are grounds for permanent ineligibility), his supporters argue that a lifetime ban was unjust due to a lack of conclusive evidence that his gambling directly affected the outcome of any games, and also due to modern society's more relaxed attitude towards gambling.

On May 13, 2025, Commissioner Rob Manfred modified the lifetime ineligibility so that it would expire upon the banned person's death. In a letter addressing this policy change, Manfred stated that "a deceased individual cannot compromise the integrity of the game," and that the purposes of the rule instituting the policy are only relevant when a banned figure is alive. Manfred also acknowledged that political pressure from United States President Donald Trump was an influencing factor towards the rule change, as Trump had previously criticized MLB and the Baseball Writers' Association of America (BBWAA) on Pete Rose's exclusion from the Hall of Fame, going as far as to announce a posthumous pardon on February 28.

Following MLB's purge of all deceased players from the list, the oldest person ineligible is Roberto Alomar, who is 58 years old as of 2026.

== Punishment ==
=== Prohibited ===
A person who has been banned from Major League Baseball is barred from:

- employment with MLB, one of its affiliated minor leagues, or any Major League or Minor League Club, whether as a player, coach, or manager, or in the front office;
- acting as a sports agent for any Major League or Minor League player, coach, or manager;
- maintaining business ties with MLB or with any Major League or Minor League Club;
  - The exception to this is that MLB or any Major League or Minor League Club may invite banned persons to participate in events where said participation will not put the banned person(s) in a position where they could influence play (for example, an appearance at a public recognition ceremony). All such participation is subject to the approval of the Commissioner, who has the authority to deal with such requests on a case-by-case basis. The exact privileges that will be afforded for each special event is determined by the Commissioner–invariably, access to the clubhouse and related facilities by banned people will not be permitted. (This exception has evolved over the decades following the banishment of MLB's all-time hit leader Pete Rose in 1989. In the early years of Rose's ban, dispensations for special events were rarely granted. In recent years, especially since incumbent Rob Manfred's assumption of the office, special event dispensations for Rose became more frequent.)
- induction to the Hall of Fame, provided the person is living (rule change in 2025).
  - This prohibition is not the result of any MLB rule or policy (since the Hall of Fame falls outside the jurisdiction of the Commissioner's Office), but is a policy enforced by the Hall itself. Prior to the late 1980s, the Baseball Writers' Association of America and Veterans Committee each had an unwritten rule excluding banned people from consideration for election to the Hall. (The banishment of Rose necessitated a formalization of this policy prior to 1991 when Rose would otherwise have become eligible for election to the Hall.) Although Commissioner Bart Giamatti had stated at the time of Rose's ban that their agreement did not directly affect his Hall eligibility, he died before he could elaborate on the issue. Nevertheless, the Hall soon voted to formally exclude banned people from induction, a position that was endorsed by Giamatti's successor Fay Vincent. Similarly, in 2008, the Veterans Committee barred players and managers on the ineligible list from consideration. On the other hand, in his most recent statement affirming Rose's ban, Commissioner Manfred stated "It is not a part of my authority... to make any determination concerning Mr. Rose's eligibility as a candidate for election to the (Hall of Fame)... in my view, the considerations that should drive a decision on whether an individual should be allowed to work in Baseball are not the same as those that should drive a decision on Hall of Fame eligibility... any debate over Mr. Rose's eligibility for the Hall of Fame is one that must take place in a different forum." Notwithstanding Manfred's statements, the Hall of Fame's policies remain unchanged. How a ban imposed on an existing member of the Hall of Fame would affect that member in light of official Hall policy is not clear, although Roberto Alomar, who was inducted into the hall before his lifetime ban, remains enshrined (see below).

Prior to Rose's ban, two members of the Hall of Fame (Willie Mays and Mickey Mantle) were banned from baseball for associating with licensed casinos (with duties unrelated to sports betting). The Hall took no action as a result of these bans, which in any event were extremely controversial while they were in effect, and were rescinded long before the Hall policy was formalized. Since that time, Roberto Alomar has become the first Hall member to be banned from Major League Baseball. As of April 2025, Alomar remains enshrined in the Hall.

Terms such as "lifetime ban" and "permanent ban" are misnomers, as a banned person may be reinstated (i.e., have the ban removed) whether by the decision of the Commissioner of Major League Baseball or (in the case of players banned since the establishment of the Major League Baseball Players Association) following an appeal by the MLBPA on behalf of a banned player to an independent arbitrator empowered to hear and adjudicate such appeals. Furthermore, in the case of Hall of Fame induction, bans have typically extended beyond a person's lifetime. In the May 13, 2025 letter by the Commissioner to Jeffrey M. Lenkov of Zelms Erlich Lenkov, which represents the Rose family, Manfred stated:

In my view, a determination must be made regarding how the phrase ‘permanently ineligible’ should be interpreted in light of the purposes and policies behind Rule 21, which are to: (1) protect the game from individuals who pose a risk to the integrity of the sport by prohibiting the participation of such individuals; and (2) create a deterrent effect that reduces the likelihood of future violations by others. In my view, once an individual has passed away, the purposes of Rule 21 have been served. Obviously, a person no longer with us cannot represent a threat to the integrity of the game. Moreover, it is hard to conceive of a penalty that has more deterrent effect than one that lasts a lifetime with no reprieve. Therefore, I have concluded that permanent ineligibility ends upon the passing of the disciplined individual, and Mr. Rose will be removed from the permanently ineligible list.” While it is my preference not to disturb decisions made by prior Commissioners, Mr. Rose was not placed on the permanently ineligible list by Commissioner action but rather as the result of a 1989 settlement of potential litigation with the Commissioner's Office. My decision today is consistent with Commissioner Giamatti’s expectations of that agreement.

Despite this, a few people remained on the permanently ineligible list, including living people on the list, people who were banned prior to the creation of the office of Commissioner of Baseball, and a few who were banned by Landis that Manfred felt didn't deserve posthumous reinstatement.

The National Baseball Hall of Fame released a statement as part of the MLB statement announcing the purging of names from the Permanently Ineligible List on May 13, 2025.

The National Baseball Hall of Fame has always maintained that anyone removed from Baseball’s permanently ineligible list will become eligible for Hall of Fame consideration. Major League Baseball’s decision to remove deceased individuals from the permanently ineligible list will allow for the Hall of Fame candidacy of such individuals to now be considered. The Historical Overview Committee will develop the ballot of eight names for the Classic Baseball Era Committee – which evaluates candidates who made their greatest impact on the game prior to 1980 – to vote on when it meets next in December 2027.

=== Non-prohibited ===
Among the activities that a banned person is not precluded from participating (as of 2016) in include:

- Participating in baseball leagues that are not affiliated with MLB;
  - This was not the case for players banned by Commissioner Kenesaw Mountain Landis. Early on in Landis' tenure, the new Commissioner made it clear that anyone who knowingly played with or against any banned player would himself be banned from MLB for life. Landis' tenure was before the advent of the modern Minor League farm system, meaning that unlike his successors he lacked any formal jurisdiction outside the then-16 MLB clubs, moreover as Commissioner Landis repeatedly blocked the establishment of what would come to be known as the minor league system. Nevertheless, while Landis took actions which appeared to recognize and/or protect the independence of other leagues his uncompromising stance against banned players compelled every other professional league to honor MLB bans, and in effect gave Commissioner Landis the de facto power to completely exclude personnel from the game. However, some players banned by Landis are believed to have continued playing under assumed identities at the minor league or semi-professional level.
- Working for employers that themselves have business relationships with MLB and/or with a Major League or Minor League Club, provided the relationship does not result in a direct association with any Major League or Minor League Club and/or put the banned person in a position to influence baseball operations (for example, working for a national broadcaster that owns rights to MLB games);
  - During Landis' tenure, it was universally known that MLB would have immediately severed any relationship with an entity that employed personnel banned by MLB, and (at least until very recently), most such organizations have been extremely reluctant to offer employment to banned people for fear of generating negative publicity and/or out of concern that such employment might endanger their relationship with MLB. (MLB policy was articulated by Commissioner Manfred when, in reference to Rose, he stated "Major League Rules... do not cover relationships with third parties who do business with Major League Baseball. Any future relationship Mr. Rose may contemplate with any such party is a matter between him and the party, unless it involves any association with a Major League Club...")
- Working for an MLB or MiLB ownership group in an arrangement that keeps the banned person outside the organizational structure and uninvolved in the baseball operations of the Major League or Minor League Club in question (for example, working as an in-studio analyst for a broadcaster that owns the Major League club it holds the broadcasting rights for would be permitted);
- Entering any Major League or Minor League ballpark in the capacity of (and with only the privileges of) an ordinary spectator. However, MLB rules define the granting free entry to a game or any other event with paid admission as a "business relationship" that, subject to Commissioner-granted dispensations for special events as described above, would not be permitted. This means, among other things, that a banned person must normally purchase a ticket (or have one given to him by a party not affiliated with MLB) in order to attend a game.

== List of banned people ==
A banned person who has been posthumously reinstated by Major League Baseball is denoted with a cross at the end of their name.

=== Pre-1920 ===
These players were banned from baseball prior to the creation of the office of Commissioner of Baseball.

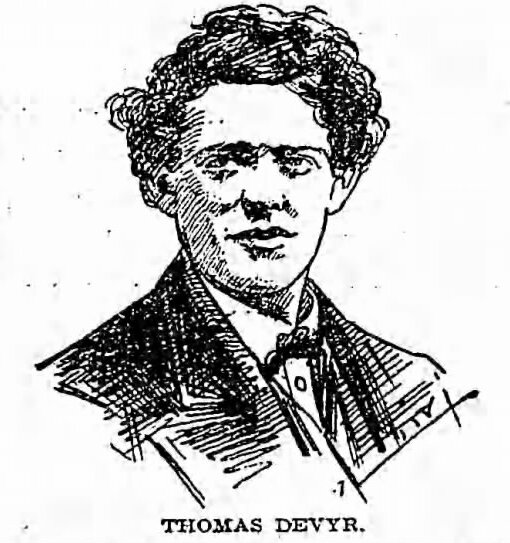
Thomas Devyr

- Thomas Devyr, Ed Duffy and William Wansley of the New York Mutuals were banned in 1865 for associating with known gamblers. Devyr was reinstated later that year, and Duffy and Wansley were reinstated in 1870.
- John Radcliff of the Chicago White Stockings was banned in 1874 after attempting to bribe umpire Billy McLean with $175 (about $5,000 in 2025) to help the White Stockings win. He was blacklisted but ultimately was reinstated and played the next year.
- George Bechtel of the Louisville Grays was banned in 1876 for conspiring with his teammates to intentionally lose a game for $500, equal to $15,100 in 2025. Bechtel was never reinstated; he died in 1921.
- Four players of the Louisville Grays were banned in 1877 for conspiring to throw two games in the Louisville Grays scandal.
  - Jim Devlin received up to $100 (about $3,000 in 2025) per game that he intentionally lost. Devlin died in 1883.
  - George Hall only admitted to throwing non-league games, despite his telegrams proving otherwise. Hall died in 1923.
  - Al Nichols was very remorseful about his role in the scandal, making many unsuccessful attempts to earn reinstatement. Nichols died in 1936.
  - Bill Craver. No evidence was ever found to suggest that Craver actually had anything to do with the conspiracy, but he refused to cooperate with the investigators and had a history of gambling and insubordination in his past. Craver died in 1901.
- Oscar Walker was banned in 1877 for "contract jumping" by signing a contract to play for another team while still under contract to the team he left. This was 98 years prior to the advent of free agency in sports; Walker was reinstated in 1879.

George Hall

- Lip Pike's play for Worcester in 1881 was so poor as to arouse suspicions, and Pike found himself the first professional player banned from the National League that September. He was added to the National League blacklist in 1881, and reinstated in 1883.
- Umpire and former outfielder Dick Higham was banned in 1882 for conspiring to help throw a Detroit Wolverines game after Detroit's owner hired a private investigator to check out Higham's background and found that he was an associate of a known gambler. Higham was never reinstated; he died in 1905. To date, Higham is the only umpire banned for life.
- Joseph Marie Creamer III, New York Giants team physician, was banned in 1908 for attempting to bribe umpire Bill Klem $2,500 (equal to $89,600 in 2025) to conspire against the Chicago Cubs during a playoff game against the Giants. Creamer died in 1918 and remains the only team physician (now athletic trainer) to be banned for life.

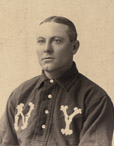
Jack O'Connor

- Jack O'Connor and Harry Howell, manager and coach of the St. Louis Browns, were banned in 1910 for attempting to fix the outcome of the 1910 American League batting title for Cleveland Indians player Nap Lajoie against Ty Cobb. Both were never reinstated.
- Horace Fogel, Philadelphia Phillies owner, was banned in 1912 for publicly asserting that the umpires favored the New York Giants and were making unfair calls against his team. Fogel was never reinstated; he died in 1928.

=== Unofficial-turned-official bans ===
These players were unofficially banned from baseball before the creation of the office of Commissioner of Baseball. They later had their bans made official by baseball's first Commissioner, Kenesaw Mountain Landis.

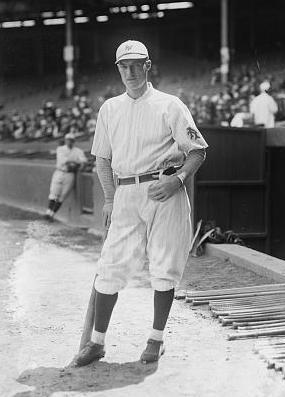
Heinie Zimmerman

- Joe Harris of the Cleveland Indians was banned in 1920 after he chose to play for an independent team rather than the Indians. Harris was reinstated by Landis in 1922 due to, in part, his service during World War I. Harris died in 1959.
- Hal Chase was effectively blacklisted from Major League Baseball in 1920, though Commissioner Kenesaw Mountain Landis never formally banned him and he was never convicted of any crime. Chase had been accused of fixing games as early as 1910, though no charges were filed. In 1914, he successfully challenged baseball's reserve clause in American League Baseball Club of Chicago v. Chase, with the court ruling that organized baseball operated as an illegal monopoly. Following this legal victory against White Sox owner Charles Comiskey, American League president Ban Johnson effectively blacklisted Chase from the American League. In 1918, Cincinnati Reds manager Christy Mathewson suspended Chase for alleged game-fixing and bribery. National League president John Heydler investigated the charges and in February 1919 found Chase not guilty, determining that the evidence was "general and unsubstantiated." Despite this exoneration, the Reds traded Chase to the New York Giants. In 1920, following former player Lee Magee's confession about gambling, the Giants released Chase. He was indicted in the Black Sox Scandal in 1920 but acquitted in 1921. While Landis declared after the Black Sox trial that anyone involved in throwing games would be banned, he never formally ruled on Chase's case. Since no team would sign him, Chase was effectively excluded from organized baseball. He died in 1947.
- Heinie Zimmerman of the New York Giants was banned in 1921 for encouraging his teammates to fix games. He had been benched by McGraw and later sent home during the 1919 season and had been informally banned from the majors. During the 1917 World Series, he chased the winning run across the plate and found himself having to deny having helped throw the Series. Despite some of these allegations, McGraw would not turn him in, not wanting to be the one responsible for having one of his players banned for life and suspended indefinitely. Later, McGraw testified in court that Zimmerman conspired to fix games. As with Chase, Landis' declaration after the Black Sox trial is also seen as formalizing Zimmerman's ban. Zimmerman died in 1969.

=== Banned under Commissioner Landis ===
Landis banned a total of nineteen people during his tenure, five more than all of his successors combined. Of the nineteen, two were re-instated by Landis, one was re-instated by a successor, and the other sixteen remained banned until well after their deaths. As a condition of accepting the Commissioner's post, Landis demanded and got nearly unlimited power to sanction every person employed in the major leagues, from owners to batboys. In practice, Landis only meted out punishment for serious off-field transgressions he believed were a threat to the image and/or integrity of the game. Disciplinary action for the on-field behavior of players, coaches and managers remained the responsibility of the respective league presidents, as it had been prior to the creation of the Commissioner's office.

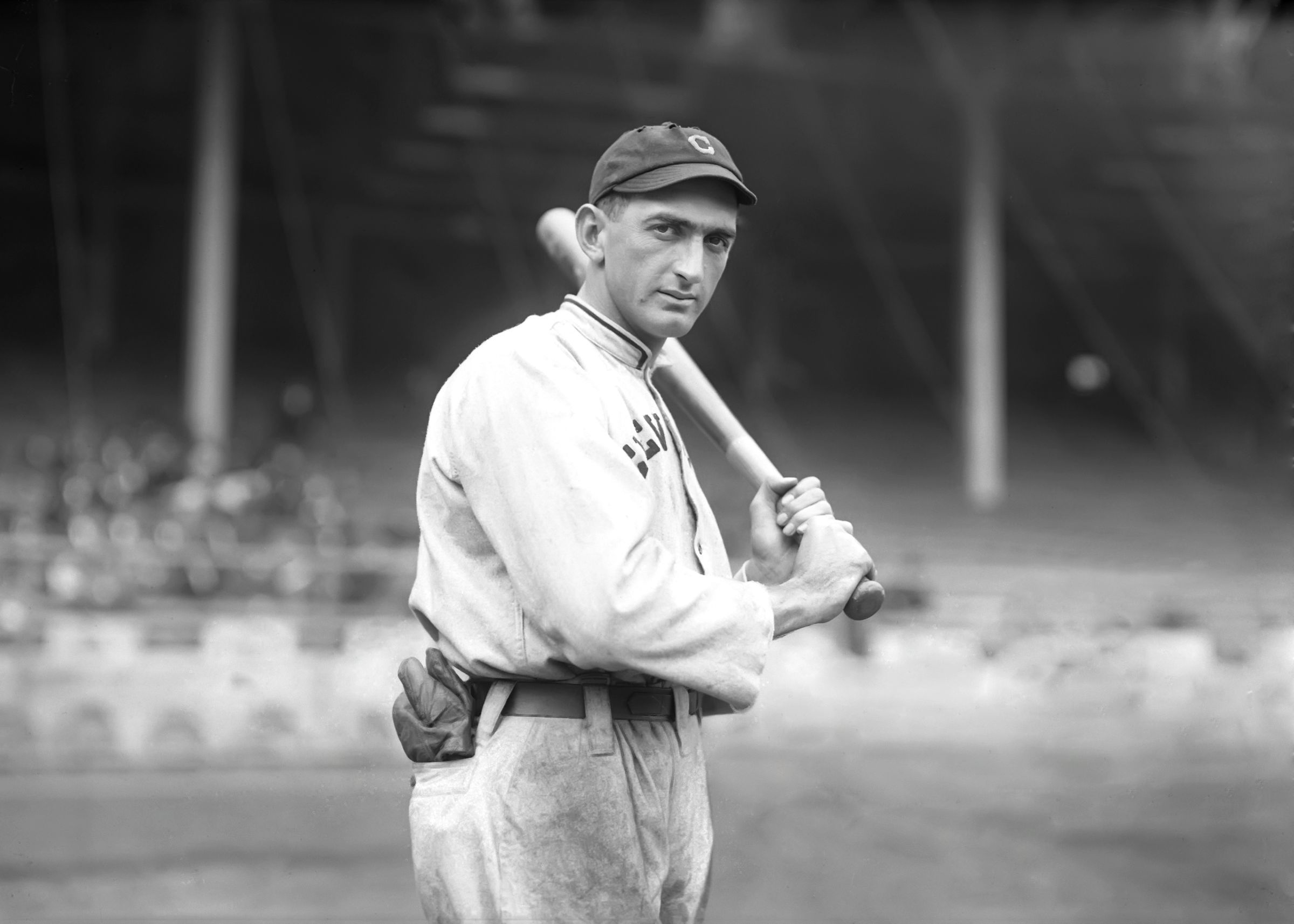
Shoeless Joe Jackson

Lefty Williams

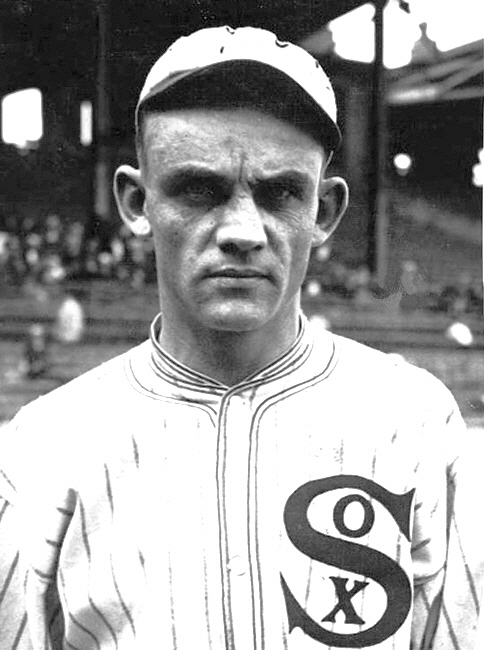
Chick Gandil

- Eight players from the Chicago White Sox were banned in 1921 for conspiring with gamblers to throw the 1919 World Series in the Black Sox scandal. They were all posthumously reinstated by Commissioner Rob Manfred in 2025.
  - Eddie Cicotte^{†} lost his first two starts in the Series, although he did win Game 7 to extend the then best-of-nine contest. One story says that Cicotte had been promised a $10,000 bonus–equal to $186,000 in 2025–if he won 30 games; he was denied five starts towards the end of the season by team owner Charles Comiskey, who had manager Kid Gleason bench him to "save his arm for the World Series". However, the story remains unsubstantiated. Cicotte went 29–7 for the season. Cicotte died in 1969.
  - Lefty Williams^{†} lost all three of his starts in the World Series, enough (combined with Cicotte's two losses) to ensure the White Sox' defeat and setting a record that is highly unlikely to ever be matched. The only other pitcher to have lost three games in a single World Series, George Frazier in 1981, lost all three of his appearances in relief. Williams died in 1959.
  - Chick Gandil^{†} was the mastermind and ringleader of the scandal. In a 1956 article in Sports Illustrated, he admitted his role in the fix and expressed remorse for having done so, saying that he and his co-conspirators deserved to be thrown out of baseball just for talking to the gamblers. Gandil died in 1970.
  - Fred McMullin^{†} was only a backup infielder. However, he overheard teammates discussing the fix and threatened to report them unless he was included. McMullin died in 1952.
  - Swede Risberg^{†} was one of the ringleaders of the scandal. He died in 1975, being the last living Black Sox player.
  - Happy Felsch^{†} hit and fielded poorly in the series. Felsch died in 1964.
  - "Shoeless" Joe Jackson^{†}. (The precise extent of Jackson's involvement is controversial.) Jackson died in 1951.
  - Buck Weaver^{†}, like Jackson, was controversially banned. Weaver refused to accept any money and played to the best of his ability in the Series, but was banned nevertheless because he knew of the conspiracy but did not report it to MLB authorities and team ownership. Weaver successfully sued White Sox owner Charles Comiskey for his 1921 salary. Weaver died in 1956.
- Joe Gedeon^{†} of the St. Louis Browns was banned in 1921 for allegedly conspiring with the gamblers behind the Black Sox scandal. Gedeon died in 1941. He was posthumously reinstated by Commissioner Rob Manfred in 2025.
- Eugene Paulette^{†} of the Philadelphia Phillies was banned in 1921 for associating with known gamblers. Paulette died in 1966. He was posthumously reinstated by Commissioner Rob Manfred in 2025.
- Benny Kauff^{†} of the New York Giants was banned in 1921 for selling stolen cars. Commissioner Landis considered him "no longer a fit companion for other ball players", despite Kauff being acquitted of the charges against him in court. Kauff died in 1961. He was posthumously reinstated by Commissioner Rob Manfred in 2025.
- Lee Magee^{†} of the Chicago Cubs was released just before the season began. Magee sued the Cubs for his 1920 salary and lost; after court testimony proved he had been involved in throwing games and collecting on bets, Landis banned him for life in 1921. He was posthumously reinstated by Commissioner Rob Manfred in 2025.
- Heinie Groh of the Cincinnati Reds was banned for two days in 1921 while he held out for a higher salary, and Landis gave Groh an ultimatum: play for the Reds in 1921, or face lifetime banishment. Groh chose the former option and played out the 1921 season; he retired in 1927 and died in 1968.
- Ray Fisher of the Cincinnati Reds was banned in 1921 after he left his contract with the Reds to accept a coaching position at the University of Michigan before the start of the MLB season. Fisher believed his status would be voluntarily retired, but he later learned he had been declared ineligible. When Fisher appealed to Commissioner Landis, Landis banned him for violation of his contract. Fisher was reinstated by Commissioner Bowie Kuhn in 1980, the only banned player/executive under Landis' tenure to be reinstated after Landis' death in 1944; he died in 1982.
- Dickie Kerr of the Chicago White Sox was banned from organized baseball in 1922 for violating the reserve clause in his contract. During the aforementioned 1919 Series Kerr, as one of the "Clean Sox" with no knowledge of the fix, had won both of his starts. Kerr was reinstated in 1925, retired that same year and died in 1963.
- Phil Douglas^{†} of the New York Giants was banned in 1922 after notifying an acquaintance on the St. Louis Cardinals that he planned to jump the Giants for the pennant stretch run to spite McGraw, with whom Douglas had had a severe falling out during the regular season. He was posthumously reinstated by Commissioner Rob Manfred in 2025.
- Jimmy O'Connell^{†} of the New York Giants and Giants coach Cozy Dolan^{†} were banned in 1924 for offering Philadelphia Phillies shortstop Heinie Sand $500 (equal to $9,400 in 2025) to throw a game between the two teams for the financial gain of O'Connell himself and his gambler backers. O'Connell and Dolan were posthumously reinstated by Commissioner Rob Manfred in 2025.
- William D. Cox^{†}, Philadelphia Phillies owner, was banned in 1943 for betting on his team's games. Cox died in 1989, being the last living person banned by Landis. Cox and one of the predecessor Phillies owners, Horace Fogel, are the only owners to be banned for life. He was posthumously reinstated by Commissioner Rob Manfred in 2025.

=== Banned under Commissioner Kuhn ===
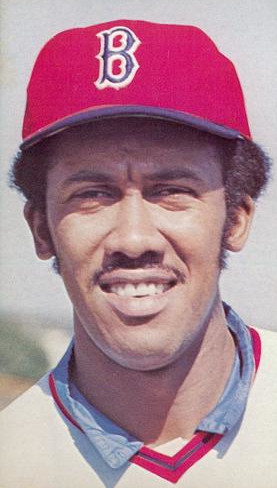
Fergie Jenkins

After Landis died in 1944, there was a long lull before the next banishment. During the tenures of Commissioners Happy Chandler (1945–1951), Ford Frick (1951–1965), Spike Eckert (1965–1968), Bowie Kuhn (1969–1984) and Peter Ueberroth (1984–1989), only three players (or former players) were banned for life.

All three were banned by Kuhn, and all three were later reinstated. By the time of Kuhn's tenure, players had organized the Major League Baseball Players Association and negotiated the first Basic Agreement with the owners. Among other things the Agreement provided, for the first time, an independent process through which active players could appeal disciplinary decisions (up to and including lifetime bans) by League presidents or the Commissioner. As of 2026, no such process exists for personnel who are not members of the MLBPA.

- Ferguson Jenkins of the Texas Rangers was banned in 1980 after a customs search in Toronto, Ontario, found 3 grams (0.11 oz) of cocaine, 2.2 grams (0.078 oz) of hashish, and 1.75 grams (0.062 oz) of marijuana on his person. Jenkins missed the rest of the 1980 season, but was reinstated by an independent arbiter, and retired following the 1983 season. He was elected to the Hall of Fame in 1991.
- Willie Mays and Mickey Mantle, both retired and both in no way involved in baseball anymore, were banned in 1980 and 1983 respectively after they were hired by casinos in Atlantic City, New Jersey, as greeters and autograph signers. The bans were very controversial, especially since the casinos involved did not offer sports betting, which at the time was illegal in New Jersey. Nevertheless, Kuhn opined that a casino was "no place for a baseball hero and Hall of Famer." The bans took place prior to the Hall formalizing its policy against inducting banned persons, and the Hall took no action as a result of Kuhn's decision. Mantle and Mays were reinstated by Peter Ueberroth in 1985, who said that they were "more a part of baseball than perhaps anyone else." Mantle died in 1995 and Mays died in 2024.

=== Banned under Commissioner Giamatti ===
A. Bartlett Giamatti served only five months as Commissioner of Baseball before he died of a heart attack on September 1, 1989.

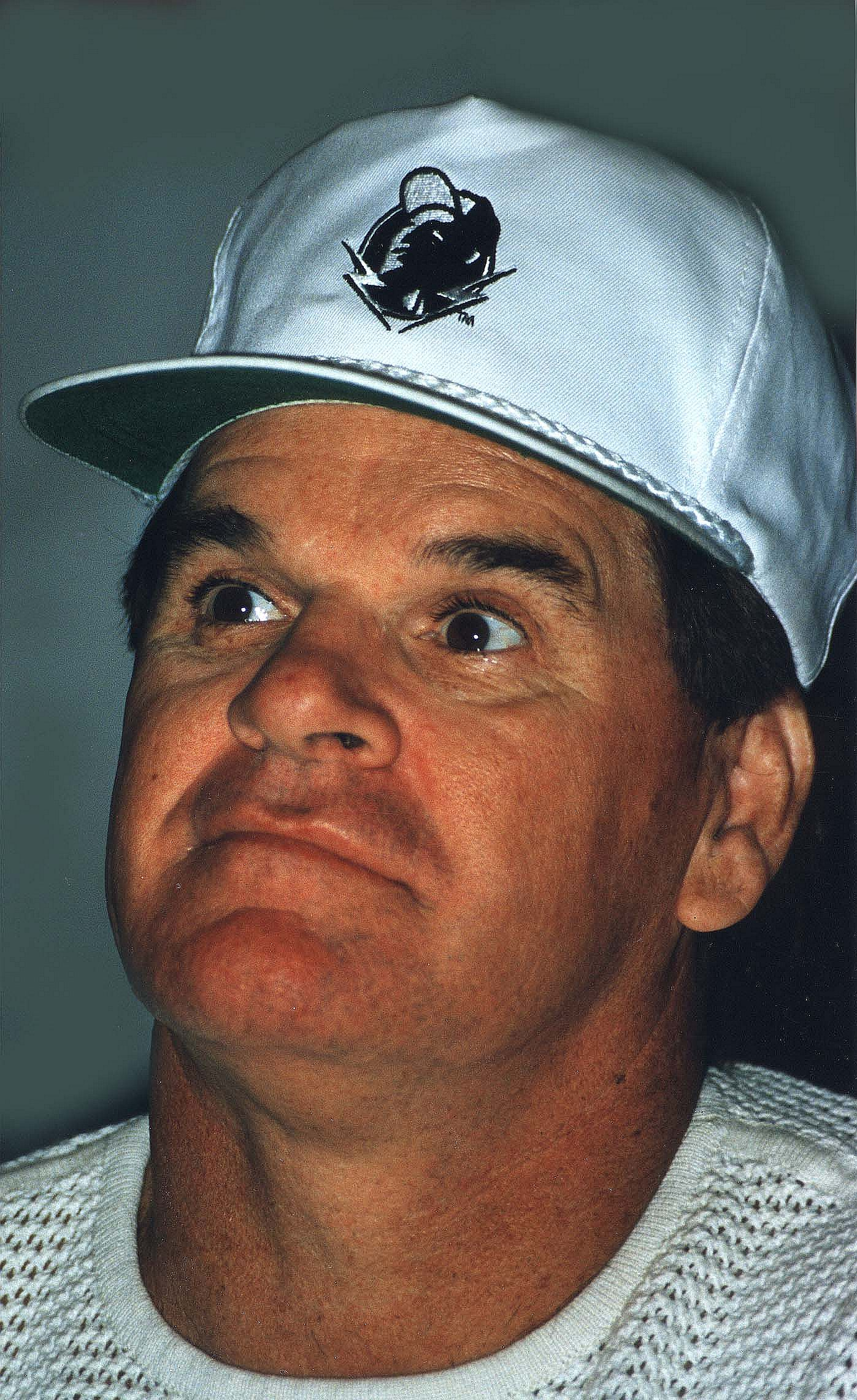
Pete Rose

- Pete Rose^{†}, manager of the Cincinnati Reds and MLB's all-time leader in base hits, was investigated by lawyer John M. Dowd in 1989 for his alleged ties to gamblers and illegal bookmakers; when new information on Rose's gambling habits (including, among other things, betting on but not against the Reds) came to light, Giamatti and Rose reached a legal settlement that resulted in Rose's placement on the ineligible list on August 24, 1989.
  - Whereas all other banned MLB personnel were involuntarily rendered ineligible pursuant to a unilateral decision by the Commissioner, Rose is the only person to be placed on the MLB ineligible list as a result of a mutual agreement. As part of their agreement, Rose accepted that there was a factual reason for his banishment. In return, Giamatti agreed that MLB would not make a formal finding of guilt or innocence with respect to the allegations against Rose. In addition, Rose is permitted to apply for reinstatement once a year indefinitely. Notwithstanding their agreement, the Commissioner stated in his press conference that "I have concluded that (Rose) bet on baseball" and described his sanction as "banishment for life" and "lifetime ineligibility," although he also made clear he was open to the possibility of reinstatement provided Rose could provide evidence of a "redirected, reconfigured, rehabilitated life." Giamatti died eight days later–his sudden demise immediately following Rose's banishment has been seen by some, including Rose himself, as an impediment to reinstatement. After years of denial, Rose admitted to betting on baseball (and on the Reds) in early 2004. He later acknowledged that "everything" the Dowd Report contained was the complete, unadulterated truth. After admitting to his gambling infractions, Rose maintained that he never bet against the Reds, never avoided betting on a particular starting pitcher and never bet on baseball until after he retired as a player–assertions that Dowd has disputed. No credible evidence has emerged to suggest Rose bet against his own team or systematically avoided betting on any pitchers in his starting rotations; however, some evidence has come to light suggesting Rose started betting on baseball while still a player-manager in Cincinnati. Rose applied for reinstatement four times, all of which were either ignored or denied, in large part due to Rose's acknowledgement that he continued to (legally) bet on baseball. Current commissioner Rob Manfred rejected his final request, specifically citing his continued betting, saying that it was evidence that allowing his return would be "an unacceptable risk" to baseball. Rose died on September 30, 2024, and was posthumously reinstated by Commissioner Manfred less than a year later on May 13, 2025.

=== Banned under Commissioner Vincent ===
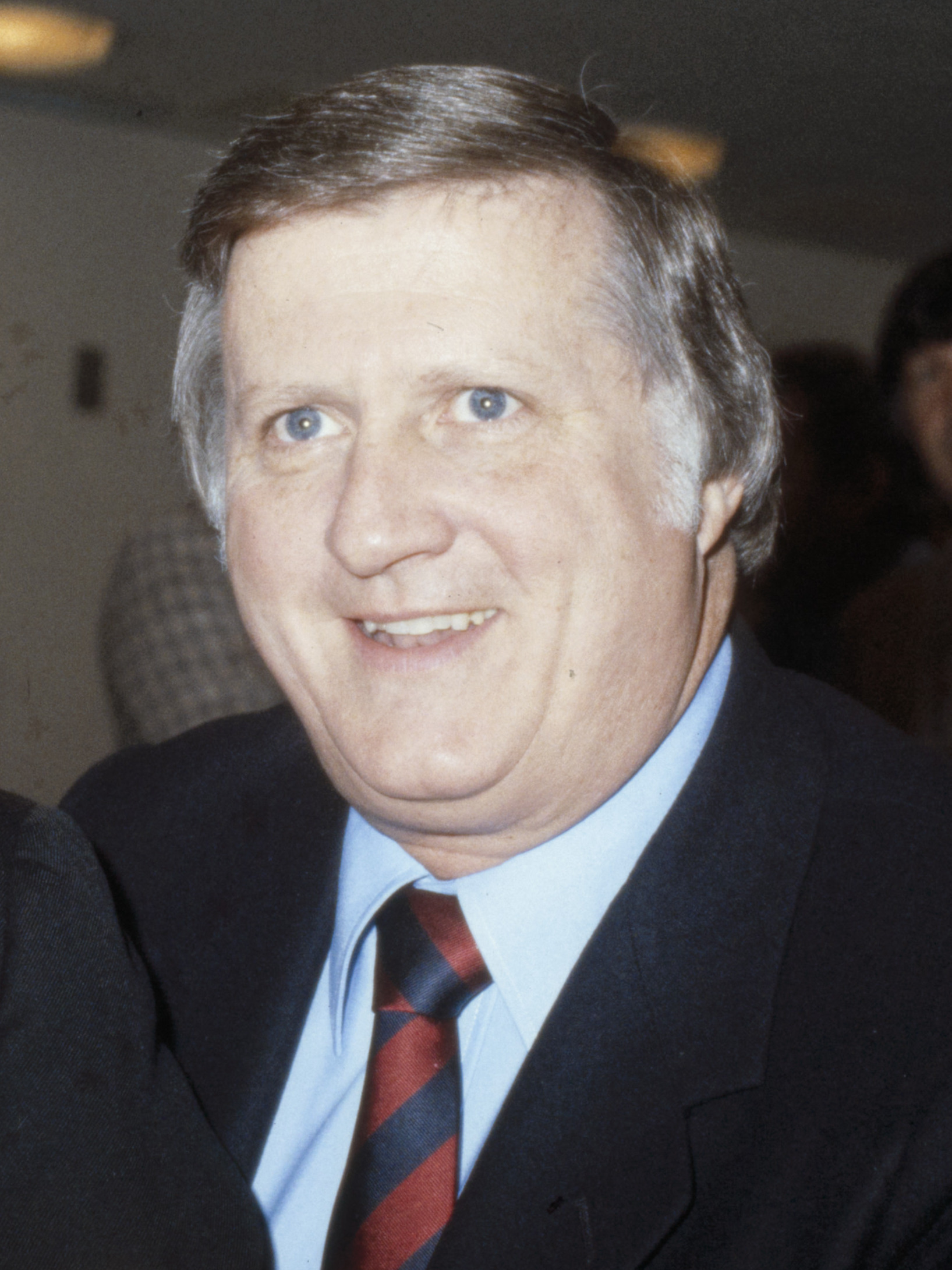
George Steinbrenner

Fay Vincent became commissioner upon the death of Giamatti.

- George Steinbrenner, New York Yankees owner, was banned in 1990 for hiring a private investigator to "dig up dirt" on Yankees player Dave Winfield in order to discredit him; much of the information Steinbrenner received was from small-time gambler and rackets-runner Howard Spira, who had once worked for Winfield's charitable foundation. In Steinbrenner's absence, Robert Nederlander, a limited partner, took control of the Yankees, and Joe Molloy, Steinbrenner's son-in-law, took control after Nederlander resigned. Molloy relinquished the team back to Steinbrenner when Bud Selig reinstated him in 1993; Steinbrenner retired as owner in 2006, passing control to his sons permanently, and died in 2010.
- Steve Howe of the New York Yankees was banned in 1992 after receiving seven suspensions related to drug use, particularly cocaine and alcohol. An independent arbiter reinstated Howe shortly after; Howe retired in 1996 and died in 2006.

=== Banned under Commissioner Selig ===
Bud Selig became Commissioner after Fay Vincent's resignation; he was Acting Commissioner between 1992 and 1998, and was elected to the Office of Commissioner in 1998. In 1999, Selig oversaw the disbandment of the American and National League offices and took over all but a few ceremonial duties formerly performed by the League Presidents, including the discipline of personnel for on-field behavior.

- Cincinnati Reds owner Marge Schott was banned in 1996 for bringing Major League Baseball into disrepute by repeatedly making slurs against African-Americans, Jews, Asians and homosexuals, as well as promoting positive remarks on Adolf Hitler for what he did with Nazi Germany. Schott had previously been fined $25,000, equivalent to $56,000 in 2025, and banned from day-to-day operations of the Reds for the 1993 season for similar offending. She was the first, and to date only, woman to be banned; she was reinstated in 1998, sold a majority stake in her franchise in 1999 and died in 2004.

=== Banned under Commissioner Manfred ===
Rob Manfred succeeded Bud Selig as the Commissioner of Baseball after Selig's retirement on January 25, 2015. To date, he has banned more people than his previous four predecessors combined and is second only to Landis for most people placed on the permanent ineligibility list. The majority of these offenders were for player contract limits, espionage, domestic violence, or sexual harassment cases.

Manfred would also be responsible for the ruling on the MLB's punishment on those banned permanently from the league ultimately ending upon the death of the subject, since they could no longer represent a threat to the game upon their deaths.

- Jenrry Mejía, New York Mets pitcher, was banned on February 12, 2016, for testing positive for performance-enhancing drugs three times in less than a year. He sought and was granted reinstatement in July 2018, and was allowed to join the Dominican Summer League Mets in August. Subject to conditions set by Manfred, all restrictions were lifted at the beginning of spring training in 2019, by which point Mejía had been released by the Mets and signed to a minor league contract with the Boston Red Sox. Despite this, Mejía has not returned to MLB.
- Chris Correa, former St. Louis Cardinals scouting director, was permanently banned on January 30, 2017, for industrial espionage. He was responsible for hacking the Houston Astros' scouting database to provide the Cardinals with a competitive edge in scouting. The Cardinals were also ordered to pay the Astros $2 million in restitution, and forfeited their top two picks in the 2017 draft to the Astros. Correa was later sentenced to 46 months in prison for unauthorized access of a protected computer, thus becoming the first person to be incarcerated for activities that resulted in a ban from the game.

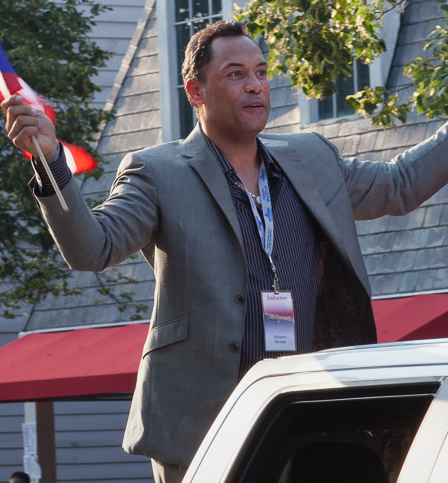
Roberto Alomar

- John Coppolella, former Atlanta Braves general manager, was banned on November 21, 2017, for his role in the Braves' circumvention of MLB rules regarding the signing of international free agents. The Braves were also required to release 12 prospects signed as international free agents, most notably Kevin Maitán, and MLB voided the contract of Ji-hwan Bae. Coppolella was reinstated in January 2023.
- Brandon Taubman, former Houston Astros assistant general manager, was added to the list on November 15, 2019, for his inappropriate comments toward female reporters in the Astros clubhouse in October 2019, pending further investigation into sign stealing by the Astros during the 2017 and 2018 seasons. On January 13, 2020, following an investigation into sign stealing by the Astros, Manfred announced that Taubman would remain on the ineligible list through at least the end of the 2020 season. Although Taubman was interviewed for the sign stealing investigation, Manfred said that his clubhouse comments were egregious enough to merit significant discipline. Taubman was eligible to apply for reinstatement after the 2020 World Series, though there is no record of him doing so as of the start of the 2025 season. If he is reinstated, he will be permanently banned if he commits another "material violation" of baseball rules.
- Roberto Alomar, who was inducted into the Baseball Hall of Fame in 2011 as a player, was banned on April 30, 2021, following an independent investigation into claims he had harassed a female Toronto Blue Jays staffer in 2014. The Blue Jays subsequently announced they would remove a banner honoring Alomar from Rogers Centre (thus un-retiring his number) and sever all ties with him. However, he will remain enshrined in the Hall of Fame. As of 2024, Alomar is the only currently-ineligible player to be enshrined into the Baseball Hall of Fame, in an ex post facto situation.

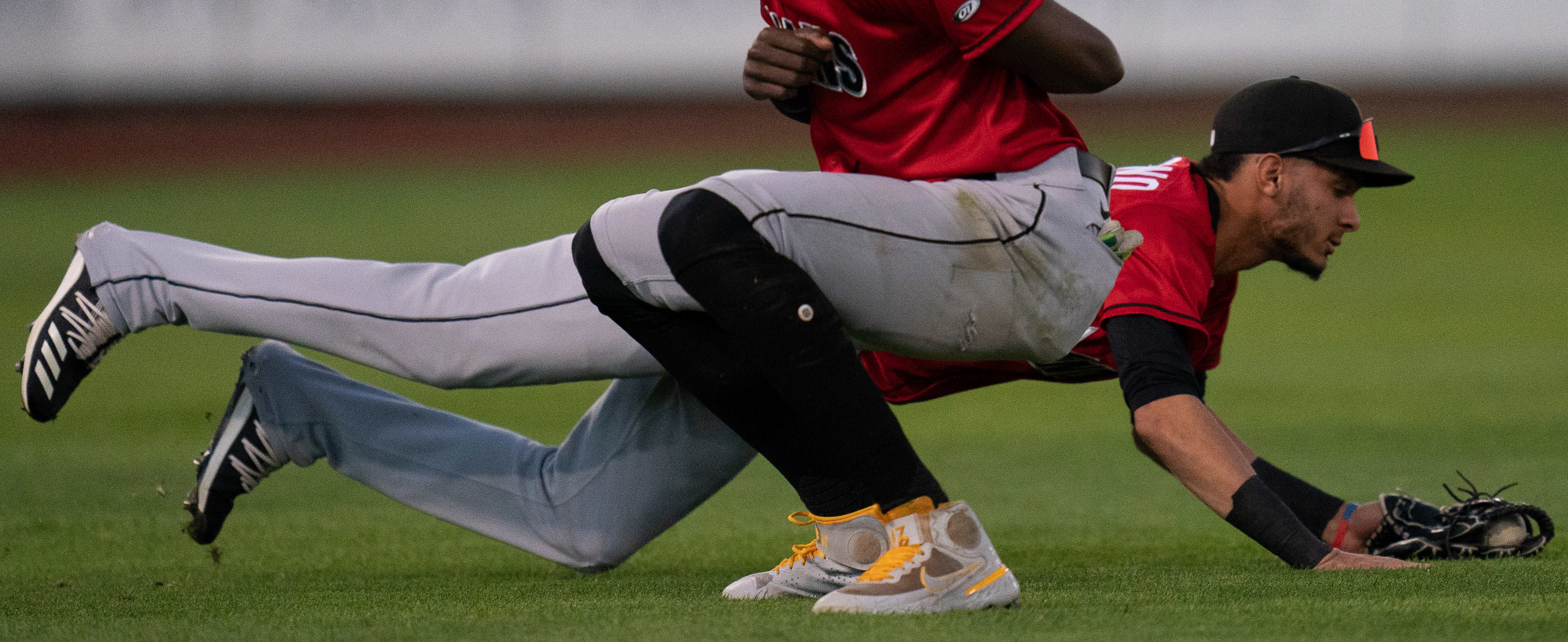
Tucupita Marcano

- Mickey Callaway, former pitching coach of the Los Angeles Angels, was banned on May 26, 2021, following an investigation of allegations of sexual harassment spanning much of his career as manager of the New York Mets, pitching coach of the Cleveland Indians, and Angels pitching coach. The investigation started when The Athletic released an article that detailed the allegations. Callaway was eligible to apply for reinstatement after the 2022 season, though there is no record of him doing so as of the start of the 2025 season.
- Tucupita Marcano, San Diego Padres shortstop, was permanently banned on June 4, 2024, following an investigation of allegations that he had bet on games, including those involving his former team, the Pittsburgh Pirates.

== See also ==
- List of Major League Baseball players suspended for performance-enhancing drugs
- List of suspensions in the NFL
- List of people banned or suspended by the NBA
- List of cricketers banned for corruption
