= Billy McLean (umpire) =

English baseball umpire

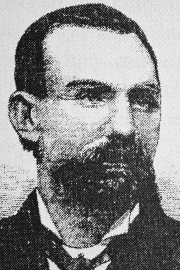
- McLean in 1880
- Born: William H. McLean; December 3, 1835; Preston, Lancashire, England
- Died: February 3, 1927 (aged 91); Philadelphia, Pennsylvania, U.S.
- Occupation: Professional baseball Umpire
- Years active: 1872–1876, 1878–1880, 1882–1885, 1889–1890

William H. McLean (December 3, 1835 – February 3, 1927) was an English professional baseball umpire born in Preston, Lancashire. He umpired games in both the National Association from 1872 until 1875, then the National League when the Association folded. In total, he was an umpire for 435 games during his 14-season career that lasted from 1872 until 1890.

McLean was the umpire in the first official National League game, played at the Jefferson Street Grounds in Philadelphia on April 22, 1876.

August 20, 1874, McLean alleged that some of the Philadelphia Whites had fixed a game with the Chicago White Stockings. John Radcliffe of Philadelphia had offered him $175 in exchange for favoring Chicago, and had implicated teammates Bill Craver, Candy Cummings, Nat Hicks, and Denny Mack, the manager. The Philadelphia ballclub moved against Radcliffe alone and expelled him but the decision was overturned before the next season, on Radcliffe's appeal to the Association.

McLean called three no-hitters during his career: Hugh Daily's on September 13, 1883, Larry Corcoran's on June 27, 1884, and Pud Galvin's on August 4, 1884. McLean died at age 91 in Philadelphia, and is interred at Holy Cross Cemetery in Yeadon, Pennsylvania.
