= 1877 Louisville Grays scandal =

Baseball match-fixing scandal

The 1877 Louisville Grays scandal was an incident in which members of the Louisville Grays baseball team accepted money to lose games. Four players – Bill Craver, Jim Devlin, George Hall and Al Nichols – were subsequently banned from professional baseball for life.

== Background ==
In the early days of professional baseball, crooked play was not uncommon, and many players were suspected of throwing games in exchange for money. Illegal influence by gamblers had undermined the National Association of Professional Base Ball Players (NA) in the early 1870s, and William Hulbert formed the National League (NL) in 1876 with the intention of driving it out of the game. Nevertheless, there were still several gambling-related scandals during the 1876 season.

=== Players involved ===
Jim Devlin started his baseball career in 1873 and was the Louisville Grays' pitcher in 1876 and 1877. In 1876 he had a win–loss record of 30–35 and an earned run average of 1.56, while leading the league in complete games, innings pitched and strikeouts. In 1877, Devlin went 35–25 with a 2.25 ERA and again led the league in complete games and innings pitched. He started and completed each of the Grays' 61 games, an accomplishment no other pitcher in history has matched.

Outfielder George Hall was one of the best sluggers in the game's early history. After playing in the NA from 1871 to 1875, he joined the Philadelphia Athletics in 1876. That season, he led the league with five home runs and finished second in batting average, on-base percentage, slugging percentage and total bases. In 1877, he played for the Grays and had a .323 batting average.

Shortstop Bill Craver was a noted crooked player who had been expelled from a previous team for throwing games in 1870. He played for the New York Mutuals in 1876 before joining the Grays the following season.

Al Nichols also played for the Mutuals in 1876. He joined the Grays in the middle of the 1877 season on the recommendation of Hall and appeared in six games for the team.

Newspapers named the players "Terror" Devlin, "Gentleman George" Hall, "Butcher" Craver and "Slippery Elm" Nichols".

== Scandal ==
After the games of August 13, 1877, the Grays were in first place by four games over St. Louis and 4.5 over the Boston Red Caps, with a record of 27 wins and 13 losses, and with some 20 games left to play. They then commenced a nine-game winless streak (including one tie) and eventually lost the championship to Boston. They won six out of their last seven, making their season record of 35-25 look reasonably respectable, but those wins came after Boston had clinched the pennant, having won 20 of their final 21 games. Louisville finished second, seven games behind Boston. While the historians covering the scandal generally believed the Grays sold the pennant to gamblers, more recent analysis has concluded that was not the case.

Club president Charles E. Chase received telegrams informing him of suspicious gambling activity involving the team. He started an investigation, and Devlin and Hall confessed to throwing several exhibition games late in the season, with Devlin receiving up to $100 per game. On October 4, the entire team was gathered, and Chase demanded that they turn over their telegrams. Every player except Craver complied, and the telegrams showed that Devlin, Hall and Nichols had thrown games. On October 30, Craver, Devlin, Hall and Nichols were expelled from the club, and on December 4, the NL banned them from professional baseball for the rest of their lives.

== Aftermath ==
The Grays franchise folded after the 1877 season. Over the next few decades, there were fewer suspicions of game-fixing in professional baseball. The four banned players were never reinstated. Nichols played semi-professional baseball, Craver and Devlin became police officers, and Hall worked as an engraver and clerk. Devlin tried to be reinstated many times but was unsuccessful. In one instance, he got on his knees and begged Hulbert for another chance. Hulbert responded by handing him $50 (roughly equivalent to $1,200 in 2017 value) and saying, "Devlin, that's what I think of you personally; but, damn you, you have sold a game; you are dishonest and this National League will not stand for it." Devlin died of tuberculosis in 1883. His 1.90 career ERA is the third-lowest of all-time among pitchers with at least 1,000 innings pitched.

== See also ==
- Black Sox Scandal
