= Thomas Devyr =

American baseball player (1844–1896)

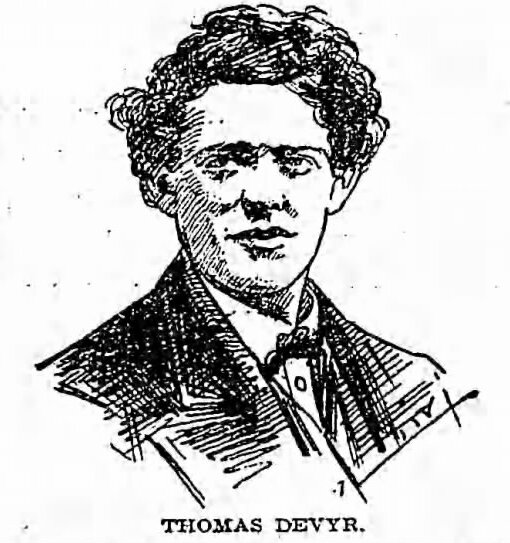
- Shortstop
- Born: c. 1844; Brooklyn, New York, U.S.
- Died: January 22, 1896; Brooklyn, New York, U.S.
- Batted: Unknown Threw: Unknown

Teams
- Brooklyn Eckfords (1862–1863); New York Mutuals (1864–1865), (1867–1869); Brooklyn Eckfords (1869–1870)

Thomas Devyr (c. 1844 – January 22, 1896) was an American baseball player who played shortstop for the Brooklyn Eckfords during their team's championship seasons of 1862 and 1863. Later, in 1867, he confessed, along with two other New York Mutuals team members, to accepting money in a scheme to lose a game against his former club, the Eckfords, in 1865. The incident is considered baseball's first gambling scandal, and all three players were banished from playing competitively. The Mutuals reinstated Devyr in 1867 after his banishment, and went on to play several more seasons, his last in 1870 with the Eckfords.

== Early life ==
Thomas Devyr was born in about 1844 in Brooklyn, New York. His father was Thomas Ainge Devyr, an Irish political journalist and activist involved in the Chartism movement in Ireland. In 1840, he and his family fled the country to the United States when threatened with imprisonment. The family settled into Williamsburg neighborhood of Brooklyn, New York, where the elder Thomas became an influential progressive writer and newspaper editor. He founded the first daily newspaper in the area's history, the Williamsburgh Daily Post. The Devyr family included five sons, and two daughters, and younger Thomas' middle initial has been noted as either an A or an H, depending on the source.

== Baseball career ==
Devyr began playing baseball for a team of younger players called the Marion Club of Brooklyn; a team that was used by the Brooklyn Eckfords' to supply their team with local talent. During his playing days, his listed height was 5'8.5" and weight as 140 lbs. Despite his small stature, he was noted for being as "active and agile as a cat", while also able generate a surprising amount of power.

He joined the Eckfords in 1862 as their starting shortstop. The club won the National Association of Base Ball Players (NABBP) championship in both 1862 and 1863. In 1864, Devyr switched teams, joining the New York Mutuals.

=== Banishment ===
During the 1865 season, the Mutuals were playing the Eckfords in a best-of-3-game series, with the first game's victory going to the Mutuals. Before the second game, Devyr was approached by his teammate, William Wansley, who claimed that gamblers were going pay them to lose the game intentionally, and he was offered $300 to assist. The Mutuals lost the game, and Devyr received just $30 of what he was promised, and their obvious errors raised the suspicions of the Mutuals. When confronted by his club, he confessed, though claiming he only went along with the scheme due to his lack of money. Wansley, Devyr, and a third player Ed Duffy were dismissed from the club, and subsequently banned from playing baseball by a vote of the league members. The incident is noted as being organized baseball's first scandal.

=== Reinstatement and later career ===
The Mutuals were unable to find a suitable replacement at shortstop, so they began to use Devyr during the 1867 season, without consulting the National Association. Two rival clubs filed official protests with the league. While one was dismissed, the other found the Mutuals guilty of using a banned player and struck the game in question from the official record. Following the season, during the National Association convention, Devyr was reinstated by a vote of the members. His youth was cited as the primary factor for leniency.

== Post-baseball life ==
Following his baseball career, he became involved in local politics. As a member of the Democratic Party, he was elected as Supervisor of the seventeenth ward in 1870. After that position, he continued his work in various other city departments.

Devyr died at his Greenpoint neighborhood home in Brooklyn on January 22, 1896, at the age of 51, and was interred in his family's plot at Mount Olivet Cemetery in Queens, New York.
