= George Hall (baseball) =

American baseball player (1849–1923)

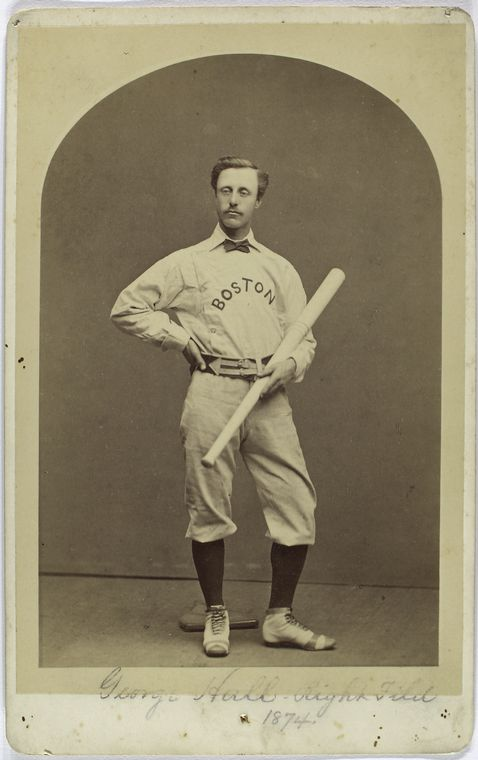
- Outfielder
- Born: March 29, 1849; Stepney, England
- Died: June 11, 1923 (aged 74); Ridgewood, New York, U.S.
- Batted: Left Threw: Left

Major league debut
- May 5, 1871, for the Washington Olympics

Last major league appearance
- October 6, 1877, for the Louisville Grays

Major league statistics
- Batting average: .322
- Home runs: 13
- Runs batted in: 252
- Stats at Baseball Reference

Teams
- National Association of Base Ball Players Enterprise of Brooklyn (1866) Excelsior of Brooklyn (1867) Star of Brooklyn (1868–1869) Brooklyn Atlantics (1870) National Association Washington Olympics (1871) Baltimore Canaries (1872–1873) Boston Red Stockings (1874) Athletic of Philadelphia (1875) National League Athletic of Philadelphia (1876) Louisville Grays (1877)

Career highlights and awards
- NL home run leader (1876)

George William Hall (March 29, 1849 – June 11, 1923) was an American amateur and professional baseball player who played in the National Association and later the National League. Born in Stepney, England, Hall later immigrated to the U.S. He made his professional debut on May 5, 1871. While playing for the Louisville Grays, he was banned from Major League Baseball after an 1877 gambling scandal.

== Early career ==
Prior to the inception of professional leagues, Hall played for the Brooklyn Atlantics. He commenced his professional career with the Washington Olympics of the National Association in 1871, hitting .294 in 32 games. He played for the Baltimore Canaries in 1872 and 1873 seasons, hitting .336 and .345 respectively. Playing mostly center field up to this point, he shifted from center to right field the following year when he played for the 1874 champions, the Boston Red Stockings. After just one season with the Red Stockings, he moved on to play for the Philadelphia Athletics, where he had another good season at the plate, hitting .299, with four home runs, which placed second in the league behind Jim O'Rourke's six.

== National League ==

After the 1875 season, the National Association folded, which left room for a new league to begin. In 1876, the National League came into existence. Hall's team, the Athletics, followed that movement with very little success, finishing seventh out of eight teams. One of the bright spots that year for the Athletics was the hitting prowess of their star hitter, Hall. He led the team in almost all major hitting categories including a .366 batting average, 51 runs scored, and a league leading five home runs. On June 17, 1876, he became the first Major League baseball player to hit two home runs in one game. Those five home runs stood as the single season home run record until Charley Jones hit nine in 1879.

For the 1877 baseball season, Philadelphia had been expelled from the league for refusing to go on a western road trip, late in the 1876 season, for financial reasons, so Hall moved on to play for the Louisville Grays. Again, he had an excellent season, hitting .323, scoring 51 runs, and hitting 8 triples. Surprisingly, after appearing in the league leaders for home runs the last two seasons, he did not hit one in 1877.

=== Possible first cycle ===
Some baseball researchers attribute Hall as being the first major league player to hit for the cycle. In a game against the Cincinnati Red Stockings on June 14, 1876, Hall had five hits. Contemporary newspaper accounts agree that four of the hits were a home run, a single, and two triples; there is disagreement as to if the remaining hit was a double (which would complete the cycle) or another triple. The first undisputed major league cycle is attributed to Curry Foley of the Buffalo Bisons of the National League in 1882.

== Gambling scandal and banishment ==
On October 26, 1877, Louisville club vice president Charles Chase confronted Hall and fellow Gray Jim Devlin with charges that they threw some road games in August and September. Both admitted only to throwing non-league games, one of which was an exhibition game in Lowell, Massachusetts, on August 30, and another in Pittsburgh, Pennsylvania, on September 3. The admissions also implicated teammates Al Nichols and Bill Craver. Newspapers nicknamed Hall "Gentleman George". Hall claimed that he and Devlin helped in losses to the Cincinnati Reds on September 6 and to the minor league Indianapolis Blues on September 24‚ but he argued that since the Reds were about to be suspended and the games nullified‚ it amounted to an exhibition game. As a result of the scandal, all four players were banned for life from Major League Baseball.

Hall died in Ridgewood, New York, at the age of 74. He was buried at Evergreen Cemetery in Brooklyn, New York.

== See also ==
- List of people banned from Major League Baseball
- List of Major League Baseball annual home run leaders
- List of Major League Baseball players to hit for the cycle

Preceded by none	Single season home run record holder 1876–1879	Succeeded by Charley Jones
