= Jim Devlin =

American baseball player (1849–1883)

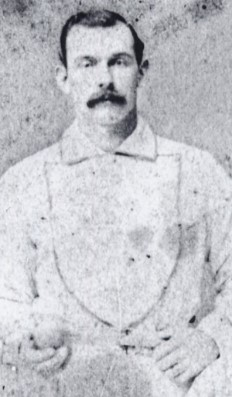
- Devlin in 1876
- Pitcher / First baseman
- Born: June 6, 1849; Philadelphia, Pennsylvania, U.S.
- Died: October 10, 1883 (aged 34); Philadelphia, Pennsylvania, U.S.
- Batted: Right Threw: Right

Major league debut
- April 21, 1873, for the Philadelphia White Stockings

Last major league appearance
- October 6, 1877, for the Louisville Grays

Major league statistics
- Win–loss record: 72–76
- Earned run average: 1.90
- Strikeouts: 286
- WHIP: 1.09
- Stats at Baseball Reference

Teams
- Philadelphia White Stockings (1873); Chicago White Stockings (1874–1875); Louisville Grays (1876–1877)

Career highlights and awards
- NL strikeout leader (1876)

James Alexander Devlin (June 6, 1849 – October 10, 1883) was an American professional baseball player who played mainly as a first baseman early in his career, then later as a pitcher. Devlin played for three teams during his five-year career; the Philadelphia White Stockings and the Chicago White Stockings of the National Association, and the Louisville Grays of the National League. However, after admitting to throwing games and costing the Grays the pennant in the 1877 Louisville Grays scandal, he and three of his teammates were banned from professional baseball.

== Career ==
Jim Devlin began his career in the first organized professional league, the National Association, as an infielder for his hometown Philadelphia White Stockings in 1873, and the Chicago White Stockings in the 1874 and 1875 seasons. In 1876, the NA folded and was replaced by the National League that lives on to this day. In this year, Devlin began pitching for the Louisville Grays, starting 68 games with an impeccable 1.56 earned run average and leading the Grays in batting with .315. Devlin's best pitch was a "drop pitch", now known as a sinker, which he may have been the first to throw. In 1877, Devlin threw every pitch of his team's 61 games, the only pitcher ever to do so.

=== 1877 scandal ===
Led by Devlin and slugger George Hall, the Grays opened up a four-game lead in the National League pennant race by mid-August. However, the Grays suffered a horrendous road trip and endured a seven-game losing streak, which was characterized by uncharacteristic "bonehead" plays and poor pitching. The Grays relinquished their lead and eventually finished second, seven games behind the Boston Red Caps (who subsequently won 20 of 21 games to end the season). Meanwhile, certain Grays were seen around town wearing fancy new jewelry and ostentatiously dining at exclusive restaurants.

At the end of the season, suspicion arose that Grays players were being paid to intentionally lose games. This suspicion increased as the players performed very well in postseason exhibition matches. Furthermore, the Louisville Courier-Journal discovered that utility infielder Al Nichols had received an abnormally high number of telegrams. Courier-Journal writer John Haldeman, who was the son of the Grays' president and who sometimes played second base in the team's exhibition games, was the first to publicly accuse the Grays of throwing games. Team vice president Charles Chase, who had earlier received but disregarded telegrams informing him that gamblers were betting against the Grays in certain games, began an investigation. Devlin and Hall confessed, and Chase demanded that his players allow him to inspect their telegrams. The telegrams confirmed that Nichols was coordinating the games with New York City gamblers. Bill Craver, the team's shortstop, who was the only player to deny the request and who carried a bad reputation from his days in the National Association, was presumed guilty by association and was suspended. Craver, against whom no proof of gambling was ever found, was outraged and appealed the suspension.

National League president William Hulbert decided to make a stand against gambling. At the 1877 Winter Meetings, the National League banned Devlin, Hall, Nichols and Craver for life. Devlin also appealed to the league for reinstatement every year for the rest of his life. However, Hulbert remained resolute and none of the Louisville Four ever played professional baseball again (according to legend, Devlin literally begged, on his knees, for another chance; Hulbert responded by giving Devlin a fifty-dollar bill (equivalent to $1,300 in 2025); "This is what I think of you personally, Jim", the league president supposedly said, "[b]ut, damn you, you have thrown a game, you are dishonest, and this National League will not stand for it!"). Devlin even appealed to Harry Wright, one of the game's most influential figures, for help in reinstating him, but Wright never responded to Devlin's requests. Devlin, who found work in Philadelphia as a police officer, died poor of tuberculosis in 1883 and was survived by a wife and son. He is interred at New Cathedral Cemetery in Philadelphia.

== See also ==
- List of Major League Baseball annual strikeout leaders
- List of Major League Baseball career ERA leaders
- List of people banned from Major League Baseball
