= Louisville Grays =

American 19th-century baseball team

Information
- League: National League
- Location: Louisville, Kentucky
- Ballpark: Louisville Baseball Park
- Founded: 1876
- Folded: 1877
- Colors
- Ownership: Walter Newman Haldeman and Charles Chase
- Management: Jack Chapman

The Louisville Grays were a 19th-century United States baseball team and charter member of the National League, based in Louisville, Kentucky. They played two seasons, 1876 and 1877, and compiled a record of 65–61. Their home games were at the Louisville Baseball Park. The Grays were owned by businessman Walter Newman Haldeman, owner and publisher of the Louisville Courier-Journal newspaper.

== Overview ==
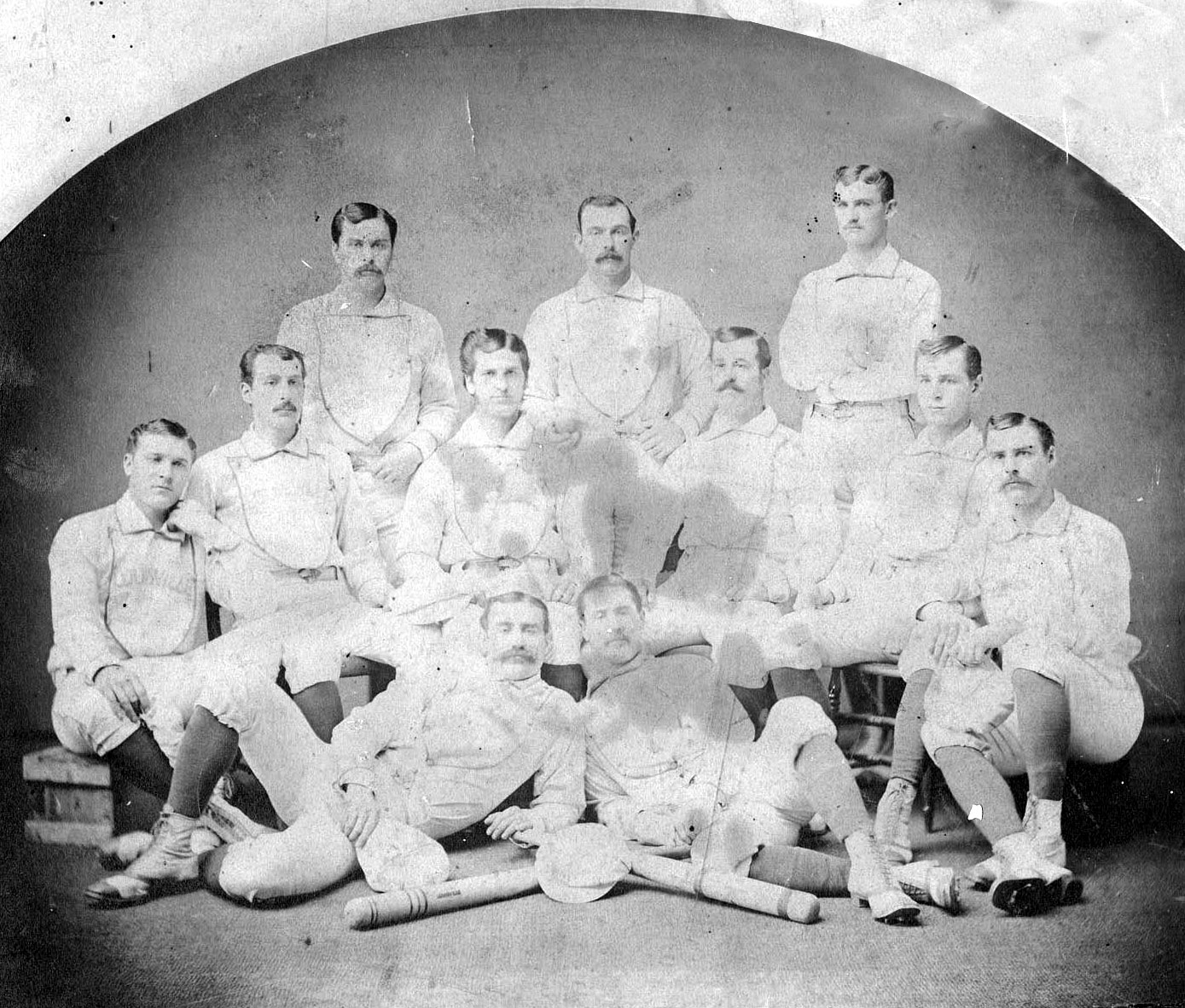
1876 Louisville Grays team

The Grays were undone by Major League Baseball's first gambling scandal. The team was in first place in August 1877, then suddenly lost seven games and tied one against the Boston Red Stockings and Hartford Dark Blues. Boston ended up winning the pennant, seven games ahead of the second-place Grays. A Courier-Journal story questioning the team's conduct was written by John Haldeman, the owner's son.

Team president Charles Chase received two anonymous telegrams. One noted that gamblers were favoring the less talented Hartford team in an upcoming series. The second telegram predicted Louisville would throw the next game versus Hartford on August 21. The Grays committed a number of suspicious errors and lost that game 7–0. League president William Hulbert investigated and ordered players to authorize Western Union to release all telegrams sent or received during the 1877 season. All players complied except shortstop Bill Craver, the team's captain.

The telegrams indicated that pitcher Jim Devlin, left fielder George Hall, and utility player Al Nichols intentionally lost games in exchange for money. No direct evidence was found implicating Craver. All four were banned from baseball for life, Craver for refusing to comply with the investigation.

Devlin pitched every inning for the 1877 Grays, leading the league in games and innings pitched. Hall played every inning in left field; he was a good batter, and was the 1876 home run leader with five. The original St. Louis Brown Stockings had signed Devlin and Hall for 1878 and went out of business with the Grays after the investigation.

== See also ==
- Louisville Grays all-time roster
- 1876 Louisville Grays season
- 1877 Louisville Grays season
- 1877 Louisville Grays scandal
- Sports in Louisville, Kentucky
