= Al Nichols =

English Major League Baseball player (1852–1936)

- Third baseman
- Born: February 14, 1852; Worcester, England
- Died: June 18, 1936 (aged 84); Richmond Hill, New York
- Batted: Unknown Threw: Unknown

MLB debut
- April 24, 1875, for the Brooklyn Atlantics

Last MLB appearance
- September 26, 1877, for the Louisville Grays

MLB statistics
- Batting average: .171
- Home runs: 0
- Runs batted in: 18
- Stats at Baseball Reference

Teams
- Brooklyn Atlantics (1875); New York Mutuals (1876); Louisville Grays (1877)

Alfred Henry Nichols (born as Alfred Henry Williams; February 14, 1852 – June 18, 1936) was an English Major League Baseball player for three seasons. Born in Worcester, England, he played for three different teams, and mainly played as a third baseman. After his third season, in 1877 as a member of the Louisville Grays, he was suspended from baseball for the remainder of his life for his part in throwing games for money. He is also the first person born in England to play Major League Baseball.

== Career ==
Nichols got his start at third base for the 1875 Brooklyn Atlantics of the National Association. He batted only .153 in 32 games played that season. The following year, after the collapse of the Association, he played for the New York Mutuals of the new National League and didn't fare much better, hitting .179 in 57 games.

== Banishment ==
It was for the Louisville Grays in 1877 that he would gain infamy. It was determined that he was involved in throwing games for money along with teammates George Hall, Jim Devlin, and Bill Craver. As a personal friend of Hall, he was brought in to play third base at Hall's insistence to replace Bill Hauge when he had to take time off due to injury. At this point, Louisville was in first place, but soon after Nichols' arrival, the team began to lose games at an alarming rate. Club President Charles E. Chase started to become suspicious when Nichols was still playing even though he continued to make key errors when Hauge was well enough to return to his starting position. His suspicion was confirmed when he received a couple telegrams instructing him to watch his players. Chase confronted the players, and Hall and Devlin confessed. The matter was referred to National League president William Hulbert, and Nichols was formally banned from Major League Baseball on December 4, 1877.

== Personal life ==
Nichols came to the United States from England in 1861.

After his banishment from baseball, he spent most of his life in the Brooklyn, New York area, got married and raised a family. He worked at various jobs, including as a shipping clerk and inspector, and was very remorseful about his role in the scandal, making many unsuccessful attempts to earn reinstatement. He died in Richmond Hill, New York, at the age of 84. He was cremated and interred at Green-Wood Cemetery in Brooklyn.
