= Ed Duffy =

Irish baseball player (1844–1888)

- Shortstop
- Born: c. 1844; Ireland
- Died: October 16, 1888 (aged 43–44); Brooklyn, New York, U.S.
- Batted: Unknown Threw: Right

MLB debut
- May 8, 1871, for the Chicago White Stockings

Last MLB appearance
- October 30, 1871, for the Chicago White Stockings

MLB statistics
- Batting average: .231
- Home runs: 0
- RBI: 15
- Stats at Baseball Reference

Teams
- National Association of Base Ball Players Eagle of New York (1860) Brooklyn Eckfords (1863, 1870) New York Mutuals (1864–1865) Chicago White Stockings (1870) National Association of Professional BBP Chicago White Stockings (1871)

Edward Charles Duffy (c. 1844 – October 16, 1888) was an Irish-born professional baseball player. He played one season in Major League Baseball as an infielder in 1871 for the Chicago White Stockings. He was banned from baseball in 1865 for associating with gamblers, but was reinstated in 1870.
