= Bill Craver =

American baseball player (1844–1901)

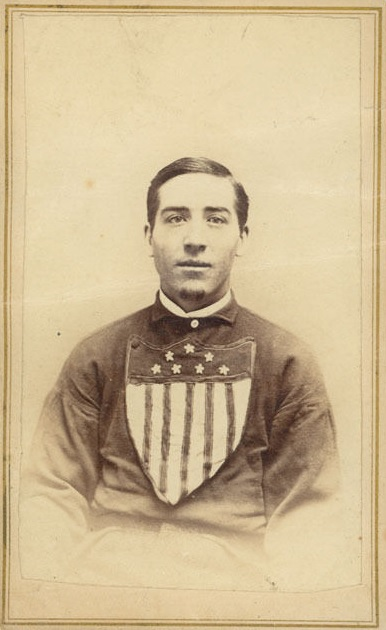
- Craver in 1866
- Middle infielder / Catcher
- Born: June 1844; Troy, New York, U.S.
- Died: June 17, 1901 (aged 56–57); Troy, New York, U.S.
- Batted: Right Threw: Right

Major-league debut
- May 9, 1871, for the Troy Haymakers

Last major-league appearance
- October 6, 1877, for the Louisville Grays

Major-league statistics
- Batting average: .290
- Home runs: 2
- Runs batted in: 228
- Stats at Baseball Reference

Teams
- National Association of Base Ball Players Troy Haymakers (1866–1870) Chicago White Stockings (1870) League player Troy Haymakers (1871) Baltimore Canaries (1872–1873) Philadelphia White Stockings (1874) Philadelphia Centennials (1875) Philadelphia Athletics (1875) New York Mutuals (1876) Louisville Grays (1877) League manager Troy Haymakers (1871) Baltimore Canaries (1872) Philadelphia Centennials (1875) New York Mutuals (1876)

William H. Craver (June 1844 – June 17, 1901) was an American professional baseball player from Troy, New York who played mainly as a middle infielder, but did play many games at catcher as well during his seven-year major-league career. He played for seven different teams, in two leagues. He was later expelled from the major leagues in the infamous Louisville gambling scandal in 1877.

== Early life ==
Before his baseball career, Craver had served in the military during the Civil War with the 13th Heavy Artillery Regiment out of New York. He enlisted on January 21, 1864, as a Private in Company K, and mustered out on June 28 in Norfolk, Virginia.

When the war, and his military career were over, he began his organized baseball career as a catcher in 1866 with the Union Baseball Club of Rensselaer County, which became the Unions of Lansingburgh. The Unions gained the nickname of Haymakers in August of that year after a visit to the Capitoline Grounds and the Elysian Fields. Later, in 1870, while playing for a Chicago team, he was accused of breaking his contract with the team.

== Major league baseball career ==
In 1871, Craver joined the Troy Haymakers, who entered the National Association of Professional Base Ball Players in the league's first season. He played second base, and after just four games, he replaced Lip Pike as manager. He played well, batting .322, but the team finished in seventh place. For the next two seasons, he joined the Baltimore Canaries, the first of which he was player-manager. He was replaced at manager later in the year by Everett Mills, but stayed with the team through the 1873 season. Playing for the Philadelphia White Stockings in 1874, he led the league in games played, and as a second baseman, he led the league in putouts and errors. Craver had his best offensive season that year, batting .343 and leading the league in stolen bases. In 1875, he moved over the Philadelphia Centennials. He played in just 13 games for them when, together with George Bechtel, he was traded to the Philadelphia Athletics to replace injured players Dave Eggler and Wes Fisler in exchange for $1,500. He led the NA in triples in 1875 with 13.

The National Association folded following the 1875 season, and Craver joined the 1876 New York Mutuals, a team that he also managed. It was his only season in New York, as the Mutuals were expelled from the league for not making the required western trip. It was during this season that Craver was reputedly savagely beaten by a gambler for doublecrossing him on a fix. He gained infamy the following season, his final season, when playing for the Louisville Grays.

== Expulsion ==
In 1877, the Grays were ahead in the league standings, with a 27–13 record with only 15 games left to play, but then lost their lead through horrible play, losing eight straight games at one point. The trouble reportedly began when third baseman Bill Hague was injured and needed to be replaced. George Hall suggested that the team pick up his former Mutuals teammate Al Nichols. The errors by Nichols, Hall, and Craver began to accumulate, and owner Charles Chase became suspicious when he noticed that Nichols was still in the lineup, even though Hague was fully healthy. The players were soon seen around town with new clothes and jewelry. Chase confronted pitcher Jim Devlin and did not receive a confession, but Hall thought Devlin had confessed. Hall claimed that Nichols was the person in contact with the gamblers and all three had thrown games. Chase requested from each member of the team permission to see all the Western Union telegrams sent and received. Craver was the only man on the team to refuse, which caused him to be suspended. The telegrams proved the three were in open communication with the gamblers. The National League subsequently expelled all four players "for conduct in contravention of the objects of this League." Craver was banned even though it was not proven that he participated in throwing any games, but there were reports of his gambling and insubordination in his past, along with his refusal to cooperate with this investigation.

== Later life ==
After his forced retirement from baseball, Craver became a police officer in 1886 in Troy, along with fellow "criminal" Devlin. He began to receive military disability on July 1, 1892, which would continue on to his widow, Catherine C. Craver. Craver died at the age of 57 of heart disease in his hometown of Troy, and is interred at Oakwood Cemetery.

== See also ==
- Denny Mack – the Radcliffe affair

Preceded by Lip Pike	Troy Haymakers managers 1871	Succeeded by Jimmy Wood
Preceded by First manager	Baltimore Canaries managers 1872	Succeeded by Everett Mills
