= Cincinnati Reds (1876–1879) all-time roster =

List of baseball players

The following is a list of players and who appeared in at least one game for the Cincinnati Reds franchise, which played in the National League from 1876 to 1879. For players from the current Cincinnati Reds, see Cincinnati Reds all-time roster.

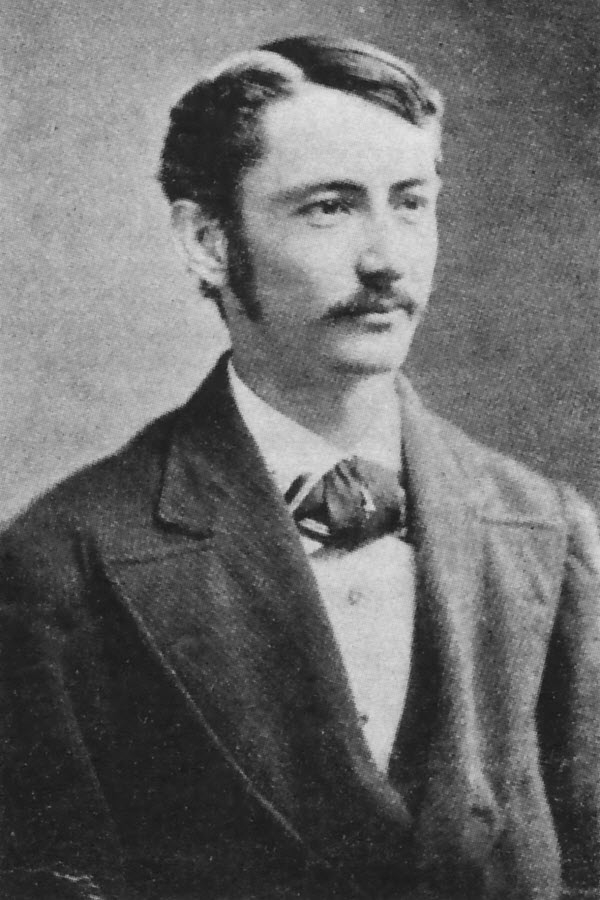
Candy Cummings played his final season with the 1877 Reds.

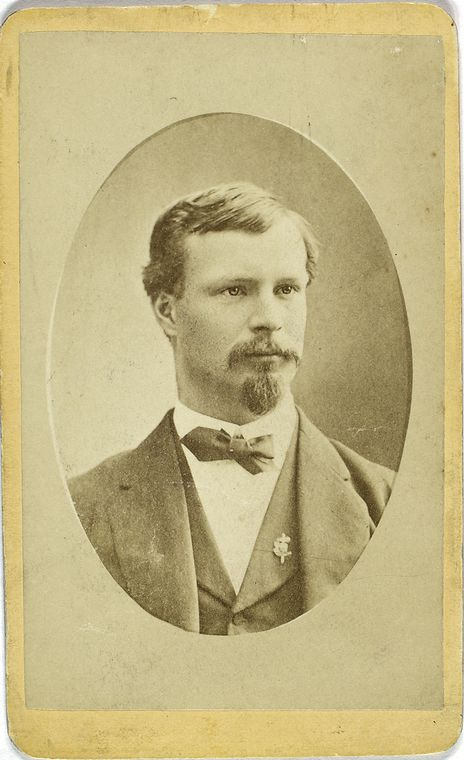
Charlie Gould was the player-manager of the 1876 Reds.

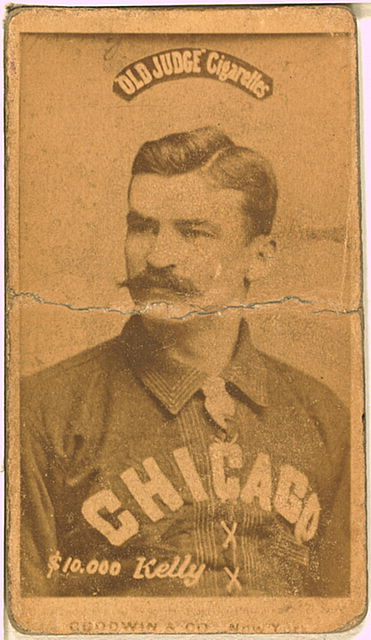
King Kelly began his Hall of Fame career with the 1878 Reds.

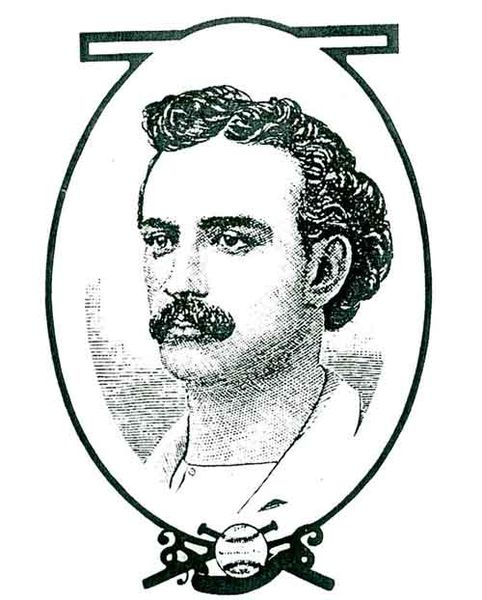
Lip Pike led the NL with four home runs in 1877.

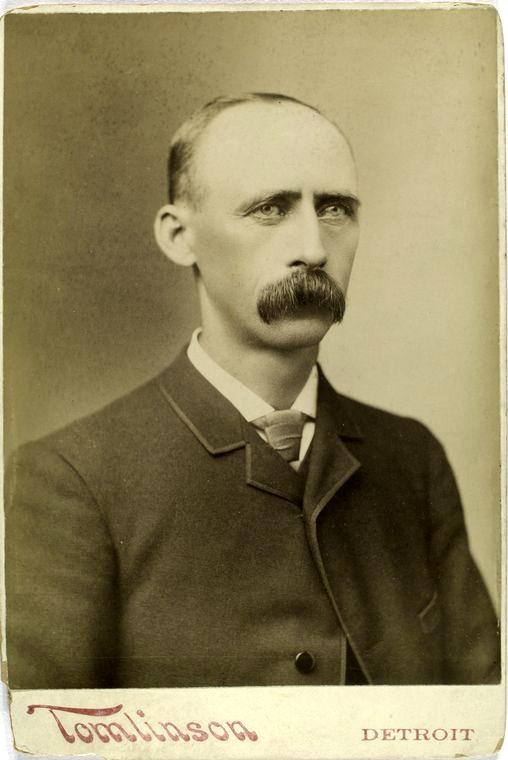
Deacon White was a player-manager for 18 games with the 1879 Reds.

Key to symbols in player table
*	Player was a player-manager
†	Inducted into the National Baseball Hall of Fame and Museum
§	Indicates the player is a Hall of Famer and was a player-manager

Players who have played for the Cincinnati Reds, primary position played, and season(s) played for franchise
Player	Position(s)	Season(s)	Notes	Ref
Bob Addy^{*}	Right fielder	1876–1877	Addy had a .279 batting average during his two seasons with the Reds, and was their player-manager for a period of 24 games in 1877.	
Ross Barnes	Shortstop	1879	The former National League batting champion was the Reds' shortstop in 1879, and batted .266 in 77 games.	
Amos Booth	Utility player	1876–1877	Played at several positions during his 108 games played with the Reds, and had a .227 batting average. In 12 games pitched, he had 1–8 win–loss record.	
Mike Burke	Shortstop	1879	Burke had a .222 batting average in 28 games with the Reds.	
Bobby Clack	Utility player	1876		
Candy Cummings^{†}	Pitcher	1877	In the last season of his Hall of Fame career, Cummings had a 5–14 win–loss record and a 4.34 earned run average.	
Ned Cuthbert	Left fielder	1877		
Dory Dean	Pitcher	1876		
Buttercup Dickerson	Outfielder	1878–1879	In 1879, he played left field, had a .291 batting average, and led the NL with the 14 triples. He is credited as the first Italian American in Major League Baseball, and is a member of the National Italian American Sports Hall of Fame.	
Sam Field	Catcher	1876	Field went hitless in 14 at bats during his season with the Reds.	
Cherokee Fisher	Pitcher	1876	The 1876 season was Fisher's last full season at the major league level, and he had a 4–20 win–loss record and a 3.02 earned run average.	
Will Foley	Third baseman	1876–1877		
Billy Geer	Shortstop	1878		
Joe Gerhardt	Second baseman	1878–1879		
Charlie Gould^{*}	First baseman	1876–1877	Gould was the Reds' player-manager in 1876, and led NL first basemen in assists in 1876.	
Jimmy Hallinan	Second baseman	1877		
Scott Hastings	Catcher	1877		
Nat Hicks	Catcher	1877		
Pete Hotaling	Center fielder	1879		
Charley Jones	Outfielder	1876–1878		
King Kelly^{†}	Utility player	1878–1879	Kelly began his Hall of Fame career by playing two seasons with the Reds. In both seasons, he spent significant time as their right fielder and catcher, while adding 33 games played at third base in 1879.	
Henry Kessler	Utility player	1876–1877		
John Magner	Center fielder	1879	His playing career consisted of four at bats, no hits, and one run batted in.	
Jack Manning^{*}	Utility player	1877	In 1877, he appeared in 57 games, played multiple defensive positions, had a .317 batting average, and was their player-manager for a period of 20 games.	
Bobby Mathews	Pitcher	1877	After winning more than 20 games in his previous five seasons, Mathews had a 3–12 win–loss record and a 4.04 earned run average.	
Cal McVey^{*}	Third baseman / First baseman	1878–1879	In 1878, McVey played third base and had a .306 batting average, and played at first base in 1879 with a .297 batting average. These were the last two seasons he played at the major league level.	
Levi Meyerle	Infielder	1877	The two-time National Association batting champion played one season with the Reds and had a .327 batting average in 27 games played.	
George Miller	Catcher	1877		
Bobby Mitchell	Pitcher	1877–1878		
Jack Neagle	Pitcher	1879		
Dave Pierson	Catcher / Right fielder	1876		
Lip Pike^{*}	Center fielder / Second baseman	1877–1878	Pike led the NL with four home runs and was the Reds' player-manager for a period of 14 games in 1877. He appeared in 31 games in 1878 and had a .324 batting average before appearing with the Providence Grays later in the season.	
Blondie Purcell	Pitcher / Outfielder	1879		
Billy Redmond	Shortstop	1877		
Johnny Ryan	Center fielder	1877		
Harry Smith	Utility player	1877		
Redleg Snyder	Left fielder	1876		
Chub Sullivan	First baseman	1877–1878		
Charlie Sweasy	Second baseman	1876		
Harry Wheeler	Left fielder	1879		
Deacon White^{§}	Catcher / Right fielder	1878–1879	In his two seasons with the Reds, he had batting averages of .314 and .330. In 1879, he was their player-manager for a period of 18 games.	
Will White	Pitcher	1878		
Dale Williams	Pitcher	1876		
