= 1877 Cincinnati Reds season =

1877 Cincinnati Reds
- League: National League
- Ballpark: Avenue Grounds
- City: Cincinnati
- Record: 15–42 (.263)
- League place: 6th
- Managers: Lip Pike, Bob Addy, Jack Manning

The 1877 Cincinnati Reds season was the team's second season in the National League. The team finished sixth and last in the league with a record of 15–42, 25½ games behind the first place Boston Red Caps.

== Regular season ==
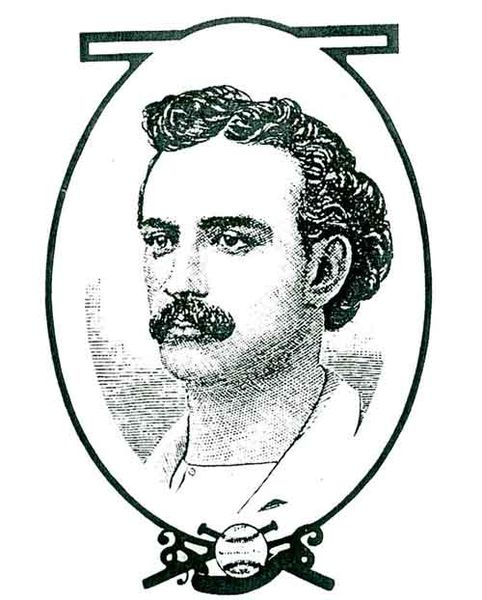
Lip Pike

After finishing dead last in the National League in the 1876 season, the Reds attempted to improve their club by signing Lip Pike, who spent the previous season with the St. Louis Brown Stockings. Pike was also named the manager of the team. Some other off-season additions included Bob Addy, who spent the previous season with the Chicago White Stockings, Jack Manning of the Boston Red Caps, and a couple of new pitchers: Candy Cummings, who had a 16–8 record with a 1.67 ERA with the Hartford Dark Blues, and Bobby Mathews, who had a 21–34 record with New York Mutuals in 1876.

The Reds got off to another terrible start, as they had a 3–11 start to the season, and Pike stepped down as the manager. The team was briefly disbanded by owner Josiah Keck, and although a group of eight businessmen stepped in to rescue the franchise, some Cincinnati players had been signed by other teams in the interim, and some newspapers subsequently refused to list the Red's results. Bob Addy took over as player manager; however, he too saw very few wins as Cincinnati went 5–19 during his managerial stint. Jack Manning then finished the year as player-manager, going 7–12, as the Reds had a 15–42 record and once again finished in the National League cellar, 25.5 games behind the first place Boston Red Caps.

Charley Jones had another solid season for the Reds, hitting .310 with two homers and a team high 36 RBI. Manning also had a solid year, hitting .317, as he had a team high 80 hits while tying Jones with a team high 36 RBI. Pike hit .298 with a team high four home runs, and added 23 RBI. On the mound, rookie Bobby Mitchell came up late in the season and was very impressive, leading Cincinnati with six victories and a team best 3.51 ERA in twelve games.

=== Season standings ===
National League
Team	W	L	Pct.	GB	Home	Road
Boston Red Caps	42	18	.700	—	27‍–‍5	15‍–‍13
Louisville Grays	35	25	.583	7	20‍–‍9	15‍–‍16
Brooklyn Hartfords	31	27	.534	10	19‍–‍8	12‍–‍19
St. Louis Brown Stockings	28	32	.467	14	20‍–‍10	8‍–‍22
Chicago White Stockings	26	33	.441	15½	17‍–‍12	9‍–‍21
Cincinnati Reds	15	42	.263	25½	12‍–‍18	3‍–‍24

=== Record vs. opponents ===
1877 National League record Sources:
Team	BSN	HAR	CHI	CIN	LOU	STL
Boston	—	7–5–1	10–2	11–1	8–4	6–6
Brooklyn	5–7–1	—	8–4	7–3	6–6–1	5–7
Chicago	2–10	4–8	—	8–3–1	4–8	8–4
Cincinnati	1–11	3–7	3–8–1	—	5–7	3–9
Louisville	4–8	6–6–1	8–4	7–5	—	10–2
St. Louis	6–6	7–5	4–8	9–3	2–10	—

=== Game log ===
Legend
Reds Win	Reds Loss	Game Tied/Postponed

1877 Game Log: 15–42 (Home: 12–18; Away: 3–24)
May: 3–7 (Home: 2–6; Away: 1–1)

#	Date	Opponent	Score	Stadium	Attendance	Record	Streak
–	May 3	Grays	Postponed (rain); Makeup: May 14				
–	May 5	Grays	Postponed (unknown reason); Makeup: June 16				
1	May 10	@ Grays	15–9	Louisville Baseball Park	N/A	1–0	W1
2	May 12	@ Grays	8–12	Louisville Baseball Park	N/A	1–1	L1
3	May 14	Grays	6–24	Avenue Grounds	N/A	1–2	L2
4	May 17	Red Caps	0–5	Avenue Grounds	N/A	1–3	L3
5	May 19	Red Caps	2–6	Avenue Grounds	N/A	1–4	L4
6	May 22	Hartfords	4–6	Avenue Grounds	N/A	1–5	L5
7	May 23	Hartfords	4–5	Avenue Grounds	N/A	1–6	L6
8	May 26	White Stockings	7–12	Avenue Grounds	N/A	1–7	L7
9	May 30	White Stockings	5–4	Avenue Grounds	N/A	2–7	W1
10	May 31	Brown Stockings	12–7	Avenue Grounds	N/A	3–7	W2

June: 0–7 (Home: 0–2; Away: 0–5)

#	Date	Opponent	Score	Stadium	Attendance	Record	Streak
11	June 2	Brown Stockings	2–10	Avenue Grounds	N/A	3–8	L1
12	June 5	@ White Stockings	5–12	23rd Street Grounds	N/A	3–9	L2
13	June 7	@ White Stockings	6–11	23rd Street Grounds	N/A	3–10	L3
14	June 9	@ Brown Stockings	2–13	Sportsman's Park	N/A	3–11	L4
15	June 11	@ Brown Stockings	2–11	Sportsman's Park	N/A	3–12	L5
16	June 14	@ Grays	3–10	Louisville Baseball Park	N/A	3–13	L6
17	June 16	Grays	4–8	Avenue Grounds	N/A	3–14	L7
–	June 23	@ Red Caps	Postponed (unknown reason); Makeup: August 24				
–	June 26	@ Red Caps	Postponed (unknown reason); Makeup: September 3				
–	June 28	@ Hartfords	Postponed (unknown reason); Makeup: August 27				

July: 5–6 (Home: 5–6; Away: 0–0)

#	Date	Opponent	Score	Stadium	Attendance	Record	Streak
18	July 3	Grays	3–6	Avenue Grounds	N/A	3–15	L8
19	July 4	Grays	10–1	Avenue Grounds	N/A	4–15	W1
20	July 6	Red Caps	5–10	Avenue Grounds	N/A	4–16	L1
21	July 7	Red Caps	2–3	Avenue Grounds	N/A	4–17	L2
–	July 10	Hartfords	Postponed (rain); Makeup: July 11				
22	July 11	Hartfords	2–6	Avenue Grounds	N/A	4–18	L3
23	July 12	Hartfords	9–15	Avenue Grounds	N/A	4–19	L4
24	July 20	Red Caps	13–11	Avenue Grounds	N/A	5–19	W1
25	July 21	Red Caps	5–7	Avenue Grounds	N/A	5–20	L1
26	July 24	Hartfords	9–8	Avenue Grounds	N/A	6–20	W1
27	July 25	Hartfords	5–1	Avenue Grounds	N/A	7–20	W2
28	July 31	White Stockings	9–1	Avenue Grounds	N/A	8–20	W3

August: 1–14 (Home: 0–3; Away: 1–11)

#	Date	Opponent	Score	Stadium	Attendance	Record	Streak
29	August 2	White Stockings	1–15	Avenue Grounds	N/A	8–21	L1
30	August 4	Brown Stockings	3–5	Avenue Grounds	N/A	8–22	L2
31	August 6	Brown Stockings	2–8	Avenue Grounds	N/A	8–23	L3
32	August 7	@ White Stockings	7–21	23rd Street Grounds	N/A	8–24	L4
33	August 9	@ White Stockings	9–13	23rd Street Grounds	N/A	8–25	L5
34	August 11	@ Brown Stockings	3–6	Sportsman's Park	N/A	8–26	L6
35	August 13	@ Brown Stockings	10–13	Sportsman's Park	N/A	8–27	L7
36	August 17	@ Hartfords	4–12	Union Grounds	N/A	8–28	L8
37	August 18	@ Hartfords	5–8	Union Grounds	N/A	8–29	L9
38	August 21	@ Red Caps	0–7	South End Grounds	N/A	8–30	L10
39	August 23	@ Red Caps	4–10	South End Grounds	N/A	8–31	L11
40	August 24	@ Red Caps	6–8	South End Grounds	N/A	8–32	L12
41	August 27	@ Hartfords	1–5	Union Grounds	N/A	8–33	L13
42	August 28	@ Hartfords	13–7	Union Grounds	N/A	9–33	W1
43	August 30	@ Red Caps	2–9	South End Grounds	N/A	9–34	L1

September: 6–4 (Home: 6–1; Away: 1–3)

#	Date	Opponent	Score	Stadium	Attendance	Record	Streak
44	September 1	@ Red Caps	3–8	South End Grounds	N/A	9–35	L2
45	September 3	@ Red Caps	0–14	South End Grounds	N/A	9–36	L3
46	September 6	Grays	1–0	Avenue Grounds	N/A	10–36	W1
47	September 7	Grays	2–3	Avenue Grounds	N/A	10–37	L1
48	September 8	Grays	6–2	Avenue Grounds	N/A	11–37	W1
49	September 13	@ Grays	7–4	Louisville Baseball Park	N/A	12–37	W2
50	September 14	@ Grays	6–12	Louisville Baseball Park	N/A	12–38	L1
51	September 24	Brown Stockings	5–1	Avenue Grounds	N/A	13–38	W1
52	September 25	Brown Stockings	7–4	Avenue Grounds	N/A	14–38	W2
–	September 27	White Stockings	Postponed (unknown reason); Makeup: September 28				
53	September 28	White Stockings	5–5	Avenue Grounds	N/A	14–38	W2
54	September 29	White Stockings	9–8	Avenue Grounds	N/A	15–38	W3

October: 0–4 (Home: 0–0; Away: 0–4)

#	Date	Opponent	Score	Stadium	Attendance	Record	Streak
55	October 1	@ White Stockings	3–10	23rd Street Grounds	N/A	15–39	L1
56	October 2	@ White Stockings	1–13	23rd Street Grounds	N/A	15–40	L2
57	October 5	@ Brown Stockings	2–11	Sportman's Park	N/A	15–41	L3
58	October 6	@ Brown Stockings	3–7	Sportman's Park	N/A	15–42	L4

=== Roster ===
1877 Cincinnati Reds
Roster
Pitchers: Candy Cummings; Bobby Mathews; Bobby Mitchell; Catchers: Scott Hastings; Nat Hicks; Henry Kessler; George Miller; Harry Smith	Infielders: Amos Booth; Will Foley; Charlie Gould; Jimmy Hallinan; Jack Manning; Levi Meyerle; Billy Redmond; Chub Sullivan	Outfielders: Bob Addy; Ned Cuthbert; Charley Jones; Lip Pike; Johnny Ryan	Manager: Bob Addy; Jack Manning; Lip Pike

== Player stats ==
=== Batting ===
==== Starters by position ====
Note: Pos = Position; G = Games played; AB = At bats; H = Hits; Avg. = Batting average; HR = Home runs; RBI = Runs batted in

Pos	Player	G	AB	H	Avg.	HR	RBI
C	Scott Hastings	20	71	10	.141	0	3
1B	Charlie Gould	24	91	25	.275	0	13
2B	Lip Pike	58	262	78	.298	4	23
3B	Will Foley	56	216	41	.190	0	18
SS	Jack Manning	57	252	80	.317	0	36
OF	Bob Addy	57	245	68	.278	0	31
OF	Charley Jones	55	232	72	.310	2	36
OF	Ned Cuthbert	12	56	10	.179	0	2

==== Other batters ====
Note: G = Games played; AB = At bats; H = Hits; Avg. = Batting average; HR = Home runs; RBI = Runs batted in

Player	G	AB	H	Avg.	HR	RBI
Amos Booth	44	157	27	.172	0	13
Levi Meyerle	27	107	35	.327	0	15
Jimmy Hallinan	16	73	27	.370	0	7
George Miller	11	37	6	.162	0	3
Harry Smith	10	36	9	.250	0	3
Nat Hicks	8	32	6	.188	0	3
Chub Sullivan	8	32	8	.250	0	4
Johnny Ryan	6	26	4	.154	0	2
Henry Kessler	6	20	2	.100	0	0
Billy Redmond	3	12	3	.250	0	3

=== Pitching ===
==== Starting pitchers ====
Note: G = Games pitched; IP = Innings pitched; W = Wins; L = Losses; ERA = Earned run average; SO = Strikeouts

Player	G	IP	W	L	ERA	SO
Candy Cummings	19	155.2	5	14	4.34	11
Bobby Mathews	15	129.1	3	12	4.04	9
Bobby Mitchell	12	100.0	6	5	3.51	41

==== Other pitchers ====
Note: G = Games pitched; IP = Innings pitched; W = Wins; L = Losses; ERA = Earned run average; SO = Strikeouts

Player	G	IP	W	L	ERA	SO
Amos Booth	12	86.0	1	7	3.56	18
Jack Manning	10	44.0	0	4	6.95	6
