= St. Louis Brown Stockings all-time roster =

List of baseball players

The St. Louis Brown Stockings baseball club played one season in the National Association, 1875, and two in the National League, 1876–1877. Here is a list of all their players in regular season games.

† Bold names identify members of the National Baseball Hall of Fame.

== B ==
- Joe Battin
- Joe Blong
- George Bradley

== C ==
- Jack Chapman
- John Clapp
- Art Croft
- Ned Cuthbert

== D ==
- Herman Dehlman
- Mike Dorgan

== F ==
- Frank Fleet
- Davy Force

== G ==
- Pud Galvin^{†}
- Jack Gleason

== H ==
- Bill Hague

== L ==
- Leonidas Lee
- Harry Little
- Tom Loftus

== M ==
- Denny Mack
- Mike McGeary
- Ed McKenna
- Tom Miller (catcher)

== N ==
- T. E. Newell
- Tricky Nichols

== P ==
- Dickey Pearce
- Lip Pike

== R ==
- Jack Remsen

== S ==
- George Seward

== W ==
- Charlie Waitt
