= 1877 St. Louis Brown Stockings season =

1877 St. Louis Brown Stockings
- League: National League
- Ballpark: Sportsman's Park
- City: St. Louis, Missouri
- Record: 28–32 (.467)
- League place: 4th
- Owner: C. O. Bishop
- Manager: George McManus

The 1877 St. Louis Brown Stockings finished the season in fourth place in the National League. After the season, they signed Louisville Grays stars Jim Devlin and George Hall. However, both became involved in a game-fixing scandal that led to the permanent expulsion of the two players (and others) from the league. The Grays and Brown Stockings both folded in the aftermath of the scandal.

== Regular season ==
=== Season standings ===
National League
Team	W	L	Pct.	GB	Home	Road
Boston Red Caps	42	18	.700	—	27‍–‍5	15‍–‍13
Louisville Grays	35	25	.583	7	20‍–‍9	15‍–‍16
Brooklyn Hartfords	31	27	.534	10	19‍–‍8	12‍–‍19
St. Louis Brown Stockings	28	32	.467	14	20‍–‍10	8‍–‍22
Chicago White Stockings	26	33	.441	15½	17‍–‍12	9‍–‍21
Cincinnati Reds	15	42	.263	25½	12‍–‍18	3‍–‍24

=== Record vs. opponents ===
1877 National League record Sources:
Team	BSN	HAR	CHI	CIN	LOU	STL
Boston	—	7–5–1	10–2	11–1	8–4	6–6
Brooklyn	5–7–1	—	8–4	7–3	6–6–1	5–7
Chicago	2–10	4–8	—	8–3–1	4–8	8–4
Cincinnati	1–11	3–7	3–8–1	—	5–7	3–9
Louisville	4–8	6–6–1	8–4	7–5	—	10–2
St. Louis	6–6	7–5	4–8	9–3	2–10	—

=== Roster ===
1877 St. Louis Brown Stockings
Roster
Pitchers: Tricky Nichols; Catchers: John Clapp	Infielders: Joe Battin; Art Croft; Herman Dehlman; Davy Force; Mike McGeary; T. E. Newell; Dickey Pearce	Outfielders: Joe Blong; Mike Dorgan; Jack Gleason; Leonidas Lee; Harry Little; Tom Loftus; Patrick McKenna; Jack Remsen	Manager: George McManus

== Player stats ==
=== Batting ===
==== Starters by position ====
Note: Pos = Position; G = Games played; AB = At bats; H = Hits; Avg. = Batting average; HR = Home runs; RBI = Runs batted in

Pos	Player	G	AB	H	Avg.	HR	RBI
C	John Clapp	60	255	81	.318	0	34
1B	Herman Dehlman	32	119	22	.185	0	11
2B	Mike McGeary	57	258	65	.252	0	20
3B	Joe Battin	57	226	45	.199	1	22
SS	Davy Force	58	225	59	.262	0	22
OF	Mike Dorgan	60	266	82	.308	0	23
OF	Joe Blong	58	218	47	.216	0	13
OF	Jack Remsen	33	123	32	.260	0	13

==== Other batters ====
Note: G = Games played; AB = At bats; H = Hits; Avg. = Batting average; HR = Home runs; RBI = Runs batted in

Player	G	AB	H	Avg.	HR	RBI
Art Croft	54	220	51	.232	0	27
Dickey Pearce	8	29	5	.172	0	4
Leonidas Lee	4	18	5	.278	0	0
Harry Little	3	12	2	.167	0	0
Tom Loftus	3	11	2	.182	0	0
Ed McKenna	1	5	1	.200	0	0
Jack Gleason	1	4	1	.250	0	0
T. E. Newell	1	3	0	.000	0	0

=== Pitching ===
==== Starting pitchers ====
Note: G = Games pitched; IP = Innings pitched; W = Wins; L = Losses; ERA = Earned run average; SO = Strikeouts

Player	G	IP	W	L	ERA	SO
Tricky Nichols	42	350.0	18	23	2.60	80
Joe Blong	25	187.1	10	9	2.74	51

==== Relief pitchers ====
Note: G = Games pitched; W = Wins; L = Losses; SV = Saves; ERA = Earned run average; SO = Strikeouts

Player	G	W	L	SV	ERA	SO
Joe Battin	1	0	0	0	4.91	1
