= 1877 Brooklyn Hartfords season =

1877 Brooklyn Hartfords
- League: National League
- Ballpark: Union Grounds
- City: Brooklyn, New York
- Record: 31–27 (.534)
- League place: 3rd
- Owner: Morgan Bulkeley
- Manager: Bob Ferguson

The Hartford Dark Blues moved to Brooklyn, New York prior to the 1877 season and were renamed as the Brooklyn Hartfords. This was to be the Hartfords' last season, as they disbanded following the completion of their schedule.

== Regular season ==
=== Season standings ===
National League
Team	W	L	Pct.	GB	Home	Road
Boston Red Caps	42	18	.700	—	27‍–‍5	15‍–‍13
Louisville Grays	35	25	.583	7	20‍–‍9	15‍–‍16
Brooklyn Hartfords	31	27	.534	10	19‍–‍8	12‍–‍19
St. Louis Brown Stockings	28	32	.467	14	20‍–‍10	8‍–‍22
Chicago White Stockings	26	33	.441	15½	17‍–‍12	9‍–‍21
Cincinnati Reds	15	42	.263	25½	12‍–‍18	3‍–‍24

=== Record vs. opponents ===
1877 National League record Sources:
Team	BSN	HAR	CHI	CIN	LOU	STL
Boston	—	7–5–1	10–2	11–1	8–4	6–6
Brooklyn	5–7–1	—	8–4	7–3	6–6–1	5–7
Chicago	2–10	4–8	—	8–3–1	4–8	8–4
Cincinnati	1–11	3–7	3–8–1	—	5–7	3–9
Louisville	4–8	6–6–1	8–4	7–5	—	10–2
St. Louis	6–6	7–5	4–8	9–3	2–10	—

=== Roster ===
1877 Brooklyn Hartfords
Roster
Pitchers: Terry Larkin; Catchers: Doug Allison; Bill Harbridge	Infielders: Jack Burdock; Tom Carey; Bob Ferguson; Joe Start	Outfielders: John Bass; Josh Bunce; John Cassidy; Jim Holdsworth; John Maloney; Israel Pike; Live Oak Taylor; Tom York	Manager: Bob Ferguson

== Player stats ==
=== Batting ===
==== Starters by position ====
Note: Pos = Position; G = Games played; AB = At bats; H = Hits; Avg. = Batting average; HR = Home runs; RBI = Runs batted in

Pos	Player	G	AB	H	Avg.	HR	RBI
C	Bill Harbridge	41	167	37	.222	0	8
1B	Joe Start	60	271	90	.332	1	21
2B	Jack Burdock	58	277	72	.256	0	35
3B	Bob Ferguson	58	254	65	.256	0	35
SS	Tom Carey	60	274	70	.255	1	20
OF	John Cassidy	60	251	95	.378	0	27
OF	Tom York	56	237	67	.283	1	37
OF	Jim Holdsworth	55	260	66	.254	0	20

==== Other batters ====
Note: G = Games played; AB = At bats; H = Hits; Avg. = Batting average; HR = Home runs; RBI = Runs batted in

Player	G	AB	H	Avg.	HR	RBI
Doug Allison	29	115	17	.148	0	6
Live Oak Taylor	2	8	3	.375	0	0
John Bass	1	4	1	.250	0	0
Josh Bunce	1	4	0	.000	0	0
John Maloney	1	4	1	.250	0	0
Israel Pike	1	4	1	.250	0	0

=== Pitching ===
==== Starting pitchers ====
Note: G = Games pitched; IP = Innings pitched; W = Wins; L = Losses; ERA = Earned run average; SO = Strikeouts

Player	G	IP	W	L	ERA	SO
Terry Larkin	56	501.0	29	25	2.14	96
John Cassidy	2	18.0	1	1	5.00	2

==== Other pitchers ====
Note: G = Games pitched; IP = Innings pitched; W = Wins; L = Losses; ERA = Earned run average; SO = Strikeouts

Player	G	IP	W	L	ERA	SO
Bob Ferguson	3	25.0	1	1	3.96	1
