= Josh Bunce =

American baseball player and umpire (1847–1912)

- Left fielder
- Born: May 10, 1847; Brooklyn, New York, U.S.
- Died: April 28, 1912 (aged 64); Brooklyn, New York, U.S.
- Batted: Unknown Threw: Unknown

MLB debut
- August 27, 1877, for the Brooklyn Hartfords

Last MLB appearance
- August 27, 1877, for the Brooklyn Hartfords

MLB statistics
- Batting average: .000
- Hits: 0
- Runs: 0
- Stats at Baseball Reference

Teams
- Brooklyn Hartfords (1877)

Joshua Bunce (May 10, 1847 – April 28, 1912) was an American left fielder and umpire in Major League Baseball who played in one game for the Brooklyn Hartfords in 1877 and was hitless in four at bats.

Born in Brooklyn, New York, Bunce had been a member of several amateur baseball clubs in the New York area, such as the Nassau Club and the Brooklyn Baseball Club. He served as captain of the Nassau Club. Bunce also served as an umpire in the National League for seven games in 1877 – four of them prior to his sole appearance as a player and three after – and was umpiring amateur baseball games in the New York area as late as 1897. Bunce also worked for the Brooklyn Fire Department. He died of heart disease in his home on Bedford Avenue at age 64.

== Major league game ==
Bunce played one game for the National League Hartfords on August 27, 1877; the game was played at Union Grounds in Brooklyn. According to The New York Times, "The Hartfords were short the services of three of their best players—York, Holdsworth, and Ferguson. Their places, however, were very acceptably filled by Pike and Bunce, two amateur [sic] players, and Habridge, the regular substitute of the club." The Hartfords beat the Cincinnati Red Stockings 5–1. Terry Larkin was the winning pitcher and Amos Booth was the loser. Bunce played left field and made one putout. The reporter for the Times summarized, "The game was tedious and uninteresting, and was witnessed by about 200 persons."
