= 1877 Chicago White Stockings season =

1877 Chicago White Stockings
- League: National League
- Ballpark: 23rd Street Grounds
- City: Chicago
- Record: 26–33 (.441)
- League place: 5th
- Owner: William Hulbert
- Manager: Albert Spalding

The 1877 Chicago White Stockings season was the 6th season of the Chicago White Stockings franchise, the 2nd in the National League and the fourth at 23rd Street Grounds. The White Stockings finished fifth in the National League with a record of 26–33.

== Regular season ==
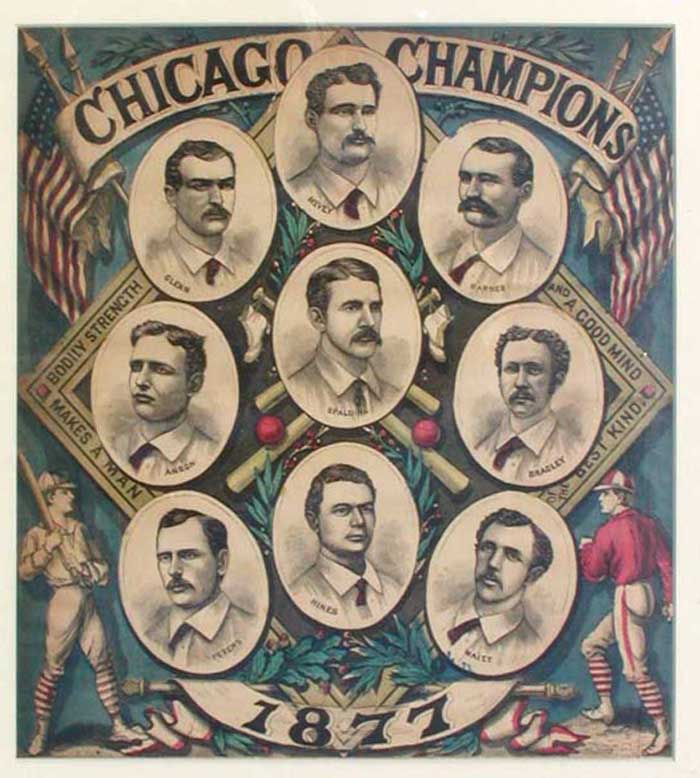
The 1877 Chicago White Stockings

=== Season standings ===
National League
Team	W	L	Pct.	GB	Home	Road
Boston Red Caps	42	18	.700	—	27‍–‍5	15‍–‍13
Louisville Grays	35	25	.583	7	20‍–‍9	15‍–‍16
Brooklyn Hartfords	31	27	.534	10	19‍–‍8	12‍–‍19
St. Louis Brown Stockings	28	32	.467	14	20‍–‍10	8‍–‍22
Chicago White Stockings	26	33	.441	15½	17‍–‍12	9‍–‍21
Cincinnati Reds	15	42	.263	25½	12‍–‍18	3‍–‍24

=== Record vs. opponents ===
1877 National League record Sources:
Team	BSN	HAR	CHI	CIN	LOU	STL
Boston	—	7–5–1	10–2	11–1	8–4	6–6
Brooklyn	5–7–1	—	8–4	7–3	6–6–1	5–7
Chicago	2–10	4–8	—	8–3–1	4–8	8–4
Cincinnati	1–11	3–7	3–8–1	—	5–7	3–9
Louisville	4–8	6–6–1	8–4	7–5	—	10–2
St. Louis	6–6	7–5	4–8	9–3	2–10	—

=== Roster ===
1877 Chicago White Stockings
Roster
Pitchers: George Bradley; Laurie Reis; Catchers: Cal McVey	Infielders: Cap Anson; Ross Barnes; Cherokee Fisher; John Peters; Harry Smith; Albert Spalding	Outfielders: Charlie Eden; Dave Eggler; John Glenn; Jimmy Hallinan; Paul Hines; Charley Jones; Paddy Quinn; Dave Rowe; Charlie Waitt	Manager: Albert Spalding

== Player stats ==
=== Batting ===
==== Starters by position ====
Note: Pos = Position; G = Games played; AB = At bats; H = Hits; Avg. = Batting average; HR = Home runs; RBI = Runs batted in

Pos	Player	G	AB	H	Avg.	HR	RBI
C	Cal McVey	60	266	98	.368	0	36
1B	Albert Spalding	60	254	65	.256	0	35
2B	Ross Barnes	22	92	25	.272	0	5
3B	Cap Anson	59	255	86	.337	0	32
SS	John Peters	60	265	84	.317	0	41
OF	Paul Hines	60	261	73	.280	0	23
OF	John Glenn	50	202	46	.228	0	20
OF	Dave Eggler	33	136	36	.265	0	20

==== Other batters ====
Note: G = Games played; AB = At bats; H = Hits; Avg. = Batting average; HR = Home runs; RBI = Runs batted in

Player	G	AB	H	Avg.	HR	RBI
Harry Smith	24	94	19	.202	0	3
Jimmy Hallinan	19	89	25	.281	0	11
Charlie Eden	15	55	12	.218	0	5
Charlie Waitt	10	41	4	.098	0	2
Paddy Quinn	4	14	1	.071	0	0
Charley Jones	2	8	3	.375	0	2
Dave Rowe	2	7	2	.286	0	0
Cherokee Fisher	1	4	0	.000	0	0

=== Pitching ===
==== Starting pitchers ====
Note: G = Games pitched; IP = Innings pitched; W = Wins; L = Losses; ERA = Earned run average; SO = Strikeouts

Player	G	IP	W	L	ERA	SO
George Bradley	50	394.0	18	23	3.31	59
Laurie Reis	4	36.0	3	1	0.75	11
Dave Rowe	1	1.0	0	1	18.00	0

==== Other pitchers ====
Note: G = Games pitched; IP = Innings pitched; W = Wins; L = Losses; ERA = Earned run average; SO = Strikeouts

Player	G	IP	W	L	ERA	SO
Cal McVey	17	92.0	4	8	4.50	20
Albert Spalding	4	11.0	1	0	3.27	2
