= 1877 Major League Baseball season =

1877 MLB season
- League: National League (NL)
- Sport: Baseball
- Duration: April 30 – October 6, 1877
- Games: 60
- Teams: 6

Pennant winner
- NL champions: Boston Red Caps
- NL runners-up: Louisville Grays

MLB seasons
- ← 1876 1878 →

Locations of teams for the 1877 National League season
National League

The 1877 major league baseball season was contested from April 30 through October 6, 1877, and saw the Boston Red Caps as the pennant winner of the second season of the National League. There was no postseason.

Over the off-season, in December 1876, two teams were formally kicked out of the league for failing to fulfill their schedules: New York Mutuals and Philadelphia Athletics, contracting the league from eight to six teams.

The Hartford Dark Blue would relocate from Hartford, Connecticut to Brooklyn, New York, as the Brooklyn Hartfords.

== Schedule ==
The 1877 schedule consisted of 60 games for all six teams of the National League. Each team was scheduled to play 12 games against the other five teams in the league. This was the first season that the National League adopted the format. The format would last only through the following season.

Opening Day took place on April 30 featuring a game between the Boston Red Caps and Brooklyn Hartfords. The final day of the season was on October 6, featuring four teams.

== Rule changes ==
The 1877 season saw the following rule changes:

- New rules reemphasizing the need to fulfill team schedules are implemented.
- New scheduling rules were implemented. If the league has:
  - six or seven teams, each team must play twelve games against other teams,
  - eight or nine teams, each team must play ten games against other teams,
  - ten teams, each team must play eight games against other teams.
- Each team is entitled to play half of their games at home.
- Any team refusing to play a scheduled game will be immediately expelled.
- The batter's box was moved forward by one foot so that it was equidistant forward and aft from the center of home plate.
- A fair ball is now defined as one "batted directly to the ground that bound or roll within the foul lines between home and first or home and third base, without first touching the person of a player ... [and designated as foul] all balls batted directly to the ground that bound or roll outside the foul lines between home and first or home and third bases, without first touching the person of a player ... In either of these cases the first point of contact between the batted ball and the ground shall not be regarded." Previously, the first point of contact between the batted ball and the ground determined whether a ball was fair or foul.
- The National League adopted an official ball.
- For the 1877 season only, a rule forcing home teams to bat first was implemented, a change from the coin-toss by team captains procedure.
- Baserunners were instructed to run, not walk, back to the base where they began whenever required to do so.
- Baserunners are now required to run behind a fielder in the basepath who was legally attempting to field a ball.
- If the baserunner is hit by a ball, they are out.
- The basepath was defined as extending from the foul line to three feet to tis right, and any baserunner who ran outside this area from the batter's box to first base would be declared out.
- Canvas bases 15 inches square were introduced.
- Home plate was placed in the angle formed by the intersection of the first and third base lines, moving entire into fair territory.
- Player reserve clause was written into the contracts for the first time.
- The hitter was exempted from a time at bat if he walked.

== Teams ==
League	Team	City	Ballpark	Capacity	Manager
National League	Boston Red Caps	Boston, Massachusetts	South End Grounds	3,000	Harry Wright
National League	Brooklyn Hartfords	Brooklyn, New York	Union Grounds	1,500	Bob Ferguson
National League	Chicago White Stockings	Chicago, Illinois	23rd Street Grounds	7,000	Albert Spalding
National League	Cincinnati Reds	Cincinnati, Ohio	Avenue Grounds	Unknown	Lip Pike
National League	Cincinnati Reds	Cincinnati, Ohio	Avenue Grounds	Unknown	Bob Addy
National League	Cincinnati Reds	Cincinnati, Ohio	Avenue Grounds	Unknown	Jack Manning
National League	Louisville Grays	Louisville, Kentucky	Louisville Baseball Park	4,500	Jack Chapman
National League	St. Louis Brown Stockings	St. Louis, Missouri	Grand Avenue Ball Grounds	Unknown	George McManus

=== Neutral site games ===
The Brooklyn Hartfords hosted a neutral site game.

Team	City	Ballpark	Capacity	Games played
Brooklyn Hartfords	New Haven, Connecticut	Howard Avenue Grounds	Unknown	1

1. In today's New York, New York.

== Standings ==
=== National League ===
National League
Team	W	L	Pct.	GB	Home	Road
Boston Red Caps	42	18	.700	—	27‍–‍5	15‍–‍13
Louisville Grays	35	25	.583	7	20‍–‍9	15‍–‍16
Brooklyn Hartfords	31	27	.534	10	19‍–‍8	12‍–‍19
St. Louis Brown Stockings	28	32	.467	14	20‍–‍10	8‍–‍22
Chicago White Stockings	26	33	.441	15½	17‍–‍12	9‍–‍21
Cincinnati Reds	15	42	.263	25½	12‍–‍18	3‍–‍24

=== Tie games ===
Three tie games, which are not factored into winning percentage or games behind occurred throughout the season (though standings were determined by total wins, not winning percentage).

The Brooklyn Hartfords had two tie games. The Boston Red Caps, Chicago White Stockings, Cincinnati Reds, and Louisville Grays had one tie game each.

- April 30, Boston Red Caps vs. Brooklyn Hartfords, tied at 1.
- August 23, Louisville Grays vs. Brooklyn Hartfords, tied at 1.
- September 28, Chicago White Stockings vs. Cincinnati Reds, tied at 5.

== Managerial changes ==
=== Off-season ===
Team	Former Manager	New Manager
Cincinnati Reds	Charlie Gould	Lip Pike
New York Mutuals	Bill Craver	Team folded
Philadelphia Athletics	Al Wright	Team folded

=== In-season ===
Team	Former Manager	New Manager
Cincinnati Reds	Lip Pike	Bob Addy
Cincinnati Reds	Bob Addy	Jack Manning

== League leaders ==
=== National League ===
Hitting leaders
Stat	Player	Total
AVG	Deacon White (BSN)	.387
OPS	Deacon White (BSN)	.950
HR	Lip Pike (CIN)	4
RBI	Deacon White (BSN)	49
R	Jim O'Rourke (BSN)	68
H	Deacon White (BSN)	103

Pitching leaders
Stat	Player	Total
W	Tommy Bond (BSN)	40
L	Jim Devlin (LOU); Terry Larkin (HAR)	25
ERA	Tommy Bond (BSN)	2.11
K	Tommy Bond (BSN)	170
IP	Jim Devlin (LOU)	559.0
SV	Cal McVey (CHI)	2
WHIP	Tommy Bond (BSN)	1.086

== Venues ==
The Brooklyn Hartfords, newly relocated from Hartford, Connecticut where they played as the Hartford Dark Blues, leave the Hartford Ball Club Grounds after playing there for three seasons since their National Association days from 1874, moving into Union Grounds where they would play until they folded at season's end.

The Chicago White Stockings would play their final game at 23rd Street Grounds on October 6 against the Louisville Grays, moving to Lakefront Park for the start of the 1878 season.

The Brooklyn Hartfords hosted a neutral site game against the Chicago White Stockings on their last home game of the season, September 22, at the site of the former National Association's New Haven Elm Citys, at the Howard Avenue Grounds in New Haven, Connecticut.

== See also ==
- 1877 in baseball (Events, Births, Deaths)
