= Utility player (baseball) =

Role on a baseball team

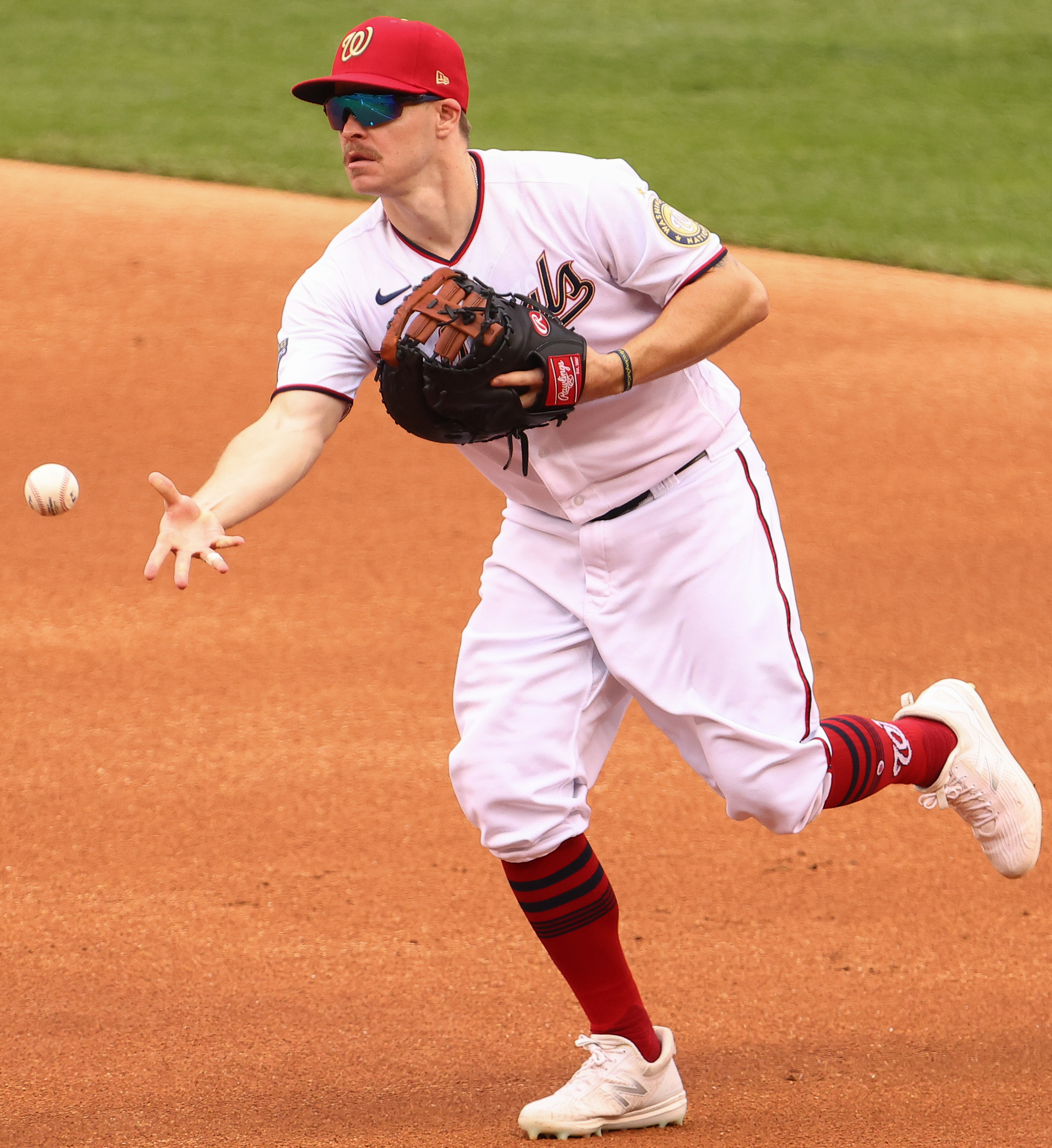
Brock Holt has played for several teams in Major League Baseball (MLB) as a utility player.

In baseball, a utility player or utility man is a player who has the ability to play more than one position in the field and is primarily used as a substitute. The term super utility player may be used to refer to a player who can play all or most positions, or a player who regularly appears in the starting lineup at different positions.

== Description ==
Utility infielders typically play both second base and shortstop, sometimes also third base, and more rarely first base. A "fourth outfielder" is likewise an outfielder who can play all three outfield positions but does not have the hitting skills to be a starting player. Some utility players have the defensive ability to play in both the infield and outfield—recent players in Major League Baseball (MLB) fitting this description include Marwin González, Brock Holt, Cory Spangenberg, Ben Zobrist, and José Caballero.

Playing time for fourth outfielders has been called "erratic and unpredictable". Often, fourth outfielders are outfield prospects who have not settled on one outfield position when arriving in the major leagues, veteran players seeking additional playing time to extend their careers, or part-time position players who double as designated hitters. Often, the fourth outfielder can be used in a platoon system against certain pitchers; for example, one outfielder will play only when the starting pitcher is a right-handed pitcher and the other plays only when the starting pitcher is a left-handed pitcher, if one player's performance is better against certain types of pitchers.

== Notable utility players ==
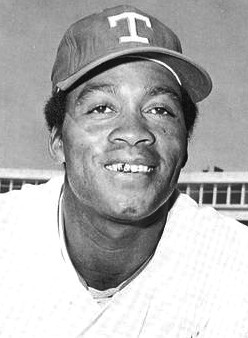
César Tovar played every position during his MLB career.

One of the earliest uses of the phrase in print was in The Cincinnati Enquirer in 1877 when Amos Booth of the Cincinnati Reds was described as "without doubt, the best utility player in the country." That season, he played shortstop, pitcher, catcher, second base, third base and outfield.

Within MLB, César Tovar, Cookie Rojas, Bert Campaneris, Shane Halter, Don Kelly, Jose Oquendo Scott Sheldon, and Andrew Romine all played every position (including pitcher) during their respective careers, with Tovar, Campaneris, Halter, Sheldon, and Romine all doing it in one game.

In 1991, the Detroit Tigers' Tony Phillips was the first player to start 10 games at five different positions in the same season.

In 2005, Chone Figgins started 48 games at third, 45 in center field and 36 at second, and finished 17th in American League Most Valuable Player balloting.

Second baseman Ben Zobrist played first base, second base, third base, shortstop and outfield; José Bautista played first base, second base, third base, and outfield; and Josh Harrison played second base, shortstop, third base, outfield, and pitcher. All three were named All Stars while playing multiple positions in their All-Star seasons. Zobrist and Bautista both finished in the top 10 in MVP voting while starting at least 40 games at two different defensive positions.

In 2015, Brock Holt of the Boston Red Sox was the first player ever to be selected to the All Star Game after starting at seven or more positions before the All-Star break.

Willians Astudillo played every position except for shortstop in his major league career.

== See also ==
- Two-way player
- All rounder
