= Patrick McKenna (disambiguation) =

Patrick McKenna (born 1960) is a Canadian actor.

Patrick McKenna may also refer to:

- Patrick McKenna (Ingenious Media) (born 1956), chief executive of Ingenious Media
- Patrick McKenna (bishop) (1868–1942), Roman Catholic Bishop of Clogher in Ireland
- Patrick McKenna (Irish politician), Irish politician and farmer
- Patrick McKenna, a character in the film Angels & Demons
- Pat McKenna (footballer) (1920–1995), Scottish footballer, played for Aberdeen, Plymouth Argyle and St. Johnstone
- Patrick McKenna (baseball) (1854–1922), Major League Baseball center fielder
- Patrick McKenna, informer for the Great Train Robbery in 1963
