= Henry Kessler (baseball) =

American baseball player (c. 1847–1900)

- Shortstop
- Born: c. 1847; Brooklyn, New York, U.S.
- Died: January 9, 1900 (aged 52–53); Franklin, Pennsylvania, U.S.
- Batted: Right Threw: Right

MLB debut
- August 4, 1873, for the Brooklyn Atlantics

Last MLB appearance
- June 16, 1877, for the Cincinnati Reds

MLB statistics
- Batting average: .253
- Home runs: 0
- Runs batted in: 23
- Stats at Baseball Reference

Teams
- Brooklyn Atlantics (1873–1875); Cincinnati Reds (1876–1877)

Henry Kessler (c. 1847 – January 9, 1900) was an American Major League Baseball player who played mainly shortstop for the Brooklyn Atlantics of the National Association and the Cincinnati Reds of the National League.

Kessler was born in Brooklyn, New York sometime in or around 1847. He made his National Association debut on August 4, 1873, and played in his only game of the season on the date. He collected one hit in five at bats, also getting a run batted in. The Atlantics defeated the Elizabeth Resolutes 16–8 in that game. He played in 14 games in 1874. On September 30, he broke his thumb while playing catcher. His team had to continue the game with only 8 players (their centerfielder came in to play catcher.) In spite of all this, the Atlantics actually won the game 9-8. Kessler finished the 1874 season with a .304 batting average and four runs batted in. In 1875, Kessler played in 25 of the Atlantics' 44 games. He batted .248 with 26 hits in 105 at bats. The Atlantics went 2–42 in 1875, and Brooklyn and the National Association folded after the season.

After 1875, Kessler played for the Cincinnati Reds of the National League in both 1876 and 1877. He finished with a .246 batting average in his two seasons in Cincinnati, playing in 59 games in 1876 and 6 games in 1877. His 47 errors at shortstop in 1876 were the second most in the league. The Reds were losing teams in each of Kessler's two years, placing 8th in the National League standing in 1876, and 6th in 1877.

Kessler would not play in the majors after 1877. He played for several minor league teams until the late 1880s. In 1884, he played for both Franklin of the Iron & Oil Association and Hamilton in the Ohio State League. Kessler also played with the Columbus Senators in the Tri-State League in 1888.

On January 9, 1900, Kessler died in Franklin, Pennsylvania at the age of 53. As of 2012, he is the only former major league player to die in Franklin. He was buried at County Poor Farm Cemetery in Sugar Creek, Pennsylvania.
