= 1877 Louisville Grays season =

1877 Louisville Grays
- League: National League
- Ballpark: Louisville Baseball Park
- City: Louisville, Kentucky
- Record: 35–25 (.583)
- League place: 2nd
- Owners: Walter N. Haldeman, Charles Chase
- Manager: Jack Chapman

The 1877 Louisville Grays were the victim of Major League Baseball's first gambling scandal. Pitcher Jim Devlin, outfielder George Hall, utility player Al Nichols and shortstop Bill Craver were accused of throwing games at the end of the season. All four were banned from baseball for life. The team was unable to continue and folded after the season.

== Regular season ==
After a spectacular start that included a 27–13 record to begin the season, the Grays mysteriously lost seven games in a row. Players bobbled the ball, seemed to slow between bases, and swung suspiciously wide. The result was that the Grays lost the pennant. More recent historical analysis has shown that there is no evidence the Grays sold the pennant. Instead, the club went into a collective hitting slump while the Boston Red Stockings won 20 of their final 21 games to take the pennant.Jones, Wendell Lloyd, The Louisville Grays and the Myth of Baseball's First Great Scandal, McFarland, 2024.

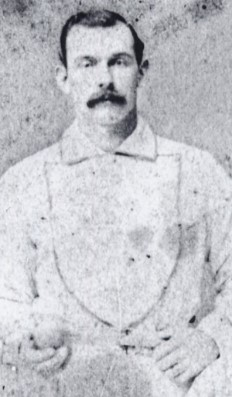
Pitcher Jim Devlin

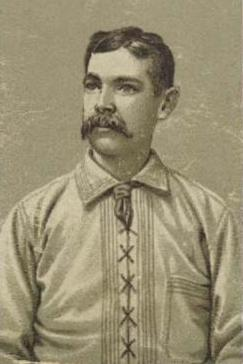
Second baseman Joe Gerhardt

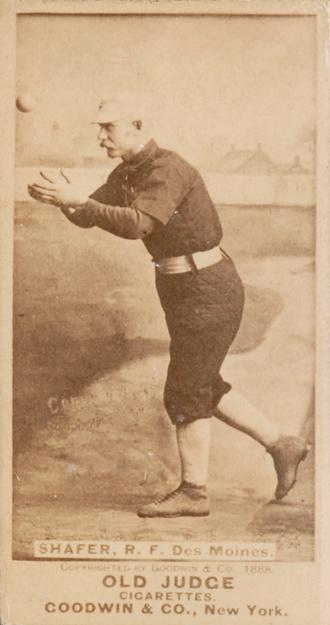
Right fielder Orator Shafer

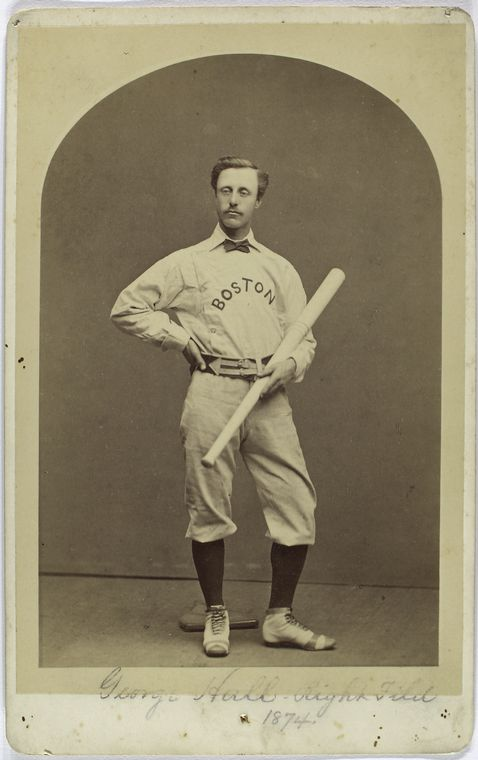
Left fielder George Hall

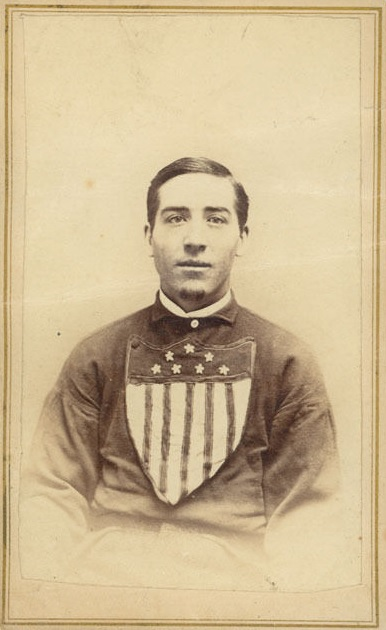
Shortstop Bill Craver

=== Season standings ===
National League
Team	W	L	Pct.	GB	Home	Road
Boston Red Caps	42	18	.700	—	27‍–‍5	15‍–‍13
Louisville Grays	35	25	.583	7	20‍–‍9	15‍–‍16
Brooklyn Hartfords	31	27	.534	10	19‍–‍8	12‍–‍19
St. Louis Brown Stockings	28	32	.467	14	20‍–‍10	8‍–‍22
Chicago White Stockings	26	33	.441	15½	17‍–‍12	9‍–‍21
Cincinnati Reds	15	42	.263	25½	12‍–‍18	3‍–‍24

=== Record vs. opponents ===
1877 National League record Sources:
Team	BSN	HAR	CHI	CIN	LOU	STL
Boston	—	7–5–1	10–2	11–1	8–4	6–6
Brooklyn	5–7–1	—	8–4	7–3	6–6–1	5–7
Chicago	2–10	4–8	—	8–3–1	4–8	8–4
Cincinnati	1–11	3–7	3–8–1	—	5–7	3–9
Louisville	4–8	6–6–1	8–4	7–5	—	10–2
St. Louis	6–6	7–5	4–8	9–3	2–10	—

=== Roster ===
1877 Louisville Grays
Roster
Pitchers: Jim Devlin; Catchers: Pop Snyder	Infielders: Bill Craver; Joe Gerhardt; Bill Hague; John Haldeman; Juice Latham; Harry Little; Al Nichols	Outfielders: Bill Crowley; George Hall; Flip Lafferty; Orator Shafer	Manager: Jack Chapman

== Player stats ==
=== Batting ===
==== Starters by position ====
Note: Pos = Position; G = Games played; AB = At bats; H = Hits; Avg. = Batting average; HR = Home runs; RBI = Runs batted in

Pos	Player	G	AB	H	Avg.	HR	RBI
C	Pop Snyder	61	248	64	.258	2	28
1B	Juice Latham	59	278	81	.291	0	22
2B	Joe Gerhardt	59	250	76	.304	1	35
3B	Bill Hague	59	263	70	.266	1	24
SS	Bill Craver	57	238	63	.265	0	29
OF	George Hall	61	269	87	.323	0	26
OF	Orator Shafer	61	260	74	.285	3	34
OF	Bill Crowley	61	238	67	.282	1	23

==== Other batters ====
Note: G = Games played; AB = At bats; H = Hits; Avg. = Batting average; HR = Home runs; RBI = Runs batted in

Player	G	AB	H	Avg.	HR	RBI
Al Nichols	6	19	4	.211	0	0
Flip Lafferty	4	17	1	.059	0	0
John Haldeman	1	4	0	.000	0	0
Harry Little	1	3	0	.000	0	0

=== Pitching ===
==== Starting pitchers ====
Note: G = Games pitched; IP = Innings pitched; W = Wins; L = Losses; ERA = Earned run average; SO = Strikeouts

Player	G	IP	W	L	ERA	SO
Jim Devlin	61	559.0	35	25	2.25	141
