= Live Taylor =

American baseball player (1851–1888)

- Center fielder
- Born: February 3, 1851; Belfast, Maine, U.S.
- Died: February 19, 1888 (aged 37); San Francisco, California, U.S.
- Batted: Unknown Threw: Unknown

MLB debut
- August 21, 1877, for the Hartford Dark Blues

Last MLB appearance
- July 30, 1884, for the Pittsburgh Alleghenys

MLB statistics
- Batting average: .218
- Hits: 56
- Runs batted in: 8
- Stats at Baseball Reference

Teams
- Hartford Dark Blues (1877); Troy Trojans (1879); Pittsburgh Alleghenys (1884)

George Edward "Live" Taylor (February 3, 1851 – February 19, 1888) was an American professional baseball outfielder, playing three seasons in Major League Baseball. He played in two games in 1877 with the Hartford Dark Blues, 24 games in 1879 with the Troy Trojans, and 41 games in 1884 with the Pittsburgh Alleghenys.

Taylor died of tuberculosis on February 19, 1888. He was interred at Cypress Lawn Memorial Park.

== Sources ==
- Career statistics from MLB · Baseball Reference · Baseball Reference (Minors) · Retrosheet · Baseball Almanac
- Guschov, Stephen (1998). The Red Stockings of Cincinnati. Jefferson, N. C.: McFarland & Co.
