= Israel Pike =

American baseball player (1853–1925)

- Outfielder
- Born: December 1853; Brooklyn, New York, U.S.
- Died: February 10, 1925 (aged 71); Nassau County, New York, U.S.
- Batted: Left Threw: Left

MLB debut
- August 27, 1877, for the Brooklyn Hartfords

Last MLB appearance
- August 27, 1877, for the Brooklyn Hartfords

MLB statistics
- Batting average: .250
- Home runs: 0
- hits: 1
- Stats at Baseball Reference

Teams
- Brooklyn Hartfords (1877)

Israel Emanuel Pike (December 1853 – February 10, 1925) was an American 19th-century baseball outfielder, who played in one Major League Baseball game during the 1877 season.

== Early life ==
Pike was born in Brooklyn, New York, in December 1853.

== Baseball career ==
Pike batted and threw left-handed. He was Jewish. His brother, Lipman Emanuel "Lip" Pike, had much more renown and is a member of the International Jewish Sports Hall of Fame.

Pike's major league career, statistically speaking, was only slightly different than that of Red Bluhm, Eddie Gaedel, or Moonlight Graham. On August 27, 1877, he appeared in one game for the Brooklyn Hartfords of the National League. Pike collected one hit in four at bats in his only game for a .250 batting average, but he made an error in the outfield.

Pike also played the outfield for the Lowell, Massachusetts team that won the 1875 state championship and claimed the New England title. That same year, he also served as an umpire in the National Association.

== Later life ==
Following his baseball career, Pike married Rebecca Fox, with whom he raised five children, and worked as a haberdasher.
