= 1877 Boston Red Caps season =

1877 Boston Red Caps
- National League champions
- League: National League
- Ballpark: South End Grounds
- City: Boston, Massachusetts
- Record: 42–18 (.700)
- League place: 1st
- Owner: Arthur Soden
- Manager: Harry Wright

The 1877 Boston Red Caps season was the seventh season of the franchise. Arthur Soden became the new owner of the franchise, who won their first National League pennant.

== Regular season ==
=== Season standings ===
National League
Team	W	L	Pct.	GB	Home	Road
Boston Red Caps	42	18	.700	—	27‍–‍5	15‍–‍13
Louisville Grays	35	25	.583	7	20‍–‍9	15‍–‍16
Brooklyn Hartfords	31	27	.534	10	19‍–‍8	12‍–‍19
St. Louis Brown Stockings	28	32	.467	14	20‍–‍10	8‍–‍22
Chicago White Stockings	26	33	.441	15½	17‍–‍12	9‍–‍21
Cincinnati Reds	15	42	.263	25½	12‍–‍18	3‍–‍24

=== Record vs. opponents ===
1877 National League record Sources:
Team	BSN	HAR	CHI	CIN	LOU	STL
Boston	—	7–5–1	10–2	11–1	8–4	6–6
Brooklyn	5–7–1	—	8–4	7–3	6–6–1	5–7
Chicago	2–10	4–8	—	8–3–1	4–8	8–4
Cincinnati	1–11	3–7	3–8–1	—	5–7	3–9
Louisville	4–8	6–6–1	8–4	7–5	—	10–2
St. Louis	6–6	7–5	4–8	9–3	2–10	—

=== Roster ===
1877 Boston Red Caps
Roster
Pitchers: Tommy Bond; Will White; Catchers: Lew Brown	Infielders: John Morrill; Ezra Sutton; Deacon White; George Wright	Outfielders: Andy Leonard; Tim Murnane; Jim O'Rourke; Harry Schafer; Harry Wright	Manager: Harry Wright

== Player stats ==
=== Batting ===
==== Starters by position ====
Note: Pos = Position; G = Games played; AB = At bats; H = Hits; Avg. = Batting average; HR = Home runs; RBI = Runs batted in

Pos	Player	G	AB	H	Avg.	HR	RBI
C	Lew Brown	58	221	56	.253	1	31
1B	Deacon White	59	266	103	.387	2	49
2B	George Wright	61	290	80	.276	0	35
3B	John Morrill	61	242	73	.302	0	28
SS	Ezra Sutton	58	253	74	.292	0	39
OF	Jim O'Rourke	61	265	96	.362	0	23
OF	Andy Leonard	58	272	78	.287	0	27
OF	Tim Murnane	35	140	39	.279	1	15

==== Other batters ====
Note: G = Games played; AB = At bats; H = Hits; Avg. = Batting average; HR = Home runs; RBI = Runs batted in

Player	G	AB	H	Avg.	HR	RBI
Harry Schafer	33	141	39	.277	0	13
Harry Wright	1	4	0	.000	0	0

=== Pitching ===
==== Starting pitchers ====
Note: G = Games pitched; IP = Innings pitched; W = Wins; L = Losses; ERA = Earned run average; SO = Strikeouts

Player	G	IP	W	L	ERA	SO
Tommy Bond	58	521.0	40	17	2.11	170
Will White	3	27.0	2	1	3.00	7
