= Robert Maloney (baseball) =

American baseball player (1856–1908)

- Center fielder
- Born: 1856; Unknown
- Died: May 31, 1908 (aged 51–52); Brooklyn, New York
- Batted: Unknown Threw: Unknown

MLB debut
- September 15, 1876, for the New York Mutuals

Last MLB appearance
- August 28, 1877, for the Hartford Dark Blues

MLB statistics
- Games played: 3
- Runs scored: 1
- Hits: 3
- Batting average: .273

Teams
- New York Mutuals (1876); Hartford Dark Blues (1877)

Robert Kissam Maloney (1856 – May 31, 1908), was a professional baseball player who played as a center fielder for three games over two seasons in Major League Baseball. He played two games for the New York Mutuals in 1876, and one for the Hartford Dark Blues in 1877.
