= Charlie Eden =

American baseball player (1855–1920)

- Outfielder
- Born: January 18, 1855; Lexington, Kentucky, U.S.
- Died: September 17, 1920 (aged 65); Cincinnati, Ohio, U.S.
- Batted: Left Threw: Left

MLB debut
- August 17, 1877, for the Chicago White Stockings

Last MLB appearance
- October 1, 1885, for the Pittsburgh Alleghenys

MLB statistics
- Batting average: .261
- Home runs: 4
- Runs batted in: 77
- Stats at Baseball Reference

Teams
- Chicago White Stockings (1877); Cleveland Blues (1879); Pittsburgh Alleghenys (1884–1885)

Charles M. Eden (January 18, 1855 – September 17, 1920) was an outfielder in Major League Baseball. He played over parts of four seasons (1877, 1879, 1884–1885) for the Chicago White Stockings, Cleveland Blues, and Pittsburgh Alleghenys.

Eden announced his retirement from professional baseball following the 1885 season to work as a freight conductor for the Big Four railroad. He married Lydia G. Chambers in Allegheny City, Pennsylvania later that year.

== See also ==
- List of Major League Baseball annual doubles leaders
