= George Miller (baseball) =

American baseball player (1853–1929)

- Catcher
- Born: February 19, 1853; Newport, Kentucky, U.S.
- Died: July 24, 1929 (aged 76); Norwood, Ohio, U.S.
- Batted: Right Threw: Right

MLB debut
- September 6, 1877, for the Cincinnati Reds

Last MLB appearance
- July 22, 1884, for the Cincinnati Red Stockings

MLB statistics
- At bats: 57
- RBI: 6
- Home Runs: 0
- Batting average: .193
- Stats at Baseball Reference

Teams
- Cincinnati Reds (1877); Cincinnati Red Stockings (1884)

George C. Miller (February 19, 1853 – July 24, 1929) was an American professional baseball player who played catcher during the 1877 and 1884 baseball seasons.
