= Laurie Reis =

American baseball player (1858–1921)

- Pitcher
- Born: November 20, 1858; Chicago, Illinois, USA
- Died: January 24, 1921 (aged 62); Chicago, Illinois, USA
- Batted: Switch Threw: Right

MLB debut
- October 1, 1877, for the Chicago White Stockings

Last MLB appearance
- 1878, for the Chicago White Stockings

MLB statistics
- Win–loss record: 4-4
- Earned run average: 2.00
- Complete games: 8
- Stats at Baseball Reference

Teams
- Chicago White Stockings (1877–1878)

Lawrence P. "Laurie" Reis (November 20, 1858 in Chicago, Illinois – January 24, 1921 in Chicago, Illinois) was a 19th-century pitcher in Major League Baseball.

== Sources ==
- Career statistics from Baseball Reference, or Baseball Reference (Minors)
