= 23rd Street Grounds =

Baseball park in Chicago, Illinois, US

23rd Street Grounds State Street Grounds
- Interactive map of 23rd Street Grounds; State Street Grounds
- Location: Chicago, Illinois
- Coordinates: 41°51′11″N 87°37′42″W
- Surface: Grass

Construction
- Opened: 1872
- Closed: 1877

Tenant
- Chicago White Stockings

23rd Street Grounds, also known as State Street Grounds and 23rd Street Park, and sometimes spelled out as Twenty-third Street Grounds, was a ballpark in Chicago, in what is now the Chinatown district. In this ballpark, the Chicago White Stockings played baseball from 1874 to 1877, the first two years in the National Association and the latter two in the National League.

The 1871 Great Chicago Fire had put the original White Stockings club out of business, and its best players scattered to other National Association clubs. For 1872, the Chicago Base Ball Association was formed, with the intention of eventually fielding a new Chicago ball club, which it finally did in 1874. Until then, they staged some games figuring to get good attendance and some revenue. In early May, the organization built a new grounds "on 23rd Street near State Street", with the inaugural game coming on May 29, Baltimore defeating Cleveland 5–2. The land was owned by Charles Follansbee.

23rd Street hosted a total of eight National Association games during 1872–1873, along with other contests. The Cleveland and Troy clubs played two and four home games there, respectively, in 1872, when they were struggling economically (both eventually went out of business). The Boston Red Stockings played one in August of 1873 when they were flourishing. Their opponent was the Philadelphia club, and the two clubs played there again a few days later, swapping "home" and "visitor" roles.

== Location ==
The grounds occupied a city block well south and east of the 1871 fire's origin on DeKoven Street.

Several modern sources say it was bounded by 23rd Street, State Street, 22nd Street (now Cermak Road) and what is now Federal Street. This location is inconsistent with contemporary city directories and newspapers. The directories say:

- 1872: 23rd southwest corner of Burnside [an extension of Dearborn Street]
- 1873: not listed
- 1874: west side of State Street between 23rd and 24th
- 1875, 1876, 1877: west side of Dearborn Street between 23rd and 24th

Newspapers varied in naming the location as 23rd (usually spelled out as "Twenty-third") and State, 23rd "near" State or 23rd "west of" State. State was touted as the best thoroughfare to get to the park.

The Chicago Inter Ocean for April 20, 1872, p. 6, gave a few details about the ballpark, and specifically stated its location was to be "between Twenty-third and Twenty-fourth Streets, on Burnside Street, extending [west] to the track of the Michigan Southern Railroad."

The Chicago Tribune for May 5, 1872, p. 2, reported in some detail on the ballpark's construction:

- Bounded by 23rd north, Clark west, 24th south, Burnside east
- Butterfield [which eventually became Federal] did not go through
- Railroad tracks past the west line of fencing, close enough for fans sitting atop the cars to watch the game [tracks still exist; Clark does not go through]
- 600 feet north to south, 400 feet east to west
- Home plate about 125 feet from north line of fencing
- 100 yards along [right field] foul line to west end of fencing
- Batter facing southeasterly
- Open seating 200 feet on north end, another 200 feet on east side
- Covered grandstand in northwest corner
- Chicago Baseball Association clubhouse in southwest corner

No contemporary illustration of the ballpark is known to survive.

== Milestone games ==
The first game for the re-formed Chicago White Stockings came on May 13, 1874, with the locals defeating the Athletics (Philadelphia).

The first home game for the Chicago White Stockings in the newly formed National League came on May 10, 1876, with the locals defeating Cincinnati.

The final game played at this park was on Saturday, October 6, 1877. Chicago defeated Louisville 4–0 behind a shutout effort from hurler Laurie Reis. The final home run at the grounds was hit four days earlier by Lip Pike of Cincinnati.

== Finale ==
The ballpark was on a portion of what was called the Uhlich Tract, which was a 60-acre plot bounded by 22nd Street (north), State Street (east), 25th Street (south) and Wentworth Avenue (west). The ballpark's lot was available in part because there were various legal disputes over the ownership of the larger property. The only permanent building was the Uhlich House hotel on the southwest corner of 22nd and state.[Chicago Tribune, April 26, 1874, p. 5]

By 1875, the disputes had been resolved and the owners announced plans to develop the mostly-vacant area into residential properties.[Chicago Tribune, December 12, 1875, p. 6] Once the ball club's lease ran out, they went shopping for a new location, and secured a lease on the lakefront site which had been their home grounds for the ill-fated 1871 season.

Preceded by Union Base-Ball Grounds	Home of the Chicago White Stockings; 1874–1877	Succeeded by Lakefront Park
