= Harry Smith (infielder) =

American baseball player (1856–1898)

- Second baseman/Outfielder/Catcher
- Born: February 5, 1856; North Vernon, Indiana, U.S.
- Died: June 4, 1898 (aged 42); Queensville, Indiana, U.S.
- Batted: Right Threw: Right

MLB debut
- May 8, 1877, for the Chicago White Stockings

Last MLB appearance
- August 19, 1889, for the Louisville Colonels

MLB statistics
- Batting average: .220
- Home runs: 0
- Runs scored: 11
- Stats at Baseball Reference

Teams
- Chicago White Stockings (1877); Cincinnati Reds (1877); Louisville Colonels (1889)

Harry W. Smith (February 5, 1856 in North Vernon, Indiana – June 4, 1898 in Queensville, Indiana) was an American professional baseball player who was an infielder in the Major Leagues from 1877 to 1889. He played for the Chicago White Stockings, Cincinnati Reds, and Louisville Colonels.
