= Jack Gleason =

American baseball player (1854–1944)

- Third baseman
- Born: July 14, 1854; St. Louis, Missouri, US
- Died: September 4, 1944 (aged 90); St. Louis, Missouri, US
- Batted: Right Threw: Right

MLB debut
- October 2, 1877, for the St. Louis Brown Stockings

Last MLB appearance
- August 31, 1886, for the Philadelphia Athletics

MLB statistics
- Batting average: .269
- Home runs: 9
- Runs scored: 253
- Stats at Baseball Reference

Teams
- St. Louis Brown Stockings (1877); St. Louis Browns (1882–83); Louisville Eclipse (1883); St. Louis Maroons (1884–85); Philadelphia Athletics (1886)

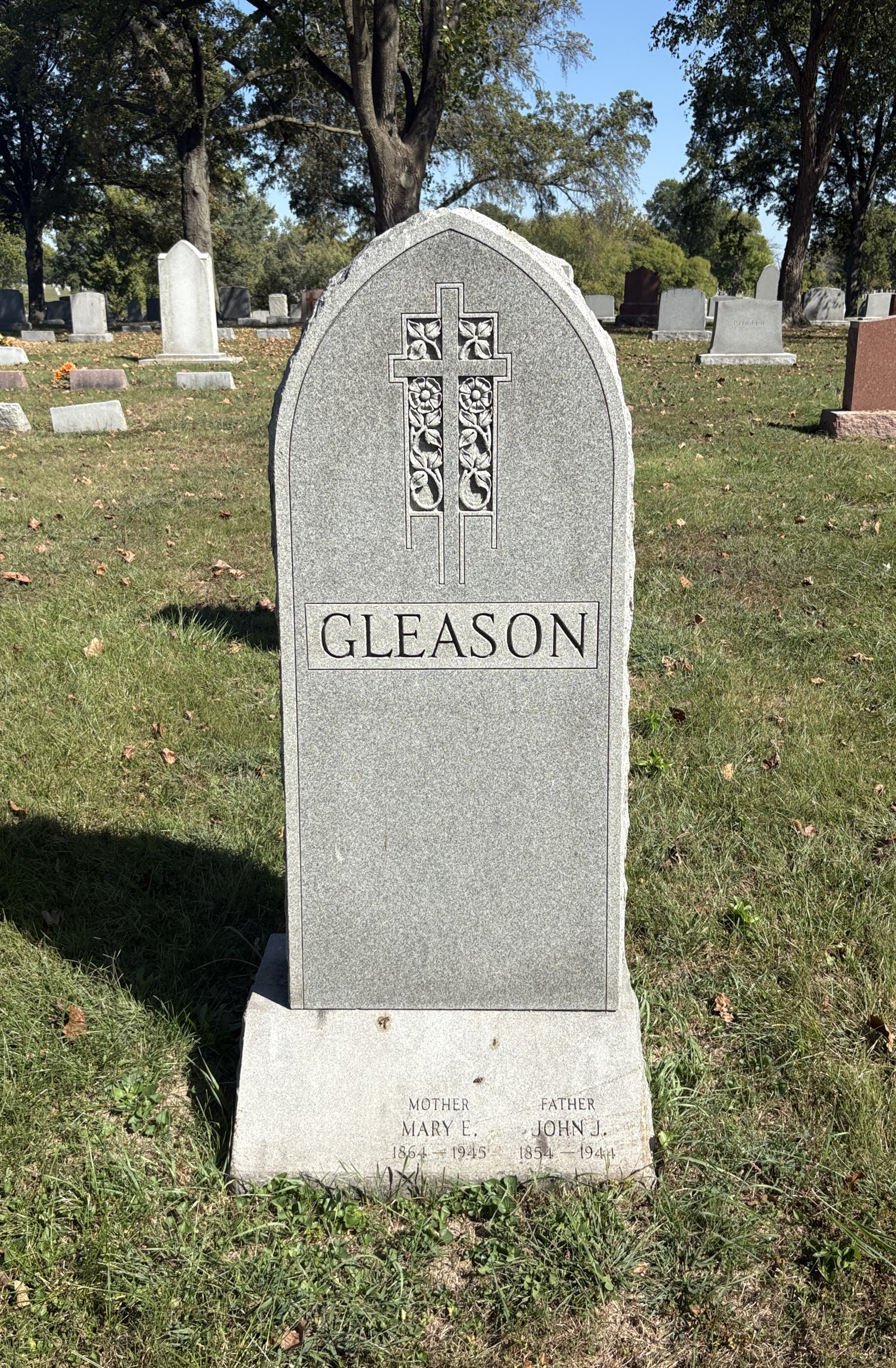
Gleason's grave at Calvary Cemetery

John Day Gleason (July 14, 1854 – September 4, 1944) was a 19th-century American professional baseball player who primarily played third base. His younger brother, Bill Gleason, was also a ballplayer.

Gleason appeared in one game for the St. Louis Brown Stockings of the National League in 1877, that team's last season. He then played in the American Association for the St. Louis Browns in 1882 and the beginning of 1883, and the Louisville Eclipse for most of 1883. From 1884 to 1885, Gleason played for the St. Louis Maroons during their only Union Association season and first in the National League. He played his last season in 1886 for the Philadelphia Athletics in the American Association. He later managed the San Francisco club in the Pacific Coast League in 1906, 1907 and 1909.

He died at his daughter's home in St. Louis on September 4, 1944, and was buried at Calvary Cemetery. He was the last living player from the 1877 season at his death.
