= Mike McGeary =

American baseball player (1850–1933)

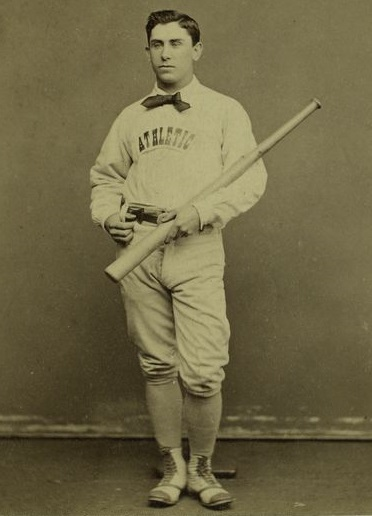
- Infielder
- Born: November 16, 1850; Philadelphia, Pennsylvania, U.S.
- Died: October 2, 1933 (aged 82); Philadelphia, Pennsylvania, U.S.
- Batted: Right Threw: Right

Major-league debut
- May 9, 1871, for the Troy Haymakers

Last major-league appearance
- June 26, 1882, for the Detroit Wolverines

Major-league statistics
- Batting average: .276
- Runs scored: 484
- Runs batted in: 236
- Stats at Baseball Reference

Teams
- National Association of Base Ball Players Troy Haymakers (1870) League Player Troy Haymakers (1871) Philadelphia Athletics (1872–1874) Philadelphia White Stockings (1875) St. Louis Brown Stockings (1876–1877) Providence Grays (1879–1880) Cleveland Blues (1880–1881) Detroit Wolverines (1882) League Manager Philadelphia White Stockings (1875) Providence Grays (1880) Cleveland Blues (1881)

Michael Henry McGeary (November 16, 1850 – October 2, 1933) was an American professional baseball player whose career spanned from 1871 to 1882. He played in 11 major-league seasons, playing principally as an infielder and catcher, for seven different major-league clubs: the Troy Haymakers (1870–1871), the Philadelphia Athletics (NA) (1872–1874), the Philadelphia White Stockings (1875), the St. Louis Brown Stockings (1876–1877), the Providence Grays (1879–1880), the Cleveland Blues (1880–1881) and the Detroit Wolverines (1882). Three of those clubs, the Philadelphia White Stockings, Providence Grays and Cleveland Blues, also employed him as player-manager.

In 11 major league seasons, McGeary compiled a .276 career batting average with 484 runs scored in 547 major league games. Rumors that he threw games persisted throughout his career, though such rumors were never proven.

== Early years ==
McGeary was born in Philadelphia on November 16, 1850. His parents, Michael and Ann McGeary (or McGary), were both immigrants from Ireland, and his father worked as a carpenter in Philadelphia. McGeary had two older brothers, John and James (both born in Ireland), and two younger sisters, Mary and Ellen (both born in Pennsylvania).

== Professional baseball ==
=== Troy Haymakers ===
McGeary began his baseball career in his home town of Philadelphia, playing for the "Experts" in 1868 and 1868. In 1870, he joined the Troy Haymakers. McGeary played in 37 of 46 games and was a little below average as a batter in the company of his teammates.

McGeary remained with the Haymakers in 1871 as the team participated in the first professional league. During the 1871 season, McGeary appeared in 29 games, 26 of them as a catcher and three as a shortstop. He compiled a .264 batting average, scored 42 runs in 29 games, and led the NABBP with 20 stolen bases.

=== Philadelphia Athletics/Whites ===
Over the next four years, McGeary played for the Philadelphia Athletics (1872–1874) and Philadelphia White Stockings (1875) of the National Association.

During the 1872 season, he split his time between the catcher and shortstop positions (23 games at each position), compiled a career high .360 batting average and scored 68 runs in 47 games. His Wins Above Replacement (WAR) rating of 1.9 in 1872 was the ninth highest among all position players in the National Association.

In 1873, McGeary was principally used as a shortstop, appearing in 43 games at that position and 14 as a catcher. He compiled a .302 batting average and scored 63 runs in 52 games.

In 1874, McGeary appeared in 28 games as a catcher, 24 as a shortstop, and four as an outfielder. He hit .323 and scored 61 runs in 54 games.

In 1875, McGeary became the player-manager of the Philadelphia Whites. He led the team to a 34–27 record, good for fifth place in the National Association. As a player, McGeary appeared in 27 games as a third baseman, 23 as a second baseman, 18 as a shortstop and three as an outfielder. He compiled a .290 batting average, stole 19 bases, and scored a career high 71 runs in 68 games.

=== Base running and strikeouts ===
In the early days of professional baseball, McGeary developed a reputation as one of the best base runners in the game. He led the NABBP in stolen bases in 1871 and was among the NABBP league leaders in the category four times from 1871 to 1875. His base running also contributed to his ability to score runs once he got on base. Between 1871 and 1875, he averaged more than a run per game every year and scored a total of 305 runs in 250 games. In 1916, McGeary claimed a record for having scored a run on a base hit with only three balls pitched. "He hit the first ball for a single, stole on the second pitch, and scored on an awkward infield hit on the third ball. Asked why the infielder did not throw home instead of to first Mike answered: 'Oh, we had boneheads in those days the same as you have them now.'"

In 1905, The Sporting Life wrote that McGeary was the best base-runner of his era: "The famous Mike McGeary in his day the best runner in the profession, and the Mike Kelly of that period, in point of base ball brains was the one player who regularly practiced sliding."

Between 1871 and 1876, McGeary also developed a reputation as one of the least likely batters to strikeout at the plate. During those six seasons, he struck out only six times in 1,518 plate appearances. He led his league in at bats per strikeout ratio on three occasions, with ratios of 275 in 1873, 310 in 1875, and 276 in 1876.

McGeary was one of the most prominent players in the early days of the game. An article published in 1884 cited him as one of the players who, along with Albert Spalding, Emil Gross, and Cap Anson, had grown rich off the game of baseball. The article noted that he "had made enough money out of base ball to build several houses in Philadelphia."

=== St. Louis Browns ===
In 1876, the National League was formed and replaced the NABBP. During the 1876 and 1877 seasons, McGeary played in the National League for the St. Louis Brown Stockings. During the 1876 season, he appeared in 61 games for St. Louis, 56 of them as a second baseman. He compiled a .261 batting average and scored 48 runs.

In 1877, McGeary appeared in 39 games at second base and 19 games at third base. He compiled a .252 average and scored 35 runs.

=== Accusations of game-fixing ===
Rumors that he threw games persisted throughout his career, though never substantiated. On June 24, 1875, Philadelphia lost a game in the 12th inning against the Chicago White Stockings. McGeary committed five errors in the game, and his Philadelphia teammates committed another 16 errors. A report was published that gamblers had paid $300 to $500 to members of the Philadelphia team to throw the game. On October 18, 1875, errors by McGeary were also cited as contributing to a Philadelphia loss in which heavy betting was placed on the opposing team.

After the formation of the National League in 1876, McGeary was the first league player to be accused of game-fixing. He was suspended but then reinstated after an investigation was unable to produce evidence. St. Louis management suspected him of "throwing" a game on May 27, 1876. The game took place against the New York Mutuals at the Union Grounds, and McGeary made four errors.

In 1888, The Sporting Life published a story suggesting that McGeary had used "a very peculiar yellow umbrella" to communicate with gamblers at the ball park. According to the story,

It was amusing and instructive to notice how often Mike raised his yellow parasol, and just as often lowered it. Indeed, he seemed to go through a regular drill with it ... Strange to say a few bad errors would invariably follow, and a number of runs would result to his club. Then Captain Mike would move over into another part of the stand where some one was offering a heavy bet that his club would not score a run in the next inning. A man following close to Mike would take the bet. In order to wipe the perspiration from his brow the yellow umbrella had to be lowered and while this work was being done, his men out on the field would become possessed, and fairly knock the ball out of the enclosure. That old yellow umbrella was worth more to McGeary in those days than any old pair of shoes or gloves in those days of the $2,000 limit rule.

=== Providence Grays ===
After spending the 1878 seasons playing for Springfield in the International Association, McGeary returned to the National League in 1879 with the Providence Grays and served as a player-manager for a portion of the following season. He led the Grays to an 8–7 record in his brief turn as manager, and appeared in 85 games as a player (73 games at second base, 12 at third base). He compiled a .275 batting average and scored 62 runs. During the 1879 season, McGearly also led the National League with 62 errors in 73 games at second base.

McGeary returned to Providence at the start of the 1880 season as a player only. He appeared in 18 games and compiled a .186 batting average before being dealt to the Cleveland Blues.

=== Cleveland Blues ===
McGeary joined the Cleveland Blues during the 1880 season and remained with the team through the 1881 season. He served as a player-manager for a brief time during the 1880 season and compiled a 4–7 record. He appeared in a total of 42 games for Cleveland, 40 of them at third base and two in the outfield, and compiled a .243 batting average.

=== Detroit Wolverines ===
McGeary signed with the Detroit Wolverines of the National League for the 1882 season. He appeared in 34 games for the Wolverines, 33 at shortstop and three at second base. He compiled a .143 batting average for Detroit, appeared in his last major league game on June 26, 1882 (at age 31), and was released the next day.

== Later years ==
Little is known about McGeary after his baseball career, and he has been included in Peter Morris's "Cold Cases of the Diamond."

From at least 1890 to 1908, McGeary appears to have been employed as a clerk, laborer or caulker, and living in Philadelphia.

At the time of the 1910 United States census, McGeary was living as a lodger at 98 West 102nd Street in Manhattan and listed his occupation as a builder of houses.

McGeary died on October 2, 1933, in Philadelphia.

Preceded by Bill Craver	Philadelphia White Stockings Managers; 1875	Succeeded by Bob Addy
Preceded by George Wright	Providence Grays Managers; 1880	Succeeded by John Montgomery Ward
Preceded by Jim McCormick	Cleveland Blues Managers; 1881	Succeeded by John Clapp
