= Leonidas Lee =

American baseball player (1860–1912)

- Outfielder
- Born: December 13, 1860; St. Louis, Missouri
- Died: June 11, 1912 (aged 51); Hendersonville, North Carolina
- Batted: Unknown Threw: Unknown

MLB debut
- July 17, 1877, for the St. Louis Brown Stockings

Last MLB appearance
- August 25, 1877, for the St. Louis Brown Stockings

MLB statistics
- Games played: 4
- Hits: 5
- Batting average: .278
- Stats at Baseball Reference

Teams
- St. Louis Brown Stockings (1877)

Leonidas Pyrrhus Lee, born as Leonidas Pyrrhus Funkhouser (December 13, 1860 – June 11, 1912) was an American professional player who played one season in Major League Baseball as an outfielder for the 1877 St. Louis Brown Stockings. He made his major league debut for the Brown Stockings on July 17, 1877, and in four games with the club, he collected five hits, including a double, in 18 at bats for a .278 batting average. His father, Robert Funkhouser, was a successful St. Louis businessman. A graduate of Princeton University, Lee played on both the school's baseball and football team. He later became a doctor. Lee died at the age of 51 in Hendersonville, North Carolina of Myocarditis, and is interred at Rosehill Cemetery in Chicago, Illinois.
