= T. E. Newell =

American baseball player (1855–1936)

- Shortstop
- Born: January 5, 1855; St. Louis, Missouri
- Died: March 19, 1936 (aged 81); El Paso, Texas
- Batted: Unknown Threw: Unknown

MLB debut
- August 8, 1877, for the St. Louis Brown Stockings

Last MLB appearance
- August 8, 1877, for the St. Louis Brown Stockings

MLB statistics
- Games played: 1
- At bats: 3
- Hits: 0
- Stats at Baseball Reference

Teams
- St. Louis Brown Stockings (1877)

T. E. Newell (January 5, 1855 – March 19, 1936), born as George Washington Newell, was an American Major League Baseball player who played shortstop in one game for the 1877 St. Louis Brown Stockings of the National League. He was hitless in three at bats in the game.

Initially listed as "T.E. Newell", confirmation of his true identity was found in 2014.
