= Patrick McKenna (baseball) =

American baseball player (1854–1922)

- Center fielder
- Born: December 27, 1854; St. Louis, Missouri
- Died: October 27, 1922 (aged 67); St. Louis, Missouri
- Batted: Unknown Threw: Unknown

MLB debut
- 1877, for the St. Louis Brown Stockings

Last MLB appearance
- 1877, for the St. Louis Brown Stockings

MLB statistics
- Games played: 1
- At bats: 5
- Hits: 1
- Stats at Baseball Reference

Teams
- St. Louis Brown Stockings (1877)

Patrick J. McKenna (1854-1922) was a Major League Baseball center fielder who played in one game for the St. Louis Brown Stockings in 1877.

McKenna died in 1922 in his home town of St Louis, Missouri of a cerebral hemorrhage.
