= Bobby Mitchell (pitcher) =

American baseball player (1856–1933)

- Pitcher
- Born: February 6, 1856; Cincinnati, Ohio, U.S.
- Died: May 1, 1933 (aged 77); Springfield, Ohio, U.S.
- Batted: Left Threw: Left

MLB debut
- September 6, 1877, for the Cincinnati Reds

Last MLB appearance
- August 19, 1882, for the St. Louis Brown Stockings

MLB statistics
- Win–loss record: 20–23
- Earned run average: 3.18
- Strikeouts: 184
- Stats at Baseball Reference

Teams
- Cincinnati Reds (1877–1878); Cleveland Blues (1879); St. Louis Brown Stockings (1882)

Robert McKasha Mitchell (February 6, 1856 – May 1, 1933) was an American professional baseball pitcher during the 19th century. Mitchell played for the Cincinnati Reds, Cleveland Blues, and St. Louis Brown Stockings. He started 44 games during the four seasons of his career, completing 40 of his starts and winning 20 games.
