= Tommy Bond (baseball) =

Irish baseball player (1856–1941)

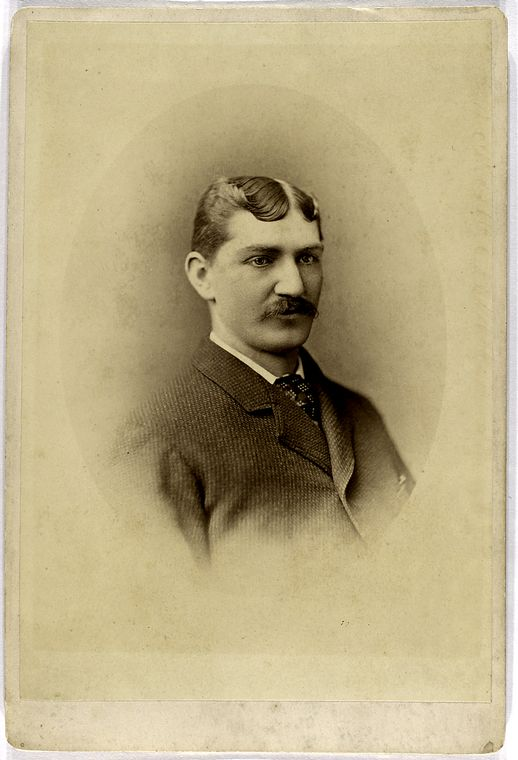
- Bond c. 1877–1881
- Pitcher / Right fielder
- Born: April 2, 1856; Granard, Ireland
- Died: January 24, 1941 (aged 84); Boston, Massachusetts, U.S.
- Batted: Right Threw: Right

MLB debut
- May 5, 1874, for the Brooklyn Atlantics

Last MLB appearance
- August 11, 1884, for the Indianapolis Hoosiers

MLB statistics
- Win–loss record: 234–163
- Earned run average: 2.14
- Strikeouts: 972
- Stats at Baseball Reference

Teams
- As player: Brooklyn Atlantics (1874); Hartford Dark Blues (1875–1876); Boston Red Caps (1877–1881); Worcester Ruby Legs (1882); Boston Reds (1884); Indianapolis Hoosiers (1884); As manager: Worcester Ruby Legs (1882)

Career highlights and awards
- Triple Crown (1877); 2× NL wins leader (1877, 1878); 2× NL ERA leader (1877, 1879); 2× NL strikeout leader (1877, 1878)

Thomas Henry Bond (April 2, 1856 – January 24, 1941) was an Irish-born Major League Baseball player who was a pitcher and a right fielder for a total of ten seasons. A native of Granard, Ireland, he is the first man born in Ireland to play Major League Baseball. Bond was also the last survivor of the National League's first season (1876).

== Early life ==
Tommy Bond was born on April 2, 1856, in Granard, Ireland, to an English father and Irish mother. The family migrated to Brooklyn, New York, in 1862, and Tommy played amateur and semiprofessional baseball there in the early 1870s.

== Career ==
Bond played for six teams during his career: the Brooklyn Atlantics (1874), Hartford Dark Blues (1875–1876), Boston Red Caps (1877–1881), Worcester Ruby Legs (1882), Boston Reds (1884), and Indianapolis Hoosiers (1884). He also managed the Worcester team for six games.

On October 20 of his rookie year, he fell one out short of what would have been major league baseball's first no-hitter. Two years later, he was the losing pitcher in the first successful no-hitter, hurled by George Bradley on July 15, 1876.

During his 10-season career, he was a three-time 40-game winner, played for two National League pennant-winning clubs, and regularly finished in the top ten in many pitching categories. In 1877, he was the first winner of baseball's pitching Triple Crown, leading the NL in wins (40), earned run average (2.11), and strikeouts (170). His career statistics include a record of 234–163, 386 complete games in 408 starts, 42 shutouts, and an ERA of 2.31. Bond also played 92 games in the outfield, a few more in the infield, and batted .238 with 174 RBI and 213 runs scored. Bond currently holds the third-best strikeouts per walks rate in baseball history, at a 5.0363 ratio, for pitchers who threw a minimum 1,000 innings. Bond previously held the record for over 130 years, and as of 2026 still holds the record for retired pitchers.

Bond threw a fastball, curveball, and by the end of his career a spitball.

== Later life and death ==
Bond married his wife, Louise, in 1879, and they had three children.

After retirement from pro baseball, Bond worked stints as an umpire in the National League, minor leagues, and college games. He also worked in his wife's family leather business and then for the city of Boston for decades.

Bond received a single Hall of Fame vote from the Veterans Committee's 1936 ballot.

Bond died the age of 84 in 1941 in Boston, Massachusetts, and is interred at Forest Hills Cemetery.

At the time of his death he had been the last living player from the 1878 season.

== Honors ==
In the Irish Baseball League, the annual award for the best pitcher is named "The 'Tommy Bond' Best Pitcher Award".

== See also ==
- Major League Baseball Triple Crown
- List of Major League Baseball career wins leaders
- List of Major League Baseball annual ERA leaders
- List of Major League Baseball annual strikeout leaders
- List of Major League Baseball annual wins leaders
- List of Major League Baseball player-managers
- List of players from Ireland in Major League Baseball

Preceded by First Triple Crown Winner	National League Pitching Triple Crown; 1877	Succeeded by Charlie Radbourn
