= Bob Addy =

Canadian baseball player and manager (1842–1910)

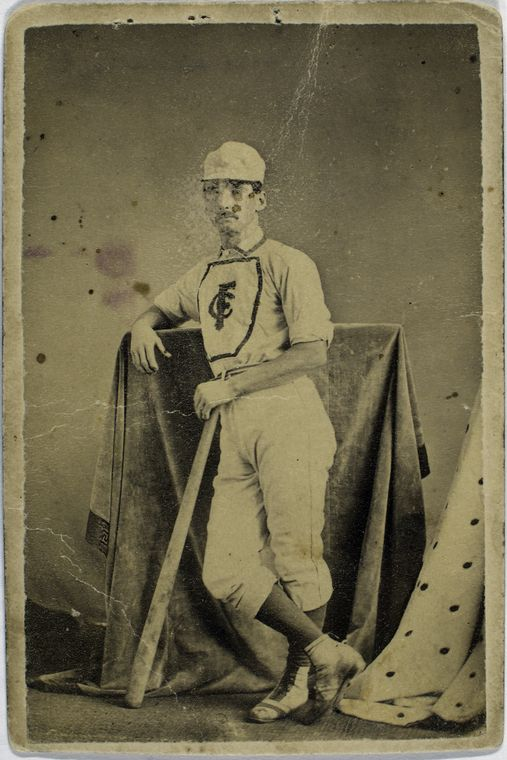
- Right fielder / Second baseman
- Born: February 1842; Port Hope, Canada West
- Died: April 9, 1910 (aged 68); Pocatello, Idaho, U.S.
- Batted: Left Threw: Left

Major league debut
- May 6, 1871, for the Rockford Forest Citys

Last major league appearance
- October 8, 1877, for the Cincinnati Reds

Major league statistics
- Batting average: .277
- Home runs: 1
- Runs batted in: 167
- Stats at Baseball Reference

Teams
- National Association of Base Ball Players Rockford Forest Citys (1866–1870) League Player Rockford Forest Citys (1871) Philadelphia White Stockings (1873, 1875) Boston Red Stockings (1873) Hartford Dark Blues (1874) Chicago White Stockings (1876) Cincinnati Reds (1877) League Manager Philadelphia White Stockings (1875) Cincinnati Reds (1877)

Member of the Canadian

Baseball Hall of Fame
- Induction: 2021

Robert Edward Addy (February 1842 – April 9, 1910), nicknamed "the Magnet", was an amateur and professional baseball player who was the first Canadian player, manager, and umpire in major league baseball. (Note: Addy first played in the major leagues in 1871, with the Rockford Forest Citys of the National Association—the status of the National Association as a major league has been a point of some disagreement among baseball historians.) Playing mostly right field and second base, Addy's professional career spanned from 1871 in the National Association to 1877 in the National League. He was often credited as the first player to introduce the slide in an organized game, but this is doubted by modern historians.

== Career ==
Bob Addy was born on February 1842 in Port Hope, located in what is now Ontario. Historically, he was credited with employing the first slide in an organized baseball game while playing for the 1866 Rockford Forest Citys, but historians consider him to most likely be simply an early popularizer of the tactic. Addy continued to play with the Forest Citys through 1871, and became the first Canadian player in the major leagues when Rockford joined the first all-professional league, the National Association.

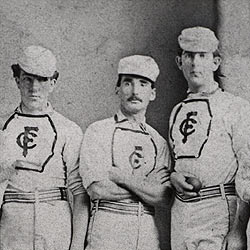
Bob Addy (center) in 1869

Rockford lasted just the one season in the Association, and Addy did not rejoin the league until 1873 when he joined the Philadelphia White Stockings. He played in ten games as player-manager, before moving on and joining the Boston Red Stockings later in the season. He helped the Red Stockings win the league title that year, playing in right field, hitting .355, and finished ninth in the league with a .354 on-base percentage. On January 20, 1874, the National Association's Judiciary Committee met to discuss, among other things, charges that Addy had joined the Boston Red Stockings before 60 days had elapsed since leaving the Philadelphia club. He was acquitted of the charge and was allowed to play.

He did not play for the Red Stockings in 1874, as he signed to play for the Hartford Dark Blues, but his batting declined to .239, and his on-base percentage dropped to .243. For the 1875 season, he re-joined the Philadelphia White Stockings, playing in a career high 69 games. He batted .258, and finished ninth in the league with 16 stolen bases. For one game in October 1875, Addy was used as a National Association umpire, most likely because he was one of the few people in town who could do the job. In doing so, he became the first Canadian umpire in the majors.

At season's end, the Association folded and was replaced by the National League, and Addy joined the Chicago White Stockings. Chicago won the league title that season, with Addy playing 32 games and hitting .282. Addy moved to his second Major League team in two years, and sixth team in seven years, when he joined the Cincinnati Reds, playing every day in right field, and later took over as the team's manager after Lip Pike quit the position.

== Post-career ==
In his autobiography, Cap Anson described Addy's playing style, writing, "Bob Addy, who was one of the best of the lot, was a good, hard hustling player, a good base runner and a hard hitter. He was as honest as the day is long... He was an odd sort of a genius and quit the game because he thought he could do better at something else."

Addy later made an unsuccessful attempt to popularize baseball played on ice. He died at the age of 68 in Pocatello, Idaho, and is interred at Mountain View Cemetery.

== See also ==
- List of countries with their first Major League Baseball player
- List of Major League Baseball player–managers

== Notes ==
Preceded by Mike McGeary	Philadelphia White Stockings Managers; 1875	Succeeded by League folded
Preceded by Lip Pike	Cincinnati Reds (1876–1880) Managers; 1877	Succeeded by Jack Manning
