= Terry Larkin =

American baseball player (1856–1894)

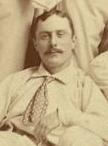
- Pitcher
- Born: 1856; Brooklyn, New York, U.S.
- Died: September 16, 1894; Brooklyn, New York, U.S.
- Batted: Right Threw: Right

MLB debut
- May 20, 1876, for the New York Mutuals

Last MLB appearance
- October 13, 1884, for the Richmond Virginians

MLB statistics
- Win–loss record: 89–80
- Earned run average: 2.43
- Strikeouts: 406
- Stats at Baseball Reference

Teams
- New York Mutuals (1876); Hartford Dark Blues (1877); Chicago White Stockings (1878–1879); Troy Trojans (1880); Richmond Virginians (1884)

Frank S. "Terry" Larkin (1856 – September 16, 1894) was a Major League Baseball pitcher who played for five teams during a six-season career.

During the early 1880s, Larkin had been repeatedly arrested for incidents of violence against his wife and his father, and for shooting at police officers. He had also survived two suicide attempts connected to these incidents. He was later institutionalized after challenging a former employer to a duel with pistols. In 1894, while apparently still hospitalized, he died in a new attempt at suicide.

== Career ==
Larkin, a right-hander, debuted on May 20, 1876 for the New York Mutuals, pitching a complete game in his only appearance of the season. He pitched in 1877 for the Hartford Dark Blues, posting a 29–25 record while pitching 501 innings. He then moved to the Chicago White Stockings for the 1878 and 1879 seasons, going 29–26 in 1878 and 31–23 in 1879, pitching over 500 innings each season. Larkin was a good hitter for a pitcher and finished 8th in the National League with 32 runs batted in (RBI), while hitting for a .288 average in 1878.

== Post-career ==
In April 1883, Larkin was arrested and hospitalized after shooting his wife, shooting at the responding police officers and then attempting to cut his own throat with a razor. The following month, while still hospitalized, he attempted to kill himself again. He blamed his condition on having "been a sufferer for a long time with malaria." In August of that year, he was sent to prison for six months after being accused of beating his wife. After his release from prison, his father took him into his home. Within a week of his release, Larkin was arrested for pulling his father out of bed at 3:00 in the morning, pulling a gun on him and threatening to shoot him.

Larkin was later institutionalized after challenging his former employer to a duel with pistols, and while apparently still hospitalized committed suicide by slitting his throat with a razor on September 16, 1894 in Brooklyn, New York. He is interred at Calvary Cemetery in Woodside, New York.
