= Jack Manning (baseball) =

American baseball player (1853–1929)

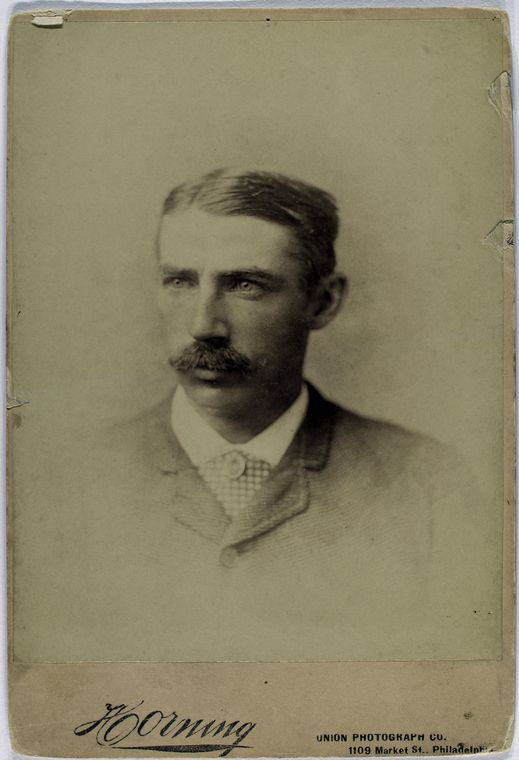
- Right fielder / Pitcher
- Born: December 20, 1853; Braintree, Massachusetts, U.S.
- Died: August 15, 1929 (aged 75); Boston, Massachusetts, U.S.
- Batted: Right Threw: Right

MLB debut
- April 23, 1873, for the Boston Red Stockings

Last MLB appearance
- October 14, 1886, for the Baltimore Orioles

MLB statistics
- Games played: 833
- Batting average: .263
- Runs batted in: 360
- Win–loss record: 39–27
- Earned run average: 2.79
- Stats at Baseball Reference

Teams
- As player: Boston Red Stockings (1873); Baltimore Canaries (1874); Hartford Dark Blues (1874); Boston Red Stockings / Boston Red Caps (1875–1876); Cincinnati Reds (1877); Boston Red Caps (1878); Cincinnati Stars (1880); Buffalo Bisons (1881); Philadelphia Quakers (1883–1885); Baltimore Orioles (1886); As manager: Cincinnati Reds (1877)

Career highlights and awards
- On October 9, 1884, he hit 3 home runs in one game.

John E. Manning (December 20, 1853 – August 15, 1929) was an American Major League Baseball player. Born in Braintree, Massachusetts, United States, he broke into the National Association in 1873 at the age of 19. His career covered 12 seasons, eight teams, and three leagues. He was a primarily a right fielder who also played many games as a pitcher, and would play the infield positions on occasion as well.

On August 3, 1876, he became the first pitcher to hit a home run.

On October 9, 1884, when his Philadelphia Quakers ballclub were visiting the Chicago White Stockings in Lakeshore Park, he hit three home runs in the same game, becoming the third player to do so. The first occasions were done by Ned Williamson and Cap Anson. All three had their big game in that hitter-friendly park in 1884.

Manning died in Boston, Massachusetts, and was interred at New Calvary Cemetery in Boston.

== See also ==
- List of Major League Baseball annual saves leaders
- List of Major League Baseball player-managers

Preceded by Bob Addy	Cincinnati Reds (1876–1880) Managers; 1877	Succeeded by Cal McVey
