= Joe Battin =

American baseball player (1853–1937)

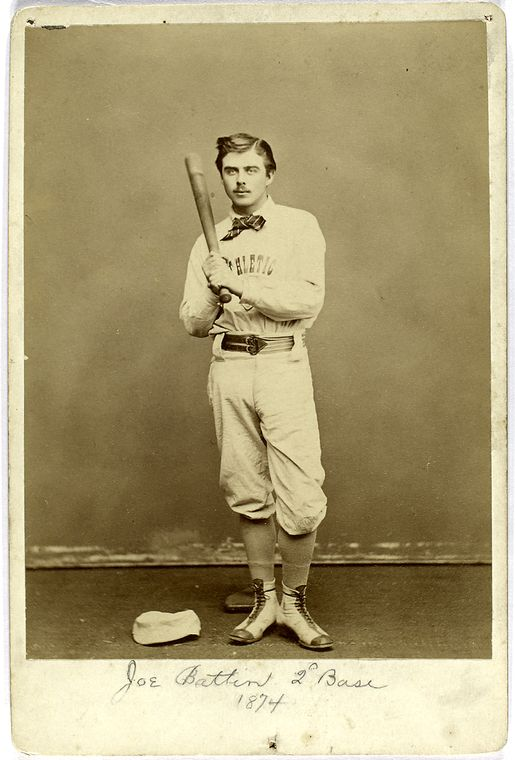
- Second baseman / Third baseman / Manager
- Born: November 11, 1853; Philadelphia, Pennsylvania, U.S.
- Died: December 10, 1937 (aged 84); Akron, Ohio, U.S.
- Batted: Right Threw: Right

MLB debut
- August 11, 1871, for the Cleveland Forest Citys

Last MLB appearance
- May 28, 1890, for the Syracuse Stars

MLB statistics
- Batting average: .225
- Home runs: 3
- Runs batted in: 143
- Stats at Baseball Reference
- Managerial record at Baseball Reference

Teams
- As player: Cleveland Forest Citys (1871); Philadelphia Athletics (1873–1874); St. Louis Brown Stockings (1875–1877); Pittsburgh Alleghenys (1882–1884); Chicago Browns/Pittsburgh Stogies (1884); Baltimore Monumentals (1884); Syracuse Stars (1890); As manager: Pittsburgh Alleghenys (1883–1884); Chicago Browns/Pittsburgh Stogies (1884)

Joseph V. Battin (November 11, 1853 – December 10, 1937) was a 19th-century American Major League Baseball player. He was born in Philadelphia, Pennsylvania.

Battin played major league baseball from 1871 to 1884 and then returned for one season in 1890, after several years in various minor leagues. Battin primarily played at second base and third base, although he occasionally filled in at other roles as well.

His best year was in 1876 for the St. Louis Brown Stockings, when he batted .300 and scored 34 runs.

Battin briefly served as manager for two different teams; the Pittsburgh Alleghenys of the American Association in 1883 (2–11 record) and 1884 (6–7 record), and the Chicago Browns/Pittsburgh Stogies of the Union Association in 1884 (1–5 record).

In 1936, the National Baseball Hall of Fame and Museum listed Battin on the ballot. He received one vote.

Battin died at the age of 84 in Akron, Ohio, where he was buried at the Glendale Cemetery.

== See also ==
- List of Major League Baseball player–managers
