= Amos Booth =

American baseball player (1848–1921)

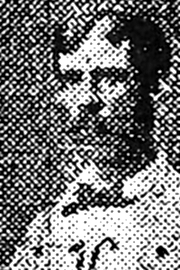
- Catcher/Infielder
- Born: September 4, 1848; Lebanon, Ohio, U.S.
- Died: July 1, 1921 (aged 72); Miamisburg, Ohio, U.S.
- Batted: Right Threw: Right

MLB debut
- April 25, 1876, for the Cincinnati Reds

Last MLB appearance
- September 28, 1882, for the Louisville Eclipse

MLB statistics
- Batting average: .224
- Home runs: 0
- Runs batted in: 27
- Earned run average: 4.14
- Stats at Baseball Reference

Teams
- Cincinnati Reds (1876–1877); Cincinnati Stars (1880); Baltimore Orioles (1882); Louisville Eclipse (1882)

Amos Smith Booth (September 4, 1848 – July 1, 1921), nicknamed "Darling", was an American professional baseball player in the 1870s and 1880s. Booth's primary playing years were in 1876 and 1877 with the Cincinnati Reds. He had a .261 batting average his first year, and a .171 in 1877. Booth took a leave of absence from baseball until 1880 when he appeared in one game with his old team. He also played in two games in 1882, with the Baltimore Orioles and Louisville Eclipse.

== Sources ==
- Career statistics from MLB · Baseball Reference · Baseball Reference (Minors) · Retrosheet · Baseball Almanac
