= Harry Little (baseball) =

American baseball player (1850–1927)

- Outfielder
- Born: November 9, 1850; Pocahontas, Missouri, U.S.
- Died: February 17, 1927 (aged 76); Bremen Township, Illinois, U.S.
- Batted: Unknown Threw: Right

MLB debut
- July 16, 1877, for the St. Louis Brown Stockings

Last MLB appearance
- 1877, for the Louisville Grays

MLB statistics
- Batting average: .133
- Home runs: 0
- Runs batted in: 0
- Stats at Baseball Reference

Teams
- St. Louis Brown Stockings (1877); Louisville Grays (1877)

Harry Alexander Little (November 9, 1850 – February 17, 1927) was an American Major League Baseball player who played mainly outfield in 1877 for the St. Louis Brown Stockings and Louisville Grays.
