= Lip Pike =

American baseball player and manager (1845–1893)

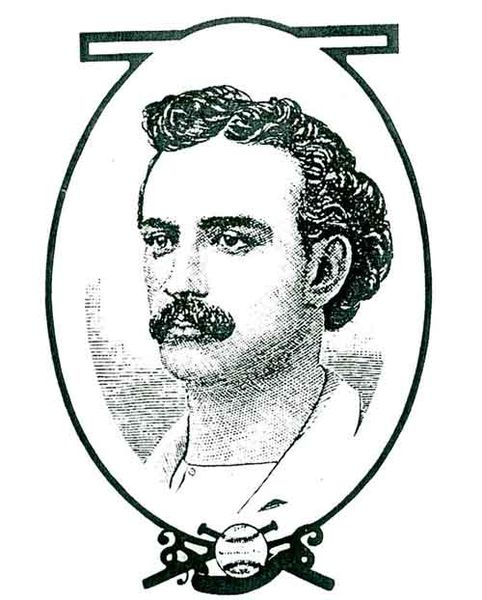
- Outfielder
- Born: May 25, 1845; New York City, U.S.
- Died: October 10, 1893 (aged 48); Brooklyn, New York, U.S.
- Batted: Left Threw: Left

Major league debut
- May 9, 1871, for the Troy Haymakers

Last major league appearance
- July 28, 1887, for the New York Metropolitans

Major league statistics
- Batting average: .322
- Home runs: 21
- Runs batted in: 332
- Stats at Baseball Reference

Teams
- National Association of Base Ball Players Brooklyn Atlantics (1865) Philadelphia Athletics (1866) Irvington of Irvington, New Jersey (1867) New York Mutuals (1867–1868) Brooklyn Atlantics (1869–1870) League player Troy Haymakers (1871) Baltimore Canaries (1872–1873) Hartford Dark Blues (1874) St. Louis Brown Stockings (NA) (1875) St. Louis Brown Stockings (NL) (1876) Cincinnati Reds (1877–1878) Providence Grays (1878) Worcester Worcesters (1881) New York Metropolitans (1887) League manager Troy Haymakers (1871) Hartford Dark Blues (1874) Cincinnati Reds (1877)

Career highlights and awards
- 3× NA home run leader (1871–1873); 1× NL home run leader (1877); NA RBI leader (1872); NA doubles leader (1874)

Lipman Emanuel "Lip" Pike (May 25, 1845 – October 10, 1893), nicknamed "the Iron Batter", was an American star of 19th-century baseball in the United States. His brother, Israel Pike, played briefly for the Hartford Dark Blues during the 1877 season.

Pike was one of professional baseball's first great sluggers, leading early professional leagues in home runs four times. Pike possessed "great speed, a powerful, if erratic, throwing arm, and enormous power."

Pike was also the first Jewish baseball star and manager in America.

== Early and personal life ==
Pike was Jewish and was born in New York into a Jewish Dutch family, and grew up in Brooklyn. His father Emanuel was a haberdasher. His mother was Jane, his brothers were Boaz, Israel, and Jacob, and he had a sister Julia. His family moved to Brooklyn when he was very young. Several of Pike's ancestors were Jewish rabbis who emigrated from Portugal to the Netherlands.

== Baseball career ==
Pike began in baseball when he was 13. Pike first rose to prominence playing for the Philadelphia Athletics, whom he joined in 1866. He brought an impressive blend of power and speed to the team, hitting many home runs as well as being one of the fastest players around. On one occasion he hit five home runs in one game.

However, it was soon brought to light that he and two other Philadelphia players were being given $20 ($440 in current dollar terms) a week to play. Since all baseball players were ostensibly amateurs (though many were, like Pike, accepting money under the table), a hearing was set up by the sport's governing body, the National Association of Base Ball Players. In the end, no one showed up to the hearing, and the matter was dropped. By 1869, the Cincinnati Red Stockings became the first openly professional team, and Pike's hearing, farcical as it seems to have been, paved the way for Harry Wright's professionalization of baseball. The Athletics were very successful, but Pike was dropped from the team in 1867, because he was from New York, and thus a 'foreigner,' calling his loyalty into question.

He moved on to the Irvington, New Jersey club and later in 1867 to the New York Mutuals, always a leading team, where he returned for 1868, having caught the eye of Boss Tweed. In 1869 he moved to the Brooklyn Atlantics, another perennial leader, where he hit .610. In 1870, the Atlantics, with Pike manning second base, finally ended Cincinnati's 93-game winning streak.

=== National Association ===
In 1871, the National Association was formed as the first professional baseball league, and Pike joined the Troy Haymakers for its inaugural season. He was their star and for 4 games was the captain and manager, batting .377 (6th best in the league) and hitting a league-leading 4 home runs. He also led the league in extra base hits (21), and was 2nd in slugging percentage (.654) and doubles (10), 4th in RBIs (39), 5th in triples (7), 6th in on-base percentage (.400), 9th in hits (49), and 10th in runs (43). The Haymakers only finished 6th, though, and the team's captaincy switched to Bill Craver.

The Haymakers revamped their roster for the 1872 season, and Pike headed for Baltimore, where he played for the Baltimore Canaries. Pike had another excellent season, leading the league in home runs again (with 6), RBIs (60), and games (56), and coming in 2nd in total bases (127) and extra base hits (26), 3rd in at bats (288), 5th in doubles (15) and triples (5), 9th in slugging percentage (.441) and stolen bases (8), and 10th in hits (84).

In 1873, Pike led the league in home runs for the 3rd consecutive season, hitting 4, and was 2nd in triples (8), 4th in total bases (132), stolen bases (8), and extra base hits (26), 7th in slugging percentage (.462), 8th in doubles (14), RBIs (50), and at bats (286), 9th in hits (90), and 10th in games (56).

Pike was also one of the fastest players in the league. He would occasionally race any challenger for a cash prize, routinely coming out the winner. On August 16, 1873, he raced a fast trotting horse named "Clarence" in a 100-yard sprint at Baltimore's Newington Park, and won by four yards with a time of 10 seconds flat, earning $250 ($6,700 today).

Baltimore went bankrupt after the season, so Pike headed off to captain the Hartford Dark Blues for the 1874 season. The Dark Blues were a poor team, but Pike had another fine season, slugging .574 to lead the league, and coming in 2nd with an on-base percentage of .368.

Pike abandoned the weak Hartford team after a single season, switching to the St. Louis Brown Stockings. For the first time in his professional career, Pike failed to hit a home run, although he stole 25 bases. He also hit 12 triples and 22 doubles (leading the league) in what was probably his finest offensive season.

In all, Lip Pike has the National Association career home run (15) and extra base hits (135) records.

=== National League ===
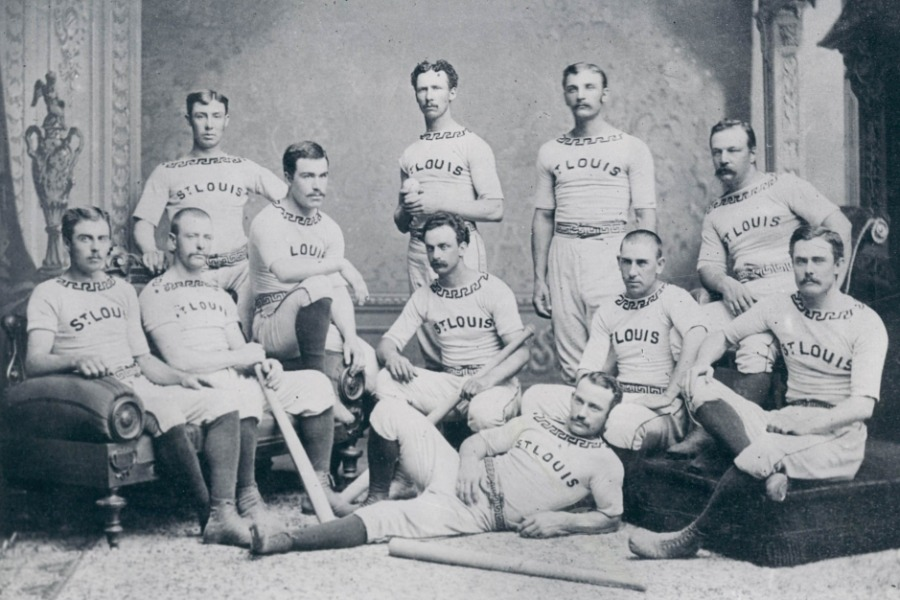
1876 St. Louis Brown Stockings, with Lip Pike in the second row, 4th from the left

In 1876, when the National League replaced the National Association, Pike stuck with St. Louis. The Brown Stockings turned in a very good season, finishing a solid 2nd to the Chicago White Stockings. Pike continued to produce offensively, notching totals of 133 total bases (5th in the league) and 34 extra-base hits (2nd).

Seemingly never content to stay with a team very long, Pike headed to the Cincinnati Reds for the 1877 season. The Reds finished last. Pike was still a top-quality player, leading the league in home runs for the 4th time in the 1870s. However, age was starting to catch up with the 32-year-old Pike. He began the season as the 8th-oldest player in the league, and was the 4th-oldest player of the 1878 season. The 1878 Reds played very well, though. They finished 2nd, but Pike was replaced by Buttercup Dickerson halfway through the season and forced to look elsewhere for a team. He ended up playing a few games for the Providence Grays, and spent the next two years playing for minor league teams.

Sporting Life subsequently named him an outfielder on its 1870–1880 All-Star team.

Pike got a brief call-up in 1881 to play for the Worcester Worcesters, but the 36-year-old Pike could no longer play effectively, hitting .111 and not managing a single extra base hit in 18 at-bats over 5 games. His play was so poor as to arouse suspicions, and Pike found himself banned from the National League that September. He was added to the National League blacklist in 1881. He turned to haberdashery, the vocation of his father, and spent another 6 years playing only amateur baseball. He was reinstated in 1883.

=== American Association ===
In 1887, the New York Metropolitans of the American Association gave Pike another chance. At 42, he was the oldest player in baseball. The only game he played was more of a sending off than a new start, though, and Pike headed back to his haberdashery once more.

== Death ==
Pike died unexpectedly of heart disease at the age of 48 in 1893. The Brooklyn Eagle reported that "Many wealthy Hebrews and men high in political and old time baseball circles attended the funeral service." He was interred in the Salem Fields Cemetery in Brooklyn, New York.

== Legacy ==
In 1936, decades after he died, Pike received one vote in the veterans election for the 1936 Baseball Hall of Fame balloting. He was not included on any further ballots.

Pike was inducted into the International Jewish Sports Hall of Fame in 1985.

Pike was inducted into the New York State Baseball Hall of Fame in the Class of 2016.

Pike was inducted into the National Jewish Sports Hall of Fame in 2024.

Pike was the first Jewish manager in major league history and one of only seven all-time.

== See also ==
- Major League Baseball titles leaders
- List of Jewish Major League Baseball players
- List of Major League Baseball annual home run leaders
- List of Major League Baseball annual runs batted in leaders
- List of Major League Baseball annual doubles leaders
- List of Major League Baseball player-managers

Records
Preceded by none	Career home run record holder shared with Levi Meyerle & Fred Treacey; 1871	Succeeded by self
Preceded by shared with Levi Meyerle & Fred Treacey	Career home run record holder 1872–1879	Succeeded by Charley Jones
Sporting positions
Preceded by Charlie Gould	Cincinnati Reds (1876–1880) Managers; 1877	Succeeded by Bob Addy
