= Cincinnati Reds (1876–1879) =

Former Major League Baseball franchise

Information
- Location: Based in Cincinnati, Ohio
- Founded: 1876
- Folded: 1879
- Nickname: Cincinnati Red Stockings
- Former league: National League
- Former ballpark: Avenue Grounds (1876–1879)
- Colors: Red, white, black
- Ownership: J.W. Neff (1877–1879); Josiah "Si" Keck (1876–1877); John Joyce (1875)
- Manager: Deacon White (1879); Cal McVey (1878–1879); Jack Manning (1877); Bob Addy (1877); Lip Pike (1877); Charlie Gould (1876)

The Cincinnati Reds, also known as the Cincinnati Red Stockings, were a professional baseball team based in Cincinnati, Ohio that played from 1876–1879. The club predated the National League of which it became a charter member.

== History ==
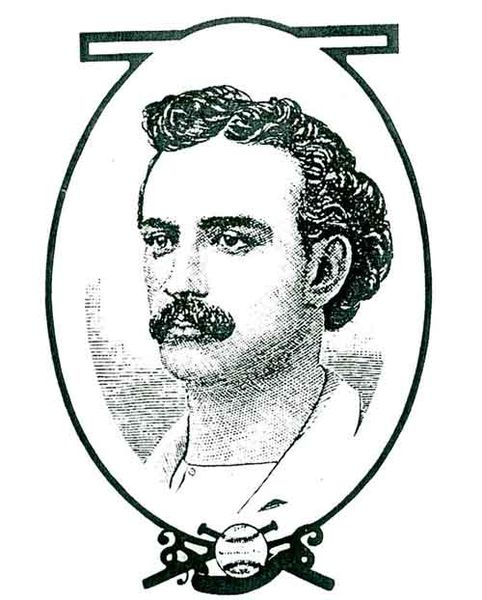
Lip Pike

John Joyce, who was an organizer of the Red Stockings club dismantled in 1870, formed a new club in 1875. Two players from the 1870 season returned as part of a new professional nine which played local amateur clubs. Joyce then sold the Reds to wealthy Cincinnati meat packer Josiah "Si" Keck during the winter. When the National League was formed on February 2, 1876 at the Grand Central Hotel in New York City, eight cities were selected to compete in the new major league: St. Louis, Hartford, Louisville, New York, Philadelphia, Chicago, Boston and Keck's Cincinnati club.

The Reds played at Avenue Grounds. They were managed by player/manager Charlie Gould, and outfielder Charley Jones led the Cincinnati offense with 4 home runs and 38 runs batted in. The 1876 team finished a dismal 9–56, last in the new eight-team National League; its winning percentage was the lowest in major-league history until the 1899 Cleveland Spiders surpassed it with a 20-134 record (.130). In 1877, helmed by the managing trio of Lip Pike, Bob Addy, and Jack Manning, the Reds finished 6th in the National League. Pike, the second baseman, led the team with 4 home runs and rookie pitcher Bobby Mitchell led the team with 41 strikeouts.

In the 1878 season, player/manager Cal McVey piloted Cincinnati to second place in the league. Charley Jones led the team with 3 homers and Will White led the team with 169 strikeouts. Sharing the managing duties, catcher Deacon White and McVey managed the team to 5th place. Starting pitcher Will White hurled 232 strikeouts. Baseball Hall of Fame member King Kelly played on the 1878 and '79 Reds.

Following the 1879 season, the club was disbanded. Justus Thorner, owner of the semi-professional Cincinnati Stars, purchased a new National League franchise and moved his club into the vacant spot left by the Reds; the Stars folded after the 1880 season. A new Reds franchise debuted in 1882 in the American Association, and joined the National League in 1890.

== Year-by-year records ==
Season	Manager	Games	W	L	T	WP	PL	GB
1876	Charlie Gould	65	9	56	0	.138	8th	42.5
1877	Lip Pike, Bob Addy & Jack Manning	58	15	42	1	.263	6th	25.5
1878	Cal McVey	61	37	23	1	.617	2nd	4.0
1879	Cal McVey & Deacon White	81	43	37	1	.538	5th	14.0

== Baseball Hall of Famers ==
Cincinnati Reds Hall of Famers
Inductee	Position	Tenure	Inducted
Candy Cummings	P	1877	1939
King Kelly	OF/C	1878–1879	1945
Deacon White	3B/C	1878–1879	2013
