= 1877 in baseball =

The following are the baseball events of the year 1877 throughout the world.

== Champions ==
- National League: Boston Red Caps
- International Association: London Tecumsehs
- League Alliance: Indianapolis Blues (West) & Syracuse Stars (East)
- New England Association: Lowell Ladies' Men
- New York State Championship Association: Syracuse Stars
- U.S. newspapers' poll: Boston Beaneaters (NL) and Lowell Ladies' Men (NEA) ranked #1 and #2 in the United States championship poll.
- Inter-league playoff: Lowell (NEA) def. Boston (NL) 2 games to 1
- Inter-league playoff: Syracuse (NYSCA) def. Boston (NL), 1 game to 0 (score 6–0)
- League Alliance Tournament winner: Syracuse Stars
- New York State Championship Tournament winner: Binghamton Crickets
- Inter-league playoff: Binghamton (NYSC) def. Boston (NL), 1 game to 0 (score 4–1)
- Inter-league competition: National League teams defeated New England Assn, teams, in wins 24–22.

== Statistical leaders ==
National League
Stat	Player	Total
AVG	Deacon White (BSN)	.387
HR	Lip Pike (CIN)	4
RBI	Deacon White (BSN)	49
W	Tommy Bond^{1} (BSN)	40
ERA	Tommy Bond^{1} (BSN)	2.11
K	Tommy Bond^{1} (BSN)	170

^{1} National League Triple Crown pitching winner

== National League final standings ==
National League
Team	W	L	Pct.	GB	Home	Road
Boston Red Caps	42	18	.700	—	27‍–‍5	15‍–‍13
Louisville Grays	35	25	.583	7	20‍–‍9	15‍–‍16
Brooklyn Hartfords	31	27	.534	10	19‍–‍8	12‍–‍19
St. Louis Brown Stockings	28	32	.467	14	20‍–‍10	8‍–‍22
Chicago White Stockings	26	33	.441	15½	17‍–‍12	9‍–‍21
Cincinnati Reds	15	42	.263	25½	12‍–‍18	3‍–‍24

Locations of teams for the 1877 National League season
National League

== Notable seasons ==
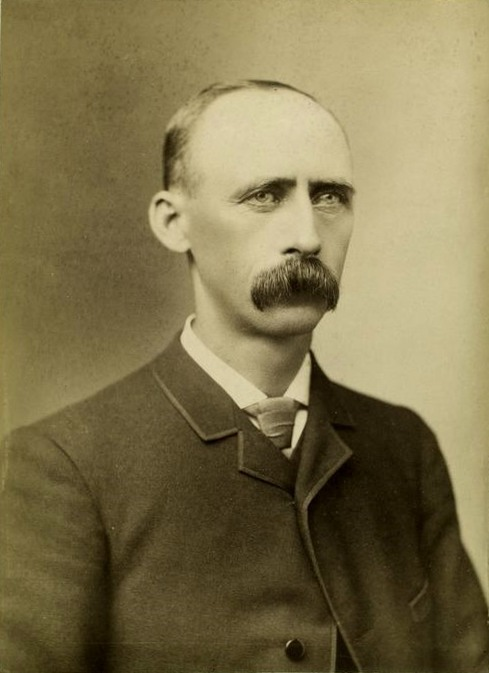
Deacon White

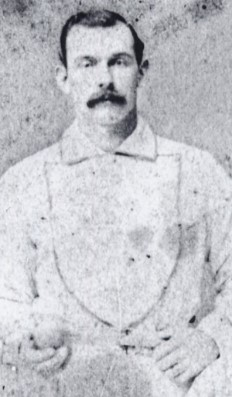
Jim Devlin

- Boston Red Stockings first baseman Deacon White leads the NL with 103 hits, 49 runs batted in, a .387 batting average, a .950 OPS, and a 193 OPS+.
- Boston Red Stockings pitcher Tommy Bond has a record of 40–17 and wins the NL triple crown with 40 wins, a 2.11 earned run average, and 170 strikeouts. His 521 innings pitched and 135 ERA+ both rank second in the league.
- Louisville Grays pitcher Jim Devlin has a record of 35–25 and an earned run average of 2.25. He leads the NL with 559 innings pitched and a 146 ERA+. His 35 wins and 141 strikeouts both rank second in the league. After the season ends, Devlin admits to throwing games and is banned from MLB for life.

== Events ==
=== January–March ===
- January 8 – Learning that a club can now assess a player 30 dollars for his uniform and 50 cents a day to defray the cost of meals while the team is on the road, third baseman Joe Battin balks at signing a contract with St. Louis for the coming season but eventually complies.
- February 3 – Cherokee Fisher admits taking $100 to throw a game from the 1876 season. Fisher will only appear in 1 more game in his career (1878) after his admission.
- February 20 – The International League, the first minor league, is formed in Pittsburgh.
- February 27 – Candy Cummings, player-manager of the Live Oaks of Lynn, Massachusetts, is elected President of the International League.
- March 5 – The Hartford club agrees to play its home games in Brooklyn. The team will retain the Hartford name, although it will only play 2 league games in Hartford.
- March 22 – The National League publishes the 1877 schedule. It is the first time the league has handled scheduling, a practice that continues to this day.

=== April–June ===
- April 12 – Jim Tyng, a catcher for Harvard, becomes the first backstop to wear a face mask during a game. Harvard team manager, Fred Thayer, will receive a patent for the mask in 1878.
- May 2 – Boston, who will win the pennant with a 42–18 record in 1877, lose an exhibition game to the Allegheny club of the International League. Pud Galvin tosses a one-hit shutout and hits a home run to defeat the Red Caps 1–0.
- May 3 – Five New England teams – the Fall River Cascades, Lowell Ladies' Men, Lynn Live Oaks, Manchester Reds and Providence Rhode Islands form the New England Association playing each other 10 games each for a 40-game schedule to decide the so-called "Championship of New England".
- May 4 – Five New York State teams – the Auburn Auburnians, Binghamton Crickets, Buffalo Bisons, Rochester Flour Citys and Syracuse Stars form the New York State Association playing each other 10 games each for a 40-game schedule to decide the so-called "Championship of New York State".
- May 5 – Baseball's first "minor league" of sorts is formed as the National League recruits 12 teams to play in the "League Alliance". The LA Eastern Division enlists the: Brooklyn Chelseas, Philadelphia Athletics and Syracuse Stars while the LA Western Division enlists the: Chicago Fairbanks, Indianapolis Hoosiers, Janesville Mutuals, Memphis Reds, Milwaukee Cream Citys, Minneapolis Browns, St. Paul Red Caps and Winona Clippers.
- May 10 – The Lowell Ladies' Men, members of the New England Association, affiliate themselves with the National League by joining the NL's "farm system", i.e. the League Alliance East Division. Lowell competes in both circuits and wins the pennant in each.
- May 17 – The National League votes to change to a livelier ball to replace the one described as being "dead enough to bury" in a special league meeting.
- June 5 – Star pitcher Albert Spalding makes his last career start on the mound.
- June 10 – St. Louis and Cincinnati play a Sunday exhibition game. It will be the one and only Sunday game played in professional baseball until 1892.
- June 18 – The Cincinnati club disbands after running out of money. The Buffalo Bisons of the New York Association also disband.
- June 21 – Cincinnati stockholders re-structure the club in order to keep it running and maintain its place in the National League but 2 players, Jimmy Hallinan and Charley Jones, have already been signed by Chicago. The Chicagos will return Jones on June 29, but will retain Hallinan.
- June 30 – Cincinnati signs Candy Cummings to help bolster their pitching. Cummings will continue to hold his position as President of the International League while playing in the NL.

=== July–September ===
- July 3 – Cincinnati loses to Louisville in their first game since re-organization. The Cincinnatis hope to avoid forfeiture of games played and expulsion by the National League by finishing out the season.
- July 11 – Pete Hotaling, of the Syracuse Stars in the International League, wears a catcher's mask in his first game back after missing a month after being struck in the eye by a foul ball.
- July 13 – George Bradley of Chicago ends his streak of pitching 88 consecutive games after playing third base in the Chicagos' victory.
- July 20 – Will White makes his major league debut. White is the first professional player to wear glasses. No other big-leaguer will wear glasses until Lee Meadows in 1915.
- August 6 – As per National League rules, Cal McVey of visiting Chicago randomly draws the umpire from 3 slips of paper placed in a hat for their game against first-place Louisville. When McVey draws an umpire named Dan Devinney, he disgustedly grabs the hat and discovers that all 3 pieces of paper have the same name on them. The angered Chicagos proceed to pound the Louisvilles 7–2.
- August 8 – Catcher Mike Dorgan of St. Louis, after seeing starter John Clapp get his jaw smashed by a foul ball, takes his place wearing a catcher's mask.
- August 12 – Johnny Quigley, a catcher for the Harlem Clippers, dies from injuries sustained in a collision with Dan Brouthers at home plate on July 7.
- August 20 – Louisville vice-president, Charles Chase, receives a telegram from an unknown source stating that something was going on with the Louisville players and that bettors were placing their money on Hartford in their game to be played that day. Hartford defeats Louisville 6–1.
- August 21 – Louisville loses again to Hartford 7–0.
- August 25
  - The Louisvilles surrender a run in the 8th and 2 more in the 9th and lose to second-place Boston 3–2 in the opener of a crucial 3 game series. The loss drops Louisville into a first-place tie with the Bostons.
  - Joe Battin and Joe Blong of St. Louis are named by gamblers in both cities as willing players in a loss to Chicago. Neither player ever appears in a National League game again.
- August 27 – Boston takes the second game of their series with Louisville by a score of 6–0. The victory gives them sole possession of first place over Louisville.
- August 28 – Boston completes the sweep over Louisville by winning 4–3.
- September 25 – Jim Devlin and George Hall of the Louisville Club are named by Louisville newspaper writer John Haldeman to have thrown an exhibition game played the previous day against Indianapolis. Both players will later admit this to club officials.
- September 29 – Boston clinches the pennant with an 8–4 victory over Hartford. Manager Harry Wright appears in his final game as a player.
- September 30 – The Lowell Ladies' Men clinch the New England Association pennant posting a 33–7 won-lost record.

=== October–December ===
- October 1 – The Syracuse Stars clinch the New York State Association pennant.
- October 2 – The London, Ontario, Tecumsehs win the first International Association championship with a 5–2 win over Pittsburgh.
- October 3 – The Indianapolis Hoosiers clinch the League Alliance Western division title.
- October 5 – Louisville wins its 4th consecutive game since Boston clinched the pennant.
- October 4 – Several newspapers around the U.S. declare Boston (most games won) and the Lowell Ladies' Men (best W-L percentage) to be the 2 best teams of pro baseball.
- October 15 – In an inter-league game played at Syracuse, New York, the New York State Association champion Syracuse Stars defeat National League champion Boston by a score of 6–0.
- October 20 – Tommy Bond demonstrates proof that a curveball really does curve by throwing it around stakes driven into the ground before an exhibition game.
- October 26 – Jim Devlin and George Hall are confronted by Louisville vice-president Charles Chase with charges of throwing games. Both players admit to the charges, and also implicate teammates Al Nichols and Bill Craver in the scandal.
- October 27 – The Louisville Club formally drops Jim Devlin, George Hall, Al Nichols and Bill Craver for their involvement in the fixing of games. The players' remaining salaries are forfeited to the team. Devlin's testimony included statements that the team had paid umpire Dan Devinney (see August 6) extra to call games in Louisville's favor in roughly 20 games during the season. The club denied the charge as a lie by Devlin, but the method for choosing umpires was changed by the National League before the 1878 season began.
- November 6 – The Lowell Ladies' Men, pennant winners of the New England Association, defeat NL champion Boston, 9–4, to win the 1877 Inter-League playoff between the champions of the 2 leagues, 3 games to 1. Newspapers around the country did not use the term "World Series" yet, instead referring to the series sometimes as the "United States' Series" or the "Inter-League Exhibitions".
- November 20 – The New York Clipper sporting periodical published a list of the results of interleague competition between the teams of the National League and the teams of the New England Association. The NEA teams win the 48-game competition against the NL teams with 24 victories, 23 defeats and 1 tied contest. In 50 decisions played between the National League and New York State Association teams, the NL teams win 33 games while the NYSA teams win 17. In 50 decisions between NL teams and the teams of the International Association the NL teams prevail winning 30 contests while the IA teams win 20 games.
- November 24 – The New York Mercury prints an amazingly accurate prediction about the future of baseball. "The baseball mania is getting so bad that every city will soon have a mammoth structure like the Roman Coliseum to play in. This will be illuminated by electric lights so that games can be played nights‚ thus overcoming a serious objection at present existing."
- December 4 – At its winter meetings, the National League formally confirms the expulsion of the 4 Louisville players. They also vote to throw out all of Cincinnati's games because they failed to pay their $100 league fee.
- December 5 – The National League accepts the withdrawal of the St. Louis franchise from the league. Cincinnati is re-admitted while Indianapolis and Milwaukee are admitted as new teams for the 1878 season.
- December 6 – William Hulbert is re-elected as president of the National League and limits are placed upon the amount of non-league games that teams may play. The league also strips Hartford of its membership due to continual financial problems.
- December 7 – The Providence Rhode Islands jump leagues- going from the New England Association to the National League. The team formally joins the NL on January 16, 1878.
- December 12 – Indianapolis and Milwaukee of the League Alliance announce their intention to join the National League for the 1878 season.
- December 30 – The Lowell Spindle Citys (formerly Ladies' Men), Lynn Live Oaks and Manchester Reds leave the New England Association and join the International Association. The remaining NEA team, Fall River Cascades, disbands – effectively ending the NEA.
- December 31 – The Auburn Auburnians, Binghamton Crickets, Rochester Flour Citys and Syracuse Stars leave the New York State Association and join the International Association – effectively ending the NYSA.

== Births ==
- January 22 – Tom Jones
- January 24 – Pop Rising
- February 4 – Germany Schaefer
- March 11 – Norwood Gibson
- April 2 – Ed Siever [1]
- April 5 – Wid Conroy
- May 16 – Art Williams
- July 20 – Red Kleinow
- September 7 – Mike O'Neill
- September 9 – Frank Chance
- September 29 – Harry Steinfeldt
- October 10 – Pep Deininger
- October 26 – Doc Newton
- November 4 – Tommy Leach
- November 23 – George Stovall
- November 30 – Tacks Latimer
- December 1 – Matt Broderick
- December 7 – Hobe Ferris

1 – Some sources show 1875

== Deaths ==
- October 1 – Ed Somerville, 24, second baseman for the Louisville Grays in 1876.
- December 18 – Archie Bush, 31, umpire for two game during the 1871 National Association season.
