= Home runs per nine innings =

In baseball statistics, home runs allowed per nine innings pitched (HR/9IP or HR/9) or home runs allowed per nine innings (denoted by HR/9) is the average number of home runs given up by a pitcher per nine innings pitched. It is determined by multiplying the number of home runs allowed by nine and dividing by the number of innings pitched. Pitchers with high fly ball rates are more likely than pitchers with high ground ball rates to have high HR/9 rates.

== Career leaders ==
=== Key ===
**Rank**	Rank amongst leaders in career earned run average. A blank field indicates a tie.
**Player**	Name of player.
**HR/9**	Total career home runs per nine innings pitched
**Innings pitched**	Total career innings pitched
**HR allowed**	Total career home runs allowed
**Teams played for**	Teams the player appeared with throughout their career
*	Denotes elected to National Baseball Hall of Fame.

=== All-time leaders ===
- Must have a minimum of 2,000 career innings pitched to qualify

Rank	Player	HR/9	Innings pitched	HR allowed	Teams played for
1	Al Spalding* (Note: Inducted into the Hall of Fame as a pioneer/executive.)	0.0468	2,886 1/3	15	Boston Red Stockings, Chicago White Stockings
2	Candy Cummings* (Note: Inducted into the Hall of Fame as a pioneer/executive.)	0.0502	2,149 2/3	12	Baltimore Canaries, Cincinnati Reds, Hartford Dark Blues, New York Mutuals, Philadelphia Whites
3	Ed Walsh*	0.0698	2,964 1/3	23	Chicago White Sox, Boston Braves
4	George Zettlein	0.0703	2,176 2/3	17	Brooklyn Eckfords, Chicago White Stockings, Philadelphia Athletics, Philadelphia Whites, Troy Haymakers
5	Addie Joss*	0.0735	2,327	19	Cleveland Blues/Napoleons/Naps
6	Eddie Plank*	0.0841	4,495 2/3	42	Philadelphia Athletics, St. Louis Browns, St. Louis Terriers
7	Dick McBride	0.0865	2,082	20	Boston Red Stockings, Philadelphia Athletics
8	Eddie Cicotte	0.0893	3,226	32	Boston Red Sox, Chicago White Sox, Detroit Tigers
9	Cy Falkenberg	0.0910	2,275	23	Brooklyn Tip-Tops, Cleveland Naps, Newark Peppers/Indianapolis Hoosiers, Philadelphia Athletics, Pittsburgh Pirates, Washington Nationals
10	Bill Donovan	0.0911	2,964 2/3	30	Brooklyn Superbas, Detroit Tigers, New York Yankees, Washington Senators

=== Active leaders ===
- Must have a minimum of 1,000 career innings pitched to qualify
- Updated through April 24, 2026

Rank	Player	HR/9	Innings pitched	HR allowed	Teams played for (current team in bold)
1	Logan Webb	0.6222	1,099 1/3	76	**San Francisco Giants**
2	Framber Valdez	0.7131	1,110 2/3	88	**Detroit Tigers**, Houston Astros
3	Max Fried	0.7358	1,121	91	Atlanta Braves, **New York Yankees**
4	Jacob deGrom	0.8626	1,565	150	New York Mets, **Texas Rangers**
5	Blake Snell	0.8627	1,158	111	**Los Angeles Dodgers**, San Diego Padres, San Francisco Giants, Tampa Bay Rays
6	Zach Wheeler	0.8644	1,728 1/3	166	New York Mets, **Philadelphia Phillies**
7	Sonny Gray	0.9042	1,941	195	**Boston Red Sox**, Cincinnati Reds, Minnesota Twins, New York Yankees, Oakland Athletics, St. Louis Cardinals
8	Chris Sale	0.9285	2,113	218	**Atlanta Braves**, Boston Red Sox, Chicago White Sox
9	Justin Verlander	0.9375	3,571 1/3	372 (Note: Active leader in home runs allowed; tied with Jim Bunning and Dennis Martínez for the 23rd most all-time.)	**Detroit Tigers**, Houston Astros, New York Mets, San Francisco Giants
10	José Quintana	0.9456	2,114 1/3	222	Chicago Cubs, Chicago White Sox, **Colorado Rockies**, Los Angeles Angels, Milwaukee Brewers, New York Mets, Pittsburgh Pirates, San Francisco Giants, St. Louis Cardinals

=== Negro Major Leagues ===
- Must have a minimum of 600 career innings pitched in the Negro Major Leagues to qualify.
- Only Negro Major League statistics are included in this table

Rank	Player	HR/9	Innings pitched	HR allowed
1	Dave Brown	0.0723	746 2/3	6
2	Satchel Paige*	0.1058	1,275 2/3	15
3	Butch Glass	0.1222	810 1/3	11
4	Hilton Smith*	0.1241	943	13
5	Harry Salmon	0.1308	963 1/3	14
6	Bullet Rogan*	0.1320	1,500	22
7	William Bell	0.1376	1,438 2/3	22
8	Willie Powell	0.1398	772 2/3	12
9	Bill Drake	0.1424	1,263 2/3	20
10	Ed Rile	0.1443	748 2/3	12

== Annual leaders ==
=== National League ===
- Must have 1.0 innings pitched per team game to qualify

Year	Leader	HR/9	HR allowed	Innings pitched	Team	Runner-up	HR/9	HR allowed	Innings pitched
1876	Candy Cummings, Lon Knight	0.0000	0	216 (Cummings), 282 (Knight)	Hartford Dark Blues (Cummings), Philadelphia Athletics (Knight)	Dory Dean	0.0343	1	262 2/3
1877	Joe Blong, Bobby Matthews, Bobby Mitchell	0.0000	0	187 1/3 (Blong), 129 1/3 (Matthews), 100 (Mitchell)	St. Louis Brown Stockings (Blong), Cincinnati Reds (Matthews and Mitchell)	Terry Larkin	0.0359	2	501
1878	Jim McCormick, Tricky Nichols	0.0000	0	117 (McCormick), 98 (Nichols)	Indianapolis Blues (McCormick), Providence Grays (Nichols)	Will White	0.0192	1	468
1879	Frank Hankinson, Bill McGunnigle, Harry Salisbury	0.0000	0	230 2/3 (Hankinson), 120 (McGunnigle), 89 (Salisbury)	Chicago White Stockings (Hankinson), Buffalo Bisons (McGunnigle), Troy Trojans (Salisbury)	Pud Galvin	0.0455	3	593
1880	Tim Keefe	0.0000	0	105	Troy Trojans	Bill McGunnigle	0.0183	1	493
1881	John Fox	0.0000	0	124 1/3	Boston Red Caps	Old Hoss Radbourn	0.0277	1	325 1/3
1882	Jim Whitney	0.0643	3	420	Boston Red Caps	Tim Keefe	0.0957	4	376
1883	Jim McCormick	0.0263	1	342	Cleveland Blues	Will Sawyer	0.0638	1	141
1884	Pretzels Getzien	0.1222	2	147 1/3	Detroit Wolverines	John Harkins	0.1611	7	391
1885	John Kirby	0.0000	0	129 1/3	St. Louis Maroons	Henry Boyle	0.0491	2	366 2/3
1886	Egyptian Healy	0.1272	5	353 2/3	St. Louis Maroons	Pretzels Getzien	0.1397	6	386 2/3
1887	Mickey Welch	0.1821	7	346	New York Giants	Pete Conway	0.1849	3	146
1888	Bill Sowders	0.0852	3	317	Boston Beaneaters	Ben Sanders	0.0981	3	275 1/3
1889	Ed Morris	0.2118	4	170	Pittsburgh Alleghenys	Tim Keefe	0.2225	9	364
1890	Amos Rusie	0.0492	3	548 2/3	New York Giants	Adonis Terry	0.0730	3	370
1891	John Ewing	0.0668	2	269 1/3	New York Giants	Lee Viau	0.0786	3	343 2/3
1892	Scott Stratton	0.0256	1	351 2/3	Louisville Colonels	Duke Esper	0.1007	2	178 2/3
1893	Red Ehret	0.0859	1	314 1/3	Pittsburgh Pirates	Tom Parrott	0.0994	2	181
1894	Willie McGill	0.0865	2	208	Chicago Colts	Frank Killen	0.1324	3	204
1895	Brownie Foreman	0.0000	0	139 2/3	Pittsburgh Pirates	Duke Esper	0.0824	2	218 1/3
1896	Bill Hoffer	0.0291	1	309	Baltimore Orioles	Pink Hawley	0.0476	2	378
1897	Joe Corbett	0.0575	2	309	Baltimore Orioles	Jesse Tannehill	0.0634	1	142
1898	Billy Rhines	0.0000	0	258	Pittsburgh Pirates	Clark Griffith	0.0276	1	325 2/3
1899	Billy Rhines	0.0333	1	270 2/3	Philadelphia Phillies	Jerry Nops	0.0347	1	259
1900	Sam Leever	0.0774	2	232 2/3	Pittsburgh Pirates	Jerry Nops	0.1154	3	234
1901	Bill Donovan	0.0256	1	356	Brooklyn Superbas	Jesse Tannehill	0.0357	1	252 1/3
1902	Ed Doheny, Jesse Tannehill, John Malarkey	0.0000	0	188 1/3 (Doheny), 231 (Tannehill), 170 1/3 (Malarkey)	Pittsburgh Pirates (Doheny & Tannehill), Boston Nationals (Malarkey)	Bill Donovan	0.0302	1	297 2/3
1903	Ed Doheny	0.0302	1	297 2/3	Pittsburgh Pirates	Carl Lundgren	0.0466	1	193
1904	Togie Pittinger	0.0268	1	335 1/3	Boston Nationals	Jake Weimer	0.0293	1	307
1905	Deacon Phillippe, Elmer Stricklett	0.0000	0	279 (Phillippe), 237 1/3 (Stricklett)	Pittsburgh Pirates (Phillippe), Brooklyn Superbas (Stricklett)	Ed Reulbach	0.0309	1	291 2/3
1906	Ed Karger, Jake Weimer, Vic Willis	0.0000	0	219 2/3 (Karger), 304 2/3 (Weimer), 322 (Willis)	Pittsburgh Pirates / St. Louis Cardinals (Karger), Cincinnati Reds (Weimer), Pittsburgh Pirates (Willis)	Joe McGinnity	0.0265	1	339 2/3
1906	Ed Karger, Jake Weimer, Vic Willis	0.0000	0	219 2/3 (Karger), 304 2/3 (Weimer), 322 (Willis)	Pittsburgh Pirates / St. Louis Cardinals (Karger), Cincinnati Reds (Weimer), Pittsburgh Pirates (Willis)	Joe McGinnity	0.0265	1	339 2/3
1907	Howie Camnitz, Frank Corridon, Carl Lundgren	0.0000	0	180 (Camnitz), 274 (Corridon), 207 (Lundgren)	Pittsburgh Pirates (Camnitz), Philadelphia Phillies (Corridon), Chicago Cubs (Lundgren)	Lefty Leifield	0.0315	1	286
1908	Frank Corridon	0.0000	0	208 1/3	Philadelphia Phillies	George McQuillan	0.0250	1	359 2/3
1909	Frank Corridon, Harry Gaspar, Jack Rowan	0.0000	0	171 (Corridon), 260 (Gaspar), 225 2/3 (Rowan)	Philadelphia Phillies (Corridon), Cincinnati Reds (Gaspar & Rowan)	Mordecai Brown	0.0263	1	342 2/3
1910	Howie Camnitz	0.0346	1	260	Pittsburgh Pirates	Bob Harmon	0.0381	1	236
1911	Red Ames	0.0000	0	205	New York Giants	Elmer Knetzer	0.0441	1	204
