= 1876 Major League Baseball season =

1876 MLB season
- League: National League (NL)
- Sport: Baseball
- Duration: April 22 – October 21, 1876
- Games: 57–70
- Teams: 8

Pennant winner
- NL champions: Chicago White Stockings
- NL runners-up: Hartford Dark Blues

MLB seasons
- ← 1875 (National Association) 1877 →

Locations of teams for the 1876 National League season
National League

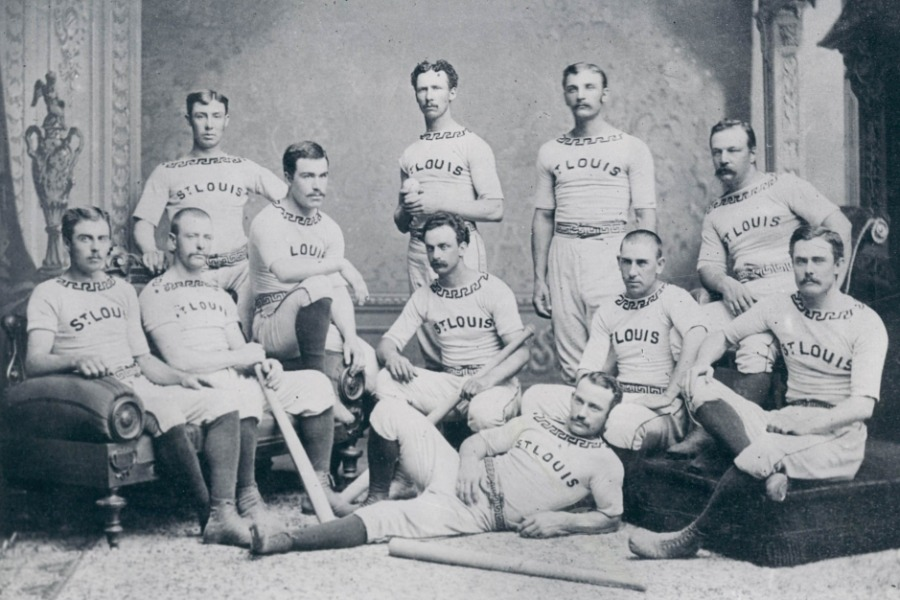
1876 St. Louis Brown Stockings baseball teamBack row: Joe Blong, George Bradley, Herman DehlmanMiddle row: Joe Battin, John Clapp, Tim McGinley, Lip Pike, Mike McGeary, Dickey Pearce, Denny MackFront row: Ned Cuthbert

The 1876 major league baseball season was contested from April 22 through October 21, 1876, and saw the Chicago White Stockings as the pennant winner of the inaugural season of the National League and of Major League baseball. (Note: As recognized by Major League Baseball. Some sources, such as Baseball Reference and Retrosheet, include the five 1871–1875 seasons of the National Association as major league seasons.) There was no postseason.

The National League was established on February 2, 1876 as a successor to the National Association of Professional Base Ball Players (NAPBBP or National Association (NA)), as a means to concentrate quality of talent and reduce the number of poor-drawing games played against low-quality competition in small towns (such as the 1875 Keokuk Westerns, located in the small Iowan town of Keokuk, which only had about 12,500 people). The NA also suffered from lack of strong authority over clubs, unsupervised scheduling, unstable membership of cities, dominance by one team (the Boston Red Stockings), and an extremely low entry fee ($10, equivalent to $293 in 2025) that gave clubs no incentive to abide by league rules when it was inconvenient to them.

Six teams from the NA would be established as charter members of the National League, including the Boston Red Stockings (renamed the Red Caps, surviving today as the Atlanta Braves), Chicago White Stockings (surviving today as the Chicago Cubs), Hartford Dark Blues, New York Mutuals, Philadelphia Athletics, and St. Louis Brown Stockings. Two non-NA teams would join as charter members, including the Cincinnati Reds (unrelated to the modern team) and Louisville Grays.

== Schedule ==
The 1876 schedule was formatted so that each team would play up to 10 games against each team in the league (split evenly between home and away games), for a maximum of 70 games (only fulfilled by the Boston Red Caps). Any game played against a team at home must be played within two months' time away, "under penalty of forfeiture." This was the only season that the National League adopted this format. The following season would see a more regulated format, requiring teams to schedule 12 games against each team.

Opening Day took place on April 22 featuring a game between the Boston Red Caps and Athletics of Philadelphia. The final day of the season was on October 21, featuring a game between the Hartford Dark Blues and Boston Red Caps.

The first doubleheader in major league history occurred on September 9 between the Cincinnati Reds and Hartford Dark Blues.

The year ended with the first postseason competition in major league history. The contest featured the first and second-place regular season finishers. The Saint Louis Brown Stockings defeated the Chicago White Stockings three games to two in a best-of-five "Championship of the West."

== National League framework ==
A framework was outlined to remedy ills and shortcomings of the 1871–1875 National Association:

- First: No club should be allowed to enter for the championship unless it be backed by a responsible association, financially capable of finishing a season when begun.
- Second: No club should be admitted from a city of less size than 100,000 inhabitants, excepting only Hartford. (This would later be amended to 75,000).
- Third: No two clubs should be admitted from the same city.
- Fourth: The faith of the management of a club should be shown by the deposit of $1,000, or perhaps $1,500 ($30234 and $45352 in 2025), in the hands of the association before the season begins. This sum not to be played for but returned to each club which carries out its agreements and plays its return games. If it refuses to play all the games that it agrees to, let the sum be forfeited.

== Teams ==
League	Team	City	Ballpark	Capacity	Manager
National League	Boston Red Caps	Boston, Massachusetts	South End Grounds	3,000	Harry Wright
National League	Chicago White Stockings	Chicago, Illinois	23rd Street Grounds	7,000	Albert Spalding
National League	Cincinnati Reds	Cincinnati, Ohio	Avenue Grounds	Unknown	Charlie Gould
National League	Hartford Dark Blues	Hartford, Connecticut	Hartford Ball Club Grounds	10,000	Bob Ferguson
National League	Louisville Grays	Louisville, Kentucky	Louisville Baseball Park	4,500	Jack Chapman
National League	New York Mutuals	Brooklyn, New York	Union Grounds	1,500	Bill Craver
National League	Philadelphia Athletics	Philadelphia, Pennsylvania	Jefferson Street Grounds	5,000	Al Wright
National League	St. Louis Brown Stockings	St. Louis, Missouri	Grand Avenue Ball Grounds	Unknown	Mase Graffen
National League	St. Louis Brown Stockings	St. Louis, Missouri	Grand Avenue Ball Grounds	Unknown	George McManus

1. In today's New York, New York.

== Standings ==
=== National League ===
National League
Team	W	L	Pct.	GB	Home	Road
Chicago White Stockings	52	14	.788	—	25‍–‍6	27‍–‍8
Hartford Dark Blues	47	21	.691	6	23‍–‍9	24‍–‍12
St. Louis Brown Stockings	45	19	.703	6	24‍–‍6	21‍–‍13
Boston Red Caps	39	31	.557	15	19‍–‍17	20‍–‍14
Louisville Grays	30	36	.455	22	15‍–‍16	15‍–‍20
New York Mutuals	21	35	.375	26	13‍–‍20	8‍–‍15
Philadelphia Athletics	14	45	.237	34½	10‍–‍24	4‍–‍21
Cincinnati Reds	9	56	.138	42½	6‍–‍24	3‍–‍32

=== Tie games ===
Three tie games, which are not factored into winning percentage or games behind occurred throughout the season (though standings were determined by total wins, not winning percentage).

The Louisville Grays had three tie games. The Hartford Dark Blues, New York Mutuals, and Philadelphia Athletics had one tie game each.

- May 25, Louisville Grays vs. Philadelphia Athletics, tied at 2.
- June 21, Hartford Dark Blues vs. Louisville Grays, tied at 5.
- July 8, New York Mutuals vs. Louisville Grays, tied at 5.

== Managerial changes ==
=== Off-season ===
Team	Former Manager	New Manager
Brooklyn Atlantics	Bill Boyd	Team not invited to National League, continues as independent
Chicago White Stockings	Jimmy Wood	Albert Spalding
New Haven Elm Citys	Charlie Pabor	Team folded
New York Mutuals	Nat Hicks	Bill Craver
Philadelphia Athletics	Cap Anson	Al Wright
Philadelphia Centennials	Bill Craver	Team folded
Philadelphia White Stockings	Bob Addy	Team folded
St. Louis Brown Stockings	Dickey Pearce	Mase Graffen

=== In-season ===
Team	Former Manager	New Manager
St. Louis Brown Stockings	Mase Graffen	George McManus

== League leaders ==
=== National League ===
Hitting leaders
Stat	Player	Total
AVG	Ross Barnes (CHI)	.429
OPS	Ross Barnes (CHI)	1.052
HR	George Hall (PHI)	5
RBI	Deacon White (BSN)	60
R	Ross Barnes (CHI)	126
H	Ross Barnes (CHI)	138

Pitching leaders
Stat	Player	Total
W	Albert Spalding (CHI)	47
L	Jim Devlin (LOU)	35
ERA	George Bradley (STL)	1.23
K	Jim Devlin (LOU)	122
IP	Jim Devlin (LOU)	622.0
SV	Jack Manning (BSN)	5
WHIP	George Bradley (STL)	0.887

== Milestones ==
=== Pitchers ===
==== No-hitters ====
- George Bradley (STL):
  - Pitched the first no-hitter in Major League history and the only in franchise history, by defeating the Hartford Dark Blues 2–0 on July 15.

==== Other pitching accomplishments ====
- George Bradley (STL):
  - Set a Major League record for most shutout wins in a season, throwing 16 shutouts.

=== Miscellaneous ===
- Hartford Dark Blues:
  - Set a major league record for most runs scored in the fourth inning, by scoring 15 runs against the New York Mutuals on May 13.

== Venues ==
The 1876 season saw the formation of National League, and with eight teams joining the league:

- The Boston Red Caps played at South End Grounds.
- The Chicago White Stockings played at 23rd Street Grounds.
- The Cincinnati Reds played at Avenue Grounds.
- The Hartford Dark Blues played at the Hartford Ball Club Grounds.
- The Louisville Grays played at Louisville Baseball Park.
- The New York Mutuals played at the Union Grounds.
- The Philadelphia Athletics played at the Jefferson Street Grounds.
- The St. Louis Brown Stockings played at the Grand Avenue Ball Grounds.

The Hartford Dark Blues would play their final game at the Hartford Ball Club Grounds on September 16 against the St. Louis Brown Stockings, relocating to Brooklyn, New York at the Union Grounds as the Brooklyn Hartfords for the start of the 1877 season.

== See also ==
- 1876 in baseball (Events, Births, Deaths)
