= 1876 New York Mutuals season =

1876 New York Mutuals
- League: National League
- Ballpark: Union Grounds
- City: New York, New York
- Record: 21–35 (.375)
- League place: 6th
- Owner: Bill Cammeyer
- Manager: Bill Cammeyer

The 1876 New York Mutuals concluded their sole season in the National League with a 21–35 win-loss record, placing them sixth in the standings. Following five seasons in the National Association, their participation in the National League was brief, ending with their expulsion for refusing a late-season road trip

== Regular season ==
=== Season standings ===
National League
Team	W	L	Pct.	GB	Home	Road
Chicago White Stockings	52	14	.788	—	25‍–‍6	27‍–‍8
Hartford Dark Blues	47	21	.691	6	23‍–‍9	24‍–‍12
St. Louis Brown Stockings	45	19	.703	6	24‍–‍6	21‍–‍13
Boston Red Caps	39	31	.557	15	19‍–‍17	20‍–‍14
Louisville Grays	30	36	.455	22	15‍–‍16	15‍–‍20
New York Mutuals	21	35	.375	26	13‍–‍20	8‍–‍15
Philadelphia Athletics	14	45	.237	34½	10‍–‍24	4‍–‍21
Cincinnati Reds	9	56	.138	42½	6‍–‍24	3‍–‍32

=== Record vs. opponents ===
1876 National League record Sources:
Team	BSN	CHI	CIN	HAR	LOU	NYM	PHN	STL
Boston	—	1–9	10–0	2–8	5–5	8–2	9–1	4–6
Chicago	9–1	—	10–0	6–4	9–1	7–1	7–1	4–6
Cincinnati	0–10	0–10	—	1–9	2–8	1–7	3–5	2–7
Hartford	8–2	4–6	9–1	—	9–1–1	4–4	9–1	4–6
Louisville	5–5	1–9	8–2	1–9–1	—	5–3–1	6–2–1	4–6
New York	2–8	1–7	7–1	4–4	3–5–1	—	3–4	1–6
Philadelphia	1–9	1–7	5–3	1–9	2–6–1	4–3	—	0–8
St. Louis	6–4	6–4	7–2	6–4	6–4	6–1	8–0	—

=== Roster ===
1876 New York Mutuals
Roster
Pitchers: Terry Larkin; Bobby Mathews; Catchers: Nat Hicks; Bob Valentine	Infielders: Bill Craver; George Fair; Davy Force; Jimmy Hallinan; John Hatfield; George Heubel; John McGuinness; Al Nichols; George Seward; Joe Start; Pete Treacey; Billy West	Outfielders: George Bechtel; Eddie Booth; John Hayes; Jim Holdsworth; John Maloney; Nealy Phelps; Jim Shanley; Fred Treacey	Manager: Bill Cammeyer

== Player stats ==
=== Batting ===
==== Starters by position ====
Note: Pos = Position; G = Games played; AB = At bats; H = Hits; Avg. = Batting average; HR = Home runs; RBI = Runs batted in

Pos	Player	G	AB	H	Avg.	HR	RBI
C	Nat Hicks	45	188	44	.234	0	15
1B	Joe Start	56	264	73	.277	0	21
2B	Bill Craver	56	246	55	.224	0	22
3B	Al Nichols	57	212	38	.179	0	9
SS	Jimmy Hallinan	54	240	67	.279	2	36
OF	Fred Treacey	57	256	54	.211	0	18
OF	Eddie Booth	57	228	49	.215	0	7
OF	Jim Holdsworth	52	241	64	.266	0	19

==== Other batters ====
Note: G = Games played; AB = At bats; H = Hits; Avg. = Batting average; HR = Home runs; Runs batted in

Player	G	AB	H	Avg.	HR	RBI
John Hayes	5	21	3	.143	0	2
George Bechtel	2	10	3	.300	0	0
Jim Shanley	2	8	1	.125	0	0
John Maloney	2	7	2	.286	0	2
Pete Treacey	2	5	0	.000	0	0
George Fair	1	4	0	.000	0	0
John Hatfield	1	4	1	.250	0	0
George Heubel	1	4	0	.000	0	0
John McGuinness	1	4	0	.000	0	0
Billy West	1	4	0	.000	0	0
Davy Force	1	3	0	.000	0	0
Nealy Phelps	1	3	0	.000	0	0
George Seward	1	3	0	.000	0	0
Bob Valentine	1	3	0	.000	0	0

=== Pitching ===
==== Starting pitchers ====
Note: G = Games pitched; IP = Innings pitched; W = Wins; L = Losses; ERA = Earned run average; SO = Strikeouts

Player	G	IP	W	L	ERA	SO
Bobby Mathews	56	516.0	21	34	2.86	37
Terry Larkin	1	9.0	0	1	3.00	0

==== Relief pitchers ====
Note: G = Games pitched; W = Wins; L = Losses; SV = Saves; ERA = Earned run average; SO = Strikeouts

Player	G	W	L	SV	ERA	SO
Eddie Booth	1	0	0	0	10.80	0
