= 1876 Cincinnati Reds season =

1876 Cincinnati Reds
- League: National League
- Ballpark: Avenue Grounds
- City: Cincinnati, Ohio
- Record: 9–56 (.138)
- League place: 8th
- Managers: Charlie Gould

The 1876 Cincinnati Reds season was a season in American baseball. It was the team's first season of existence, having been formed as part of the brand new National League in 1876. This team was not related (except by name) to the previous Cincinnati Red Stockings National Association team, which had folded in 1870.

== Regular season ==
The play of Charley Jones, who led the club with a batting average of .286, was noteworthy during this season. Jones had the second highest home run total in the league with four. He was also among the league leaders in doubles and slugging percentage.

=== Season summary ===
The Reds played their first ever game on April 25, 1876, defeating the St. Louis Brown Stockings 2–1 at Avenue Grounds. Wins would be few and far between for the Reds, as after putting up a solid 3–2 record in their opening five games, the Reds would go on an eleven-game losing streak to fall to 3–13. After defeating the Hartford Dark Blues 8–2 to end their losing streak, the Reds would then have a thirteen-game losing streak, and saw their record fall to 4–26. By the time the season was finished, Cincinnati had the worst record in the National League, as they ended the season with a 9–56 record, 42.5 games behind the first place Chicago White Stockings.

=== Season standings ===
National League
Team	W	L	Pct.	GB	Home	Road
Chicago White Stockings	52	14	.788	—	25‍–‍6	27‍–‍8
Hartford Dark Blues	47	21	.691	6	23‍–‍9	24‍–‍12
St. Louis Brown Stockings	45	19	.703	6	24‍–‍6	21‍–‍13
Boston Red Caps	39	31	.557	15	19‍–‍17	20‍–‍14
Louisville Grays	30	36	.455	22	15‍–‍16	15‍–‍20
New York Mutuals	21	35	.375	26	13‍–‍20	8‍–‍15
Philadelphia Athletics	14	45	.237	34½	10‍–‍24	4‍–‍21
Cincinnati Reds	9	56	.138	42½	6‍–‍24	3‍–‍32

=== Record vs. opponents ===
1876 National League record Sources:
Team	BSN	CHI	CIN	HAR	LOU	NYM	PHN	STL
Boston	—	1–9	10–0	2–8	5–5	8–2	9–1	4–6
Chicago	9–1	—	10–0	6–4	9–1	7–1	7–1	4–6
Cincinnati	0–10	0–10	—	1–9	2–8	1–7	3–5	2–7
Hartford	8–2	4–6	9–1	—	9–1–1	4–4	9–1	4–6
Louisville	5–5	1–9	8–2	1–9–1	—	5–3–1	6–2–1	4–6
New York	2–8	1–7	7–1	4–4	3–5–1	—	3–4	1–6
Philadelphia	1–9	1–7	5–3	1–9	2–6–1	4–3	—	0–8
St. Louis	6–4	6–4	7–2	6–4	6–4	6–1	8–0	—

=== Game log ===
Legend
Reds Win	Reds Loss	Game postponed

1876 Game Log: 9–56 (Home: 6–24; Away: 3–32)
April: 2–1 (Home: 2–1; Away: 0–0)

#	Date	Opponent	Score	Stadium	Attendance	Record	Streak
1	April 25	Brown Stockings	2–1	Avenue Grounds	N/A	1–0	W1
2	April 27	Brown Stockings	5–2	Avenue Grounds	N/A	2–0	W2
3	April 29	White Stockings	5–11	Avenue Grounds	N/A	2–1	L1

May: 1–12 (Home: 1–2; Away: 0–10)

#	Date	Opponent	Score	Stadium	Attendance	Record	Streak
4	May 2	White Stockings	9–15	Avenue Grounds	N/A	2–2	L2
5	May 4	Grays	3–2	Avenue Grounds	N/A	3–2	W1
6	May 6	Grays	8–13	Avenue Grounds	N/A	3–3	L1
7	May 10	@ White Stockings	0–6	23rd Street Grounds	5,000	3–4	L2
8	May 11	@ White Stockings	5–9	23rd Street Grounds	3,000	3–5	L3
9	May 13	@ Brown Stockings	0–11	Sportsman's Park	N/A	3–6	L4
10	May 16	@ Brown Stockings	1–11	Sportsman's Park	N/A	3–7	L5
11	May 18	@ Grays	3–9	Louisville Baseball Park	N/A	3–8	L6
12	May 20	@ Grays	1–3	Louisville Baseball Park	N/A	3–9	L7
13	May 23	@ Red Caps	0–8	South End Grounds	N/A	3–10	L8
14	May 25	@ Red Caps	0–4	South End Grounds	N/A	3–11	L9
15	May 27	@ Red Caps	5–8	South End Grounds	N/A	3–12	L10
16	May 30	@ Dark Blues	0–6	Hartford Ball Club Grounds	N/A	3–13	L11

June: 1–12 (Home: 0–5; Away: 1–7)

#	Date	Opponent	Score	Stadium	Attendance	Record	Streak
17	June 1	@ Dark Blues	8–2	Hartford Ball Club Grounds	N/A	4–13	W1
18	June 3	@ Dark Blues	2–7	Hartford Ball Club Grounds	N/A	4–14	L1
19	June 6	@ Mutuals	0–2	Union Grounds	N/A	4–15	L2
20	June 8	@ Mutuals	5–21	Union Grounds	N/A	4–16	L3
21	June 10	@ Mutuals	0–1	Union Grounds	N/A	4–17	L4
22	June 14	@ Athletics	5–20	Jefferson Street Grounds	N/A	4–18	L5
23	June 15	@ Athletics	6–11	Jefferson Street Grounds	N/A	4–19	L6
24	June 17	@ Athletics	15–23	Jefferson Street Grounds	N/A	4–20	L7
25	June 20	Red Caps	7–14	Avenue Grounds	N/A	4–21	L8
26	June 22	Red Caps	5–8	Avenue Grounds	N/A	4–22	L9
27	June 24	Red Caps	7–8	Avenue Grounds	N/A	4–23	L10
28	June 27	Dark Blues	2–5	Avenue Grounds	N/A	4–24	L11
29	June 27	Dark Blues	6–13	Avenue Grounds	N/A	4–25	L12

July: 2–10 (Home: 2–4; Away: 0–6)

#	Date	Opponent	Score	Stadium	Attendance	Record	Streak
30	July 4	Athletics	3–6	Avenue Grounds	N/A	4–26	L13
31	July 6	Athletics	5–2	Avenue Grounds	N/A	5–26	W1
32	July 8	Athletics	7–5	Avenue Grounds	N/A	6–26	W2
33	July 11	Mutuals	2–8	Avenue Grounds	N/A	6–27	L1
34	July 13	Mutuals	6–13	Avenue Grounds	N/A	6–28	L2
35	July 15	Mutuals	6–8	Avenue Grounds	N/A	6–29	L3
36	July 18	@ Brown Stockings	1–5	Sportsman's Park	N/A	6–30	L4
37	July 20	@ Brown Stockings	1–9	Sportsman's Park	N/A	6–31	L5
38	July 22	@ Brown Stockings	1–5	Sportsman's Park	N/A	6–32	L6
39	July 25	@ White Stockings	3–23	23rd Street Grounds	N/A	6–33	L7
40	July 27	@ White Stockings	3–17	23rd Street Grounds	N/A	6–34	L8
41	July 29	@ White Stockings	2–9	23rd Street Grounds	N/A	6–35	L9

August: 1–10 (Home: 1–7; Away: 0–3)

#	Date	Opponent	Score	Stadium	Attendance	Record	Streak
42	August 1	Brown Stockings	3–19	Avenue Grounds	N/A	6–36	L10
43	August 3	Brown Stockings	0–10	Avenue Grounds	N/A	6–37	L11
44	August 8	White Stockings	3–13	Avenue Grounds	N/A	6–38	L12
45	August 10	White Stockings	0–6	Avenue Grounds	N/A	6–39	L13
46	August 12	White Stockings	0–5	Avenue Grounds	N/A	6–40	L14
47	August 15	@ Grays	5–17	Louisville Baseball Park	N/A	6–41	L15
48	August 18	@ Grays	1–4	Louisville Baseball Park	N/A	6–42	L16
49	August 19	@ Grays	3–6	Louisville Baseball Park	N/A	6–43	L17
50	August 22	Grays	0–8	Avenue Grounds	N/A	6–44	L18
51	August 25	Grays	3–1	Avenue Grounds	N/A	7–44	W1
52	August 26	Grays	2–3	Avenue Grounds	N/A	7–45	L1

September: 2–8 (Home: 0–2; Away: 2–6)

#	Date	Opponent	Score	Stadium	Attendance	Record	Streak
53	September 5	@ Red Caps	4–17	South End Grounds	N/A	7–46	L2
54	September 6	@ Red Caps	3–7	South End Grounds	N/A	7–47	L3
55	September 9 (1)	@ Dark Blues	4–14	Hartford Ball Club Grounds	N/A	7–48	L4
56	September 9 (2)	@ Dark Blues	4–8	Hartford Ball Club Grounds	N/A	7–49	L5
57	September 12	@ Athletics	3–12	Jefferson Street Grounds	N/A	7–50	L6
58	September 13	@ Athletics	15–13	Jefferson Street Grounds	N/A	8–50	W1
59	September 15	@ Mutuals	1–2	Union Grounds	N/A	8–51	L1
60	September 16	@ Mutuals	9–6	Union Grounds	N/A	9–51	W1
61	September 27	Red Caps	3–5	Avenue Grounds	N/A	9–52	L1
62	September 28	Red Caps	7–10	Avenue Grounds	N/A	9–53	L2

October: 0–3 (Home: 0–3; Away: 0–0)

#	Date	Opponent	Score	Stadium	Attendance	Record	Streak
63	October 6	Dark Blues	4–7	Avenue Grounds	N/A	9–54	L3
64	October 7	Dark Blues	6–11	Avenue Grounds	N/A	9–55	L4
65	October 9	Dark Blues	0–11	Avenue Grounds	N/A	9–56	L5

=== Roster ===
1876 Cincinnati Reds
Roster
Pitchers: Dory Dean; Cherokee Fisher; Dale Williams	Catchers: Sam Field; Dave Pierson; Infielders: Amos Booth; Will Foley; Charlie Gould; Henry Kessler; Charlie Sweasy	Outfielders: Bobby Clack; Charley Jones; Redleg Snyder	Manager: Charlie Gould

== Player stats ==
=== Batting ===
==== Starters by position ====
- Note: Pos = Position; G = Games played; AB = At bats; H = Hits; Avg. = Batting average; HR = Home runs; RBI = Runs batted in

Pos	Player	G	AB	H	Avg.	HR	RBI
C	Dave Pierson	57	233	55	.236	0	13
1B	Charlie Gould	61	258	65	.252	0	11
2B	Charlie Sweasy	56	225	46	.204	0	10
3B	Will Foley	58	221	50	.226	0	9
SS	Henry Kessler	59	248	64	.258	0	11
OF	Charley Jones	64	276	79	.286	4	38
OF	Redleg Snyder	55	205	31	.151	0	12
OF	Bobby Clack	32	118	19	.161	0	5

==== Other batters ====
- Note: G = Games played; AB = At bats; H = Hits; Avg. = Batting average; HR = Home runs; RBI = Runs batted in

Player	G	AB	H	Avg.	HR	RBI
Amos Booth	63	272	71	.261	0	14
Sam Field	4	14	0	.000	0	0

=== Pitching ===
==== Starting pitchers ====
- Note: G = Games pitched; IP = Innings pitched; W = Wins; L = Losses; ERA = Earned run average; SO = Strikeouts

Player	G	IP	W	L	ERA	SO
Dory Dean	30	262.2	4	26	3.73	22
Cherokee Fisher	28	229.1	4	20	3.02	29
Dale Williams	9	83.0	1	8	4.23	9
Dave Pierson	1	0.0	0	1	inf	0

==== Other pitchers ====
- Note: G = Games pitched; IP = Innings pitched; W = Wins; L = Losses; ERA = Earned run average; SO = Strikeouts

Player	G	IP	W	L	ERA	SO
Amos Booth	3	9.2	0	1	9.31	0

==== Relief pitchers ====
- Note: G = Games pitched; W = Wins; L = Losses; SV = Saves; ERA = Earned run average; SO = Strikeouts

Player	G	W	L	SV	ERA	SO
Charlie Gould	2	0	0	0	0.00	0
Bobby Clack	1	0	0	0	4.50	0
