= 1876 St. Louis Brown Stockings season =

1876 St. Louis Brown Stockings
- League: National League
- Ballpark: Sportsman's Park
- City: St. Louis, Missouri
- Record: 45–19 (.703)
- League place: 3rd
- Owner: C. O. Bishop
- Managers: Mase Graffen, George McManus

The St. Louis Brown Stockings joined the newly formed National League as a charter member in 1876. Although both St. Louis and Hartford finished the season 6 games behind the pennant-winning Chicago White Stockings, the Brown Stockings were officially the third place team as, in 1877, the standings were determined by number of wins, not games behind. As Hartford had 47 wins and St. Louis only had 45, Hartford finished in second and St. Louis finished in third. Nonetheless, St. Louis had won its season series against Chicago 6 games to 4 – winning all of its season series against all National League opponents. Due to the politics between the teams at the time, an unofficial five-game post-season was created between those two teams to determine the "Championship of the West." St. Louis won the series 4 games to 1. According to Stathead, the 1876 Brown Stockings hold the lowest single-season team earned run average (ERA) in MLB history (1.22).

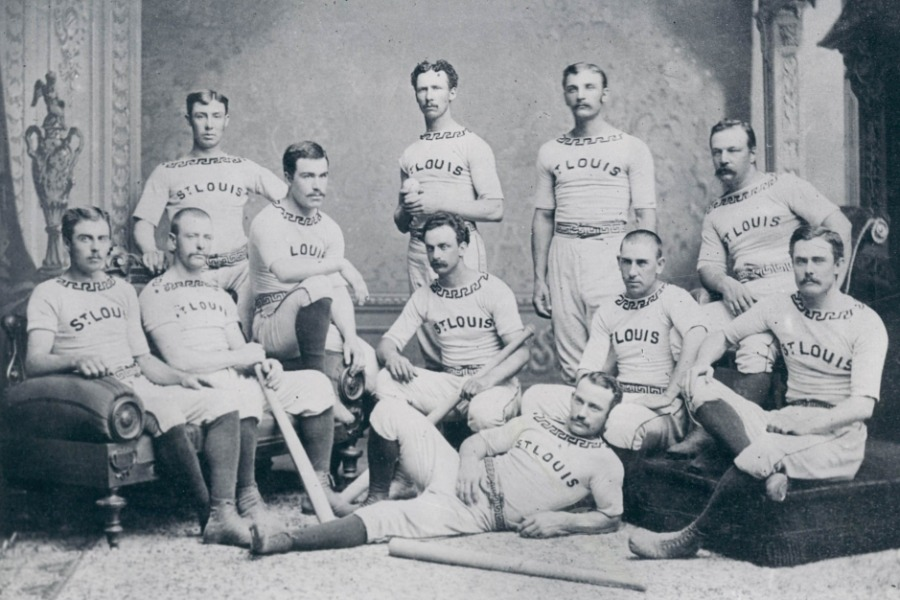
Team photograph

== Regular season ==
=== Season standings ===
National League
| Team | W | L | Pct. | GB | Home | Road |
|---|---|---|---|---|---|---|
| Chicago White Stockings | 52 | 14 | .788 | — | 25‍–‍6 | 27‍–‍8 |
| Hartford Dark Blues | 47 | 21 | .691 | 6 | 23‍–‍9 | 24‍–‍12 |
| St. Louis Brown Stockings | 45 | 19 | .703 | 6 | 24‍–‍6 | 21‍–‍13 |
| Boston Red Caps | 39 | 31 | .557 | 15 | 19‍–‍17 | 20‍–‍14 |
| Louisville Grays | 30 | 36 | .455 | 22 | 15‍–‍16 | 15‍–‍20 |
| New York Mutuals | 21 | 35 | .375 | 26 | 13‍–‍20 | 8‍–‍15 |
| Philadelphia Athletics | 14 | 45 | .237 | 34½ | 10‍–‍24 | 4‍–‍21 |
| Cincinnati Reds | 9 | 56 | .138 | 42½ | 6‍–‍24 | 3‍–‍32 |

=== Record vs. opponents ===
1876 National League record Sources:
| Team | BSN | CHI | CIN | HAR | LOU | NYM | PHN | STL |
|---|---|---|---|---|---|---|---|---|
| Boston | — | 1–9 | 10–0 | 2–8 | 5–5 | 8–2 | 9–1 | 4–6 |
| Chicago | 9–1 | — | 10–0 | 6–4 | 9–1 | 7–1 | 7–1 | 4–6 |
| Cincinnati | 0–10 | 0–10 | — | 1–9 | 2–8 | 1–7 | 3–5 | 2–7 |
| Hartford | 8–2 | 4–6 | 9–1 | — | 9–1–1 | 4–4 | 9–1 | 4–6 |
| Louisville | 5–5 | 1–9 | 8–2 | 1–9–1 | — | 5–3–1 | 6–2–1 | 4–6 |
| New York | 2–8 | 1–7 | 7–1 | 4–4 | 3–5–1 | — | 3–4 | 1–6 |
| Philadelphia | 1–9 | 1–7 | 5–3 | 1–9 | 2–6–1 | 4–3 | — | 0–8 |
| St. Louis | 6–4 | 6–4 | 7–2 | 6–4 | 6–4 | 6–1 | 8–0 | — |

=== Roster ===
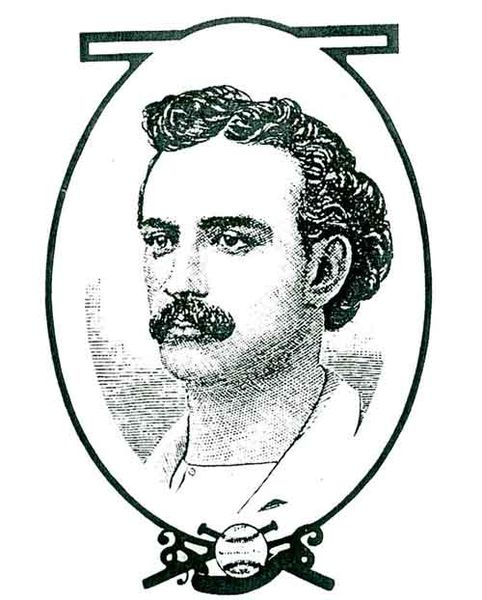
Lip Pike

1876 St. Louis Brown Stockings
Roster
| Pitchers: George Bradley; Catchers: John Clapp | Infielders: Joe Battin; Herman Dehlman; Denny Mack; Mike McGeary; Dickey Pearce | Outfielders: Joe Blong; Ned Cuthbert; Lip Pike | Manager: Mase Graffen; George McManus |

== Player stats ==
=== Batting ===
==== Starters by position ====
Note: Pos = Position; G = Games played; AB = At bats; H = Hits; Avg. = Batting average; HR = Home runs; RBI = Runs batted in

| Pos | Player | G | AB | H | Avg. | HR | RBI |
|---|---|---|---|---|---|---|---|
| C | John Clapp | 64 | 298 | 91 | .305 | 0 | 29 |
| 1B | Herman Dehlman | 64 | 245 | 45 | .184 | 0 | 9 |
| 2B | Mike McGeary | 61 | 276 | 72 | .261 | 0 | 30 |
| 3B | Joe Battin | 64 | 283 | 85 | .300 | 0 | 46 |
| SS | Denny Mack | 48 | 180 | 39 | .217 | 1 | 7 |
| OF | Ned Cuthbert | 63 | 283 | 70 | .247 | 0 | 25 |
| OF | Joe Blong | 62 | 264 | 62 | .235 | 0 | 30 |
| OF | Lip Pike | 63 | 282 | 91 | .323 | 1 | 50 |

==== Other batters ====
Note: G = Games played; AB = At bats; H = Hits; Avg. = Batting average; HR = Home runs; RBI = Runs batted in

| Player | G | AB | H | Avg. | HR | RBI |
|---|---|---|---|---|---|---|
| Dickey Pearce | 25 | 102 | 21 | .206 | 0 | 10 |

=== Pitching ===
==== Starting pitchers ====
Note: G = Games pitched; IP = Innings pitched; W = Wins; L = Losses; ERA = Earned run average; SO = Strikeouts

| Player | G | IP | W | L | ERA | SO |
|---|---|---|---|---|---|---|
| George Bradley | 64 | 573.0 | 45 | 19 | 1.23 | 103 |

==== Relief pitchers ====
Note: G = Games pitched; W = Wins; L = Losses; SV = Saves; ERA = Earned run average; SO = Strikeouts

| Player | G | W | L | SV | ERA | SO |
|---|---|---|---|---|---|---|
| Joe Blong | 1 | 0 | 0 | 0 | 0.00 | 0 |
