= Fred Andrus =

American baseball player (1850–1937)

- Outfielder/Pitcher
- Born: August 23, 1850; Washington, Michigan, U.S.
- Died: November 10, 1937 (aged 87); Detroit, Michigan, U.S.
- Batted: Right Threw: Right

MLB debut
- July 25, 1876, for the Chicago White Stockings

Last MLB appearance
- July 4, 1884, for the Chicago White Stockings

MLB statistics
- Batting average: .293
- Hits: 12
- Runs batted in: 2
- Win–loss record: 1–0
- Earned run average: 2.00
- Strikeouts: 2
- Stats at Baseball Reference

Teams
- Chicago White Stockings (1876), (1884)

Frederick Hotham Andrus (August 23, 1850 – November 10, 1937) was an American outfielder and pitcher in Major League Baseball for the Chicago White Stockings. In 1876 he played 8 games in the outfield, batting .306 in 36 at bats. In 1884, he played one game, pitching a complete game win on July 4 against the Philadelphia Quakers, allowing two earned runs.

He previously played for a club in Jackson, Michigan, called the Mutuals in 1875, while working for a newspaper. After playing for the White Stocking in 1876, he played for a Milwaukee team in 1877, and stayed there to work as a clerk in a book store. He moved to Chicago in 1884 to be the treasurer for Albert Spalding's sporting goods company, a position he held for eight years. He joined David Whitney Jr.'s real estate company in Detroit, later managing his estate until his death of pneumonia at the age of 87. He was initially interred at Woodlawn Cemetery in Detroit, but was later re-interred at Oak Woods Cemetery in Chicago.
