= 1876 Louisville Grays season =

1876 Louisville Grays
- League: National League
- Ballpark: Louisville Baseball Park
- City: Louisville, Kentucky
- Record: 30–36 (.455)
- League place: 5th
- Owners: Walter N. Haldeman, Charles Chase
- Manager: Jack Chapman

The Louisville Grays were formed prior to the 1876 Major League Baseball season and joined the just formed National League as a charter member. They finished in fifth place in their debut season under manager Jack Chapman.

== Regular season ==
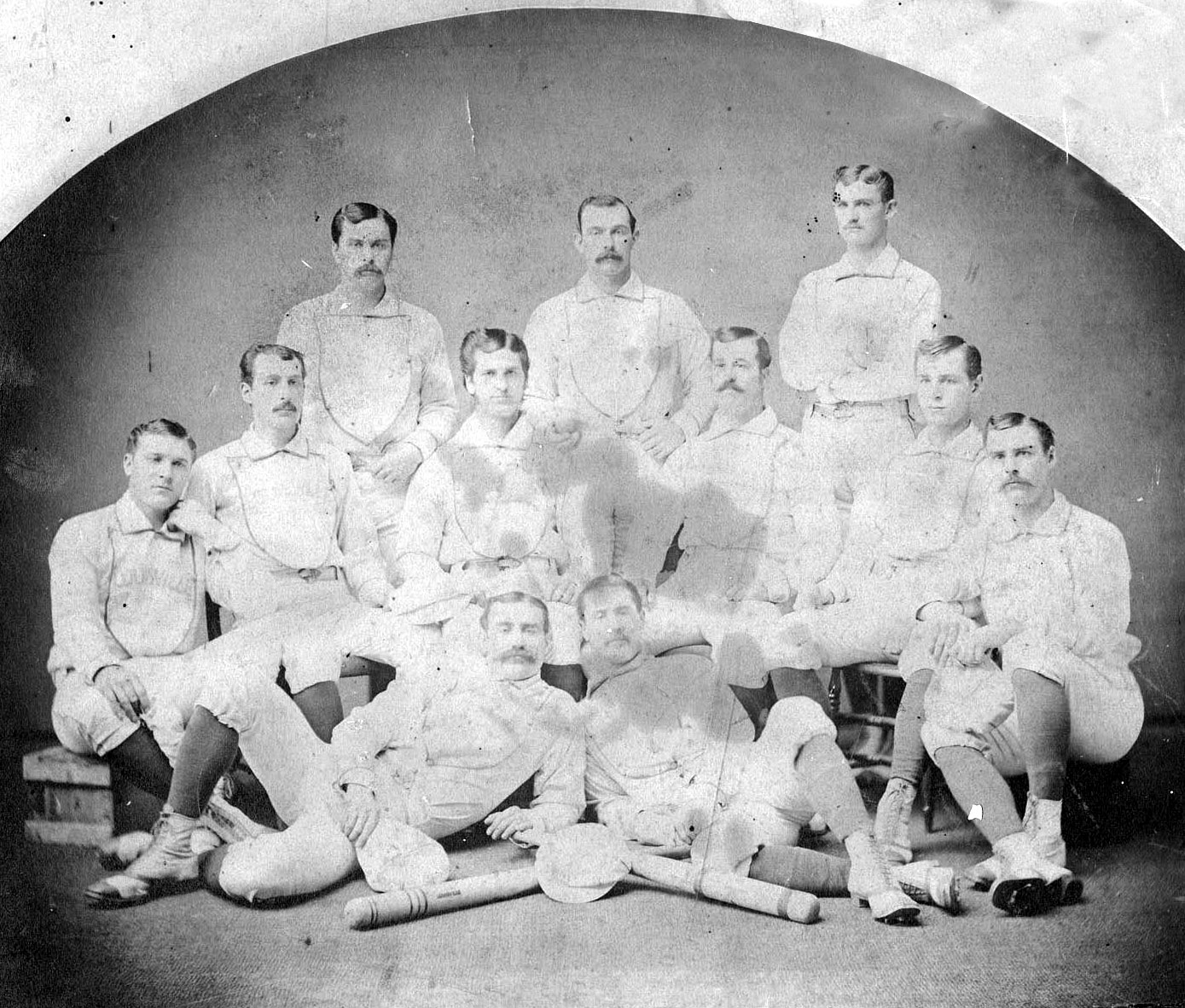
1876 Louisville Grays

=== Season standings ===
National League
Team	W	L	Pct.	GB	Home	Road
Chicago White Stockings	52	14	.788	—	25‍–‍6	27‍–‍8
Hartford Dark Blues	47	21	.691	6	23‍–‍9	24‍–‍12
St. Louis Brown Stockings	45	19	.703	6	24‍–‍6	21‍–‍13
Boston Red Caps	39	31	.557	15	19‍–‍17	20‍–‍14
Louisville Grays	30	36	.455	22	15‍–‍16	15‍–‍20
New York Mutuals	21	35	.375	26	13‍–‍20	8‍–‍15
Philadelphia Athletics	14	45	.237	34½	10‍–‍24	4‍–‍21
Cincinnati Reds	9	56	.138	42½	6‍–‍24	3‍–‍32

=== Record vs. opponents ===
1876 National League record Sources:
Team	BSN	CHI	CIN	HAR	LOU	NYM	PHN	STL
Boston	—	1–9	10–0	2–8	5–5	8–2	9–1	4–6
Chicago	9–1	—	10–0	6–4	9–1	7–1	7–1	4–6
Cincinnati	0–10	0–10	—	1–9	2–8	1–7	3–5	2–7
Hartford	8–2	4–6	9–1	—	9–1–1	4–4	9–1	4–6
Louisville	5–5	1–9	8–2	1–9–1	—	5–3–1	6–2–1	4–6
New York	2–8	1–7	7–1	4–4	3–5–1	—	3–4	1–6
Philadelphia	1–9	1–7	5–3	1–9	2–6–1	4–3	—	0–8
St. Louis	6–4	6–4	7–2	6–4	6–4	6–1	8–0	—

=== Roster ===
1876 Louisville Grays
Roster
Pitchers: Jim Devlin; Frank Pearce; Catchers: Bill Holbert; Pop Snyder	Infielders: John Carbine; Chick Fulmer; Joe Gerhardt; Bill Hague; Ed Somerville	Outfielders: Art Allison; George Bechtel; Jack Chapman; Jim Clinton; Dan Collins; Scott Hastings; Johnny Ryan	Manager: Jack Chapman

== Player stats ==
=== Batting ===
==== Starters by position ====
Note: Pos = Position; G = Games played; AB = At bats; H = Hits; Avg. = Batting average; HR = Home runs; RBI = Runs batted in

Pos	Player	G	AB	H	Avg.	HR	RBI
C	Pop Snyder	56	224	44	.196	1	9
1B	Joe Gerhardt	65	292	76	.260	2	18
2B	Ed Somerville	64	256	48	.188	0	14
3B	Bill Hague	67	294	78	.265	1	22
SS	Chick Fulmer	66	267	73	.273	1	29
OF	Scott Hastings	67	283	73	.258	0	21
OF	Johnny Ryan	64	241	61	.253	1	18
OF	Art Allison	31	130	27	.208	0	10

==== Other batters ====
Note: G = Games played; AB = At bats; H = Hits; Avg. = Batting average; HR = Home runs; RBI = Runs batted in

Player	G	AB	H	Avg.	HR	RBI
Jack Chapman	17	67	16	.239	0	5
Jim Clinton	16	65	22	.338	0	0
George Bechtel	14	55	10	.182	0	2
Bill Holbert	12	43	11	.256	0	5
Dan Collins	7	28	4	.143	0	9
John Carbine	7	25	4	.160	0	1

=== Pitching ===
==== Starting pitchers ====
Note: G = Games pitched; IP = Innings pitched; W = Wins; L = Losses; ERA = Earned run average; SO = Strikeouts

Player	G	IP	W	L	ERA	SO
Jim Devlin	68	622.0	30	35	1.56	122
Jim Clinton	1	9.0	0	1	6.00	1

==== Relief pitchers ====
Note: G = Games pitched; W = Wins; L = Losses; SV = Saves; ERA = Earned run average; SO = Strikeouts

Player	G	W	L	SV	ERA	SO
Johnny Ryan	1	0	0	0	5.63	1
Frank Pearce	1	0	0	0	4.50	1
