= George Seward =

George Seward may refer to:

- George Seward (diplomat) (1840–1910), American diplomat to China
- George Seward (baseball) (1851–1904), American baseball player
