= Robert Valentine =

Robert Valentine may refer to:

- Bob Valentine (referee) (born 1939), football referee
- Bob Valentine (footballer) (1877–1926), rugby league and football (soccer) player
- Bob Valentine (baseball), baseball player
- Bobby Valentine (born 1950), baseball player and manager
- Rob Valentine (born 1950), mayor
- Rob Valentine (rugby) (1941–2024), rugby union and rugby league footballer
- Robert Valentine (composer) (c. 1671 – 1747), Anglo-Italian composer
- Bob Valentine (speedway rider) (1940–2026), Australian speedway rider

== See also ==
- Bobby Valentino (British musician) (born 1954), singer, violinist, actor
