= National game =

National game may refer to:

- National sport, a game or sport considered intrinsic to a culture or nation
- America's National Game, a book by Albert Spalding
- National Games Week, an annual event occurring on Thanksgiving week in the US
- National Bingo Game, a bingo game using preselected numbers played in bingo halls in the UK, run by the National Bingo Game Association
- National Game XI, a squad of players selected as the best representative of the football pyramid system below the Football League in England
