= Frank Whitney =

Frank Whitney may refer to:

- Frank DeArmon Whitney (born 1959), United States federal judge
- Frank Whitney (baseball) (1856–1943), American Major League Baseball player
