= Dory Dean =

American baseball player (1852–1935)

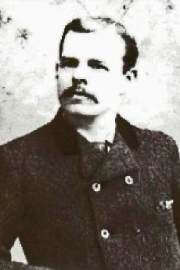
- Pitcher
- Born: November 6, 1852; Cincinnati, Ohio
- Died: May 4, 1935 (aged 82); Nashville, Tennessee
- Batted: Right Threw: Right

MLB debut
- June 22, 1876, for the Cincinnati Reds

Last MLB appearance
- October 9, 1876, for the Cincinnati Reds

MLB statistics
- Win–loss record: 4-26
- Earned run average: 3.73
- Strikeouts: 22
- Stats at Baseball Reference

Teams
- Cincinnati Reds (1876)

Charles Wilson "Dory" Dean (November 6, 1852 – May 4, 1935) was an American, 19th century Major League Baseball player from Cincinnati, Ohio. He was a right-handed pitcher who played for just one Major League season, the 1876 Cincinnati Reds.

== Career ==
Dory began playing in Cincinnati when the famous Red Stockings left town after the 1870 season. He had been working as an engineer as well, but the vacuum that was left in the local baseball community after the Red Stockings' departure allowed for the young talent in the area to develop their skills. Dory was one of these ballplayers. In 1876, having previously played for the local minor league Blue Stockings in 1875. he was signed to play for the Reds to help support the pitching staff that had only Cherokee Fisher at the time. After a 4–21 start to the season, they gave Dean a chance to pitch and he did well, even though it resulted in another loss. Fisher was given another start, which he lost, and was given his release from the team. This left Dean as the lone pitcher on the team.

After Dean had made seventeen straight starts, the last thirteen of them losses, another local product, Dale Williams, was brought in to pitch. Williams made nine starts, but the result was just as disastrous. Dean was again instituted as the starting pitcher for the remainder of the season. He finished the year with a 4–26 record for a club that compiled a 9–56 mark.

It was during this long losing streak that Dory began using an unusual pitching motion in an attempt to gain an advantage over the hitters. During his delivery to the plate, he would twist around on his foot to where his back was facing the batter before he threw the ball. Other pitchers began to deliver the ball in the same fashion, such as Harold Ernst and John Montgomery Ward. Ward claimed he learned it from Ernst. The style was officially outlawed after the 1878 season, presumably to stop Ward from having an unfair advantage. The rule was later discarded, and pitchers began to use it again, such as John Clarkson, Cy Young, and later in the 20th century, Luis Tiant.

== Post-career ==
After his baseball career he became an electrotyper, eventually founding Dixie Electrotype Company in Nashville, Tennessee and played tennis at a high level for the remainder of his life. Dory died in Nashville at the age of 82, and is interred at Woodlawn Cemetery.
