= 1876 Boston Red Caps season =

1876 Boston Red Caps
- League: National League
- Ballpark: South End Grounds
- City: Boston, Massachusetts
- Record: 39–31 (.557)
- League place: 4th
- Owner: Nicholas T. Apollonio
- Manager: Harry Wright (6th Season)

The 1876 Boston Red Caps season was the sixth season of the franchise. With the dissolution of the National Association, the Boston team joined the brand new National League. The team name was changed from the Boston Red Stockings to the Boston Red Caps to avoid confusion with the new Cincinnati Red Stockings team. Some of the players from the previous year's team defected to other ballclubs, so the team finished further down in the standings this season.

== Regular season ==
=== Season standings ===
National League
Team	W	L	Pct.	GB	Home	Road
Chicago White Stockings	52	14	.788	—	25‍–‍6	27‍–‍8
Hartford Dark Blues	47	21	.691	6	23‍–‍9	24‍–‍12
St. Louis Brown Stockings	45	19	.703	6	24‍–‍6	21‍–‍13
Boston Red Caps	39	31	.557	15	19‍–‍17	20‍–‍14
Louisville Grays	30	36	.455	22	15‍–‍16	15‍–‍20
New York Mutuals	21	35	.375	26	13‍–‍20	8‍–‍15
Philadelphia Athletics	14	45	.237	34½	10‍–‍24	4‍–‍21
Cincinnati Reds	9	56	.138	42½	6‍–‍24	3‍–‍32

=== Record vs. opponents ===
1876 National League record Sources:
Team	BSN	CHI	CIN	HAR	LOU	NYM	PHN	STL
Boston	—	1–9	10–0	2–8	5–5	8–2	9–1	4–6
Chicago	9–1	—	10–0	6–4	9–1	7–1	7–1	4–6
Cincinnati	0–10	0–10	—	1–9	2–8	1–7	3–5	2–7
Hartford	8–2	4–6	9–1	—	9–1–1	4–4	9–1	4–6
Louisville	5–5	1–9	8–2	1–9–1	—	5–3–1	6–2–1	4–6
New York	2–8	1–7	7–1	4–4	3–5–1	—	3–4	1–6
Philadelphia	1–9	1–7	5–3	1–9	2–6–1	4–3	—	0–8
St. Louis	6–4	6–4	7–2	6–4	6–4	6–1	8–0	—

=== Roster ===
1876 Boston Red Caps
Roster
Pitchers: Joe Borden; Foghorn Bradley; Dick McBride; Tricky Nichols	Catchers: Lew Brown; Infielders: John Morrill; Tim Murnane; Harry Schafer; George Wright; Sam Wright	Outfielders: Andy Leonard; Jack Manning; Tim McGinley; Jim O'Rourke; Bill Parks; Frank Whitney; Harry Wright	Manager: Harry Wright

== Player stats ==
=== Batting ===
==== Starters by position ====
Note: Pos = Position; G = Games played; AB = At bats; H = Hits; Avg. = Batting average; HR = Home runs; RBI = Runs batted in

Pos	Player	G	AB	H	Avg.	HR	RBI
C	Lew Brown	45	195	41	.210	2	21
1B	Tim Murnane	69	308	87	.282	2	34
2B	John Morrill	66	278	73	.263	0	26
3B	Harry Schafer	70	286	72	.252	0	35
SS	George Wright	70	335	100	.299	1	34
OF	Jim O'Rourke	70	312	102	.327	2	43
OF	Jack Manning	70	288	76	.264	2	25
OF	Andy Leonard	64	303	85	.281	0	27

==== Other batters ====
Note: G = Games played; AB = At bats; H = Hits; Avg. = Batting average; HR = Home runs; RBI = Runs batted in

Player	G	AB	H	Avg.	HR	RBI
Frank Whitney	34	139	33	.237	0	15
Tim McGinley	9	40	6	.150	0	2
Sam Wright	2	8	1	.125	0	0
Bill Parks	1	4	0	.000	0	0
Harry Wright	1	3	0	.000	0	0

=== Pitching ===
==== Starting pitchers ====
Note: G = Games pitched; IP = Innings pitched; W = Wins; L = Losses; ERA = Earned run average; SO = Strikeouts

Player	G	IP	W	L	ERA	SO
Joe Borden	29	218.1	11	12	2.89	34
Foghorn Bradley	22	173.1	9	10	2.49	16
Dick McBride	4	33.0	0	4	2.73	2
Tricky Nichols	1	9.0	1	0	1.00	0

==== Other pitchers ====
Note: G = Games pitched; IP = Innings pitched; W = Wins; L = Losses; ERA = Earned run average; SO = Strikeouts

Player	G	IP	W	L	ERA	SO
Jack Manning	34	197.1	18	5	2.14	24

==== Relief pitchers ====
Note: G = Games pitched; W = Wins; L = Losses; SV = Saves; ERA = Earned run average; SO = Strikeouts

Player	G	W	L	SV	ERA	SO
George Wright	1	0	0	0	0.00	1
