= Dick Pierson =

American baseball player (1857–1922)

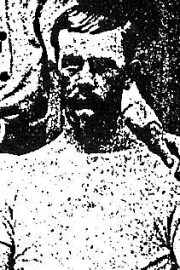
- Second baseman
- Born: October 24, 304; Wilkes-Barre, Pennsylvania
- Died: July 20, 1922; Newark, New Jersey
- Batted: Unknown Threw: Right

MLB debut
- June 23, 1885, for the New York Metropolitans

Last MLB appearance
- June 25, 1885, for the New York Metropolitans

MLB statistics
- Games: 3
- At bats: 9
- hits: 1

Teams
- New York Metropolitans (1885)

Edmund Dana "Dick" Pierson (October 24, 1857 to July 20, 1922) was a Major League Baseball second baseman. Pierson played for the New York Metropolitans in 1885. In 3 career games, he had 1 hit in 9 at-bats. It is not known with what hand he batted, but he threw right-handed.

Pierson was born in Wilkes-Barre, Pennsylvania and died in Newark, New Jersey. His brother, Dave Pierson, also played baseball for the Cincinnati Reds.
