= George Fair =

American baseball player (1856–1939)

- Second baseman
- Born: January 13, 1856; Boston, Massachusetts, U.S.
- Died: February 12, 1939 (aged 83); Roslindale, Massachusetts, U.S.
- Batted: Unknown Threw: Unknown

MLB debut
- July 29, 1876, for the New York Mutuals

Last MLB appearance
- July 29, 1876, for the New York Mutuals

MLB statistics
- Games played: 1
- Runs scored: 0
- Hits: 0
- Batting average: .000
- Stats at Baseball Reference

Teams
- New York Mutuals (1876)

George T. Fair (January 13, 1856 – February 12, 1939) was an American Major League Baseball second baseman who played one game for the New York Mutuals in 1876. The twenty-year-old Fair failed to get a hit in four at-bats in his lone big-league contest on July 29, then was dropped by the club. Subsequently, he played for the Rhode Islands of the New England League, making his last professional baseball appearance in 1877. Born in Boston, Fair died in Roslindale, Massachusetts in 1939 at the age of 83. At the time of his death, Fair was the last living member of the Mutuals National League franchise, which was expelled from the NL after the 1876 season.

The first baseball encyclopedia, Hy Turkin and S. C. Thompson's Complete Encyclopedia of Baseball (first published in 1951), did not list Fair. Instead, his brief accomplishments were credited to Edward L. Thayer; coincidentally, a player named Edward Thayer played in the minor leagues from 1885 to 1892. Later references rectified this error, and Fair was given his rightful place in baseball history. (Whoever came up with Fair's pseudonym may have been thinking of the real Edward Thayer, or perhaps Ernest Thayer, author of the famous baseball poem Casey at the Bat.)
