= Tricky Nichols =

American baseball player (1850–1897)

- Pitcher
- Born: July 26, 1850; Bridgeport, Connecticut, U.S.
- Died: August 22, 1897 (aged 47); Bridgeport, Connecticut, U.S.
- Batted: Right Threw: Right

MLB debut
- April 19, 1875, for the New Haven Elm Citys

Last MLB appearance
- July 11, 1882, for the Baltimore Orioles

MLB statistics
- Games played: 125
- Win–loss record: 28–73
- Earned run average: 3.26
- Stats at Baseball Reference

Teams
- New Haven Elm Citys (1875); Boston Red Caps (1876); St. Louis Brown Stockings (1877); Providence Grays (1878); Worcester Ruby Legs (1880); Baltimore Orioles (1882)

Frederick C. "Tricky" Nichols (July 26, 1850 – August 22, 1897) was an American pitcher in Major League Baseball for six seasons from 1875 to 1882. He played for six teams: New Haven Elm Citys in 1875, Boston Red Caps in 1876, St. Louis Brown Stockings in 1877, Providence Grays in 1878, Worcester Ruby Legs in 1880, and Baltimore Orioles in 1882. He died in his hometown of Bridgeport, Connecticut at the age of 47, and is interred at Lakeview Cemetery.
