= Pete Treacey =

American baseball player

- Shortstop
- Born: c. 1852; Brooklyn, New York
- Died: Unknown
- Batted: Unknown Threw: Unknown

MLB debut
- August 5, 1876, for the New York Mutuals

Last MLB appearance
- 1876, for the New York Mutuals

MLB statistics
- Games played: 2
- Runs scored: 1
- Hits: 0
- Batting average: .000
- Stats at Baseball Reference

Teams
- New York Mutuals (1876)

Peter Treacey was a professional baseball player who played shortstop in Major League Baseball in two games for the 1876 New York Mutuals. He played college ball at Fordham University. His brother, Fred Treacey, also played for the 1876 Mutuals.
