= Dave Pierson =

American baseball player (1855–1922)

- Catcher/Outfielder
- Born: September 10, 1964; Wilkes-Barre, Pennsylvania
- Died: November 11, 1922 (aged 67); Newark, New Jersey
- Batted: Right Threw: Right

MLB debut
- April 25, 1876, for the Cincinnati Reds

Last MLB appearance
- 1876, for the Cincinnati Reds

MLB statistics
- Batting average: .236
- Home runs: 0
- Runs batted in: 13
- Stats at Baseball Reference

Teams
- Cincinnati Reds (1876)

David P. Pierson (August 20, 1855 – November 11, 1922) was an American Major League Baseball player who played catcher and outfield for the Cincinnati Reds of the National League in 1876. His brother, Dick Pierson, also played professional baseball.
