= Jim Shanley =

American baseball player (1854–1904)

- Outfielder
- Born: May 4, 1854; Brooklyn, New York
- Died: November 4, 1904 (aged 50); Brooklyn, New York
- Batted: Unknown Threw: Unknown

MLB debut
- May 3, 1876, for the New York Mutuals

Last MLB appearance
- May 4, 1876, for the New York Mutuals

MLB statistics
- Games played: 2
- At bats: 8
- Hits: 1
- Stats at Baseball Reference

Teams
- New York Mutuals (1876)

James H. Shanley (May 4, 1854 – November 4, 1904) was an American Major League Baseball outfielder. Shanley played two games for the 1876 New York Mutuals, and had one hit in eight at bats. Shanley died at the age of 50 in his hometown of Brooklyn, New York, and is interred at Calvary Cemetery in Woodside, Queens, New York.
