= John Hayes (baseball) =

American baseball player (1855–1904)

- Left fielder
- Born: January 1855; New York, New York
- Died: May 25, 1904 (aged 49); New York, New York
- Batted: Unknown Threw: Unknown

MLB debut
- September 9, 1876, for the New York Mutuals

Last MLB appearance
- September 16, 1876, for the New York Mutuals

MLB statistics
- Games played: 5
- Runs scored: 1
- Hits: 3
- Batting average: .143

Teams
- New York Mutuals (1876)

John Edward Hayes (1855–1904) was a Major League Baseball left fielder. He played for the New York Mutuals in 1876. He later attended law school at Columbia University.
