= Ned Cuthbert =

American baseball player (1845–1905)

- Outfielder
- Born: June 20, 1845; Philadelphia, Pennsylvania, U.S.
- Died: February 16, 1905 (aged 59); St. Louis, Missouri, U.S.
- Batted: Right Threw: Right

MLB debut
- May 20, 1871, for the Philadelphia Athletics

Last MLB appearance
- September 4, 1884, for the Baltimore Monumentals

MLB statistics
- Batting average: .254
- Home runs: 8
- Runs batted in: 182
- Stats at Baseball Reference

Teams
- National Association of Base Ball Players: Keystone of Philadelphia (1865–1866); West Philadelphia (1867); Philadelphia Athletics (1867–1869); Chicago White Stockings (1870); League player: Philadelphia Athletics (1871–1872); Philadelphia White Stockings (1873); Chicago White Stockings (1874); St. Louis Brown Stockings (1875–1876); Cincinnati Reds (1877); St. Louis Browns (1882–1883); Baltimore Monumentals (1884); League manager: St. Louis Browns (1882)

Edgar Edward Cuthbert (June 20, 1845 – February 6, 1905) was an American professional baseball outfielder.

== Career ==
Cuthbert's baseball career began in 1865 with the Keystone Club of Philadelphia. After two seasons as a second baseman and outfielder with the Keystones, he moved across town to the West Philadelphia club, playing only four games for them before joining the Philadelphia Athletics. With Cuthbert, the Athletics won national championships in 1867 and 1868. A solid batsman and outfielder, Ned jumped to the Chicago White Stockings in 1870.

Cuthbert was with a number of teams in the National Association and its successor, the National League, playing in Philadelphia, Chicago, St. Louis, and Cincinnati.

After game-fixing allegations surfaced as part of the Brown Stockings 1877 season, Brown Stockings ownership officially withdrew from the National League and folded the team. In time for the 1878 season, Cuthbert and four other former players of the Brown Stockings spent the next few years (1878–1881) playing as a reorganized, semi-professional baseball team, filling vacant positions with the best of the St. Louis amateur players. Cuthbert played with the semi-professional Brown Stockings (1878, 1879, and 1881) and the St. Louis Red Stockings (1880). It was Cuthbert who, while working at his saloon during these years, convinced grocery and saloon owner Chris von der Ahe to invest in the Brown Stockings and return them to professional baseball status. Von der Ahe purchased the Brown Stockings in 1880, changed their name to the Browns, and returned them to professional status in 1882.

In 1882, Cuthbert became the player/manager for the St. Louis team of the newly formed American Association. The following year, he relinquished the managerial duties but continued with the Brown Stockings as a player before jumping to the Baltimore Monumentals of the ill-fated Union Association in 1884, his final season.

Reportedly, Cuthbert stole the first base in organized baseball in 1865 while playing for the Philadelphia Keystones, simply by waiting for the pitcher to be distracted and running from first to second base. However, according to Peter Morris' "A Game Of Inches", base-stealing was part of baseball well before 1865; the earliest explicit account of stealing a base goes back to 1856.

Cuthbert died of endocarditis in St. Louis, Missouri, and was laid to rest at Bellefontaine Cemetery.

== See also ==
- List of Major League Baseball player-managers
- List of Major League Baseball annual stolen base leaders
