= 1876 Chicago White Stockings season =

1876 Chicago White Stockings
- National League champions
- League: National League
- Ballpark: 23rd Street Grounds
- City: Chicago
- Record: 52–14 (.788)
- League place: 1st
- Owner: William Hulbert
- Manager: Albert Spalding

The 1876 Chicago White Stockings season was the fifth season of the Chicago White Stockings franchise, the first in the National League and the third at 23rd Street Grounds. The White Stockings, as one of the founding members of the new National League, won the NL's initial championship during this season with a record of 52–14.

== Regular season ==
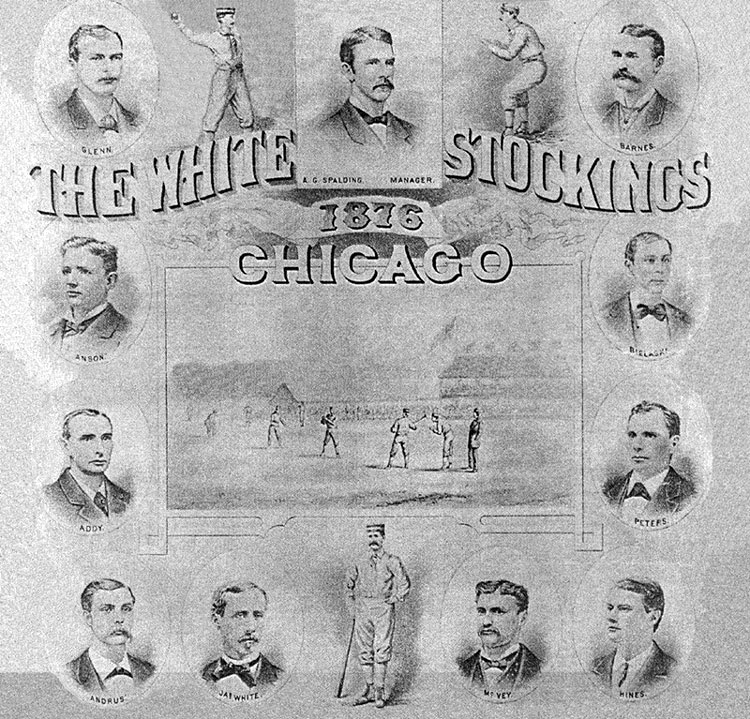
The 1876 Chicago White Stockings

=== Season standings ===
National League
Team	W	L	Pct.	GB	Home	Road
Chicago White Stockings	52	14	.788	—	25‍–‍6	27‍–‍8
Hartford Dark Blues	47	21	.691	6	23‍–‍9	24‍–‍12
St. Louis Brown Stockings	45	19	.703	6	24‍–‍6	21‍–‍13
Boston Red Caps	39	31	.557	15	19‍–‍17	20‍–‍14
Louisville Grays	30	36	.455	22	15‍–‍16	15‍–‍20
New York Mutuals	21	35	.375	26	13‍–‍20	8‍–‍15
Philadelphia Athletics	14	45	.237	34½	10‍–‍24	4‍–‍21
Cincinnati Reds	9	56	.138	42½	6‍–‍24	3‍–‍32

=== Record vs. opponents ===
1876 National League record Sources:
Team	BSN	CHI	CIN	HAR	LOU	NYM	PHN	STL
Boston	—	1–9	10–0	2–8	5–5	8–2	9–1	4–6
Chicago	9–1	—	10–0	6–4	9–1	7–1	7–1	4–6
Cincinnati	0–10	0–10	—	1–9	2–8	1–7	3–5	2–7
Hartford	8–2	4–6	9–1	—	9–1–1	4–4	9–1	4–6
Louisville	5–5	1–9	8–2	1–9–1	—	5–3–1	6–2–1	4–6
New York	2–8	1–7	7–1	4–4	3–5–1	—	3–4	1–6
Philadelphia	1–9	1–7	5–3	1–9	2–6–1	4–3	—	0–8
St. Louis	6–4	6–4	7–2	6–4	6–4	6–1	8–0	—

=== Roster ===
1876 Chicago White Stockings
Roster
Pitchers: Al Spalding; Catchers: Deacon White	Infielders: Cap Anson; Ross Barnes; Cal McVey; John Peters	Outfielders: Bob Addy; Fred Andrus; Oscar Bielaski; John Glenn; Paul Hines	Manager: Albert Spalding

== Player stats ==
=== Batting ===
==== Starters by position ====
Note: Pos = Position; G = Games played; AB = At bats; H = Hits; Avg. = Batting average; HR = Home runs; RBI = Runs batted in

Pos	Player	G	AB	H	Avg.	HR	RBI
C	Deacon White	66	303	104	.343	1	60
1B	Cal McVey	63	308	107	.347	1	53
2B	Ross Barnes	66	322	138	.429	1	59
3B	Cap Anson	66	309	110	.356	2	59
SS	John Peters	66	316	111	.351	1	47
OF	Paul Hines	64	305	101	.331	2	59
OF	John Glenn	66	276	84	.304	0	32
OF	Bob Addy	32	142	40	.282	0	16

==== Other batters ====
Note: G = Games played; AB = At bats; H = Hits; Avg. = Batting average; HR = Home runs; RBI = Runs batted in

Player	G	AB	H	Avg.	HR	RBI
Oscar Bielaski	32	139	29	.209	0	10
Fred Andrus	8	36	11	.306	0	2

=== Pitching ===
==== Starting pitchers ====
Note: G = Games pitched; IP = Innings pitched; W = Wins; L = Losses; ERA = Earned run average; SO = Strikeouts

Player	G	IP	W	L	ERA	SO
Albert Spalding	61	528.2	47	12	1.75	39

==== Other pitchers ====
Note: G = Games pitched; IP = Innings pitched; W = Wins; L = Losses; ERA = Earned run average; SO = Strikeouts

Player	G	IP	W	L	ERA	SO
Cal McVey	11	59.1	5	2	1.52	9

==== Relief pitchers ====
Note: G = Games pitched; W = Wins; L = Losses; SV = Saves; ERA = Earned run average; SO = Strikeouts

Player	G	W	L	SV	ERA	SO
Deacon White	1	0	0	1	0.00	3
Ross Barnes	1	0	0	0	20.25	0
John Peters	1	0	0	1	0.00	0
