= George McManus (baseball) =

Irish baseball manager

- Manager
- Born: June 28, 1846; Ireland
- Died: October 2, 1918 (aged 72); New York City
- Batted: Unknown Threw: Unknown

MLB debut
- September 12, 1876, for the St. Louis Brown Stocking

Last MLB appearance
- October 6, 1877, for the St. Louis Brown Stockings

MLB statistics
- Games: 68
- Win–loss record: 34 – 34
- Winning %: .500

Teams
- St. Louis Brown Stockings (1876–1877)

George McManus (June 18, 1846 – October 2, 1918) was a manager in Major League Baseball. He managed the St. Louis Brown Stockings of the National League for part of the 1876 season and all of the 1877 season.

His career managerial record was 34–34 in 68 games. His team finished in second place in 1876 and fourth in 1877. In the former season, he was manager for an unofficial five-game post-season series between his St. Louis team and the first place Chicago White Stockings. In the "Championship of the West", St. Louis won four to one.
