= George Seward (baseball) =

American baseball player and umpire (1851–1904)

- Catcher/Outfielder
- Born: c. 1851; New York City, New York, US
- Died: March 28, 1904 (aged 52–53); St. Louis, Missouri, US

MLB debut
- May 19, 1875, for the St. Louis Brown Stockings

Last MLB appearance
- August 8, 1882, for the St. Louis Brown Stockings

MLB statistics
- Games played: 64
- At bats: 243
- Batting average: .226
- Stats at Baseball Reference

Teams
- St. Louis Brown Stockings (NA) (1875); New York Mutuals (NL) (1876); St. Louis Brown Stockings (AA) (1882)

George Thomas Seward (c. 1851 – March 28, 1904) was an American 19th-century professional baseball player and umpire.

Seward played for the St. Louis Brown Stockings of the National Association in 1875 and the New York Mutuals of the National League in 1876. He also played one season for the St. Louis Brown Stockings of the American Association in 1882.

In 1876 through 1878, Seward umpired a total of 21 games in the National League. In 1884, he umpired 54 games in the American Association, and 33 games in the Union Association.
