= John Carbine =

American baseball player (1855–1915)

- First baseman
- Born: October 12, 1855; Syracuse, New York
- Died: September 11, 1915 (aged 59); Chicago
- Batted: Unknown Threw: Unknown

MLB debut
- May 8, 1875, for the Keokuk Westerns

Last MLB appearance
- June 1, 1876, for the Louisville Grays

MLB statistics
- At bats: 61
- RBI: 3
- Home runs: 0
- Batting average: .115
- Stats at Baseball Reference

Teams
- Keokuk Westerns (1875); Louisville Grays (1876)

John C. Carbine (October 12, 1855 – September 11, 1915) was an American professional baseball player who played first base for the 1875 Keokuk Westerns and 1876 Louisville Grays.
