= Bobby Clack =

English baseball player and umpire (1850–1933)

- Outfielder
- Born: June 13, 1850; England
- Died: October 22, 1933 (aged 83); Danvers, Massachusetts, U.S.
- Batted: Right Threw: Right

MLB debut
- May 13, 1874, for the Brooklyn Atlantics

Last MLB appearance
- 1876, for the Cincinnati Reds

MLB statistics
- Games played: 82
- Runs scored: 33
- Hits: 48
- Batting average: .154
- Stats at Baseball Reference

Teams
- Brooklyn Atlantics (1874–1875); Cincinnati Reds (1876)

Robert Suter Clack (June 13, 1850 – October 22, 1933) was an English born professional baseball player outfielder who played with the Brooklyn Atlantics and the Cincinnati Reds from 1874 to 1876. He also served as an umpire for five games in 1876.
