= Frank Whitney (baseball) =

American baseball player (1856–1943)

- Outfielder
- Born: February 18, 1856; Brockton, Massachusetts, U.S.
- Died: October 30, 1943 (aged 87); Baltimore, Maryland, U.S.
- Batted: Right Threw: Right

MLB debut
- May 17, 1876, for the Boston Red Caps

Last MLB appearance
- 1876, for the Boston Red Caps

MLB statistics
- Games played: 34
- Batting average: .237
- RBIs: 15
- Stats at Baseball Reference

Teams
- Boston Red Caps (1876)

Frank Thomas Whitney (February 18, 1856 – October 30, 1943), nicknamed "Jumbo," was an American Major League Baseball player. He played outfield for the 1876 Boston Red Caps. His younger brother, Art Whitney, was also a professional baseball player. At the time of his death he had been the last living player from the 1876 season.
