= William Hulbert =

Co-founder of the National League (1832–1882)

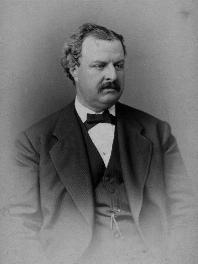
- Born: October 23, 1832; Burlington Flats, New York, U.S.
- Died: April 10, 1882 (aged 49); Chicago, Illinois, U.S.

Member of the National

Baseball Hall of Fame
- Induction: 1995
- Election method: Veterans Committee

William Ambrose Hulbert (October 23, 1832 – April 10, 1882) was an American professional baseball executive who was one of the founders of the National League, considered by many to be baseball's first major league, and was also the president of the Chicago White Stockings franchise.

== Biography ==
Born in Burlington Flats, New York, Hulbert moved with his family to Chicago two years later where he lived the rest of his life save for a stint at Beloit College beginning in 1867. When he returned to Chicago from school, he married into the family of a successful grocer and expanded the business into the coal trade. A backer of the Chicago White Stockings baseball club of the National Association from its inception in 1871, Hulbert became an officer of the club in 1874 when it resumed play after being forced to sit out two seasons due to the Great Chicago Fire. He assumed the club presidency the next year.

In his brief tenure as a club president in the National Association, Hulbert soon became fed up with the circuit's lack of definite structure, organization, and integrity. He was particularly disgusted by the Davy Force case in 1874. Force, the shortstop of the White Stockings that year, was a notorious "contract jumper", a common occurrence in the National Association in which players would move from team to team each year selling themselves to the highest bidder. Determined to keep his shortstop, Hulbert signed him to a contract for the 1875 season in September, before the 1874 season had concluded, a violation of league rules. In December, Force signed a second contract with the Philadelphia Athletics, and Hulbert protested. The Association Judiciary committee originally awarded Force to Chicago, but at a second meeting in early 1875, after a Philadelphia man had been elected president of the association, the decision was reversed.

Hulbert became convinced that the Eastern ballclubs were conspiring to keep the Western clubs second-class citizens and plotted to overthrow the might of the Boston Red Stockings, which won each association pennant between 1872 and 1875. To do so, he convinced Illinois native and star Boston pitcher Al Spalding to sign with Chicago for the 1876 season and also signed Boston stars Cal McVey, Deacon White, and Ross Barnes and Philadelphia stars Cap Anson and Ezra Sutton, though Sutton later backed out of his deal. The signings were made while the 1875 season was in progress, but Hulbert decided to anticipate league disciplinary action by establishing his own league.

After enlisting the support of Western clubs including the Cincinnati Red Stockings, the St. Louis Brown Stockings, and the Louisville Grays, Hulbert held a meeting with the Eastern clubs of the Mutual of New York, the Athletic of Philadelphia, the Boston Red Stockings, and the Hartford Dark Blues on February 2, 1876, at the Grand Central Hotel in New York City and sold them on his vision for a new league founded on the principles of square dealings, recognition of contracts, and business integrity. He also proposed a more orderly game on the field through prohibitions on drinking, gambling, and Sunday baseball, and more definite organization off it through limiting membership to cities of 75,000 inhabitants or more, giving clubs exclusive territorial rights, and mandating teams to complete a predetermined schedule. The result was the founding of the National League of Professional Baseball Clubs. At the founding meeting, straws were drawn to determine the first president of the circuit, and Hartford president Morgan Bulkeley drew the short straw. He only remained president for one year and took little interest in the affairs of the league, not even bothering to attend the 1877 league meeting. When he did not show up, Hulbert was elected the new president, retaining his presidency of the White Stockings as well.

In his tenure as president from 1877 to his death in 1882, Hulbert ruled with an iron fist and took steps to ensure league integrity and compliance with league rules. His first major act was expelling the New York and Philadelphia clubs from the league for failure to complete their 1876 schedules as required. While losing clubs in the two most populous cities in the United States was a serious blow, the expulsion sent a clear message that the lax adherence to league rules that had plagued the National Association would not be tolerated. Also in response to the New York/Philadelphia scheduling problem, Hulbert ended the practice of clubs determining their schedules through the club secretaries by declaring that the league itself would establish the schedule. Hulbert also instituted the practice of the league hiring of umpires to bolster public perceptions of league integrity.

Perhaps his greatest challenge was dealing with four members of the Louisville ball club who conspired to throw the 1877 pennant. In a move that established a precedent for future handling of dishonest ballplayers, Hulbert banned all four players from the league for life. The banning had a ripple effect across the league that led to the Louisville, St. Louis, and Hartford franchises folding, and the league began to face a crisis as Hulbert was forced to replace these and other teams over the years with clubs from smaller cities such as Providence, Indianapolis, Milwaukee, and Syracuse. In 1879, after the Cincinnati franchise nearly collapsed amid controversy created by having three star players making more money than the rest of the team combined, Hulbert oversaw the imposition of the first reserve rule designed to curb player salaries and prevent players jumping from team to team.

Hulbert's final major act as president also involved the Cincinnati franchise. While it was understood from the league's inception that beer and Sunday baseball were inappropriate, they were not actually prohibited by league rules, and the Cincinnati club, playing in a city with a large German population fond of beer and Sunday entertainment, practiced both activities to boost revenue. This led the league to pass new rules banning both for the 1881 season and then expelling the unapologetic Cincinnati club for violating a rule that would not go into effect for two more months. This final league expulsion brought the National League its greatest challenge yet, as Cincinnati spearheaded the creation of the rival American Association in 1882 that moved into populous areas abandoned by the NL over the years such as New York and Philadelphia. Hulbert did not live to see this rival franchise begin play, however, dying of a heart attack in 1882 at the age of 49 two weeks before the AA made its debut.

For decades, Hulbert was kept out of the Baseball Hall of Fame despite his critical role in founding the first professional league. This was because when American League founder and first president Ban Johnson was elected to the Hall in 1937, it was decided that an early National League executive should be enshrined as well, and apparently not looking into history too closely, the electors chose to elect Morgan Bulkeley because he was the first president of the league. The Veterans Committee finally enshrined Hulbert in 1995.

Hulbert is buried in Graceland Cemetery under a grave marker designed to look like a baseball. In addition to his name and his birth and death dates, the marker includes the names of the cities that were in the National League at the time of his death.

Preceded by None	Owner of the Chicago Cubs; 1876 – 1882	Succeeded by Albert Spalding
