= Bryce's Base Ball Guide =

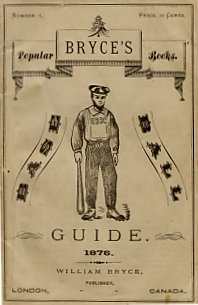
Front cover to Bryce's Base Ball Guide 1876, published in London, Ont.

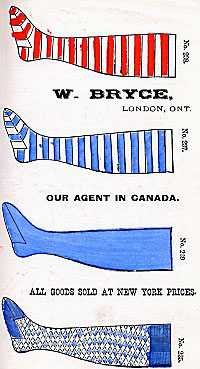
Baseball socks for sale in Bryce's Base Ball Guide 1876

Bryce's Base Ball Guides were two annual Canadian baseball publications, in 1876 and 1877, which provided information to baseball fans and players.

A treasure-trove of information about early Canadian baseball as well as the International Association, they came to light in 2002 when Library and Archives Canada purchased (for $10,000 from an Ottawa bookseller) Bryce's Base Ball Guide of 1876 and Bryce's Base Ball Guide of 1877, two hand-coloured, 75-page booklets published by William Bryce of London, Ontario. They originally sold for a dime. The guides contained playing rules, diagrams of baseball fields, information about the various positions and umpires, the bylaws and constitution of the Canadian Association of Base Ball Players (established on 7 April 1876 in Toronto), a history of baseball in Canada, and records from the 1975 season in southwestern Ontario. The final pages contained advertisements for baseball goods available at this store, Bryce's Ontario Games Emporium. In the book Baseball History from Outside the Lines: A Reader, John E. Dreifort states that Bryce has a limited knowledge of the history of the game, and focuses almost entirely on baseball in Ontario, albeit that he "was entirely conscious of baseball's national character" in Canada.

The two, 2-by-4-inch (5.1 by 10.2 cm) guides are considered to be the first significant publications on Canadian (and American) baseball. Bryce, a Scottish-born bookseller, news agent and sporting goods distributor in London, had a small stake in the London Tecumsehs, considered by many to be the finest ball team in Canada.

During President George W. Bush's visit to the Library and Archives Canada building on November 30, 2004, he showed a special interest in these two early Canadian baseball books which were laid out for his perusal.
