= Dave Murphy (baseball) =

American baseball player (1876-1940)

- Shortstop
- Born: May 4, 1876; Adams, Massachusetts, U.S.
- Died: April 8, 1940 (aged 63); Adams, Massachusetts, U.S.
- Batted: Unknown Threw: Right

MLB debut
- August 28, 1905, for the Boston Beaneaters

Last MLB appearance
- August 30, 1905, for the Boston Beaneaters

MLB statistics
- Games played: 3
- At bats: 11
- Hits: 2
- Stats at Baseball Reference

Teams
- Boston Beaneaters (1905)

David Francis Murphy (May 4, 1876 – April 8, 1940), nicknamed "Dirty Dave", was an American professional baseball player. He played three games for the Boston Beaneaters of the National League in 1905, his only major-league appearances. He also played in Minor League Baseball from 1900 through 1907.
