= Mase Graffen =

American baseball manager

- Manager
- Born: c. 1845; Philadelphia, Pennsylvania
- Died: November 18, 1883; Silver City, New Mexico
- Batted: Unknown Threw: Unknown

MLB debut
- April 25, 1876, for the St. Louis Brown Stockings

Last MLB appearance
- September 9, 1876, for the St. Louis Brown Stockings

MLB statistics
- Games: 56
- Win–loss record: 39 – 17
- Winning %: .696

Teams
- St. Louis Brown Stockings (1876)

Samuel Mason Graffen (c. 1845 - November 18, 1883) was a manager in Major League Baseball. He managed the St. Louis Brown Stockings of the National League for part of the 1876 season.

His career managerial record was 39-17 in 56 games.
