= Dale Williams (baseball) =

American baseball player (1855–1939)

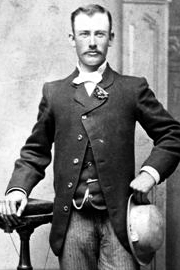
- Pitcher
- Born: October 6, 1855; Ludlow, Kentucky, U.S.
- Died: October 22, 1939 (aged 84); Covington, Kentucky, U.S.
- Batted: Right Threw: Right

MLB debut
- August 12, 1876, for the Cincinnati Reds

Last MLB appearance
- 1876, for the Cincinnati Reds

MLB statistics
- Win–loss record: 1–8
- Earned run average: 4.23
- Strikeouts: 9
- Stats at Baseball Reference

Teams
- Cincinnati Reds (1876)

Elisha Alphonso "Dale" Williams (October 6, 1855 – October 22, 1939) was an American Major League Baseball pitcher. Williams played for the Cincinnati Reds in 1876. In 9 career games, he had a 1–8 record with a 4.23 ERA. He batted and threw right-handed.

Williams was born in Ludlow, Kentucky, and died in Covington, Kentucky.
