= Art Ball =

American baseball player (1876–1915)

- Infielder
- Born: April 1876; Kentucky, U.S.
- Died: December 26, 1915 (aged 39); Chicago, Illinois, U.S.
- Batted: Unknown Threw: Right

MLB debut
- August 1, 1894, for the St. Louis Browns

Last MLB appearance
- October 15, 1898, for the Baltimore Orioles

MLB statistics
- Games played: 33
- Hits: 16
- Batting average: .190
- Stats at Baseball Reference

Teams
- St. Louis Browns (1894); Baltimore Orioles (1898)

Arthur Clark Ball (April 1876 – December 26, 1915) was an American Major League Baseball player from Kentucky. Ball played parts of two seasons in the Majors; one game for the 1894 St. Louis Browns, and 32 games for the 1898 Baltimore Orioles.

After his professional baseball career ended after 1913, he moved to Chicago, where he was a nightwatchman. Ball died at the age of 39 in Chicago of liver cirrhosis and peritonitis with pulmonary tuberculosis, and is interred at Mount Olivet Cemetery.
