= America's National Game =

1911 book by Albert Spalding

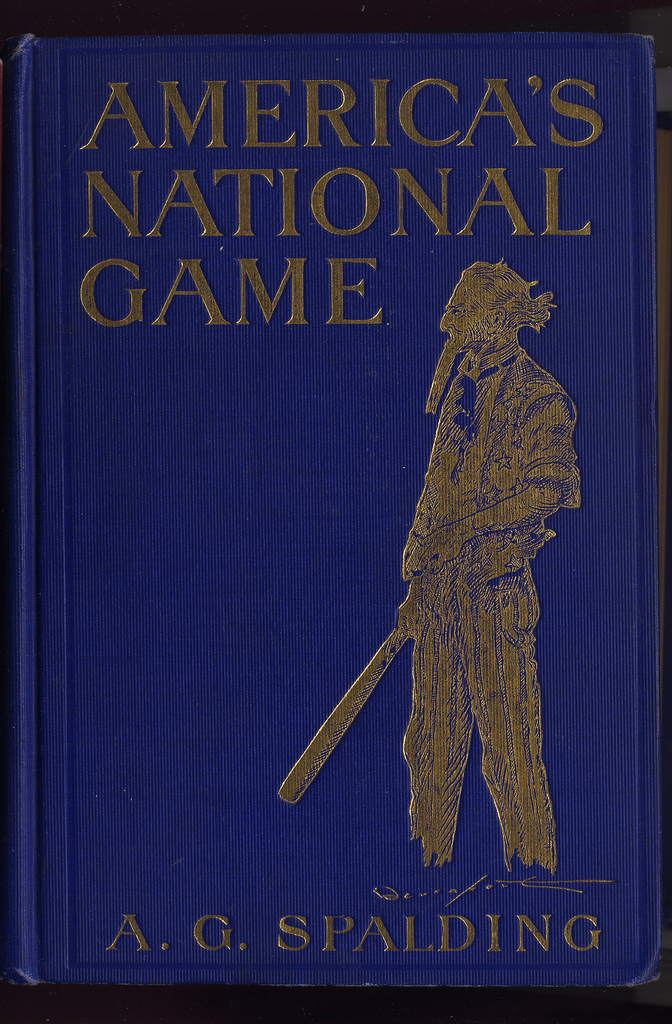
- Author: Albert Spalding
- Language: English
- Subject: History of baseball
- Genre: Non-fiction
- Publication date: 1911
- Publication place: United States

America's National Game is a book by Albert Spalding, published in 1911, that details the early history of the sport of baseball. It is one of the defining books in the early formative years of modern baseball.

Much of the story is told first-hand; since the 1850s, Spalding had been involved in the game, first as a pitcher and later a manager and club owner. Later he branched out to become a leading manufacturer of sporting goods.

In addition to his personal recollections, he had access to the records of Henry Chadwick, the game's first statistician and archivist. Much of his early history of the game is considered to be reliable. Spalding was, however, said to aggrandize his role in the major moments in baseball's history. Early editions of the book include quality full-page photo-plates of important players.

== See also ==
- History of baseball
