= Bob Valentine (baseball) =

American baseball player

- Catcher
- Batted: Unknown Threw: Unknown

MLB debut
- May 20, 1876, for the New York Mutuals

Last MLB appearance
- May 20, 1876, for the New York Mutuals

MLB statistics
- Batting average: .000
- At-bats: 3
- Stats at Baseball Reference

Teams
- New York Mutuals (1876)

Robert Valentine was a Major League Baseball catcher who played for one season. He played for the New York Mutuals for one game on May 20 during the 1876 New York Mutuals season, making him the very first major league player whose career lasted a single game.
