= John Brown (1890s pitcher) =

American baseball player (1876–1908)

- Pitcher
- Born: August 24, 1876; Philadelphia, Pennsylvania, US
- Died: July 18, 1908 (aged 31); Philadelphia, Pennsylvania, US
- Batted: Unknown Threw: Right

MLB debut
- August 11, 1897, for the Brooklyn Bridegrooms

Last MLB appearance
- August 11, 1897, for the Brooklyn Bridegrooms

MLB statistics
- Win–loss record: 0-1
- Earned run average: 7.20
- Strikeouts: 0
- Stats at Baseball Reference

Teams
- Brooklyn Bridegrooms (1897)

John J. Brown (August 24, 1876 – July 18, 1908), nicknamed "Ad", was an American professional baseball player in the late 19th century. In addition to three season in minor league baseball, he appeared in one game for the 1897 Brooklyn Bridegrooms as a starting pitcher.

== Career ==
Brown began his professional baseball career in 1897, when he joined the Derby Angels of the class-F Connecticut State League. Later that season, he was signed by the Brooklyn Bridgegrooms, and appeared in one game. On August 11, he was the Bridegrooms starting pitcher in game two of a doubleheader against the Baltimore Orioles. Brown, described as a "youngster from Trenton, New Jersey", surrendered eight runs in five innings pitched, four coming in the bottom half of the first inning. In total, he issued four bases on balls, and hit three batters, and received the loss as the Orioles defeated the Bridegrooms by a score of 13 to 3. He did not make another appearance in professional baseball during the 1897 season.

In 1898, he returned to the minor leagues. He played for the Columbus Buckeyes of the Western League from July 22 to September 19, appearing 19 games as a pitcher, and had a win–loss record of 9–7 in 140 innings pitched. Brown began the 1899 season in the Eastern League with the Toronto Maple Leafs, playing mostly as an outfielder. He appeared in 36 games for the Maple Leafs, and had a .265 batting average, as well as a 4–4 record in nine games pitched. He was no longer a member of the team by August 8, but returned to the Connecticut League with the New Haven Blues. He pitched in two games for the Blues, winning one game and losing the other, along with a .259 batting average in seven games as an outfielder. His last day with the team was on September 9, and he never appeared in professional baseball again.

== Personal life ==
Brown was born on August 24, 1876, in Philadelphia, Pennsylvania, to James and Margaret Brown. He died there on July 18, 1908, at the age of 31 of extensive burns on his body and limbs due to a work-related accident at UGI Corporation. He is interred at the Old Cathedral Cemetery in Philadelphia. He left a wife, Catherine G.
