= 1876 Hartford Dark Blues season =

1876 Hartford Dark Blues
- League: National League
- Ballpark: Hartford Ball Club Grounds
- City: Hartford, Connecticut
- Record: 47–21 (.691)
- League place: 2nd
- Owner: Morgan Bulkeley
- Manager: Bob Ferguson

The Hartford Dark Blues joined the new National League for its first season in 1876, and team owner Morgan Bulkeley was the first National League president. They finished the season in second place.

== Regular season ==
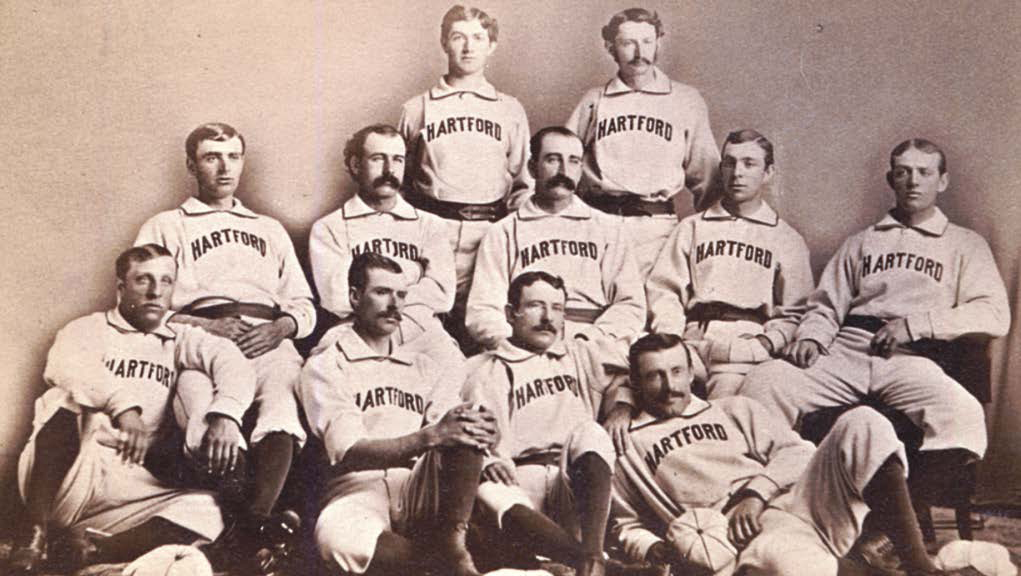
Back row: Tommy Bond, Candy Cummings Middle row: Tom Carey, Everett Mills, Bob Ferguson, Bill Harbridge, Tom York Front row: Dick Higham, Jack Burdock, Jack Remsen, Doug Allison

=== Season standings ===
National League
Team	W	L	Pct.	GB	Home	Road
Chicago White Stockings	52	14	.788	—	25‍–‍6	27‍–‍8
Hartford Dark Blues	47	21	.691	6	23‍–‍9	24‍–‍12
St. Louis Brown Stockings	45	19	.703	6	24‍–‍6	21‍–‍13
Boston Red Caps	39	31	.557	15	19‍–‍17	20‍–‍14
Louisville Grays	30	36	.455	22	15‍–‍16	15‍–‍20
New York Mutuals	21	35	.375	26	13‍–‍20	8‍–‍15
Philadelphia Athletics	14	45	.237	34½	10‍–‍24	4‍–‍21
Cincinnati Reds	9	56	.138	42½	6‍–‍24	3‍–‍32

=== Record vs. opponents ===
1876 National League record Sources:
Team	BSN	CHI	CIN	HAR	LOU	NYM	PHN	STL
Boston	—	1–9	10–0	2–8	5–5	8–2	9–1	4–6
Chicago	9–1	—	10–0	6–4	9–1	7–1	7–1	4–6
Cincinnati	0–10	0–10	—	1–9	2–8	1–7	3–5	2–7
Hartford	8–2	4–6	9–1	—	9–1–1	4–4	9–1	4–6
Louisville	5–5	1–9	8–2	1–9–1	—	5–3–1	6–2–1	4–6
New York	2–8	1–7	7–1	4–4	3–5–1	—	3–4	1–6
Philadelphia	1–9	1–7	5–3	1–9	2–6–1	4–3	—	0–8
St. Louis	6–4	6–4	7–2	6–4	6–4	6–1	8–0	—

=== Roster ===
1876 Hartford Dark Blues
Roster
Pitchers: Tommy Bond; Candy Cummings	Catchers: Doug Allison; Bill Harbridge; Infielders: Jack Burdock; Tom Carey; Bob Ferguson; Everett Mills	Outfielders: John Cassidy; Dick Higham; Jack Remsen; Tom York	Manager: Bob Ferguson

== Player stats ==
=== Batting ===
==== Starters by position ====
Note: Pos = Position; G = Games played; AB = At bats; H = Hits; Avg. = Batting average; HR = Home runs; RBI = Runs batted in

Pos	Player	G	AB	H	Avg.	HR	RBI
C	Doug Allison	44	163	43	.264	0	15
1B	Everett Mills	63	254	66	.260	0	23
2B	Jack Burdock	69	309	80	.259	0	23
3B	Bob Ferguson	69	310	82	.265	0	32
SS	Tom Carey	68	289	78	.270	0	26
OF	Jack Remsen	69	324	89	.275	1	30
OF	Tom York	67	263	68	.259	1	39
OF	Dick Higham	67	312	102	.327	0	35

==== Other batters ====
Note: G = Games played; AB = At Bats; H = Hits; Avg. = Batting average; HR = Home runs; RBI = Runs batted in

Player	G	AB	H	Avg.	HR	RBI
Bill Harbridge	30	106	23	.217	0	6
John Cassidy	12	47	13	.277	0	8

=== Pitching ===
==== Starting pitchers ====
Note: G = Games pitched; IP = Innings pitched; W = Wins; L = Losses; ERA = Earned run average; SO = Strikeouts

Player	G	IP	W	L	ERA	SO
Tommy Bond	45	408.0	31	13	1.68	88
Candy Cummings	24	216.0	16	8	1.67	26
