= Albert Spalding =

American baseball player (1850–1915)

Albert Goodwill Spalding
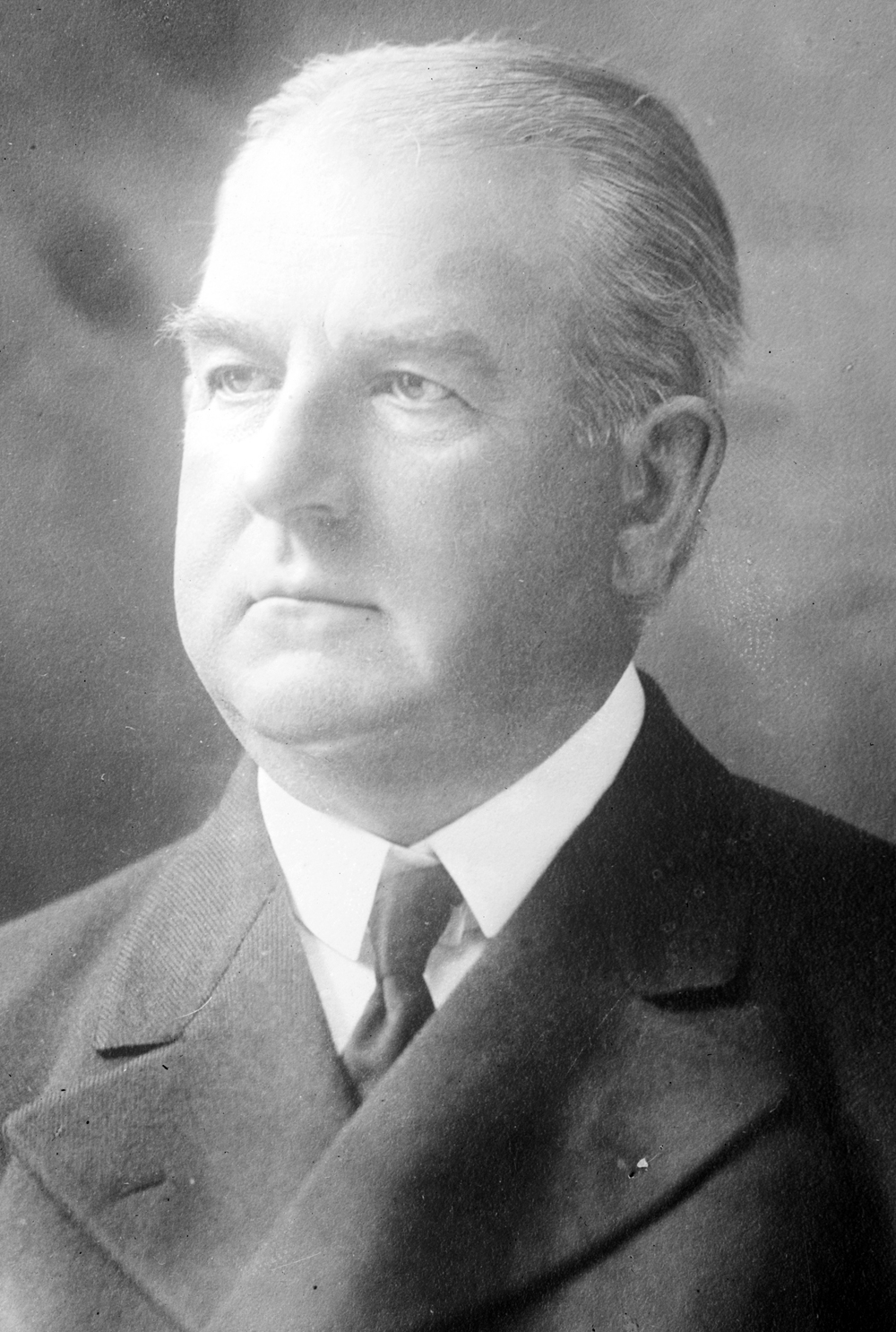
- Spalding in 1910
- Pitcher
- Born: September 2, 1850; Byron, Illinois, U.S.
- Died: September 9, 1915 (aged 65); San Diego, California, U.S.
- Batted: Right Threw: Right

MLB debut
- May 5, 1871, for the Boston Red Stockings

Last MLB appearance
- August 31, 1878, for the Chicago White Stockings

MLB statistics
- Win–loss record: 251–65
- Earned run average: 2.13
- Strikeouts: 248
- Managerial record: 78–47–1
- Managerial winning %: .624
- Stats at Baseball Reference

Teams
- National Association of Base Ball Players Rockford Forest Citys (1866–1870) League Player Boston Red Stockings (1871–1875) Chicago White Stockings (1876–1878) League Manager Chicago White Stockings (1876–1877)

Career highlights and awards
- 4× NA pennant (1872–1875); NL pennant (1876); 6× Wins leader (1871–1876); NA saves leader (1875); Chicago Cubs Hall of Fame

Member of the National

Baseball Hall of Fame
- Induction: 1939
- Election method: Old-Timers Committee

Albert Goodwill Spalding (September 2, 1850 – September 9, 1915) was an American pitcher, manager, and executive in the early years of professional baseball, and the co-founder of the Spalding sporting goods company. He was born and raised in Byron, Illinois, and graduated from Rockford Central High School in Rockford, Illinois. He played major league baseball from 1871 to 1878. Spalding set a trend when he started wearing a baseball glove.

After his retirement as a player, Spalding remained active with the Chicago White Stockings as president and part-owner. In the 1880s, he took players on the first world tour of baseball. With William Hulbert, Spalding organized the National League. He later called for the commission that investigated the origins of baseball and falsely credited Abner Doubleday with creating the game.

As of the 2026 season, Spalding holds the individual records (Note: Minimum 2,000 career innings pitched.) for the fewest career home runs per nine innings (0.0468) and the highest career winning percentage (.794). He was inducted into the Baseball Hall of Fame in 1939.

== Baseball career ==
=== Player ===
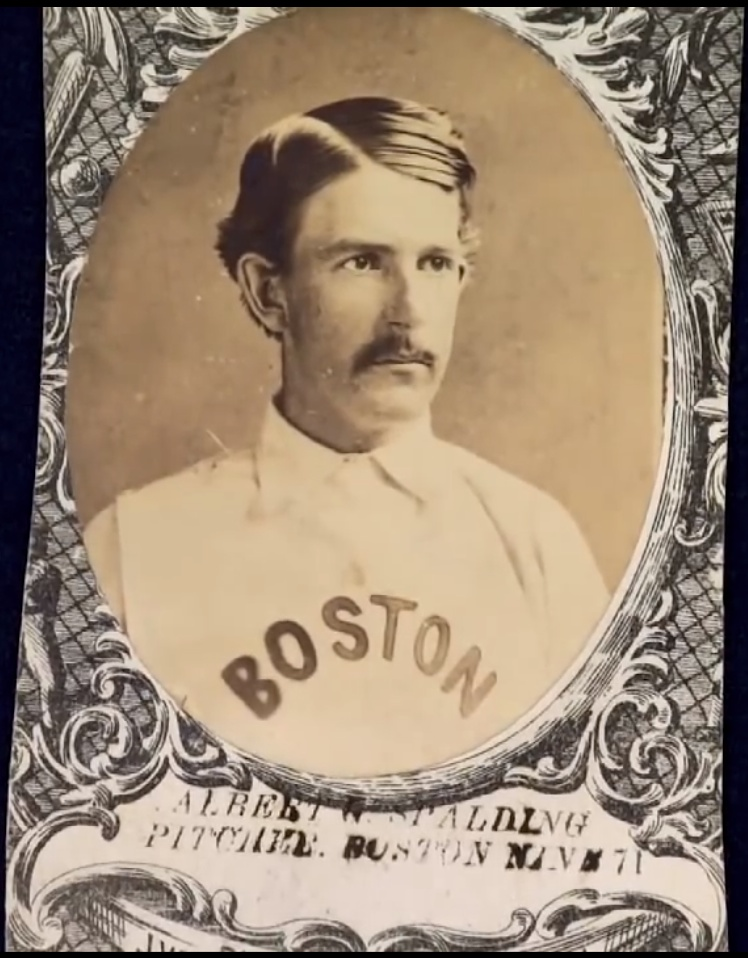
Albert Spalding on a 1871 Boston Red Stockings baseball card.

Having played baseball throughout his youth, Spalding first played competitively with the Rockford Pioneers, a youth team, which he joined in 1865. After pitching his team to a 26–2 victory over a local men's amateur team (the Mercantiles), he was approached at the age of 15 by the Rockford Forest Citys, for whom he played for five years. Following the formation of baseball's first professional organization, the National Association of Professional Base Ball Players (which became known as the National Association, the Association, or NA) in 1871, Spalding joined the Boston Red Stockings (precursor club to the modern Atlanta Braves) and was highly successful; winning 206 games (and losing only 53) as a pitcher and batting .323 as a hitter.

William Hulbert, principal owner of the Chicago White Stockings, did not like the loose organization of the National Association and the gambling element that influenced it, so he decided to create a new organization, which he dubbed the National League of Baseball Clubs. To aid him in this venture, Hulbert enlisted the help of Spalding. Playing to the pitcher's desire to return to his Midwestern roots and challenging Spalding's integrity, Hulbert convinced Spalding to sign a contract to play for the White Stockings (now known as the Chicago Cubs) in 1876. Spalding then coaxed teammates Deacon White, Ross Barnes and Cal McVey, as well as Philadelphia Athletics players Cap Anson and Bob Addy, to sign with Chicago. This was all done under complete secrecy during the playing season because players were all free agents in those days and they did not want their current club and especially the fans to know they were leaving to play elsewhere the next year. News of the signings by the Boston and Philadelphia players leaked to the press before the season ended and all of them faced verbal abuse and physical threats from the fans of those cities.

He was "the premier pitcher of the 1870s", leading the league in victories for each of his six full seasons as a professional. During each of those years he was his team's only pitcher. In 1876, Spalding won 47 games as the prime pitcher for the White Stockings and led them to win the first-ever National League pennant by a wide margin.

In 1877, Spalding began to use a glove to protect his catching hand. People had used gloves previously, but they were not popular, and Spalding himself was skeptical of wearing one at first. However, once he began donning gloves, he influenced other players to do so.

Spalding retired from playing baseball in 1878 at the age of 27, although he continued as president and part owner of the White Stockings and a major influence on the National League. Spalding's .796 career winning percentage (from an era when teams played about once or twice a week) is the highest ever by a baseball pitcher, .058 ahead of Negro league star Dave Brown's .738. Spalding was the first pitcher to reach 200 wins.

=== Organizer and executive ===
In the months after signing for Chicago, Hulbert and Spalding organized the National League by enlisting the two major teams in the East and the four other top teams in what was then considered to be the West, also known as the jungle. Joining Chicago initially were the leading teams from Cincinnati, Louisville, and St. Louis. The owners of these western clubs accompanied Hulbert and Spalding to New York where they secretly met with owners from New York City, Philadelphia, Hartford, and Boston. Each signed the league's constitution, and the National League was officially born. "Spalding was thus involved in the transformation of baseball from a game of gentlemen athletes into a business and a professional sport." Although the National Association held on for a few more seasons, it was no longer recognized as the premier organization for professional baseball. Gradually, it faded out of existence and was replaced by myriad minor leagues and associations around the country.

In 1886, with Spalding as president of the franchise, the Chicago White Stockings (today's Chicago Cubs), began holding spring training in Hot Springs, Arkansas, which subsequently has been called the "birthplace" of spring training baseball. The location and the training concept was the brainchild of Spalding and his player/manager Cap Anson, who saw that the city and the natural springs created positives for their players. They first played in an area called the Hot Springs Baseball Grounds. Many other teams followed the concept and began training in Hot Springs and other locations.

In 1905, after Henry Chadwick wrote an article saying that baseball grew from the British sports of cricket and rounders, Spalding called for a commission to find out the real source of baseball. The commission called for citizens who knew anything about the founding of baseball to send in letters. After three years of searching, on December 30, 1907, Spalding received a letter that (erroneously) declared baseball to be the invention of Abner Doubleday. The commission was biased, as Spalding would not appoint anyone to the commission if they believed the sport was somewhat related to rounders or cricket. Just before the commission issued its findings, in a letter to sportswriter Tim Murnane, Spalding noted, "Our good old American game of baseball must have an American Dad." The project, later called the Mills Commission, concluded that "Base Ball had its origins in the United States" and "the first scheme for playing baseball, according to the best evidence available to date, was devised by Abner Doubleday at Cooperstown, N.Y., in 1839."

Receiving the archives of Henry Chadwick in 1908, Spalding combined these records with his own memories (and biases) to write America's National Game (published 1911) which, despite its flaws, was probably the first scholarly account of the history of baseball.

In 1912, Spalding wrote "Neither our wives, our sisters, our daughters, our sweethearts, may play Base Ball on the field... they may play Basket Ball, and achieve laurels; they may play Golf, and receive trophies, but Base Ball is too strenuous for womankind, except as she may take part in grandstands, with applause for the brilliant play, with waiving kerchief to the hero of the three-bagger."

=== Businessman ===
In 1876 while Spalding was playing and organizing the league, Spalding and his brother Walter began a sporting goods store in Chicago, which grew rapidly (14 stores by 1901) and expanded into a manufacturer and distributor of all kinds of sporting equipment. The company became "synonymous with sporting goods" and is still a going concern.

=== Spalding Athletic Library ===
Spalding, from 1892 to 1941, sold books under the name Spalding Athletic Library on many different sports.

=== World Tour ===
In 1888–1889, Spalding took a group of major league players around the world to promote baseball and Spalding sporting goods. This was the first-ever world baseball tour. Playing across the western U.S., the tour made stops in Hawaii (although no game was played), New Zealand, Australia, Ceylon, Egypt, Italy, France, and England. The tour returned to grand receptions in New York, Philadelphia, and Chicago. The tour included future Hall of Famers Cap Anson and John Montgomery Ward.

The tour was also touted by Spalding as a launching point for baseball to reach the global stage. At a celebratory dinner in Manhattan, he celebrated the tour – perhaps prematurely – for establishing "our national game throughout the world." Following Spalding's statements, Mark Twain proclaimed that the tour "carried the American name to the outermost parts of the earth, and covered it with glory every time."

While Spalding and company gushed about their schlep around the world, waxing lyrical about baseball's future as a global sport, in reality, the tour had very little impact on the sport's hold overseas. Sports like soccer, rugby, and cricket had already been established in many other countries due to the presence of European imperialism so baseball had a difficult time gaining popularity in these regions. While baseball did reach a wider global audience, it was due to a larger scale diffusion of the sport rather than the efforts of one magnate, like Spalding envisioned.

While the players were on the tour, the National League instituted new rules regarding player pay that led to a revolt of players, led by Ward, who started the Players' League the following season (1890). The league lasted one year, partially due to the anti-competitive tactics of Spalding to limit its success. The tour and formation of the Player's League is depicted in the 2015 movie Deadball.

=== 1900 Olympics ===
In 1900 Spalding was appointed by President McKinley as the USA's Commissioner at that year's Summer Olympic Games.

== Other activities ==
Spalding had been a prominent member of the Theosophical Society under William Quan Judge. In 1900, Spalding moved to San Diego having recently married his second wife, Elizabeth and became a prominent member and supporter of the Theosophical community Lomaland, which was being developed on Point Loma by Katherine Tingley. He built an estate in the Sunset Cliffs area of Point Loma where he lived with Elizabeth for the rest of his life. The Spaldings raised race horses and collected Chinese fine furniture and art.

The Spaldings had an extensive library which included many volumes on Theosophy, art, and literature. In 1907–1909 he was the driving force behind the development of a paved road, known as the "Point Loma boulevard," from downtown San Diego to Point Loma and Ocean Beach; the road also provided good access to Lomaland. It later provided the basis for California State Route 209. He proposed the project, supervised it on behalf of the city, and paid a portion of the cost out of his own pocket. He joined with George Marston and other civic-minded businessmen to purchase the site of the original Presidio of San Diego, which they developed as a historic park and eventually donated to the city of San Diego. He ran unsuccessfully for the United States Senate in 1911 as a Republican, but lost to eventual winner John D. Works by a vote of 92–21 in the California legislature. He helped to organize the 1915 Panama–California Exposition, serving as second vice-president.

== Managerial record ==
Team	Year	Regular season					Postseason			
Team	Year	Games	Won	Lost	Win %	Finish	Won	Lost	Win %	Result
CHI	1876	66	52	14	.788	1st in NL				
CHI	1877	59	26	33	.441	5th in NL				
Total		125	76	47	.618					

== Death ==
He died of a stroke on September 9, 1915, in San Diego, one week after his 65th birthday. His ashes were scattered at his request.

== Legacy ==
He was elected to the Baseball Hall of Fame by the Veterans Committee in 1939, as one of the first inductees from the 19th century at that summer's opening ceremonies. His plaque in the Hall of Fame reads "Albert Goodwill Spalding. Organizational genius of baseball's pioneer days. Star pitcher of Forest City Club in late 1860s, 4-year champion Bostons 1871–75 and manager-pitcher of champion Chicagos in National League's first year. Chicago president for 10 years. Organizer of baseball's first round-the-world tour in 1888."

His nephew, also named Albert Spalding, was a renowned violinist.

== See also ==
- List of Major League Baseball career wins leaders
- List of Major League Baseball annual wins leaders
- List of Major League Baseball annual ERA leaders
- List of Major League Baseball player-managers
- Major League Baseball titles leaders

== Notes ==
Preceded by William Hulbert	Owner of the Chicago Cubs; 1882 — 1902	Succeeded by Jim Hart
