= St. Louis Brown Stockings =

Professional baseball club

Information
- Location: Based in St. Louis, Missouri
- Founded: 1875
- Folded: 1877
- Former leagues: National League (1876–1877); National Association of Professional Base Ball Players (1875)
- Former ballparks: Sportsman's Park (1875–1877); Grand Avenue Ball Grounds (1875)
- Colors: Brown, white
- Ownership: C.O. Bishop
- Manager: George McManus (1876–1877); Mase Graffen (1876); Dickey Pearce (1875)

The St. Louis Brown Stockings were a professional baseball club based in St. Louis, Missouri, from 1875 to 1877, which competed on the cusps of the existences of two all-professional leagues—the National Association (NA) and the National League (NL). The team is the forerunner of, but not directly connected with, the current St. Louis Cardinals Major League Baseball team. After the conclusion of the 1877 season, a game-fixing scandal involving two players the Brown Stockings had acquired led the team to resign its membership in the NL. The club then declared bankruptcy and folded.

The Brown Stockings did not meet a complete demise, however. Organized by outfielder Ned Cuthbert, a few members of the former club continued to play the following year, though not now bound to any league. They played whomever they could, wherever they could, and still managed to draw crowds and make a profit, leading to play again the following two years. The Brown Stockings regained some of their former success—enough of it that, despite the recent scandal, fans of the team seemed to exhibit a short memory and began to show interest in recreating another professional St. Louis baseball team. In 1881, when German immigrant Chris von der Ahe—owner of a grocery store and saloon who was initially ignorant about baseball—saw the popularity of the club, he bought them out and soon became interested in having the team compete in a professional league. Together with beer magnates in five other cities, the American Association was formed in late 1881, and professional baseball flourished in St. Louis—this time, with the resurrected Brown Stockings the next year.

== Year in the National Association (1875) ==
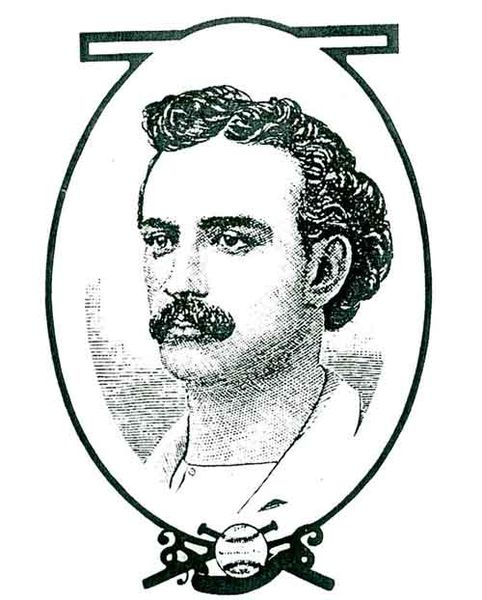
Lip Pike

Joining the National Association of Professional Base Ball Players (NAPBBP), or National Association (NA), in that league's final season, the Brown Stockings were the first of two teams to represent St. Louis in a professional baseball association in 1875 (Spink 1911). Grand Avenue Grounds – the Brown Stockings' home field – was later the site of Sportsman's Park. Outfielder Lip Pike, the previous three-time home run champion in the NA (1871, 1872, 1873), was again a top hitter, leading the league with a league-adjusted OPS of 203. Eighteen-year-old Pud Galvin is credited with leading the league in ERA (1.16) despite pitching just 62 innings, a very small total compared to the league leader in innings pitched (Al Spalding with 570.2). The Brown Stockings finished 39–29 and in fourth place in their only season in the NA.

Like the White Stockings in Chicago (established 1871), the Brown Stockings adopted uniforms and acquired a nickname by descent with variation from the famous Red Stockings of Cincinnati (est. 1869), the self-proclaimed "original" professional baseball team, who garnered much public interest due to an undefeated streak during a barnstorming tour in 1869 and 1870.

== National League entrant (1876–77) ==
=== "Champions of the West" ===
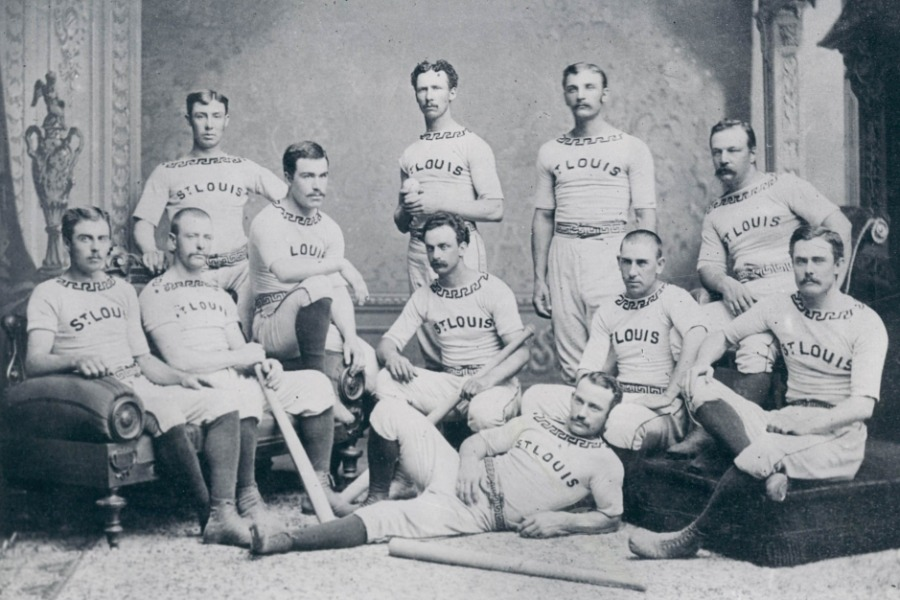
1876 St. Louis Brown Stockings

The St. Louis Brown Stockings entered the National League (NL) as a founding team the following season along with five other former NA teams and two new professional league entrants. George Bradley pitched the first no-hitter in Major League history on July 15, 1876, when the Brown Stockings defeated the Hartford Dark Blues, 2–0. It was one of Bradley's 16 league-leading and record-setting shutouts that season and his 1.23 ERA also led the league. Bradley and Pike (.323 batting average) led the Brown Stockings to a 45–19 record and a third-place finish.

Although the Chicago White Stockings finished with the best regular-season record – making them the default NL champions as no playoff existed – due in part to their already feverish rivalry, the White Stockings and Brown Stockings faced off in an unofficial five-game playoff for the title "Champions of the West." The Brown Stockings won the series.

=== Expulsion ===
With Bradley losing his effectiveness due to an arm injury in 1877 (his ERA increased to 3.31), the Brown Stockings slipped to 28–32 in 1877. The team signed stars Jim Devlin and George Hall from the Louisville Grays, only to become embroiled in a game-fixing scandal that resulted in the permanent expulsion of Devlin and Hall (and two other Grays players) from the league. The Grays and Brown Stockings both filed for bankruptcy in the aftermath of the scandal. However, the Brown Stockings continued to play as an independent barnstorming team on a semi-professional basis from 1878 to 1881.

== Aftermath of the scandal and the resurrection of the Brown Stockings (1878–1881) ==
Despite the team disbanding after the 1877 season, five members of that team – second baseman/manager Mike McGeary, outfielder Ned Cuthbert, shortstop Dickey Pearce, third baseman Joe Battin and pitcher Joe Blong stayed together and informally played under the Brown Stockings name in 1879. However, at this time, popularity for baseball was low, and St. Louis Republican sportswriter Al Spink sought ways to bring back popularity for baseball in St. Louis.

The 1879 team started off by winning 24 of their first 25 games. However, the team encountered a different kind of problem. The Brown Stockings could not match their 1875 attendance average of around 2,300 per game due to their complete domination of the local amateur clubs; they averaged well under one thousand in that year after attendance fall offs between those two years. To avert the issue, they played more competitive teams from out of town. In spite of narrowing the competitive gap, St. Louis kept winning, and, as a result, more and more fans started showing up later in the year.

The 1880 season was another polar season mixed with antipathy and surging fever. August Solari, who leased Grand Avenue Park, was on the last year of the lease and the gate receipts did little to dissuade him from forgoing resigning the lease. In fact, he threatened to dismantle the ballpark. Cuthbert, who also worked for Von der Ahe at his Golden Lion Saloon, urged him to promote the team more. At this time, Von der Ahe still had not made the full realization of baseball's popularity. For months, it was Cuthbert talking about baseball with Von der Ahe, who understood very little about the actual game, that he began to realize its significance because of its profitability.

=== The formation of the Sportsman's Park and Club Association ===
Von der Ahe purchased the remainder of the lease on Grand Avenue Park, sold minority stock and raised enough money to renovate the dilapidated park. John W. Peckington, another local saloon owner, became a minority owner, creating The Sportsman's Park and Club Association. Spink, who himself had not stopped lobbying for more interest in baseball during the sport's relative dormancy in St. Louis, became the secretary and business manager. More fans began attend games and Spink arranged for out-of-town teams to play there, the first being a makeshift team from Cincinnati playing under the traditional name "Redlegs." Profitability increased, and thus, more extensive renovations were completed, further increasing attendance, and again, profitability.

=== The formation of a new all-professional league ===
Again led by Cuthbert, the Brown Stockings continued to win in convincing fashion in 1881, finishing with a 35–15 record. Notable opponents included the Brooklyn Atlantics, the Philadelphia Athletics, the Akrons, and the Louisville Eclipse. The club also continued to prosper at the gate. An evolving baseball renaissance that flourished in St. Louis coincided (and possibly spilled over into) the rising enthusiasm of beer magnates over baseball in five other major cities—Philadelphia, Baltimore, Cincinnati, Louisville, and Pittsburgh. Proprietors who saw the Brown Stockings' unprecedented success and profitability after disenfranchisement began spirited dialogue with Von der Ahe about constructing a new league that could rival, and compete, with the National League. Further, the parties involved chiefly represented cities the NL had excluded. NL-imposed restrictions upon Sunday play and alcohol consumption at their parks was prohibitive to the very means these owners made their fortune. Ultimately, owners of the expansion teams announced the establishment of a new all-professional league called the American Association from the Hotel Gibson in Cincinnati on November 2, 1881. With that act, the St. Louis newspapers lauded Von der Ahe for resurrecting a "corpse" and transforming it "into the liveliest being imaginable."

== Notable alumni ==
- George Bradley, pitched a no-hitter in 1876.
- Lip Pike, Major League Baseball four-time home run champion

== Baseball Hall of Famers ==
St. Louis Brown Stockings Hall of Famers
| Inductee | Position | Tenure | Inducted |
|---|---|---|---|
| Pud Galvin | P | 1875 | 1965 |

== Season-by-season results ==
- 1875 St. Louis Brown Stockings season
- 1876 St. Louis Brown Stockings season
- 1877 St. Louis Brown Stockings season

| Season | Team | League | Division | Regular season | | | | | Postseason | Awards |
| Season | Team | League | Division | Finish^{[a]} | Wins^{[a]} | Losses^{[a]} | Ties^{[a]} | Win% | Postseason | Awards |
|---|---|---|---|---|---|---|---|---|---|---|
| 1875 | 1875 | NA | | 4th | 39 | 29 | 2 | .571 | - | |
| 1876 | 1876 | NL | | 3rd | 45 | 19 | - | .703 | 4–1 | Won "Champions of the West" (exhibition) against Chicago White Stockings ^{[c]} |
| 1877 | 1877 | NL | | 4th | 28 | 32 | - | .467 | - | |
| 1878 | 1878^{[d]} | Unaffiliated | | | 3 | 1 | - | .750 | - | |
| 1879 | 1879^{[d]} | Unaffiliated | | | 26 | 1 | - | .962 | - | |
| 1880 | 1880^{[d]} | Unaffiliated | | | 24 | 1 | - | .960 | - | |
| 1881 | 1881^{[d]} | Unaffiliated | | | 35 | 15 | 1 | .696 | - | |
| Totals | | | | | Wins | Losses | Ties | Win % | | |
| Totals | | | | | 39 | 29 | 2 | .571 | National Association regular season record (1875) | |
| Totals | | | | | 73 | 51 | - | .589 | National League regular season record (1876–1877)^{[e]} | |
| Totals | | | | | 4 | 1 | - | .800 | National League post-season record (1876) | |
| Totals | | | | | 88 | 18 | 1 | .827 | Semi-professional record (1878–81)^{[d]} | |
| Totals | | | | | 112 | 80 | 2 | .582 | Combined NA and NL regular season records (1875–77) | |
| Totals | | | | | 116 | 81 | 2 | .587 | Combined NA and NL regular and post-season record (1875–77) | |

== See also ==
- History of the St. Louis Cardinals (1875–1919)

== Footnotes ==
- ^{a} The Finish, Wins, and Losses columns list regular season results and exclude any postseason play. Regular and postseason records are combined only at the bottom of the list.
- ^{b} The GB column lists "Games Back" from the team that finished in first place that season. It is determined by finding the difference in wins plus the difference in losses divided by two.
- ^{c} The Brown Stockings participated in a best-of-five post-season exhibition with the Chicago White Stockings for the unofficial title of "Champions of the West." Despite the White Stockings winning the NL pennant by finishing with the best regular-season record, they challenged the Brown Stockings to this series because St. Louis won the regular-season series and St. Louis finished second in the NL in terms of winning percentage (45–19, .703 winning percentage) although they were virtually tied for third place with the Hartford Dark Blues (47–21, .691). All five games were played because the Series proved highly profitable.
- ^{d} Because the Brown Stockings had resigned from the National League after the 1877 season and did not enter another professional league or play as an all-professional team again until the 1882 season in the American Association, games played between 1878 and 1881 were exhibition games only and therefore do not count as official games.
- ^{e} Major League Baseball considers this to be the Brown Stockings' official all-time Major League record. MLB does not count the years played in the National Association, post-season games, exhibition or semi-professional (amateur) games towards the official record.
