= Louisville Baseball Park =

Former baseball park in Louisville, Kentucky, US

Coordinates: 38°13′40″N 85°45′48″W

Louisville Baseball Park Louisville Baseball Grounds
- Interactive map of Louisville Baseball Park; Louisville Baseball Grounds
- Location: Louisville, Kentucky
- Surface: Grass

Tenant
- Louisville Grays (NL) (1876–1877)

Louisville Baseball Park (or Grounds) was a baseball park located in Louisville, Kentucky. The park was home to the Louisville Grays of the National League from 1876 to 1877.

The field was located within a large block bounded by 4th Street (east); Hill Street (south); 6th Street (west); and Magnolia Avenue (north). The block was across the street to the south of Central Park, which still exists, and was also adjacent to a field used by the amateur Louisville Eagles.

A few years after the breakup of the club following the 1877 Louisville Grays scandal, the large block was redeveloped for other purposes. It was the home of the Southern Exposition from 1883 through 1887. By the 1890s, the large block had been cut into lots and developed into an upper-class neighborhood known as St. James Court.
