= 1876 in baseball =

The following are the baseball events of the year 1876 throughout the world.

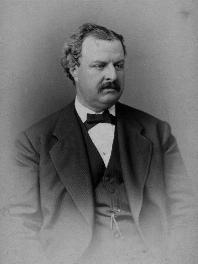
William Hulbert, founder of the National League, the first "major" league.

After a tumultuous five-year existence, the National Association of Professional Base Ball Players (NA) folded following the 1875 season. The National League of Professional Base Ball Clubs (NL) was formed in Chicago, Illinois, by businessman and owner of the Chicago Base Ball Club (now known as the Chicago Cubs), William Hulbert, for the purpose of replacing the NA, which he believed to have been corrupt, mismanaged, full of rowdy, drunken ballplayers, and under the influence of the gambling community. One of the new rules put into place by the new league was that all teams had to be located in cities that had a population of 75,000 or more. The initial NL season began with eight teams, and they were asked to play seventy games between April 22 and October 21. The NL is often considered to be the first "major league", although it has been argued that the NA can make that claim.

== Champions ==
- National League: Chicago Base Ball Club
- Champions of the West: St. Louis Base Ball Association (Unofficial postseason)

== Statistical leaders ==
National League
Stat	Player	Total
AVG	Ross Barnes (CHI)	.429
HR	George Hall (PHI)	5
RBI	Deacon White (CHI)	60
W	Albert Spalding (CHI)	47
ERA	George Bradley (STL)	1.23
K	Jim Devlin (LOU)	122

== National League final standings ==
National League
Team	W	L	Pct.	GB	Home	Road
Chicago White Stockings	52	14	.788	—	25‍–‍6	27‍–‍8
Hartford Dark Blues	47	21	.691	6	23‍–‍9	24‍–‍12
St. Louis Brown Stockings	45	19	.703	6	24‍–‍6	21‍–‍13
Boston Red Caps	39	31	.557	15	19‍–‍17	20‍–‍14
Louisville Grays	30	36	.455	22	15‍–‍16	15‍–‍20
New York Mutuals	21	35	.375	26	13‍–‍20	8‍–‍15
Philadelphia Athletics	14	45	.237	34½	10‍–‍24	4‍–‍21
Cincinnati Reds	9	56	.138	42½	6‍–‍24	3‍–‍32

Locations of teams for the 1876 National League season
National League

== Events ==
Date	Place	Ballpark	Event	Ref
February 2	Chicago		William Hulbert organized the National League of Professional Base Ball Clubs, replacing the National Association of Professional Base Ball Players, which had folded at the conclusion of the 1875 season. Morgan Bulkeley, the owner of the Hartford franchise, is selected as the league's first President.	
February 12	Chicago		After he joined the Chicago Club as a player, Albert Spalding announced his plan to open a sporting goods retail store in Chicago; known today as Spalding.	
April 22	Philadelphia	Athletic Park	The Bostons defeat the Athletics by the score of 6–5, in the first NL game. Joe Borden, pitching under the pseudonym Joe Josephs, is the winning pitcher, and Jim O'Rourke collected the league's first base hit.	
April 25	Louisville	Louisville Baseball Park	In Chicago's first National League game, Albert Spalding threw the NL's first shutout as Chicago defeated Louisville by the score of 4–0. Spalding threw another shutout in the Chicagos' second game, on April 25, also against Louisville.	
May 2	Cincinnati	Avenue Grounds	Ross Barnes of the Chicagos hit the first NL home run, an inside-the-park home run off pitcher Cherokee Fisher of Cincinnati.	
May 13	Hartford	Hartford Ball Club Grounds	The New York Mutuals achieved a triple play in a loss to Hartford.	
May 25	Philadelphia	Jefferson Street Grounds	The game between Athletic and Louisville ended in a 2–2 tie, the first game to end in a tie in the NL and in major league history.	
May 30	New York	Union Grounds	In a game between Louisville and Mutual, Louisville right fielder George Bechtel committed three of the nine errors that led to his team's defeat. Louisville's ownership suspected that he intentionally "fixed" the game by intentionally committing errors to ensure a winning bet for himself and other gamblers. Management intercepted a wire dated June 10, in which Bechtel conspired to lose the game that day. Bechtel refused to resign when confronted with the evidence, so Louisville banished him from the team.	
June 14	Philadelphia	Jefferson Street Grounds	George Hall and Ezra Sutton of Athletic each hit three triples in a 20–5 victory against Cincinnati, the only time teammates have accomplished this feat.	
June 17	Philadelphia	Jefferson Street Grounds	In a 23–15 victory over Cincinnati, George Hall of Athletic becomes the first major league player to hit two home runs in a single game.	
June 27	Chicago	23rd Street Grounds	Davy Force of Athletic collects six hits in six at bats in a 14–13 victory against Chicago and Albert Spalding. He is the first major leaguer to collect six hits in a nine-inning game.	
July 15	St. Louis	Grand Avenue Park	George Bradley of St. Louis pitches the first no-hitter in MLB history, a 2–0 victory against Hartford. It is the second no-hitter recorded in professional play, after Joe Borden's on July 28, 1875.	
July 25	Chicago	23rd Street Grounds	Cal McVey of the Chicagos collects six hits for the second consecutive nine-inning game. He has totaled 15 hits in the last three games, and 18 hits in the last four, both records. After collecting two more hits on July 27, and four more on July 29, McVey will have tied his own record with 18 hits in a four-game stretch.	
August 4	Louisville	Louisville Baseball Park	Trailing Chicago with rain looming, the Louisvilles stall the game by committing error after error until the umpire rules the game a forfeit. The game result would later be removed from the official league standings.	
August 21	St. Louis	Grand Avenue Park	In the ninth inning, and the score tied 6–6, of a game between Chicago and St. Louis, a St. Louis batter hit the base-runner coming from third base with batted ball. The umpire ruled that the runner was allowed to score, so Chicago left the field in protest. The umpire then awarded the game to St. Louis.	
September 5	New York	Union Grounds	George Bradley of St. Louis records his 16th shutout of the season in a 9–0 win over Mutual. This season total of 16 shutouts has since been tied, by Grover Cleveland Alexander, of the Philadelphia Phillies in 1916.	
September 11	Philadelphia		The Philadelphia Athletic Club informs the league office that it will be unable to make its last western road trip due to financial trouble. The owner of the Athletics suggested that the Chicago and St. Louis Clubs play additional games in Philadelphia, take a larger than normal portion of the gate receipts, so they raise enough money to finish their schedule, which was denied.	
September 16	New York		The Mutual Club of New York announces to the league office that it will not make its final western road trip of the season due to lack of funds.	
September 26	Chicago	23rd Street Grounds	The Chicago Club clinches the first National League pennant with a 7–6 win over Hartford.	
October 23	Chicago		The Chicago Tribune published the year-end player statistics, one of which would be the newly created, batting average; the first known instance of this statistic being published.	
December 10	Cleveland		During the NL's Winter Meetings, it was announced that William Hulbert was elected President of the league, and that the Philadelphia Athletics and the New York Mutuals were expelled for failure to complete their required schedule in the 1876 season.	

== Transactions ==
=== Free agents ===
- Chicago White Stockings signed Cap Anson as a free agent.
- Hartford Dark Blues signed Candy Cummings as a free agent.
- Boston Red Caps signed George Wright as a free agent.

=== Loans ===
- August 10, 1876 – The New York Mutuals loaned Nealy Phelps to the Philadelphia Athletics. Phelps returned to the Mutuals on the same day.

== Births ==
Abbreviations
Date	Individual's birth date
Name	Individual's name
†	Elected to the Baseball Hall of Fame

Date	Name	Ref
January 1	Joe Kostal	
January 1	Joe Martin	
January 11	Elmer Flick^{†}	
January 12	George Browne	
January 14	Bill Wolff	
January 22	Warren McLaughlin	
January 25	Fred Glade	
January 27	Otis Clymer	
February	Ike Van Zandt	
February 4	Germany Schaefer	
February 6	Andy Sommerville	
February 7	Pat Moran	
February 10	Doc Sechrist	
February 13	Fred Buckingham	
February 13	Fritz Buelow	
February 15	Carlton Molesworth	
February 19	Joe Marshall	
February 21	John Titus	
February 27	Art Goodwin	
March 15	Bill Hallman	
March 17	J. A. Gammons	
March 29	Harry Lochhead	
March 29	Frank Oberlin	
April	Art Ball	
April 1	Bill Friel	
April 5	Bill Dinneen	
April 6	Charlie Luskey	
April 6	Frank Murphy	

Date	Name	Ref
April 11	Win Kellum	
April 12	Vic Willis^{†}	
April 20	Charlie Hemphill	
April 29	Pat Deisel	
May 1	Larry Battam	
May 2	Jack Morrissey	
May 4	Charlie Hickman	
May 4	Dave Murphy	
May 5	Frank Morrissey	
May 7	Casey Patten	
May 16	George Barclay	
May 24	Fred Jacklitsch	
June 2	Charlie Jones	
June 5	Offa Neal	
June 7	Barney Wolfe	
June 10	George Prentiss	
June 13	Gene McCann	
June 15	Charlie Dexter	
June 19	John Hinton	
June 21	Billy Gilbert	
June 24	Bill Hanlon	
June 29	Patsy Flaherty	
July 1	Jim Buchanan	
July 3	Ralph Frary	
July 7	Happy Iott	
July 10	John Puhl	
July 23	Ginger Beaumont	
July 23	Harry Mathews	

Date	Name	Ref
July 26	Sam Breadon	
July 27	Moose Baxter	
July 29	Emmet Heidrick	
August 2	Kid Nance	
August 7	Pat Carney	
August 7	Lou Nordyke	
August 11	Danny Murphy	
August 18	Gus Dorner	
August 24	John Brown	
August 24	Frank Quinn	
August 28	Doc Hazleton	
August 29	Elmer Stricklett	
September 1	Jimmy Wiggs	
September 3	Jerry Donovan	
September 3	Dusty Miller	
September 3	George Stone	
September 5	Pete LePine	
September 9	Frank Chance^{†}	
September 15	Nick Altrock	
September 17	Otto Krueger	
September 27	Steve Cusack	
September 28	Frank Bates	
September 28	Red Long	
October 13	Wild Bill Donovan	
October 13	Rube Waddell^{†}	
October 15	Percy Coleman	
October 19	Mordecai Brown^{†}	
October 27	Patsy Dougherty	

Date	Name	Ref
October 31	Ed Fisher	
November 3	Phil Geier	
November 3	Ike Rockenfield	
November 6	Dave Altizer	
November 6	Danny Green	
November 8	Danny Shay	
November 9	Walter McCredie	
November 12	Ed Killian	
November 12	Solly Salisbury	
November 14	Harry Howell	
November 17	Claude Elliott	
November 24	Harvey Bailey	
November 25	Lou Castro	
November 28	Lee Fohl	
December 2	Roscoe Miller	
December 4	John Farrell	
December 4	Henry Krug	
December 12	Joe Rickert	
December 13	Rube Kisinger	
December 16	Fred Crolius	
December 16	Sammy Strang	
December 17	Roy Patterson	
December 20	Jimmy Williams	
December 25	Jim Jones	
December 27	Charlie Carr	
December 27	Sam Woodruff	

== Deaths ==
Abbreviations
Date	Individual's death date
Name	Individual's name
Age	Age at death
Cause	Cause of death
Cemetery	Place individual is interred
City/State	City and state of burial
Seasons	Seasons in which individual appeared
Teams	Teams the individual played for or managed

Date	Name	Age	Cause	Cemetery	City/State	Seasons	Teams	Ref
May 29	Tom Miller	26?	Malaria	Evergreen Memorial Park	Bensalem, Pennsylvania	1874–1875	Philadelphia Athletics, St. Louis Brown Stockings	
October 18	Bub McAtee	31	Consumption	St. John Cemetery	Troy, New York	1871–1872	Chicago White Stockings, Troy Haymakers	

== See also ==
- Bryce's Base Ball Guide
