= List of Major League Baseball players from Europe =

The following is a list of Major League Baseball players born in European nations.

== Active players ==
Player	Position	Debut	Team(s)	Country	Notes
Max Kepler	OF	September 27, 2015	Minnesota Twins (2015–2024); Philadelphia Phillies (2025); Arizona Diamondbacks (2026)	Germany	
Isaiah Campbell	RHP	July 7, 2023	Seattle Mariners (2023); Boston Red Sox (2024–2025)	Portugal	
Michael Petersen	RHP	June 18, 2024	Los Angeles Dodgers (2024); Miami Marlins (2024); Atlanta Braves (2025); Miami Marlins (2025–present)	United Kingdom	Played for Great Britain in the 2023 World Baseball Classic
Sam Aldegheri	LHP	August 30, 2024	Los Angeles Angels (2024–present)	Italy	Played for Italy in the 2026 World Baseball Classic
Adam Macko	LHP	May 18, 2026	Toronto Blue Jays (2026–present)	Slovakia	Played for Canada in the 2026 World Baseball Classic

== Austria ==
Austria, officially the Republic of Austria, is a landlocked country in Central Europe.

=== Austrian Empire ===
The Austrian Empire was a modern era successor empire centered on what is today's Austria and which officially lasted from 1804 to 1867.

Name	Debut	Final game	Position	Teams	Ref
John Stedronsky	September 26, 1879	September 30, 1879	third baseman	Chicago Cubs (1879)	

=== Austria-Hungary ===
Austria-Hungary was a monarchic union between the crowns of the Austrian Empire and the Kingdom of Hungary in Central Europe. The union was a result of the Ausgleich or Compromise of 1867, under which the Austrian House of Habsburg agreed to share power with the separate Hungarian government, dividing the territory of the former Austrian Empire between them. The Dual Monarchy had existed for 51 years when it dissolved on October 31, 1918 following military defeat in the First World War.

Name	Debut	Final game	Position	Teams	Ref
Joe Hovlik	July 10, 1909	September 25, 1911	pitcher	Washington Senators (1909–1910); Chicago White Sox (1911)	
Joe Koukalik	September 1, 1904	September 1, 1904	pitcher	Brooklyn Superbas (1904)	
Jack Quinn	April 15, 1909	July 7, 1933	pitcher	New York Highlanders (1909–1912); Boston Braves (1913); Baltimore Terrapins (1914–1915); Chicago White Sox (1918); New York Yankees (1919–1921); Boston Red Sox (1922–1925); Philadelphia Athletics (1925–1930); Brooklyn Robins/Dodgers (1931–1932); Cincinnati Reds (1933)	
Frank Rooney	April 18, 1914	June 6, 1914	first baseman	Indianapolis Hoosiers (1914)	

=== Republic of Austria ===
The First Austrian Republic was established in 1919. In the 1938 Anschluss, Austria was occupied and annexed by Nazi Germany. This lasted until the end of World War II in 1945, after which Austria was occupied by the Allies and its former democratic constitution was restored. In 1955, the Austrian State Treaty re-established Austria as a sovereign state, ending the occupation.

Name	Debut	Final game	Position	Teams	Ref
Kurt Krieger	April 21, 1949	September 11, 1951	pitcher	St. Louis Cardinals (1949–1951)	

== Belgium ==
Belgium, officially the Kingdom of Belgium, is a state in Western Europe. The 1830 Belgian Revolution led to the establishment of an independent, Belgium under a provisional government and a national congress. Since the installation of Leopold I as king in 1831, Belgium has been a constitutional monarchy and parliamentary democracy.

Name	Debut	Final game	Position	Teams	Ref
Brian Lesher	August 25, 1996	September 28, 2002	left fielder, first baseman	Oakland Athletics (1996–1998); Seattle Mariners (2000); Toronto Blue Jays (2002)	

== Denmark ==
Denmark, officially the Kingdom of Denmark together with Greenland and the Faroe Islands, is a Scandinavian country in Northern Europe.

Name	Debut	Final game	Position	Teams	Ref
Olaf Henriksen	August 11, 1911	June 27, 1917	outfielder	Boston Red Sox (1911–1917)	

== Finland ==
=== Grand Duchy of Finland ===
The Grand Duchy of Finland was the predecessor state of modern Finland. It existed between 1809 and 1917 as an autonomous part of the Russian Empire and was ruled by the Russian Emperor as Grand Duke.

Name	Debut	Final game	Position	Teams	Ref
John Michaelson	August 28, 1921	August 30, 1921	pitcher	Chicago White Sox (1921)	

== France ==
France, officially the French Republic, is a sovereign country in Western Europe that extends from the Mediterranean to the English Channel and the North Sea, and from the Rhine to the Atlantic Ocean.

=== French Second Republic ===
The French Second Republic was the republican government of France between the 1848 Revolution and the 1851 coup by Louis-Napoléon Bonaparte which initiated the Second Empire.

Name	Debut	Final game	Position	Teams	Ref
Larry Ressler	April 26, 1875	July 4, 1875	outfielder	Washington Nationals (1875)	

=== French Third Republic ===
The French Third Republic was France from 1870, when the Second French Empire collapsed, to 1940, when France's defeat by Nazi Germany led to the Vichy France government. Vichy was replaced by the French Fourth Republic.

Name	Debut	Final game	Position	Teams	Ref
Claude Gouzzie	July 22, 1903	July 22, 1903	second baseman	St. Louis Browns (1903)	
Duke Markell	September 6, 1951	September 29, 1951	pitcher	St. Louis Browns (1951)	

=== French Fourth Republic ===
The French Fourth Republic was the republican government of France between 1946 and 1958, governed by the fourth republican constitution. France adopted the constitution of the Fourth Republic on 13 October 1946.

Name	Debut	Final game	Position	Teams	Ref
Bruce Bochy	July 19, 1978	October 4, 1987	catcher	Houston Astros (1978–1980); New York Mets (1982); San Diego Padres (1983–1987)	
Charlie Lea	June 12, 1980	October 1, 1988	pitcher	Montreal Expos (1980–1984, 1987); Minnesota Twins (1988)	

=== French Fifth Republic ===
The Fifth Republic is the fifth and current republican constitution of France, introduced on 4 October 1958. The Fifth Republic emerged from the collapse of the French Fourth Republic, replacing the prior parliamentary government with a semi-presidential system.

Name	Debut	Final game	Position	Teams	Ref
Steve Jeltz	July 17, 1983	October 3, 1990	shortstop	Philadelphia Phillies (1983–1989); Kansas City Royals (1990)	

== Germany ==
=== German Confederation ===
The German Confederation was the association of Central European states created by the Congress of Vienna in 1815 to serve as the successor to the Holy Roman Empire of the German Nation, which had been abolished in 1806. The dispute between the two dominant member states of the confederation, Austria and Prussia, over which of the two had the inherent right to rule German lands ended in favor of Prussia after the Austro-Prussian War in 1866, and the collapse of the confederation. This resulted in the creation of the North German Confederation, with a number of south German states remaining independent, although allied first with Austria (until 1867) and subsequently with Prussia (until 1871), after which they became a part of the new nation of Germany.

Name	Debut	Final game	Position	Teams	Ref
Charlie Getzien	August 13, 1884	July 19, 1892	pitcher	Detroit Wolverines (1884–1888); Indianapolis Hoosiers (1889); Boston Beaneaters (1890–1891); Cleveland Spiders (1891); St. Louis Browns (1892)	
George Heubel	May 20, 1871	August 17, 1876	outfielder	Quaker City of Philadelphia (1867); Geary of Philadelphia (1868); Philadelphia Athletics (1869); Cleveland Forest Citys (1870); Philadelphia Athletics (1871); Washington Olympics (1872); New York Mutuals (1876)	
Bill Kuehne	May 1, 1883	September 29, 1892	third baseman	Columbus Buckeyes (1883–1884); Pittsburgh Alleghenys (1885–1889); Pittsburgh Burghers (1890); Columbus Solons (1891); Louisville Colonels (1891–1892); St. Louis Browns (1892); Cincinnati Reds (1892); St. Louis Browns (1892)	
David Lenz	May 7, 1872	May 21, 1872	catcher	Brooklyn Eckfords (1872)	
Joe Miller	June 26, 1872	July 28, 1875	second baseman	Washington Nationals (1872); Keokuk Westerns (1875); Chicago White Stockings (1875)	
Gus Shallix	June 22, 1884	June 2, 1885	pitcher	Cincinnati Red Stockings (1884–1885)	
Frank Siffell	June 14, 1884	September 16, 1885	catcher	Philadelphia Athletics (1884–1885)	
Joe Straub	June 24, 1880	September 22, 1883	catcher	Troy Trojans (1880); Philadelphia Athletics (1882); Columbus Buckeyes (1883)	
Marty Swandell	May 7, 1872	August 7, 1873	third baseman	Brooklyn Eckfords (1863–1867); New York Mutuals (1868–1870); Brooklyn Eckfords (1872); Elizabeth Resolutes (1873)	

=== German Empire ===
The German Empire refers to Germany from the unification of Germany and proclamation of Wilhelm I as German Emperor on 18 January 1871 to 1918, when it became a federal republic after defeat in World War I and the abdication of Wilhelm II (9 November 1918).

Name	Debut	Final game	Position	Teams	Ref
Heinz Becker	April 21, 1943	May 9, 1947	first baseman	Chicago Cubs (1943, 1945–1946); Cleveland Indians (1946–1947)	
Fritz Buelow	September 28, 1899	July 13, 1907	catcher	St. Louis Perfectos/Cardinals (1899–1900); Detroit Tigers (1901–1904); Cleveland Naps (1904–1906); St. Louis Browns (1907)	
Pep Deininger	April 26, 1902	October 7, 1909	pitcher, outfielder	Boston Americans (1902); Philadelphia Phillies (1908–1909)	
Ed Eiteljorge	May 2, 1890	August 27, 1891	pitcher	Chicago Colts (1890); Washington Statesmen (1891)	
Fred Gaiser	September 3, 1908	September 3, 1908	pitcher	St. Louis Cardinals (1908)	
Jack Katoll	September 9, 1898	September 29, 1902	pitcher	Chicago Orphans (1898–1899); Chicago White Sox (1901–1902); Baltimore Orioles (1902)	
Ben Koehler	April 23, 1905	October 7, 1906	outfielder	St. Louis Browns (1905–1906)	
Marty Krug	May 29, 1912	September 27, 1922	third baseman	Boston Red Sox (1912); Chicago Cubs (1922)	
Bill Miller	August 23, 1902	August 23, 1902	outfielder	Pittsburgh Pirates (1902)	
Fritz Mollwitz	September 26, 1913	September 28, 1919	first baseman	Chicago Cubs, Cincinnati Reds, Chicago Cubs, Pittsburgh Pirates, St. Louis Cardinals	
Reggie Richter	May 30, 1911	September 26, 1911	pitcher	Chicago Cubs (1911)	
Skel Roach	August 9, 1899	August 9, 1899	pitcher	Chicago Orphans (1899)	
Dutch Schesler	April 16, 1931	August 12, 1931	pitcher	Philadelphia Phillies (1931)	
Dutch Schliebner	April 17, 1923	October 7, 1923	first baseman	Brooklyn Robins, St. Louis Browns	
Bun Troy	September 15, 1912	September 15, 1912	pitcher	Detroit Tigers	
Tony Welzer	April 13, 1926	September 21, 1927	pitcher	Boston Red Sox	
Bill Zimmerman	April 14, 1915	July 9, 1915	outfielder	Brooklyn Robins	

=== Soviet Zone of Germany ===
The Soviet Occupation Zone was the area of central Germany occupied by the Soviet Union from 1945 on, at the end of World War II. On 7 October 1949 the German Democratic Republic, which became commonly referred to as East Germany, was established in the Soviet Occupation Zone.

Name	Debut	Final game	Position	Teams	Ref
Mickey Scott	May 6, 1972	June 6, 1977	pitcher	Baltimore Orioles, Montreal Expos, California Angels	

=== West Germany ===
West Germany is the common English name for the Federal Republic of Germany or FRG in the period between its creation in May 1949 to German reunification on 3 October 1990. During this period, the NATO-aligned West Germany and the socialist East Germany were divided by the Inner German border. This situation ended when East Germany was dissolved and its five states joined the ten states of the Federal Republic of Germany along with the reunified city-state of Berlin.

Name	Debut	Final game	Position	Teams	Ref
Jeff Baker	April 4, 2005	July 7, 2015	utility	Colorado Rockies, Chicago Cubs, Detroit Tigers, Atlanta Braves, Texas Rangers, Miami Marlins	
Rob Belloir	August 2, 1975	September 29, 1978	infielder	Atlanta Braves	
Mike Blowers	September 1, 1989	October 3, 1999	Third Baseman	New York Yankees, Seattle Mariners, Los Angeles Dodgers, Oakland Athletics	
Bob Davidson	July 15, 1989	July 15, 1989	Pitcher	New York Yankees	
Ron Gardenhire	September 1, 1981	October 6, 1985,	Shortstop	New York Mets	
Glenn Hubbard	July 14, 1978	July 29, 1989	Second baseman	Atlanta Braves, Oakland Athletics	
Edwin Jackson	September 9, 2003	September 28, 2019	Pitcher	Los Angeles Dodgers, Tampa Bay Rays, Detroit Tigers, Arizona Diamondbacks, Chicago White Sox, St. Louis Cardinals, Washington Nationals, Chicago Cubs, Atlanta Braves, Miami Marlins, San Diego Padres	
Steve Kent	April 4, 2002	September 22, 2002	Pitcher	Tampa Bay Devil Rays	
Craig Lefferts	April 7, 1983	July 3, 1994	Pitcher	Chicago Cubs, San Diego Padres, San Francisco Giants, Baltimore Orioles, Texas Rangers, California Angels	
Tom McCarthy	July 5, 1985	September 22, 1989	Pitcher	Boston Red Sox, Chicago White Sox	
Dave Pavlas	August 21, 1990	September 29, 1996	Pitcher	Chicago Cubs, New York Yankees	
Tobi Stoner	September 8, 2009	April 18, 2010	Pitcher	New York Mets	
Stefan Wever	September 17, 1982	September 17, 1982	Pitcher	New York Yankees	

=== Germany ===
Germany is the English short name for the Federal Republic of Germany, the enlarged continuation of West Germany following German reunification in 1990.

Name	Debut	Final game	Position	Teams	Ref
Aaron Altherr	June 16, 2014		Outfielder	Philadelphia Phillies, San Francisco Giants, New York Mets	
Max Kepler	September 27, 2015		Outfielder	Minnesota Twins, Philadelphia Phillies, Arizona Diamondbacks	

== Ireland ==
Covers players born in the Republic of Ireland and also those born in the United Kingdom of Great Britain and Ireland prior to partition. At present, all players here were born prior to 1922, so are also included in the category of Major League Baseball players born in the United Kingdom.

Name	Debut	Final game	Position	Teams	Ref
Jimmy Archer	September 6, 1904	September 2, 1918	Catcher	Pittsburgh Pirates, Detroit Tigers, Chicago Cubs, Brooklyn Robins, Cincinnati Reds	
Tommy Bond	May 5, 1874	August 11, 1884	Pitcher	Brooklyn Atlantics, Hartford Dark Blues, Boston Red Caps, Worcester Ruby Legs, Boston Reds, Indianapolis Hoosiers	
Hugh Campbell	April 28, 1873	July 23, 1873	Pitcher	Elizabeth Resolutes	
Mike Campbell	April 28, 1873	July 23, 1873	First Baseman	Elizabeth Resolutes	
Joe Cleary	August 4, 1945	August 4, 1945	Pitcher	Washington Senators	
Bill Collins	August 1, 1887	September 12, 1892	Catcher	New York Metropolitans, Philadelphia Athletics, Cleveland Spiders	
John Curran	September 12, 1876	September 15, 1876	Catcher	Philadelphia Athletics	
Andy Cusick	August 21, 1884	June 15, 1887	Catcher	Wilmington Quicksteps, Philadelphia Quakers	
Hugh Daily	May 1, 1882	August 21, 1887	Pitcher	Buffalo Bisons, Cleveland Blues, Chicago Browns, Washington Nationals (UA), St. Louis Maroons, Washington Nationals, Blues	
Pete Daniels	April 19, 1890	May 31, 1898	Pitcher	Pittsburgh Alleghenys, St. Louis Browns	
Cozy Dolan	April 26, 1895	October 5, 1906	Right fielder / First baseman / Pitcher	Boston Beaneaters, Chicago Orphans, Brooklyn Superbas, Chicago White Sox, Cincinnati Reds	
Patsy Donovan	April 19, 1890	October 5, 1907	Right Fielder	Boston Beaneaters, Brooklyn Bridegrooms, Louisville Colonels, Washington Senators (NL), Pittsburgh Pirates, St. Louis Cardinals, Washington Senators, Brooklyn Superbas	
Tom Dowse	April 21, 1890	October 12, 1892	Catcher	Cleveland Spiders, Columbus Solons, Louisville Colonels, Cincinnati Reds, Philadelphia Phillies, Washington Senators	
Conny Doyle	June 23, 1883	September 13, 1884	Left Fielder	Philadelphia Quakers, Pittsburgh Alleghenys	
Jack Doyle	August 27, 1889	July 13, 1905	First Baseman	Columbus Solons, Cleveland Spiders, New York Giants, Baltimore Orioles, Washington Senators (NL), Chicago Orphans, Washington Senators, Brooklyn Superbas, Philadelphia Phillies, New York Highlanders	
Ed Duffy	May 8, 1871	October 30, 1871	Shortstop	Chicago White Stockings	
Bill Farmer	May 1, 1888	August 24, 1888	Catcher	Pittsburgh Alleghenys, Philadelphia Athletics	
Jocko Fields	May 31, 1887	June 11, 1892	Outfielder	Pittsburgh Alleghenys, Pittsburgh Burghers, Pittsburgh Pirates, Philadelphia Phillies, New York Giants	
Mike Flynn	August 31, 1891	August 31, 1891	Catcher	Boston Reds	
Curry Foley	May 31, 1879	September 5, 1883	Outfielder / Pitcher / First baseman	Boston Red Caps, Buffalo Bisons	
Jimmy Hallinan	July 26, 1871	August 22, 1878	Shortstop	Fort Wayne Kekiongas, Keokuk Westerns, New York Mutuals, Cincinnati Reds, Chicago White Stockings, Indianapolis Blues	
Mike Hines	May 1, 1883	August 18, 1888	Catcher	Boston Beaneaters, Brooklyn Grays, Providence Grays	
Andy Leonard	May 5, 1871	July 6, 1880	Outfielder	Washington Olympics, Boston Red Stockings/Red Caps, Cincinnati Stars	
Con Lucid	May 1, 1893	August 15, 1897	Pitcher	Louisville Colonels, Brooklyn Grooms, Philadelphia Phillies, St. Louis Browns	
Charlie McCullough	April 23, 1890	August 29, 1890	Pitcher	Brooklyn Gladiators, Syracuse Stars	
John McGuinness	May 6, 1876	August 7, 1884	First baseman	New York Mutuals, Syracuse Stars, Philadelphia Keystones	
Barney McLaughlin	August 2, 1884	August 12, 1890	Infielder	Kansas City Cowboys, Philadelphia Quakers, Syracuse Stars	
Pat McManus	May 22, 1879	August 13, 1879	Pitcher	Troy Trojans	
Mike Muldoon	May 1, 1882	October 10, 1886	Third baseman	Cleveland Blues, Baltimore Orioles	
Tony Mullane	August 27, 1881	July 26, 1894	Pitcher	Detroit Wolverines, Louisville Eclipse, St. Louis Browns, Toledo Blue Stockings, Cincinnati Red Stockings/Reds, Baltimore Orioles, Cleveland Spiders	
Tom Needham	May 12, 1904	July 8, 1914	Catcher	Boston Beaneaters/Doves, New York Giants, Chicago Cubs	
Johnny O'Connor	September 16, 1916	September 16, 1916	Catcher	Chicago Cubs	
Paddy O'Connor	April 17, 1908	July 22, 1918	Catcher	Pittsburgh Pirates, St. Louis Cardinals, Pittsburgh Rebels, New York Yankees	
Fancy O'Neil	October 23, 1874	October 23, 1874	Right fielder	Hartford Dark Blues	
Jack O'Neill	April 21, 1902	October 3, 1906	Catcher	St. Louis Cardinals, Chicago Cubs, Boston Beaneaters	
Mike O'Neill	September 20, 1901	October 6, 1907	Pitcher/Outfielder	St. Louis Cardinals, Cincinnati Reds	
Cyclone Ryan	August 8, 1887	May 8, 1891	First baseman/Pitcher	New York Metropolitans, Boston Beaneaters	
Bill Sullivan	Outfielder	August 9, 1878	August 9, 1878	Chicago White Stockings	
Sleeper Sullivan	May 3, 1881	May 10, 1884	Catcher	Buffalo Bisons, St. Louis Brown Stockings/Browns, Louisville Eclipse, St. Louis Maroons	
Ted Sullivan	July 16, 1884	October 18, 1884	Right fielder	Kansas City Cowboys	
Jimmy Walsh	August 26, 1912	October 4, 1917	Outfielder	Philadelphia Athletics, New York Yankees, Boston Red Sox	

== Italy ==
=== Kingdom of Italy ===
The Kingdom of Italy was a state forged in 1861 by the unification of Italy. It existed until 1946 when the Italians opted for a republican constitution.

Name	Debut	Final game	Position	Teams	Ref
Al Campanis	September 23, 1943	October 3, 1943	Second Base	Brooklyn Dodgers	
Rugger Ardizoia	April 30, 1947	April 30, 1947	Pitcher	New York Yankees	
Reno Bertoia	September 22, 1953	April 28, 1962	Third Baseman	Detroit Tigers, Washington Senators, Minnesota Twins, Kansas City Athletics	
Hank Biasatti	April 23, 1949	October 2, 1949	First Baseman	Philadelphia Athletics	
Julio Bonetti	April 22, 1937	April 22, 1940	Pitcher	Saint Louis Browns, Chicago Cubs	
Marino Pieretti	April 19, 1945	October 1, 1950	Pitcher	Washington Senators, Chicago White Sox, Cleveland Indians	
Lou Polli	April 18, 1932	July 7, 1944	Pitcher	Saint Louis Browns, New York Giants	

=== The Republic of Italy ===
Italy became a republic after a referendum held on 2 June 1946, a day since celebrated as Republic Day.

Name	Debut	Final game	Position	Teams	Ref
Alex Liddi	September 7, 2011	June 17, 2013	Third Baseman	Seattle Mariners	
Samuel Aldegheri	August 30, 2024		Pitcher	Los Angeles Angels	

== Lithuania ==
Name	Debut	Final game	Position	Teams	Ref
Dovydas Neverauskas	April 25, 2017		Pitcher	Pittsburgh Pirates	

== Netherlands ==
Name	Debut	Final game	Position	Teams	Ref
Bert Blyleven	June 5, 1970	October 4, 1992	Pitcher	Minnesota Twins, Texas Rangers, Pittsburgh Pirates, Cleveland Indians, California Angels	
Robert Eenhoorn	April 27, 1994	September 28, 1997	Second Baseman, Shortstop and Third Baseman	New York Yankees. California Angels, Anaheim Angels	
Rikkert Faneyte	August 29, 1993	May 29, 1996	Outfielder	San Francisco Giants, Texas Rangers	
Didi Gregorius	September 5, 2012		Shortstop and Second Baseman	Cincinnati Reds, Arizona Diamondbacks, New York Yankees, Philadelphia Phillies	
Greg Halman	September 23, 2010	August 3, 2011	Outfielder	Seattle Mariners	
John Houseman	September 11, 1894	October 3, 1897	Second Baseman, Outfielder and Shortstop	Chicago Colts, St. Louis Browns	
Win Remmerswaal	Augusts 3, 1979	October 5, 1980	Pitcher	Boston Red Sox	
Rick van den Hurk	April 10, 2007	October 3, 2012	Pitcher	Florida Marlins, Baltimore Orioles, Pittsburgh Pirates	
Rynie Wolters	May 18, 1871	April 28, 1873	Pitcher and Right fielder	New York Mutuals, Cleveland Forest Citys, Elizabeth Resolutes	

== Norway ==
Name	Debut	Final game	Position	Teams	Ref
John Anderson	September 8, 1894	October 2, 1908	Outfielder/First baseman	Brooklyn Bridegrooms/Brooklyn Superbas, Washington Senators, Milwaukee Brewers, St. Louis Browns, New York Highlanders, Chicago White Sox	
Arndt Jorgens	April 26, 1929	August 2, 1939	Catcher	New York Yankees	
Jimmy Wiggs	April 23, 1903	May 25, 1906	Pitcher	Cincinnati Reds, Detroit Tigers	

== Poland ==
Name	Debut	Final game	Position	Teams	Ref
Moe Drabowsky	August 7, 1956	September 19, 1972	Reliever	Chicago Cubs, Milwaukee Braves, Cincinnati Reds, Kansas City Athletics, Baltimore Orioles, Kansas City Royals, St. Louis Cardinals, Chicago White Sox	
Nap Kloza	August 16, 1931	June 26, 1932	Outfielder	St. Louis Browns	
Henry Peploski	September 19, 1929	October 6, 1929	Third Baseman	Boston Braves	
Johnny Reder	April 16, 1932	June 12, 1932	First Baseman and Third Baseman	Boston Red Sox	

== Portugal ==
Name	Debut	Final game	Position	Teams	Ref
Frank Thompson	April 26, 1875	September 11, 1875	Catcher	Brooklyn Atlantics (1875); Washington Nationals (1875)	
Isaiah Campbell	July 27, 2023		Pitcher	Seattle Mariners, Boston Red Sox	

== Russia ==
=== Russian Empire ===
Name	Debut	Final game	Position	Teams	Ref
Eddie Ainsmith	August 9, 1910	July 21, 1924	Catcher	Washington Senators, Detroit Tigers, St. Louis Cardinals, Brooklyn Robins, New York Giants	
Jake Gettman	August 20, 1897	May 19, 1899	Outfielder	Washington Senators	
Jake Livingstone	September 6, 1901	September 9, 1901	Pitcher	New York Giants	
Rube Schauer	August 27, 1913	September 29, 1917	Pitcher	New York Giants, Philadelphia Athletics	
Joe Zapustas	September 28, 1933	September 30, 1933	Outfielder	Philadelphia Athletics	

=== Soviet Union ===
The Union of Soviet Socialist Republics (USSR) was a constitutionally socialist state that existed in Eurasia from 1922 to 1991. The common short name is Soviet Union

Name	Debut	Final game	Position	Teams	Ref
Victor Cole	June 6, 1992	July 9, 1992	Pitcher	Pittsburgh Pirates	

== Slovakia ==
=== Czechoslovakia ===
Czechoslovakia was a sovereign state in Central Europe which existed from October 1918, when it declared its independence from the Austro-Hungarian Empire, until 1992. On 1 January 1993 Czechoslovakia peacefully split into the Czech Republic and Slovakia.

Name	Debut	Final game	Position	Teams	Ref
Carl Linhart †	August 2, 1952	September 19, 1952	Pinch hitter	Detroit Tigers	
Elmer Valo	September 22, 1940	October 1, 1961	Outfielder	Philadelphia Athletics, Kansas City Athletics, Philadelphia Phillies, Brooklyn Dodgers, Los Angeles Dodgers, Cleveland Indians, New York Yankees, Washington Senators, Minnesota Twins, Philadelphia Phillies	

† Carl Linhart was born in a town called Zborov. Since there are towns of that name in both Slovakia and the Czech Republic, it is unclear which current nation can claim him.

== Spain ==
Name	Debut	Final game	Position	Teams	Ref
Al Cabrera	May 16, 1913	May 16, 1913	Shortstop	St. Louis Cardinals	
Bryan Oelkers	April 9, 1983	October 3, 1986	Pitcher	Minnesota Twins, Cleveland Indians	
Al Pardo	July 3, 1985	September 9, 1989	Catcher	Baltimore Orioles, Philadelphia Phillies	
Danny Rios	May 30, 1997	May 2, 1998	Pitcher	New York Yankees, Kansas City Royals	

== Sweden ==
Name	Debut	Final game	Position	Teams	Ref
Charlie Bold	August 24, 1914	August 28, 1914	First baseman	St. Louis Browns	
Eric Erickson	October 6, 1914	September 29, 1922	Pitcher	New York Giants, Detroit Tigers, Washington Senators	
Charlie Hallstrom	September 23, 1885	September 23, 1885	Pitcher	Providence Grays	
Axel Lindstrom	October 3, 1916	October 3, 1916	Pitcher	Philadelphia Athletics	

== Switzerland ==
Name	Debut	Final game	Position	Teams	Ref
Otto Hess	August 3, 1902	June 13, 1915	Pitcher/Outfielder	Cleveland Naps, Boston Braves	

== United Kingdom ==
=== England ===
England is one of the four constituent nations of the United Kingdom. It shares land borders with Scotland to the north and Wales to the west; the Irish Sea is to the north west, the Celtic Sea to the south west and the North Sea to the east, with the English Channel to the south separating it from continental Europe. Most of England comprises the central and southern part of the island of Great Britain in the North Atlantic.

Name	Debut	Final game	Position	Teams	Ref
Dave Brain	April 24, 1901	October 7, 1908	infielder/outfielder	Chicago White Sox, St. Louis Cardinals, Pittsburgh Pirates, Boston Beaneaters, Cincinnati Reds, New York Giants	
Tom Brown	July 6, 1882	May 17, 1898	pitcher/outfielder	Baltimore Orioles, Columbus Buckeyes, Pittsburgh Alleghenys, Indianapolis Hoosiers, Boston Beaneaters, Boston Reds, Louisville Colonels, St. Louis Browns, Washington Senators	
Walter Carlisle	May 8, 1908	May 11, 1908	outfielder	Boston Red Sox	
Bobby Clack	May 13, 1874	1876	outfielder	Brooklyn Atlantics, Cincinnati Reds	
Ed Cogswell	July 11, 1879	May 30, 1882	first baseman	Boston Red Caps, Troy Trojans, Worcester Ruby Legs	
Danny Cox	August 6, 1983	September 18, 1995	pitcher	St. Louis Cardinals, Philadelphia Phillies, Toronto Blue Jays	
Ned Crompton	September 13, 1909	October 8, 1910	outfielder	St. Louis Browns, Cincinnati Reds	
Hobe Ferris	April 26, 1901	October 1, 1909	second base, third base	Boston Americans, St. Louis Browns	
Dennis Fitzgerald	April 17, 1890	April 18, 1890	shortstop	Philadelphia Athletics	
George William Hall	May 5, 1871	October 6, 1877	outfielder	Washington Olympics, Baltimore Canaries, Boston Red Stockings, Philadelphia Athletics, Louisville Grays	
Jim Halpin	June 15, 1882	August 26, 1885	shortstop	Worcester Worcesters, Washington Nationals (UA), Detroit Wolverines	
Charlie Hanford	April 13, 1914	September 30, 1915	outfielder	Buffalo Buffeds, Chicago Whales	
Pete Hasney	September 13, 1890	September 13, 1890	outfielder	Philadelphia Athletics	
Dick Higham	June 1, 1871	March 25, 1880	Umpire, Right Fielder	New York Mutuals, Baltimore Canaries, New York Mutuals, Chicago White Stockings, Hartford Dark Blues, Providence Grays, Troy Trojans	
Marty Hogan	August 6, 1894	April 24, 1895	Right Fielder	Cincinnati Reds, St. Louis Browns	
Sam Jackson	May 9, 1871	May 7, 1872	Second base	Boston Red Stockings, Brooklyn Atlantics	
Keith Lampard	September 15, 1969	October 1, 1970	Outfielder	Houston Astros	
Alfred Lawson	May 13, 1890	June 2, 1890	Pitcher	Boston Beaneaters, Pittsburgh Alleghenys	
Tim Manning	May 1, 1882	July 20, 1885	Second basemen	Providence Grays, Baltimore Orioles	
Paul Marak	September 1, 1990	October 2, 1990	Pitcher	Atlanta Braves	
Al Nichols	April 24, 1875	September 26, 1877	Third basemen	Brooklyn Atlantics, New York Mutuals, Louisville Grays	
Lance Painter	May 19, 1993	September 9, 2003	Reliever	Colorado Rockies, St. Louis Cardinals, Toronto Blue Jays, Milwaukee Brewers	
Al Reach	May 20, 1871	May 21, 1875	Right Fielder, Second Baseman, First Baseman, Manager	Brooklyn Eckfords, Philadelphia Athletics	
Les Rohr	September 19, 1967	September 19, 1969	Pitcher	New York Mets	
Al Shaw	June 8, 1901	September 13, 1909	Catcher	Detroit Tigers, Boston Americans, Chicago White Sox, Boston Doves	
Harry Smith	July 11, 1901	September 15, 1910	Catcher, Manager	Philadelphia Athletics, Pittsburgh Pirates, Boston Doves	
Klondike Smith	September 28, 1912	October 5, 1912	Outfielder	New York Highlanders	
Phil Stockman*	June 15, 2006	June 11, 2008	Pitcher	Atlanta Braves	
Al Thake	June 13, 1872	August 28, 1872	Left Field	Brooklyn Atlantics	
Ed Walker	September 26, 1902	June 21, 1903	Pitcher	Cleveland Bronchos/Naps	
Sam White	September 8, 1919	September 8, 1919	Catcher	Boston Braves	
Harry Wright	May 5, 1871	September 29, 1877	Center Field, Pitcher, Manager	New York Knickerbockers, Gotham of New York, Cincinnati Red Stockings, Boston Red Stockings, Boston Red Caps	
Jim Wright	September 14, 1927	May 4, 1928	Pitcher	St. Louis Browns	

=== Scotland ===
Scotland is one of the four constituent nations of the United Kingdom. It shares a land borders with England to the south and comprises the northern part of the island of Great Britain in the North Atlantic.

Name	Debut	Final game	Position	Teams	Ref
George Chalmers	September 21, 1910	August 7, 1916	Pitcher	Philadelphia Phillies	
Mike Hopkins	August 24, 1902	August 24, 1902	Catcher	Pittsburgh Pirates	
Mac MacArthur	May 2, 1884	June 9, 1884	Pitcher	Indianapolis Hoosiers	
Jim McCormick	May 20, 1878	October 7, 1887	Pitcher, Manager	Indianapolis Blues, Cleveland Blues, Cincinnati Outlaw Reds, Providence Grays, Chicago White Stockings, Pittsburgh Alleghenys	
Hugh Nicol	May 3, 1881	August 2, 1890	Outfielder	Chicago White Stockings, St. Louis Browns, Cincinnati Red Stockings, Cincinnati Reds	
Bobby Thomson	September 9, 1946	July 17, 1960	Outfielder	New York Giants, Milwaukee Braves, Chicago Cubs, Boston Red Sox, Baltimore Orioles	
Tom Waddell	April 15, 1984	April 20, 1987	Pitcher	Cleveland Indians	

=== Northern Ireland ===
Northern Ireland is one of the four constituent nations of the United Kingdom. It shares a land border with the Republic of Ireland to the south and is one of two nations on the island of Ireland.

See also Ireland (above) as all players on that list were born in the United Kingdom of Great Britain and Ireland prior to partition, prior to 1922.

Name	Debut	Final game	Position	Teams	Ref
P. J. Conlon	May 7, 2018	July 10, 2018	Pitcher	New York Mets	
Reddy Mack	September 16, 1885	September 30, 1890	Second baseman	Louisville Colonels, Baltimore Orioles	
Fergy Malone	May 20, 1871	April 17, 1884	Catcher	Philadelphia Athletics, Philadelphia White Stockings, Chicago White Stockings, Philadelphia Keystones	
Irish McIlveen	July 6, 1906	May 6, 1909	Outfielder	Pittsburgh Pirates, New York Highlanders	
Sam Nicholl	October 5, 1888	May 4, 1890	Outfielder	Pittsburgh Alleghenys, Columbus Solons	
John Tener	June 8, 1885	October 4, 1890	Pitcher/Outfielder	Baltimore Orioles, Chicago White Stockings, Pittsburgh Burghers	

=== Wales ===
Wales is one of the four constituent nations of the United Kingdom. It shares a land borders with England to the east; to the west is the Irish Sea.

Name	Debut	Final game	Position	Teams	Ref
Jimmy Austin	April 19, 1909	October 26, 1929	Third basemen and Shortstop, Coach	New York Highlanders, St. Louis Browns	
Ted Lewis	July 6, 1896	September 26, 1901	Pitcher	Boston Beaneaters, Boston Americans	
Pete Morris	May 14, 1884	May 14, 1884	Shortstop	Washington Nationals (UA)	
