= 1878 Chicago White Stockings season =

1878 Chicago White Stockings
- League: National League
- Ballpark: Lakefront Park
- City: Chicago
- Record: 30–30 (.500)
- League place: 4th
- Owner: William Hulbert
- Manager: Bob Ferguson

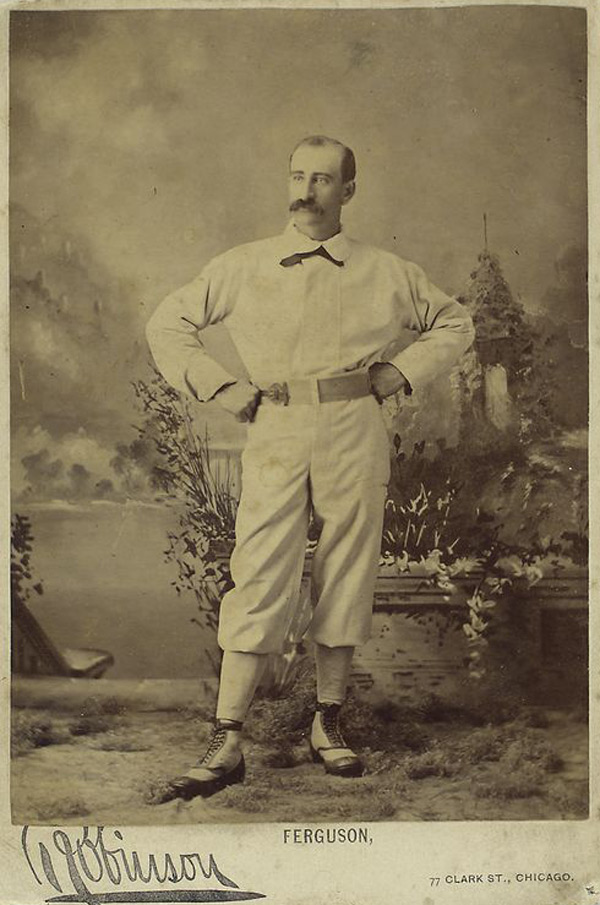
Manager Bob Ferguson circa 1878

The 1878 Chicago White Stockings season was the seventh season of the Chicago White Stockings franchise, the third in the National League and the first at Lakefront Park. The White Stockings finished fourth in the National League with a record of 30–30.

== Regular season ==
=== Season standings ===
National League
Team	W	L	Pct.	GB	Home	Road
Boston Red Caps	41	19	.683	—	23‍–‍7	18‍–‍12
Cincinnati Reds	37	23	.617	4	25‍–‍8	12‍–‍15
Providence Grays	33	27	.550	8	17‍–‍13	16‍–‍14
Chicago White Stockings	30	30	.500	11	17‍–‍18	13‍–‍12
Indianapolis Blues	24	36	.400	17	10‍–‍17	14‍–‍19
Milwaukee Grays	15	45	.250	26	7‍–‍18	8‍–‍27

=== Record vs. opponents ===
1878 National League record Sources:
Team	BSN	CHI	CIN	IND	MIL	PRO
Boston	—	8–4	6–6	10–2	11–1	6–6
Chicago	4–8	—	2–10	8–4	10–2	6–6–1
Cincinnati	6–6	10–2	—	4–8–1	8–4	9–3
Indianapolis	2–10	4–8	8–4–1	—	8–4–1	2–10–1
Milwaukee	1–11	2–10	4–8	4–8–1	—	4–8
Providence	6–6	6–6–1	3–9	10–2–1	8–4	—

=== Roster ===
1878 Chicago White Stockings
Roster
Pitchers: Terry Larkin; Laurie Reis	Catchers: Bill Harbridge; Phil Powers; Bill Traffley; Infielders: Bob Ferguson; Frank Hankinson; Bill McClellan; Albert Spalding; Joe Start	Outfielders: Cap Anson; John Cassidy; Jimmy Hallinan; Jack Remsen; Bill Sullivan	Manager: Bob Ferguson

== Player stats ==
=== Batting ===
==== Starters by position ====
Note: Pos = Position; G = Games played; AB = At bats; H = Hits; Avg. = Batting average; HR = Home runs; RBI = Runs batted in

Pos	Player	G	AB	H	Avg.	HR	RBI
C	Bill Harbridge	54	240	71	.296	0	37
1B	Joe Start	61	285	100	.351	1	27
2B	Bill McClellan	48	205	46	.224	0	29
3B	Frank Hankinson	58	240	64	.267	1	27
SS	Bob Ferguson	61	259	91	.351	0	39
OF	John Cassidy	60	256	68	.266	0	29
OF	Jack Remsen	56	224	52	.232	1	19
OF	Cap Anson	60	261	89	.341	0	40

==== Other batters ====
Note: G = Games played; AB = At bats; H = Hits; Avg. = Batting average; HR = Home runs; RBI = Runs batted in

Player	G	AB	H	Avg.	HR	RBI
Jimmy Hallinan	16	67	19	.284	0	2
Phil Powers	8	31	5	.161	0	2
Bill Traffley	2	9	1	.111	0	1
Bill Sullivan	2	6	1	.167	0	0
Albert Spalding	1	4	2	.500	0	0

=== Pitching ===
==== Starting pitchers ====
Note: G = Games pitched; IP = Innings pitched; W = Wins; L = Losses; ERA = Earned run average; SO = Strikeouts

Player	G	IP	W	L	ERA	SO
Terry Larkin	56	506.0	29	26	2.24	163
Laurie Reis	4	36.0	1	3	3.25	8
Frank Hankinson	1	9.0	0	1	6.00	4
