= Joe Cleary =

American baseball player (1918-2004)

- Pitcher
- Born: December 3, 1918; Cork, Ireland
- Died: June 3, 2004 (aged 85); Yonkers, New York, U.S.
- Batted: Right Threw: Right

MLB debut
- August 4, 1945, for the Washington Senators

Last MLB appearance
- August 4, 1945, for the Washington Senators

MLB statistics
- Win–loss record: 0–0
- Earned run average: 189.00
- Strikeouts: 1
- Stats at Baseball Reference

Teams
- Washington Senators (1945)

Joseph Christopher Cleary (December 3, 1918 – June 3, 2004), nicknamed "Fire", was an American professional baseball pitcher who played one major league game, in 1945. The right-hander was born in Cork, and he was the last native of Ireland or Northern Ireland to appear in a major league game until P. J. Conlon debuted for the New York Mets on May 7, 2018. He also holds the major league record for the highest ERA of any pitcher who retired a batter.

== Major league career ==
Cleary pitched one game in relief for the Washington Senators on August 4, 1945. In the 4th inning of game 2 of a doubleheader against the Boston Red Sox, he gave up 8 baserunners (5 hits and 3 walks) and 7 earned runs in just 1/3 of an inning. The only out that he recorded was a strikeout of opposing pitcher Dave Ferriss.

In Cleary's short MLB career he had a 0–0 record with 1 strikeout and an ERA of 189.00.

== Personal life ==
Joe Cleary was born in 1918 in Cork, Ireland and moved to the Upper West Side of New York City in 1928. Cleary attended Commerce High School where he played baseball, once headlining The New York Times. Later, while still enrolled at Commerce, Cleary played on various semi-professional teams in Brooklyn in order to supplement his father's income. Such teams included the Brooklyn Bay Parkways and the Puerto Rican Stars.

He died in 2004 at the age of 85 in Yonkers, New York.

== See also ==
- List of players from Ireland in Major League Baseball
