= 1878 Cincinnati Reds season =

1878 Cincinnati Reds
- League: National League
- Ballpark: Avenue Grounds
- City: Cincinnati
- Record: 37–23 (.617)
- League place: 2nd
- Manager: Cal McVey

The 1878 Cincinnati Reds season was a season in American baseball. The team finished second in the National League with a record of 37–23, four games behind the Boston Red Caps.

== Regular season ==
After finishing their first two seasons in the National League in last place, the Reds were hoping for some improvement in the 1878 season. Cincinnati signed Cal McVey of the Chicago White Stockings to become the team's new third baseman, and new manager. Catcher Deacon White of the Boston Red Caps signed with Cincinnati. White led the National League with a .387 batting average, 103 hits, eleven triples, 49 RBI, and a .545 slugging percentage with the Red Caps in 1877. White also led the National League with 60 RBI while playing for the White Stockings in 1876. On the mound, 23-year-old Will White was signed by the Reds. White appeared in three games with the Boston Red Caps in 1877, going 2–1 with a 3.00 ERA.

Charley Jones had another very solid season with the Reds, as he had a .310 batting average, along with a team high three home runs and 39 RBI. White saw his production slip, however, he still hit .314 with 29 RBI. Player-manager McVey was solid with a .306 average and two home runs along with 28 RBI. Rookie King Kelly hit .283 with 27 RBI. White had a spectacular season, going 30–21 with a 1.79 ERA in 468 innings pitched.

=== Season summary ===
The Reds opened the season with a six-game winning streak, and stayed hot in their first twenty games, going 15–5, and were sitting in first place in the National League. Cincinnati then went on a six-game losing streak, falling to 15–11, and out of first place. The Reds never reclaimed first place; however, they finished the season strong, including a nine-game winning streak late in the year, to finish in second place with a 37–23 record, five games behind the first place Boston Red Caps.

=== Season standings ===
National League
Team	W	L	Pct.	GB	Home	Road
Boston Red Caps	41	19	.683	—	23‍–‍7	18‍–‍12
Cincinnati Reds	37	23	.617	4	25‍–‍8	12‍–‍15
Providence Grays	33	27	.550	8	17‍–‍13	16‍–‍14
Chicago White Stockings	30	30	.500	11	17‍–‍18	13‍–‍12
Indianapolis Blues	24	36	.400	17	10‍–‍17	14‍–‍19
Milwaukee Grays	15	45	.250	26	7‍–‍18	8‍–‍27

=== Record vs. opponents ===
1878 National League record Sources:
Team	BSN	CHI	CIN	IND	MIL	PRO
Boston	—	8–4	6–6	10–2	11–1	6–6
Chicago	4–8	—	2–10	8–4	10–2	6–6–1
Cincinnati	6–6	10–2	—	4–8–1	8–4	9–3
Indianapolis	2–10	4–8	8–4–1	—	8–4–1	2–10–1
Milwaukee	1–11	2–10	4–8	4–8–1	—	4–8
Providence	6–6	6–6–1	3–9	10–2–1	8–4	—

=== Game log ===
Legend
Reds Win	Reds Loss	Game Tied/Postponed

1878 Game Log: 37–23 (Home: 25–8; Away: 12–15)
May: 11–3 (Home: 7–1; Away: 4–2)

#	Date	Opponent	Score	Stadium	Attendance	Record	Streak
1	May 1	Milwaukee Grays	6–4	Avenue Grounds	N/A	1–0	W1
2	May 2	Milwaukee Grays	6–2	Avenue Grounds	N/A	2–0	W2
3	May 4	Milwaukee Grays	4–1	Avenue Grounds	N/A	3–0	W3
4	May 7	White Stockings	4–3	Avenue Grounds	N/A	4–0	W4
5	May 9	White Stockings	9–1	Avenue Grounds	N/A	5–0	W5
6	May 11	White Stockings	4–1	Avenue Grounds	N/A	6–0	W6
7	May 14	@ Milwaukee Grays	5–8	Eclipse Park	N/A	6–1	L1
8	May 16	@ Milwaukee Grays	8–12	Eclipse Park	N/A	6–2	L2
9	May 18	@ Milwaukee Grays	10–2	Eclipse Park	N/A	7–2	W1
10	May 21	@ White Stockings	13–2	Lakefront Park	2,100	8–2	W2
11	May 23	@ White Stockings	7–3	Lakefront Park	2,500	9–2	W3
12	May 25	@ White Stockings	10–8	Lakefront Park	3,000	10–2	W4
13	May 28	Blues	3–11	Avenue Grounds	N/A	10–3	L1
14	May 30	Blues	4–1	Avenue Grounds	N/A	11–3	W1

June: 4–8 (Home: 0–1; Away: 4–7)

#	Date	Opponent	Score	Stadium	Attendance	Record	Streak
15	June 1	Blues	5–6	Avenue Grounds	N/A	11–4	L1
16	June 4	@ Blues	3–9	South Street Park	N/A	11–5	L2
17	June 6	@ Blues	11–4	South Street Park	N/A	12–5	W1
–	June 8	@ Blues	Postponed (rain); Makeup: June 26				
–	June 11	@ Providence Grays	Postponed (unknown reason); Makeup: June 14				
18	June 13	@ Providence Grays	2–0	Messer Street Grounds	N/A	13–5	W2
19	June 14	@ Providence Grays	4–3	Messer Street Grounds	N/A	14–5	W3
20	June 15	@ Providence Grays	11–3	Messer Street Grounds	N/A	15–5	W4
21	June 17	@ Red Caps	2–4	South End Grounds	N/A	15–6	L1
22	June 20	@ Red Caps	0–5	South End Grounds	N/A	15–7	L2
–	June 22	@ Red Caps	Postponed (rain); Makeup: July 22				
–	June 25	@ Blues	Postponed (unknown reason); Makeup: June 28				
23	June 26	@ Blues	1–5	South Street Park	N/A	15–8	L3
24	June 27	@ Blues	3–7	South Street Park	N/A	15–9	L4
25	June 28	@ Blues	5–9	South Street Park	N/A	15–10	L5
26	June 29	@ Blues	2–10	South Street Park	N/A	15–11	L6

July: 7–7 (Home: 6–3; Away: 1–4)

#	Date	Opponent	Score	Stadium	Attendance	Record	Streak
27	July 2	Blues	7–7	Avenue Grounds	N/A	15-11	L6
28	July 4	Blues	5–3	Avenue Grounds	N/A	16–11	W1
29	July 5	Blues	4–3	Avenue Grounds	N/A	17–11	W2
30	July 6	Blues	5–6	Avenue Grounds	N/A	17–12	L1
31	July 9	Providence Grays	12–4	Avenue Grounds	N/A	18–12	W1
32	July 11	Providence Grays	2–13	Avenue Grounds	N/A	18–13	L1
–	July 13	Providence Grays	Postponed (unknown reason); Makeup: July 15				
33	July 15	Providence Grays	13–9	Avenue Grounds	N/A	19–13	W1
34	July 16	Red Caps	5–3	Avenue Grounds	N/A	20–13	W2
35	July 18	Red Caps	4–1	Avenue Grounds	N/A	21–13	W3
36	July 20	Red Caps	0–1	Avenue Grounds	N/A	21–14	L1
37	July 22	@ Red Caps	7–8	South End Grounds	N/A	21–15	L2
38	July 23	@ Red Caps	4–11	South End Grounds	N/A	21–16	L3
39	July 25	@ Red Caps	9–10	South End Grounds	N/A	21–17	L4
40	July 27	@ Red Caps	3–2	South End Grounds	N/A	22–17	W1
–	July 30	@ Providence Grays	Postponed (unknown reason); Makeup: July 31				
41	July 31	@ Providence Grays	3–9	Messer Street Grounds	N/A	22–18	L1

August: 9–4 (Home: 8–3; Away: 1–1)

#	Date	Opponent	Score	Stadium	Attendance	Record	Streak
–	August 1	@ Providence Grays	Postponed (unknown reason); Makeup: August 2				
42	August 2	@ Providence Grays	3–6	Messer Street Grounds	N/A	22–19	L2
43	August 3	@ Providence Grays	4–0	Messer Street Grounds	N/A	23–19	W1
–	August 6	@ Milwaukee Grays	Postponed (unknown reason); Makeup: August 12 (site change)				
–	August 8	@ Milwaukee Grays	Postponed (unknown reason); Makeup: August 14 (site change)				
44	August 10	Milwaukee Grays	9–0	Avenue Grounds	N/A	24–19	W2
45	August 12	Milwaukee Grays	6–5	Avenue Grounds	N/A	25–19	W3
46	August 13	Milwaukee Grays	7–10	Avenue Grounds	N/A	25–20	L1
47	August 14	Milwaukee Grays	5–6	Avenue Grounds	N/A	25–21	L2
48	August 15	Milwaukee Grays	13–2	Avenue Grounds	N/A	26–21	W1
49	August 17	Milwaukee Grays	5–2	Avenue Grounds	N/A	27–21	W2
–	August 20	White Stockings	Postponed (unknown reason); Makeup: August 21				
50	August 21	White Stockings	4–7	Avenue Grounds	N/A	27–22	L1
51	August 22	White Stockings	5–3	Avenue Grounds	N/A	28–22	W1
52	August 24	White Stockings	7–5	Avenue Grounds	N/A	29–22	W2
53	August 27	Providence Grays	5–1	Avenue Grounds	N/A	30–22	W3
54	August 29	Providence Grays	2–0	Avenue Grounds	N/A	31–22	W4
–	August 31	Providence Grays	Postponed (unknown reason); Makeup: September 2				

September: 6–1 (Home: 4–0; Away: 2–1)

#	Date	Opponent	Score	Stadium	Attendance	Record	Streak
55	September 2	Providence Grays	6–2	Avenue Grounds	N/A	32–22	W5
56	September 3	Red Caps	3–0	Avenue Grounds	N/A	33–22	W6
57	September 5	Red Caps	5–2	Avenue Grounds	N/A	34–22	W7
58	September 7	Red Caps	6–1	Avenue Grounds	N/A	35–22	W8
–	September 10	@ White Stockings	Postponed (unknown reason); Makeup: September 11				
59	September 11	@ White Stockings	2–0	Lakefront Park	N/A	36–22	W9
60	September 12	@ White Stockings	2–9	Lakefront Park	N/A	36–23	L1
61	September 14	@ White Stockings	9–6	Lakefront Park	N/A	37–23	W1

=== Roster ===
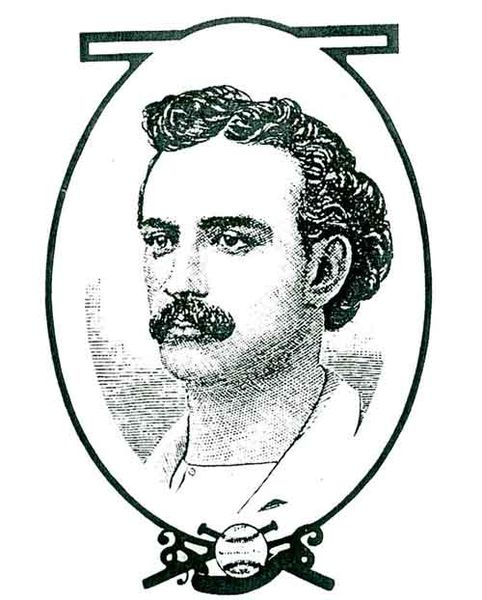
Lip Pike

1878 Cincinnati Reds
Roster
Pitchers: Bobby Mitchell; Will White; Catchers: Deacon White	Infielders: Billy Geer; Joe Gerhardt; Cal McVey; Chub Sullivan	Outfielders: Buttercup Dickerson; Charley Jones; King Kelly; Lip Pike	Manager: Cal McVey

== Player stats ==
=== Batting ===
==== Starters by position ====
Note: Pos = Position; G = Games played; AB = At bats; H = Hits; Avg. = Batting average; HR = Home runs; RBI = Runs batted in

Pos	Player	G	AB	H	Avg.	HR	RBI
C	Deacon White	61	258	81	.314	0	29
1B	Chub Sullivan	61	244	63	.258	0	20
2B	Joe Gerhardt	60	259	77	.297	0	28
3B	Cal McVey	61	271	83	.306	2	28
SS	Billy Geer	61	237	52	.219	0	20
OF	Charley Jones	61	261	81	.310	3	39
OF	King Kelly	60	237	67	.283	0	27
OF	Lip Pike	31	145	47	.324	0	11

==== Other batters ====
Note: G = Games played; AB = At bats; H = Hits; Avg. = Batting average; HR = Home runs; RBI = Runs batted in

Player	G	AB	H	Avg.	HR	RBI
Buttercup Dickerson	29	123	38	.309	0	9

=== Pitching ===
==== Starting pitchers ====
Note: G = Games pitched; IP = Innings pitched; W = Wins; L = Losses; ERA = Earned run average; SO = Strikeouts

Player	G	IP	W	L	ERA	SO
Will White	52	468.0	30	21	1.79	169
Bobby Mitchell	9	80.0	7	2	2.14	51
