= 1878 Boston Red Caps season =

1878 Boston Red Caps
- National League champions
- League: National League
- Ballpark: South End Grounds
- City: Boston, Massachusetts
- Record: 41–19 (.683)
- League place: 1st
- Owner: Arthur Soden
- Manager: Harry Wright

The 1878 Boston Red Caps season was the eighth season of the franchise. The Red Caps won their second straight National League pennant.

== Regular season ==
=== Season standings ===
National League
| Team | W | L | Pct. | GB | Home | Road |
|---|---|---|---|---|---|---|
| Boston Red Caps | 41 | 19 | .683 | — | 23‍–‍7 | 18‍–‍12 |
| Cincinnati Reds | 37 | 23 | .617 | 4 | 25‍–‍8 | 12‍–‍15 |
| Providence Grays | 33 | 27 | .550 | 8 | 17‍–‍13 | 16‍–‍14 |
| Chicago White Stockings | 30 | 30 | .500 | 11 | 17‍–‍18 | 13‍–‍12 |
| Indianapolis Blues | 24 | 36 | .400 | 17 | 10‍–‍17 | 14‍–‍19 |
| Milwaukee Grays | 15 | 45 | .250 | 26 | 7‍–‍18 | 8‍–‍27 |

=== Record vs. opponents ===
1878 National League record Sources:
| Team | BSN | CHI | CIN | IND | MIL | PRO |
|---|---|---|---|---|---|---|
| Boston | — | 8–4 | 6–6 | 10–2 | 11–1 | 6–6 |
| Chicago | 4–8 | — | 2–10 | 8–4 | 10–2 | 6–6–1 |
| Cincinnati | 6–6 | 10–2 | — | 4–8–1 | 8–4 | 9–3 |
| Indianapolis | 2–10 | 4–8 | 8–4–1 | — | 8–4–1 | 2–10–1 |
| Milwaukee | 1–11 | 2–10 | 4–8 | 4–8–1 | — | 4–8 |
| Providence | 6–6 | 6–6–1 | 3–9 | 10–2–1 | 8–4 | — |

=== Roster ===
1878 Boston Red Caps
Roster
| Pitchers: Tommy Bond; Catchers: Pop Snyder | Infielders: Jack Burdock; John Morrill; Ezra Sutton; George Wright | Outfielders: Andy Leonard; Jack Manning; Jim O'Rourke; Harry Schafer | Manager: Harry Wright |

== Player stats ==
=== Batting ===
==== Starters by position ====
Note: Pos = Position; G = Games played; AB = At bats; H = Hits; Avg. = Batting average; HR = Home runs; RBI = Runs batted in

| Pos | Player | G | AB | H | Avg. | HR | RBI |
|---|---|---|---|---|---|---|---|
| C | Pop Snyder | 60 | 226 | 48 | .212 | 0 | 14 |
| 1B | John Morrill | 60 | 233 | 56 | .240 | 0 | 23 |
| 2B | Jack Burdock | 60 | 246 | 64 | .260 | 0 | 25 |
| 3B | Ezra Sutton | 60 | 239 | 54 | .226 | 1 | 29 |
| SS | George Wright | 59 | 267 | 60 | .225 | 0 | 12 |
| OF | Andy Leonard | 60 | 262 | 68 | .260 | 0 | 16 |
| OF | Jack Manning | 60 | 248 | 63 | .254 | 0 | 23 |
| OF | Jim O'Rourke | 60 | 255 | 71 | .278 | 1 | 29 |

==== Other batters ====
Note: G = Games played; AB = At bats; H = Hits; Avg. = Batting average; HR = Home runs; RBI = Runs batted in

| Player | G | AB | H | Avg. | HR | RBI |
|---|---|---|---|---|---|---|
| Harry Schafer | 2 | 8 | 1 | .125 | 0 | 0 |

=== Pitching ===
==== Starting pitchers ====
Note: G = Games pitched; IP = Innings pitched; W = Wins; L = Losses; ERA = Earned run average; SO = Strikeouts

| Player | G | IP | W | L | ERA | SO |
|---|---|---|---|---|---|---|
| Tommy Bond | 59 | 532.2 | 40 | 19 | 2.06 | 182 |

==== Other pitchers ====
Note: G = Games pitched; IP = Innings pitched; W = Wins; L = Losses; ERA = Earned run average; SO = Strikeouts

| Player | G | IP | W | L | ERA | SO |
|---|---|---|---|---|---|---|
| Jack Manning | 3 | 11.1 | 1 | 0 | 14.29 | 2 |
