= Dick Hurley =

American baseball player

- Outfielder
- Born: c. 1847; Honesdale, Pennsylvania, U.S.
- Batted: Left Threw: Unknown

Major league debut
- April 18, 1872, for the Washington Olympics

Last major league appearance
- April 23, 1872, for the Washington Olympics

Major league statistics
- Games played: 2
- At bats: 7
- Hits: 0
- Stats at Baseball Reference

Teams
- National Association of Base Ball Players Buckeye of Cincinnati (1868) Cincinnati Red Stockings (1869) Washington Olympics (1869–1870) National Association of Professional BBP Washington Olympics (1872)

William H. "Dick" Hurley (c. 1847 – after 1875) was an American baseball player who is notable for being the substitute player for the first professional club, the Cincinnati Red Stockings.

Hurley was born in Honesdale, Pennsylvania. After attending Columbia University and playing on its baseball team, he played for the Buckeyes of Cincinnati, one of the leading amateur teams in the Midwest. Along with two of his teammates, Andy Leonard and Charlie Sweasy, he was recruited by Harry Wright as the utility man for the rival Cincinnati Red Stockings in 1869–70, being paid $600 per season for his efforts. He briefly returned to professional baseball in the fledgling National Association as an outfielder for the Washington Olympics in 1872.
