= Cincinnati Buckeyes =

Cincinnati Buckeyes may refer to:

- Cincinnati Buckeyes (19th century team), an amateur team formed a year before the Cincinnati Reds
- the Cleveland Buckeyes, a Negro league team who played in Cincinnati as the Cincinnati Buckeyes in 1942 before moving to Cleveland
