= VCFL =

VCFL may refer to the following terms:

- Victorian Country Football League, a governing body for Australian rules football
- Virginia-Carolina Football League, a professional American football league
