= Mike Campbell (first baseman) =

American baseball player (1850–1926)

- First baseman
- Born: c. 1850; Ireland
- Died: January 12, 1926; Elizabeth, New Jersey
- Batted: Right Threw: Right

Major-league debut
- April 28, 1873, for the Elizabeth Resolutes

Last major-league appearance
- July 23, 1873, for the Elizabeth Resolutes

Major-league statistics
- Batting average: .145
- Home runs: 0
- Runs batted in: 3
- Stats at Baseball Reference

Teams
- National Association of Base Ball Players Irvington of Irvington, NJ (1866–1869) Elizabeth Resolutes (1870) National Association of Professional BBP Elizabeth Resolutes (1873)

Michael Campbell (c. 1850 – January 12, 1926) was an American professional baseball player at the beginning of the professional era, primarily with teams in northern New Jersey.

== Amateur career ==
=== 1866 ===
Campbell and his older brother Hugh Campbell joined the Irvington club of Irvington, New Jersey, for the 1866 season. The Irvingtons were a new member of the National Association of Base Ball Players, and a "country club" in that Irvington was still outside the growing metropolis. (Irvington is in Essex County, closer to Newark and the Hudson River than to the western boundary.) In one sense most of the Association was new; membership boomed to 98 clubs for 1866, up from merely 30 including 22 in Greater New York. Hugh Campbell and at least two Irvington teammates had played for the Newark club in 1865.

In their first match of the season on June 14, Irvington shocked the champion Brooklyn Atlantics 23 to 17, who were undefeated for two seasons. Irvington would take the championship from Atlantic if it could schedule a rematch or two and win at least one of them before any other club beat the champions in two of three.

Location helped Irvington get two rematches but they did not get the one win. Atlantic won 28–11 in September and 12–6 in ten innings on October 29.

Sixteen-year-old Mike Campbell played 13 of 17 team games on record and he was the regular at first base. He made more than an equal share of outs and scored less than an equal share of runs. Hugh Campbell played 17 games on record, primarily at center field. The best players were pitcher Rynie Wolters and catcher Andy Leonard.

=== 1867 ===
All nine regular players returned to the Irvingtons for 1867 and they were joined by Lip Pike for part of the season. Pike had moved from New York to play for the 1866 Athletics, presumably for some compensation; his subsequent move to the Irvingtons suggests compensation too. They were again one of the stronger teams in the association, winning 16 of 23 matches on record; in June and July they won two close ones from Union of Morrisania, who would take the crown in October.

Pitcher Wolters was against the team's outstanding batter, measured by runs scored and hands lost. Otherwise the attack was balanced and Mike Campbell at seventeen was one among equals. He played 21 matches, tie for the lead.

=== 1868 ===
The New York Mutuals acquired Lip Pike during the 1867 season and two more of the Irvingtons for 1868, shortstop Mahlon Stockman and the great Wolters. At the same time Andy Leonard and Charlie Sweasy moved to the Buckeyes, an ambitious club in Cincinnati. Although five regular players remained, the team was much weakened and no longer adequately covered in the known records. Mike Campbell may have been the best remaining batter-runner. In 10 matches he scored 24 runs with 22 hands lost (times put out), the highest ratio on the team.

== Professional career ==
In 1873 Mike Campbell was the starting first baseman for the Elizabeth Resolutes of the National Association.

Campbell was an average fielder and a poor hitter for the 2-21 Resolutes. In 21 games he batted 12-for 84 (.143) with two runs batted in and nine runs scored.

His older brother, Hugh Campbell, was the team's main starting pitcher.

== See also ==
- List of players from Ireland in Major League Baseball
