= Charlie Gould =

American baseball player (1847–1917)

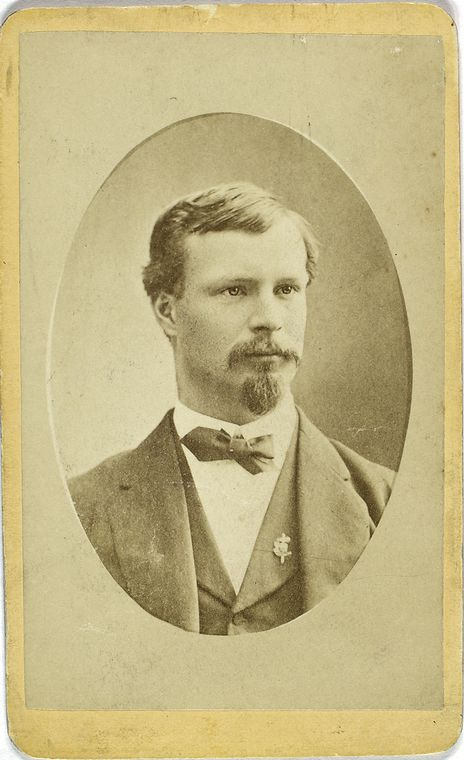
- First baseman
- Born: August 21, 1847; Cincinnati, Ohio, U.S.
- Died: April 9, 1917 (aged 69); Flushing, New York, U.S.
- Batted: Right Threw: Right

Major-league debut
- May 5, 1871, for the Boston Red Stockings

Last major-league appearance
- July 12, 1877, for the Cincinnati Reds

Major-league statistics
- Batting average: .257
- Hits: 248
- RBIs: 110
- Stats at Baseball Reference

Teams
- National Association of Base Ball Players Buckeye of Cincinnati (1867) Cincinnati Red Stockings (1868–1870) League Player Boston Red Stockings (1871–1872) Baltimore Canaries (1874) New Haven Elm Citys (1875) Cincinnati Reds (1876–1877) League Manager New Haven Elm Citys (1875) Cincinnati Reds (1876)

Charles Harvey Gould (August 21, 1847 – April 9, 1917), nicknamed "Bushel Basket", was an American professional baseball player during the 1860s and 1870s. He was the first baseman for the Cincinnati Red Stockings of 1869 and 1870, the first team consisting entirely of professional players. He was the only native Cincinnatian on the club.

Gould was noted as having an affable personality, and for being the tallest player on the Red Stockings at six feet tall. His height and long arms were physical traits that factored in his high fielding proficiency. He was rarely noted for making errors, or "muffing" the ball during his career, but it was his throwing error in the eleventh inning of a game between the Red Stockings and the Brooklyn Atlantics in 1870, that allowed the winning run to score, ending the Stockings' 84 game winning streak.

He returned home in 1876 to lead the new club that was a charter member of the National League. In all he played about twelve seasons of "bare hand" first base for major teams.

== Pre-professional baseball ==
Born 1847 in Cincinnati, Ohio, Gould began his organized baseball career for the local Buckeye club in 1863 as their regular first baseman, and was still in that role when the club joined the National Association of Base Ball Players (NABBP) in 1866. During the off-season, he worked as a bookkeeper for his father's butter and eggs business. His lanky frame and long arms were physical traits that assisted him in becoming a well-regarded fielder, and he was known to rarely make errors.

He stayed with the Buckeyes through the 1866 season, then he joined the cross-town rivals, the Cincinnati Red Stockings, for the 1867 season. The Red Stockings, bolstered by players imported from the east coast, defeated the Buckeyes and other regional rivals that summer and fared well against all but the strongest teams on a tour from Washington to Albany to Cleveland in the fall. In September 1867, at the locally held Great Baseball Tournament, he won the prizes for "farthest throw" 302 ft 3 in (92.13 m) and "best second base". Gould played every game in 1868 and missed one game in 1869. His fielding ability at first base earned him the nickname "Bushel Basket"

== Cincinnati (1869–1870) ==
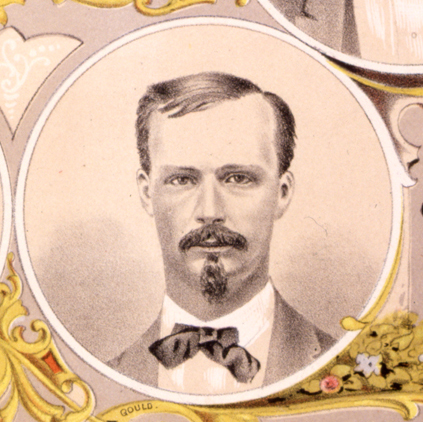

When the NABBP permitted professionalism for 1869, Red Stockings manager, Harry Wright, kept Gould and three other players from his 1868 team, then filled the rest with eastern players to complete the team. Gould was the only Cincinnatian, and the only 6-foot-tall (1.8 m) player on the team. Cal McVey was the only other player even from the Midwest. Gould's salary for that season was $800, and offensively, batted third in the line-up.

The Red Stockings toured the continent undefeated in 1869 and may have been the strongest team in 1870, but the club dropped professional baseball after the second season.

== National Association (1871–1875) ==
Harry Wright was hired to organize a new team in Boston, where he signed Gould and two other Red Stockings for 1871. Wright brought along the nickname, too. Charlie Gould remained two seasons at first base for the new Boston Red Stockings, so he was part of the club's and Boston's first championship team. In 1872, he led the National Association in triples with eight. He was replaced for 1873 by Jim O'Rourke who would be one of the biggest stars in the game for the next twenty years.

On September 5, 1871, Gould hit the first grand slam in professional baseball history.

== National League ==
Next year the new National League excluded New Haven but one charter member was a new club in Cincinnati, the Reds, which hired Gould to lead it. The new Cincinnatis were a woefully weak tailender but the club did survive and Gould played another season at first, relieved of his leadership role.

== Post-career ==
His playing career had ended after the 1877 season, but not his association with the club. He later became a police officer in Cincinnati. Gould died at the age of 69 in Flushing, New York, and is interred in Spring Grove Cemetery in Cincinnati. His gravesite was unmarked until 1951, when Cincinnati Reds President Warren Giles launched a successful campaign to place a marker, a monument that currently stands.

== See also ==
- List of Major League Baseball player–managers

== Referenced materials ==
- Ellard, Harry ([1908] 2004). Base Ball in Cincinnati: A History. Jefferson, NC: McFarland & Co. ISBN 0-7864-1726-9
- Guschov, Stephen D. (1998). The Red Stockings of Cincinnati. McFarland. ISBN 0-7864-0467-1
- Wright, Marshall (2000). The National Association of Base Ball Players, 1857-1870. Jefferson, NC: McFarland & Co. ISBN 0-7864-0779-4

Sporting positions
Preceded by First manager	Cincinnati Reds (1876–1880) Managers; 1876	Succeeded by Lip Pike
