= 1878 Providence Grays season =

1878 Providence Grays
- League: National League
- Ballpark: Messer Street Grounds
- City: Providence, Rhode Island
- Record: 33–27 (.550)
- League place: 3rd
- Owner: Henry Root
- Manager: Tom York

The Providence Grays were a new franchise that joined the National League for the 1878 baseball season. They finished in third place.

== Regular season ==
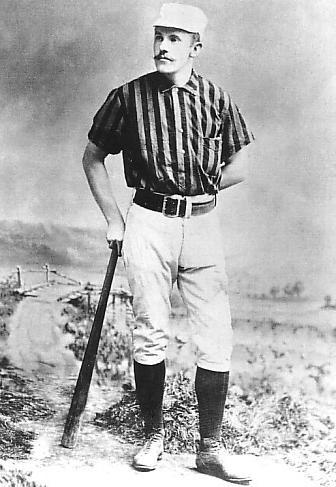
Pitcher John Montgomery Ward

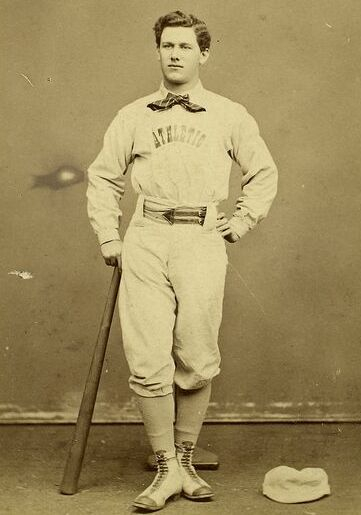
First baseman Tim Murnane

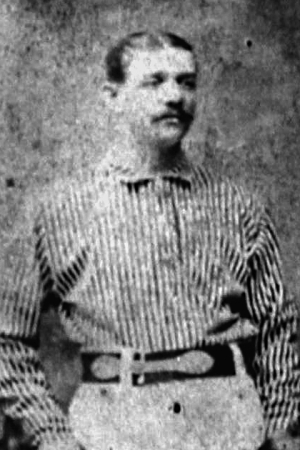
Manager / left fielder Tom York

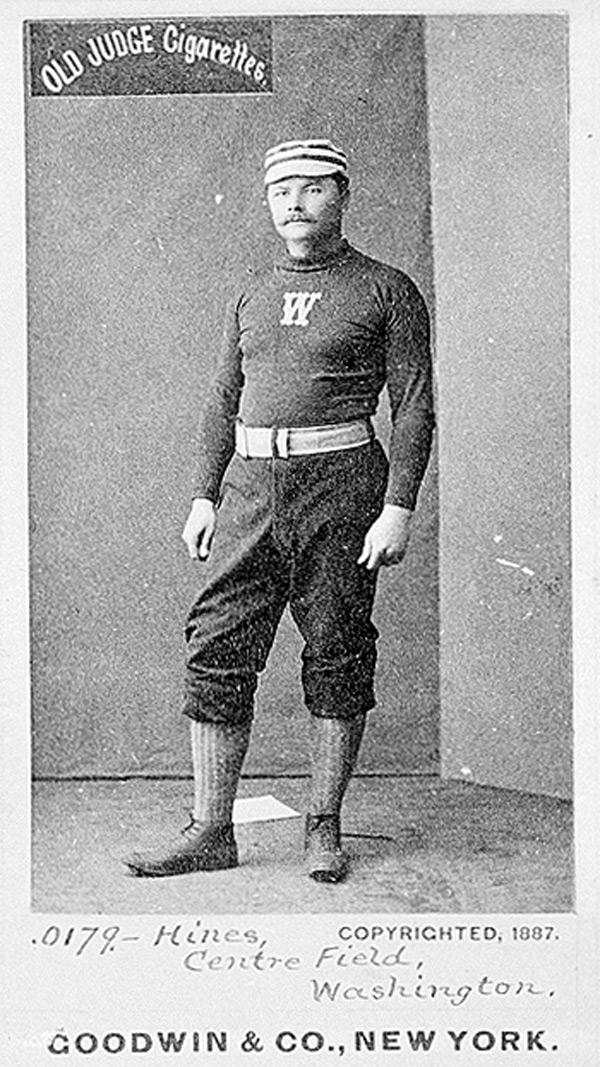
Center fielder Paul Hines

=== Season standings ===
National League
Team	W	L	Pct.	GB	Home	Road
Boston Red Caps	41	19	.683	—	23‍–‍7	18‍–‍12
Cincinnati Reds	37	23	.617	4	25‍–‍8	12‍–‍15
Providence Grays	33	27	.550	8	17‍–‍13	16‍–‍14
Chicago White Stockings	30	30	.500	11	17‍–‍18	13‍–‍12
Indianapolis Blues	24	36	.400	17	10‍–‍17	14‍–‍19
Milwaukee Grays	15	45	.250	26	7‍–‍18	8‍–‍27

=== Record vs. opponents ===
1878 National League record Sources:
Team	BSN	CHI	CIN	IND	MIL	PRO
Boston	—	8–4	6–6	10–2	11–1	6–6
Chicago	4–8	—	2–10	8–4	10–2	6–6–1
Cincinnati	6–6	10–2	—	4–8–1	8–4	9–3
Indianapolis	2–10	4–8	8–4–1	—	8–4–1	2–10–1
Milwaukee	1–11	2–10	4–8	4–8–1	—	4–8
Providence	6–6	6–6–1	3–9	10–2–1	8–4	—

=== Roster ===
1878 Providence Grays
Roster
Pitchers: Fred Corey; Cherokee Fisher; Tom Healey; Tricky Nichols; John Ward; Harry Wheeler	Catchers: Doug Allison; Lew Brown; Infielders: Tom Carey; Bill Hague; Tim Murnane; Lip Pike; Charlie Sweasy	Outfielders: Dick Higham; Paul Hines; Tom York	Manager: Tom York

== Player stats ==
=== Batting ===
==== Starters by position ====
Note: Pos = Position; G = Games played; AB = At bats; H = Hits; Avg. = Batting average; HR = Home runs; RBI = Runs batted in

Pos	Player	G	AB	H	Avg.	HR	RBI
C	Lew Brown	58	243	74	.305	1	43
1B	Tim Murnane	49	188	45	.239	0	14
2B	Charlie Sweasy	55	212	37	.175	0	8
3B	Bill Hague	62	250	51	.204	0	25
SS	Tom Carey	61	253	60	.237	0	24
OF	Dick Higham	62	281	90	.320	1	29
OF	Tom York	62	269	83	.309	1	26
OF	Paul Hines	62	257	92	.358	4	50

==== Other batters ====
Note: G = Games played; AB = At bats; H = Hits; Avg. = Batting average; HR = Home runs; RBI = Runs batted in

Player	G	AB	H	Avg.	HR	RBI
Doug Allison	19	76	22	.289	0	7
Lip Pike	5	22	5	.227	0	4

=== Pitching ===
==== Starting pitchers ====
Note: G = Games pitched; IP = Innings pitched; W = Wins; L = Losses; ERA = Earned run average; SO = Strikeouts

Player	G	IP	W	L	ERA	SO
John Ward	37	334.0	22	13	1.51	116
Tricky Nichols	11	98.0	4	7	4.22	21
Harry Wheeler	7	62.0	6	1	3.48	25
Fred Corey	5	23.0	1	2	2.35	7
Tom Healey	3	24.0	0	3	3.00	2
Cherokee Fisher	1	9.0	0	1	4.00	2

==== Relief pitchers ====
Note: G = Games pitched; W = Wins; L = Losses; SV = Saves; ERA = Earned run average; SO = Strikeouts

Player	G	W	L	SV	ERA	SO
Doug Allison	1	0	0	0	1.80	0
Lew Brown	1	0	0	0	18.00	0
