= Lincoln Park Grounds =

Baseball park in Cincinnati, Ohio

Coordinates: 39°06′32.23″N 84°31′56.97″W

- Union Grounds; The Grand Duchess
- Interactive map of Lincoln Park Grounds
- Location: Hopkins & McLean Ave. Cincinnati, Ohio
- Capacity: 4,000
- Surface: Grass

Construction
- Opened: 1856; 170 years ago (as cricket ground)

Tenant
- Cincinnati Red Stockings

The Lincoln Park Grounds, commonly known as Union Grounds, was a former baseball park, part of Lincoln Park, located in Cincinnati, Ohio. The Grounds were built for the Union Cricket Club in 1856; they "were used for cricket and baseball in the summer and were flooded for skating in the winter." In 1865 Harry Wright became the professional of the Cincinnati Cricket Club, which also used the grounds, and the next year Aaron Champion, president of the new Cincinnati Base Ball Club, "approached Wright to propose a limited use of the grounds if the CBBC and Live Oaks club would put in $2000 each to revamp the Lincoln Park Grounds."

A year later the [Red Stockings] leased the grounds of the Union Cricket Club for its home tilts. Most club members referred to the field as the Union Grounds, although it also was known as the Union Cricket Club Grounds and the Lincoln Park Grounds, given the fact that the eight-acre, fenced grounds were located in a small park behind Lincoln Park in Cincinnati, near the Union Terminal. It was a twenty-minute ride by streetcar to the Union Grounds from the heart of downtown Cincinnati. Aaron Champion ordered that approximately $10,000 worth of improvements be made to the home grounds for the 1867 season, including grading and sodding of the field and building of a new clubhouse and stands.

Lincoln Park was bounded by Kenner Street (north); Freeman Avenue (east); Hopkins Street (south); and Hoefer Street (later Dalton Street) (west). Old maps show the western one-third of the park designated as "ball field". A road called Lincoln Place (which no longer exists) separated the main park from the ball field.

The ballpark hosted three National Association games in the spring and summer of 1871. One of them was held on July 4, featuring the Boston Red Stockings as the "visitors" and the Washington Olympics as the "home" team. Those were the two clubs that most of the 1869–70 Cincinnati Red Stockings players had joined when the Cincinnati club disbanded after the 1870 season. The previous day, those former members of the Red Stockings had played an exhibition game against the other members of the Boston and Olympic clubs, advertised as the "Old Reds" against a "picked nine". The "picked nine" won the game 15–13.

The Union Grounds were used until 1875; the next year a new Cincinnati Red Stockings club played at the Avenue Grounds two miles to the north.

Lincoln Park itself was eventually closed and its property became the site of the Cincinnati Union Terminal. The greenway through the middle of the terminal parking lot serves as a last vestige of Lincoln Park. A plaque on the site, honoring the Red Stockings, states that the diamond and the main stands faced the northwest. That would be at the corner of Hopkins Street and Lincoln Place, with Hoefer/Dalton the left field boundary and Kenner the right field boundary.

Preceded by Live Oaks Base Ball Grounds	Home of the Cincinnati Red Stockings; 1867–1870	Succeeded by None
