= Dutch Schesler =

German baseball player (1900-1953)

- Pitcher
- Born: June 1, 1900; Frankfurt, German Empire
- Died: November 19, 1953 (aged 53); Harrisburg, Pennsylvania, US
- Batted: Right Threw: Right

MLB debut
- April 16, 1931, for the Philadelphia Phillies

Last MLB appearance
- August 12, 1931, for the Philadelphia Phillies

MLB statistics
- Win–loss record: 0–0
- Earned run average: 7.28
- Strikeouts: 14
- Stats at Baseball Reference

Teams
- Philadelphia Phillies (1931)

Charles "Dutch" Schesler [also spelled Schussler] (June 1, 1900 – November 19, 1953) was a German pitcher in Major League Baseball.

Schesler debuted in 1931 and appeared in relief in 17 games for the Philadelphia Phillies. He posted a 7.28 earned run average with 14 strikeouts and 18 walks in 38 1/3 innings pitched without any wins or losses.

== See also ==
- List of Major League Baseball players from Europe
