= Frank Thompson (catcher) =

Portuguese baseball player (1852–1925)

- Catcher / Right fielder
- Born: Augustus Fernandez; February 1852; Madeira, Portugal
- Died: October 30, 1925 (aged 73); Brooklyn, New York, U.S.
- Batted: Unknown Threw: Unknown

Major league debut
- April 26, 1875, for the Washington Nationals

Last major league appearance
- September 11, 1875, for the Brooklyn Atlantics

Major league statistics
- At bats: 46
- Batting average: .130
- Runs batted in: 4
- Stats at Baseball Reference

Teams
- Washington Nationals (1875); Brooklyn Atlantics (1875)

Frank Thompson (born Augustus Fernandez; February 1852 – October 30, 1925) was a Portuguese professional baseball catcher and right fielder in the United States. He played during 1875 for two major league teams of the National Association: the Washington Nationals and the Brooklyn Atlantics.

Until Isaiah Campbell debuted for the 2023 Seattle Mariners, Thompson was the only major league player born in Portugal.

== Career ==
Thompson played in 11 games with the 1875 Washington Nationals as a catcher (also playing part of one game in the outfield), during which he had a batting average of .098 and committed 32 errors and 25 passed balls.

In his lone game with the 1875 Brooklyn Atlantics, Thompson recorded two hits, a run scored, and a run batted in, but made two errors in two chances while playing right field.

In 1877, Thompson played for Erie of the League Alliance.

== Personal life ==
Thompson was born as Augustus Fernandez in Madeira, Portugal. He was the first major league player known to have been born in Portugal, and remained the only one born there until pitcher Isaiah Campbell made his debut for the Seattle Mariners in 2023.

Thompson died in Brooklyn in October 1925 and was interred at Holy Cross Cemetery, Brooklyn.

== Research ==
In 2018, researchers determined that Frank Thompson, of the Atlantics, and a player previously identified as either Andrew Thompson or only by the surname "Thompson", of the Nationals, were actually the same player, who had been born in Madeira as "Augustus Fernandez."

While David Nemec identifies this player as the Andrew Thompson who managed the St. Paul Saints of the Union Association in 1884, Paul Batesel states that they were two different people.
