= Frank Hankinson =

American baseball player (1856–1911)

- Third baseman
- Born: April 29, 1856; New York City
- Died: April 5, 1911 (aged 54); Palisades Park, New Jersey
- Batted: Right Threw: Right

MLB debut
- May 1, 1878, for the Chicago White Stockings

Last MLB appearance
- October 14, 1888, for the Kansas City Cowboys

MLB statistics
- Batting average: .228
- Home runs: 13
- Runs batted in: 344
- Stats at Baseball Reference

Teams
- Chicago White Stockings (1878–79); Cleveland Blues (1880); Troy Trojans (1881); New York Gothams (1883–84); New York Metropolitans (1885–87); Kansas City Cowboys (1888)

Frank Edward Hankinson (April 29, 1856 – April 5, 1911) was an American third baseman in the early years of Major League Baseball. He played for the Chicago White Stockings (1878–1879), Cleveland Blues (1880), Troy Trojans (1881), New York Gothams (1883–1884), New York Metropolitans (1885–1887), and Kansas City Cowboys (1888). The Metropolitans and the Cowboys were members of the American Association, while his previous teams were all members of the still-existing National League.

Born in New York City, Hankinson was, for the most part, a third baseman, but over the course of his career he played at every position except catcher; he pitched in 32 games, starting 28 of them. Almost all of his pitching came in 1879 with the White Stockings, when he was 15–10 in 25 starts. He was 16–12 with a solid 2.50 ERA in 266 2/3 innings pitched in his career. Hankinson completed all 28 of his starts, 2 of them shutouts.

In a 10-season career, Hankinson batted .228 with 13 home runs and 344 RBIs. He had 122 doubles and a total of 747 hits in 3272 at bats.

He died in Palisades Park, New Jersey.
