= Isaiah Campbell =

American baseball player (born 1997)

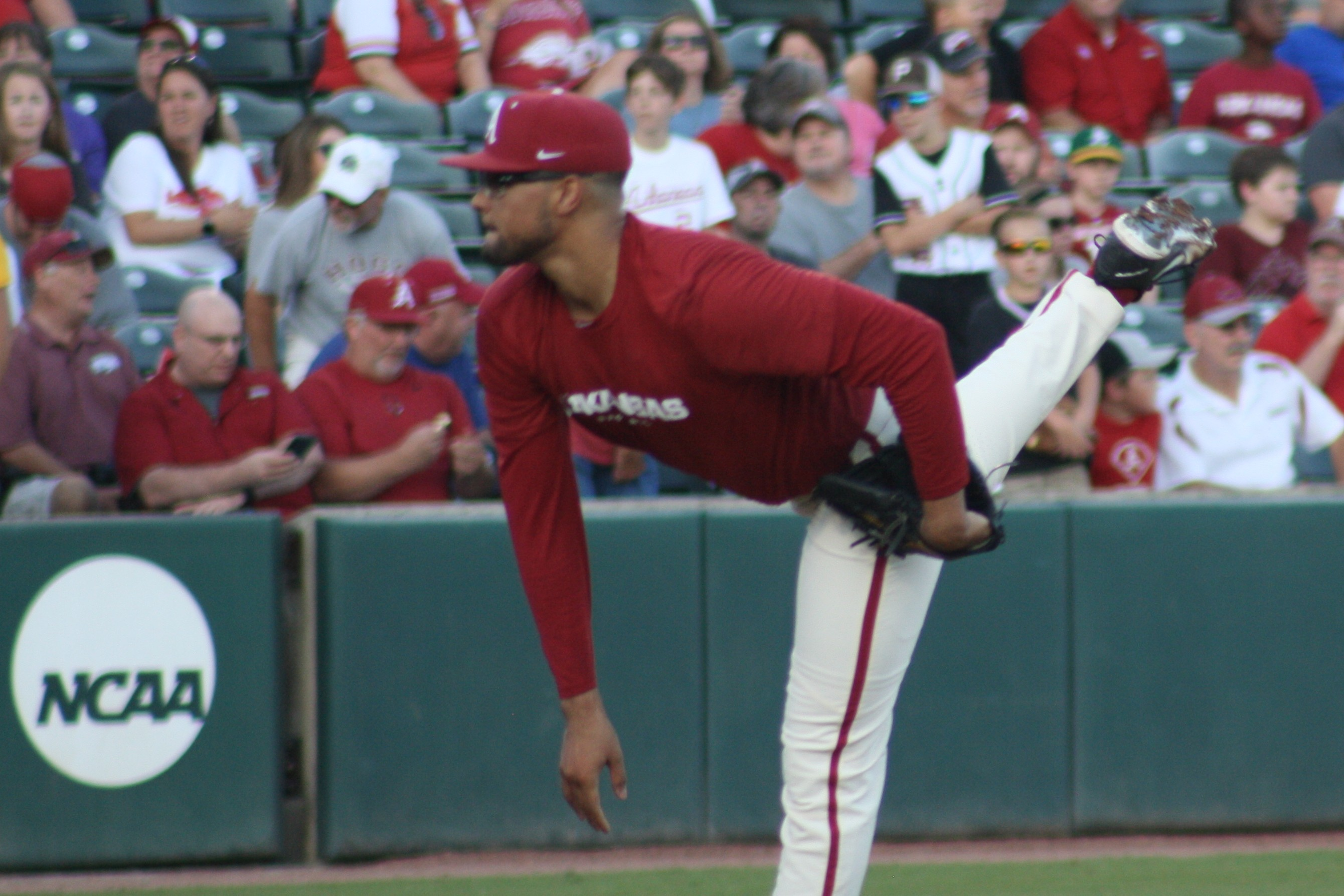
- Campbell with the Arkansas Razorbacks

Free agent
- Pitcher
- Born: August 15, 1997 (age 29); Angra do Heroísmo, Portugal
- Bats: Right Throws: Right

MLB debut
- July 7, 2023, for the Seattle Mariners

MLB statistics (through 2025 season)
- Win–loss record: 4–2
- Earned run average: 5.65
- Strikeouts: 42
- Stats at Baseball Reference

Teams
- Seattle Mariners (2023); Boston Red Sox (2024–2025)

Isaiah Lyn Campbell (born August 15, 1997) is an American professional baseball pitcher who is a free agent. He has previously played in Major League Baseball (MLB) for the Seattle Mariners and Boston Red Sox. Campbell was selected by the Mariners in the second round of the 2019 MLB draft.

== Amateur career ==
Campbell was born in Portugal, where his father was stationed while serving in the United States Air Force, then grew up in Kansas and attended Olathe South High School in Olathe, Kansas. As a senior, he had a 5–1 win–loss record with a 1.66 earned run average (ERA). He struck out 42 batters in 33 2/3 innings pitched.

Campbell made six starts and 13 appearances for the Arkansas Razorbacks as a true freshman. He had 23 strikeouts in 31 2/3 innings pitched while going 3–1 with a 3.69 ERA. He was also named to the Southeastern Conference (SEC) First Year Academic Honor Roll. His sophomore season in 2017 was cut short after just 2/3 of an inning due to an elbow injury, for which he was granted a medical redshirt. He helped the Razorbacks to the 2018 College World Series final, winning the game in the semi-final that allowed them to advance to the final. That season, he appeared in 18 games, making 17 starts, including four in the NCAA tournament and two in the College World Series.

After the 2018 season, Campbell was drafted by the Los Angeles Angels in the 24th round of the 2018 MLB draft, but opted to return to college for his junior season. In 2019, he had his best season yet, making 18 starts, striking out 125 batters in 118 1/3 innings and going 12–1 with a 2.13 ERA. The Razorbacks reached the 2019 College World Series but were eliminated in the first round by Florida State.

== Professional career ==
=== Seattle Mariners ===
Campbell was drafted by the Seattle Mariners in the second round, with the 76th overall selection, of the 2019 Major League Baseball draft. Campbell signed with the Mariners for an $850,000 signing bonus. He did not play professionally that season, and did not play in a game in 2020 due to the cancellation of the minor league season because of the COVID-19 pandemic.

Campbell made his professional debut in 2021 with the Everett AquaSox of High-A West, pitching 19 1/3 innings and going 3–1 with a 2.33 ERA. His season ended prematurely after undergoing elbow surgery. He began the 2022 season as a starting pitcher, but continued to experience elbow discomfort after his first four games, and he was placed on the injured list again. After Campbell's return, the Mariners converted him to a relief pitcher to minimize the stress on his elbow, and Campbell thrived in his new role, giving up only an unearned run on eight hits and a walk while striking out 20 in 15 innings for the AquaSox. This performance earned Campbell a promotion to Double-A with the Arkansas Travelers in August. With Arkansas in 2022, he pitched to a 3.46 ERA and struck out 24 batters while walking only two.

On November 15, 2022, the Mariners added Campbell to their 40-man roster to protect him from the Rule 5 draft. Campbell was optioned to the Double-A Travelers to begin the 2023 season. In 23 games to begin the season, he went 6–0 with a 2.63 ERA, 27 strikeouts, and 2 saves in 24 innings of work. On July 6, 2023, Campbell was promoted to the major leagues for the first time. He made his debut on July 7 by throwing a scoreless inning with one strikeout. This made Campbell only the second Portuguese-born player to appear in the major leagues, and the first since Frank Thompson, who played twelve games in 1875. After making three appearances and recording six strikeouts, Campbell was sent back down to Double-A on July 19. He was called back up three days later and garnered his first major league victory against the Toronto Blue Jays. Overall, Campbell appeared in 27 major-league games with the Mariners, all in relief, compiling a 4–1 record with a 2.83 ERA and one save.

=== Boston Red Sox ===
On November 17, 2023, Campbell was traded to the Boston Red Sox for infielder Luis Urías. He made 8 appearances for Boston in 2024, struggling to a 16.20 ERA with 6 strikeouts over 6 2/3 innings pitched. While on optional assignment with the Triple–A Worcester Red Sox, Campbell was placed on the injured list with right elbow inflammation on July 23, 2024. He was transferred to the 60–day injured list on September 7, ending his season. Campbell was designated for assignment by Boston on November 19. On November 22, the Red Sox non–tendered Campbell, making him a free agent. He re–signed with the organization on a minor-league contract the same day.

Campbell began the 2025 season with Triple-A Worcester, registering a 5–4 record and 3.89 ERA with 33 strikeouts and seven saves over 30 relief outings. On July 8, the Red Sox selected Campbell's contract, adding him to their active roster. In six appearance for Boston, he struggled to a 7.04 ERA with three strikeouts across 7 2/3 innings pitched. On October 17, Campbell was removed from the 40-man roster and sent outright to Worcester. He elected free agency on November 6.

=== Arizona Diamondbacks ===
On December 5, 2025, Campbell signed a minor league contract with the Arizona Diamondbacks organization. He began the 2026 season with the Triple-A Reno Aces In 52 games of relief with Triple-A Reno Aces he threw 54 innings going 5-2 with a 6.83 ERA with 63 strikeouts and 4 saves. He elected free agency on November 2.
