= Cincinnati Buckeyes (19th-century team) =

Amateur baseball team in Cincinnati, Ohio

The Cincinnati Buckeyes was the name of two amateur baseball teams in Cincinnati, Ohio. The first, formed in 1859, disbanded during the Civil War.

Another team, the Buckeyes Base Ball Club of Cincinnati, formed in 1865. In the late 1860s, the Buckeyes were a skilled baseball team and were starting to make themselves known nationally. In 1868, they had won 21 games and lost only 5. However, when another local team, the Cincinnati Red Stockings, decided to field an all-professional team in 1869, it spelled the end for the amateur Buckeyes. In fact, Buckeye stars Charlie Gould, Charlie Sweasy, Andy Leonard and Dick Hurley left the team to join the Red Stockings. The Buckeyes considered going professional themselves, but did not have the resources to do so. After some humiliating defeats against the rival Red Stockings in 1869, the club folded in 1870.

Star pitcher Cherokee Fisher played for the Buckeyes in 1868.

In 1869, the Buckeyes played on "Iron Slag" grounds, near today's Union Terminal.

== Modern team ==
In 2001, the Cincinnati Vintage Base Ball Club formed a vintage base ball team called the Cincinnati Buckeyes, named and styled after the former Buckeyes Base Ball Club of Cincinnati. The team plays baseball as it was played in 1869, using the rules, customs and equipment of the time. The Cincinnati Buckeyes serve as a modern-day rival to the club's other team, the Cincinnati Red Stockings. However, they also travel around the Midwest to play other vintage base ball teams. They play their home games at Heritage Village in Sharon Woods Park, Sharonville, Ohio (north of Cincinnati). The team is a member of the Vintage Base Ball Association.
