= P. J. Conlon =

Baseball player (born 1993)

- Pitcher
- Born: November 11, 1993 (age 32); Belfast, Northern Ireland
- Batted: Left Threw: Left

MLB debut
- May 7, 2018, for the New York Mets

Last MLB appearance
- July 10, 2018, for the New York Mets

MLB statistics
- Win–loss record: 0–0
- Earned run average: 8.22
- Strikeouts: 5
- Stats at Baseball Reference

Teams
- New York Mets (2018)

Patrick Joshua Conlon (born November 11, 1993) is a former professional baseball pitcher who played for the New York Mets in 2018. He was the first Irish-born Major League Baseball player since Joe Cleary pitched for the Washington Senators in 1945.

== Early life ==
Conlon was born in Belfast, Northern Ireland to an Irish father, Patrick, a physical education teacher, and a Scottish mother, Susan, a recreational therapist. His parents met while living in California, where Patrick was attending Cal State Fullerton and Susan was attending Fresno State. The couple moved to Belfast before Conlon was born. Shortly before Conlon's second birthday, Conlon and his family moved back to California. He became an American citizen at 16 years old. He attended El Dorado High School in Placentia, California.

== Career ==
Conlon attended the University of San Diego, where he played college baseball for the San Diego Toreros. In 2014, he played collegiate summer baseball with the Chatham Anglers of the Cape Cod Baseball League. The New York Mets selected Conlon in the 13th round of the 2015 MLB draft.

=== New York Mets ===
Conlon began his professional career in 2015 with the Brooklyn Cyclones of the New York–Penn League where he pitched 17 innings in 17 games without giving up an earned run. He began 2016 with the Columbia Fireflies of the Sally League before moving up to the St. Lucie Mets of the Florida State League. He finished the season with a 1.65 ERA, 0.979 WHIP and 112 strikeouts over 142 innings pitched at the two different levels. Following the season, he was named the Mets Organizational Pitcher of the Year, MLB Pipeline Mets Organizational Player of the Year and, in a fan vote, won the MiLBY Award for Top Starting Pitcher. He spent 2017 with the Binghamton Rumble Ponies where he posted an 8–9 record with a 3.38 ERA in 28 games (22 starts). Conlon began 2018 with the Las Vegas 51s of the Pacific Coast League. He had his contract purchased by the Mets on May 6, 2018.

Conlon made his debut for the Mets against the Cincinnati Reds on May 7, 2018, with an Irish tricolour stitched into his glove. He started off well, retiring seven of the first eight Cincinnati batters, but gave up a solo home run to Billy Hamilton in the third inning and two more runs in the fourth before being taken out of the game. In total, Conlon pitched 3.2 innings, allowed three runs on four hits and two walks, and struck out one. He also recorded his first major league hit on a single up the middle, but jammed his thumb while swinging the bat, which is one reason he was pulled early.

Conlon's next chance to pitch in the major leagues came on May 28 in the second game of a doubleheader against the Atlanta Braves. He started the game and pitched into the third inning, but was pulled after allowing four straight hits without recording an out. In total, Conlon allowed four runs on eight hits in two-plus innings pitched.

On June 2, 2018, Conlon was claimed off waivers by the Los Angeles Dodgers, but four days later he returned to the Mets organization when they reclaimed him off waivers from the Dodgers.

Conlon's third and last major league appearance came on July 10, 2018, when he pitched the last two innings of a 7-3 Mets loss to the Philadelphia Phillies. He allowed three hits, no runs, and struck out three.

In 2019, Conlon made appearances for four different minor league teams at four different levels. On July 26, 2019, the Mets organization released Conlon at his own request. Conlon later announced his retirement on his Twitter page.

== International ==
As an American citizen, born in Northern Ireland, to Irish and Scottish parents, Conlon qualifies to represent the United States, the United Kingdom and Ireland internationally. Conlon was previously called up to represent the United Kingdom (which competes internationally in baseball as Great Britain) in the 2017 World Baseball Classic qualifiers, but had reached his pitching limit, so was unable to join the British roster. Conlon also noted that his grandparents often reminded him that he is part Scottish and of the complex nature of his heritage in making the decision to represent Great Britain. Conlon has a close relationship with Great Britain Coach, Liam Carroll.
