= Brooklyn Bay Parkways =

Semi-professional baseball team

Information
- League: Inter-City Baseball Association
- Ballpark: Erasmus Field
- Ownership: Joe Rosner, Nat Strong

The Brooklyn Bay Parkways was a semi-professional baseball team based out of Erasmus Field of Erasmus Hall High School. Owned by Joe Rosner, brother of Max Rosner, owner of the Brooklyn Bushwicks, as well as Nat Strong, a prominent figure in organizing various Negro League teams, the Bay Parkways belonged to the Inter-City Baseball Association and played in the local negro league as well as various other local teams. Former players for the Bay Parkways include former Major League stars such as Carl Hubbell, Babe Ruth, Hal Schumacher, Pete Gray, and Blondy Ryan.
