= Hugh Campbell (baseball) =

American baseball player (1846–1881)

- Pitcher
- Born: c. 1846; Ireland
- Died: March 1, 1881 (aged 34–35); Newark, New Jersey
- Batted: Unknown Threw: Unknown

Major-league debut
- April 28, 1873, for the Elizabeth Resolutes

Last major-league appearance
- July 17, 1873, for the Elizabeth Resolutes

Major-league statistics
- Win–loss record: 2–16
- Earned run average: 2.95
- Strikeouts: 7
- Stats at Baseball Reference

Teams
- National Association of Base Ball Players Irvington of Irvington, NJ (1866–1869) Elizabeth Resolutes (1870) National Association of Professional BBP Elizabeth Resolutes (1873)

Hugh F. Campbell (c. 1846 – March 1, 1881) was an American amateur and professional baseball player who pitched in just one major-league season. He was a starting pitcher for the 1873 Elizabeth Resolutes of the National Association. His younger brother, Mike Campbell, was the team's starting first baseman.

He pitched much better than his 2–16 record would indicate. The Resolutes won 2, lost 21, and made 247 errors, an average of 10.7 per game, with Campbell himself making 21 of them. As a result, he gave up 213 runs in 165 innings pitched, but only 52 of them were earned runs. His ERA was 2.95, which was better than the league average, and was in fact sixth-best in the league. His two victories came against the Brooklyn Atlantics and the Boston Red Stockings.

Campbell died at the age of 34 in Newark, New Jersey of tuberculosis, and is interred at Holy Sepulchre Cemetery in East Orange, New Jersey.

== See also ==
- List of players from Ireland in Major League Baseball
