= Avenue Grounds =

Defunct baseball facility in Ohio

- Brighton Park, Cincinnati Baseball Park
- Interactive map of Avenue Grounds
- Location: Cincinnati, Ohio
- Coordinates: 39°08′35″N 84°32′47″W
- Surface: grass

Tenant
- Cincinnati Reds (NL) (1876-1879)

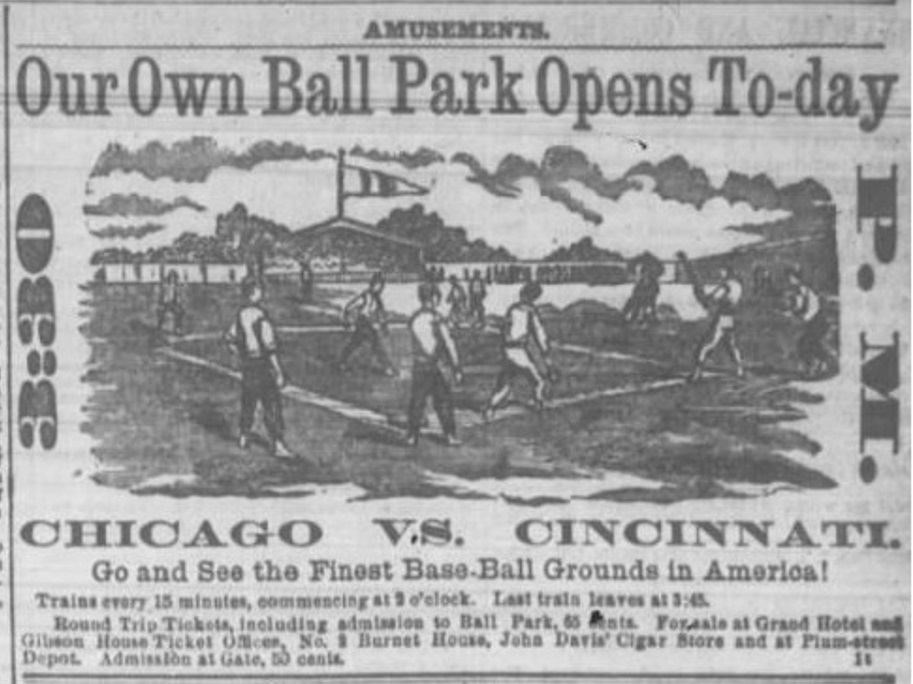
Advertisement for Avenue Grounds

Avenue Grounds was a baseball field located in Cincinnati, USA. Also known as Brighton Park and Cincinnati Baseball Park, the ground was home to the Cincinnati Reds baseball club from April 25, 1876, to August 27, 1879. The ballpark featured a grandstand that could seat up to 3,000 fans. It was approximately 2 miles (3.2 km) north of the Union Grounds, where the original professional team from the area, the Cincinnati Red Stockings, played, and was approximately 4 miles (6.4 km) from the heart of the city, so horse-drawn streetcars and trains were a popular way to travel to the park. The ballpark had first opened in 1875, and would continue to be used for various types of amateur sports until at least the mid-1890s. The major league club of 1876–1879 played poorly, and actually dropped out of the league after the 1879 season. The club revived for 1880, and relocated to the Bank Street Grounds.

== Location ==
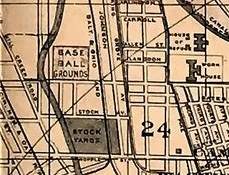
Location per 1888 map

Little is known about this ballpark, as even its location is somewhat sketchy. Contemporary atlases indicate the "Base Ball Grounds" was about two short blocks west of Spring Grove Avenue, bounded on the south by Alabama Avenue, on the west by Mill Creek, on the north by the imaginary line extending from Monmouth Street, and on the immediate east by the Marietta and Cincinnati Railroad tracks. It was a block north of the stockyards, and was straight west of the Cincinnati Work House, which was on the northeast corner of Alabama and Colerain, and which served as the jail.

The Cincinnati Enquirer for July 13, 1875, page 4, reported on the planned new ballpark: "Eight acres (the old Union Grounds contained about four) have been leased north of the Stock Yards and west of the Marietta Railroad, which road will build a station at this point and carry passengers the round trip for 15 cents. $12,000 will be spent in fitting up the grounds with a seating capacity of 7,000, and making them the finest in the country in every way." (Local newspapers in the 19th century often termed any new ballpark as "the finest in the country.")

Available Sanborn insurance maps do not have detail for the location.

After the ballpark's days as a major league venue were over, it continued to be used for amateur baseball and for other events such as soccer and trapshooting. The Enquirer's final mention of the ballpark, by then routinely being called the "old" Avenue Grounds, came on September 4, 1896, p.10, announcing an upcoming amateur ball game.

Although some sources have stated that the ballpark site became the amusement park called Chester Park, that park was located a couple of miles farther northeast on Spring Grove Avenue, T-d into by Mitchell Avenue. Recently the property near the Avenue Grounds site had been occupied by Hilshire Farms and Kahn's, at 3241 Spring Grove. As of 2016, that site was a vacant lot. The approximate actual site of the ballpark is occupied by railroad yards.

== Ballpark amenities ==
Admission onto the grounds cost 50 cents, which was lowered to 10 cents after the fifth inning. The ballpark featured such cuisine as hard-boiled eggs, ham sandwiches, and mineral water. Lemon peel-and-water drinks also sold for 10 cents. There was a special section named the "Little Dukes", for those who wanted to sit near the bar. It also has the claim to Fame for holding the first Ladies' Day in Major League history, in 1876.

== Notes ==
Preceded by -	Home of the Cincinnati Reds (1876–80); 1876 – 1879	Succeeded by Bank Street Grounds
