= Bill Sullivan (outfielder) =

Irish baseball player (1853–1884)

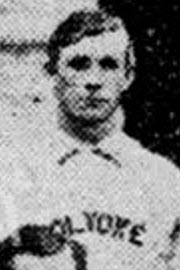
- Outfielder
- Born: July 4, 1853; Ireland
- Died: November 13, 1884 (aged 31); Holyoke, Massachusetts
- Batted: Unknown Threw: Unknown

MLB debut
- August 9, 1878, for the Chicago White Stockings

Last MLB appearance
- August 9, 1878, for the Chicago White Stockings

MLB statistics
- Batting average: .167
- Home runs: 0
- Runs batted in: 0
- Stats at Baseball Reference

Teams
- Chicago White Stockings (1878)

William Sullivan (July 4, 1853 – November 13, 1884) was an Irish born Major League Baseball player. Sullivan played in 1878 for the Chicago White Stockings.

He was born in Ireland and died in Holyoke, Massachusetts.
