= Andy Leonard =

American baseball player (1846–1903)

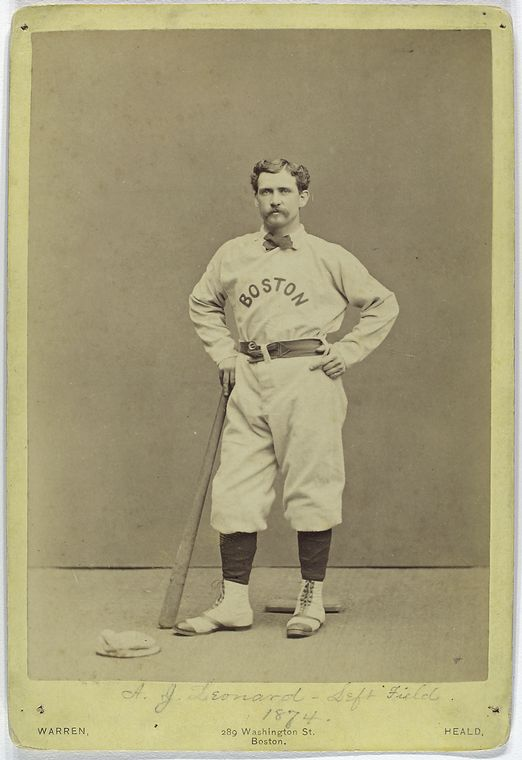
- Outfielder
- Born: June 1, 1846; Kilsallagh, County Cavan, Ireland
- Died: August 21, 1903 (aged 57); Boston, Massachusetts, U.S.
- Batted: Right Threw: Right

Major league debut
- May 5, 1871, for the Washington Olympics

Last major league appearance
- July 6, 1880, for the Cincinnati Stars

Major league statistics
- Batting average: .299
- Hits: 716
- Runs batted in: 346
- Stats at Baseball Reference

Teams
- National Association of Base Ball Players Hudson River of Newburgh, NY (1864–1865) Irvington of Irvington, NJ (1866–1867) Buckeye of Cincinnati (1868) Cincinnati Red Stockings (1869–1870) League player Washington Olympics (1871) Boston Red Stockings/Red Caps (1872–1878) Cincinnati Stars (1880)

Andrew Jackson Leonard (June 1, 1846 – August 21, 1903) was an American amateur and professional baseball player of the 19th century, who played outfield and was also a utility infielder. He played left field for the original Cincinnati Red Stockings, the first fully professional baseball team. He was one of five men to play regularly for both the Cincinnati and the Boston Red Stockings, the latter winning six championships during his seven seasons. He played several infield positions on lesser teams in his early twenties but left field was his regular professional position.

Born 1846 in County Cavan and raised in Newark, New Jersey, Leonard is commonly recognized as the first native of Ireland to play in the major leagues. He was one of four who played during the first National Association of Professional Base Ball Players (NAPBBP) season, so he owes the distinction partly to fortunate scheduling in the spring of 1871, partly to our counting the NA as a major league. (But it seems likely that Leonard and Fergy Malone both played in the first National League game, 22 April 1876.)

Leonard played five seasons in the amateur era of the National Association of Base Ball Players (NABBP), beginning in 1864 with the Hudson River club of Newburgh, New York, not far North of the metropolis. Early in the 1866 season he moved to the Irvington club of Irvington, New Jersey, several miles inland from Newark and from the Elysian Fields, Hoboken, where many New York city teams played home matches. (At least two teammates, Hugh and Matt Campbell, were natives of Ireland.) At that time, in his early twenties, the right-handed Leonard played mainly in the infield.

== Cincinnati ==
In 1868 "Andy" and teammate Charlie Sweasy moved to Cincinnati, Ohio, and joined the Buckeyes, the chief local rival of the Red Stockings; the move suggests that he was somehow compensated by club members if not by the club.

When the NABBP permitted professionalism for 1869, Leonard was one of five new men hired by Harry Wright of the Cincinnati Red Stockings to complete the first fully professional team. He was paid $800 for the eight months from March 15 to November 15, the standard rate, while four men earned more.

All of the Red Stockings had previously played in the infield; Wright put Leonard in left, then the most active outfield position. He played nine of the next ten seasons as Harry Wright's regular left fielder, although as a right-handed thrower with early infield experience he filled in at second, third, and shortstop, too.

Years later, the son of officer George Ellard recalled the skills of each player in words of praise. Ellard (1908: 101) called the "jolly, good-natured fellow ... of Irvington-Buckeye fame" a brilliant left fielder but noted that "he ranked the best as a batsman." The limited statistical record shows that he was one of the strong supporting players during the Red Stockings innings, perhaps third behind George Wright and Waterman over the two seasons, but that may be said of a few others. In two years, he played 128 of 131 games in the record books, one of six who played essentially without interruption. More important, he filled in at shortstop for about 15 games that Wright did not play in 1870.

Cincinnati toured the continent undefeated in 1869 and may have been the strongest team in 1870, but the club dropped professional base ball after the second season.

== 1871 and after ==
Wright was hired to organize a new team in Boston, where he signed three teammates for 1871. The other five regulars including Andy Leonard signed with Nick Young's Washington Olympics, an established club that also joined the new, entirely professional National Association (NA). Wright did sign Leonard one year later and he remained in place for the Boston Red Stockings' run of six pennants in seven seasons.

In a game against St. Louis on June 14, 1876, Leonard and his teammates experienced the worst day in the field that any major league team ever has. Boston committed 24 errors in their 20-6 loss to St. Louis. Leonard, playing second base, committed nine of them. Both of those figures remain major league records. St. Louis committed 16 errors, for a two-team record total 40. (The Sporting News Baseball Record Book, 2007, p. 83) (Boston Post, June 15, 1876, p. 3, "A Miserable Fielding Display.")

Andy Leonard lost his major league job in 1879 but returned to the infield in Rochester as a shortstop, in some ways the most demanding position, one always filled by George Wright on brother Harry's professional teams. In 1880 he returned to Cincinnati and the major leagues but "failing vision forced his retirement from the game. In his final game, on July 3, 1880, his errors allowed Providence four runs in a 6-4 Cincinnati loss" (Richardson and Sumner 1989).

Leonard worked for Wright & Ditson, George Wright's sporting goods firm, for several years before his 1903 death in Boston at age 57. He is buried in New Calvary Cemetery, Boston.

== Honors ==
In the Irish Baseball League, the annual most valuable player award is named the "Andy Leonard League MVP award".
