= List of Major League Baseball annual home run leaders =

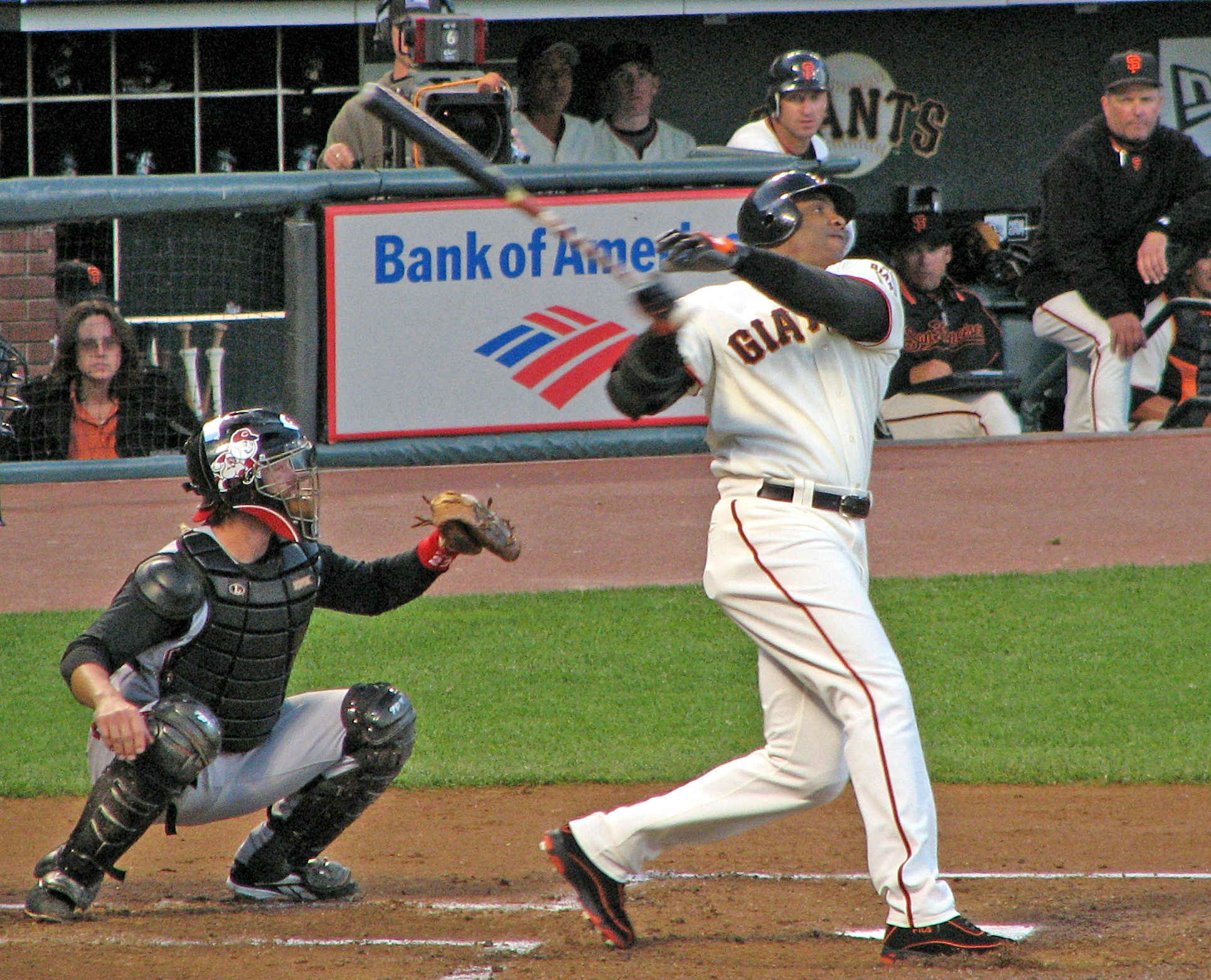
Barry Bonds, the all-time career home run leader in Major League Baseball, led the league in home runs twice including in 2001 when he set the record single-season mark

In baseball, a home run is scored when the ball is hit so far that the batter is able to circle all the bases ending at home plate, scoring himself plus any runners already on base, with no errors by the defensive team on the play. An automatic home run is achieved by hitting the ball on the fly over the outfield fence in fair territory. More rarely, an inside-the-park home run occurs when the hitter reaches home plate while the baseball remains in play on the field. In Major League Baseball (MLB), a player in each league^{[L]} wins the home run title each season by hitting the most home runs that year. Only home runs hit in a particular league count towards that league's seasonal lead. Mark McGwire, for example, hit 58 home runs in 1997, more than any other player that year. However, McGwire was traded from the American League's (AL) Oakland Athletics to the National League's (NL) St. Louis Cardinals midway through the season and his individual AL and NL home run totals (34 and 24, respectively) did not qualify to lead either league.

The first home run champion in the National League was George Hall. In the league's inaugural 1876 season, Hall hit five home runs for the short-lived National League Philadelphia Athletics. In 1901, the American League was established and Hall of Fame second baseman Nap Lajoie led it with 14 home runs for the American League Philadelphia Athletics. Over the course of his 22-season career, Babe Ruth led the American League in home runs twelve times. Mike Schmidt and Ralph Kiner have the second and third most home run titles respectively, Schmidt with eight and Kiner with seven, all won in the National League. Kiner's seven consecutive titles from 1946 to 1952 are also the most consecutive home run titles by any player.

Ruth set the Major League Baseball single-season home run record four times, first at 29 (1919), then 54 (1920), 59 (1921), and finally 60 (1927), all in the American League. Ruth's 1920 and 1921 seasons are tied for the widest margin of victory for a home run champion as he topped the next highest total by 35 home runs in each season. The single season mark of 60 stood for 34 years until Roger Maris hit 61 home runs in 1961 in the American League for which MLB assigned an asterisk until reversing themselves in 1991, citing Maris had accomplished his record in a longer season. Maris' league-wide record remained unbroken for 37 years until two National League players, Mark McGwire and Sammy Sosa, both hit more than 62 home runs during the 1998 home run record chase, with McGwire ultimately setting the new record of 70, This record passed both Maris' American League record and the previous National League record, set 68 years earlier by Hack Wilson with 56 in 1930. Barry Bonds, who also has the most career home runs, then broke McGwire's record three years later, setting the existing single season record of 73 in 2001, again in the National League. The American League record was set in 2022 after being held by Roger Maris for 61 years, when Aaron Judge hit 62 homeruns.

The 1998 and 2001 seasons each had four players hit 50 or more home runs – Greg Vaughn, Ken Griffey Jr., Sosa, and McGwire in 1998 and Alex Rodriguez, Luis Gonzalez, Sosa, and Bonds in 2001. A player has hit 50 or more home runs 42 times, 25 times since 1990. Only seven players have hit 60 or more in one season, with Aaron Judge (2022) and Cal Raleigh (2025) the most recent. The lowest home run total to lead a major league was four, recorded in the NL by Lip Pike in 1877 and Paul Hines in 1878.

== Key ==
Winner(s)	Player(s) with the most home runs (HR) in the league
HR	The winner's home run total
Runner(s)-up	Player(s) with the second-most HRs in the league
2nd HR	The runner-up home run total
League	Denoted only for players outside of the modern major leagues
†	Member of the National Baseball Hall of Fame and Museum

== American League ==
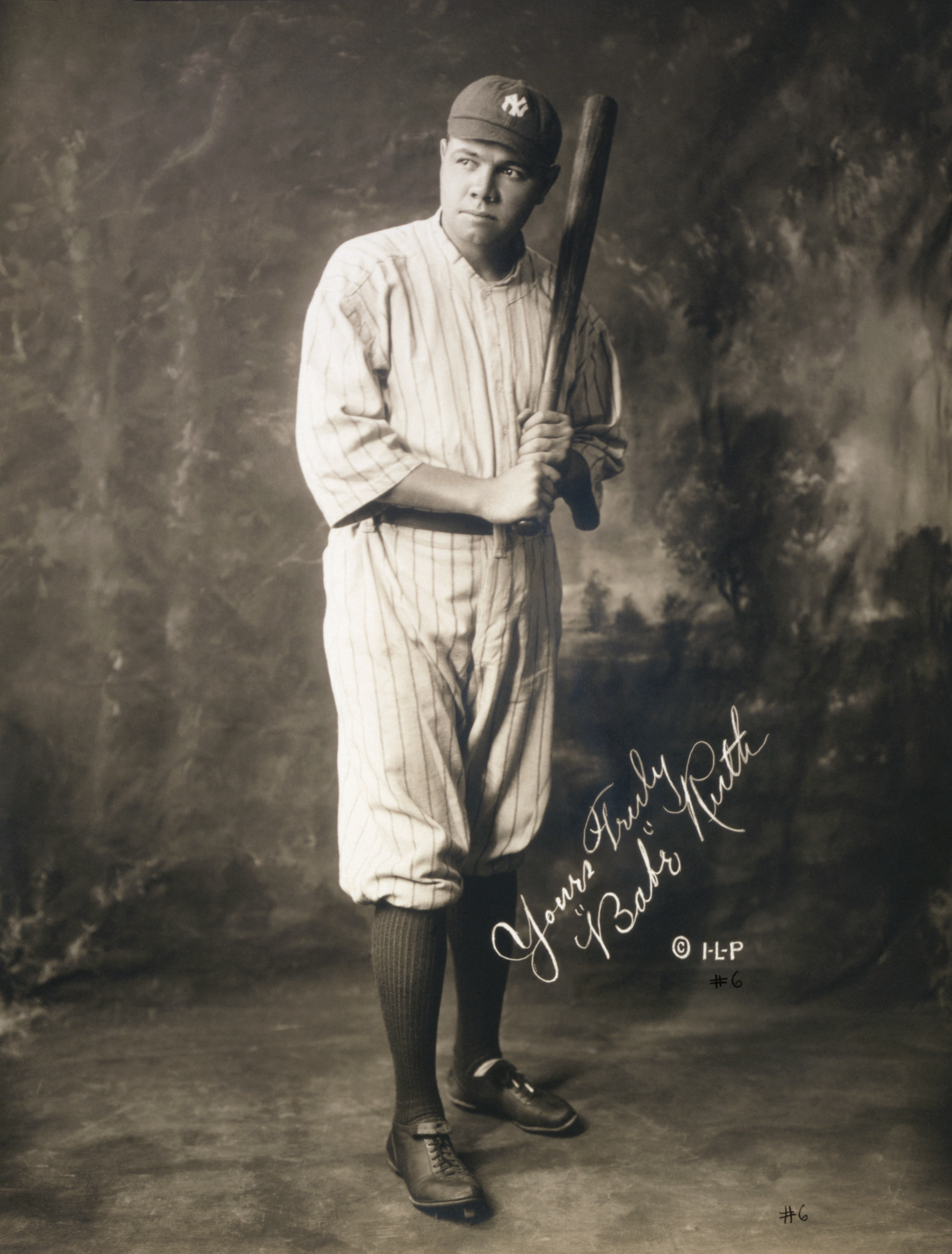
Babe Ruth was first or second in the American League in home runs for every season from 1918 through 1933 except 1922 and set the single-season home run record four times.

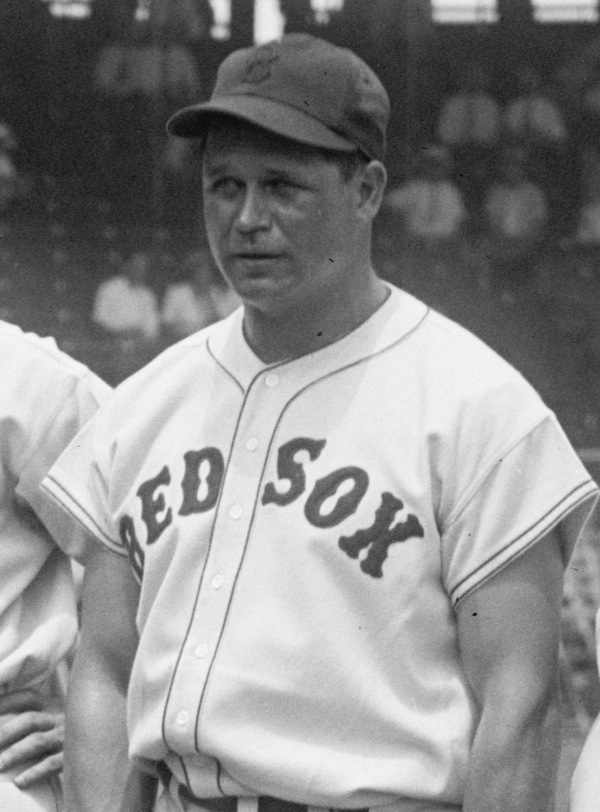
Jimmie Foxx hit 50 home runs in 1938 but finished second in the league to Hank Greenberg who hit 58 that year.

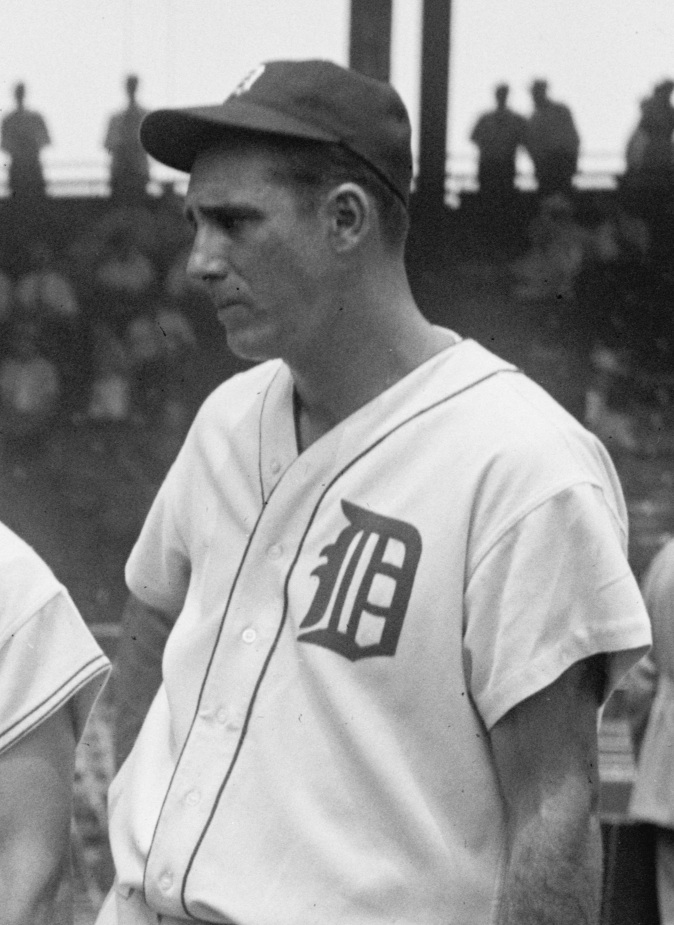
Hank Greenberg, Hall of Famer and 4-time home run champion

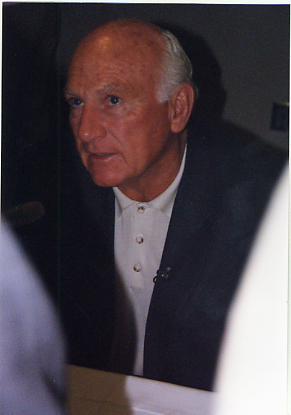
Harmon Killebrew led the league in home runs six times for the Minnesota Twins franchise, once while the team was in Washington and five times in Minnesota.

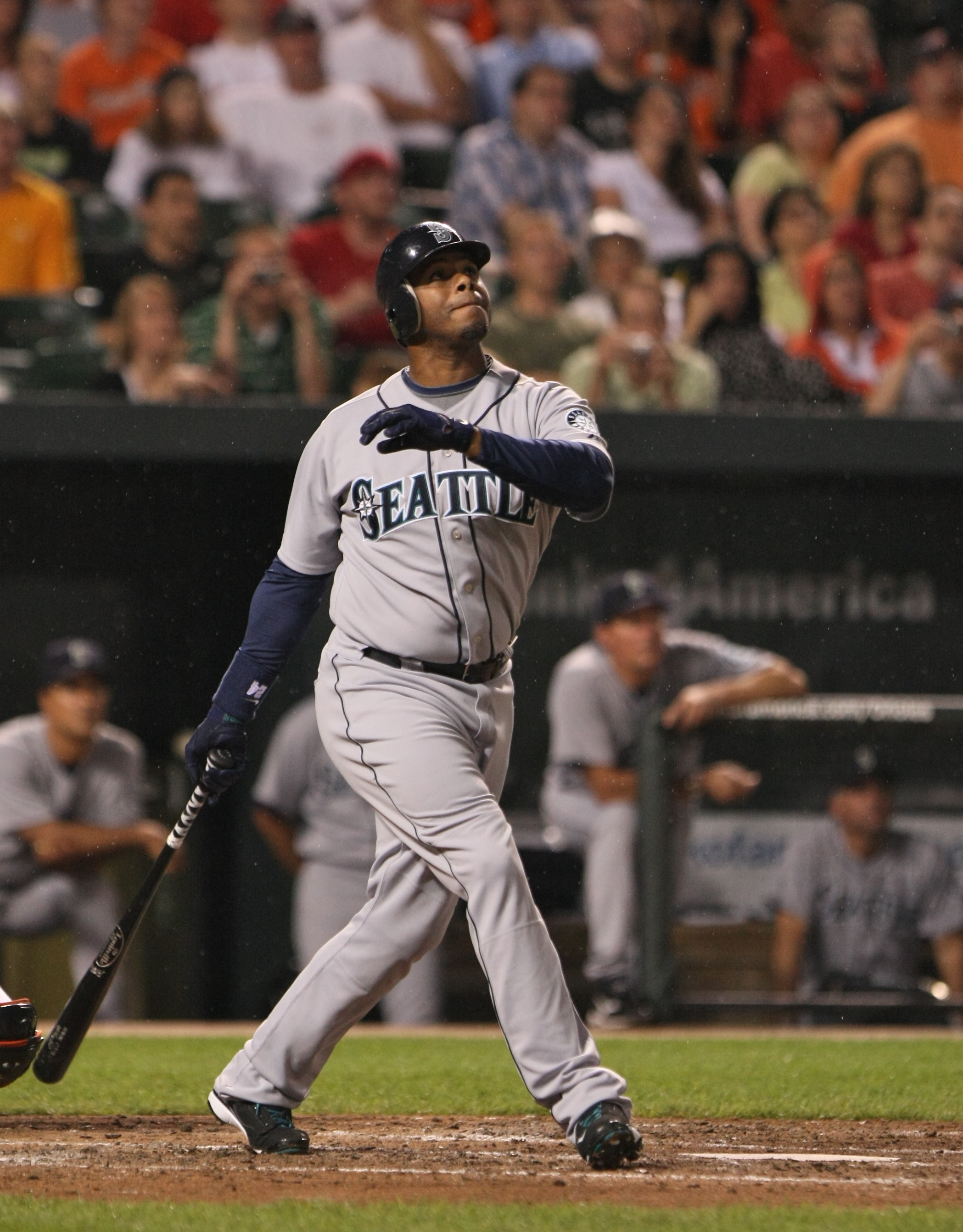
Ken Griffey Jr. led the American League in home runs in four seasons during the 1990s, including three consecutively from 1997 to 1999.

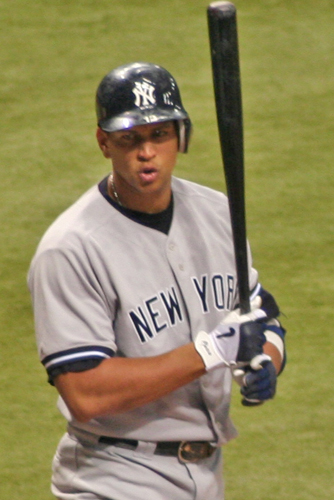
Alex Rodriguez led the American League in home runs five times, three with the Texas Rangers and twice with the New York Yankees.

Year	Winner(s)	HR	Team	Runner(s)-up	2nd HR	Ref
1901	Nap Lajoie^{†}	14	Philadelphia Athletics	Buck Freeman	12	
1902	Socks Seybold	16	Philadelphia Athletics	Charlie Hickman; Bill Bradley; Buck Freeman	11	
1903	Buck Freeman	13	Boston Americans	Charlie Hickman	12	
1904	Harry Davis	10	Philadelphia Athletics	Danny Murphy; Buck Freeman	7	
1905	Harry Davis	8	Philadelphia Athletics	George Stone	7	
1906	Harry Davis	12	Philadelphia Athletics	Charlie Hickman	9	
1907	Harry Davis	8	Philadelphia Athletics	Socks Seybold; Danny Hoffman; Ty Cobb^{†}	5	
1908	Sam Crawford^{†}	7	Detroit Tigers	Bill Hinchman	6	
1909	Ty Cobb^{†}	9	Detroit Tigers	Tris Speaker^{†}	7	
1910	Jake Stahl	10	Boston Red Sox	Ty Cobb^{†} Duffy Lewis	8	
1911	Frank Baker^{†}	11	Philadelphia Athletics	Tris Speaker^{†} Ty Cobb^{†}	8	
1912	Frank Baker^{†} Tris Speaker^{†}	10	Philadelphia Athletics; Boston Red Sox	Ty Cobb^{†}	7	
1913	Frank Baker^{†}	12	Philadelphia Athletics	Sam Crawford^{†}	9	
1914	Frank Baker^{†}	9	Philadelphia Athletics	Sam Crawford^{†}	8	
1915	Braggo Roth	7	Chicago White Sox; Cleveland Indians	Rube Oldring	6	
1916	Wally Pipp	12	New York Yankees	Frank Baker^{†}	10	
1917	Wally Pipp	9	New York Yankees	Bobby Veach	8	
1918	Babe Ruth^{†} Tilly Walker	11	Boston Red Sox; Philadelphia Athletics	Frank Baker^{†} George Burns	6	
1919	Babe Ruth^{†}	29	Boston Red Sox	Tilly Walker; Frank Baker^{†} George Sisler^{†}	10	
1920	Babe Ruth^{†}	54	New York Yankees	George Sisler^{†}	19	
1921	Babe Ruth^{†}	59	New York Yankees	Ken Williams; Bob Meusel	24	
1922	Ken Williams	39	St. Louis Browns	Tilly Walker	37	
1923	Babe Ruth^{†}	41	New York Yankees	Ken Williams	29	
1924	Babe Ruth^{†}	46	New York Yankees	Joe Hauser	27	
1925	Bob Meusel	33	New York Yankees	Babe Ruth^{†} Ken Williams	25	
1926	Babe Ruth^{†}	47	New York Yankees	Al Simmons^{†}	19	
1927	Babe Ruth^{†}	60	New York Yankees	Lou Gehrig^{†}	47	
1928	Babe Ruth^{†}	54	New York Yankees	Lou Gehrig^{†}	27	
1929	Babe Ruth^{†}	46	New York Yankees	Lou Gehrig^{†}	35	
1930	Babe Ruth^{†}	49	New York Yankees	Lou Gehrig^{†}	41	
1931	Babe Ruth^{†} Lou Gehrig^{†}	46	New York Yankees	Earl Averill	32	
1932	Jimmie Foxx^{†}	58	Philadelphia Athletics	Babe Ruth^{†}	41	
1933	Jimmie Foxx^{†}	48	Philadelphia Athletics	Babe Ruth^{†}	34	
1934	Lou Gehrig^{†}	49	New York Yankees	Jimmie Foxx^{†}	44	
1935	Hank Greenberg^{†} Jimmie Foxx^{†}	36	Detroit Tigers; Philadelphia Athletics	Lou Gehrig^{†}	30	
1936	Lou Gehrig^{†}	49	New York Yankees	Hal Trosky	42	
1937	Joe DiMaggio^{†}	46	New York Yankees	Hank Greenberg^{†}	40	
1938	Hank Greenberg^{†}	58	Detroit Tigers	Jimmie Foxx^{†}	50	
1939	Jimmie Foxx^{†}	35	Boston Red Sox	Hank Greenberg^{†}	33	
1940	Hank Greenberg^{†}	41	Detroit Tigers	Jimmie Foxx^{†}	36	
1941	Ted Williams^{†}	37	Boston Red Sox	Charlie Keller	33	
1942	Ted Williams^{†}	36	Boston Red Sox	Chet Laabs	27	
1943	Rudy York	34	Detroit Tigers	Charlie Keller	31	
1944	Nick Etten	22	New York Yankees	Vern Stephens	20	
1945	Vern Stephens	24	St. Louis Browns	Roy Cullenbine; Nick Etten; Rudy York	18	
1946	Hank Greenberg^{†}	44	Detroit Tigers	Ted Williams^{†}	38	
1947	Ted Williams^{†}	32	Boston Red Sox	Joe Gordon^{†}	29	
1948	Joe DiMaggio^{†}	39	New York Yankees	Joe Gordon^{†}	32	
1949	Ted Williams^{†}	43	Boston Red Sox	Vern Stephens	39	
1950	Al Rosen	37	Cleveland Indians	Walt Dropo	34	
1951	Gus Zernial	33	Chicago White Sox; Philadelphia Athletics	Ted Williams^{†}	30	
1952	Larry Doby^{†}	32	Cleveland Indians	Luke Easter	31	
1953	Al Rosen	43	Cleveland Indians	Gus Zernial	42	
1954	Larry Doby^{†}	32	Cleveland Indians	Ted Williams^{†}	29	
1955	Mickey Mantle^{†}	37	New York Yankees	Gus Zernial	30	
1956	Mickey Mantle^{†}	52	New York Yankees	Vic Wertz	32	
1957	Roy Sievers	42	Washington Senators	Ted Williams^{†}	38	
1958	Mickey Mantle^{†}	42	New York Yankees	Rocky Colavito	41	
1959	Harmon Killebrew^{†} Rocky Colavito	42	Washington Senators; Cleveland Indians	Jim Lemon	33	
1960	Mickey Mantle^{†}	40	New York Yankees	Roger Maris	39	
1961	Roger Maris	61	New York Yankees	Mickey Mantle^{†}	54	
1962	Harmon Killebrew^{†}	48	Minnesota Twins	Norm Cash	39	
1963	Harmon Killebrew^{†}	45	Minnesota Twins	Dick Stuart	42	
1964	Harmon Killebrew^{†}	49	Minnesota Twins	Boog Powell	39	
1965	Tony Conigliaro	32	Boston Red Sox	Norm Cash	30	
1966	Frank Robinson^{†}	49	Baltimore Orioles	Harmon Killebrew^{†}	39	
1967	Carl Yastrzemski^{†} Harmon Killebrew^{†}	44	Boston Red Sox; Minnesota Twins	Frank Howard	36	
1968	Frank Howard	44	Washington Senators	Willie Horton	36	
1969	Harmon Killebrew^{†}	49	Minnesota Twins	Frank Howard	48	
1970	Frank Howard	44	Washington Senators	Harmon Killebrew^{†}	41	
1971	Bill Melton	33	Chicago White Sox	Reggie Jackson^{†} Norm Cash	32	
1972	Dick Allen^{†}	37	Chicago White Sox	Bobby Murcer	33	
1973	Reggie Jackson^{†}	32	Oakland Athletics	Jeff Burroughs; Frank Robinson^{†}	30	
1974	Dick Allen^{†}	32	Chicago White Sox	Reggie Jackson^{†}	29	
1975	Reggie Jackson^{†} George Scott	36	Oakland Athletics; Milwaukee Brewers	John Mayberry	34	
1976	Graig Nettles	32	New York Yankees	Reggie Jackson^{†} Sal Bando	27	
1977	Jim Rice^{†}	39	Boston Red Sox	Graig Nettles; Bobby Bonds	37	
1978	Jim Rice^{†}	46	Boston Red Sox	Larry Hisle; Don Baylor	34	
1979	Gorman Thomas	45	Milwaukee Brewers	Fred Lynn; Jim Rice^{†}	39	
1980	Reggie Jackson^{†} Ben Oglivie	41	New York Yankees; Milwaukee Brewers	Gorman Thomas	38	
1981	Bobby Grich; Eddie Murray^{†} Dwight Evans; Tony Armas	22	California Angels; Baltimore Orioles; Boston Red Sox; Oakland Athletics	Gorman Thomas; Greg Luzinski	21	
1982	Reggie Jackson^{†} Gorman Thomas	39	California Angels; Milwaukee Brewers	Dave Winfield^{†}	37	
1983	Jim Rice^{†}	39	Boston Red Sox	Tony Armas	36	
1984	Tony Armas	43	Boston Red Sox	Dave Kingman	35	
1985	Darrell Evans	40	Detroit Tigers	Carlton Fisk^{†}	37	
1986	Jesse Barfield	40	Toronto Blue Jays	Dave Kingman	35	
1987	Mark McGwire	49	Oakland Athletics	George Bell	47	
1988	José Canseco	42	Oakland Athletics	Fred McGriff^{†}	34	
1989	Fred McGriff^{†}	36	Toronto Blue Jays	Joe Carter	35	
1990	Cecil Fielder	51	Detroit Tigers	Mark McGwire	39	
1991	José Canseco; Cecil Fielder	44	Oakland Athletics; Detroit Tigers	Cal Ripken Jr.^{†}	34	
1992	Juan González	43	Texas Rangers	Mark McGwire	42	
1993	Juan González	46	Texas Rangers	Ken Griffey Jr.^{†}	45	
1994	Ken Griffey Jr.^{†}	40	Seattle Mariners	Frank Thomas^{†}	38	
1995	Albert Belle	50	Cleveland Indians	Jay Buhner; Frank Thomas^{†}	40	
1996	Mark McGwire	52	Oakland Athletics	Brady Anderson	50	
1997	Ken Griffey Jr.^{†}	56	Seattle Mariners	Tino Martinez	44	
1998	Ken Griffey Jr.^{†}	56	Seattle Mariners	Albert Belle	49	
1999	Ken Griffey Jr.^{†}	48	Seattle Mariners	Rafael Palmeiro	47	
2000	Troy Glaus	47	Anaheim Angels	Jason Giambi; Frank Thomas^{†}	43	
2001	Alex Rodriguez	52	Texas Rangers	Jim Thome^{†}	49	
2002	Alex Rodriguez	57	Texas Rangers	Jim Thome^{†}	52	
2003	Alex Rodriguez	47	Texas Rangers	Carlos Delgado	42	
2004	Manny Ramirez	43	Boston Red Sox	Paul Konerko; David Ortiz^{†}	41	
2005	Alex Rodriguez	48	New York Yankees	David Ortiz^{†}	47	
2006	David Ortiz^{†}	54	Boston Red Sox	Jermaine Dye	44	
2007	Alex Rodriguez	54	New York Yankees	Carlos Peña	46	
2008	Miguel Cabrera	37	Detroit Tigers	Carlos Quentin	36	
2009	Carlos Peña; Mark Teixeira	39	Tampa Bay Rays; New York Yankees	Jason Bay; Aaron Hill	36	
2010	José Bautista	54	Toronto Blue Jays	Paul Konerko	39	
2011	José Bautista	43	Toronto Blue Jays	Curtis Granderson	41	
2012	Miguel Cabrera	44	Detroit Tigers	Curtis Granderson; Josh Hamilton	43	
2013	Chris Davis	53	Baltimore Orioles	Miguel Cabrera	44	
2014	Nelson Cruz	40	Baltimore Orioles	Chris Carter	37	
2015	Chris Davis	47	Baltimore Orioles	Nelson Cruz	44	
2016	Mark Trumbo	47	Baltimore Orioles	Nelson Cruz	43	
2017	Aaron Judge	52	New York Yankees	Khris Davis	43	
2018	Khris Davis	48	Oakland Athletics	J. D. Martinez	43	
2019	Jorge Soler	48	Kansas City Royals	Mike Trout	45	
2020	Luke Voit	22	New York Yankees	José Abreu	19	
2021	Vladimir Guerrero Jr. Salvador Perez	48	Toronto Blue Jays; Kansas City Royals	Shohei Ohtani	46	
2022	Aaron Judge	62	New York Yankees	Mike Trout	40	
2023	Shohei Ohtani	44	Los Angeles Angels	Adolis García	39	
2024	Aaron Judge	58	New York Yankees	Anthony Santander	44	
2025	Cal Raleigh	60	Seattle Mariners	Aaron Judge	53	
2026	Pete Alonso	43	Baltimore Orioles	Yordan Alvarez; Junior Caminero	42	

== National League ==
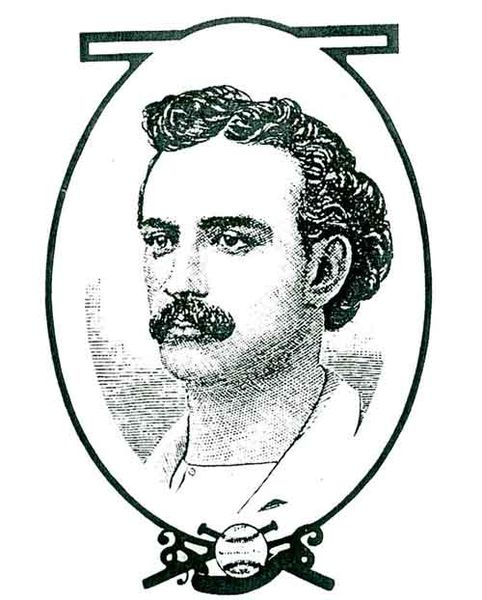
Lip Pike led the league with four home runs in 1877, tied with Paul Hines for the lowest total to ever lead a league.

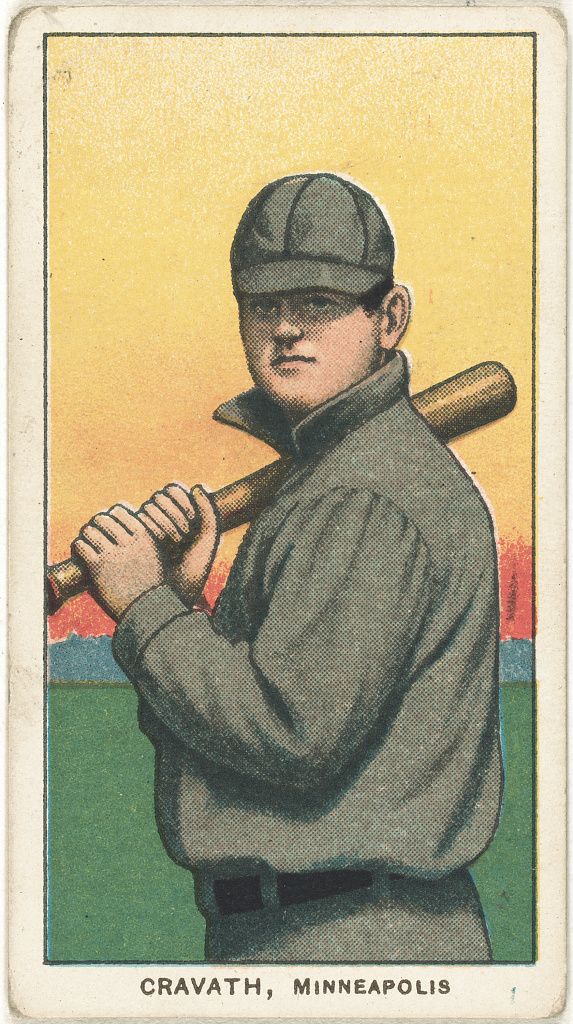
Gavvy Cravath won six home run titles in the 1910s.

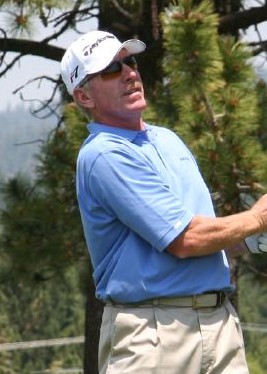
Mike Schmidt led the National League in home runs eight times, the second most such titles in MLB history.

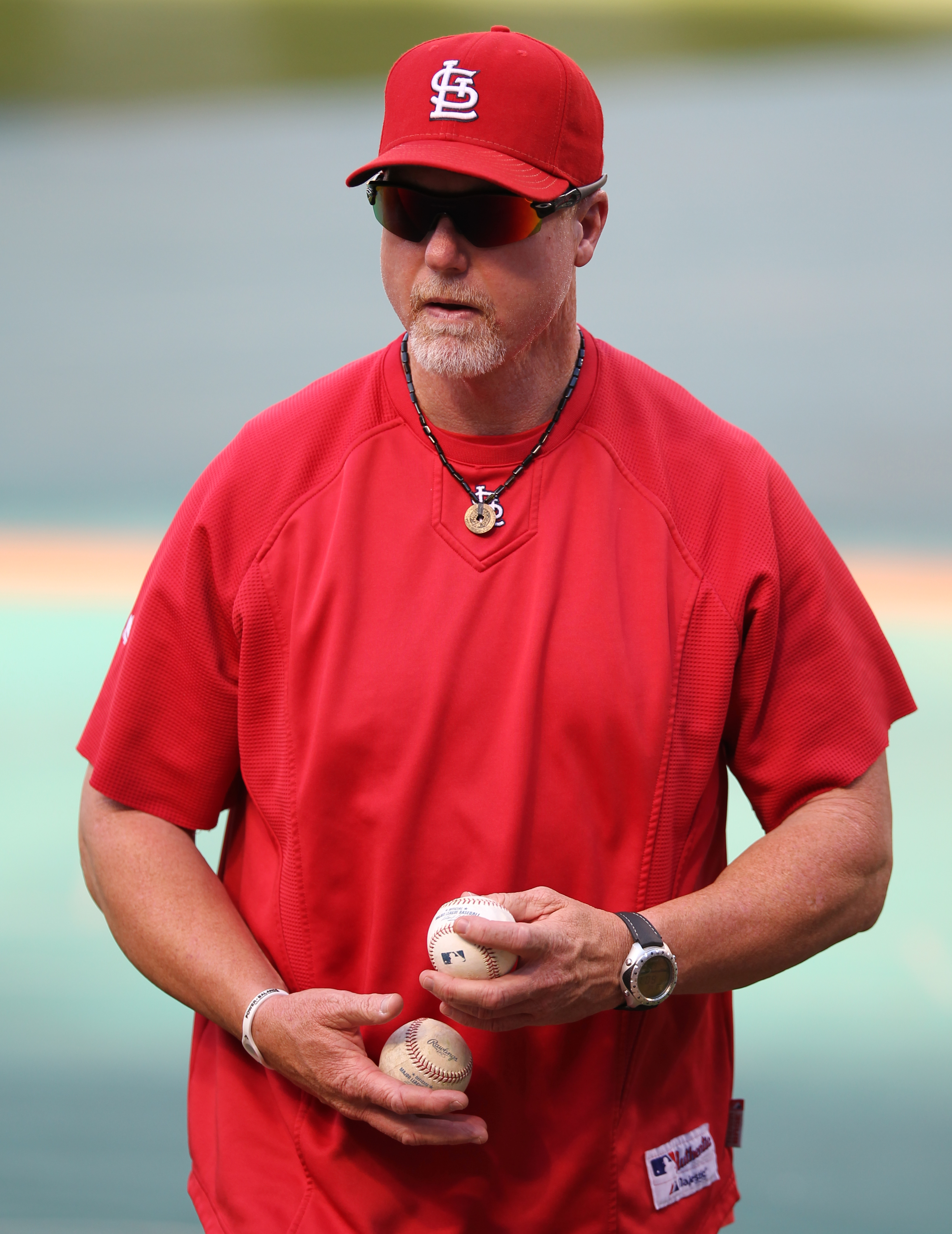
Mark McGwire led the league in home runs 4 times including 52, 65, and record-breaking 70 home run seasons. His 58 home runs in 1997 led neither league due to a mid-season trade which split this total across 2 leagues.

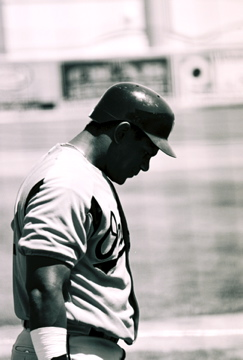
Sammy Sosa led the National League in home runs twice, with 49 and 50, but finished second four times with home run counts of 36, 66, 63, and 64.

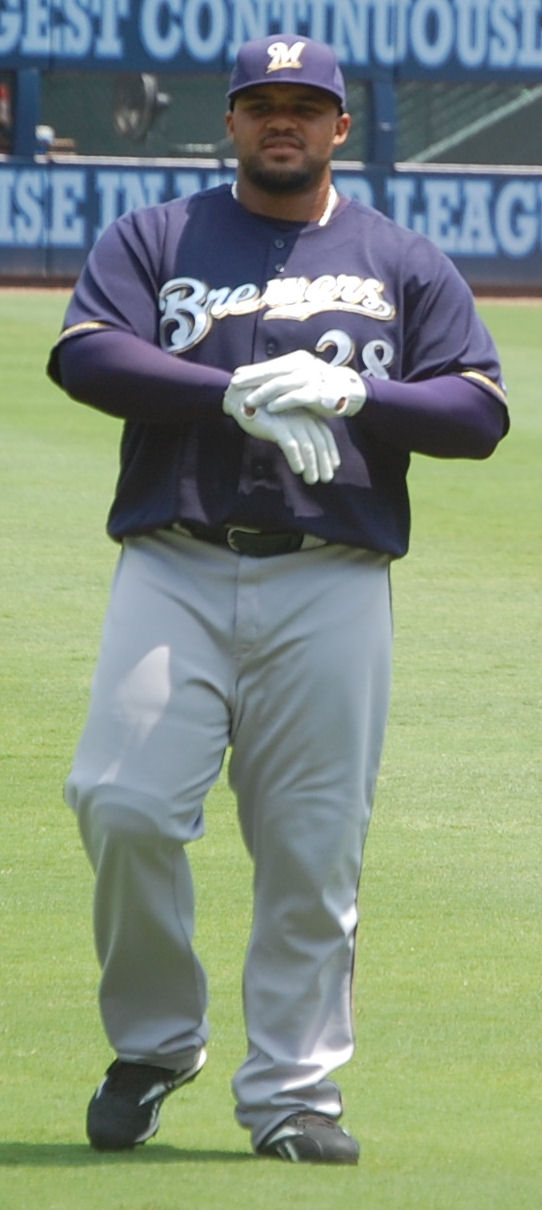
Prince Fielder won a National League home run title in 2007 while his father, Cecil Fielder, won two in the American League in 1990 and 1991.

Year	Winner(s)	HR	Team	Runner(s)-up	2nd HR	Ref
1876	George Hall	5	Philadelphia Athletics (NL)	Charley Jones	4	
1877	Lip Pike	4	Cincinnati Reds	Orator Shafer	3	
1878	Paul Hines	4	Providence Grays	Charley Jones	3	
1879	Charley Jones	9	Boston Red Caps	Jim O'Rourke^{†}	6	
1880	Harry Stovey; Jim O'Rourke^{†}	6	Worcester Ruby Legs; Boston Red Caps	Charley Jones	5	
1881	Dan Brouthers^{†}	8	Buffalo Bisons	Charlie Bennett	7	
1882	George Wood	7	Detroit Wolverines	Mike Muldoon; Dan Brouthers^{†}	6	
1883	Buck Ewing^{†}	10	New York Giants	Jerry Denny; Joe Hornung	8	
1884	Ned Williamson	27	Chicago White Stockings	Fred Pfeffer	25	
1885	Abner Dalrymple	11	Chicago White Stockings	King Kelly^{†}	9	
1886	Dan Brouthers^{†} Hardy Richardson	11	Detroit Wolverines	Cap Anson^{†}	10	
1887	Billy O'Brien	19	Washington Nationals	Roger Connor^{†}	17	
1888	Jimmy Ryan	16	Chicago White Stockings	Roger Connor^{†}	14	
1889	Sam Thompson^{†}	20	Philadelphia Quakers	Jerry Denny	18	
1890	Oyster Burns; Mike Tiernan; Walt Wilmot	13	Brooklyn Bridegrooms; New York Giants; Chicago Colts	Herman Long	8	
1891	Mike Tiernan; Harry Stovey	16	New York Giants; Boston Beaneaters	Walt Wilmot	11	
1892	Bug Holliday	13	Cincinnati Reds	Roger Connor^{†}	12	
1893	Ed Delahanty^{†}	19	Philadelphia Phillies	Jack Clements	17	
1894	Hugh Duffy^{†}	18	Boston Beaneaters	Bill Joyce; Bobby Lowe	17	
1895	Sam Thompson^{†}	18	Philadelphia Phillies	Bill Joyce	17	
1896	Bill Joyce^{†} Ed Delahanty^{†}	13	Washington/New York; Philadelphia Phillies	Sam Thompson^{†}	12	
1897	Hugh Duffy^{†}	11	Boston Beaneaters	George Davis^{†}	10	
1898	Jimmy Collins^{†}	15	Boston Beaneaters	Bill Joyce; Honus Wagner^{†}	10	
1899	Buck Freeman	25	Washington Senators	Bobby Wallace	12	
1900	Herman Long	12	Boston Beaneaters	Elmer Flick^{†}	11	
1901	Sam Crawford^{†}	16	Cincinnati Reds	Jimmy Sheckard	11	
1902	Tommy Leach	6	Pittsburgh Pirates	Jake Beckley^{†}	5	
1903	Jimmy Sheckard	9	Brooklyn Superbas	Pat Moran; Tommy Leach; Mike Donlin; Sam Mertes; Cy Seymour; Ginger Beaumont	7	
1904	Harry Lumley	9	Brooklyn Superbas	Dave Brain	7	
1905	Fred Odwell	9	Cincinnati Reds	Cy Seymour	8	
1906	Tim Jordan	12	Brooklyn Superbas	Harry Lumley	9	
1907	Dave Brain	10	Boston Doves	Harry Lumley	9	
1908	Tim Jordan	12	Brooklyn Superbas	Honus Wagner^{†}	10	
1909	Red Murray	7	New York Giants	Beals Becker; Tommy Leach; Larry Doyle	6	
1910	Frank Schulte; Fred Beck	10	Chicago Cubs; Boston Doves	Jake Daubert; Larry Doyle	8	
1911	Frank Schulte	21	Chicago Cubs	Fred Luderus	16	
1912	Heinie Zimmerman	14	Chicago Cubs	Frank Schulte	12	
1913	Gavvy Cravath	19	Philadelphia Phillies	Fred Luderus	18	
1914	Gavvy Cravath	19	Philadelphia Phillies	Vic Saier	18	
1915	Gavvy Cravath	24	Philadelphia Phillies	Cy Williams	13	
1916	Cy Williams; Dave Robertson	12	Chicago Cubs; New York Giants	Gavvy Cravath	11	
1917	Gavvy Cravath; Dave Robertson	12	Philadelphia Phillies; New York Giants	Rogers Hornsby^{†}	8	
1918	Gavvy Cravath	8	Philadelphia Phillies	Walton Cruise; Cy Williams	6	
1919	Gavvy Cravath	12	Philadelphia Phillies	Benny Kauff	10	
1920	Cy Williams	15	Philadelphia Phillies	Irish Meusel	14	
1921	George Kelly^{†}	23	New York Giants	Rogers Hornsby^{†}	21	
1922	Rogers Hornsby^{†}	42	St. Louis Cardinals	Cy Williams	26	
1923	Cy Williams	41	Philadelphia Phillies	Jack Fournier	22	
1924	Jack Fournier	27	Brooklyn Robins	Rogers Hornsby^{†}	25	
1925	Rogers Hornsby^{†}	39	St. Louis Cardinals	Gabby Hartnett	24	
1926	Hack Wilson^{†}	21	Chicago Cubs	Jim Bottomley^{†}	19	
1927	Cy Williams; Hack Wilson^{†}	30	Philadelphia Phillies; Chicago Cubs	Rogers Hornsby^{†}	26	
1928	Hack Wilson^{†} Jim Bottomley^{†}	31	Chicago Cubs; St. Louis Cardinals	Chick Hafey	27	
1929	Chuck Klein^{†}	43	Philadelphia Phillies	Mel Ott^{†}	42	
1930	Hack Wilson^{†}	56	Chicago Cubs	Chuck Klein	40	
1931	Chuck Klein^{†}	31	Philadelphia Phillies	Mel Ott^{†}	29	
1932	Chuck Klein^{†} Mel Ott^{†}	38	Philadelphia Phillies; New York Giants	Bill Terry^{†}	28	
1933	Chuck Klein^{†}	28	Philadelphia Phillies	Wally Berger	27	
1934	Mel Ott^{†} Ripper Collins	35	New York Giants; St. Louis Cardinals	Wally Berger	34	
1935	Wally Berger	34	Boston Braves	Mel Ott^{†}	31	
1936	Mel Ott^{†}	33	New York Giants	Dolph Camilli	28	
1937	Mel Ott^{†} Joe Medwick^{†}	31	New York Giants; St. Louis Cardinals	Dolph Camilli	27	
1938	Mel Ott^{†}	36	New York Giants	Ival Goodman	30	
1939	Johnny Mize^{†}	28	St. Louis Cardinals	Mel Ott^{†}	27	
1940	Johnny Mize^{†}	43	St. Louis Cardinals	Bill Nicholson	25	
1941	Dolph Camilli	34	Brooklyn Dodgers	Mel Ott^{†}	27	
1942	Mel Ott^{†}	30	New York Giants	Dolph Camilli; Johnny Mize	26	
1943	Bill Nicholson	29	Chicago Cubs	Mel Ott^{†}	18	
1944	Bill Nicholson	33	Chicago Cubs	Mel Ott^{†}	26	
1945	Tommy Holmes	28	Boston Braves	Chuck Workman	25	
1946	Ralph Kiner^{†}	23	Pittsburgh Pirates	Johnny Mize^{†}	22	
1947	Ralph Kiner^{†} Johnny Mize^{†}	51	Pittsburgh Pirates; New York Giants	Willard Marshall	36	
1948	Ralph Kiner^{†} Johnny Mize^{†}	40	Pittsburgh Pirates; New York Giants	Stan Musial^{†}	39	
1949	Ralph Kiner^{†}	54	Pittsburgh Pirates	Stan Musial^{†}	36	
1950	Ralph Kiner^{†}	47	Pittsburgh Pirates	Andy Pafko	36	
1951	Ralph Kiner^{†}	42	Pittsburgh Pirates	Gil Hodges^{†}	40	
1952	Ralph Kiner^{†} Hank Sauer	37	Pittsburgh Pirates; Chicago Cubs	Gil Hodges^{†}	32	
1953	Eddie Mathews^{†}	47	Milwaukee Braves	Duke Snider^{†}	42	
1954	Ted Kluszewski	49	Cincinnati Redlegs	Gil Hodges^{†}	42	
1955	Willie Mays^{†}	51	New York Giants	Ted Kluszewski	47	
1956	Duke Snider^{†}	43	Brooklyn Dodgers	Joe Adcock; Frank Robinson^{†}	38	
1957	Hank Aaron^{†}	44	Milwaukee Braves	Ernie Banks^{†}	43	
1958	Ernie Banks^{†}	47	Chicago Cubs	Frank Thomas	35	
1959	Eddie Mathews^{†}	46	Milwaukee Braves	Ernie Banks^{†}	45	
1960	Ernie Banks^{†}	41	Chicago Cubs	Hank Aaron^{†}	40	
1961	Orlando Cepeda^{†}	46	San Francisco Giants	Willie Mays^{†}	40	
1962	Willie Mays^{†}	49	San Francisco Giants	Hank Aaron^{†}	45	
1963	Willie McCovey^{†} Hank Aaron^{†}	44	San Francisco Giants; Milwaukee Braves	Willie Mays^{†}	38	
1964	Willie Mays^{†}	47	San Francisco Giants	Billy Williams^{†}	33	
1965	Willie Mays^{†}	52	San Francisco Giants	Willie McCovey^{†}	39	
1966	Hank Aaron^{†}	44	Atlanta Braves	Dick Allen^{†}	40	
1967	Hank Aaron^{†}	39	Atlanta Braves	Jim Wynn	37	
1968	Willie McCovey^{†}	36	San Francisco Giants	Dick Allen^{†}	33	
1969	Willie McCovey^{†}	45	San Francisco Giants	Hank Aaron^{†}	44	
1970	Johnny Bench^{†}	45	Cincinnati Reds	Billy Williams^{†}	42	
1971	Willie Stargell^{†}	48	Pittsburgh Pirates	Hank Aaron^{†}	47	
1972	Johnny Bench^{†}	40	Cincinnati Reds	Nate Colbert	38	
1973	Willie Stargell^{†}	44	Pittsburgh Pirates	Davey Johnson	43	
1974	Mike Schmidt^{†}	36	Philadelphia Phillies	Johnny Bench^{†}	33	
1975	Mike Schmidt^{†}	38	Philadelphia Phillies	Dave Kingman	36	
1976	Mike Schmidt^{†}	38	Philadelphia Phillies	Dave Kingman	37	
1977	George Foster	52	Cincinnati Reds	Jeff Burroughs	41	
1978	George Foster	40	Cincinnati Reds	Greg Luzinski	35	
1979	Dave Kingman	48	Chicago Cubs	Mike Schmidt^{†}	45	
1980	Mike Schmidt^{†}	48	Philadelphia Phillies	Bob Horner	35	
1981	Mike Schmidt^{†}	31	Philadelphia Phillies	Andre Dawson^{†}	24	
1982	Dave Kingman	37	New York Mets	Dale Murphy	36	
1983	Mike Schmidt^{†}	40	Philadelphia Phillies	Dale Murphy	36	
1984	Mike Schmidt^{†} Dale Murphy	36	Philadelphia Phillies; Atlanta Braves	Gary Carter^{†}	27	
1985	Dale Murphy	37	Atlanta Braves	Dave Parker^{†}	34	
1986	Mike Schmidt^{†}	37	Philadelphia Phillies	Glenn Davis; Dave Parker^{†}	31	
1987	Andre Dawson^{†}	49	Chicago Cubs	Dale Murphy	44	
1988	Darryl Strawberry	39	New York Mets	Glenn Davis	30	
1989	Kevin Mitchell	47	San Francisco Giants	Howard Johnson	36	
1990	Ryne Sandberg^{†}	40	Chicago Cubs	Darryl Strawberry	37	
1991	Howard Johnson	38	New York Mets	Matt Williams	34	
1992	Fred McGriff^{†}	35	San Diego Padres	Barry Bonds	34	
1993	Barry Bonds	46	San Francisco Giants	David Justice	40	
1994	Matt Williams	43	San Francisco Giants	Jeff Bagwell^{†}	39	
1995	Dante Bichette	40	Colorado Rockies	Larry Walker^{†} Sammy Sosa	36	
1996	Andrés Galarraga	47	Colorado Rockies	Barry Bonds; Gary Sheffield	42	
1997	Larry Walker^{†}	49	Colorado Rockies	Jeff Bagwell^{†}	43	
1998	Mark McGwire	70	St. Louis Cardinals	Sammy Sosa	66	
1999	Mark McGwire	65	St. Louis Cardinals	Sammy Sosa	63	
2000	Sammy Sosa	50	Chicago Cubs	Barry Bonds	49	
2001	Barry Bonds	73	San Francisco Giants	Sammy Sosa	64	
2002	Sammy Sosa	49	Chicago Cubs	Barry Bonds	46	
2003	Jim Thome^{†}	47	Philadelphia Phillies	Richie Sexson; Barry Bonds	45	
2004	Adrián Beltré^{†}	48	Los Angeles Dodgers	Adam Dunn; Albert Pujols	46	
2005	Andruw Jones^{†}	51	Atlanta Braves	Derrek Lee	46	
2006	Ryan Howard	58	Philadelphia Phillies	Albert Pujols	49	
2007	Prince Fielder	50	Milwaukee Brewers	Ryan Howard	47	
2008	Ryan Howard	48	Philadelphia Phillies	Adam Dunn	40	
2009	Albert Pujols	47	St. Louis Cardinals	Prince Fielder	46	
2010	Albert Pujols	42	St. Louis Cardinals	Adam Dunn	38	
2011	Matt Kemp	39	Los Angeles Dodgers	Prince Fielder	38	
2012	Ryan Braun	41	Milwaukee Brewers	Giancarlo Stanton	37	
2013	Pedro Álvarez; Paul Goldschmidt	36	Pittsburgh Pirates; Arizona Diamondbacks	Jay Bruce	30	
2014	Giancarlo Stanton	37	Miami Marlins	Anthony Rizzo	32	
2015	Nolan Arenado; Bryce Harper	42	Colorado Rockies; Washington Nationals	Carlos González	40	
2016	Nolan Arenado; Chris Carter	41	Colorado Rockies; Milwaukee Brewers	Kris Bryant	39	
2017	Giancarlo Stanton	59	Miami Marlins	Cody Bellinger	39	
2018	Nolan Arenado	38	Colorado Rockies	Trevor Story	37	
2019	Pete Alonso	53	New York Mets	Eugenio Suárez	49	
2020	Marcell Ozuna	18	Atlanta Braves	Fernando Tatís Jr.	17	
2021	Fernando Tatís Jr.	42	San Diego Padres	Adam Duvall	38	
2022	Kyle Schwarber	46	Philadelphia Phillies	Pete Alonso	40	
2023	Matt Olson	54	Atlanta Braves	Kyle Schwarber	47	
2024	Shohei Ohtani	54	Los Angeles Dodgers	Marcell Ozuna	39	
2025	Kyle Schwarber	56	Philadelphia Phillies	Shohei Ohtani	55	
2026	Kyle Schwarber; Pete Crow-Armstrong	45	Philadelphia Phillies; Chicago Cubs	Matt Olson; Hunter Goodman	41	

== Other major leagues ==
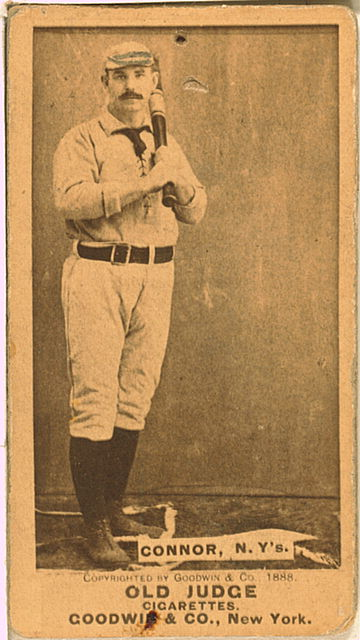
Roger Connor placed second in home runs in the National League three times and also won the Players' League's only home run title with 14 in 1890.

Year	Winner(s)	HR	Team	League	Runner(s)-up	2nd HR	Ref
1882	Oscar Walker	7	St. Louis Brown Stockings	American Association	Pete Browning	5	
1883	Harry Stovey	14	Philadelphia Athletics	American Association	Charley Jones	10	
1884	John Reilly	11	Cincinnati Red Stockings	American Association	Harry Stovey	10	
1884	Fred Dunlap	13	St. Louis Maroons	Union Association	Ed Crane	12	
1885	Harry Stovey	13	Philadelphia Athletics	American Association	Frank Fennelly	10	
1886	Bid McPhee^{†}	8	Cincinnati Red Stockings	American Association	Harry Stovey; Dave Orr	7	
1887	Tip O'Neill	14	St. Louis Browns	American Association	John Reilly	10	
1888	John Reilly	13	Cincinnati Red Stockings	American Association	Harry Stovey	9	
1889	Harry Stovey; Bug Holliday	19	Cincinnati Red Stockings; Philadelphia Athletics	American Association	Charlie Duffee	16	
1890	Count Campau	9	St. Louis Browns	American Association	Ed Cartwright	8	
1890	Roger Connor^{†}	14	New York Giants	Players' League	Hardy Richardson	13	
1891	Duke Farrell	12	Boston Reds	American Association	Jocko Milligan; Denny Lyons	11	
1914	Dutch Zwilling	16	Chicago Chi-Feds	Federal League	Bill Kenworthy	15	
1915	Hal Chase	17	Buffalo Blues	Federal League	Dutch Zwilling	13	

== Negro league baseball ==
=== Negro National League I ===
Year	Leader	HR	Team	Runner-up	HR	Ref
1920	Edgar Wesley	11	Detroit Stars	Jimmie Lyons	8	
1921	Oscar Charleston^{†}	15	St. Louis Giants	George Carr	14	
1922	Oscar Charleston^{†}	19	Indianapolis ABCs	Bullet Rogan^{†}	15	
1923	Heavy Johnson, Candy Jim Taylor	11	Kansas City Monarchs, St. Louis Stars / Toledo Tigers	Turkey Stearnes^{†}	17	
1924	Bill Pierce, Turkey Stearnes^{†}	9	Detroit Stars	Cristóbal Torriente^{†}	8	
1925	Turkey Stearnes^{†}	19	Detroit Stars	Edgar Wesley	17	
1926	Mule Suttles^{†}	32	St. Louis Stars	Dewey Creacy	23	
1927	Willie Wells^{†}	29	St. Louis Stars	Turkey Stearnes^{†}	19	
1928	Turkey Stearnes^{†}	24	Detroit Stars	Wilson Redus, Willie Wells^{†}	22	
1929	Willie Wells^{†}	26	Chicago American Giants / St. Louis Stars	Mule Suttles^{†}	18	
1930	Willie Wells^{†}	17	St. Louis Stars	Mule Suttles^{†}	13	
1931	Turkey Stearnes^{†}	8	Detroit Stars	Mule Suttles^{†}	7	

=== Eastern Colored League ===
Year	Leader	HR	Team	Runner-up	HR	Ref
1923	George Johnson	8	Hilldale Club	Charlie Mason, Jud Wilson^{†}	7	
1924	Oscar Charleston^{†}	15	Harrisburg Giants	Charlie Mason	10	
1925	Oscar Charleston^{†}	20	Harrisburg Giants	John Beckwith	15	
1926	Martín Dihigo^{†}	14	Cuban Stars (East)	Oscar Charleston^{†}, Biz Mackey^{†}	10	
1927	Oscar Charleston^{†}, Martín Dihigo^{†}	13	Harrisburg Giants, Cuban Stars (East)	Milton Lewis	11	
1928	Rap Dixon	13	Baltimore Black Sox	George Carr	9	

=== American Negro League ===
Year	Leader	HR	Team	Runner-up	HR	Ref
1929	Chino Smith	22	New York Lincoln Giants	Martín Dihigo^{†}	18	

=== East–West League ===
Year	Leader	HR	Team	Runner-up	HR	Ref
1932	Tom Finley	7	Baltimore Black Sox	Jake Dunn, Mule Suttles^{†}, Pete Washington	4	

=== Negro Southern League ===
Year	Leader	HR	Team	Runner-up	HR	Ref
1932	Steel Arm Davis, Mule Suttles^{†}	4	Chicago American Giants	Zollie Wright	3	

=== Negro National League II ===
Year	Leader	HR	Team	Runner-up	HR	Ref
1933	Josh Gibson^{†}	18	Pittsburgh Crawfords	Oscar Charleston^{†}	13	
1934	Josh Gibson^{†}	15	Pittsburgh Crawfords	Oscar Charleston^{†}	7	
1935	Josh Gibson^{†}	10	Pittsburgh Crawfords	Jud Wilson^{†}, Mule Suttles^{†}	9	
1936	Josh Gibson^{†}	18	Pittsburgh Crawfords	Mule Suttles^{†}	12	
1937	Josh Gibson^{†}	20	Homestead Grays	Buck Leonard^{†}	13	
1938	Josh Gibson^{†}, Buck Leonard^{†}	11	Homestead Grays	Mule Suttles^{†}, Ed Stone	9	
1939	Josh Gibson^{†}	13	Homestead Grays	Buck Leonard^{†}	7	
1940	Bill Hoskins, Henry McHenry, Lennie Pearson, Buster Clarkson, Buck Leonard^{†}	8	Baltimore Elite Giants, Philadelphia Stars, Newark Eagles (Pearson and Clarkson), Homestead Grays	Roy Campanella^{†}, Sammy T. Hughes	6	
1941	Buck Leonard^{†}	13	Homestead Grays	12	Bill Hoskins	
1942	Lennie Pearson	11	Newark Eagles / Homestead Grays	10	Josh Gibson^{†}	
1943	Josh Gibson^{†}	20	Homestead Grays	4	Ameal Brooks, Johnny Davis, Larry Doby^{†}, Buck Leonard^{†}, Lennie Pearson	
1944	Josh Gibson^{†}	9	Homestead Grays	Buck Leonard^{†}	7	
1945	Josh Gibson^{†}	8	Homestead Grays	Roy Campanella^{†}, Bill Hoskins, Buck Leonard^{†}, Marvin Williams, Bill Wright	5	
1946	Josh Gibson^{†}	13	Homestead Grays	Johnny Davis, Lennie Pearson	8	
1947	Monte Irvin^{†}	11	Newark Eagles	Larry Doby^{†}, Henry Kimbro	8	
1948	Luke Easter, Lester Lockett	6	Newark Eagles	Monte Irvin^{†}	5	

=== Negro American League ===
Year	Leader	HR	Team	Runner-up	HR	Ref
1937	Willard Brown^{†}	10	Kansas City Monarchs	Turkey Stearnes^{†}, David Whatley	5	
1938	Willard Brown^{†}	7	Kansas City Monarchs	Donald Reeves	5	
1939	Turkey Stearnes^{†}	7	Kansas City Monarchs	Willard Brown^{†}, Bill Simms, Ted Strong	3	
1940	Turkey Stearnes^{†}	5	Kansas City Monarchs	Donald Reeves, Neil Robinson	4	
1941	Willard Brown,^{†} Ted Strong	6	Kansas City Monarchs	Paul Hardy, Lester Lockett, Willie Hudson, Red Longley, Bradford Bennett, Frank McAllister, John Lyles, Willie Nixon, Ted Radcliffe	1	
1942	Ted Strong	6	Kansas City Monarchs	Neil Robinson, Willard Brown^{†}, Joe Greene	4	
1943	Willard Brown^{†}	7	Kansas City Monarchs	Bill Charter, Neil Robinson, Art Pennington, Goose Tatum, Piper Davis	2	
1944	Barney Serrell	4	Kansas City Monarchs	Ed Steele	3	
1945	Jackie Robinson^{†}, Neil Robinson	4	Kansas City Monarchs, Memphis Red Sox	Casey Jones	3	
1946	Willard Brown^{†}, Ted Strong	3	Kansas City Monarchs	Clyde Nelson, Sam Hairston, Joe Greene	2	
1947	Hank Thompson	8	Kansas City Monarchs	Willard Brown^{†}	6	
1948	Willard Brown^{†}	7	Kansas City Monarchs	Hank Thompson	5	

== See also ==
- Babe Ruth Home Run Award (discontinued) – awarded to the MLB home-run leader
- Josh Gibson Legacy Award – awarded to the AL and NL home-run leaders
- Mel Ott Award – awarded to the NL home-run leader
- 61* - film depicting Maris' record setting 61 home runs in 1961

== Footnotes ==
- ^{L} Recognized "major leagues" include the American and National Leagues and several defunct leagues – the American Association, the Federal League, the Players' League, and the Union Association.
