= List of Major League Baseball annual doubles leaders =

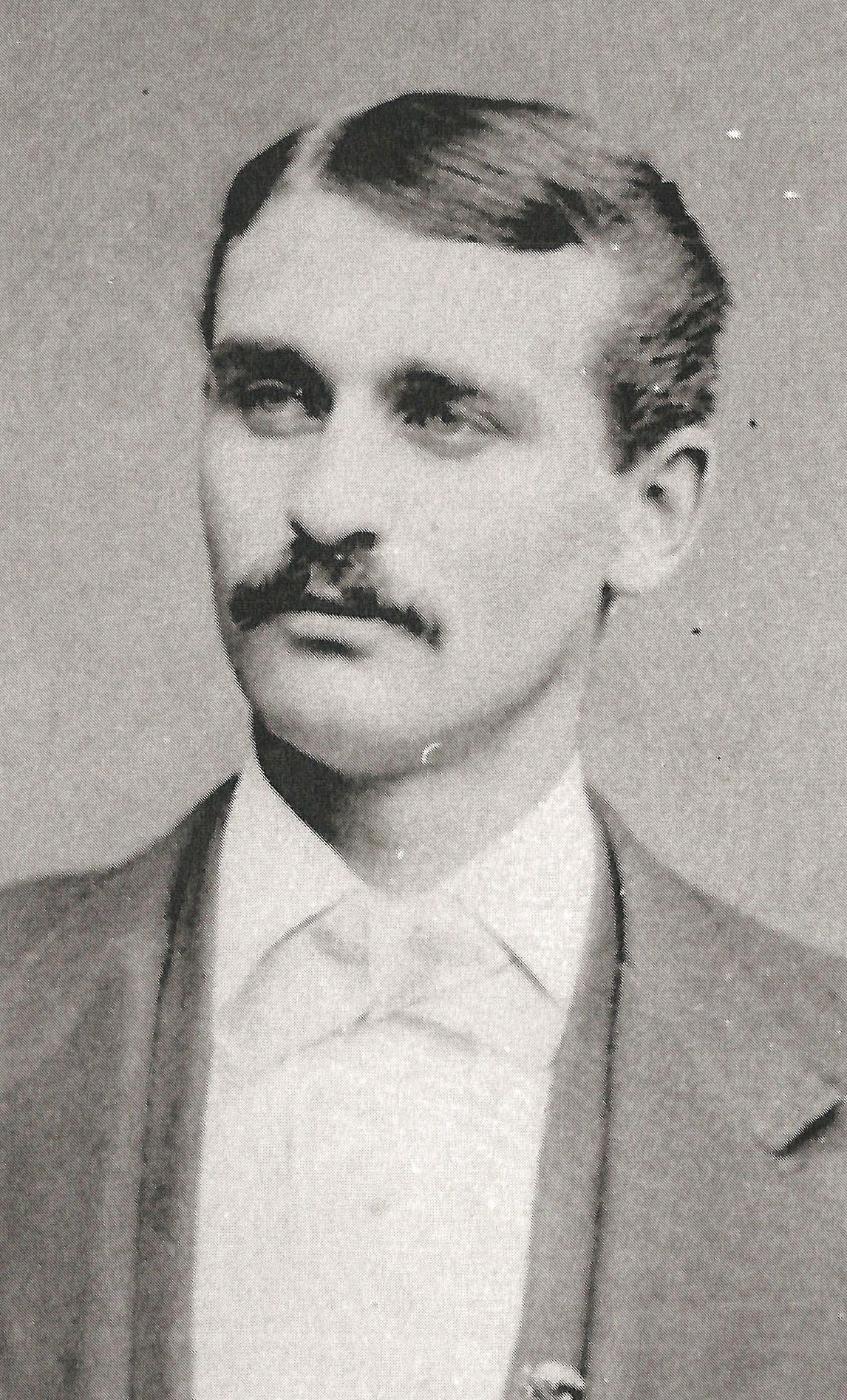
Ross Barnes was one of three players to lead the National League in doubles in its inaugural year of 1876, doing so with 21. He had also led the National Association twice during its inception, thereby making him the first player to lead two different leagues in doubles

In baseball, a double is recorded when the ball is hit so that the batter is able to advance to second base without an error by a defensive player. In Major League Baseball (MLB), the leader in each league (American League and National League) are recognized for their achievement.

The most doubles hit in one season is 67, as done by Earl Webb in 1931. Two players share the record for most times leading a league in doubles - Tris Speaker (AL) and Stan Musial (NL) each led their leagues eight times.

== American League ==
Year	Player	Team(s)	Doubles	Ref
1901	Nap Lajoie	Philadelphia Athletics	48	
1902	Harry Davis; Ed Delahanty	Philadelphia Athletics; Washington Senators	43	
1903	Socks Seybold	Philadelphia Athletics	45	
1904	Nap Lajoie	Cleveland Naps	47	
1905	Harry Davis	Philadelphia Athletics	47	
1906	Nap Lajoie	Cleveland Naps	48	
1907	Harry Davis	Philadelphia Athletics	35	
1908	Ty Cobb	Detroit Tigers	36	
1909	Sam Crawford	Detroit Tigers	35	
1910	Nap Lajoie	Cleveland Naps	51	
1911	Ty Cobb	Detroit Tigers	47	
1912	Tris Speaker	Boston Red Sox	53	
1913	Joe Jackson	Cleveland Naps	39	
1914	Tris Speaker	Boston Red Sox	46	
1915	Bobby Veach	Detroit Tigers	40	
1916	Jack Graney; Tris Speaker	Cleveland Indians	41	
1917	Ty Cobb	Detroit Tigers	44	
1918	Tris Speaker	Cleveland Indians	33	
1919	Bobby Veach	Detroit Tigers	45	
1920	Tris Speaker	Cleveland Indians	50	
1921	Tris Speaker	Cleveland Indians	52	
1922	Tris Speaker	Cleveland Indians	48	
1923	Tris Speaker	Cleveland Indians	59	
1924	Harry Heilmann; Joe Sewell	Detroit Tigers; Cleveland Indians	45	
1925	Marty McManus	St. Louis Browns	33	
1926	George Burns	Cleveland Indians	64	
1927	Lou Gehrig	New York Yankees	52	
1928	Lou Gehrig; Heinie Manush	New York Yankees; St. Louis Browns	47	
1929	Charlie Gehringer; Roy Johnson; Heinie Manush	Detroit Tigers; Detroit Tigers; St. Louis Browns	45	
1930	Johnny Hodapp	Cleveland Indians	49	
1931	Earl Webb	Boston Red Sox	67 (Note: American League single-season record.)	
1932	Eric McNair	Philadelphia Athletics	47	
1933	Joe Cronin	Washington Senators	45	
1934	Hank Greenberg	Detroit Tigers	63	
1935	Joe Vosmik	Cleveland Indians	47	
1936	Charlie Gehringer	Detroit Tigers	60	
1937	Beau Bell	St. Louis Browns	51	
1938	Joe Cronin	Boston Red Sox	51	
1939	Red Rolfe	New York Yankees	46	
1940	Hank Greenberg	Detroit Tigers	50	
1941	Lou Boudreau	Cleveland Indians	45	
1942	Don Kolloway	Chicago White Sox	40	
1943	Dick Wakefield	Detroit Tigers	38	
1944	Lou Boudreau	Cleveland Indians	45	
1945	Wally Moses	Chicago White Sox	35	
1946	Mickey Vernon	Washington Senators	44	
1947	Lou Boudreau	Cleveland Indians	45	
1948	Ted Williams	Boston Red Sox	44	
1949	Ted Williams	Boston Red Sox	39	
1950	George Kell	Detroit Tigers	56	
1951	George Kell; Sam Mele; Eddie Yost	Detroit Tigers; Washington Senators; Washington Senators	36	
1952	Ferris Fain	Philadelphia Athletics	43	
1953	Mickey Vernon	Washington Senators	43	
1954	Mickey Vernon	Washington Senators	33	
1955	Harvey Kuenn	Detroit Tigers	38	
1956	Jimmy Piersall	Boston Red Sox	40	
1957	Billy Gardner; Minnie Miñoso	Baltimore Orioles; Chicago White Sox	36	
1958	Harvey Kuenn	Detroit Tigers	39	
1959	Harvey Kuenn	Detroit Tigers	42	
1960	Tito Francona	Cleveland Indians	36	
1961	Al Kaline	Detroit Tigers	41	
1962	Floyd Robinson	Chicago White Sox	45	
1963	Carl Yastrzemski	Boston Red Sox	40	
1964	Tony Oliva	Minnesota Twins	43	
1965	Zoilo Versalles; Carl Yastrzemski	Minnesota Twins; Boston Red Sox	45	
1966	Carl Yastrzemski	Boston Red Sox	39	
1967	Tony Oliva	Minnesota Twins	34	
1968	Reggie Smith	Boston Red Sox	37	
1969	Tony Oliva	Minnesota Twins	39	
1970	Tony Oliva; Amos Otis; César Tovar	Minnesota Twins; Kansas City Royals; Minnesota Twins	36	
1971	Reggie Smith	Boston Red Sox	33	
1972	Lou Piniella	Kansas City Royals	33	
1973	Sal Bando; Pedro Garcia	Oakland Athletics; Milwaukee Brewers	32	
1974	Joe Rudi	Oakland Athletics	39	
1975	Fred Lynn	Boston Red Sox	47	
1976	Amos Otis	Kansas City Royals	40	
1977	Hal McRae	Kansas City Royals	54	
1978	George Brett	Kansas City Royals	45	
1979	Cecil Cooper; Chet Lemon	Milwaukee Brewers; Chicago White Sox	44	
1980	Robin Yount	Milwaukee Brewers	49	
1981	Cecil Cooper	Milwaukee Brewers	35	
1982	Hal McRae; Robin Yount	Kansas City Royals; Milwaukee Brewers	46	
1983	Cal Ripken Jr.	Baltimore Orioles	47	
1984	Don Mattingly	New York Yankees	44	
1985	Don Mattingly	New York Yankees	48	
1986	Don Mattingly	New York Yankees	53	
1987	Paul Molitor	Milwaukee Brewers	41	
1988	Wade Boggs	Boston Red Sox	45	
1989	Wade Boggs	Boston Red Sox	51	
1990	George Brett; Jody Reed	Kansas City Royals; Boston Red Sox	45	
1991	Rafael Palmeiro	Texas Rangers	49	
1992	Edgar Martínez; Frank Thomas	Seattle Mariners; Chicago White Sox	46	
1993	John Olerud	Toronto Blue Jays	54	
1994	Chuck Knoblauch	Minnesota Twins	45	
1995	Albert Belle; Edgar Martínez	Cleveland Indians; Seattle Mariners	52	
1996	Alex Rodriguez	Seattle Mariners	54	
1997	John Valentin	Boston Red Sox	47	
1998	Juan González	Texas Rangers	50	
1999	Shawn Green	Toronto Blue Jays	45	
2000	Carlos Delgado	Toronto Blue Jays	57	
2001	Jason Giambi	Oakland Athletics	47	
2002	Garret Anderson; Nomar Garciaparra	Anaheim Angels; Boston Red Sox	56	
2003	Garret Anderson; Vernon Wells	Anaheim Angels; Toronto Blue Jays	49	
2004	Brian Roberts	Baltimore Orioles	50	
2005	Miguel Tejada	Baltimore Orioles	50	
2006	Grady Sizemore	Cleveland Indians	53	
2007	Magglio Ordóñez	Detroit Tigers	54	
2008	Dustin Pedroia	Boston Red Sox	54	
2009	Brian Roberts	Baltimore Orioles	56	
2010	Adrián Beltré	Boston Red Sox	49	
2011	Miguel Cabrera	Detroit Tigers	48	
2012	Alex Gordon	Kansas City Royals	51	
2013	Manny Machado	Baltimore Orioles	51	
2014	Miguel Cabrera	Detroit Tigers	52	
2015	Michael Brantley	Cleveland Indians	45	
2016	David Ortiz	Boston Red Sox	48	
2017	José Ramírez	Cleveland Indians	56	
2018	Alex Bregman	Houston Astros	51	
2019	Rafael Devers	Boston Red Sox	54	
2020	César Hernández	Cleveland Indians	20	
2021	Jeimer Candelario; J. D. Martinez; Whit Merrifield	Detroit Tigers; Boston Red Sox; Kansas City Royals	42	
2022	José Ramírez	Cleveland Guardians	44	
2023	Corey Seager	Texas Rangers	42	
2024	Jarren Duran	Boston Red Sox	48	
2025	Bobby Witt Jr.	Kansas City Royals	47	
2026	Wilyer Abreu	Boston Red Sox	38	

== National League ==
Year	Player	Team(s)	Doubles	Ref
1876	Ross Barnes, Dick Higham, Paul Hines	Chicago White Stockings, Hartford Dark Blues, Chicago White Stockings	21	
1877	Cap Anson	Chicago White Stockings	19	
1878	Dick Higham	Providence Grays	22	
1879	Charlie Eden	Cleveland Blues	31	
1880	Fred Dunlap	Cleveland Blues	27	
1881	Paul Hines; King Kelly	Providence Grays; Chicago White Stockings	27	
1882	King Kelly	Chicago White Stockings	37	
1883	Ned Williamson	Chicago White Stockings	49	
1884	Paul Hines	Providence Grays	36	
1885	Cap Anson	Chicago White Stockings	35	
1886	Dan Brouthers	Detroit Wolverines	40	
1887	Dan Brouthers	Detroit Wolverines	36	
1888	Dan Brouthers; Jimmy Ryan	Detroit Wolverines; Chicago White Stockings	33	
1889	King Kelly	Boston Beaneaters	41	
1890	Sam Thompson	Philadelphia Phillies	41	
1891	Mike Griffin	Brooklyn Grooms	36	
1892	Roger Connor	Philadelphia Phillies	37	
1893	Sam Thompson	Philadelphia Phillies	37	
1894	Hugh Duffy	Boston Beaneaters	51	
1895	Ed Delahanty	Philadelphia Phillies	49	
1896	Ed Delahanty	Philadelphia Phillies	44	
1897	Jake Stenzel	Baltimore Orioles	43	
1898	Nap Lajoie	Philadelphia Phillies	43	
1899	Ed Delahanty	Philadelphia Phillies	55	
1900	Honus Wagner	Pittsburgh Pirates	45	
1901	Tom Daly; Ed Delahanty	Brooklyn Superbas; Philadelphia Phillies	38	
1902	Honus Wagner	Pittsburgh Pirates	30	
1903	Fred Clarke; Sam Mertes; Harry Steinfeldt	Pittsburgh Pirates; New York Giants; Cincinnati Reds	32	
1904	Honus Wagner	Pittsburgh Pirates	44	
1905	Cy Seymour	Cincinnati Reds	40	
1906	Honus Wagner	Pittsburgh Pirates	38	
1907	Honus Wagner	Pittsburgh Pirates	38	
1908	Honus Wagner	Pittsburgh Pirates	39	
1909	Honus Wagner	Pittsburgh Pirates	39	
1910	Bobby Byrne	Pittsburgh Pirates	43	
1911	Ed Konetchy	St. Louis Cardinals	38	
1912	Heinie Zimmerman	Chicago Cubs	41	
1913	Red Smith	Brooklyn Superbas	40	
1914	Sherry Magee	Philadelphia Phillies	39	
1915	Larry Doyle	New York Giants	40	
1916	Bert Niehoff	Philadelphia Phillies	42	
1917	Heinie Groh	Cincinnati Reds	39	
1918	Heinie Groh	Cincinnati Reds	28	
1919	Ross Youngs	New York Giants	31	
1920	Rogers Hornsby	St. Louis Cardinals	44	
1921	Rogers Hornsby	St. Louis Cardinals	44	
1922	Rogers Hornsby	St. Louis Cardinals	46	
1923	Edd Roush	Cincinnati Reds	41	
1924	Rogers Hornsby	St. Louis Cardinals	43	
1925	Jim Bottomley	St. Louis Cardinals	44	
1926	Jim Bottomley	St. Louis Cardinals	40	
1927	Riggs Stephenson	Chicago Cubs	46	
1928	Paul Waner	Pittsburgh Pirates	50	
1929	Johnny Frederick	Brooklyn Robins	52	
1930	Chuck Klein	Philadelphia Phillies	59	
1931	Sparky Adams	St. Louis Cardinals	46	
1932	Paul Waner	Pittsburgh Pirates	62	
1933	Chuck Klein	Philadelphia Phillies	44	
1934	Ethan Allen; Kiki Cuyler	Philadelphia Phillies; Chicago Cubs	42	
1935	Billy Herman	Chicago Cubs	57	
1936	Joe Medwick	St. Louis Cardinals	64 (Note: National League single-season record.)	
1937	Joe Medwick	St. Louis Cardinals	56	
1938	Joe Medwick	St. Louis Cardinals	47	
1939	Enos Slaughter	St. Louis Cardinals	52	
1940	Frank McCormick	Cincinnati Reds	44	
1941	Johnny Mize; Pete Reiser	St. Louis Cardinals; Brooklyn Dodgers	39	
1942	Marty Marion	St. Louis Cardinals	38	
1943	Stan Musial	St. Louis Cardinals	48	
1944	Stan Musial	St. Louis Cardinals	51	
1945	Tommy Holmes	Boston Braves	47	
1946	Stan Musial	St. Louis Cardinals	50	
1947	Eddie Miller	Cincinnati Reds	38	
1948	Stan Musial	St. Louis Cardinals	46	
1949	Stan Musial	St. Louis Cardinals	41	
1950	Red Schoendienst	St. Louis Cardinals	43	
1951	Alvin Dark	New York Giants	41	
1952	Stan Musial	St. Louis Cardinals	42	
1953	Stan Musial	St. Louis Cardinals	53	
1954	Stan Musial	St. Louis Cardinals	41	
1955	Hank Aaron; Johnny Logan	Milwaukee Braves	37	
1956	Hank Aaron	Milwaukee Braves	34	
1957	Don Hoak	Cincinnati Reds	39	
1958	Orlando Cepeda	San Francisco Giants	38	
1959	Vada Pinson	Cincinnati Reds	47	
1960	Vada Pinson	Cincinnati Reds	37	
1961	Hank Aaron	Milwaukee Braves	39	
1962	Frank Robinson	Cincinnati Reds	51	
1963	Dick Groat	St. Louis Cardinals	43	
1964	Lee Maye	Milwaukee Braves	44	
1965	Hank Aaron	Milwaukee Braves	40	
1966	Johnny Callison	Philadelphia Phillies	40	
1967	Rusty Staub	Houston Astros	44	
1968	Lou Brock	St. Louis Cardinals	46	
1969	Matty Alou	Pittsburgh Pirates	41	
1970	Wes Parker	Los Angeles Dodgers	47	
1971	César Cedeño	Houston Astros	40	
1972	César Cedeño; Willie Montañez	Houston Astros; Philadelphia Phillies	39	
1973	Willie Stargell	Pittsburgh Pirates	43	
1974	Pete Rose	Cincinnati Reds	45	
1975	Pete Rose	Cincinnati Reds	47	
1976	Pete Rose	Cincinnati Reds	42	
1977	Dave Parker	Pittsburgh Pirates	44	
1978	Pete Rose	Cincinnati Reds	51	
1979	Keith Hernandez	St. Louis Cardinals	48	
1980	Pete Rose	Philadelphia Phillies	42	
1981	Bill Buckner	Chicago Cubs	35	
1982	Al Oliver	Montreal Expos	43	
1983	Bill Buckner; Al Oliver; Johnny Ray	Chicago Cubs; Montreal Expos; Pittsburgh Pirates	38	
1984	Tim Raines; Johnny Ray	Montreal Expos; Pittsburgh Pirates	38	
1985	Dave Parker	Cincinnati Reds	42	
1986	Von Hayes	Philadelphia Phillies	46	
1987	Tim Wallach	Montreal Expos	42	
1988	Andrés Galarraga	Montreal Expos	42	
1989	Pedro Guerrero; Tim Wallach	St. Louis Cardinals; Montreal Expos	42	
1990	Gregg Jefferies	New York Mets	40	
1991	Bobby Bonilla	Pittsburgh Pirates	44	
1992	Andy Van Slyke	Pittsburgh Pirates	45	
1993	Charlie Hayes	Colorado Rockies	45	
1994	Craig Biggio; Larry Walker	Houston Astros; Montreal Expos	43	
1995	Mark Grace	Chicago Cubs	51	
1996	Jeff Bagwell	Houston Astros	48	
1997	Mark Grudzielanek	Montreal Expos	54	
1998	Craig Biggio	Houston Astros	51	
1999	Craig Biggio	Houston Astros	56	
2000	Todd Helton	Colorado Rockies	59	
2001	Lance Berkman	Houston Astros	55	
2002	Bobby Abreu	Philadelphia Phillies	50	
2003	Albert Pujols	St. Louis Cardinals	51	
2004	Lyle Overbay	Milwaukee Brewers	53	
2005	Derrek Lee	Chicago Cubs	50	
2006	Freddy Sanchez	Pittsburgh Pirates	53	
2007	Matt Holliday	Colorado Rockies	50	
2008	Lance Berkman; Nate McLouth	Houston Astros; Pittsburgh Pirates	46	
2009	Miguel Tejada	Houston Astros	46	
2010	Jayson Werth	Philadelphia Phillies	46	
2011	Joey Votto	Cincinnati Reds	40	
2012	Aramis Ramírez	Milwaukee Brewers	50	
2013	Matt Carpenter	St. Louis Cardinals	55	
2014	Jonathan Lucroy	Milwaukee Brewers	53	
2015	Matt Carpenter	St. Louis Cardinals	44	
2016	Daniel Murphy	Washington Nationals	47	
2017	Nolan Arenado; Daniel Murphy	Colorado Rockies; Washington Nationals	43	
2018	Freddie Freeman; Anthony Rendon	Atlanta Braves; Washington Nationals	44	
2019	Anthony Rendon; Corey Seager	Washington Nationals; Los Angeles Dodgers	44	
2020	Freddie Freeman	Atlanta Braves	23	
2021	Bryce Harper	Philadelphia Phillies	42	
2022	Freddie Freeman	Los Angeles Dodgers	47	
2023	Freddie Freeman	Los Angeles Dodgers	59	
2024	Ezequiel Tovar	Colorado Rockies	45	
2025	Pete Alonso; Matt Olson	New York Mets; Atlanta Braves	41	
2026	Bryan Reynolds	Pittsburgh Pirates	40	

== Other Major Leagues ==
=== National Association of Professional Base Ball Players ===
(Note: Whether the National Association of Base Ball Players should be considered a Major League is a topic of debate among baseball historians. Officially, it is not considered a Major League by Major League Baseball, but for convenience purposes, it is listed in this article as a Major League.)

Year	Player	Team(s)	Doubles	Ref
1871	Cap Anson	Rockford Forest Citys	11	
1872	Ross Barnes	Boston Red Stockings	28	
1873	Ross Barnes	Boston Red Stockings	31	
1874	Lip Pike	Hartford Dark Blues	22	
1875	Cal McVey	Boston Red Stockings	36 (Note: National Association of Professional Base Ball Players single-season record.)	

=== American Association ===
Year	Player	Team(s)	Doubles	Ref
1882	Mike Mansell, Ed Swartwood	Pittsburgh Alleghenys	18	
1883	Harry Stovey	Philadelphia Athletics	31	
1884	Sam Barkley	Toledo Blue Stockings	39	
1885	Henry Larkin	Philadelphia Athletics	37	
1886	Henry Larkin	Philadelphia Athletics	36	
1887	Tip O'Neill	St. Louis Browns	52 (Note: American Association single-season record.)	
1888	Hub Collins	Louisville Colonels / Brooklyn Bridegrooms	31	
1889	Curt Welch	Philadelphia Athletics	39	
1890	Cupid Childs	Syracuse Stars	33	
1891	Jocko Milligan	Philadelphia Athletics	35	

=== Federal League ===
Year	Player	Team(s)	Doubles	Ref
1914	Benny Kauff	Indianapolis Hoosiers	44 (Note: Federal League single-season record.)	
1915	Steve Evans	Brooklyn Tip-Tops / Baltimore Terrapins	34	

=== Players' League ===
Year	Player	Team(s)	Doubles	Ref
1890	Pete Browning	Cleveland Infants	40	

=== Union Association ===
Year	Player	Team(s)	Doubles	Ref
1884	Orator Shafer	St. Louis Maroons	40	

=== National Association of Professional Base Ball Players ===
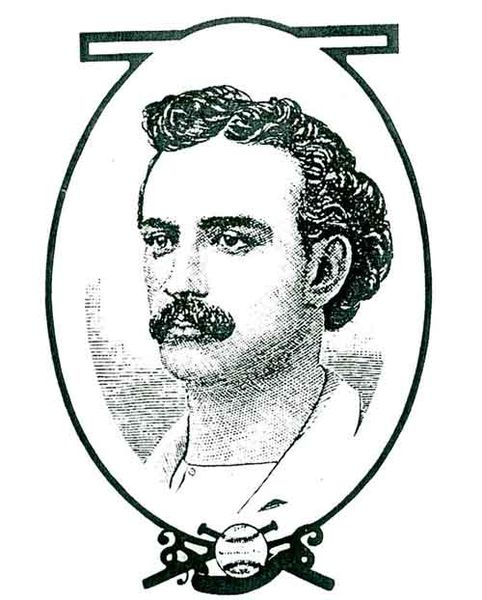
Lip Pike

Year	Player	Team(s)	Doubles	Ref
1871	Cap Anson	Rockford Forest Citys	11	
1872	Ross Barnes	Boston Red Stockings	28	
1873	Ross Barnes	Boston Red Stockings	29	
1874	Lip Pike	Hartford Dark Blues	22	
1875	Cal McVey	Boston Red Stockings	36	

== Negro Major Leagues ==
=== Negro National League I ===
Year	Leader	Doubles	Team	Runner-up	Doubles	Ref
1920	Cristóbal Torriente	21	Chicago American Giants	Oscar Charleston, Ben Taylor, Bartolo Portuondo	20	
1921	Ben Taylor	25	Indianapolis ABCs	Hurley McNair	22	
1922	Ben Taylor	34 (Note: Negro Major League single-season record (tied with Willie Wells in 1930).)	Indianapolis ABCs	Oscar Charleston	25	
1923	Heavy Johnson	32	Kansas City Monarchs	Oscar Charleston	25	
1924	Cristóbal Torriente	27	Chicago American Giants	Mule Suttles, Newt Joseph	21	
1925	Cool Papa Bell	33	St. Louis Stars	Clarence Smith	25	
1926	Turkey Stearnes	33	Detroit Stars	Mule Suttles	28	
1927	Pythias Russ	30	Chicago American Giants	Turkey Stearnes	25	
1928	Willie Wells	28	St. Louis Stars	Dewey Creacy	23	
1929	Mule Suttles	31	Chicago American Giants / St. Louis Stars	Newt Allen	27	
1930	Willie Wells	34 (Note: Negro Major League single-season record (tied with Ben Taylor in 1922).)	St. Louis Stars	George Giles	20	
1931	Willie Wells	12	St. Louis Stars	Mule Suttles	11	

=== Eastern Colored League ===
Year	Leader	Doubles	Team	Runner-up	Doubles	Ref
1923	Clint Thomas	14	Hilldale Club	John Henry Lloyd	13	
1924	Oscar Charleston	22	Harrisburg Giants	Judy Johnson	21	
1925	Clint Thomas	24	Harrisburg Giants	Oscar Charleston	23	
1926	Biz Mackey	25	Hilldale Club	George Carr, Judy Johnson	19	
1927	Oscar Charleston, Martín Dihigo	13	Harrisburg Giants, Cuban Stars (East)	Milton Lewis	11	
1928	Jud Wilson	18	Baltimore Black Sox	Dick Lundy	17	

=== American Negro League ===
Year	Leader	Doubles	Team	Runner-up	Doubles	Ref
1929	Chino Smith	29	New York Lincoln Giants	George Scales, Oscar Charleston	18	

=== East–West League ===
Year	Leader	Doubles	Team	Runner-up	Doubles	Ref
1932	Tom Finley, Mule Suttles	22	Baltimore Black Sox, Detroit Wolves / Washington Pilots	Dick Lundy	15	

=== Negro Southern League ===
Year	Leader	Doubles	Team	Runner-up	Doubles	Ref
1932	Red Parnell, Leroy Morney	12	Monroe Monarchs	Nat Rogers	10	

=== Negro National League II ===
Year	Leader	Doubles	Team	Runner-up	Doubles	Ref
1933	Oscar Charleston	19	Pittsburgh Crawfords	Judy Johnson	17	
1934	Josh Gibson	19	Pittsburgh Crawfords	Judy Johnson	14	
1935	Buck Leonard	18	Homestead Grays	George Giles, Jim Williams	15	
1936	Sam Bankhead	16	Pittsburgh Crawfords	Dave Thomas	12	
1937	Vic Harris	17	Homestead Grays	Jerry Benjamin, Buck Leonard	15	

=== Negro American League ===
Year	Leader	Doubles	Team	Runner-up	Doubles	Ref
1937	Jess Brooks	14	Kansas City Monarchs	Howard Easterling, Ted Strong	12	
1938	Willard Brown	16	Kansas City Monarchs	Babe Davis, Henry Milton	10	
1939	Willard Brown	15	Kansas City Monarchs	Turkey Stearnes	9	
1940	T. J. Brown	11	Memphis Red Sox	Buddy Armour, Red Longley	8	
1941	Willard Brown	7	Kansas City Monarchs	Newt Allen, Ted Strong, Junius Bibbs, Hilton Smith	5	
1942	Sam Jethroe	10	Cincinnati–Cleveland Buckeyes	Parnell Woods, Ted Strong, Neil Robinson	8	
1943	Barney Serrell	14	Kansas City Monarchs	Willard Brown	13	
1944	Barney Serrell	9	Kansas City Monarchs	Artie Wilson, Newt Allen	7	
1945	Jackie Robinson	13	Kansas City Monarchs	Jesse Williams, Lee Moody	10	
1946	Willard Brown	11	Kansas City Monarchs	Sam Hairston	7	
1947	Willard Brown	22	Kansas City Monarchs	Buck O'Neil	14	
1948	Willard Brown	23	Kansas City Monarchs	Hank Thompson	13	
