= Bill Hoskins (baseball) =

American baseball player

- Outfielder
- Born: March 14, 1914; Tallahatchie County, Mississippi, U.S.
- Batted: Left Threw: Right

Negro league baseball debut
- 1937, for the St. Louis Stars

Last appearance
- 1946, for the New York Black Yankees
- Stats at Baseball Reference

Teams
- St. Louis Stars (1937); Chicago American Giants (1937); Detroit Stars (1937); Washington Black Senators (1938); Baltimore Elite Giants (1938–1946); Kansas City Monarchs (1943); New York Black Yankees (1946)

Career highlights and awards
- Negro National League champion (1939); All-Star (1941); Negro National League home run leader (1940) (Note: Tied with Henry McHenry, Buck Leonard and Lennie Pearson.)

William Charles Hoskins (March 14, 1914 – death date unknown), nicknamed "Big Bill", was an American Negro league baseball outfielder in the 1930s and 1940s, spending the majority of his career with the Baltimore Elite Giants.

A native of Tallahatchie County, Mississippi, Hoskins broke into the Negro leagues in 1937, splitting time between the St. Louis Stars, Chicago American Giants, and Detroit Stars. He joined the Baltimore Elite Giants in 1938, and continued to play for Baltimore through 1946. He has the highest postseason batting average in Major League Baseball history, (Note: Minimum 40 career postseason plate appearances.) having batted .487 (19-for-39) in twelve postseason games played (1937, 1939). Hoskins was selected to play in the 1941 East–West All-Star Game, and went 1-for-5 in the contest.
