= Henry McHenry (baseball) =

American baseball player (1910–1981)

- Pitcher / Outfielder
- Born: April 3, 1910; Houston, Texas, U.S.
- Died: February 9, 1981 (aged 70); Brooklyn, New York, U.S.
- Batted: Right Threw: Right

Negro league baseball debut
- 1930, for the Kansas City Monarchs

Last appearance
- 1948, for the Philadelphia Stars

Teams
- Kansas City Monarchs (1930–1931); New York Black Yankees (1931, 1933, 1935–1936); Kansas City Monarchs (1937); Philadelphia Stars (1938–1942, 1946–1948)

Career highlights and awards
- Negro National League wins leader (1939); Negro National League strikeout leader (1940); Negro National League home run leader (1940) (Note: Tied with Bill Hoskins, Buck Leonard and Lennie Pearson.)

Henry Lloyd McHenry (April 3, 1910 - February 9, 1981) was an American professional baseball pitcher and outfielder in Negro league baseball from 1930 to 1951.

== Career ==
He was nicknamed "El Chato" ("Cream"). During his career he played for the Kansas City Monarchs, New York Harlem Stars, Newark Browns, Pennsylvania Red Caps of New York, New York Black Yankees, Philadelphia Stars and Indianapolis Clowns. He also played baseball in Cuba, Puerto Rico, Mexico, and other countries in Central and South America. He was born in Houston, Texas.

In the Mexican League he played for Carta Blanca from 1940 to 1941, Diablos Rojos del México from 1942 to 1943, spending the remainder of the 1943 season with the Alijadores de Tampico. In 1944 he played for Tampico and Azules de Veracruz and in 1945 he returned to Tampico. In 1946 he played for the Tuneros de San Luis Potosí, in 1949 for the Charros de Jalisco, and in 1950 again for the Azules.

Charlie Biot called him a "damn good pitcher" in the book The Negro Leagues Revisited: Conversations with 66 More Baseball Heroes by Brent P. Kelley. Tom Johnson recalled in I Will Never Forget: Interviews with 39 Former Negro League Players, also by Brent P. Kelley, that Henry McHenry "was one of [the Philadelphia Stars'] stellar righthanded pitchers."

He pitched for the Minot Mallards of the ManDak League in 1951, until he was released on June 25 (record 0-1).

Henry McHenry died in Brooklyn, New York as a result of pneumonia following surgery. He is survived by his wife Guillermina, his daughters Deanna and Lydia, and two grandchildren who all live in the Atlanta, Georgia area. He is buried in Greenwood Cemetery in Brooklyn.

== Other sources ==
- Treto Cisneros, Pedro (2002). The Mexican League/La Liga Mexicana: Comprehensive Player Statistics, 1937-2001. McFarland & Company. ISBN 978-0-78-641378-2
