= Buck Freeman =

American baseball player (1871–1949)

- Right fielder
- Born: October 30, 1871; Catasauqua, Pennsylvania, U.S.
- Died: June 25, 1949 (aged 77); Wilkes-Barre, Pennsylvania, U.S.
- Batted: Left Threw: Left

MLB debut
- June 27, 1891, for the Washington Statesmen

Last MLB appearance
- April 20, 1907, for the Boston Americans

MLB statistics
- Batting average: .293
- Home runs: 82
- Runs batted in: 713
- Stats at Baseball Reference

Teams
- Washington Statesmen / Senators (1891, 1898–1899); Boston Beaneaters (1900); Boston Americans (1901–1907)

Career highlights and awards
- World Series champion (1903); 2× Home run leader (1899, 1903); 2× AL RBI leader (1902, 1903); Boston Red Sox Hall of Fame

John Frank "Buck" Freeman (October 30, 1871 – June 25, 1949) was an American right fielder in Major League Baseball at the turn of the 20th century. Listed at 5 ft 9 in (1.75 m) and 169 lb (77 kg), he both batted and threw left-handed. Freeman was one of the top sluggers of his era, his most famous feat being the 25 home runs he hit during the 1899 season.

== Career ==
A native of Catasauqua, Pennsylvania, Freeman showed talent as a pitcher from a young age; he later received advice from early African-American player Bud Fowler to practice hitting more.

=== Washington Statesmen ===
Freeman made his major league debut as a left-handed starting pitcher with the Washington Statesmen of the major league American Association on June 27, 1891, registering the loss in a 4–5 defeat to the Philadelphia Athletics. Freeman played in a further four games during the season, finishing up with a 3–2 record and an earned run average of 3.89 in 44 innings pitched, while striking out 28 but also walking 33.

=== Minor leagues ===
Following the 1891 season's conclusion, Freeman did not play in the majors again for seven years. From 1892 through 1898, he played in the Pennsylvania State League, Eastern League, New England League, and Western League. His longest stint was in the Eastern League with Toronto from 1896 to 1898.

=== Washington Senators ===
Freeman returned to the Washington roster in September of the 1898 season, when Arthur Irwin took over as manager; the team was now known as the Senators and played in the National League. Since Freeman's time as a pitcher with the Statesmen, he had bulked out and had begun to show real skill with the bat (in his 18 at bats in 1891 he had recorded a batting average of .222). In light of this, the Senators decided to retrain Freeman as a right fielder, believing that he would be even more useful with the bat than he was with the ball. Albeit with only 107 at bats in 29 games, he recorded a .364 batting average and a .523 slugging percentage during the final weeks of the 1898 Senators season. Following his strong showing with the bat, he was named as the Senators' first-choice right fielder for the following season.

The 25 home runs that Freeman recorded for the 1899 Senators were truly remarkable by the standards of the time; the second highest total that year was 12 by Bobby Wallace of St. Louis. Although Freeman failed to equal Ned Williamson's record of 27 home runs in a season, recorded in 1884 with Chicago, Freeman's total is generally regarded as the greater achievement. Williamson's home field of Lakeshore Park was less than 200 feet (61 m) down the foul lines and 300 feet (91 m) to center, and prior to 1884 balls hit over the fence at Lakeshore Park had been ground rule doubles; of Williamson's 27 homers, only two were hit away from home. Freeman's tally was not surpassed until 1919, when Babe Ruth hit 29 home runs with the Boston Red Sox.

Freeman's contract was sold to Boston in February 1900, as Washington owner J. Earl Wagner correctly foresaw that the National League would be reduced in size. The Senators were one of the teams disbanded as the league contracted from twelve teams to eight.

=== Boston Beaneaters ===
Freeman spent the 1900 season with the Boston Beaneaters (later known as the Boston Braves), where he did not get along with manager Frank Selee. Freeman's offensive numbers for the season were well down from the year before, as he recorded six home runs and 65 runs batted in during 117 games played. On September 1, during a game between Boston and the New York Giants, assigned umpire Ed Smartwood had to leave the game due to injury; the final four innings were completed with Freeman umpiring at home and Bill Carrick of the Giants umpiring at first.

=== Boston Americans ===
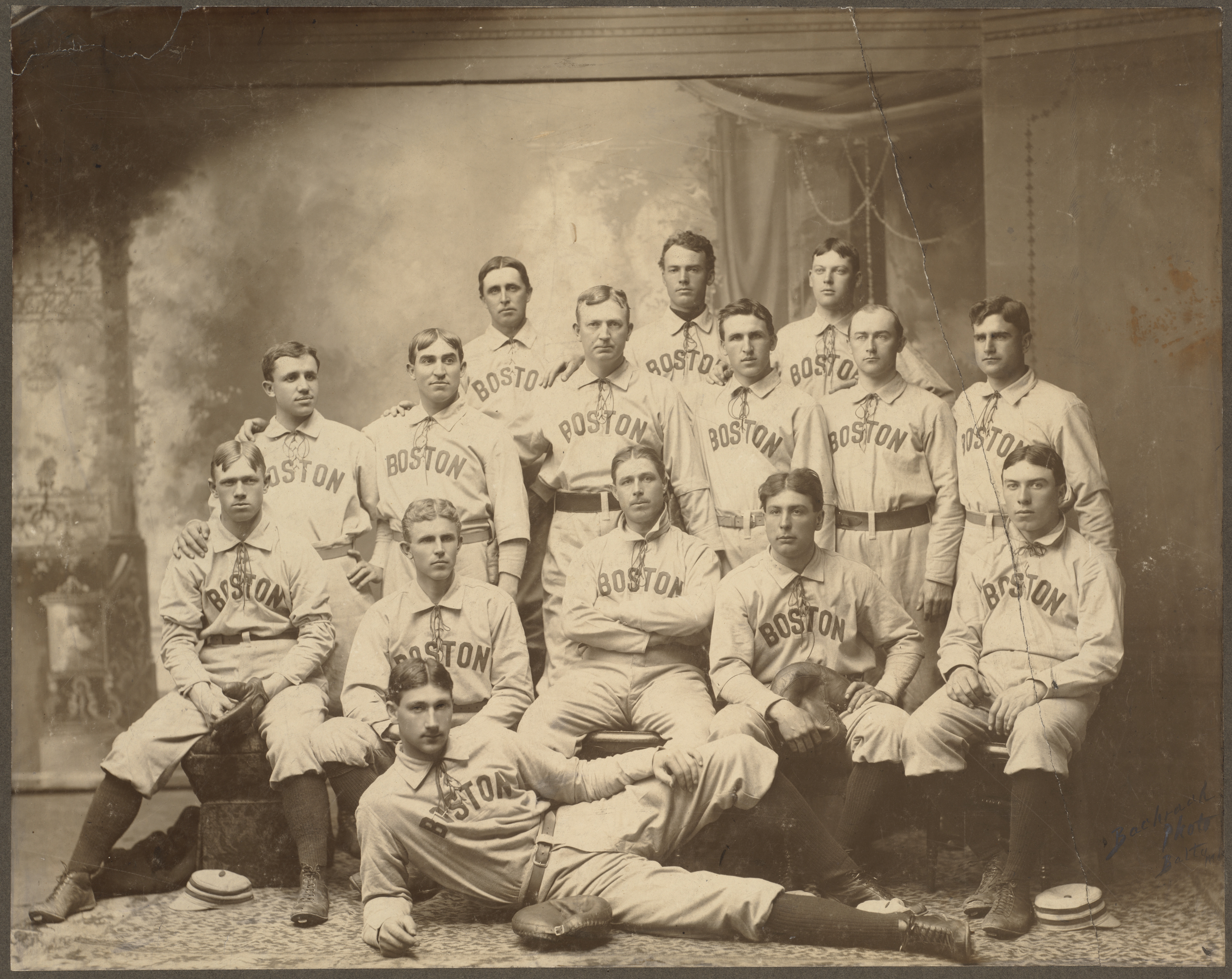
Team picture of the 1901 Boston Americans; Freeman is at center of the back row

For the 1901 season, Freeman and teammate Jimmy Collins moved across town to the Boston Americans (later known as the Boston Red Sox), for the inaugural season of the American League. The Americans decided to convert Freeman into a first baseman. The 1901 season was something of a return to form; he finished second overall in home runs (12), runs batted in (114), and slugging percentage (.520), finishing behind Nap Lajoie in all categories.

In 1902, Freeman returned to playing as a right fielder, which was his better position, and led the American League with 121 runs batted in. In 1903, he helped Boston to the inaugural World Series by leading the league in both home runs (13) and runs batted in (104); by doing so, Freeman became the first player to have led both the National League and the American League in home runs. On June 21, 1903, he hit for the cycle, the first Americans/Red Sox player to do so. The 1903 World Series was the only postseason series that Freeman ever played in, and it proved to be lackluster by his own standards—he recorded an average of .281 (9-for-32) with three triples and four runs batted in over the course of eight games, as Boston defeated the Pittsburgh Pirates.

In the three years following the championship, Freeman's offense declined sharply. In 1906, he managed a .250 average with one home run and 30 runs batted in. After that, he decided to play in Boston for one further season, but after only four games of the 1907 season when he batted 2-for-12 including a home run, Freeman was sent to the Washington Nationals. However, before playing for Washington, his contract was sold into the minor leagues, effectively ending his major league career.

=== Late career ===
Freeman went on to finish the 1907 season with the Minneapolis Millers of the American Association, recording an average of .335 and hitting 18 home runs in 142 games played. Following this successful season, he decided to spend a further season with the Millers; in 1908 he played 92 games with 10 home runs albeit with an average of .218. Freeman then closed his professional career by playing in the New York State League in 1909, the Tri-State League in 1910, and a final 15 games in the New York State League in 1912 at age 40 when he managed the Scranton Miners.

== Legacy ==
In an 11-season major league career, Freeman was a .293 hitter (1,235-for-4,208) with 82 home runs and 713 runs batted in during 1,126 games, including 199 doubles, 131 triples, 92 stolen bases, a slugging percentage of .462, and a .346 on-base percentage. Freeman died at the age of 77 in Wilkes-Barre, Pennsylvania. In May 2018, Freeman was inducted to the Boston Red Sox Hall of Fame.

== See also ==
- List of Major League Baseball career triples leaders
- List of Major League Baseball annual runs batted in leaders
- List of Major League Baseball annual home run leaders
- List of Major League Baseball annual triples leaders
- List of Major League Baseball players to hit for the cycle

Achievements
Preceded by Fred Clarke	Hitting for the cycle June 21, 1903	Succeeded by Patsy Dougherty
