= Johnny Frederick =

American baseball player (1902-1977)

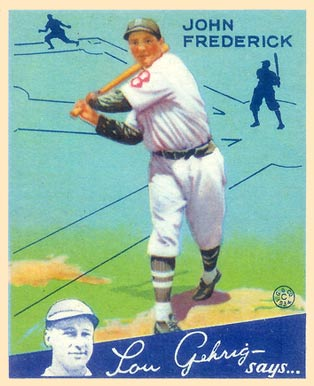
- Outfielder
- Born: January 26, 1902; Denver, Colorado, U.S.
- Died: June 18, 1977 (aged 75); Tigard, Oregon, U.S.
- Batted: Left Threw: Left

MLB debut
- April 18, 1929, for the Brooklyn Robins

Last MLB appearance
- September 25, 1934, for the Brooklyn Dodgers

MLB statistics
- Batting average: .308
- Home runs: 85
- Runs batted in: 377
- Stats at Baseball Reference

Teams
- Brooklyn Robins / Dodgers (1929–1934)

John Henry Frederick (January 26, 1902 – June 18, 1977) was an American Major League Baseball outfielder. He played six seasons for the Brooklyn Dodgers, compiling a .308 batting average (954-for-3102) with 85 home runs and 377 RBI for his career.

== Baseball career ==
Frederick moved to Portland, Oregon at 7 years old and started playing semi-professional baseball in 1920 for a team sponsored by a local hardware interest.

Frederick began his professional baseball career in 1921 and broke into the majors in 1929. His rookie season, he batted .328 with 206 hits while leading the team with 24 home runs and 127 runs scored. He led the major leagues with 52 doubles, the highest total of the century to that point and a Dodgers team record that stood until 2023. That year he also set a Dodgers rookie record for most leadoff home runs in season with three, a record that was not matched until Joc Pederson matched it in May 2015. Frederick recorded 206 hits in both 1929 and 1930, his first two years in the majors. He had four 5-hit games in his six-year major league career. He also led off a game with a home run 10 times with the Dodgers, second in franchise history.

In 1932, Frederick blasted six pinch-hit home runs, setting a major league record that stood for 68 years.

At the time of his retirement in 1934, Frederick held the record for most career home runs by a player born in Colorado (85). He held the mark for eighty years until Chase Headley broke it in 2014.

Frederick was an effective pinch hitter in his MLB career, batting .300 (21-for-70) with 8 home runs and 25 RBI.

=== Post-major leagues ===
Before the 1935 season, the Dodgers traded Frederick to Sacramento of the Pacific Coast League, where he hit a career-high .363. In 2005, he was elected to the Pacific Coast League Hall of Fame.

Frederick was the manager for the Portland Beavers in 1940.

== See also ==
- List of Major League Baseball annual doubles leaders
