= Harry Davis (1900s first baseman) =

American baseball player (1873–1947)

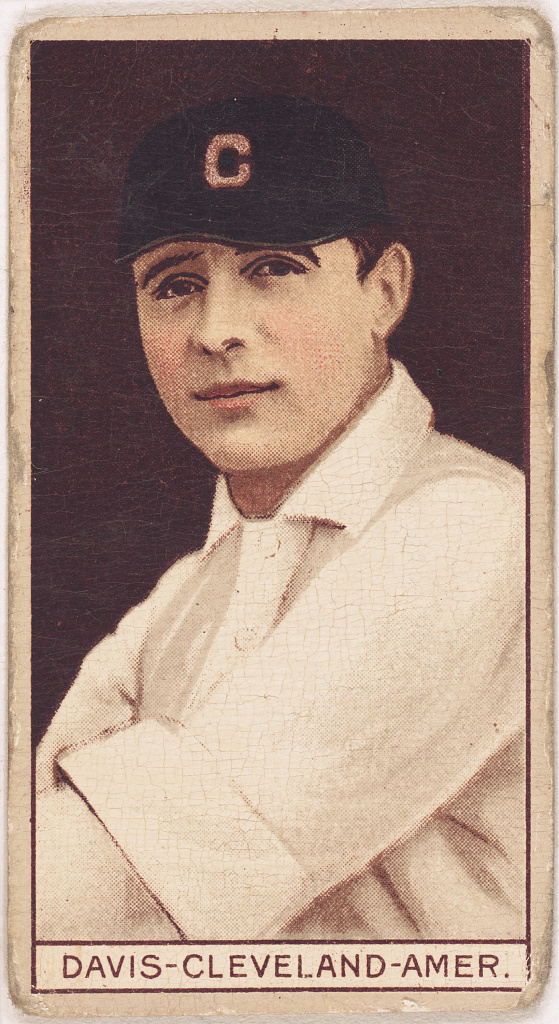
- First baseman / Manager
- Born: July 19, 1873; Philadelphia, Pennsylvania, U.S.
- Died: August 11, 1947 (aged 74); Philadelphia, Pennsylvania, U.S.
- Batted: Right Threw: Right

MLB debut
- September 21, 1895, for the New York Giants

Last MLB appearance
- May 30, 1917, for the Philadelphia Athletics

MLB statistics
- Batting average: .277
- Home runs: 75
- Runs batted in: 951
- Managerial record: 54–71
- Winning %: .432
- Stats at Baseball Reference
- Managerial record at Baseball Reference

Teams
- As player: New York Giants (1895–1896); Pittsburgh Pirates (1896–1898); Louisville Colonels (1898); Washington Senators (1898–1899); Philadelphia Athletics (1901–1911); Cleveland Naps (1912); Philadelphia Athletics (1913–1917); As manager: Cleveland Naps (1912)

Career highlights and awards
- 3× World Series champion (1910, 1911, 1913); 4× AL home run leader (1904–1907); 2× AL RBI leader (1905, 1906)

Harry H. Davis (July 19, 1873 – August 11, 1947) was an American Major League Baseball first baseman who played for the New York Giants (1895–96), Pittsburgh Pirates (1896–98), Louisville Colonels (1898), Washington Senators (1898–99), Philadelphia Athletics (1901–11, 1913–17), and Cleveland Naps (1912). He was the first player to hit for the cycle in American League history, doing so in 1901.

== Early life ==
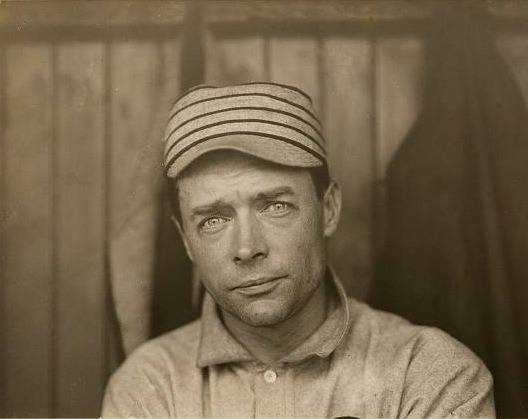
Davis with the Athletics, circa 1911

Davis was born in Philadelphia. He had no middle name, but he added the middle initial H to distinguish himself from others who shared his first and last names. He attended Girard College; the institution served as an elementary school and high school. Davis, who picked up the lifelong nickname of "Jasper" at Girard, graduated in 1891 and played amateur baseball until beginning his professional baseball career in 1894.

== Career ==
After having played the 1900 season for the minor league Providence Grays, he decided to quit baseball, but Athletics manager Connie Mack made him an offer too large to refuse to return to baseball in 1901 with the Athletics. He led the American League in home runs from 1904 to 1907, one of only five players to have ever led their league for four consecutive seasons. He also hit for the cycle on July 10, 1901. He led the AL in doubles three times and the NL in triples once.

Davis was the starting first baseman and first captain of manager Connie Mack's Philadelphia Athletics from 1901 to 1910. In 1905 he led the American league in home runs, RBI, runs and doubles, and led the Athletics to the 1905 World Series against the New York Giants. He was the starting first baseman for the 1910 World Champions and hit .353 in the 1910 World Series. In 1911, the 37-year-old Davis was replaced at first base by the younger Stuffy McInnis, and Davis played a reserve role for the 1911 World Champions.

Davis managed the 1912 Cleveland Naps, but left with 28 games left in the season and a record of 54–71. He returned to the Athletics as a player, coach and assistant captain in 1913, amassing only 33 plate appearances over the next five seasons combined.

In 1755 games over 22 seasons, Davis posted a .277 batting average (1841-for-6653) with 1001 runs, 361 doubles, 145 triples, 75 home runs, 951 RBI, 285 stolen bases, 525 bases on balls, .335 on-base percentage and .408 slugging percentage. He finished his career with an overall .978 fielding percentage primarily as a first baseman. In 16 World Series games (1905,'10,'11) he batted .246 (15-for-61) with 8 runs, 5 doubles, 7 RBI and 3 walks.

== Later life ==
He continued as a coach and scout with Mack's Athletics until 1927 and also served as a Philadelphia City Councilman.

Davis died in Philadelphia, Pennsylvania, August 11, 1947, at the age of 74.

== See also ==
- List of Major League Baseball career triples leaders
- List of Major League Baseball career runs scored leaders
- List of Major League Baseball career stolen bases leaders
- List of Major League Baseball players to hit for the cycle
- List of Major League Baseball annual runs batted in leaders
- List of Major League Baseball home run records
- List of Major League Baseball annual home run leaders
- List of Major League Baseball annual runs scored leaders
- List of Major League Baseball annual doubles leaders
- List of Major League Baseball annual triples leaders
- List of Major League Baseball player-managers
- Major League Baseball titles leaders

Achievements
Preceded by Bill Joyce	Hitting for the cycle July 10, 1901	Succeeded by Fred Clarke
