= Johnny Mize =

American baseball player (1913–1993)

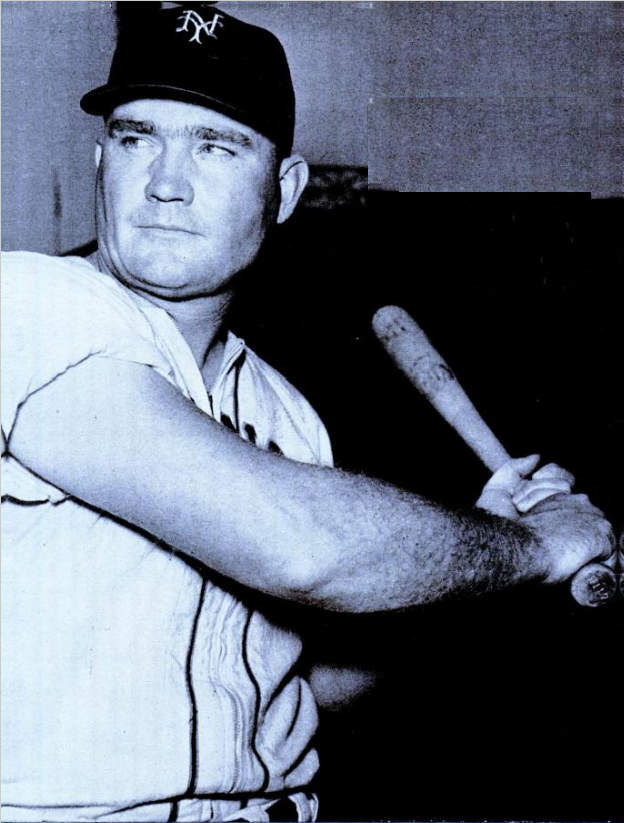
- Mize with the New York Giants in 1948
- First baseman
- Born: January 7, 1913; Demorest, Georgia, U.S.
- Died: June 2, 1993 (aged 80); Demorest, Georgia, U.S.
- Batted: Left Threw: Right

MLB debut
- April 16, 1936, for the St. Louis Cardinals

Last MLB appearance
- September 26, 1953, for the New York Yankees

MLB statistics
- Batting average: .312
- Hits: 2,011
- Home runs: 359
- Runs batted in: 1,337
- Stats at Baseball Reference

Teams
- St. Louis Cardinals (1936–1941); New York Giants (1942, 1946–1949); New York Yankees (1949–1953)

Career highlights and awards
- 10× All-Star (1937, 1939–1942, 1946–1949, 1953); 5× World Series champion (1949–1953); NL batting champion (1939); 4× NL home run leader (1939, 1940, 1947, 1948); 3× NL RBI leader (1940, 1942, 1947); St. Louis Cardinals Hall of Fame

Member of the National

Baseball Hall of Fame
- Induction: 1981
- Election method: Veterans Committee

John Robert Mize (January 7, 1913 – June 2, 1993), nicknamed "Big Jawn" and "the Big Cat", was an American professional baseball first baseman. He played 15 seasons in Major League Baseball (MLB) for the St. Louis Cardinals, New York Giants, and New York Yankees from 1936 to 1953, losing three seasons to military service during World War II. Mize was a ten-time All-Star and won five consecutive World Series with the Yankees.

Mize retired in 1953 with 359 career home runs and a .312 batting average along with 1,118 runs, 2,011 hits, 367 doubles, 83 triples, 1,337 RBI and 856 bases on balls. Defensively, he recorded a .992 fielding percentage as a first baseman. He served as a radio commentator, scout and coach in the major leagues after he retired as a player. He was selected for induction to the Baseball Hall of Fame by the Veterans Committee in 1981. In 2014, he was inducted into the St. Louis Cardinals Hall of Fame.

== Early life and career ==
Mize was born in Demorest, Georgia to Edward and Emma Loudermilk Mize. After his parents separated, his mother went to Atlanta for work, but Mize remained in Demorest with his grandmother. He excelled in tennis as a child and played on his high school baseball team. He later played baseball for Piedmont College. Mize was a cousin of Ty Cobb and his second cousin was the second wife of Babe Ruth.

Mize came up through the St. Louis Cardinals minor league system but was traded to the Cincinnati Reds in 1934. However, he suffered a groin injury and the Reds nullified the trade. In 1935, while struggling with one bad leg, he injured the other leg. Mize retired from baseball and returned home until the Cardinals asked him to see a physician in St. Louis. He had surgery for bone spurs.

He was kept with the Cardinals in St. Louis after surgery, as he would not have been able to play regularly that season in the minor leagues anyway. The organization thought that he might get some opportunities to pinch hit with the major league team. Mize made his major league debut for the Cardinals in 1936. In 126 games, Mize hit for a .329 batting average, 19 home runs and 93 runs batted in (RBI). He later said, "I'm the only guy who played in the major leagues because I couldn't play in the minors."

== Early MLB career ==
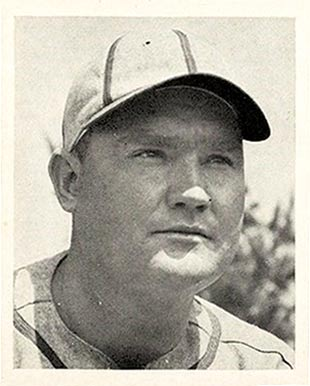
Mize with the Cardinals

Mize was known as both "Big Jawn" and "The Big Cat" for his smooth fielding at first base. In 1937 he batted .364, but Cardinals teammate Joe Medwick took the title with a .374 average. He led the league in triples and OPS in 1938. In 1939, Mize finished second in the league's Most Valuable Player (MVP) voting after leading the league with a .349 average and 28 home runs. Mize's 43 home runs in 1940 set a Cardinals team record that stood for nearly 60 years. At the end of the 1941 season, however, Cardinals general manager Branch Rickey, who believed in trading players before their skills began to decline, traded Mize to the New York Giants. In exchange for Mize, the Cardinals received Bill Lohrman, Johnny McCarthy, Ken O'Dea, and $50,000.

Mize was involved in a 1941 lawsuit against Gum Products Inc. The company manufactured a set of baseball cards called Double Play. Mize sued because he argued that the company did not have his consent to use his image in the card set. Gum Products Inc. won the lawsuit, but the company stopped producing its Double Play series because of the expenses it incurred during the legal proceedings with Mize.

The Giants pursued Mize after learning that their first baseman, Babe Young, was going to be forced into military service. In 1942, Mize hit for his lowest batting average to that point in his career (.305), but he hit 26 home runs and led the NL with 110 RBI.

== Military service and later career ==
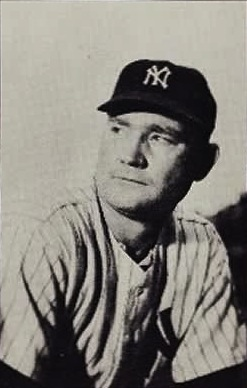
Mize with the Yankees

Mize spent 1943 through 1945 in military service during World War II. During his service he played for the Great Lakes Naval Station baseball team for service members and new personnel in training. Mize hit 17 home runs in 51 games and batted over .475 while manning first base for the Bluejackets. Other team members included: Phil Rizzuto who belonged to the Yankees; outfielders Sam Chapman, Dom DiMaggio and Barney McCosky; Frankie Pytlak; and Brooklyn shortstop Pee Wee Reese, and Johnny Lipon. The team was considered one of the best WWII era teams assembled.

Returning to the Giants in 1946, a broken toe caused him to fall one short of the home run title, won by Ralph Kiner of the Pittsburgh Pirates. In 1947 he rebounded to hit 51 home runs and tie Kiner for the league lead. He also led the league in runs and RBI, and became the first (and so far only) player to strike out fewer than fifty times while hitting fifty home runs. Mize's 1947 totals in runs, home runs and RBI were all career highs. In 1948, Mize and Kiner again tied for the league home run championship with 40 each. Mize was traded to the New York Yankees late in the 1949 season after expressing discontent with his playing time.

Mize spent the last five years of his career with the Yankees, mostly as a part-time player, ending in 1953. He was, however, considered a valuable contributor to their winning five consecutive American League pennants and World Series titles. Despite spending part of the 1950 season on minor league rehab, he hit 25 home runs to become the second player to have a 25-home run season in both leagues. In the 1952 World Series against the Brooklyn Dodgers, he hit three home runs, one as a pinch-hitter, and was robbed of a fourth by Dodger right fielder Carl Furillo, who made a leaping catch above the fence in the 11th inning to preserve a win for the Dodgers.

In October 1953, Mize announced his retirement. He said that he would rather retire while he was still popular with fans than to "hang around until they start to boo." When he retired, Mize had the major league record for the most games with three home runs with six; Sammy Sosa and Mookie Betts later tied the record. Mize also was one of a handful of players (including Babe Ruth) to do it in both leagues — five times in the National League and once in the American. He was the first player to hit three home runs in a game twice in one season in 1938 and did it twice again in 1940. He finished his career with 359 home runs.

Mize still holds Cardinals team records for most home runs in a season by a left-handed batter, most season RBI by a left hander, and most games with three or more home runs with 6. He and Carl Yastrzemski are the only players to have three seasons of hitting 40 or more home runs, without a season of hitting between 30 and 39 home runs.

Mize was a strong pinch hitter in his MLB career, posting a .292 batting average (52-for-178) with 7 home runs and 56 RBI in 215 pinch-hitting appearances.

== Later life ==
After his 1953 retirement, Mize worked as a radio commentator, scout and a hitting coach for the New York / San Francisco Giants (1955–60). He coached the Kansas City Athletics in 1961.

In the 1970s, Mize made his home in St. Augustine, Florida, working for a development by the Deltona Corporation called St. Augustine Shores. A picture of his house is included in David Nolan's book The Houses of St. Augustine. He was chosen by the Veterans Committee of the Baseball Hall of Fame in 1981. He had appeared on the regular Hall of Fame ballot in the 1960s and 1970s, where his highest vote percentage had been 43% in 1971.

Mize spent the last few years of his life at his home in Demorest, Georgia. He underwent heart surgery in 1982 but returned to good health. He died in his sleep of cardiac arrest in 1993.

== Legacy ==
Upon Mize's death, Ralph Kiner described him as "kind of an irascible guy" on the field, but "a very affable guy and a great storyteller" off the field. Mize's batting statistics were overshadowed by those of bigger stars of his era such as Ted Williams, Joe DiMaggio, Stan Musial, and Jackie Robinson. Mize's lifetime on-base percentage of .397 has become more appreciated in the light of sabermetric analysis.

In 2013, the Bob Feller Act of Valor Award honored Mize as one of 37 Baseball Hall of Fame members for his service in the United States Navy during World War II.

In January 2014, the Cardinals announced Mize among 22 former players and personnel to be inducted into the St. Louis Cardinals Hall of Fame and Museum for the inaugural class of 2014. The Johnny Mize Baseball Museum is located at Piedmont College. The college also honors the slugger with the Johnny Mize Athletic Center, a sports complex that houses the school's basketball arena.

== See also ==
- 50 home run club
- List of Major League Baseball career home run leaders
- List of Major League Baseball career hits leaders
- List of Major League Baseball career runs scored leaders
- List of Major League Baseball career runs batted in leaders
- List of Major League Baseball annual runs batted in leaders
- List of Major League Baseball batting champions
- List of Major League Baseball annual home run leaders
- List of Major League Baseball annual runs scored leaders
- List of Major League Baseball annual doubles leaders
- List of Major League Baseball annual triples leaders
- List of Major League Baseball players to hit for the cycle
- Major League Baseball titles leaders
- List of St. Louis Cardinals team records

Preceded by Harry Danning	Hitting for the cycle July 13, 1940	Succeeded by Buddy Rosar
