= Luke Easter =

Luke Easter may refer to:

- Luke Easter (baseball) (1915–1979), American baseball player
- Luke Easter (musician), vocalist for the band Tourniquet
