= Joe Greene (baseball) =

American baseball player

- Catcher
- Born: October 17, 1911; Stone Mountain, Georgia, U.S.
- Died: July 19, 1989 (aged 77); Stone Mountain, Georgia, U.S.
- Batted: Right Threw: Right

debut
- 1932, for the Atlanta Black Crackers

Last appearance
- 1948, for the Cleveland Buckeyes
- Stats at Baseball Reference

Teams
- Atlanta Black Crackers (1932, 1937–1938); Homestead Grays (1936); Kansas City Monarchs (1939–1942, 1946–1947); Cleveland Buckeyes (1948)

Career highlights and awards
- 2× All-Star (1940, 1942); Negro League World Series champion (1942)

James Elbert "Joe" Greene (October 17, 1911 – July 19, 1989) was an American catcher in Negro league baseball. He played between 1932 and 1948.

Greene served with the 92nd Division in the US Army as an anti-tank gunner between 1943 and 1945, in both Algiers and Italy. When his company entered Milan, they were given the task of removing the bodies of Benito Mussolini and his mistress Clara Petacci, who had been publicly hanged in the Piazzale Loreto on April 29, 1945.
