= Donald Reeves =

American baseball player (1911–1973)

- Right fielder
- Born: July 31, 1911; Atlanta, Georgia, U.S.
- Died: January 3, 1973 (aged 61); Sandersville, Georgia, U.S.
- Batted: Left Threw: Left

Negro league baseball debut
- 1937, for the Atlanta Black Crackers

Last appearance
- 1941, for the Chicago American Giants

Career statistics
- Batting average: .324
- Hits: 90
- Home runs: 9
- Runs batted in: 64
- Stolen bases: 8

Teams
- Atlanta Black Crackers (1937–1938); Indianapolis ABCs (1939); Chicago American Giants (1940–1941)

Career highlights and awards
- All-Star (1940)

Donald Ray Reeves (July 31, 1911 – January 3, 1973), nicknamed "Soup", was an American professional baseball right fielder in the Negro leagues. He played from 1937 to 1941 with the Atlanta Black Crackers, Indianapolis ABCs, and the Chicago American Giants. He was a graduate of Clark Atlanta University, then known as Clark College, where he played baseball, basketball, and football. He was selected to the 1940 East-West Game. After his baseball career, he became a teacher in Atlanta, Georgia.
