= Buck Leonard =

American baseball player (1907–1997)

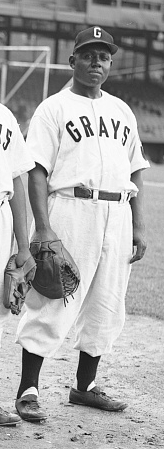
- Leonard in 1947
- First baseman
- Born: September 8, 1907; Rocky Mount, North Carolina, U.S.
- Died: November 27, 1997 (aged 90); Rocky Mount, North Carolina, U.S.
- Batted: Left Threw: Left

Negro leagues debut
- 1933, for the Brooklyn Royal Giants

Last Negro leagues appearance
- 1950, for the Homestead Grays

Negro leagues (Note: On December 16, 2020, Major League Baseball declared the Negro leagues, from the span of 1920–1948, to be a "Major League". Leonard's statistics reflect his time in the Negro leagues from 1935, the third year of his career, until 1948.) statistics
- Batting average: .346
- Home runs: 97
- Runs batted in: 548
- Stats at Baseball Reference

Teams
- Brooklyn Royal Giants (1933); Homestead Grays (1934–1950)

Career highlights and awards
- 11× All-Star (1935, 1937–1941, 1943–1946, 1948²); 3× Negro World Series champion (1943, 1944, 1948); 2× Negro National League batting champion (1935, 1938); Negro National League home run leader (1940) (Note: Tied with Henry McHenry, Bill Hoskins and Lennie Pearson.); Washington Nationals Ring of Honor; Pittsburgh Pirates Hall of Fame

Member of the National

Baseball Hall of Fame
- Induction: 1972
- Election method: Negro Leagues Committee

Walter Fenner "Buck" Leonard (September 8, 1907 – November 27, 1997) was an American first baseman in Negro league baseball and in the Mexican League. After growing up in North Carolina, he played for the Homestead Grays between 1934 and 1950, batting fourth behind Josh Gibson for many years. The Grays teams of the 1930s and 1940s were considered some of the best teams in Negro league history. Leonard and Gibson are two of only nine players in league history to win multiple batting titles. In 1940-1941, he batted .390 for the Puerto Rican team Indios de Mayagüez, connecting 8 home runs and impulsing 45 runs, leading the league in home runs, doubles and slugging (.754).

Leonard never played in Major League Baseball (MLB); he declined a 1952 offer of an MLB contract because he felt he was too old. Late in life, Leonard worked as a physical education instructor and was the vice-president of a minor league baseball team. He and Gibson were elected to the Baseball Hall of Fame in 1972. In 1999, he was ranked number 47 on the 100 Greatest Baseball Players list by The Sporting News.

== Early life ==
Born in Rocky Mount, North Carolina, Leonard was the brother of fellow Negro leaguer Charlie Leonard. His father worked as a railroad fireman while his mother was a homemaker who cared for the six Leonard children. Leonard's parents called him "Buddy", but his younger brother began mispronouncing it "Bucky". Family members began calling him "Buck", a name which stuck with him throughout his life. When Leonard was about seven years old, he would sneak over to the baseball field of the local white team and watch games through the fence. Local police even once arrested Leonard and his friends when they were caught peeking through the fence at the segregated field.

Leonard's father died when he was eleven and Leonard picked up jobs after school to help his family. There was no black high school in Rocky Mount, so Leonard finished the eighth grade and went to work shining shoes for a rail station. He also worked in a hosiery mill and for the Atlantic Coast Line Railroad. He later earned a GED by correspondence. He began playing semi-professional baseball while working for the railroad, then decided to pursue his living with the sport.

== Negro league career ==
He began his Negro league career in 1933 with the Brooklyn Royal Giants, then moved to the legendary Homestead Grays in 1934, the team he played for until his retirement in 1950. The Grays of the late 1930s through the mid-1940s are considered one of the greatest teams of any race ever assembled. The team won nine league pennants in a row during that time.

Leonard batted fourth in their lineup behind Josh Gibson. He led the Negro leagues in batting average in 1948 with a mark of .395, and usually either led the league in home runs or finished second in homers to teammate Gibson. Since Gibson was known as the "Black Babe Ruth" and Leonard was a first baseman, Buck Leonard was inevitably called the "Black Lou Gehrig." Together, the pair was colloquially known as the "Thunder Twins" or "Dynamite Twins". In fact, Negro league star Monte Irvin said that if Leonard had been allowed in the major leagues, baseball fans "might have called Lou Gehrig the white Buck Leonard. He was that good." The Grays disbanded after 1950.

== Mexican League career ==
Beginning in 1951, Leonard went to the Mexican League. Teams played three games per week in this league, a pace that worked well for the aging player. Leonard said that he got sick from the water every year that he returned to Mexico, but he otherwise enjoyed the league. For much of his time in Mexico, he was managed by Cuban baseball star Martín Dihigo. Leonard was impressed by Dihigo's baseball knowledge. In 1952, Leonard was offered a major league contract, but he believed that at age 45 he was too old and might embarrass himself and hurt the cause of integration. He stayed in Mexico through 1955, playing for teams in Torreón, Xalapa, Durango and Obregón.

== Minor league career ==
In 1953, Leonard made his only appearances in "organized" ball, playing for the unaffiliated Portsmouth Merrimacs of the class B Piedmont League, hitting .333 in 10 games and 46 at bats.

== Later life ==
Leonard following his playing career

After retiring as a player, Leonard worked as a truant officer, served as a physical education instructor and started a realty company. From 1962 to 1972, he was vice president of the Rocky Mount Leafs and then, from 1973 to 1975, of the Rocky Mount Phillies. The Leafs were a Class A Carolina League farm team for the Detroit Tigers from 1965 to 1972. In 1962 and 1963. the Leafs were a farm club of the Cincinnati Reds and in 1964, the Leafs were a farm club of the Washington Senators. The Phillies were a farm team for the Philadelphia Phillies.

Leonard was elected to the Baseball Hall of Fame in 1972 along with Gibson. At his induction ceremony on August 7 of that year, Leonard said, "We in the Negro leagues felt like we were contributing something to baseball, too, when we were playing. We played with a round ball and we played with a round bat. And we wore baseball shoes and wore baseball uniforms and we thought we were making a contribution to baseball. We loved the game and we liked to play it. If we didn't, we wouldn't have played because there wasn't any money in it."

Leonard was also inducted into the North Carolina Sports Hall of Fame in 1974. He suffered a stroke in the 1980s. In 1994, the Major League Baseball All-Star Game was held in Pittsburgh, hometown of the Grays, and the 88-year-old Leonard was named an honorary captain. He appeared wearing a replica of a Grays uniform. Shortly before his death in 1997, Leonard was the subject of a North Carolina General Assembly proclamation recognizing his contributions to baseball. His death late that year stemmed from complications of his earlier stroke.

== Legacy ==
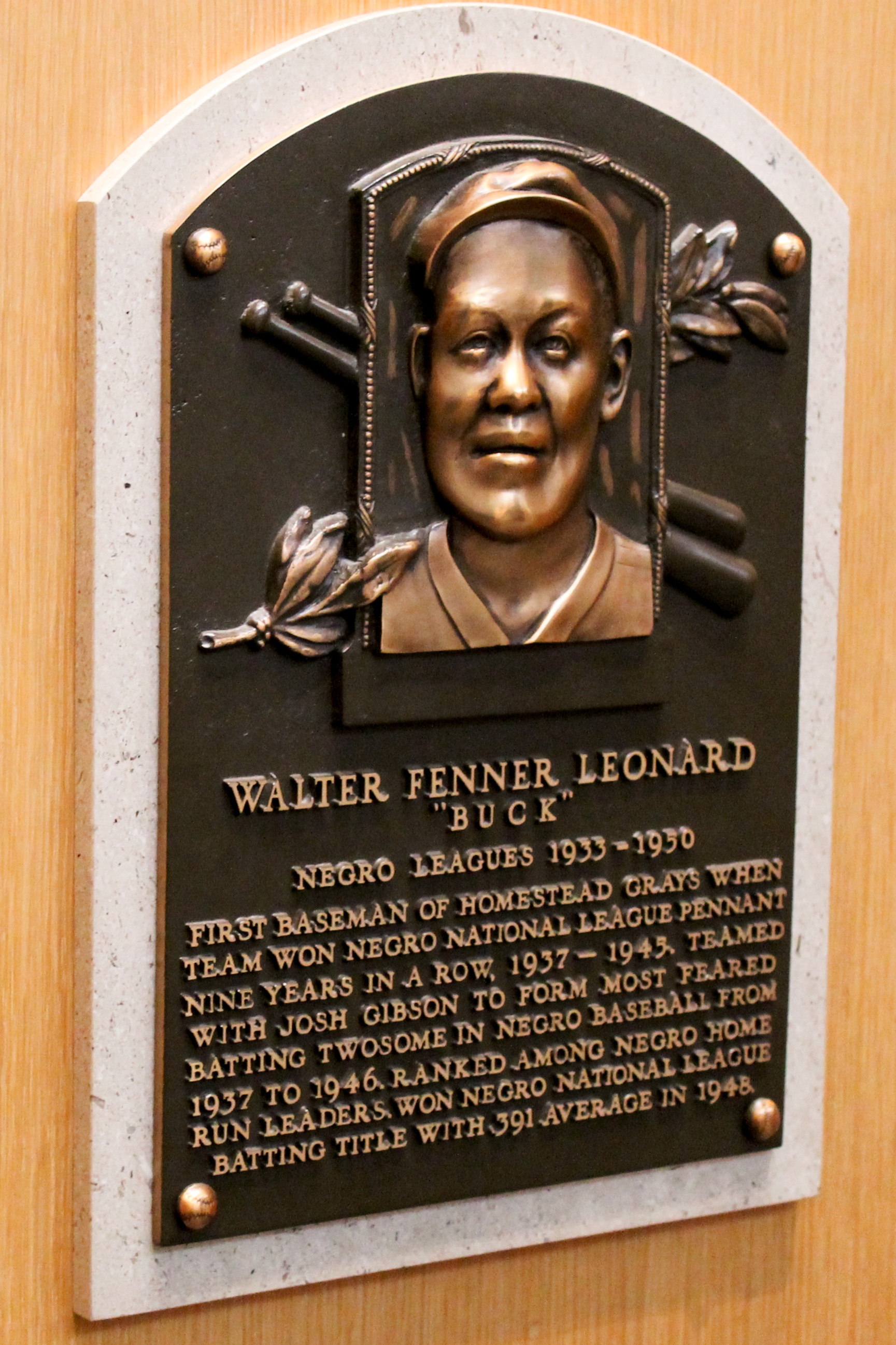
Baseball Hall of Fame induction plaque

In 1999, he ranked Number 47 on The Sporting News' list of the 100 Greatest Baseball Players, one of five players so honored who played all or most of their careers in the Negro leagues, and was nominated as a finalist for the Major League Baseball All-Century Team.

Leonard's contemporaries, including catcher Roy Campanella and pitcher Dave Barnhill, cited his quick bat as one of his greatest strengths. "You could put a fastball in a shotgun and you couldn't shoot it by him," Barnhill said. Negro league pitcher Leon Day said that he would have rather pitched against Gibson than Leonard. Grays owner Cumberland Posey described Leonard as one of the most talented clutch hitters in the Negro leagues.

He was named to the Washington Nationals Ring of Honor for his "significant contribution to the game of baseball in Washington, D.C." as part of the Homestead Grays on August 10, 2010.

== Career statistics ==
=== Negro leagues ===
The first official statistics for the Negro leagues were compiled as part of a statistical study sponsored by the National Baseball Hall of Fame and supervised by Larry Lester and Dick Clark; a research team collected statistics from thousands of boxscores of league-sanctioned games. The first results from this study were the statistics for Negro league Hall of Famers elected prior to 2006, which were published in Shades of Glory by Lawrence D. Hogan. These statistics included the official Negro league statistics for Buck Leonard as of 2006.

Year	Team	G	AB	R	H	2B	3B	HR	RBI	SB	BB	BA	SLG
1934	Homestead	20	79	16	28	4	0	5	14	0	3	.354	.595
1935	Homestead	36	147	26	50	10	1	3	10	3	15	.340	.483
1936	Homestead	17	62	15	15	1	1	2	3	1	12	.242	.387
1937	Homestead p	28	105	39	39	8	1	7	17	1	20	.371	.667
1938	Homestead p	27	99	21	33	0	0	3	8	0	11	.333	.424
1939	Homestead	22	72	23	30	5	0	5	23	2	17	.417	.694
1940	Homestead p	44	152	40	60	12	3	8	44	4	32	.395	.671
1941	Homestead p	36	123	40	36	4	5	8	29	6	30	.293	.602
1942	Homestead p	26	87	10	18	3	0	0	10	1	14	.207	.241
1943	Homestead c	55	200	55	59	11	7	4	41	2	38	.295	.480
1944	Homestead c	34	121	30	34	8	5	5	27	1	18	.281	.554
1945	Homestead p	16	59	7	17	1	2	0	7	0	7	.288	.373
1946	Homestead	30	102	18	27	3	1	3	26	3	24	.265	.402
1947	Homestead	11	30	7	16	0	0	4	8	1	8	.533	.933
1948	Homestead c	10	34	5	9	3	0	3	8	0	8	.265	.618
Total	15 seasons	412	1472	352	471	73	26	60	275	25	257	.320	.527
p = pennant; c = pennant and Negro World Series championship.

After seven Negro leagues were declared major leagues in December 2020, Baseball Reference added Negro League statistics compiled by the Seamheads Negro Leagues Database to its website.

Link including Negro Leagues statistics officially entered into Major League Baseball’s official records: https://www.mlb.com/player/buck-leonard-818520

These statistics include the official Negro major league statistics (which differ from Major League Baseball's own record book) for Buck Leonard as of 2021. (Note: Leonard's statistics from 1934 are not included since the Homestead Grays did not play in a Negro major league in 1934.)

Year	Team	G	AB	R	H	2B	3B	HR	RBI	SB	BB	BA	SLG	OBP
1935	Homestead	40	157	30	61	18	3	4	36	5	17	.389	.618	.451
1936	Homestead	35	124	35	43	3	4	6	34	2	29	.347	.581	.471
1937	Homestead p	42	170	54	64	15	3	13	55	2	25	.376	.729	.462
1938	Homestead p	42	150	41	63	11	5	9	53	1	24	.420	.740	.500
1939	Homestead	30	109	35	42	10	0	11	48	2	21	.385	.780	.485
1940	Homestead p	49	168	44	62	12	3	8	48	2	34	.369	.619	.475
1941	Homestead p	47	161	54	56	9	6	11	40	6	38	.348	.683	.472
1942	Homestead p	30	100	16	22	5	0	0	12	3	19	.220	.270	.345
1943	Homestead c	67	254	71	84	16	8	4	63	2	47	.331	.504	.439
1944	Homestead c	49	179	47	60	14	6	7	43	1	29	.335	.598	.428
1945	Homestead p	36	138	30	47	5	3	5	30	0	20	.341	.529	.431
1946	Homestead	50	169	37	57	7	4	7	47	3	38	.337	.550	.459
1947	Homestead	35	109	20	33	5	1	6	24	4	26	.303	.532	.441
1948	Homestead c	35	113	20	30	7	0	4	17	1	27	.265	.434	.415
Total	14 seasons	587	2101	534	724	137	46	95	550	34	394	.345	.589	.450
p = pennant; c = pennant and Negro World Series championship.

=== Mexican League ===
Year	Team	G	AB	R	H	2B	3B	HR	RBI	SB	BB	BA	SLG
1951	Torreón	83	273	64	88	19	1	14	64	5	87	.322	.553
1952	Torreón	86	295	50	96	15	1	8	71	12	90	.325	.464
1953	Torreón	58	190	39	63	20	2	5	38	4	58	.332	.537
Total	3 seasons	227	758	153	247	54	4	27	173	21	235	.326	.515
