= Johnny Davis (baseball, born 1917) =

American baseball player (1917–1982)

- Outfielder
- Born: February 6, 1917; Ashland, Virginia, U.S.
- Died: November 17, 1982 (aged 65); Fort Lauderdale, Florida, U.S.
- Batted: Right Threw: Right

debut
- 1941, for the Newark Eagles

Last appearance
- 1949, for the Houston Eagles

Negro National League statistics
- Batting average: .314
- Home runs: 18
- Runs scored: 90
- Stats at Baseball Reference

Teams
- Newark Eagles (1941–1948); Houston Eagles (1949)

Career highlights and awards
- 3× East-West All-Star Game selection (1944–1945; 1949); Negro League World Series champion (1946)

John Howard Davis (February 6, 1917 – November 17, 1982) was an American outfielder in Negro league baseball and Minor League Baseball. He played professionally between 1941 and 1954.
