= Red Longley =

American baseball player

- Outfielder
- Born: September 7, 1909; Little Rock, Arkansas, U.S.
- Died: July, 1977; Memphis, Tennessee, U.S.
- Batted: Right Threw: Right

Negro league baseball debut
- 1934, for the Memphis Red Sox

Last appearance
- 1951, for the New Orleans Eagles

Teams
- Memphis Red Sox (1934–1935); Washington Elite Giants (1936); Memphis Red Sox (1937–1941, 1943-1950); New Orleans Eagles (1951)

Wayman Longley (September 7, 1909 – July, 1977), nicknamed "Red", was an American Negro league outfielder from the 1930s into the 1950s.

A native of Little Rock, Arkansas, Longley made his Negro leagues debut in 1934 with the Memphis Red Sox, and played most of his long career with the club. He was selected to play in the East–West All-Star Game in 1938 and 1944. Longley played for the Elmwood Giants of the Mandak League in 1950, and finished his Negro leagues career in 1951 with the New Orleans Eagles. He died in Memphis, Tennessee in 1977 at age 67.
