= Milton Lewis (baseball) =

Professional baseball player

- Second baseman
- Threw: Right

Negro league baseball debut
- 1922, for the Richmond Giants

Last appearance
- 1928, for the Lincoln Giants

Teams
- Richmond Giants (1922); Harrisburg Giants (1922); Bacharach Giants (1922-1924, 1926-1928); Wilmington Potomacs (1925); Lincoln Giants (1928)

Milton Lewis, nicknamed "Red", was a Negro league baseball second baseman in the 1920s.

Lewis made his Negro leagues debut in 1922, spending time with the Richmond Giants, Harrisburg Giants and Bacharach Giants. He stayed with the Bacharach Giants until his release in April 1925.

After spending time with the Wilmington Potomacs in 1925, he returned to the Bacharach Giants in 1926 and knocked a home run and eight hits for the club in their 1927 Colored World Series loss to the Chicago American Giants. Lewis finished his career in 1928 with the Lincoln Giants.
