= 1878 Milwaukee Grays season =

1878 Milwaukee Grays
- League: National League
- Ballpark: Eclipse Park II
- City: Milwaukee, Wisconsin
- Record: 15–45 (.250)
- League place: 6th
- Manager: Jack Chapman

The Milwaukee Grays were members of the National League for only the 1878 season, having played as an independent team in 1877. They finished in sixth place, one of only two teams to finish below .500.

== Regular season ==
=== Season standings ===
National League
Team	W	L	Pct.	GB	Home	Road
Boston Red Caps	41	19	.683	—	23‍–‍7	18‍–‍12
Cincinnati Reds	37	23	.617	4	25‍–‍8	12‍–‍15
Providence Grays	33	27	.550	8	17‍–‍13	16‍–‍14
Chicago White Stockings	30	30	.500	11	17‍–‍18	13‍–‍12
Indianapolis Blues	24	36	.400	17	10‍–‍17	14‍–‍19
Milwaukee Grays	15	45	.250	26	7‍–‍18	8‍–‍27

=== Record vs. opponents ===
1878 National League record Sources:
Team	BSN	CHI	CIN	IND	MIL	PRO
Boston	—	8–4	6–6	10–2	11–1	6–6
Chicago	4–8	—	2–10	8–4	10–2	6–6–1
Cincinnati	6–6	10–2	—	4–8–1	8–4	9–3
Indianapolis	2–10	4–8	8–4–1	—	8–4–1	2–10–1
Milwaukee	1–11	2–10	4–8	4–8–1	—	4–8
Providence	6–6	6–6–1	3–9	10–2–1	8–4	—

=== Roster ===
1878 Milwaukee Grays
Roster
Pitchers: Sam Weaver; Catchers: Charlie Bennett; Alamazoo Jennings; Jake Knodell	Infielders: Frank Bliss; George Creamer; Joe Ellick; Will Foley; Jake Goodman; John Peters; Billy Redmond	Outfielders: Abner Dalrymple; Mike Golden; Bill Holbert; Pidgey Morgan	Manager: Jack Chapman

== Player stats ==
=== Batting ===
==== Starters by position ====
Note: Pos = Position; G = Games played; AB = At bats; H = Hits; Avg. = Batting average; HR = Home runs; RBI = Runs batted in

Pos	Player	G	AB	H	Avg.	HR	RBI
C	Charlie Bennett	49	184	45	.245	1	12
1B	Jake Goodman	60	252	62	.246	1	27
2B	John Peters	55	246	76	.309	0	22
3B	Will Foley	56	229	62	.271	0	22
SS	Billy Redmond	48	187	43	.230	0	21
OF	Abner Dalrymple	61	271	96	.354	0	15
OF	Mike Golden	55	214	44	.206	0	20
OF	Bill Holbert	45	173	32	.185	0	12

==== Other batters ====
Note: G = Games played; AB = At bats; H = Hits; Avg. = Batting average; HR = Home runs; RBI = Runs batted in

Player	G	AB	H	Avg.	HR	RBI
George Creamer	50	193	41	.212	0	15
Pidgey Morgan	14	56	11	.196	0	5
Jake Knowdell	4	14	3	.214	0	2
Joe Ellick	3	13	2	.154	0	1
Frank Bliss	2	8	1	.125	0	0
Alamazoo Jennings	1	2	0	.000	0	0

=== Pitching ===
==== Starting pitchers ====
Note: G = Games pitched; IP = Innings pitched; W = Wins; L = Losses; ERA = Earned run average; SO = Strikeouts

Player	G	IP	W	L	ERA	SO
Sam Weaver	45	383.0	12	31	1.95	95
Mike Golden	22	161.0	3	13	4.14	52

==== Relief pitchers ====
Note: G = Games pitched; W = Wins; L = Losses; SV = Saves; ERA = Earned run average; SO = Strikeouts

Player	G	W	L	SV	ERA	SO
Joe Ellick	1	0	1	0	3.00	1
