= Milwaukee Grays all-time roster =

List of baseball players

The following is a list of players and who appeared in at least one game for the Milwaukee Grays franchise of the National League in 1878.

== B ==
- Charlie Bennett
- Frank Bliss

== C ==
- George Creamer

== D ==
- Abner Dalrymple

== E ==
- Joe Ellick

== F ==
- Will Foley

== G ==
- Mike Golden
- Jake Goodman

== H ==
- Bill Holbert

== J ==
- Alamazoo Jennings

== K ==
- Jake Knowdell

== M ==
- Dan "Pidgey" Morgan

== P ==
- John Peters

== R ==
- Billy Redmond

== W ==
- Sam Weaver
