= List of Major League Baseball progressive career hits leaders =

This list displays a chronology of the annual top ten leaders in career base hits in Major League Baseball (MLB) from 1876 through 2022.

The table assists in identifying the most significant players in each era, and helps to understand the importance of many past stars. Before Pete Rose broke Ty Cobb's record for career hits, for example, Tris Speaker, Stan Musial, and Hank Aaron had each reached the number two spot in succession.

It is also quite valuable to identify the leaders during the 19th century, when seasons were shorter (usually from 60 to 130 games); while nearly 250 players have now reached the 2,000-hit plateau, barely a dozen had done so by the end of the 19th century.

In the era before 1893, when the distance between the pitcher and home plate was extended from 45 feet to 60 feet, long-neglected stars Deacon White and Paul Hines were mainstays among the top five, along with Cap Anson and Jim O'Rourke.

This chart uses the hit totals that Major League Baseball officially recognizes, as maintained and provided by the Elias Sports Bureau; they are derived from the annual official league statistics, even when those totals have been proven by later research to be in error. Particularly with regard to players from before 1920, these totals often differ from those used by ESPN, CNN/Sports Illustrated, The Sporting News, the Baseball-Reference website, or by MLB's two longtime official encyclopedias, The Baseball Encyclopedia and Total Baseball. They are also not the same as the historical totals displayed on MLB's official website.

While the specific totals may vary between sources, and slight variations in the order may result, the leaders would overwhelmingly be the same regardless of which set of numbers is used; except for 1904, in no year does more than one player drop out of the top 10 when a different version of the statistics is employed. Furthermore, this table accurately represents what observers of each era believed to be true.

== 1876–1900 ==
Year	1st	2nd	3rd	4th	5th	6th	7th	8th	9th	10th	10th (tie)
1876	Barnes; 138	Peters; 111	Anson; 110	McVey; 107	D White; 104	Higham; 102 (tie)	O'Rourke; 102 (tie)	Hines; 101	G Wright; 100	G Hall; 98	
1877	D White; 186	Anson; 177	O'Rourke; 176	McVey; 174	Peters; 173	G Hall; 167	G Wright; 160	Barnes; 157	Hines; 152	Clapp; 150	
1878	D White; 264	Anson; 263	McVey; 252	Peters; 248	O'Rourke; 246	Start; 242	Hines; 239	Clapp; 224	Ferguson; 220 (tie)	G Wright; 220 (tie)	
1879	Hines; 384	D White; 373	O'Rourke; 372	McVey; 357	Anson; 353	Start; 343	Peters; 340	G Wright; 328	T York; 302	Clapp; 300	
1880	Hines; 493	O'Rourke; 472	Anson; 470	Start; 436	Peters; 419	D White; 412	Clapp; 387	Burdock; 376	Morrill; 358	McVey; 357	
1881	Anson; 607	Hines; 594	O'Rourke; 577	Start; 550	D White; 511	Peters; 468	Clapp; 452	Morrill; 448	Burdock; 443	T York; 437	
1882	Anson; 733	Hines; 711	O'Rourke; 681	Start; 667	D White; 606	Peters; 560	Dalrymple; 547 (tie)	Morrill; 547 (tie)	T York; 523	Burdock; 518	
1883	Anson; 860	Hines; 843	O'Rourke; 822	Start; 772	D White; 718	Morrill; 676	Dalrymple; 655	Burdock; 650	Sutton; 647	K Kelly; 620	
1884	Anson; 1019	Hines; 989	O'Rourke; 979	Start; 875	D White; 860	Dalrymple; 815	Sutton; 803	Morrill; 787	K Kelly; 773	Burdock; 744	
1885	Anson; 1163	O'Rourke; 1122	Hines; 1100	Start; 978 (tie)	D White; 978 (tie)	Dalrymple; 950	Sutton; 946	K Kelly; 899	Morrill; 876	Shafer; 794	
1886	Anson; 1350	O'Rourke; 1258	Hines; 1252	D White; 1120	Sutton; 1084	K Kelly; 1074	Dalrymple; 1027	Start; 1005	Morrill; 982	Connor; 960	
1887	Anson; 1574	Hines; 1447	O'Rourke; 1407	D White; 1282	K Kelly; 1281	Sutton; 1192	Connor; 1169	Morrill; 1157	Richardson; 1153	Dalrymple; 1148 (tie)	Stovey; 1148
1888	Anson; 1751	Hines; 1591	O'Rourke; 1519	D White; 1439	K Kelly; 1421	Stovey; 1319	Connor; 1309	Brouthers; 1269	Morrill; 1253	Richardson; 1230	
1889	Anson; 1928	Hines; 1739	O'Rourke; 1680	K Kelly; 1570	Stovey; 1499	D White; 1496	Connor; 1466	Brouthers; 1450	Richardson; 1393	Glasscock; 1358	
1890	Anson; 2085	O'Rourke; 1852	Hines; 1832	K Kelly; 1684	Stovey; 1647	Connor; 1646	D White; 1612	Brouthers; 1610	Richardson; 1577	Glasscock; 1530	
1891	Anson; 2243	O'Rourke; 2019	Hines; 1884	Stovey; 1799	Connor; 1786	K Kelly; 1780	Brouthers; 1770	Richardson; 1646	J Ward; 1645	Glasscock; 1620	
1892	Anson; 2397	O'Rourke; 2152	Brouthers; 1967	Connor; 1945	Hines; 1884	Stovey; 1876	K Kelly; 1836	J Ward; 1812	Glasscock; 1774	Richardson; 1705	
1893	Anson; 2520	O'Rourke; 2313	Connor; 2103	Brouthers; 2060	J Ward; 2006	Glasscock; 1933	Stovey; 1925	Hines; 1884	K Kelly; 1853	Browning; 1716	
1894	Anson; 2657	O'Rourke; 2313	Connor; 2248	Brouthers; 2242	J Ward; 2151	Glasscock; 2027	Stovey; 1925	Hines; 1884	K Kelly; 1853	McPhee; 1773	
1895	Anson; 2818	Connor; 2379	O'Rourke; 2313	Brouthers; 2277	J Ward; 2151	Glasscock; 2079	Stovey; 1925	McPhee; 1902	Latham; 1887	Hines; 1884	
1896	Anson; 2953	Connor; 2516	Brouthers; 2349	O'Rourke; 2313	J Ward; 2151	Glasscock; 2079	McPhee; 2032	Thompson; 1983	Stovey; 1925	Latham; 1894	
1897	Anson; 3081	Connor; 2535	Brouthers; 2349	O'Rourke; 2313	J Ward; 2151	McPhee; 2117	Glasscock; 2079	Thompson; 1986	T Brown; 1948	Stovey; 1925	
1898	Anson; 3081	Connor; 2535	Brouthers; 2349	O'Rourke; 2313	McPhee; 2237	J Ward; 2151	Glasscock; 2079	McKean; 2071	J Ryan; 2044	Thompson; 2009	
1899	Anson; 3081	Connor; 2535	Brouthers; 2349	McPhee; 2342	O'Rourke; 2313	J Ryan; 2202	J Ward; 2151	McKean; 2147	Duffy; 2140	Glasscock; 2079	
1900	Anson; 3081	Connor; 2535	Brouthers; 2349	McPhee; 2342	J Ryan; 2317	O'Rourke; 2313	Van Haltren; 2245	Duffy; 2194	Delahanty; 2171	J Ward; 2151	

== 1901–1960 ==
Year	1st	2nd	3rd	4th	5th	6th	7th	8th	9th	10th	10th (tie)
1901	Anson; 3081	Connor; 2535	Van Haltren; 2431	Delahanty; 2363	Brouthers; 2349	McPhee; 2342	J Ryan; 2317	O'Rourke; 2313	Duffy; 2282	Burkett; 2248	
1902	Anson; 3081	Delahanty; 2541	Connor; 2535	J Ryan; 2470	Van Haltren; 2455	Burkett; 2416	Beckley; 2351	Brouthers; 2349	McPhee; 2342	O'Rourke; 2313	
1903	Anson; 3081	Delahanty; 2593	J Ryan; 2577	Burkett; 2568	Connor; 2535	Van Haltren; 2527	Beckley; 2501	Brouthers; 2349	McPhee; 2342	O'Rourke; 2313	
1904	Anson; 3081	Burkett; 2725	Beckley; 2680	Delahanty; 2593	J Ryan; 2577	Connor; 2535	Van Haltren; 2527	Brouthers; 2349	McPhee; 2342	Cross; 2337	
1905	Anson; 3081	Burkett; 2872	Beckley; 2827	Delahanty; 2593	J Ryan; 2577	Connor; 2535	Van Haltren; 2527	Keeler; 2493	Cross; 2492	Brouthers; 2349	
1906	Anson; 3081	Beckley; 2906	Burkett; 2872	Keeler; 2673	Cross; 2622	Delahanty; 2593	J Ryan; 2577	Connor; 2535	Van Haltren; 2527	G Davis; 2472	
1907	Anson; 3081	Beckley; 2930	Burkett; 2872	Keeler; 2772	Cross; 2654	Delahanty; 2593	G Davis; 2583	J Ryan; 2577	Connor; 2535	Van Haltren; 2527	
1908	Anson; 3081	Beckley; 2930	Burkett; 2872	Keeler; 2857	G Davis; 2674	Cross; 2654	Delahanty; 2593	J Ryan; 2577	Connor; 2535	Van Haltren; 2527	
1909	Anson; 3081	Keeler; 2952	Beckley; 2930	Burkett; 2872	G Davis; 2683	Cross; 2654	Delahanty; 2593	J Ryan; 2577	Connor; 2535	Van Haltren; 2527	
1910	Anson; 3081	Keeler; 2955	Beckley; 2930	Burkett; 2872	G Davis; 2683	Cross; 2654	Delahanty; 2593	J Ryan; 2577	Clarke; 2574	Connor; 2535	
1911	Anson; 3081	Keeler; 2955	Beckley; 2930	Burkett; 2872	Clarke; 2701	G Davis; 2683	Cross; 2654	Wagner; 2646	Delahanty; 2593	Lajoie; 2581	
1912	Anson; 3081	Keeler; 2955	Beckley; 2930	Burkett; 2872	Wagner; 2827	Lajoie; 2746	Clarke; 2701	G Davis; 2683	Cross; 2654	Delahanty; 2593	
1913	Anson; 3081	Keeler; 2955	Wagner; 2951	Beckley; 2930	Lajoie; 2902	Burkett; 2872	Clarke; 2702	G Davis; 2683	Cross; 2654	Delahanty; 2593	
1914	Wagner; 3090	Anson; 3081	Lajoie; 3010	Keeler; 2955	Beckley; 2930	Burkett; 2872	Clarke; 2702	G Davis; 2683	Crawford; 2671	Cross; 2654	
1915	Wagner; 3245	Lajoie; 3147	Anson; 3081	Keeler; 2955	Beckley; 2930	Burkett; 2872	Crawford; 2854	Clarke; 2703	G Davis; 2683	Cross; 2654	
1916	Wagner; 3369	Lajoie; 3252	Anson; 3081	Keeler; 2955	Crawford; 2946	Beckley; 2930	Burkett; 2872	Clarke; 2703	G Davis; 2683	Cross; 2654	
1917–1918	Wagner; 3430	Lajoie; 3252	Anson; 3081	Crawford; 2964	Keeler; 2955	Beckley; 2930	Burkett; 2872	Clarke; 2703	G Davis; 2683	Cross; 2654	
1919	Wagner; 3430	Lajoie; 3252	Anson; 3081	Crawford; 2964	Keeler; 2955	Beckley; 2930	Burkett; 2872	Cobb; 2715	Clarke; 2703	G Davis; 2683	
1920	Wagner; 3430	Lajoie; 3252	Anson; 3081	Crawford; 2964	Keeler; 2955	Beckley; 2930	Burkett; 2872	Cobb; 2858	Clarke; 2703	G Davis; 2683	
1921	Wagner; 3430	Lajoie; 3252	Anson; 3081	Cobb; 3055	Crawford; 2964	Keeler; 2955	Beckley; 2930	Burkett; 2872	Clarke; 2703	G Davis; 2683	
1922	Wagner; 3430	Cobb; 3266	Lajoie; 3252	Anson; 3081	Crawford; 2964	Keeler; 2955	Beckley; 2930	Burkett; 2872	Clarke; 2703	G Davis; 2683	
1923	Cobb; 3455	Wagner; 3430	Lajoie; 3252	Anson; 3081	Crawford; 2964	Keeler; 2955	Beckley; 2930	Burkett; 2872	Speaker; 2794	Collins; 2758	
1924	Cobb; 3666	Wagner; 3430	Lajoie; 3252	Anson; 3081	Crawford; 2964	Speaker; 2961	Keeler; 2955	Collins; 2952	Beckley; 2930	Burkett; 2872	
1925	Cobb; 3823	Wagner; 3430	Lajoie; 3252	Speaker; 3128	Collins; 3099	Anson; 3081	Crawford; 2964	Keeler; 2955	Beckley; 2930	Burkett; 2872	
1926	Cobb; 3902	Wagner; 3430	Speaker; 3292	Lajoie; 3252	Collins; 3228	Anson; 3081	Crawford; 2964	Keeler; 2955	Beckley; 2930	Burkett; 2872	
1927	Cobb; 4077	Speaker; 3463	Wagner; 3430	Collins; 3304	Lajoie; 3252	Anson; 3081	Crawford; 2964	Keeler; 2955	Beckley; 2930	Wheat; 2884	
1928–1929	Cobb; 4191	Speaker; 3514	Wagner; 3430	Collins; 3314	Lajoie; 3252	Anson; 3081	Crawford; 2964	Keeler; 2955	Beckley; 2930	Wheat; 2884	
1930–1932	Cobb; 4191	Speaker; 3514	Wagner; 3430	Collins; 3314	Lajoie; 3252	Anson; 3081	Crawford; 2964	Keeler; 2955	Beckley; 2930	Wheat; 2884	
1933	Cobb; 4191	Speaker; 3514	Wagner; 3430	Collins; 3314	Lajoie; 3252	Anson; 3081	Crawford; 2964	Keeler; 2955	Beckley; 2930	Hornsby; 2898	
1934–1936	Cobb; 4191	Speaker; 3514	Wagner; 3430	Collins; 3314	Lajoie; 3252	Anson; 3081	S Rice; 2987	Crawford; 2964	Keeler; 2955	Beckley; 2930	
1937–1940	Cobb; 4191	Speaker; 3514	Wagner; 3430	Collins; 3314	Lajoie; 3252	Anson; 3081	S Rice; 2987	Crawford; 2964	Keeler; 2955	Beckley; 2930 (tie)	Hornsby; 2930
1941	Cobb; 4191	Speaker; 3514	Wagner; 3430	Collins; 3314	Lajoie; 3252	Anson; 3081	S Rice; 2987	Crawford; 2964	P Waner; 2956	Keeler; 2955	
1942	Cobb; 4191	Speaker; 3514	Wagner; 3430	Collins; 3314	Lajoie; 3252	Anson; 3081	P Waner; 3042	S Rice; 2987	Crawford; 2964	Keeler; 2955	
1943	Cobb; 4191	Speaker; 3514	Wagner; 3430	Collins; 3314	Lajoie; 3252	P Waner; 3112	Anson; 3081	S Rice; 2987	Crawford; 2964	Keeler; 2955	
1944–1956	Cobb; 4191	Speaker; 3514	Wagner; 3430	Collins; 3314	Lajoie; 3252	P Waner; 3152	Anson; 3081	S Rice; 2987	Crawford; 2964	Keeler; 2955	
1957	Cobb; 4191	Speaker; 3514	Wagner; 3430	Collins; 3314	Lajoie; 3252	P Waner; 3152	Anson; 3081	S Rice; 2987	Crawford; 2964	Musial; 2957	
1958	Cobb; 4191	Speaker; 3514	Wagner; 3430	Collins; 3314	Lajoie; 3252	P Waner; 3152	Musial; 3116	Anson; 3081	S Rice; 2987	Crawford; 2964	
1959	Cobb; 4191	Speaker; 3514	Wagner; 3430	Collins; 3314	Lajoie; 3252	Musial; 3203	P Waner; 3152	Anson; 3081	S Rice; 2987	Crawford; 2964	
1960	Cobb; 4191	Speaker; 3514	Wagner; 3430	Collins; 3314	Musial; 3294	Lajoie; 3252	P Waner; 3152	Anson; 3081	S Rice; 2987	Crawford; 2964	

== 1961–2020 ==
Year	1st	2nd	3rd	4th	5th	6th	7th	8th	9th	10th
1961	Cobb; 4191	Speaker; 3514	Wagner; 3430	Musial; 3401	Collins; 3314	Lajoie; 3252	P Waner; 3152	Anson; 3081	S Rice; 2987	Crawford; 2964
1962	Cobb; 4191	Musial; 3544	Speaker; 3514	Wagner; 3430	Collins; 3314	Lajoie; 3252	P Waner; 3152	Anson; 3081	S Rice; 2987	Crawford; 2964
1963–1969	Cobb; 4191	Musial; 3630	Speaker; 3514	Wagner; 3430	Collins; 3314	Lajoie; 3252	P Waner; 3152	Anson; 3081	S Rice; 2987	Crawford; 2964
1970	Cobb; 4191	Musial; 3630	Speaker; 3514	Wagner; 3430	Collins; 3314	Lajoie; 3252	P Waner; 3152	Aaron; 3110	Anson; 3081	Mays; 3065
1971	Cobb; 4191	Musial; 3630	Speaker; 3514	Wagner; 3430	Collins; 3314	Aaron; 3272	Lajoie; 3252	Mays; 3178	P Waner; 3152	Anson; 3081
1972	Cobb; 4191	Musial; 3630	Speaker; 3514	Wagner; 3430	Aaron; 3391	Collins; 3314	Lajoie; 3252	Mays; 3239	P Waner; 3152	Anson; 3081
1973	Cobb; 4191	Musial; 3630	Speaker; 3514	Aaron; 3509	Wagner; 3430	Collins; 3314	Mays; 3283	Lajoie; 3252	P Waner; 3152	Anson; 3081
1974	Cobb; 4191	Musial; 3630	Aaron; 3600	Speaker; 3514	Wagner; 3430	Collins; 3314	Mays; 3283	Lajoie; 3252	P Waner; 3152	Anson; 3081
1975	Cobb; 4191	Aaron; 3709	Musial; 3630	Speaker; 3514	Wagner; 3430	Collins; 3314	Mays; 3283	Lajoie; 3252	P Waner; 3152	Anson; 3081
1976–1977	Cobb; 4191	Aaron; 3771	Musial; 3630	Speaker; 3514	Wagner; 3430	Collins; 3314	Mays; 3283	Lajoie; 3252	P Waner; 3152	Anson; 3081
1978	Cobb; 4191	Aaron; 3771	Musial; 3630	Speaker; 3514	Wagner; 3430	Collins; 3314	Mays; 3283	Lajoie; 3252	Rose; 3164	P Waner; 3152
1979	Cobb; 4191	Aaron; 3771	Musial; 3630	Speaker; 3514	Wagner; 3430	Rose; 3372	Collins; 3314	Mays; 3283	Lajoie; 3252	P Waner; 3152
1980	Cobb; 4191	Aaron; 3771	Musial; 3630	Rose; 3557	Speaker; 3514	Wagner; 3430	Collins; 3314	Mays; 3283	Lajoie; 3252	P Waner; 3152
1981	Cobb; 4191	Aaron; 3771	Rose; 3697	Musial; 3630	Speaker; 3514	Wagner; 3430	Collins; 3314	Mays; 3283	Lajoie; 3252	Yastrzemski; 3192
1982	Cobb; 4191	Rose; 3869	Aaron; 3771	Musial; 3630	Speaker; 3514	Wagner; 3430	Yastrzemski; 3318	Collins; 3314	Mays; 3283	Lajoie; 3252
1983	Cobb; 4191	Rose; 3990	Aaron; 3771	Musial; 3630	Speaker; 3514	Wagner; 3430	Yastrzemski; 3419	Collins; 3314	Mays; 3283	Lajoie; 3252
1984	Cobb; 4191	Rose; 4097	Aaron; 3771	Musial; 3630	Speaker; 3514	Wagner; 3430	Yastrzemski; 3419	Collins; 3314	Mays; 3283	Lajoie; 3252
1985	Rose; 4204	Cobb; 4191	Aaron; 3771	Musial; 3630	Speaker; 3514	Wagner; 3430	Yastrzemski; 3419	Collins; 3314	Mays; 3283	Lajoie; 3252
1986–1996	Rose; 4256	Cobb; 4191	Aaron; 3771	Musial; 3630	Speaker; 3514	Wagner; 3430	Yastrzemski; 3419	Collins; 3314	Mays; 3283	Lajoie; 3252
1997	Rose; 4256	Cobb; 4191	Aaron; 3771	Musial; 3630	Speaker; 3514	Wagner; 3430	Yastrzemski; 3419	Collins; 3314	Mays; 3283	Murray; 3255
1998–2011	Rose; 4256	Cobb; 4191	Aaron; 3771	Musial; 3630	Speaker; 3514	Wagner; 3430	Yastrzemski; 3419	Molitor; 3319	Collins; 3314	Mays; 3283
2012	Rose; 4256	Cobb; 4191	Aaron; 3771	Musial; 3630	Speaker; 3514	Wagner; 3430	Yastrzemski; 3419	Molitor; 3319	Collins; 3314	Jeter; 3304
2013	Rose; 4256	Cobb; 4191	Aaron; 3771	Musial; 3630	Speaker; 3514	Wagner; 3430	Yastrzemski; 3419	Molitor; 3319	Jeter; 3316	Collins; 3314
2014–2020	Rose; 4256	Cobb; 4191	Aaron; 3771	Musial; 3630	Speaker; 3514	Jeter; 3465	Wagner; 3430	Yastrzemski; 3419	Molitor; 3319	Collins; 3314

== 2021– ==
Year	1st	2nd	3rd	4th	5th	6th	7th	8th	9th	10th
2021	Rose; 4256	Cobb; 4191	Aaron; 3771	Musial; 3630	Speaker; 3514	Jeter; 3465	Wagner; 3430	Yastrzemski; 3419	Molitor; 3319	Collins; 3314
2022-2025	Rose; 4256	Cobb; 4191	Aaron; 3771	Musial; 3630	Speaker; 3514	Jeter; 3465	Wagner; 3430	Yastrzemski; 3419	Pujols; 3384	Molitor; 3319

Active players are marked in bold italics.

Stats as of the end of the 2025 Major League Baseball season.

== See also ==
- List of Major League Baseball hit records
