= 3,000-hit club =

Group of Major League Baseball players to have 3,000 career regular-season hits

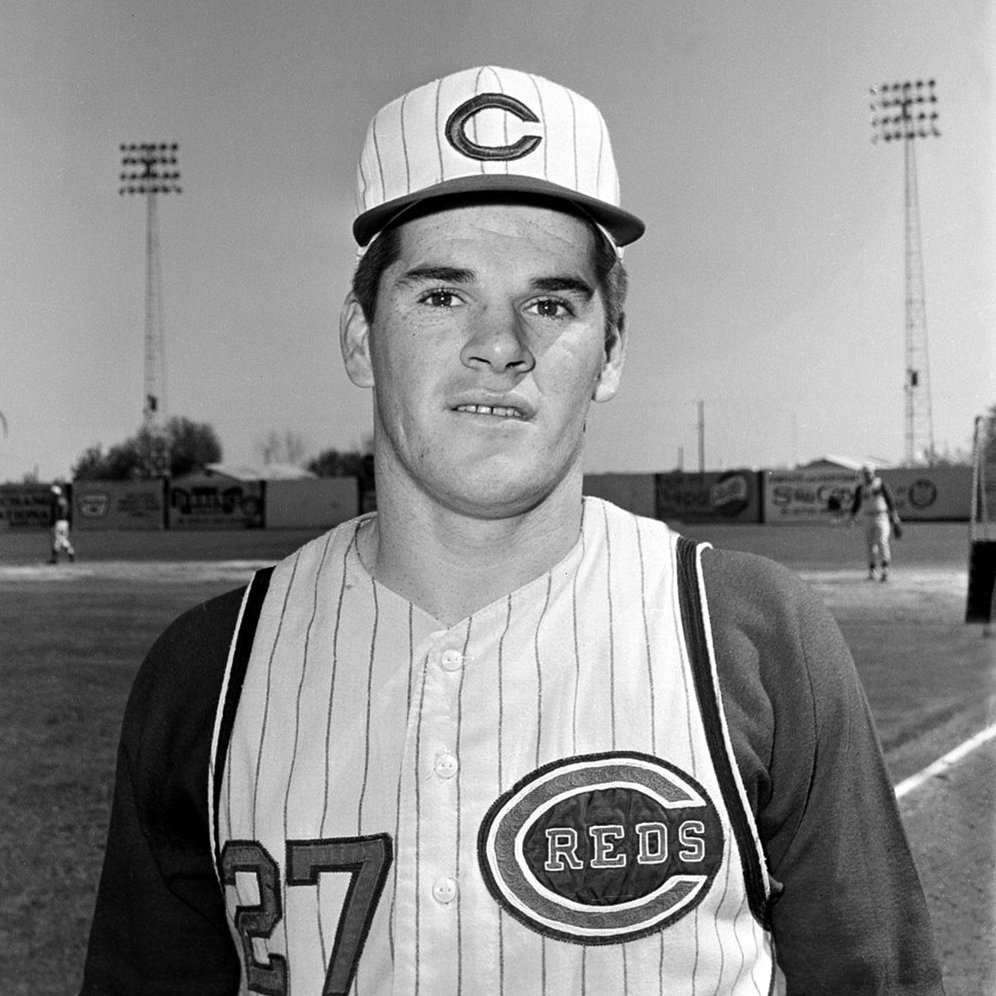
Pete Rose is the all-time MLB hits leader with 4,256 hits.

The 3,000-hit club is the group of 33 batters who have collected 3,000 or more regular-season hits in their careers in Major League Baseball (MLB). Reaching 3,000 hits has been "long considered the greatest measure of superior bat handling" and is often described as a guarantee of eventual entry into the Baseball Hall of Fame.

Cap Anson was the first MLB player to reach 3,000 hits, although his precise career hit total is unclear. (Note: Two major factors have confused Anson's precise hit total. First, a rule which existed for only the 1887 MLB season counted walks as hits. Additionally, Anson played five seasons in the National Association (NA), which is not always recognized as an official "major league". MLB.com credits Anson with 3,011 career hits, not including his time in the NA or his walks in 1887. Baseball-Reference credits him with 3,435 hits, including his time in the NA, not including his walks in 1887, and crediting him with one more hit than MLB.com for his hit total in 1894. The Hall of Fame shows 3,081 hits for Anson, including his walks in 1887 (for a total of 224 hits that season) but not including NA playing time. Elias Sports Bureau also credits him with 3,081 hits. The date listed in this article comes from MLB.com, using their hit totals for Anson.) Two players—Nap Lajoie and Honus Wagner—reached 3,000 hits during the 1914 season. Ty Cobb did so in 1921 and became the first player in MLB history to reach 4,000 hits in 1927, ultimately finishing his career with 4,189. (Note: MLB.com and the Hall of Fame credit Cobb with 4,191 hits, while Baseball-Reference lists 4,189; the discrepancy is due to a double-counted 1910 game in which Cobb was credited with 2 hits, which was first discovered in 1978 and reported on in 1981.) Pete Rose, the current hit leader, became the second player to reach 4,000 hits on April 13, 1984, and surpassed Cobb in September 1985, finishing his career with 4,256. Roberto Clemente's career ended with precisely 3,000 hits, which he reached in the last at bat of his career on September 30, 1972. (Note: This was not Clemente's last appearance in a game, however, as he entered the following game as a defensive substitution and did not bat. Clemente died during the offseason on December 31, 1972.)

Of the 33 members, 18 were right-handed batters, 13 were left-handed, and two were switch hitters. The Cleveland Guardians and Detroit Tigers are the only franchises to have three players reach 3,000 hits while on their roster: for Cleveland, Lajoie, while the team was the Naps, Tris Speaker, and most recently Eddie Murray, both when the franchise was known as the Indians, and, for the Tigers, Cobb, Al Kaline, and most recently Miguel Cabrera. Ten of these players have played for only one major league team. Seven players—Hank Aaron, Willie Mays, Murray, Rafael Palmeiro, Albert Pujols, Alex Rodriguez, and Cabrera—are also members of the 500 home run club. Cobb holds the highest career batting average at .366, while Cal Ripken Jr. holds the lowest at .276. Wade Boggs, Derek Jeter, and Rodriguez are the only players to hit a home run for their 3,000th hit, and Paul Molitor and Ichiro Suzuki are the only players to hit a triple for their 3,000th; all others hit a single or double. Stan Musial is the first and so far only player to collect his 3,000th hit as a pinch-hitter. Craig Biggio is the only player to be thrown out for his 3,000th hit, while attempting to stretch the hit into a double. Biggio and Jeter are the only players whose 3,000th hit came in a game where they had five hits; Jeter reached base safely in all of his at bats. There has only been a single game in which two members of the club were teammates while members of the club; Rickey Henderson of the San Diego Padres collected his 3,000th hit on October 7th, 2001, the final day of his teammate and fellow club member Tony Gwynn's career. The most recent player to reach 3,000 hits is Cabrera, who did so on April 23, 2022, while playing for the Detroit Tigers; since his retirement at the end of the 2023 season, there have been no active members of the club.

All eligible players with 3,000 or more career hits have been elected to the Hall except Palmeiro and Rodriguez, whose careers have been tainted by links to performance-enhancing drugs, and since 1962 all except Biggio were elected on the first ballot. Rose was ineligible for the Hall of Fame because he was banned from baseball in 1989, but in 2025 commissioner Rob Manfred reinstated all players on the permanently ineligible list who had died. He will be eligible for selection by the Classic Baseball Era subcommittee of the Veterans Committee at their next meeting, in December 2027. After four years on the ballot, Palmeiro failed to be named on 5% of ballots in 2014, after which his name was removed from the Baseball Writers' Association of America ballots, although it is possible that the Veterans Committee could select him. Rodriguez garnered 34.3% of the vote during his first year of eligibility in 2022. Pujols and Cabrera will not be eligible until 2028 and 2029, respectively, as a player must be retired for 5 years or have been dead for 6 months to be considered for the Hall of Fame. Twenty-one different teams have had a player reach 3,000 hits.

== Key ==
Cap Anson reached 3,000 hits on July 18, 1897. He was the first, and, as of 2022, the oldest player to reach the mark.

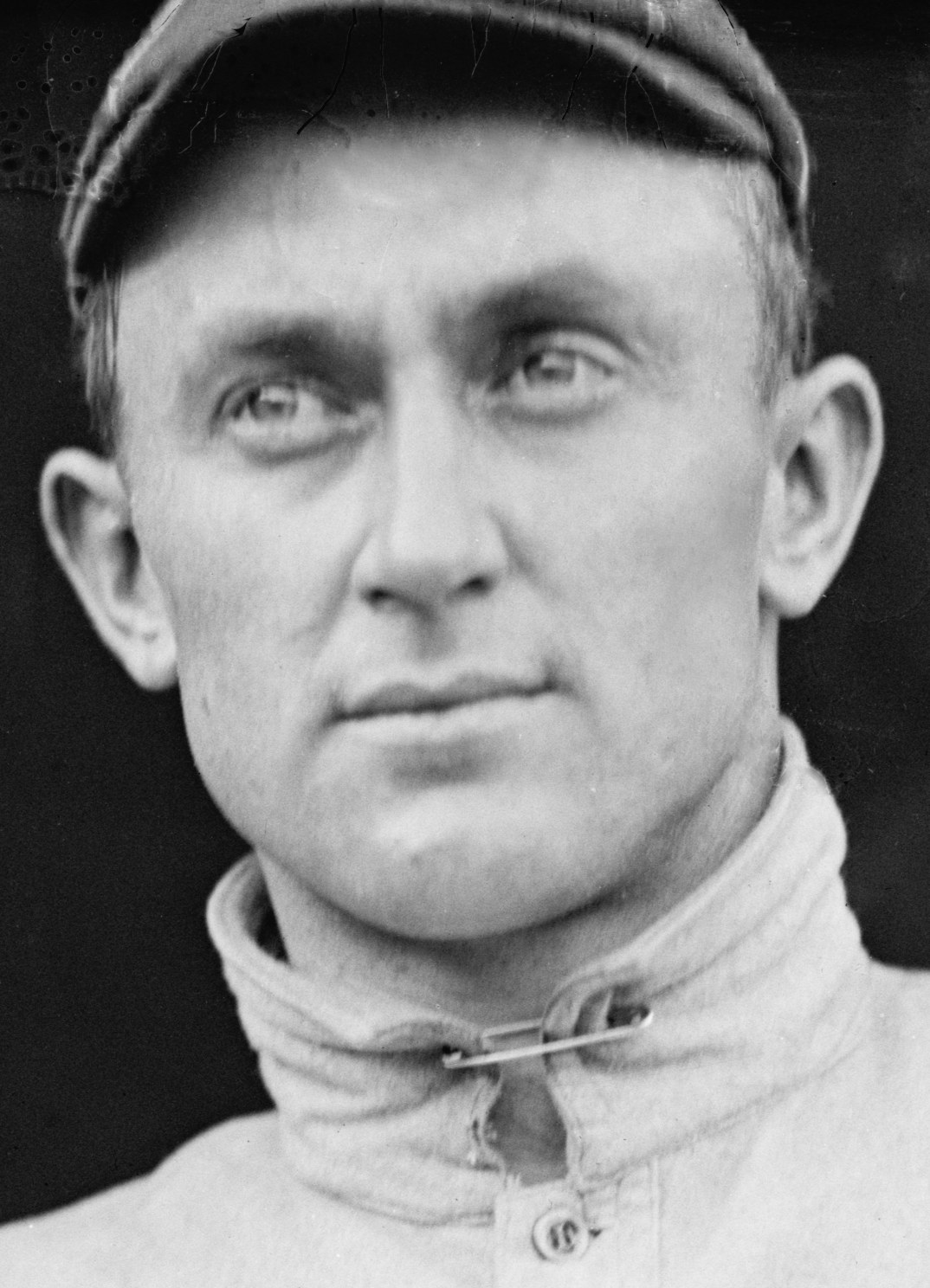
In 1927, Ty Cobb became the first player to collect 4,000 hits. He remains the youngest player to reach 3,000 hits, doing so at the age of 34. He also achieved 3,000 hits in the fewest games played (2,135).

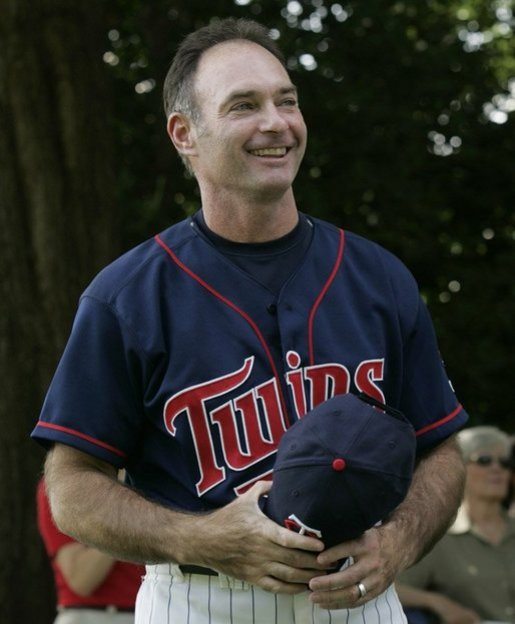
Paul Molitor was the first to triple for his 3,000th hit.

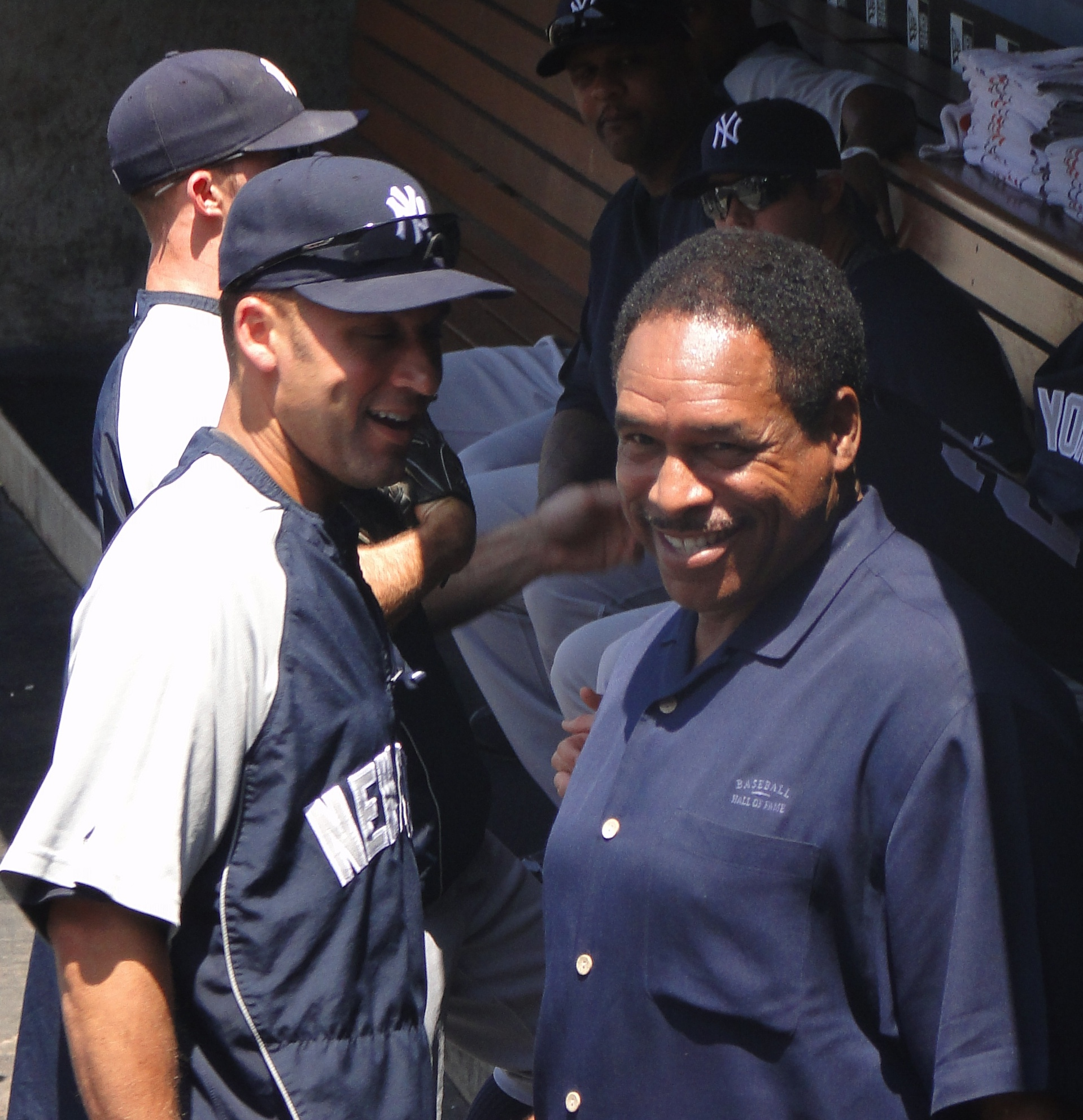
Derek Jeter (left) and Dave Winfield (right) are both members.

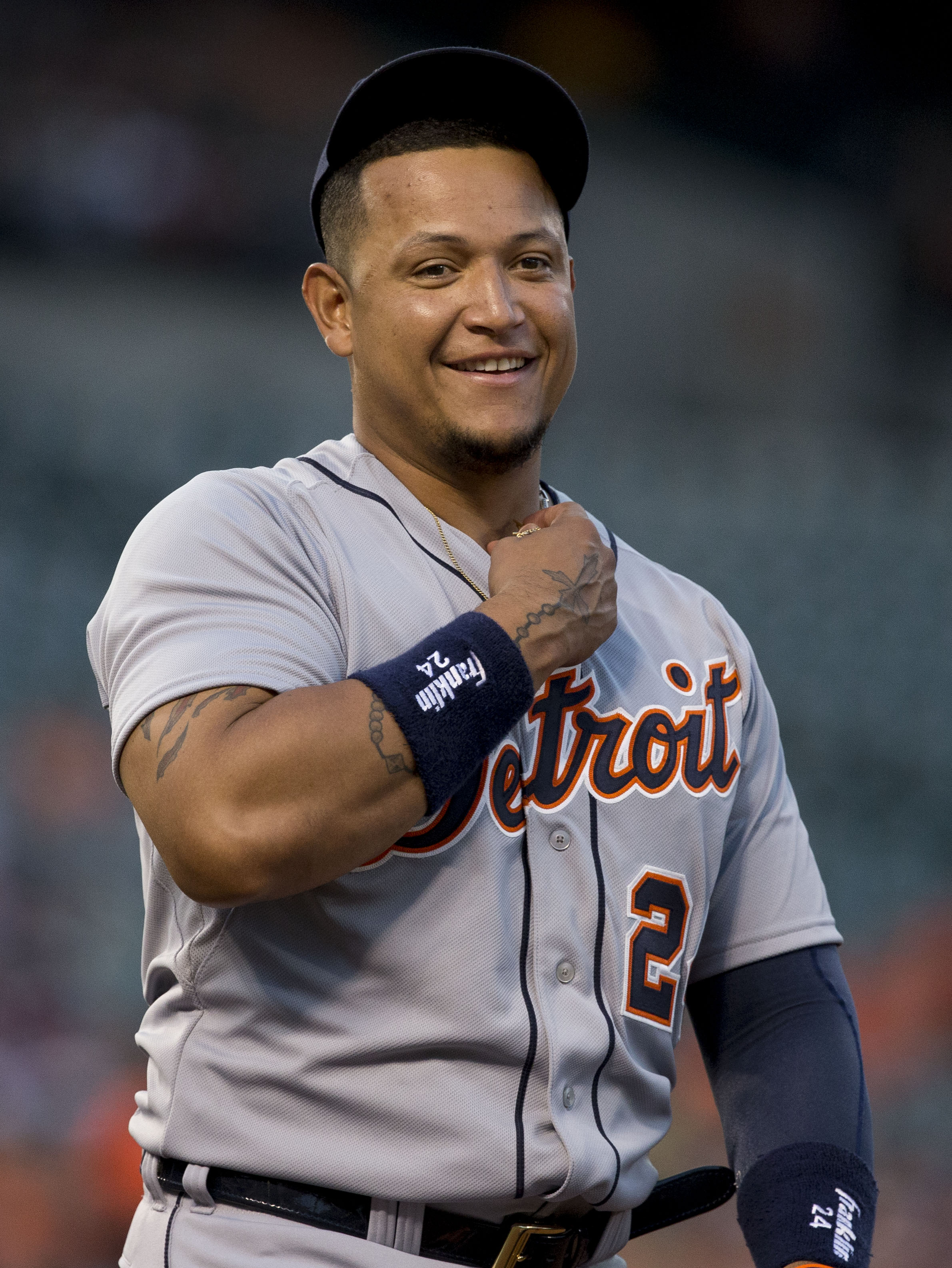
Miguel Cabrera, joining on April 23, 2022, is the most recent addition to the club.

Player	Name of the player
Hits	Career hits
Average	Career batting average
Date	Date of the player's 3,000th hit
Team	The batter's team for his 3,000th hit
Seasons	The seasons this player played in the major leagues
3,000th hit	The type of hit the batter recorded for his 3,000th hit
*	Elected to the Baseball Hall of Fame
‡	Player is active
†	Also hit 500 home runs

== Members ==
Statistics updated as of March 25, 2026.

Player	Hits	Average	Date	Team	Seasons	3,000th hit	Ref
Pete Rose (Note: Due to betting on games while managing an MLB team, Pete Rose received a permanent ban from baseball and only became eligible for selection to the Baseball Hall of Fame in 2025.)	4,256	.303	May 5, 1978	Cincinnati Reds	1963–1986	Single	
Ty Cobb*	4,189	.366	August 19, 1921	Detroit Tigers	1905–1928	Single	
Hank Aaron^{†}*	3,771	.305	May 17, 1970	Atlanta Braves	1954–1976	Single	
Stan Musial*	3,630	.331	May 13, 1958	St. Louis Cardinals	1941–1944, 1946–1963	Double	
Tris Speaker*	3,514	.345	May 17, 1925	Cleveland Indians	1907–1928	Single	
Derek Jeter*	3,465	.310	July 9, 2011	New York Yankees	1995–2014	Home run	
Honus Wagner*	3,430	.329	June 9, 1914	Pittsburgh Pirates	1897–1917	Double	
Carl Yastrzemski*	3,419	.285	September 12, 1979	Boston Red Sox	1961–1983	Single	
Albert Pujols^{†}	3,384	.296	May 4, 2018	Los Angeles Angels	2001–2022	Single	
Paul Molitor*	3,319	.306	September 16, 1996	Minnesota Twins	1978–1998	Triple	
Eddie Collins*	3,315	.333	June 3, 1925	Chicago White Sox	1906–1930	Single	
Willie Mays^{†}*	3,293	.301	July 18, 1970	San Francisco Giants	1948, 1951–1952, 1954–1973	Single	
Eddie Murray^{†}*	3,255	.287	June 30, 1995	Cleveland Indians	1977–1997	Single	
Nap Lajoie*	3,252 (Note: MLB.com credits Lajoie with 3,252 hits, while Baseball-Reference lists 3,243. The discrepancy is due to a transcription error for Lajoie's hit total in 1901, 229, which until 1954 was inaccurately recorded as 220.)	.339	September 27, 1914	Cleveland Naps	1896–1916	Double	
Cal Ripken Jr.*	3,184	.276	April 15, 2000	Baltimore Orioles	1981–2001	Single	
Miguel Cabrera^{†}	3,174	.307	April 23, 2022	Detroit Tigers	2003–2023	Single	
Adrián Beltré*	3,166	.286	July 30, 2017	Texas Rangers	1998–2018	Double	
George Brett*	3,154	.305	September 30, 1992	Kansas City Royals	1973–1993	Single	
Paul Waner*	3,152	.333	June 19, 1942	Boston Braves	1926–1945	Single	
Robin Yount*	3,142	.285	September 9, 1992	Milwaukee Brewers	1974–1993	Single	
Tony Gwynn*	3,141	.338	August 6, 1999	San Diego Padres	1982–2001	Single	
Alex Rodriguez^{†}	3,115	.295	June 19, 2015	New York Yankees	1994–2013, 2015–2016	Home run	
Dave Winfield*	3,110	.283	September 16, 1993	Minnesota Twins	1973–1995	Single	
Ichiro Suzuki*	3,089	.311	August 7, 2016	Miami Marlins	2001–2019	Triple	
Craig Biggio*	3,060	.281	June 28, 2007	Houston Astros	1988–2007	Single (Note: Biggio was thrown out trying to stretch his single into a double.)	
Rickey Henderson*	3,055	.279	October 7, 2001	San Diego Padres	1979–2003	Double	
Rod Carew*	3,053	.328	August 4, 1985	California Angels	1967–1985	Single	
Lou Brock*	3,023	.293	August 13, 1979	St. Louis Cardinals	1961–1979	Single	
Rafael Palmeiro^{†}	3,020	.288	July 15, 2005	Baltimore Orioles	1986–2005	Double	
Cap Anson*	3,011	.331	July 18, 1897	Chicago Colts	1871–1897	Single	
Wade Boggs*	3,010	.328	August 7, 1999	Tampa Bay Devil Rays	1982–1999	Home run	
Al Kaline*	3,007	.297	September 24, 1974	Detroit Tigers	1953–1974	Double	
Roberto Clemente*	3,000	.317	September 30, 1972	Pittsburgh Pirates	1955–1972	Double	

== See also ==
- List of lifetime Major League Baseball hit leaders through history
- List of Major League Baseball hit records
- List of Major League Baseball career hits leaders
- Mr. 3000
- Chasing 3000
- 500 home run club
