= Samuel Weaver =

Samuel Weaver may refer to:

- Samuel Weaver (footballer)
- Samuel Weaver (Ruby Ridge)
- Samuel Weaver (baseball)
