= Alamazoo Jennings =

American baseball player and umpire (1850–1894)

- Catcher/Umpire
- Born: November 30, 1850; Newport, Kentucky, U.S.
- Died: November 2, 1894 (aged 43); Cincinnati, Ohio, U.S.
- Batted: Unknown Threw: Unknown

MLB debut
- August 15, 1878, for the Milwaukee Grays

Last MLB appearance
- August 15, 1878, for the Milwaukee Grays

MLB statistics
- At-bats: 2
- Batting average: .000
- Walks: 1
- Stats at Baseball Reference

Teams
- Milwaukee Grays (1878)

Alfred Gorden "Alamazoo" Jennings (November 30, 1850 – November 2, 1894) was an American professional baseball player who played in one Major League Baseball (MLB) game as a catcher for the Milwaukee Grays on August 15, 1878. In addition to his time as a player, he later became an umpire in both the major and minor leagues.

It was during his one game for the Grays, that he is most remembered. He committed four errors, and allowed ten passed balls. His performance earned him his nickname of Alamazoo by sportswriter O. P. Caylor, with which he was referred to for the remainder of his life. Although he was born in Kentucky, he grew up in Cincinnati, and worked in various trades during times that didn't involve baseball games. Among these were as a laborer, driver, and a police officer. When he left baseball, he began an owner operated roasted corn business in Cincinnati, that was later expanded into Kentucky. He died at the age of 43 in 1894.

== Early life ==
Alfred Gorden Jennings was born in Newport, Kentucky on November 30, 1850, but grew up in Cincinnati, Ohio. His father was not around during his life, and his mother (whose name is only described as L. A.) had remarried a man named Snead by 1860, but was not living with him by the 1860 United States Census. Jennings began playing for local baseball clubs in 1868, first for the Red Oaks, and later for the Cincinnati Buckeyes.

By 1870, he was living with his brother John, and had listed his occupation as a corn laborer. On December 24, 1871, he married Letitia Booth in Henry County, Kentucky. Throughout the 1870s, he living in various addresses, and worked one time as an expressman. In the 1880 census, he was again living with his mother, and both were categorized as widows/widowers, and his occupation was listed as a farmer.

== Major-league career ==
In 1878, he was managing a baseball club in Delaware, Ohio, when the Milwaukee Grays of the National League visited the Cincinnati Reds on August 15. The Grays had a tough time filling all their playing positions due to multiple injuries, and enlisted Jennings to catch pitcher Mike Golden. During the game, he failed to collect a hit in three plate appearances, but did receive one base on balls. Defensively, however, he was officially charged with four errors, and 10 passed balls. Milwaukee lost the game to Cincinnati 13–2. It was this performance that prompted sportswriter O. P. Caylor to give him his nickname of "Alamazoo". About his one game at the major league level, Jennings stated:

We were all mixed with our signs...I signed for an outcurve, and got an inshoot which broke a couple of fingers. 'Go ahead' I said, 'I'll stay here all day even if I have to stop them with my elbows! You can't drive me away!'.

The 10 passed balls set a record for catchers until Alex Gardner had 12 in a game on May 10, 1884, also his only game at the major league level. On why Jennings, with little to no playing experience, was called upon to catch the hard-throwing Golden, Caylor stated:

He looked so large and handsome, so very like a catcher...that Manager Chapman was mashed, and straightway engaged him, and clinched the bargain with a dinner.

He endured his nickname for the remainder of his career, and sportswriters exaggerated his dismal performance more in the years afterward. He was also forced into retelling his experience many times in his life. In reading what Caylor had written, Jennings admitted:

I read a few lines and wanted to fight. I read a few lines more and had to laugh.

== Umpiring career ==
The first game Jennings worked occurred in minor league baseball, when, in 1878, he was unable to play due to a broken thumb. He began working as a major league umpire in 1882, when he worked two American Association games that were played locally in Cincinnati. Later, in 1884, he was assigned to work Northwestern League games in Ft. Wayne, Indiana to replace Charlie Cushman who had been injured by a stone thrown by an 11-year-old boy, who he had ejected from the stands earlier in the game.

His work varied in 1884. In addition to minor league games, he was also picked to call an AA game on August 10, and in September, he was hired by the Union Association to work the remainder of their season. He was used in Baltimore, Washington D. C., and Cincinnati. For the 1885, he was hired by the Southern League, and he worked three AA games as well. He appeared in major league games infrequently over the next few years, calling 11 AA games in 1887, and one game each in 1889 and 1891.

== Non-baseball life ==
When not playing or umpiring, Jennings lived and worked in various places within his hometown of Cincinnati. Among those were as a driver and a watchman from 1881 to 1882 while residing at 65 Allison. He later moved to 458 Main St, then became a Cincinnati police officer by 1887. He was still listed as a police officer through 1891, and living at both 458 and 562 Main St.

It was during this period of his life that he owned a roasted corn delivery business, first in Cincinnati, and quickly expanded it into Covington, Kentucky, and his birth city of Newport. In 1893, he was listed as a peddler, but by 1894, he was listed as a laborer. Jennings died in Cincinnati, at the age of 43, as a result of a surgical operation. He is interred at Evergreen Cemetery in Southgate, Kentucky.
