= Jimmy Ryan (baseball) =

American baseball player (1863–1923)

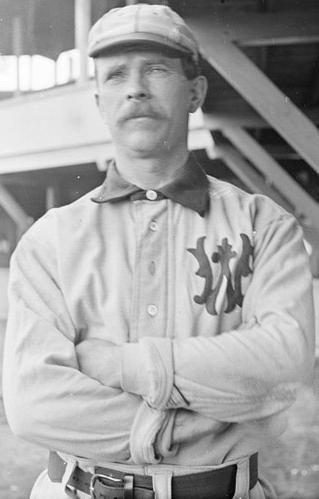
- Ryan in 1903
- Outfielder
- Born: February 11, 1863; Clinton, Massachusetts, U.S.
- Died: October 29, 1923 (aged 60); Chicago, Illinois, U.S.
- Batted: Right Threw: Left

MLB debut
- October 8, 1885, for the Chicago White Stockings

Last MLB appearance
- September 24, 1903, for the Washington Senators

MLB statistics
- Batting average: .308
- Hits: 2,513
- Home runs: 118
- Runs batted in: 1,093
- Stats at Baseball Reference

Teams
- Chicago White Stockings (1885–1889); Chicago Pirates (1890); Chicago Colts / Orphans (1891–1900); Washington Senators (1902–1903)

Career highlights and awards
- NL home run leader (1888); Chicago Cubs Hall of Fame

James Edward Ryan (February 11, 1863 – October 29, 1923), nicknamed "Pony", was an American center fielder in Major League Baseball (MLB) who played between 1885 and 1903, primarily for the Chicago White Stockings / Colts / Orphans. He batted .300 eleven times, retiring with a career average of .308, and was the seventh player to hit 100 career home runs. Ryan set major league records for career games (1,945) and assists (375) as an outfielder that were later broken by Jesse Burkett and Tris Speaker respectively. He also ended his career ranking second in putouts (3,701) and fourth in double plays (71). He was sixth all-time in hits for all major league players when he retired (four Hall of Famers were ahead of him).

== Baseball career ==
A native of Clinton, Massachusetts, Ryan started his major league career with Chicago of the National League (NL) in 1885. He played for the team until 1900, except for the 1890 season when he played for the Chicago Pirates of the Players' League.

Ryan had his best season in 1888, leading the NL in hits (182), doubles (33), home runs (16), total bases (283), and slugging percentage (.515). He was also second in batting average (.332), extra-base hits (59) and runs scored (115). During that season, Ryan hit for the cycle on July 28. He also appeared in that game as a pitcher, becoming the first player in major league history to hit for the cycle and pitch in the same game. The White Stockings beat the Detroit Wolverines, 21–17.

Ryan was the most severely injured player when the Chicago team was involved in a train wreck at Lindsey, Ohio on August 6, 1893 when their sleeper cars derailed and crashed into a freight train that was stopped on a siding, resulting in three fatalities. Ryan's legs were shattered, and for weeks there were doubts that he would even be able to walk again, resulting in a $10,000 settlement from the Lake Shore and Michigan Southern Railway. As late as the following January, it was still considered unlikely that he would be able to resume his career, but he returned to post a career-high .357 batting average. Almost exactly one year after the wreck, on August 5, 1894, Ryan and teammate Walt Wilmot were credited with saving hundreds of lives when a fire broke out in the stands at West Side Park; the two players used bats to break down barbed-wire fencing, allowing fans to escape onto the field.

In 1900, Ryan broke Tom Brown's career record of 348 assists by an outfielder. Ryan finished his career with 375 assists. He held the record until Tris Speaker broke it in 1924. He served as player-manager of the St. Paul Saints of the Class A Western League in 1901. He returned in 1902 to play two more seasons. Ryan ended his major league career with the Washington Senators of the American League in 1902–1903. From 1898 to 1910, Ryan was top ten in hits all-time.

== Career statistics ==
He was a career .308 hitter with 118 home runs and 1,093 runs batted in in 2,014 games. As a pitcher, he compiled a 6–1 record with a 3.62 earned run average and 43 strikeouts in 117 innings pitched. Ryan is 36th in runs scored, with him being 7th among 19th century players; the six ahead of him are each in the Baseball Hall of Fame.

== Player profile ==
On the tough side, Ryan was one of the few players to punch a reporter at least twice. After his first episode, in 1887, Charlie Seymour of the Chicago Herald wrote, "Ryan slugged the magnificent Chicago reporter in Pittsburg[h] the other day." In the other, in 1892, he took exception to George Beachel of the Chicago Daily News. In the clubhouse after a game, Ryan "picked a quarrel with [Beachel], and then attacked him, using him up pretty badly. No arrests have been made." In 1896, he punched a train conductor after losing his place and his teammates had gone to bed. A conductor who intervened was "called down by Mr. Ryan, who got in one upper cut before [his longtime-captain manager Cap] Anson stopped the fun," wrote Tim Murnane of the Boston Globe.

In the 2001 book The New Bill James Historical Baseball Abstract, writer Bill James ranked Ryan as the 26th greatest center fielder of all time.

== Personal life and death ==
Ryan died in Chicago at age 60. He was married twice and left no children. He was buried in an unmarked grave until 2022 until the help of the SABR Grave Marker Project helped efforts to lend a proper gravestone.

== See also ==
- List of Major League Baseball career hits leaders
- List of Major League Baseball career triples leaders
- List of Major League Baseball career runs scored leaders
- List of Major League Baseball career runs batted in leaders
- List of Major League Baseball career stolen bases leaders
- List of Major League Baseball annual doubles leaders
- List of Major League Baseball annual home run leaders
- List of Major League Baseball players to hit for the cycle

Achievements
Preceded by Sam Barkley; Farmer Weaver	Hitting for the cycle July 28, 1888; July 1, 1891	Succeeded by Mike Tiernan; Abner Dalrymple
