= Bill Holbert =

American baseball player (1855–1935)

- Catcher
- Born: March 14, 1855; Baltimore, Maryland, U.S.
- Died: March 20, 1935 (aged 80); Laurel, Maryland, U.S.
- Batted: Right Threw: Right

MLB debut
- September 5, 1876, for the Louisville Grays

Last MLB appearance
- July 12, 1888, for the Brooklyn Bridegrooms

MLB statistics
- Batting average: .208
- Home runs: 0
- Runs batted in: 144
- Stats at Baseball Reference

Teams
- Louisville Grays (1876); Milwaukee Grays (1878); Syracuse Stars (1879); Troy Trojans (1879–1882); New York Metropolitans (1883–1887); Brooklyn Bridegrooms (1888)

William Henry Holbert (March 14, 1855 – March 20, 1935) was an American catcher in the National League and American Association baseball leagues, from 1876 through 1888. He holds the Major League record for career at-bats without a home run, failing to do so in his 2,335 at-bats. However, he was playing in an era when triples were more common than home runs, due to the spacious parks and poor quality of the balls used.

Bill Holbert started his career with the nascent Louisville Grays of 1876. He sat out the 1877 year and, in 1878, played for the Milwaukee Grays, followed by the Syracuse Stars, and the Troy Trojans (both in 1879). Holbert is also credited with managing one game, a loss, in 1879 while with the Syracuse Stars.

He stayed with the Trojans, and the National League, until 1883, when he joined the New York Metropolitans of the new American Association. The Metropolitans traded him to the Brooklyn Bridegrooms after the 1887 season. Bill Holbert retired in 1888, playing just 15 games with the Bridegrooms that year.

When the new Players' League started up in 1890, Holbert was one of the original umpires.

== Major league career ==
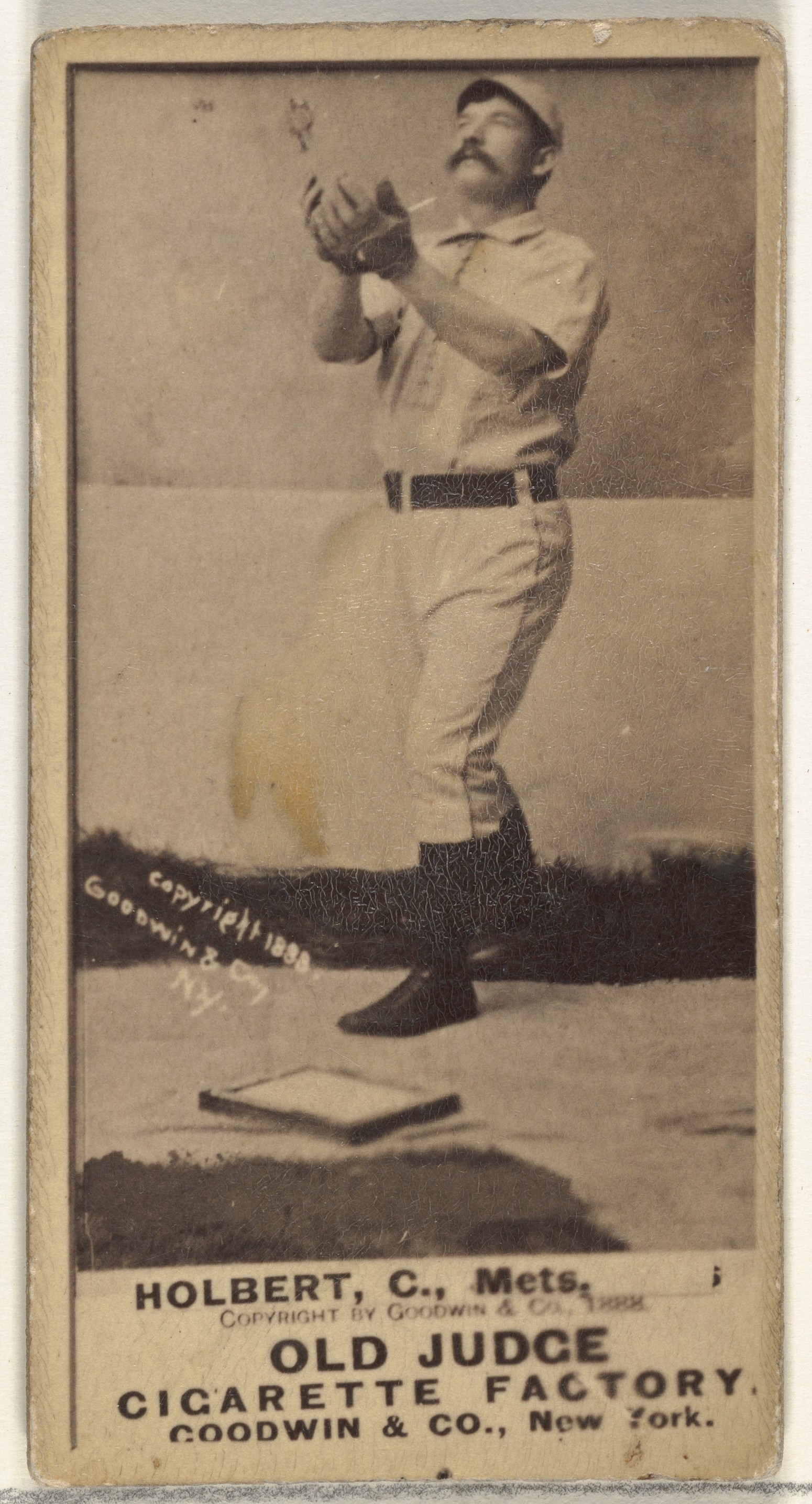
Bill Holbert, 1888, New York Metropolitans

Bill Holbert's career batting average was a weak .208, with a slugging average at a very low .237. Although batting averages were generally low in the 19th century and more so for catchers, Holbert's was lower than the average. The 1879 Syracuse Stars, for example, had a team average of only .227, while Holbert hit .201. Holbert's best year was 1881, with Troy, when he hit .278. Even that year, nearly all – 46 out of 49 – of his hits were singles, and his on-base percentage was a mediocre .284.

Nonetheless, he was considered a good defensive catcher, although these talents have been overshadowed by those of Buck Ewing, considered by most to be best catcher of the 19th century. When not catching, Holbert would often play the outfield; he started 11% of his games there.

== See also ==
- List of Major League Baseball player–managers

== Notes ==
Preceded by Mike Dorgan	Syracuse Stars Managers; 1879	Succeeded by Jimmy Macullar
