= Frank Bliss =

American baseball player (1852–1929)

- Catcher
- Born: December 10, 1852; Chicago, Illinois
- Died: January 9, 1929 (aged 76); Nashville, Tennessee
- Batted: Unknown Threw: Unknown

MLB debut
- June 20, 1878, for the Milwaukee Grays

Last MLB appearance
- 1878, for the Milwaukee Grays

MLB statistics
- Batting average: .125
- Home runs: 0
- Runs scored: 1
- Stats at Baseball Reference

Teams
- Milwaukee Grays (1878)

Frank Eugene Bliss (December 10, 1852 – January 9, 1929) was an American baseball player. He played college baseball at the University of Michigan from 1869 to 1873 and played for the Milwaukee Grays in Major League Baseball during the 1878 season.

== Early years ==
Bliss was born in Chicago, Illinois, in 1852. He moved with his parents, Edwin J. Bliss (a carpenter and later contractor) and Mary Tuttle (Osborn) Bliss, to Ann Arbor, Michigan at age five and attended the public schools in Ann Arbor, graduating from high school in 1869.

== University of Michigan ==
Bliss enrolled at the University of Michigan as a civil engineering student in 1869. He played college baseball there as a catcher from 1869 to 1873. Teammate Frederick Stearns said of Bliss: "He was a wonder. Besides being a great catcher, he had the unusual distinction of always playing with his trousers tucked in long boots." Baseball historian Peter Morris has cited Bliss's use of long boots as an early innovation of protective gear for catchers, i.e., an early form of shin guards.

Bliss graduated from the University of Michigan in June 1873 with a degree in civil engineering. Bliss worked as a civil engineer from 1873 to 1875 in Cleveland, Pittsburgh, and Detroit. In the fall of 1877, he returned to the University of Michigan as a student in the law department and received an LL.B. degree in the spring of 1879.

== Professional baseball ==
In 1876, Bliss was the catcher and team captain on the West End Club in Milwaukee, Wisconsin. An account of the 1876 West Enders noted that Bliss was a fine catcher "with great skill and nerve and throws to the bases with notable accuracy." The 1876 West Enders played seven games against teams from the National League. After the 1876 season, Bliss sued the West End Club claiming that the team had agreed to pay him $1,300 but paid him less than $300. No record has been found of the lawsuit's outcome.

During the summer of 1877, Bliss played for minor league teams in Janesville, Wisconsin, and Buffalo, New York.

In June 1878, the Milwaukee Grays lost their catchers to injuries and signed Bliss. Bliss was a law student at Michigan at the time, but he left school to join the Grays. Bliss made his Major League Baseball debut on June 20, 1878, as the battery mate to pitcher Mike Golden. Bliss was responsible for seven errors, including six passed balls, in the game. Two days later, he appeared in his second and final game for the Grays, this time as a third baseman. In two games for the Grays, Bliss had one hit and scored one run in eight at bats and compiled a .125 batting average.

Bliss was the first Michigan Wolverines baseball player to play in Major League Baseball.

== Later years ==
Bliss was admitted to the Michigan bar in 1879. He began practicing law in Cleveland with the Herrick & Herrick firm. In 1881, he married Louisa Sarah Fish and moved to Brooklyn, Ohio. He continued to practice law in Cleveland. He served for several years as a member of Brooklyn's village council and was elected mayor of Brooklyn Village in 1888. Bliss and his wife Louisa had four children, Frank Bronson Bliss (b. 1883), Carl Edwin Bliss (b. 1885), Eugene Frederick Bliss (b. 1887) and Louise Mary Bliss (b. 1889).

Bliss died of pneumonia, with influenza a contributing cause, in January 1929 at Nashville, Tennessee.
