= Eclipse Park (Milwaukee) =

Former baseball ground in Wisconsin, US

- Milwaukee Base-Ball Grounds
- Interactive map of Eclipse Park
- Location: Milwaukee, Wisconsin
- Coordinates: 43°02′12″N 87°55′30″W
- Surface: Grass

Tenant
- Milwaukee Grays (NL) (1878)

Eclipse Park, also known as Milwaukee Base-Ball Grounds, is a former baseball ground located in Milwaukee, Wisconsin, USA. The ground was home to the Milwaukee Grays of the National League during the 1878 season. The first game was played on May 14 and the last on September 14.

The ballpark was on the block bounded by West Clybourn Street, West Michigan Street, North Tenth Street, and North Eleventh Street. Like another baseball stadium which succeeded it in Milwaukee, Borchert Field, the ballpark's site now contains Interstate 43, along with the northern quadrant of the Marquette Interchange.

== See also ==
- List of baseball parks in Milwaukee

== Sources ==
- Michael Benson, Baseball Parks of North America, McFarland, 1989.
