= Billy Redmond =

American baseball player (1853–1894)

- Shortstop
- Born: 1853; St. Louis, Missouri
- Died: April 3, 1894 (aged 40–41); St. Louis, Missouri
- Batted: Left Threw: Left

MLB debut
- May 4, 1875, for the St. Louis Red Stockings

Last MLB appearance
- 1878, for the Milwaukee Grays

MLB statistics
- Batting average: .221
- Home runs: 0
- RBI: 25
- Stats at Baseball Reference

Teams
- St. Louis Red Stockings (1875); Cincinnati Reds (1877); Milwaukee Grays (1878)

William T. Redmond (1853–1894) was an American professional baseball shortstop. He played in the National Association with the St. Louis Red Stockings (1875). He played part of the 1877 season with the Cincinnati Reds of the National League between stints in the League Alliance. He played for the NL's Milwaukee Grays in 1878, then with the Rockford White Stockings of the Northwestern League in 1879.
