= Will Foley (baseball) =

American baseball player (1855–1916)

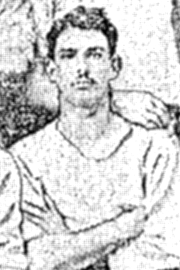
- Third baseman
- Born: November 15, 1855; Chicago, Illinois, U.S.
- Died: November 12, 1916 (aged 60); Chicago, Illinois, U.S.
- Batted: Right Threw: Right

MLB debut
- August 23, 1875, for the Chicago White Stockings

Last MLB appearance
- May 22, 1884, for the Chicago Browns/Pittsburgh Stogies

MLB statistics
- Batting average: .228
- Home runs: 0
- Runs scored: 112

Teams
- Chicago White Stockings (1875); Cincinnati Reds (1876–1877); Milwaukee Grays (1878); Cincinnati Reds (1879); Detroit Wolverines (1881); Chicago Browns/Pittsburgh Stogies (1884)

William Brown Foley (November 15, 1855 – November 12, 1916) was an American Major League Baseball third baseman. He played all or part of seven seasons in the majors, playing for five different teams in three different leagues. His career began in the National Association in 1875 with the Chicago White Stockings, and ended in the Union Association in 1884 with the Chicago Browns/Pittsburgh Stogies. From 1876 until 1879, he was the starting third baseman for the Cincinnati Reds and Milwaukee Grays.

== Sources ==
- Career statistics from Baseball Reference · Baseball Reference (Minors)
