= Jake Goodman (baseball) =

American baseball player (1853–1890)

- First baseman
- Born: September 14, 1853; Lancaster, Pennsylvania, U.S.
- Died: March 9, 1890 (aged 36); Reading, Pennsylvania, U.S.
- Batted: Unknown Threw: Unknown

MLB debut
- May 2, 1878, for the Milwaukee Grays

Last MLB appearance
- May 20, 1882, for the Pittsburgh Alleghenys

MLB statistics
- Batting average: .256
- Home runs: 1
- Runs scored: 33
- Stats at Baseball Reference

Teams
- Milwaukee Grays (1878); Pittsburgh Alleghenys (1882)

Jacob Goodman (September 14, 1853 – March 9, 1890) was an American Major League Baseball player who played for the 1877 Pittsburgh Allegheny, 1878 Milwaukee Grays and the 1882 Pittsburgh Alleghenys.

While playing in the minor leagues in 1884, Goodman was beaned by a pitch. After the head trauma, he became mentally unbalanced and suffered from palsy, ending his baseball career. He died of complications related to his injury at the age of 36, on March 6, 1890. He was Jewish.
