= Paul Waner =

American baseball player (1903–1965)

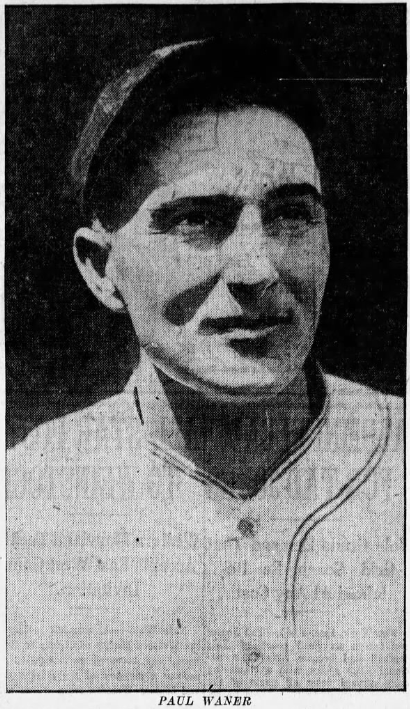
- Waner with the Pittsburgh Pirates, c. 1927
- Right fielder
- Born: April 16, 1903; Harrah, Oklahoma, U.S.
- Died: August 29, 1965 (aged 62); Sarasota, Florida, U.S.
- Batted: Left Threw: Left

MLB debut
- April 13, 1926, for the Pittsburgh Pirates

Last MLB appearance
- April 26, 1945, for the New York Yankees

MLB statistics
- Batting average: .333
- Hits: 3,152
- Home runs: 113
- Runs batted in: 1,309
- Stats at Baseball Reference

Teams
- Pittsburgh Pirates (1926–1940); Brooklyn Dodgers (1941); Boston Braves (1941–1942); Brooklyn Dodgers (1943–1944); New York Yankees (1944–1945)

Career highlights and awards
- 4× All-Star (1933–1935, 1937); NL MVP (1927); 3× NL batting champion (1927, 1934, 1936); NL RBI leader (1927); Pittsburgh Pirates No. 11 retired; Pittsburgh Pirates Hall of Fame

Member of the National

Baseball Hall of Fame
- Induction: 1952
- Vote: 83.3% (sixth ballot)

Paul Glee Waner (April 16, 1903 – August 29, 1965), nicknamed "Big Poison", was an American professional baseball right fielder who played in Major League Baseball (MLB) for four teams between 1926 and 1945, most notably playing his first 15 seasons with the Pittsburgh Pirates. The greatest Pirate outfielder up to his retirement, he won the 1927 NL Most Valuable Player Award in his second season, collecting a team-record 237 hits that year. Waner set the team record for doubles in a season three times, including 1932 when he set the NL record for doubles in a season with 62. In the only postseason appearance of his career, he hit .333 in the Pirates' 1927 World Series loss against the New York Yankees. Waner won three National League (NL) batting titles, led the NL in hits twice, and collected over 200 hits eight times including four consecutive seasons from 1927 to 1930.

On June 19, 1942, Waner became the seventh member of the 3,000 hit club, with a single off Rip Sewell. He led the NL in putouts four times and holds the career record for most putouts by a right fielder. Waner's 191 triples are 10th all-time and the most among players whose entire careers were in the live-ball era, and his 605 doubles are 14th all-time. A career .333 hitter, he was elected to the National Baseball Hall of Fame in 1952. When Waner's younger brother Lloyd was elected to the Hall of Fame, they became the second pair of brothers in the National Baseball Hall of Fame, after Harry and George Wright. Paul and Lloyd also hold the record for the most hits recorded by brothers (5,611). On July 21, 2007, Waner's No. 11 was retired by the Pittsburgh Pirates.

== Early life ==
Waner was born in Harrah in the Oklahoma Territory, four years before the region became a state. He was the third child of five of Ora and Etta Waner. His younger brother Lloyd Waner is also a member of the National Baseball Hall of Fame; Ora had once been offered a contract by the Chicago White Stockings but declined it, instead settling on a 400-acre farm. Waner was born with the middle name of John but his middle name was changed from John to Glee after an uncle named Glee gave him a shotgun at the age of 6. He stated that he learned batting from hitting corncobs on his father's farm, learning the way to follow the ball by seeing the movement of the cobs. Waner had astigmatism; he did not like wearing glasses on the field as it made the ball appear smaller and in focus, but without glasses, the ball looked grapefruit-sized. With the larger apparent size of the baseball, he was able to hit the center more often.

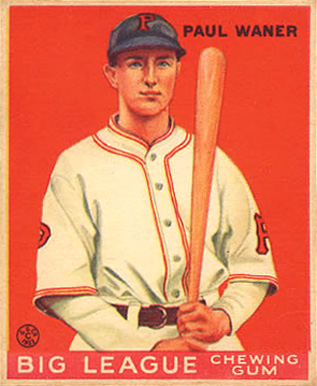
1933 Paul Waner baseball card

Waner played baseball at East Central State Teachers College (now known as East Central University) in Ada, Oklahoma; he pitched to a 23–4 record with a 1.70 earned run average in 1922. Waner's father had wanted him to be a teacher, but Waner wanted to play pro baseball and dropped out of college as a result. He signed with the team in Joplin, Missouri in the Class A Western League. Then, Waner was sent to the Southwestern League (equivalent to Rookie League) in Muskogee before being sold again to the Class AA San Francisco Seals of the Pacific Coast League in 1923, the manager of which was former Pirate, John "Dots" Miller. He only pitched one game for the Seals, in 1924 before he was moved to the outfield. With the Seals, Waner hit .378 over his three seasons, including .401 in their 1925 championship season.

== Major League Baseball career ==
=== Pittsburgh Pirates ===
In October 1925, the Pittsburgh Pirates of the National League purchased Waner and teammate Hal Rhyne from the Seals for $100,000. On April 17, 1926, against the Cincinnati Reds, he collected his first major league hit. On August 26, Waner collected six hits in six at-bats during a game against the Giants, and he accomplished this feat using six different bats from six different players. He ended his first season with a .336 batting average and led the NL in triples with 22. He also finished 12th in MVP voting as the Pirates finished in third place, 4.5 games behind the St. Louis Cardinals. By Waner's second season with the Pirates he and his younger brother Lloyd had become stars; combined, they accumulated 460 hits in the 1927 season. The 1927 season was a standout year for Paul. He played in a career-high 155 games (which led the league), and led the NL in hits (237), a team record, triples (18), batting average (.380) and RBIs (131). He set the major league record for consecutive games with an extra-base hit, with 14 (June 3–19, 1927); Since then this feat has also been accomplished by Chipper Jones in 2006. Aided by the contributions of the Waner brothers, Pittsburgh advanced to the 1927 World Series. In the only postseason appearance of his career, Paul went 5-for-15 with 3 RBIs and a .333 batting average, but the Pirates were swept by the New York Yankees. In recognition for his performance during the 1927 season, the National League awarded him the NL Most Valuable Player Award.

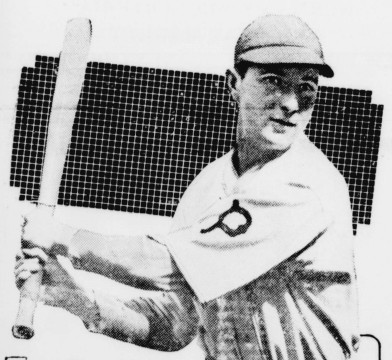
Waner, circa 1927

Waner hit .370 and led the NL in runs scored (142, a career high) and doubles (50) in 1928. His 223 hits in 1928 were tied (with his younger brother Lloyd) for second most in team history. He set a career high with 15 home runs in 1929. He also collected at least 200 hits for the third season in a row and hit .336 with 43 doubles and 100 RBIs for the second place Pirates. Playing in only 145 games (the fewest since his rookie year) during the 1930 season, he still recorded 217 hits with a .368 batting average and 117 runs. By his measure, 1931 was a disappointing year for Waner, who was injured and missed time during spring training. Nonetheless, he still hit .322 with 180 hits in 150 games. The Pirates finished below .500, with a 75–79 record, for the first time in Paul's career.

Coming off a down year, Waner hit .341 in 1932 with 215 hits (his fifth season with over 200 hits). He played in all 154 games, and set the National League record for doubles in a season with 62. During a game on May 12, Waner hit four doubles, which tied a major league record for doubles hit in a game. In 1933, he hit for a career low .309, the first time his average dipped below .320, and recorded 191 hits. The 1933 season was also the first year that Major League Baseball hosted the inaugural MLB All-Star Game, for which Waner was selected as a reserve outfielder. The Pirates finished second in the NL in both 1932 and 1933, first four games behind the Chicago Cubs and then five games behind the New York Giants.

Waner won his second NL batting title in 1934, hitting .362 and leading the league in hits (217), his sixth time collecting 200 or more hits, and runs (122). He finished second in MVP voting and was selected to his second MLB All-Star Game. In 1935, it was suggested by manager Pie Traynor that Waner give up hard liquor and switch to beer, and this resulted in Waner only hitting .242 on May 18. Traynor and Waner went to a bar before playing the Giants on May 19, and when Waner ordered a beer Traynor said, "He will like Hell. Give him a shot of whiskey." Waner hit .331 in the remaining games to finish the season with a batting average of .321, with 78 RBIs and 176 hits in 139 games. In 1935, he was selected to his third MLB All-Star Game. In 1936, Waner won his third NL batting title with a batting average of .373, the second highest of his career, while collecting 94 RBIs (his third highest in his career), 53 doubles (second highest), and 218 hits. He collected over 200 hits for the final time in 1937, when he had a .354 batting average, while driving in 74. The 1937 season was the eighth time he collected 200 or more hits in a season; at the time, only Hall of Famer Ty Cobb had more 200 hit seasons (nine). It was also his fourth and final MLB All-Star Game selection.

Famous for his ability to hit while hung over, when Waner gave up drinking in 1938 at management's request, he hit only .280—the first of only two times that he failed to hit .300 as a Pirate. That year, he had 69 RBIs, 31 doubles and 175 hits in 148 games. As Casey Stengel said in complimenting his base-running skills, "He had to be a very graceful player, because he could slide without breaking the bottle on his hip." Waner bounced back to a .328 average in 1939, with 45 RBIs and 151 hits in 125 games; this was the last season he collected over 100 hits. He had 1,959 of his 3,152 career hits in the 1930s, with five seasons during the decade with over 200 hits. During that decade, he garnered votes for MVP five times, finishing fourth in 1932, second in 1934, 24th in 1935, fifth in 1936, and eighth in 1937. The 1940 season was Waner's last as a Pirate. He hit .290 while having 32 RBIs and 69 hits in 89 games, having pulled the ligaments in his right knee after stepping awkwardly on a base, missing three weeks along with playing time after healing up. Waner was released on December 5, 1940. In his 15-year career with the Pirates, he had 2,868 hits, 1,177 RBIs, 558 doubles, 187 triples, and a .340 batting average in 2,154 games. The Pirates only finished with a losing record three times while Waner was on the team, and finished as one of the top three teams in the NL a total of seven times from 1926 to 1940.

=== Later career ===
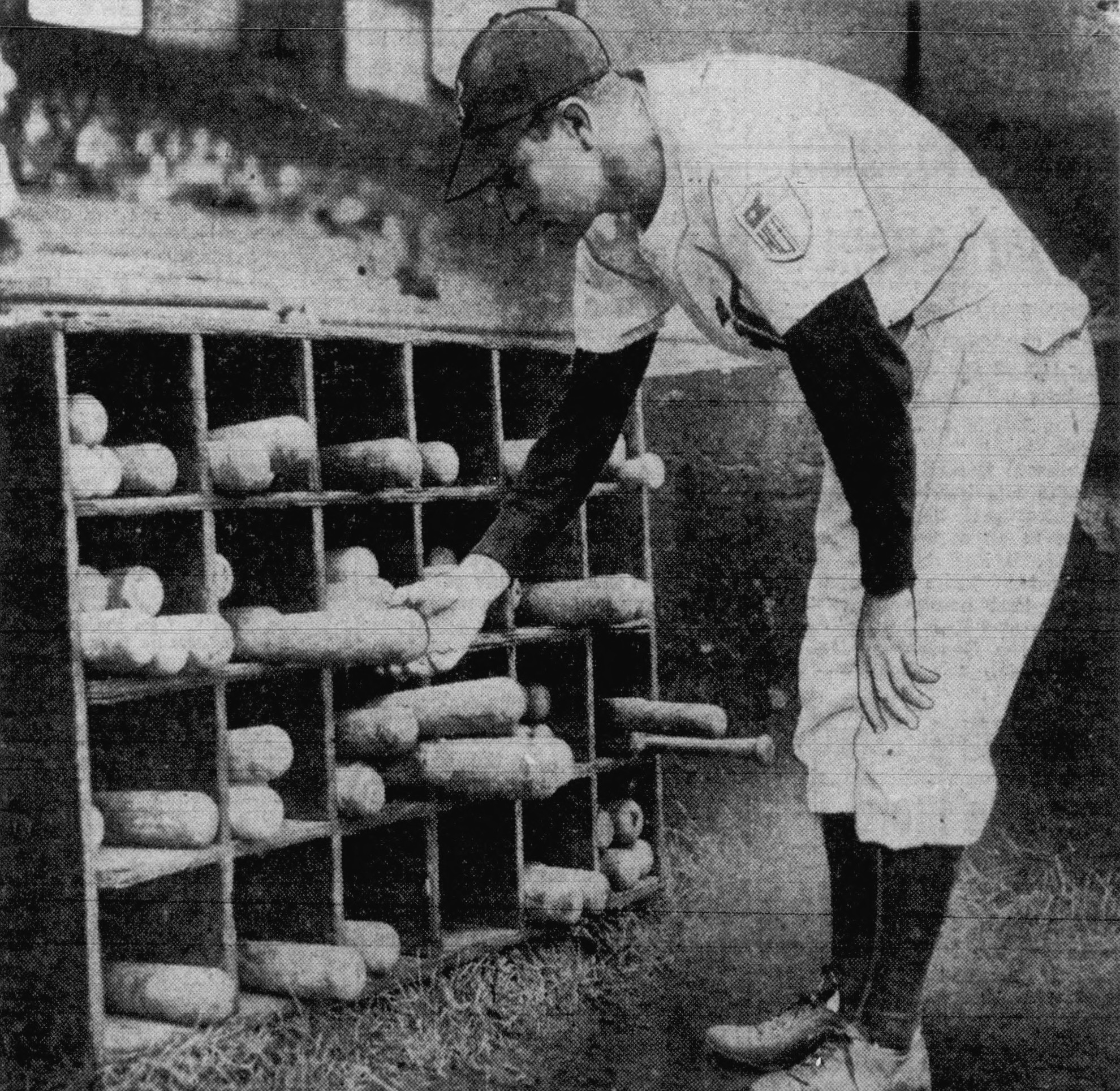
Waner with the Braves c. 1942

On January 31, 1941, Waner was signed by the Brooklyn Dodgers and would patrol the outfield with Hall of Famer Joe Medwick. After an impressive spring training he was offered the starting right field spot. After 11 games he was released by the Dodgers after only hitting .171 with 6 hits. He was signed by the Boston Braves two weeks later, and he hit for .267, collected 50 RBIs, and had 88 hits in 106 combined games during the season. He spent the next season with the team, recording a .258 average, 39 RBIs and 86 hits in 114 games. Waner got his 3,000th hit off old Pirate teammate Rip Sewell on June 19, 1942, becoming the seventh hitter (after Ty Cobb, Tris Speaker, Honus Wagner, Eddie Collins, Nap Lajoie, and Cap Anson) to do so. He was released by Boston on January 19, 1943. Two days later, the Dodgers signed him again. A spike injury to his foot meant that he missed time once again, but he still hit for .311 in 82 games while having 36 RBIs and 70 hits, a career low for a whole season played. The 1944 season was his last full season. He played 92 total games, 83 with the Dodgers and nine with the Yankees after being released by the former on September 1, batting .280 with 17 RBIs and 40 hits. He played one game for the Yankees in 1945, making one plate appearance as a pinch hitter in which he drew a walk.

== Later life and legacy ==
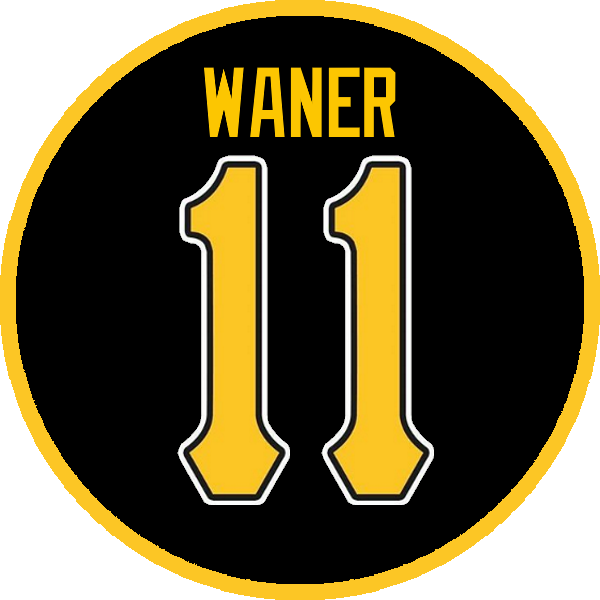
Paul Waner's number 11 was retired by the Pittsburgh Pirates in 2007.

Waner led the National League in batting on three occasions and accumulated over 3,000 hits during his 20-year baseball career. He hit 605 doubles, which at the time of his retirement was fifth-most all-time. He collected 200 or more hits on eight occasions, collected 50 or more doubles in three seasons, was voted the NL's Most Valuable Player in 1927, and had a lifetime batting average of .333, tied for fifth highest (with Eddie Collins) for anyone in the 3,000 hit club. His 191 triples are 10th most all time. Waner recorded one six-hit game, 5 five-hit games, and 55 four-hit games in his career. Stengel once stated that Waner was the best right fielder in National League history. Russo said, "Paul was a speedy outfielder who possessed perhaps the strongest arm in a Pittsburgh outfield until the arrival of Roberto Clemente." At the plate, Waner had a reputation for being fearless. He said, "I never let them [pitchers] get the better of me. If you flinch and show any fear, you're done."

Waner (3,152) and his younger brother, Lloyd (2,459), hold the career record for hits by brothers (5,611), outpacing the three Alou brothers (5,094): Felipe (2,101), Matty (1,777) and Jesús (1,216), and the three DiMaggio brothers (4,853): Joe (2,214), Dom (1,680) and Vince (959), among others. For most of the period from 1927 to 1940, Paul patrolled right field at Forbes Field while Lloyd covered the ground next to him in center field. On September 15, 1938, the brothers hit back-to-back home runs against Cliff Melton of the New York Giants. The origin of the nicknames "Big Poison" and "Little Poison" that were given to Paul and his younger brother Lloyd, respectively, is from a game at the Polo Grounds during the 1927 season when a fan pronounced "person" as "poison" as he called out to the brothers. (Note: A popular story concerning their nickname is that a Brooklyn fan at Ebbets Field once said, "Them Waners! It's always the little poison on thoid and the big poison on foist." However, Paul said it was a Giant fan at the Polo Grounds.)

After his retirement, he kept active by fishing, hunting, golfing and being a part-time hitting coach for the Phillies, Cardinals, and Braves. Ted Williams credited Waner with advising him to move away from the plate to successfully combat the "Williams" shift. However, Russo noted that "Like Babe Ruth, [Waner's] distaste for discipline made him an inappropriate candidate for managing." A proficient golfer, Waner could shoot in the 70's. He was one of the people instrumental in starting the National Baseball Players Golf Tournament. In his spare time, he enjoyed reading Seneca, and he once authored a comedy skit that he and Heinie Manush acted in.

Waner was named to the National Baseball Hall of Fame on July 21, 1952. "Gee. It's what I've been looking for a long time, but I had almost given up hope of making it," he said. "In fact, I guess you can say I've achieved my life's ambition. Any baseball player's ambition." With the induction of his brother Lloyd in 1967, they became the second brother combination to be inducted into the Hall of Fame (with Harry and George Wright being the other). Waner was interviewed for the 1966 book The Glory of Their Times. He died on August 29, 1965, in Sarasota, Florida after a respiratory arrest from emphysema complicated by pneumonia at the age of 62.

In 1999, he was ranked number 62 on The Sporting News' list of the 100 Greatest Baseball Players, and was nominated as a finalist for the Major League Baseball All-Century Team. Separate efforts by the Waner family and two longtime Pirates fans, who repeatedly petitioned Pirates then-owner Kevin McClatchy to honor Waner by retiring his uniform number, were eventually successful. The Pirates retired Waner's No. 11 in a ceremony before their game vs. the Astros on July 21, 2007, 55 years to the day of his induction into the Hall of Fame. A plaque was placed in the interior of PNC Park to commemorate the retiring of Waner's jersey.

== See also ==
- 3,000 hit club
- List of Major League Baseball hit records
- List of Major League Baseball doubles records
- List of Major League Baseball triples records
- List of Major League Baseball career batting average leaders
- List of Major League Baseball career on-base percentage leaders
- List of Major League Baseball career hits leaders
- List of Major League Baseball career extra base hits leaders
- List of Major League Baseball career doubles leaders
- List of Major League Baseball career triples leaders
- List of Major League Baseball career total bases leaders
- List of Major League Baseball career runs scored leaders
- List of Major League Baseball career runs batted in leaders
- List of Major League Baseball batting champions
- List of Major League Baseball annual doubles leaders
- List of Major League Baseball annual triples leaders
- List of Major League Baseball annual runs scored leaders
- List of Major League Baseball annual runs batted in leaders
- List of Major League Baseball single-game hits leaders
