= Jimmy Macullar =

American baseball player (1855–1924)

- Shortstop/Center fielder
- Born: January 16, 1855; Boston, Massachusetts, U.S.
- Died: April 8, 1924 (aged 69); Baltimore, Maryland, U.S.
- Batted: Right Threw: Left

MLB debut
- May 5, 1879, for the Syracuse Stars

Last MLB appearance
- October 14, 1886, for the Baltimore Orioles

MLB statistics
- Games played: 449
- Batting average: .207
- Runs scored: 246
- Stats at Baseball Reference

Teams
- As player: Syracuse Stars (1879); Cincinnati Red Stockings (1882–1883); Baltimore Orioles (1884–1886); As manager: Syracuse Stars (1879)

James F. Macullar (January 16, 1855 – April 8, 1924), also known as "Little Mac", was an American Major League Baseball player from Boston, Massachusetts. He played mostly at shortstop, but did play many games in center field, for three different teams in two leagues. He holds the record for career games played at shortstop by a left-handed thrower, at 325, and is the only lefty to ever play more than 250 games at that position. Nicknamed "Little Mac", due to his small stature (5'6", 155 lbs), he was briefly a player-manager for the Syracuse Stars in 1879. Finishing with a 5-21 record, he never managed again.

In the winter of 1879–80, Macullar and Hick Carpenter became the first North Americans to play in the Cuban League. They were signed by the Colón club and were so dominant that other teams refused to play against them.

He died in Baltimore, Maryland on April 8, 1924, at the age of 69, and was interred at Baltimore Cemetery.

== See also ==
- List of Major League Baseball player–managers
