= Jake Knodell =

American baseball player (1852–1887)

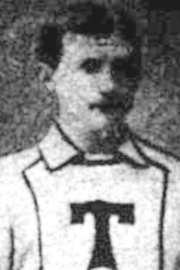
- Catcher
- Born: July 26, 1852; Brooklyn, New York, U.S.
- Died: October 26, 1887 (aged 35); Flatbush, New York, U.S.
- Batted: Unknown Threw: Unknown

Major-league debut
- May 15, 1874, for the Brooklyn Atlantics

Last major-league appearance
- August 17, 1878, for the Milwaukee Grays

Major-league statistics
- Batting average: .179
- Home runs: 0
- Runs batted in: 14
- Stats at Baseball Reference

Teams
- Brooklyn Atlantics (1874–1875); Milwaukee Grays (1878)

Jacob Augustus Knodell (July 26, 1852 - October 26, 1887) was an American Major League Baseball player who played mainly catcher for the Brooklyn Atlantics of the National Association and the Milwaukee Grays of the National League. In 1877, he played for the London Tecumsehs of the International Association.
