= List of Major League Baseball hit records =

This is a list of Major League Baseball hit records. Bolded names mean the player is still active and playing.

== 3,000 career hits ==
Cap Anson reached 3,000 hits on July 18, 1897. He was the first, and, as of 2022, the oldest player to reach the mark.

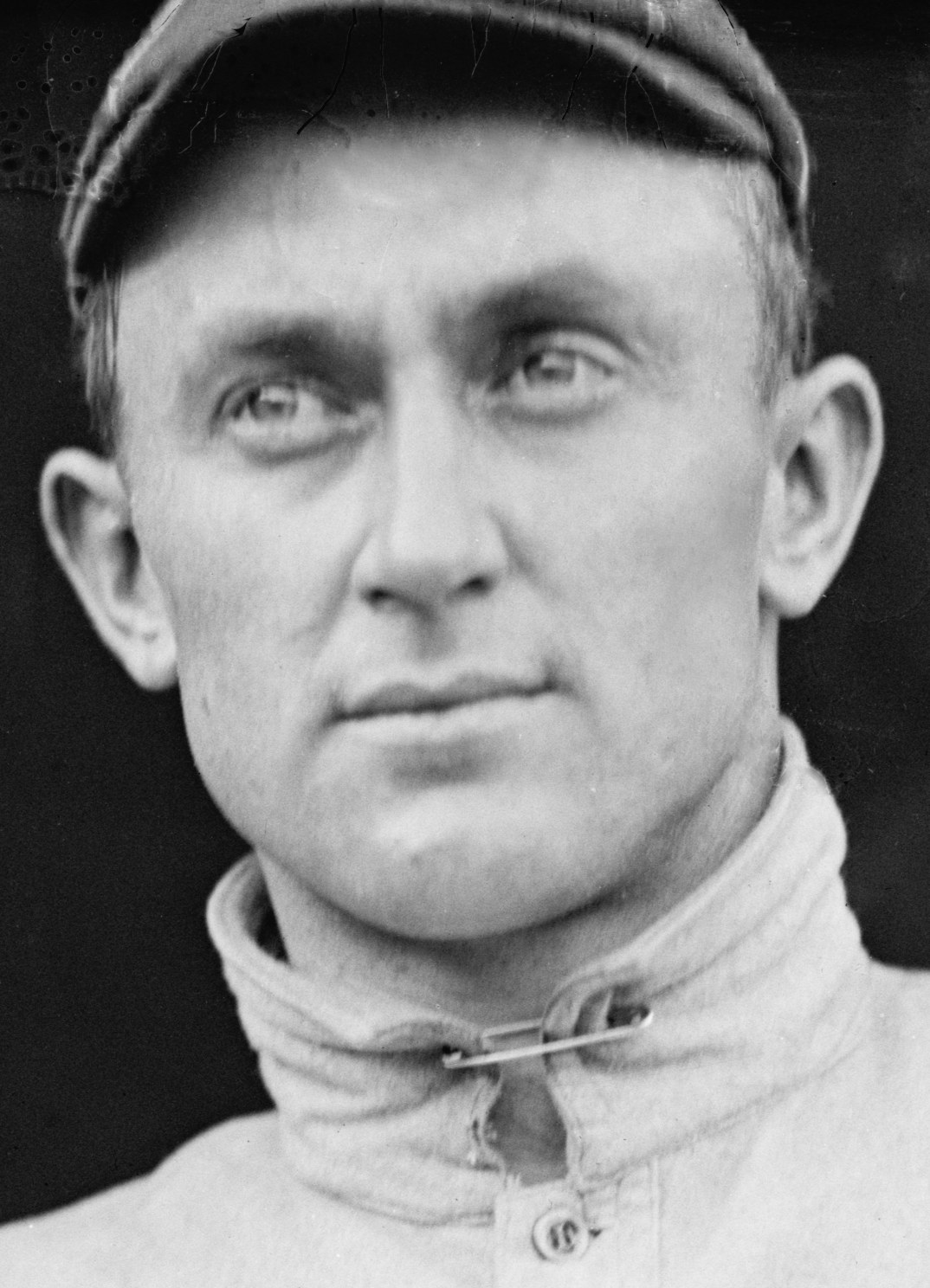
In 1927, Ty Cobb became the first player to collect 4,000 hits. He remains the youngest player to reach 3,000 hits, doing so at the age of 34. He also achieved 3,000 hits in the fewest games played (2,135).

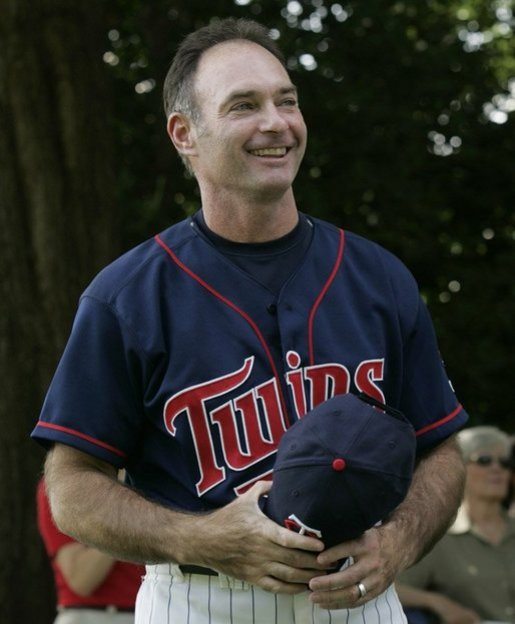
Paul Molitor was the first to triple for his 3,000th hit.

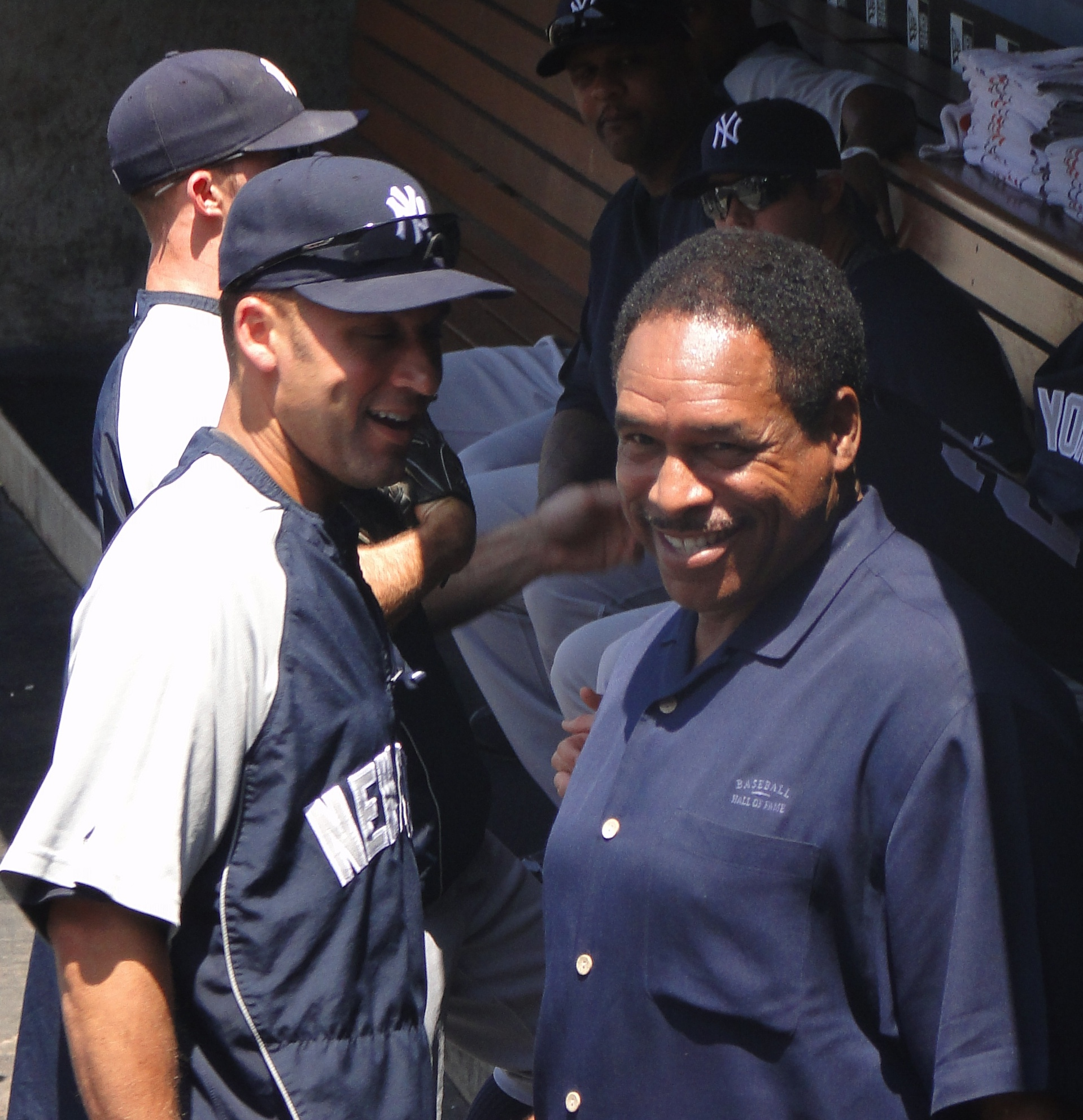
Derek Jeter (left) and Dave Winfield (right) are both members.

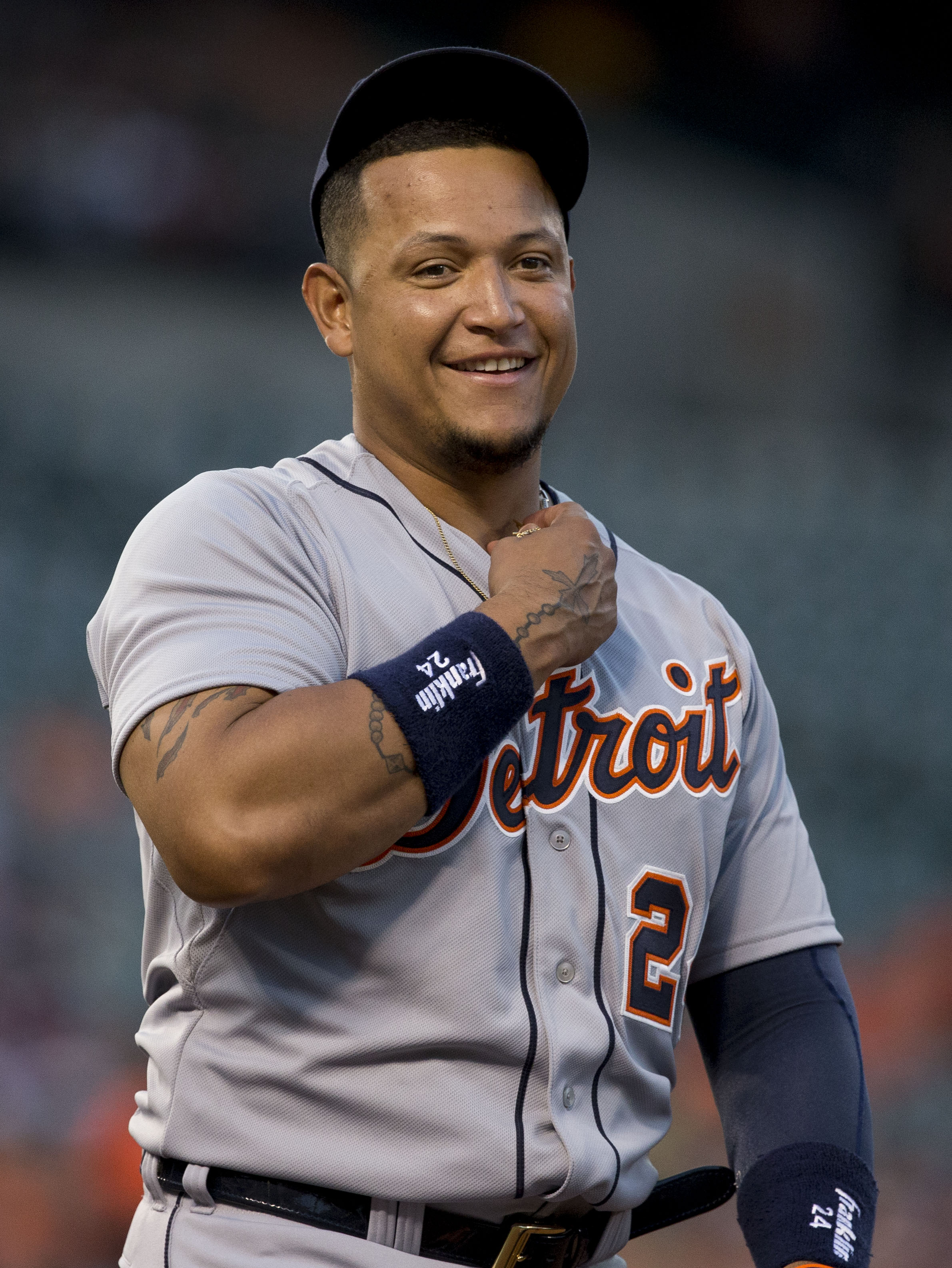
Miguel Cabrera, joining on April 23, 2022, is the most recent addition to the club.

Player	Name of the player
Hits	Career hits
Average	Career batting average
Date	Date of the player's 3,000th hit
Team	The batter's team for his 3,000th hit
Seasons	The seasons this player played in the major leagues
3,000th hit	The type of hit the batter recorded for his 3,000th hit
*	Elected to the Baseball Hall of Fame
‡	Player is active
†	Also hit 500 home runs

Statistics updated as of March 25, 2026.

Player	Hits	Average	Date	Team	Seasons	3,000th hit	Ref
Pete Rose (Note: Due to betting on games while managing an MLB team, Pete Rose received a permanent ban from baseball and only became eligible for selection to the Baseball Hall of Fame in 2025.)	4,256	.303	May 5, 1978	Cincinnati Reds	1963–1986	Single	
Ty Cobb*	4,189 (Note: MLB.com and the Hall of Fame credit Cobb with 4,191 hits, while Baseball-Reference lists 4,189; the discrepancy is due to a double-counted 1910 game in which Cobb was credited with 2 hits, which was first discovered in 1978 and reported on in 1981.)	.366	August 19, 1921	Detroit Tigers	1905–1928	Single	
Hank Aaron^{†}*	3,771	.305	May 17, 1970	Atlanta Braves	1954–1976	Single	
Stan Musial*	3,630	.331	May 13, 1958	St. Louis Cardinals	1941–1944, 1946–1963	Double	
Tris Speaker*	3,514	.345	May 17, 1925	Cleveland Indians	1907–1928	Single	
Derek Jeter*	3,465	.310	July 9, 2011	New York Yankees	1995–2014	Home run	
Honus Wagner*	3,430	.329	June 9, 1914	Pittsburgh Pirates	1897–1917	Double	
Carl Yastrzemski*	3,419	.285	September 12, 1979	Boston Red Sox	1961–1983	Single	
Albert Pujols^{†}	3,384	.296	May 4, 2018	Los Angeles Angels	2001–2022	Single	
Paul Molitor*	3,319	.306	September 16, 1996	Minnesota Twins	1978–1998	Triple	
Eddie Collins*	3,315	.333	June 3, 1925	Chicago White Sox	1906–1930	Single	
Willie Mays^{†}*	3,293	.301	July 18, 1970	San Francisco Giants	1948, 1951–1952, 1954–1973	Single	
Eddie Murray^{†}*	3,255	.287	June 30, 1995	Cleveland Indians	1977–1997	Single	
Nap Lajoie*	3,252 (Note: MLB.com credits Lajoie with 3,252 hits, while Baseball-Reference lists 3,243. The discrepancy is due to a transcription error for Lajoie's hit total in 1901, 229, which until 1954 was inaccurately recorded as 220.)	.339	September 27, 1914	Cleveland Naps	1896–1916	Double	
Cal Ripken Jr.*	3,184	.276	April 15, 2000	Baltimore Orioles	1981–2001	Single	
Miguel Cabrera^{†}	3,174	.307	April 23, 2022	Detroit Tigers	2003–2023	Single	
Adrián Beltré*	3,166	.286	July 30, 2017	Texas Rangers	1998–2018	Double	
George Brett*	3,154	.305	September 30, 1992	Kansas City Royals	1973–1993	Single	
Paul Waner*	3,152	.333	June 19, 1942	Boston Braves	1926–1945	Single	
Robin Yount*	3,142	.285	September 9, 1992	Milwaukee Brewers	1974–1993	Single	
Tony Gwynn*	3,141	.338	August 6, 1999	San Diego Padres	1982–2001	Single	
Alex Rodriguez^{†}	3,115	.295	June 19, 2015	New York Yankees	1994–2013, 2015–2016	Home run	
Dave Winfield*	3,110	.283	September 16, 1993	Minnesota Twins	1973–1995	Single	
Ichiro Suzuki*	3,089	.311	August 7, 2016	Miami Marlins	2001–2019	Triple	
Craig Biggio*	3,060	.281	June 28, 2007	Houston Astros	1988–2007	Single (Note: Biggio was thrown out trying to stretch his single into a double.)	
Rickey Henderson*	3,055	.279	October 7, 2001	San Diego Padres	1979–2003	Double	
Rod Carew*	3,053	.328	August 4, 1985	California Angels	1967–1985	Single	
Lou Brock*	3,023	.293	August 13, 1979	St. Louis Cardinals	1961–1979	Single	
Rafael Palmeiro^{†}	3,020	.288	July 15, 2005	Baltimore Orioles	1986–2005	Double	
Cap Anson*	3,011 (Note: Two major factors have confused Anson's precise hit total. First, a rule which existed for only the 1887 MLB season counted walks as hits. Additionally, Anson played five seasons in the National Association (NA), which is not always recognized as an official "major league". MLB.com credits Anson with 3,011 career hits, not including his time in the NA or his walks in 1887. Baseball-Reference credits him with 3,435 hits, including his time in the NA, not including his walks in 1887, and crediting him with one more hit than MLB.com for his hit total in 1894. The Hall of Fame shows 3,081 hits for Anson, including his walks in 1887 (for a total of 224 hits that season) but not including NA playing time. Elias Sports Bureau also credits him with 3,081 hits. The date listed in this article comes from MLB.com, using their hit totals for Anson.)	.331	July 18, 1897	Chicago Colts	1871–1897	Single	
Wade Boggs*	3,010	.328	August 7, 1999	Tampa Bay Devil Rays	1982–1999	Home run	
Al Kaline*	3,007	.297	September 24, 1974	Detroit Tigers	1953–1974	Double	
Roberto Clemente*	3,000	.317	September 30, 1972	Pittsburgh Pirates	1955–1972	Double	

== 240+ hits in one season ==
Player	Hits	Team	Season
Ichiro Suzuki	264	Seattle Mariners	2004
George Sisler	257	St. Louis Browns	1920
Lefty O'Doul	254	Philadelphia Phillies	1929
Bill Terry	254	New York Giants	1930
Al Simmons	253	Philadelphia Athletics	1925
Rogers Hornsby	250	St. Louis Cardinals	1922
Chuck Klein	250	Philadelphia Phillies	1930
Ty Cobb	248	Detroit Tigers	1911
George Sisler	246	St. Louis Browns	1922
Ichiro Suzuki	242 (Note: While Ichiro Suzuki had played professionally in Japan, this mark is considered the Major League Baseball record for rookies, as this was his first year in Major League Baseball.)	Seattle Mariners	2001
Heinie Manush	241	St. Louis Browns	1928
Babe Herman	241	Brooklyn Dodgers	1930
Wade Boggs	240	Boston Red Sox	1985
Darin Erstad	240	Anaheim Angels	2000

=== Evolution of the single season record for hits ===
Hits	Player	Team	Year	Years Record Stood
138	Ross Barnes	Chicago White Stockings	1876	7
146	Roger Connor	New York Gothams	1883	1
162	Ezra Sutton	Boston Beaneaters	1884	1
169	Roger Connor	New York Gothams	1885	1
187	Cap Anson	Chicago White Stockings	1886	1
225	Tip O'Neill	St. Louis Cardinals	1887	7
237	Hugh Duffy	Boston Braves	1894	5
238	Ed Delahanty	Philadelphia Phillies	1899	12
248	Ty Cobb	Detroit Tigers	1911	9
257	George Sisler	St. Louis Browns	1920	84
262	Ichiro Suzuki	Seattle Mariners	2004	22 (current)

=== Three or more seasons with 215+ hits ===
Player	Seasons	Seasons & Teams
Paul Waner	7	1927–1928, 1930, 1932, 1934, 1936–1937 Pittsburgh
Rogers Hornsby	5	1920–1922, 1924 St. Louis-NL; 1929 Chicago-NL
Ichiro Suzuki	5	2001, 2004, 2006–2007, 2009 Seattle
Ty Cobb	4	1909, 1911–1912, 1917 Detroit
George Sisler	4	1920–1922, 1925 St. Louis-AL
Sam Rice	3	1924–1926 Washington-AL
Joe Medwick	3	1935–1937 St. Louis-NL
Stan Musial	3	1943, 1946, 1948 St. Louis-NL
Pete Rose	3	1969, 1973, 1976 Cincinnati
Kirby Puckett	3	1986, 1988–1989 Minnesota
Michael Young	3	2004–2006 Texas

=== Five or more seasons with 200+ hits ===
Player	Seasons	Seasons & Teams
Ichiro Suzuki	10	2001–2010 Seattle (consecutive years - record)
Pete Rose	10	1965–1966, 1968–1970, 1973, 1975–1977 Cincinnati; 1979 Philadelphia-NL
Ty Cobb	9	1907, 1909, 1911–1912, 1915–1917, 1922, 1924 Detroit
Paul Waner	8	1927–1930, 1932, 1934, 1936–1937 Pittsburgh
Lou Gehrig	8	1927–1928, 1930–1932, 1934, 1936–1937 New York-AL
Willie Keeler	8	1894–1898 Baltimore; 1899–1901 Brooklyn-NL
Derek Jeter	8	1998–2000, 2005–2007, 2009, 2012 New York-AL
Rogers Hornsby	7	1920–1922, 1924–1925 St. Louis-NL; 1927 New York-NL; 1929 Chicago-NL
Charlie Gehringer	7	1929–1930, 1933–1937 Detroit
Wade Boggs	7	1983–1989 Boston-AL
George Sisler	6	1920–1922, 1925, 1927 St. Louis-AL; 1929 Boston-NL
Sam Rice	6	1920, 1924–1926, 1928, 1930 Washington-AL
Al Simmons	6	1925, 1929–1932 Philadelphia-AL; 1933 Chicago-AL
Stan Musial	6	1943, 1946, 1948–1949, 1951, 1953 St. Louis-NL
Steve Garvey	6	1974–1976, 1978–1980 Los Angeles-NL
Michael Young	6	2003–2007, 2011 Texas
Chuck Klein	5	1929–1933 Philadelphia-NL
Kirby Puckett	5	1986–1989, 1992 Minnesota
Tony Gwynn	5	1984, 1986–1987, 1989, 1997 San Diego

=== 100 or more hits from each side of the plate, season ===
Player	LH hits	RH hits	Season & Teams
Garry Templeton	111	100	1979 St. Louis Cardinals
Willie Wilson	130	100	1980 Kansas City Royals

== League leader in hits ==
=== League leader in hits 5 or more seasons ===
Player	Titles	Seasons & Teams
Ty Cobb	8	1907–1909, 1911–1912, 1915, 1917, 1919 Detroit
Pete Rose	7	1965, 1968, 1970, 1972–1973, 1976 Cincinnati; 1981 Philadelphia-NL
Tony Gwynn	7	1984, 1986–1987, 1989, 1994–1995, 1997 San Diego
Ichiro Suzuki	7	2001, 2004, 2006–2010 Seattle
Stan Musial	6	1943–1944, 1946, 1948–1949, 1952 St. Louis-NL
Tony Oliva	5	1964–1966, 1969–1970 Minnesota

=== League leader in hits 3 or more consecutive seasons ===
Player	Titles	Seasons & Teams
Ichiro Suzuki	5	2006–2010 Seattle Mariners
**Jose Altuve**	4	2014–2017 Houston Astros
Ginger Beaumont	3	1902–1904 Pittsburgh Pirates
Ty Cobb	3	1907–1909 Detroit Tigers
Rogers Hornsby	3	1920–1922 St. Louis Cardinals
Tony Oliva	3	1964–1966 Minnesota Twins
Kirby Puckett	3	1987–1989 Minnesota Twins
Johnny Pesky	3 (Note: After leading the American League in 1942, Pesky missed the next three full seasons serving in World War II. As 1942 was his rookie season, he is the only player to lead his league in hits for his first three seasons.)	1942, 1946–1947 Boston Red Sox
Stan Musial	3 (Note: After leading the National League in 1944, Musial missed the next season serving in World War II.)	1943-1944, 1946 St. Louis Cardinals

=== League leader in hits, three decades ===
Player	Seasons & Teams
Pete Rose	1965, 1968, 1970, 1972–1973, 1976 Cincinnati Reds; 1981 Philadelphia Phillies

=== League leader in hits, both leagues ===
Player	Seasons & Teams
Lance Johnson	1995 Chicago White Sox; 1996 New York Mets

=== League leader in hits, three different teams ===
Player	Seasons & Teams
Paul Molitor	1991 Milwaukee Brewers; 1993 Toronto Blue Jays; 1996 Minnesota Twins

== Consecutive game hitting streaks of 30 or more games ==
Player	Games	Team	Season
Joe DiMaggio	56	New York Yankees	1941
Willie Keeler	45 (1, 44)	Baltimore Orioles	1896–1897
Pete Rose	44	Cincinnati Reds	1978
Bill Dahlen	42	Chicago Colts	1894
George Sisler	41	St. Louis Browns	1922
Ty Cobb	40	Detroit Tigers	1911
Paul Molitor	39	Milwaukee Brewers	1987
Jimmy Rollins	38 (36, 2)	Philadelphia Phillies	2005–2006
Tommy Holmes	37	Boston Braves	1945
Gene DeMontreville	36	Washington Senators	1896–1897
Fred Clarke	35	Louisville Colonels	1895
Ty Cobb	35	Detroit Tigers	1917
George Sisler	35 (1, 34)	St. Louis Browns	1924–1925
Luis Castillo	35	Florida Marlins	2002
Chase Utley	35	Philadelphia Phillies	2006
George McQuinn	34	St. Louis Browns	1938
Dom DiMaggio	34	Boston Red Sox	1949
Benito Santiago	34	San Diego Padres	1987
George Davis	33	New York Giants	1893
Hal Chase	33	New York Highlanders	1907
Rogers Hornsby	33	St. Louis Cardinals	1922
Heinie Manush	33	Washington Senators	1933
Dan Uggla	33	Atlanta Braves	2011
Harry Heilmann	32 (11, 23)	Detroit Tigers	1922–1923
Hal Morris	32 (29, 3)	Cincinnati Reds	1996–1997
Ed Delahanty	31	Philadelphia Phillies	1899
Napoleon Lajoie	31	Cleveland Naps	1906
Sam Rice	31	Washington Senators	1924
Vada Pinson	31 (27, 4)	Cincinnati Reds	1965–1966
Willie Davis	31	Los Angeles Dodgers	1969
Rico Carty	31	Atlanta Braves	1970
Ron LeFlore	31 (1, 30)	Detroit Tigers	1975–1976
Ken Landreaux	31	Minnesota Twins	1980
Vladimir Guerrero	31	Montreal Expos	1999
Whit Merrifield	31 (20, 11)	Kansas City Royals	2018–2019
Cal McVey	30	Chicago White Stockings	1876
Elmer Smith	30	Cincinnati Reds	1898
Tris Speaker	30	Boston Red Sox	1912
Sam Rice	30 (2, 28)	Washington Senators	1929–1930
Goose Goslin	30	Detroit Tigers	1934
Stan Musial	30	St. Louis Cardinals	1950
George Brett	30	Kansas City Royals	1980
Jerome Walton	30	Chicago Cubs	1989
Sandy Alomar Jr.	30	Cleveland Indians	1997
Nomar Garciaparra	30	Boston Red Sox	1997
Eric Davis	30	Baltimore Orioles	1998
Luis Gonzalez	30	Arizona Diamondbacks	1999
Albert Pujols	30	St. Louis Cardinals	2003
Willy Taveras	30	Houston Astros	2006
Moisés Alou	30	New York Mets	2007
Ryan Zimmerman	30	Washington Nationals	2009
Andre Ethier	30	Los Angeles Dodgers	2011
**Freddie Freeman**	30	Atlanta Braves	2016

Where possible, hitting streaks that extend between seasons are broken down to show when the hits occurred. For example, Keeler's (1, 44) indicates 1 hit in 1896, and 44 in 1897. (Note: Major League Baseball recognizes two hitting streak records: Longest hitting streak in one season, and longest hitting streak over multiple seasons (e.g. Rollins 2005–2006). Keeler's, Sisler's, and Rollins' streaks are listed as 44, 34, and 36 games when discussing single-season streaks, and 45, 35, and 38 games when discussing multiple-season streaks.)

This list omits Denny Lyons of the 1887 American Association Philadelphia Athletics, who had a 52-game hitting streak. In 1887, the major leagues adopted a new rule which counted walks as hits, a rule which was dropped after that season. Lyons hit in 52 consecutive games that season, but his streak included two games (#22 and #44) in which his only "hits" were walks. In 1968, MLB ruled that walks in 1887 would not be counted as hits, so Lyons' streak was no longer recognized, though it still appears on some lists. In 2000, Major League Baseball reversed its 1968 decision, ruling that the statistics which were recognized in each year's official records should stand, even in cases where they were later proven incorrect. Paradoxically, the ruling affects only hit totals for the year; the batting champion for the year is not recognized as the all-time leader despite having the highest single-season average under the ruling, and Lyons' hitting streak is not recognized.

== Consecutive game hitting streaks to start a career ==
Player	Games	Team	Season
Chuck Aleno	17	Cincinnati Reds	1941
David Dahl	17	Colorado Rockies	2016
Juan Pierre	16	Colorado Rockies	2000
James Jones	14	Seattle Mariners	2014
Dale Alexander	13	Detroit Tigers	1929
Mike Woodard	13	San Francisco Giants	1985
Rocco Baldelli	13	Tampa Bay Rays	2003
Glenn Williams	13	Minnesota Twins	2005

== 7 or more hits by an individual in one game ==
Hits	Player	Team	Date	Opponent
9 (Note: 18 inning game)	Johnny Burnett	Cleveland Indians	July 10, 1932	Philadelphia Athletics
7	Wilbert Robinson	Baltimore Orioles	June 10, 1892	St. Louis Browns
7 (Note: Second game of a double header)	César Gutiérrez	Detroit Tigers	June 21, 1970	Cleveland Indians
7 (Note: 22 inning game)	Rocky Colavito	Detroit Tigers	June 24, 1962	New York Yankees
7	Rennie Stennett	Pittsburgh Pirates	September 16, 1975	Chicago Cubs
7 (Note: 14 inning game)	Brandon Crawford	San Francisco Giants	August 8, 2016	Miami Marlins

== 6 hits in a game by an individual, twice ==
Player	Team	Date
Cal McVey	Chicago White Stockings	July 22, 1876
	Chicago White Stockings	July 25, 1876
Jim Bottomley	St. Louis Cardinals	September 16, 1924
	St. Louis Cardinals	August 5, 1931
Doc Cramer	Philadelphia Athletics	June 20, 1932
	Philadelphia Athletics	July 13, 1935
Kirby Puckett	Minnesota Twins	August 30, 1987
	Minnesota Twins	May 23, 1991

Excluded on this list are Henry Larkin, who accomplished this with the Washington Senators in the American Association, and Ed Delahanty, with the Philadelphia Phillies in the Players' League.

== 3 hits by an individual in one inning ==
- Tom Burns (September 6, 1883)
- Fred Pfeffer (September 6, 1883)
- Ned Williamson (September 6, 1883)
- Gene Stephens (June 18, 1953)
- Johnny Damon (June 27, 2003)

== See also ==
- List of Major League Baseball progressive career hits leaders
