= John Peters (shortstop) =

American baseball player (1850–1924)

- Shortstop
- Born: April 8, 1850; New Orleans, Louisiana, U.S.
- Died: January 4, 1924 (aged 73); St. Louis, Missouri, U.S.
- Batted: Right Threw: Right

MLB debut
- May 23, 1874, for the Chicago White Stockings

Last MLB appearance
- June 11, 1884, for the Pittsburgh Alleghenys

MLB statistics
- Batting average: .278
- Home runs: 3
- Runs scored: 372
- Stats at Baseball Reference

Teams
- Chicago White Stockings (1874–1877); Milwaukee Grays (1878); Chicago White Stockings (1879); Providence Grays (1880); Buffalo Bisons (1881); Pittsburgh Alleghenys (1882–1884)

John Phillip Peters (April 8, 1850 – January 4, 1924) was an American shortstop who played in Major League Baseball with four clubs from 1874 through 1884. Peters batted and threw right-handed.

== Biography ==
He was born in New Orleans, Louisiana.

Peters reached the majors in 1874 with the Chicago White Stockings (NA/NL), spending four years with them before moving to the Milwaukee Grays (NL, 1878), again with Chicago (NL, 1879), and the Providence Grays (NL, 1880), Buffalo Bisons (NL, 1881) and Pittsburgh Alleghenys (NL, 1882–1884). He was the everyday shortstop of the pennant-winning 1876 Chicago White Stockings in the very first year of the National League.

Peters averaged .328 from 1876 to 1878, with a career-high .351 in the 1876 championship season to finish fourth in the National League batting title behind Ross Barnes (.429), George Hall (.366) and Cap Anson (.356). He also twice led the shortstops in putouts in 1879 (280) and 1890 (277).

While in Chicago, Peters shared infield defense duties with first basemen Cal McVey and Albert Spalding; 2B Ross Barnes, 3B Cap Anson, and catchers Deacon White and Cal McVey as well. In 1881, with Buffalo, he again played on a team that featured early stars as Davy Force (IF), Dan Brouthers (1B) and Jim O'Rourke (OF).

In an 11-season career, Peters was a .278 hitter (748-for-2695) with three home runs and 249 RBI in 615 games, including 372 runs, 92 doubles, 12 triples, and 14 stolen bases.

He died in St. Louis, Missouri, at the age of 73.
