= Cal McVey =

American baseball player (1849–1926)

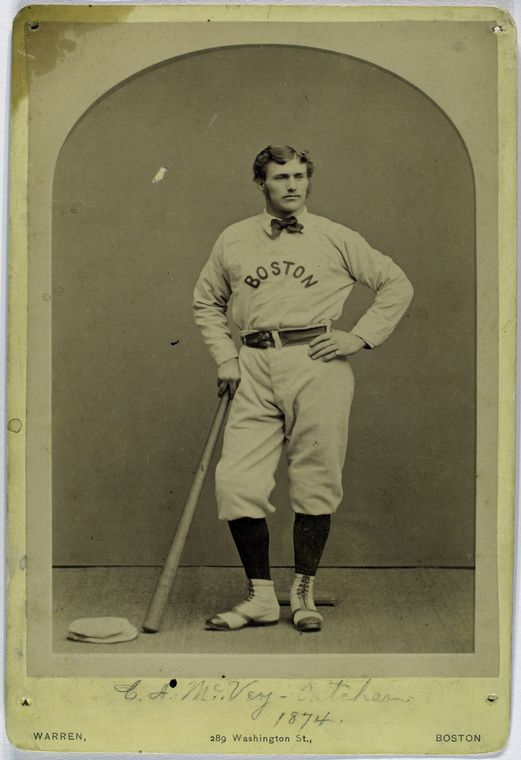
- McVey in 1874
- First baseman / Catcher / Outfielder
- Born: August 30, 1849; Montrose, Iowa, U.S.
- Died: August 20, 1926 (aged 76); San Francisco, California, U.S.
- Batted: Right Threw: Right

MLB debut
- May 5, 1871, for the Boston Red Stockings

Last MLB appearance
- September 30, 1879, for the Cincinnati Reds

MLB statistics
- Batting average: .346
- Runs scored: 555
- Runs batted in: 449
- Stats at Baseball Reference

Teams
- National Association of Base Ball Players Active of Indianapolis (1868) Cincinnati Red Stockings (1869–1870) League player Boston Red Stockings (1871–1872, 1874–1875) Baltimore Canaries (1873) Chicago White Stockings (1876–1877) Cincinnati Reds (1878–1879) League manager Baltimore Canaries (1873) Cincinnati Reds (1878–1879)

Career highlights and awards
- 2× National Association hits leader; 2× National Association RBI leader

Calvin Alexander McVey (August 30, 1849 – August 20, 1926) was an American professional baseball player during the 1860s and 1870s. McVey's importance to the game stems from his play on two of the earliest professional baseball teams, the original Cincinnati Red Stockings and the National Association Boston Red Stockings. He also played on the inaugural National League pennant-winning team, the 1876 Chicago White Stockings.

== Career ==
Cal McVey was born in rural Montrose, Iowa and moved to Indianapolis at 11, where he learned baseball and soon excelled at the game, playing for the Western and Active clubs in the National Association of Base Ball Players (NABBP). With McVey usually pitching, the Actives in 1868 defeated local rivals, lost to the three strong Eastern teams that toured the West, and won one game in six against Cincinnati teams. Despite a lopsided 7–54 defeat by the Cincinnati Red Stockings, that club later hired him to play in 1869 for $700 and he served as the regular right fielder for both of its storied seasons.

The Cincinnati Daily Times described Cal McVey in this way: "He is powerfully built, with broad shoulders and barrel chest...handsome though shy, and is a favorite of the ladies. He is very conscientious and a hard worker...a good fielder, but his strength is with the ash in his hands...he is a long...good thrower...and he doesn't drink."

McVey was in the middle of the most controversial game of the Red Stockings' reported 84-game winning streak in 1869 and 1870. Playing the Troy Haymakers, with the game tied 17–17, McVey fouled off a pitch the catcher claimed to have caught on the first bounce. That would have been an out but the umpire disagreed. In the ensuing argument, Troy left the field and the game was awarded to Cincinnati on forfeit.

With the Red Stockings going out of business, manager Harry Wright signed to organize and lead a team in Boston. He hired McVey, Charlie Gould, and George Wright to join him, composing almost half the team that just missed winning the first National Association pennant. With some personnel changes, the Boston Red Stockings won the other four NA pennants, dominating so severely in 1875 that they helped provoke a new league. McVey served Boston two seasons as the first catcher, otherwise in the outfield, followed by one season managing in Baltimore and two more seasons in Boston as an outfielder and second catcher. He has the NA record for most career runs batted in (276).

During the summer of 1875, Boston's four Western stars agreed to play the following season for the Chicago White Stockings: McVey, Deacon White, Ross Barnes, and Albert Spalding. Partly because the rules forbade such tampering, Chicago led the founding of a new National League of Professional Base Ball Clubs (NL). The Big Four and Cap Anson led the team to an easy win on the field, with McVey serving as regular first baseman, second pitcher to Spalding, and second catcher to White. Few pieces remained in place for the second season, when McVey worked as first catcher and second pitcher and the team slumped out of the picture. On July 22 and 25, 1876, McVey became the only player in MLB history to record six hits in two straight games.

In 1878, McVey returned to Cincinnati where he completed his major league career in two seasons as manager and infielder. The Cincinnati Reds finished a close second in his first year but slipped to fifth in 1879 (.538) ahead of only three new teams. The reserve rule was adopted that fall, maybe a factor in his move to California, which he had visited on the 1869 Red Stockings tour. He was still a star batsman at the major league level.

In San Francisco during the 1880s, McVey played for, managed, or organized several teams. He retired there and died in 1926 at age 76. His body was cremated.

== See also ==
- List of Major League Baseball annual runs scored leaders
- List of Major League Baseball annual doubles leaders
- List of Major League Baseball annual saves leaders
- List of Major League Baseball single-game hits leaders
- List of Major League Baseball hit records
- List of Major League Baseball player-managers

Preceded by Jack Manning	Cincinnati Reds (1876–1879) Managers; 1878–1879	Succeeded by Deacon White
