= Mike Golden (baseball) =

American baseball player (1851–1929)

- Pitcher / Outfielder
- Born: September 11, 1851; Shirley, Massachusetts, U.S.
- Died: January 11, 1929 (aged 77); Rockford, Illinois, U.S.
- Batted: Right Threw: Right

MLB debut
- May 4, 1875, for the Keokuk Westerns

Last MLB appearance
- September 14, 1878, for the Milwaukee Grays

MLB statistics
- Win–loss record: 10-32
- Earned run average: 2.79
- Batting average: .217
- Stats at Baseball Reference

Teams
- Keokuk Westerns (1875); Chicago White Stockings (1875); Milwaukee Grays (1878)

Career highlights and awards
- Led National League pitchers with four games finished

Michael Henry Golden (September 11, 1851 – January 11, 1929) was an American Major League Baseball player who pitched and played in the outfield for three teams during his two season career.

== Career ==
Born in Shirley, Massachusetts, Golden made his debut on May 4, 1875 for the Keokuk Westerns of the National Association. He was their starting pitcher for all 13 games the team was in the Association, completing all 13, with 113 innings pitched, a 2.79 ERA, and won just one game against 12 losses. When the Westerns folded, he signed with the Chicago White Stockings for the rest of the season. He pitched 119 innings in 14 games pitched for the White Stockings, with a 2.79 ERA, a 6–7 W-L records, 12 complete games, and one shutout. In addition to pitching, he also played 27 games in the outfield. In total, he played in 39 games, hitting .258, and scored 16 runs.

The only other season he played at the top level of professional baseball, and his only "Major League" season, was for the 1878 Milwaukee Grays of the National League. He pitched in 22 games that year, starting 18, and led the league with four games finished. He again played in the outfield when he didn't pitch, playing in a total of 55 games for the Grays, hitting .206, had 3–13 pitching record, and a 4.14 ERA. Golden's career totals include a 10–32 pitching record, a 2.79 ERA, and a .217 batting average in 107 total games played, 49 games as a pitcher.

== Post-career ==
Golden died in Rockford, Illinois at the age of 77, and is interred at Saint Mary and Saint James Cemetery in Rockford.
