= Abner Dalrymple =

American baseball player (1857–1939)

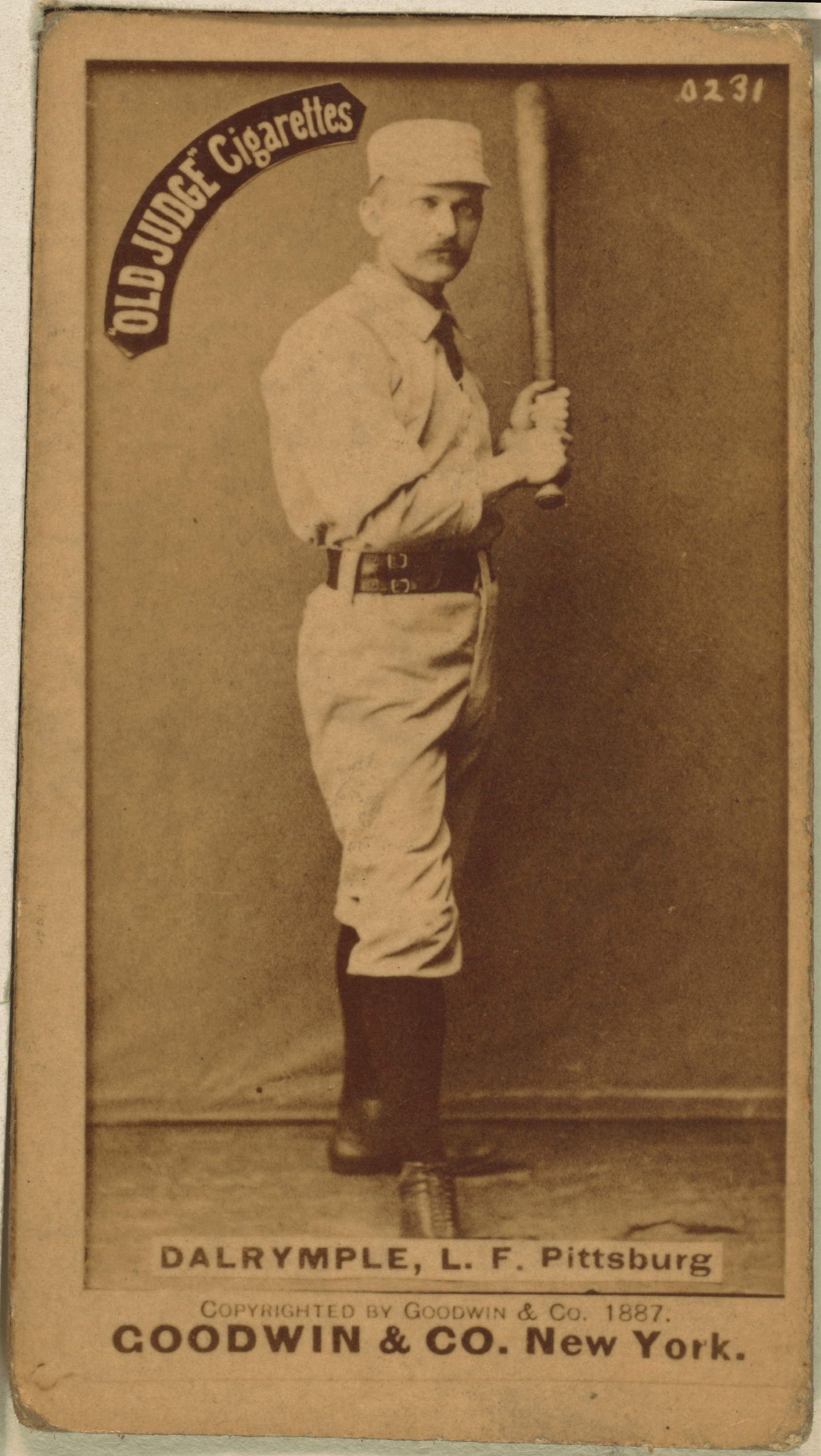
- Left fielder
- Born: September 9, 1857; Gratiot, Wisconsin, U.S.
- Died: January 25, 1939 (aged 81); Warren, Illinois, U.S.
- Batted: Left Threw: Right

MLB debut
- May 1, 1878, for the Milwaukee Grays

Last MLB appearance
- October 2, 1891, for the Milwaukee Brewers

MLB statistics
- Batting average: .288
- Home runs: 43
- Runs batted in: 407
- Stats at Baseball Reference

Teams
- Milwaukee Grays (1878); Chicago White Stockings (1879–1886); Pittsburgh Alleghenys (1887–1888); Milwaukee Brewers (1891)

Career highlights and awards
- NL batting champion (disputed) (1878); NL home run leader (1885)

Abner Frank Dalrymple (September 9, 1857 – January 25, 1939) was an American left fielder in Major League Baseball who hit 43 home runs (including 22 in 1884, the second-highest total to that date) and batted .288 with 407 RBI during his 12-season career spent primarily with the Chicago White Stockings. Born in Gratiot, Wisconsin, he played for the Milwaukee Grays, White Stockings, Pittsburgh Alleghenys, and Milwaukee Brewers.

Dalrymple started his major league career in 1878 with the National League's Milwaukee Grays, and that season, he had a career-high .354 batting average. He spent the next eight seasons with the Chicago White Stockings, for whom he starred as the leadoff hitter on five NL pennant winners. In 1880, Dalrymple led the league in hits (126) and runs scored (91). In 1881, he became the first batter known to be given an intentional walk with the bases loaded. He hit four doubles in a game in 1883, which still ties him for the major league record. In 1884, aided by the short right field fence at his home park, Dalrymple hit a career-high 22 home runs and moved into sixth place on the all-time home run list. On the strength of 11 home runs for the 1885 champions, he moved up one place. For the remainder of his career, he hit only six home runs. His hitting declined in 1886, and his major league career ended five years later.

Dalrymple died in Warren, Illinois at age 81.

== Disputed 1878 NL batting title ==
Dalrymple is sometimes cited as one of only three players in MLB history to win a batting title during his rookie season, a feat which he accomplished in 1878. (The other two were Tony Oliva, in 1964, and Ichiro Suzuki, in 2001). However, Dalrymple's claim to leading the league in hitting in 1878 has since been disputed–– even though the National League initially awarded him the batting crown for that year, further research has suggested that Paul Hines actually had a higher batting average that season (.358 to Dalrymple's .354), once one accounts for hits that were made in tie ballgames (at the time, statistics from tie games weren't counted).

== See also ==
- List of Major League Baseball annual home run leaders
- List of Major League Baseball annual runs scored leaders
- List of Major League Baseball players to hit for the cycle

Achievements
Preceded by Jimmy Ryan	Hitting for the cycle September 12, 1891	Succeeded by Lave Cross
