= Sam Weaver (baseball) =

American baseball player (1855–1914)

- Pitcher
- Born: July 20, 1855; Philadelphia, Pennsylvania, U.S.
- Died: February 1, 1914 (aged 58); Philadelphia, Pennsylvania, U.S.
- Batted: Right Threw: Right

MLB debut
- October 25, 1875, for the Philadelphia White Stockings

Last MLB appearance
- May 29, 1886, for the Philadelphia Athletics

MLB statistics
- Win–loss record: 68-80
- Earned run average: 3.21
- Complete games: 141
- Stats at Baseball Reference

Teams
- Philadelphia White Stockings (1875); Milwaukee Grays (1878); Philadelphia Athletics (1882); Louisville Eclipse (1883); Philadelphia Keystones (1884); Philadelphia Athletics (1886)

Samuel H. Weaver (July 20, 1855 – February 1, 1914) was an American Major League Baseball pitcher who played from 1875 to 1886. He played for the Philadelphia White Stockings, Milwaukee Grays, Philadelphia Athletics, Louisville Eclipse, and Philadelphia Keystones.
