= Milwaukee Grays =

1877-1878 professional baseball team

Information
- Location: Based in Milwaukee, Wisconsin
- Founded: 1877
- Folded: 1878
- Former leagues: National League (1878); League Alliance (1877)
- Former ballpark: Eclipse Park II
- Colors: Gray, white
- Manager: Jack Chapman (1878)

The Milwaukee Grays were a short-lived baseball team that spent one year, 1878, in the National League.

The team was part of the League Alliance, loosely affiliated with the National League, in 1877. It won 19 games and lost 13 (including a 10–7 loss to the Chicago White Stockings of the NL), ending up in fourth place. "The team's sharp style and strong hometown support won them a National League berth in 1878."

They won 15 games and lost 45 in 1878, finishing sixth and last in the league. Their home games were played at Eclipse Park II.

The Grays were managed by former major league right fielder Jack Chapman, whose nickname was "Death to Flying Things." Their best hitter was left fielder Abner Dalrymple, who led the team in batting average (.354), slugging percentage (.421), runs (52), and doubles (10). Their top pitcher was Sam Weaver, who was only 12–31 but had the fourth-best ERA in the league, a very low 1.95.

== Legacy ==
The club is remembered in the name of a vintage base ball club. Along with the Milwaukee Cream Citys, the Grays are dedicated to preserving and presenting the rich history of organized baseball in Milwaukee. Current players wear replica uniforms based upon the original uniforms worn back in 1878. The modern-day Milwaukee Grays are a member of the Vintage Base Ball Association.

== See also ==
- 1878 Milwaukee Grays season
- Milwaukee Grays all-time roster
- Eclipse Park
