= Indianapolis Blues all-time roster =

List of baseball players

The Indianapolis Blues were a professional baseball team based in Indianapolis, Indiana, that played in the National League for one season in 1878. The franchise used South Street Park as their home field. During their only season in existence, the team finished fifth in the NL with a record of 24–36.

== Players ==
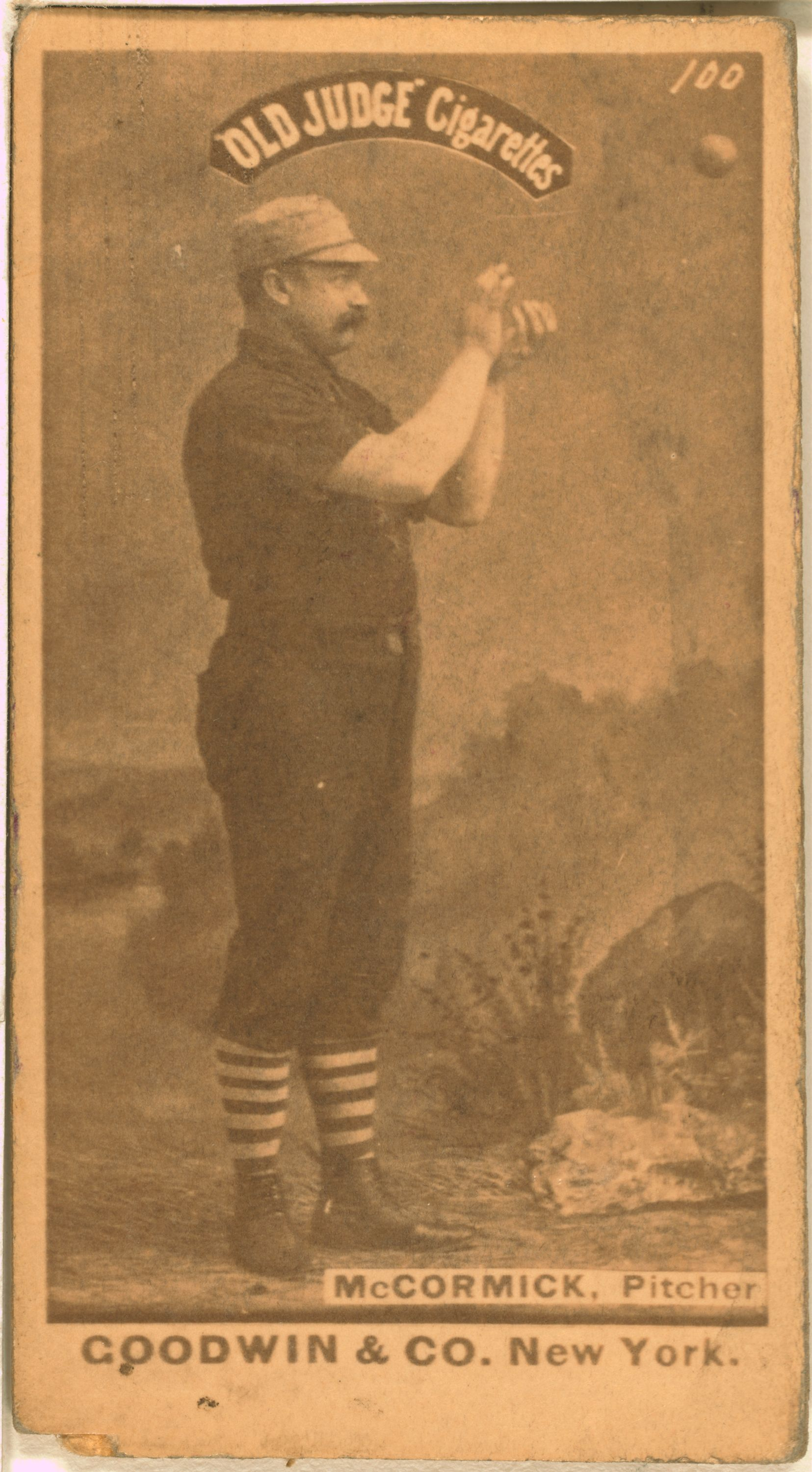
Jim McCormick was one of two Blues players to pitch over 100 innings.

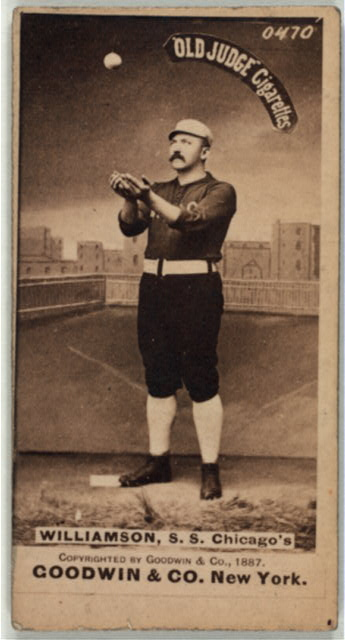
first baseman Ned Williamson started his major league career with the Blues.

Key to symbols in player table
§	Player was a player-manager
†	Inducted into the National Baseball Hall of Fame and Museum

Players who played for the Indianapolis Blues, primary position played, and season(s) played for franchise
Player	Position(s)	Season(s)	Notes	Ref
John Clapp^{§}	Left fielder	1878	Clapp managed the Blues and had a batting average of .304.	
Art Croft	First baseman	1878		
Silver Flint	Catcher	1878		
Jimmy Hallinan	Left fielder	1878		
Tom Healey	Pitcher	1878		
Jim McCormick	Pitcher	1878	McCormick got his major league start with the Blues, and he went on to win 265 games in his career.	
Russ McKelvy	Center fielder	1878		
Candy Nelson	Shortstop	1878		
The Only Nolan	Pitcher	1878	In his first major league season, Nolan led the Blues in innings pitched (347).	
Joe Quest	Second baseman	1878		
Orator Shafer	Right fielder	1878	Shafer led the Blues in batting average (.338) and runs scored (48).	
Fred Warner	Shortstop	1878		
Ned Williamson	Third baseman	1878		
