= 1878 Indianapolis Blues season =

1878 Indianapolis Blues
- League: National League
- Ballpark: South Street Park
- City: Indianapolis, Indiana
- Record: 24–36 (.400)
- League place: 5th
- Manager: John Clapp

The Indianapolis Blues were in the National League for only the 1878 season, after playing as an independent team in 1877. They finished in fifth place, one of just two teams to finish below .500.

== Regular season ==
=== Season standings ===
National League
Team	W	L	Pct.	GB	Home	Road
Boston Red Caps	41	19	.683	—	23‍–‍7	18‍–‍12
Cincinnati Reds	37	23	.617	4	25‍–‍8	12‍–‍15
Providence Grays	33	27	.550	8	17‍–‍13	16‍–‍14
Chicago White Stockings	30	30	.500	11	17‍–‍18	13‍–‍12
Indianapolis Blues	24	36	.400	17	10‍–‍17	14‍–‍19
Milwaukee Grays	15	45	.250	26	7‍–‍18	8‍–‍27

=== Record vs. opponents ===
1878 National League record Sources:
Team	BSN	CHI	CIN	IND	MIL	PRO
Boston	—	8–4	6–6	10–2	11–1	6–6
Chicago	4–8	—	2–10	8–4	10–2	6–6–1
Cincinnati	6–6	10–2	—	4–8–1	8–4	9–3
Indianapolis	2–10	4–8	8–4–1	—	8–4–1	2–10–1
Milwaukee	1–11	2–10	4–8	4–8–1	—	4–8
Providence	6–6	6–6–1	3–9	10–2–1	8–4	—

=== Roster ===
1878 Indianapolis Blues
Roster
Pitchers: Tom Healey; Jim McCormick; The Only Nolan; Catchers: Silver Flint	Infielders: Art Croft; Candy Nelson; Joe Quest; Fred Warner; Ned Williamson	Outfielders: John Clapp; Jimmy Hallinan; Russ McKelvy; Orator Shafer	Manager: John Clapp

== Player stats ==
=== Batting ===
==== Starters by position ====
Note: Pos = Position; G = Games played; AB = At bats; H = Hits; Avg. = Batting average; HR = Home runs; RBI = Runs batted in

Pos	Player	G	AB	H	Avg.	HR	RBI
C	Silver Flint	63	254	57	.224	0	18
1B	Art Croft	60	222	35	.158	0	16
2B	Joe Quest	62	278	57	.205	0	13
3B	Ned Williamson	63	250	58	.232	1	19
SS	Fred Warner	43	165	41	.248	0	10
OF	Orator Shafer	63	266	90	.338	0	30
OF	Russ McKelvy	63	253	57	.225	2	36
OF	John Clapp	63	263	80	.304	0	29

==== Other batters ====
Note: G = Games played; AB = At bats; H = Hits; Avg. = Batting average; HR = Home runs; RBI = Runs batted in

Player	G	AB	H	Avg.	HR	RBI
Candy Nelson	19	84	11	.131	0	5
Jimmy Hallinan	3	12	3	.250	0	1

=== Pitching ===
==== Starting pitchers ====
Note: G = Games pitched; IP = Innings pitched; W = Wins; L = Losses; ERA = Earned run average; SO = Strikeouts

Player	G	IP	W	L	ERA	SO
The Only Nolan	38	347.0	13	22	2.57	125
Jim McCormick	14	117.0	5	8	1.69	36
Tom Healey	11	89.0	6	4	2.22	18

==== Other pitchers ====
Note: G = Games pitched; IP = Innings pitched; W = Wins; L = Losses; ERA = Earned run average; SO = Strikeouts

Player	G	IP	W	L	ERA	SO
Russ McKelvy	4	25.0	0	2	2.16	3
