= List of Major League Baseball annual fielding errors leaders =

Herman Long, the all-time leader in fielding errors.

The following is a list of annual leaders in fielding errors in Major League Baseball (MLB), with separate lists for the American League and the National League. The list also includes several professional leagues and associations that were never part of MLB.

In baseball statistics, an error is an act, in the judgment of the official scorer, of a fielder misplaying a ball in a manner that allows a batter or baserunner to advance one or more bases or allows an at bat to continue after the batter should have been put out.

Herman Long is the all-time leader in errors, committing 1,096 in his career. Long and Billy Shindle hold the record for most fielding errors in a season, with Long committing 122 errors in 1889, and Shindle committing 122 errors the following year in 1890. Javier Báez is the active leader in fielding errors and has led the league 3 times.

== American League ==
Year	Player	Team(s)	Errors
1901	Bill Keister	Baltimore Orioles	97
1902	Billy Gilbert	Baltimore Orioles	78
1903	John Gochnaur	Cleveland Naps	98
1904	Freddy Parent	Boston Americans	63
1905	Joe Cassidy; Freddy Parent	Washington Senators; Boston Americans	66
1906	Freddy Parent	Boston Americans	59
1907	George Rohe	Chicago White Sox	55
1908	Neal Ball	New York Yankees	81
1909	Donie Bush	Detroit Tigers	71
1910	Jack Barry	Philadelphia Athletics	63
1911	Donie Bush	Detroit Tigers	75
1912	Buck Weaver	Chicago White Sox	71
1913	Buck Weaver	Chicago White Sox	70
1914	Buck Weaver	Chicago White Sox	59
1915	Doc Lavan	St. Louis Browns	75
1916	Whitey Witt	Philadelphia Athletics	78
1917	Swede Risberg	Chicago White Sox	61
1918	Doc Lavan	Washington Senators	57
1919	Howie Shanks	Washington Senators	57
1920	Wally Gerber	St. Louis Browns	52
1921	Frank O'Rourke	Washington Senators	55
1922	Joe Sewell	Cleveland Indians	52
1923	Joe Sewell	Cleveland Indians	59
1924	Bill Barrett	Chicago White Sox	45
1925	Ike Davis	Chicago White Sox	53
1926	Mark Koenig	New York Yankees	52
1927	Mark Koenig	New York Yankees	47
1928	Red Kress	St. Louis Browns	55
1929	Joe Cronin	Washington Senators	62
1930	Red Kress	St. Louis Browns	51
1931	Jim Levey	St. Louis Browns	58
1932	Luke Appling	Chicago White Sox	49
1933	Luke Appling	Chicago White Sox	55
1934	Billy Werber	Boston Red Sox	43
1935	Luke Appling	Chicago White Sox	39
1936	Frankie Crosetti	New York Yankees	43
1937	Luke Appling	Chicago White Sox	49
1938	Frankie Crosetti; Buddy Lewis	New York Yankees; Washington Senators	47
1939	Jim Tabor	Boston Red Sox	40
1940	Johnny Berardino	St. Louis Browns	42
1941	Al Brancato	Philadelphia Athletics	61
1942	Vern Stephens	St. Louis Browns	42
1943	Irv Hall; Joe Hoover; John Sullivan	Philadelphia Athletics; Detroit Tigers; Washington Senators	41
1944	John Sullivan	Washington Senators	50
1945	Cass Michaels	Chicago White Sox	47
1946	Luke Appling	Chicago White Sox	39
1947	Eddie Lake	Detroit Tigers	43
1948	Luke Appling	Chicago White Sox	35
1949	Sam Dente	Washington Senators	35
1950	Sam Dente	Washington Senators	34
1951	Ray Boone; Johnny Lipon	Cleveland Indians; Detroit Tigers	33
1952	Bobby Ávila; Ray Boone; Eddie Joost	Cleveland Indians; Cleveland Indians; Philadelphia Athletics	28
1953	Pete Runnels	Washington Senators	26
1954	Milt Bolling	Boston Red Sox	33
1955	Willy Miranda	Baltimore Orioles	34
1956	Luis Aparicio	Chicago White Sox	35
1957	Harvey Kuenn	Detroit Tigers	30
1958	Don Buddin	Boston Red Sox	31
1959	Don Buddin	Boston Red Sox	35
1960	Chico Fernández	Detroit Tigers	34
1961	Dick Howser	Kansas City Athletics	38
1962	Dick McAuliffe	Detroit Tigers	30
1963	Pete Ward	Chicago White Sox	38
1964	Dick McAuliffe	Detroit Tigers	32
1965	Zoilo Versalles	Minnesota Twins	39
1966	Jim Fregosi; Zoilo Versalles	California Angels; Minnesota Twins	35
1967	Bert Campaneris; Zoilo Versalles	Kansas City Athletics; Minnesota Twins	30
1968	Bert Campaneris	Oakland Athletics	34
1969	Jackie Hernández	Kansas City Royals	33
1970	Tommy Harper; Gene Michael	Milwaukee Brewers; New York Yankees	28
1971	Paul Schaal	Kansas City Royals	28
1972	Danny Thompson	Minnesota Twins	32
1973	Rudy Meoli; Paul Schaal	California Angels; Kansas City Royals	30
1974	Dave Chalk	California Angels	34
1975	Robin Yount	Milwaukee Brewers	44
1976	Toby Harrah	Texas Rangers	37
1977	Alan Bannister	Chicago White Sox	40
1978	Butch Hobson	Boston Red Sox	43
1979	Alfredo Griffin	Toronto Blue Jays	36
1980	Alfredo Griffin	Toronto Blue Jays	37
1981	Alfredo Griffin	Toronto Blue Jays	31
1982	Paul Molitor	Milwaukee Brewers	32
1983	U L Washington	Kansas City Royals	36
1984	Julio Franco	Cleveland Indians	36
1985	Julio Franco	Cleveland Indians	36
1986	Dale Sveum	Milwaukee Brewers	30
1987	Rey Quiñones	Seattle Mariners	25
1988	Steve Lyons	Chicago White Sox	29
1989	Félix Fermín	Cleveland Indians	26
1990	Edgar Martínez	Seattle Mariners	27
1991	Carlos Baerga	Cleveland Indians	27
1992	Gregg Jefferies; Mark Lewis	Kansas City Royals; Cleveland Indians	26
1993	Dean Palmer	Texas Rangers	29
1994	Dean Palmer	Texas Rangers	22
1995	Joey Cora	Seattle Mariners	23
1996	José Valentín	Milwaukee Brewers	37
1997	Dave Hollins	Anaheim Angels	29
1998	Mike Caruso	Chicago White Sox	35
1999	Greg Norton	Chicago White Sox	27
2000	José Valentín	Chicago White Sox	36
2001	Shane Halter	Detroit Tigers	26
2002	Nomar Garciaparra	Boston Red Sox	25
2003	Ángel Berroa	Kansas City Royals	24
2004	Ángel Berroa	Kansas City Royals	28
2005	Édgar Rentería	Boston Red Sox	30
2006	Carlos Guillén	Detroit Tigers	28
2007	Jason Bartlett	Minnesota Twins	26
2008	Yuniesky Betancourt	Seattle Mariners	21
2009	Orlando Cabrera	Oakland Athletics; Minnesota Twins	25
2010	Cliff Pennington	Oakland Athletics	25
2011	Mark Reynolds	Baltimore Orioles	31
2012	Asdrúbal Cabrera; Alcides Escobar; Trevor Plouffe	Cleveland Indians; Kansas City Royals; Minnesota Twins	19
2013	Alexei Ramírez	Chicago White Sox	22
2014	Josh Donaldson	Oakland Athletics	23
2015	Marcus Semien	Oakland Athletics	35
2016	Rougned Odor; Kyle Seager	Texas Rangers; Seattle Mariners	22
2017	Tim Anderson	Chicago White Sox	28
2018	Rafael Devers	Boston Red Sox	24
2019	Tim Anderson	Chicago White Sox	26
2020	Rafael Devers	Boston Red Sox	14
2021	Bo Bichette	Toronto Blue Jays	24
2022	Javier Báez	Detroit Tigers	26
2023	Javier Báez; Rafael Devers	Detroit Tigers; Boston Red Sox	19
2024	Gunnar Henderson	Baltimore Orioles	25
2025	Trevor Story; Anthony Volpe	Boston Red Sox; New York Yankees	19
2026	Junior Caminero; Kazuma Okamoto	Tampa Bay Rays; Toronto Blue Jays	21

== National League ==
Year	Player	Team(s)	Errors
1876	Nat Hicks	New York Mutuals	94
1877	Joe Battin; George Wright	St. Louis Brown Stockings; Boston Red Stockings	55
1878	Joe Quest	Indianapolis Blues	60
1879	John Peters	Chicago White Stockings	71
1880	Pop Smith	Cincinnati Reds	89
1881	Deacon White	Buffalo Bisons	70
1882	Arthur Irwin	Worcester Ruby Legs	78
1883	Bob Ferguson; Ned Williamson; Sam Wise	Philadelphia Quakers; Chicago White Stockings; Boston Beaneaters	88
1884	Roger Connor	New York Gothams	96
1885	Tom Burns	Chicago White Stockings	96
1886	Jimmy Knowles	Washington Nationals	81
1887	Sam Wise	Boston Beaneaters	81
1888	John Montgomery Ward	New York Giants	86
1889	Al Myers	Washington Nationals; Philadelphia Quakers	96
1890	Doggie Miller	Pittsburgh Alleghenys	82
1891	Ed McKean	Cleveland Spiders	91
1892	Herman Long	Boston Beaneaters	102
1893	Joe Sullivan	Washington Senators	102
1894	Charlie Irwin	Chicago Colts	91
1895	Bill Dahlen	Chicago Colts	91
1896	Gene DeMontreville	Washington Senators	97
1897	Gene DeMontreville	Washington Senators	91
1898	Monte Cross	Philadelphia Phillies	93
1899	Monte Cross	St. Louis Cardinals	90
1900	Charlie Hickman	New York Giants	87
1901	Bobby Wallace	St. Louis Cardinals	66
1902	Otto Krueger	St. Louis Cardinals	75
1903	Rudy Hulswitt	Philadelphia Phillies	81
1904	Ed Abbaticchio	Boston Beaneaters	78
1905	Ed Abbaticchio	Boston Beaneaters	75
1906	Mickey Doolan	Philadelphia Phillies	66
1907	Ed Holly	St. Louis Cardinals	64
1908	Al Bridwell	New York Giants	55
1909	Tom Downey	Cincinnati Reds	62
1910	Bill Sweeney	Boston Doves	66
1911	Arnold Hauser	St. Louis Cardinals	56
1912	Art Fletcher	New York Giants	53
1913	Mickey Doolan; Bob Fisher	Philadelphia Phillies; Brooklyn Superbas	52
1914	Rabbit Maranville	Boston Braves	65
1915	Ollie O'Mara	Brooklyn Robins	78
1916	Dave Bancroft	Philadelphia Phillies	60
1917	Larry Kopf	Cincinnati Reds	68
1918	Dave Bancroft	Philadelphia Phillies	64
1919	Rabbit Maranville	Boston Braves	53
1920	Ivy Olson	Brooklyn Robins	54
1921	Ivy Olson	Brooklyn Robins	56
1922	Dave Bancroft	New York Giants	62
1923	George Grantham	Chicago Cubs	55
1924	Travis Jackson	New York Giants	58
1925	Heinie Sand	Philadelphia Phillies	60
1926	Heinie Sand	Philadelphia Phillies	55
1927	Doc Farrell	Boston Braves	58
1928	Doc Farrell	Boston Braves	51
1929	Charlie Gelbert	St. Louis Cardinals	46
1930	Tommy Thevenow	Philadelphia Phillies	56
1931	Dick Bartell	Philadelphia Phillies	42
1932	Arky Vaughan	Pittsburgh Pirates	46
1933	Arky Vaughan	Pittsburgh Pirates	46
1934	Mark Koenig	Cincinnati Reds	48
1935	Lonny Frey	Brooklyn Dodgers	44
1936	Lonny Frey	Brooklyn Dodgers	62
1937	Rabbit Warstler	Boston Bees	49
1938	Rabbit Warstler	Boston Bees	49
1939	Billy Myers	Cincinnati Reds	42
1940	Arky Vaughan	Pittsburgh Pirates	52
1941	Pee Wee Reese	Brooklyn Dodgers	47
1942	Eddie Joost	Cincinnati Reds	50
1943	Whitey Wietelmann	Boston Braves	40
1944	Don Johnson	Chicago Cubs	47
1945	Frankie Gustine	Pittsburgh Pirates	41
1946	Billy Cox	Pittsburgh Pirates	39
1947	Frankie Gustine	Pittsburgh Pirates	31
1948	Roy Smalley Jr.	Chicago Cubs	34
1949	Roy Smalley Jr.	Chicago Cubs	39
1950	Roy Smalley Jr.	Chicago Cubs	51
1951	Alvin Dark	New York Giants	45
1952	Granny Hamner	Philadelphia Phillies	38
1953	Granny Hamner	Philadelphia Phillies	37
1954	Alvin Dark	New York Giants	36
1955	Dick Groat	Pittsburgh Pirates	32
1956	Dick Groat	Pittsburgh Pirates	34
1957	Daryl Spencer	New York Giants	37
1958	Daryl Spencer	San Francisco Giants	34
1959	Dick Groat	Pittsburgh Pirates	29
1960	Maury Wills	Los Angeles Dodgers	40
1961	Dick Groat	Pittsburgh Pirates	32
1962	Dick Groat	Pittsburgh Pirates	38
1963	Andre Rodgers	Chicago Cubs	35
1964	Dick Allen	Philadelphia Phillies	41
1965	Jim Ray Hart	San Francisco Giants	34
1966	Sonny Jackson	Houston Astros	37
1967	Dick Allen; Sonny Jackson	Philadelphia Phillies; Houston Astros	35
1968	Don Kessinger	Chicago Cubs	33
1969	Tony Pérez	Cincinnati Reds	32
1970	Tony Pérez	Cincinnati Reds	35
1971	Enzo Hernández; Chris Speier	San Diego Padres; San Francisco Giants	33
1972	Bill Russell	Los Angeles Dodgers	34
1973	Derrel Thomas	San Diego Padres	37
1974	Bill Russell	Los Angeles Dodgers	39
1975	Darrell Evans	Atlanta Braves	36
1976	Darrel Chaney	Atlanta Braves	37
1977	Bill Almon	San Diego Padres	41
1978	Garry Templeton	St. Louis Cardinals	40
1979	Garry Templeton	St. Louis Cardinals	34
1980	Enos Cabell; Garry Templeton	Houston Astros; St. Louis Cardinals	29
1981	Rafael Ramirez	Atlanta Braves	30
1982	Rafael Ramirez	Atlanta Braves	38
1983	Rafael Ramirez	Atlanta Braves	39
1984	Joel Youngblood	San Francisco Giants	37
1985	Rafael Ramirez	Atlanta Braves	32
1986	Shawon Dunston	Chicago Cubs	32
1987	Keith Moreland	Chicago Cubs	28
1988	Bobby Bonilla	Pittsburgh Pirates	32
1989	Bobby Bonilla	Pittsburgh Pirates	35
1990	Howard Johnson	New York Mets	28
1991	Howard Johnson	New York Mets	31
1992	José Offerman	Los Angeles Dodgers	42
1993	José Offerman	Los Angeles Dodgers	37
1994	Andújar Cedeño	Houston Astros	23
1995	José Offerman	Los Angeles Dodgers	35
1996	Walt Weiss	Colorado Rockies	30
1997	Mark Grudzielanek	Montreal Expos	32
1998	Mark Grudzielanek	Montreal Expos; Los Angeles Dodgers	33
1999	Adrián Beltré; Ed Sprague Jr.	Los Angeles Dodgers; Pittsburgh Pirates	29
2000	Desi Relaford	Philadelphia Phillies; San Diego Padres	31
2001	Phil Nevin	San Diego Padres	27
2002	Orlando Cabrera	Montreal Expos	29
2003	Aramis Ramírez	Pittsburgh Pirates; Chicago Cubs	33
2004	Chad Tracy	Arizona Diamondbacks	26
2005	Chad Tracy; David Wright	Arizona Diamondbacks; New York Mets	24
2006	Felipe Lopez	Cincinnati Reds; Washington Nationals	28
2007	Ryan Braun	Milwaukee Brewers	26
2008	Mark Reynolds	Arizona Diamondbacks	35
2009	Mark Reynolds	Arizona Diamondbacks	24
2010	Ian Desmond	Washington Nationals	34
2011	Starlin Castro	Chicago Cubs	29
2012	Pedro Álvarez; Starlin Castro	Pittsburgh Pirates; Chicago Cubs	27
2013	Pedro Álvarez	Pittsburgh Pirates	27
2014	Pedro Álvarez	Pittsburgh Pirates	25
2015	Ian Desmond	Washington Nationals	27
2016	Eugenio Suárez	Cincinnati Reds	23
2017	Orlando Arcia; Dansby Swanson	Milwaukee Brewers; Atlanta Braves	20
2018	José Peraza	Cincinnati Reds	22
2019	Jean Segura	Philadelphia Phillies	20
2020	Donovan Solano	San Francisco Giants	11
2021	Jazz Chisholm Jr. Javier Báez; Luis Urías	Miami Marlins; Chicago Cubs/New York Mets; Milwaukee Brewers	24
2022	Oneil Cruz; Ryan McMahon; Kolten Wong	Pittsburgh Pirates; Colorado Rockies; Milwaukee Brewers	17
2023	Trea Turner	Philadelphia Phillies	23
2024	Elly De La Cruz	Cincinnati Reds	29
2025	Elly De La Cruz	Cincinnati Reds	26
2026	Trea Turner; Otto Lopez	Philadelphia Phillies; Miami Marlins	21

== American Association ==
Year	Player	Team(s)	Errors
1882	Bill Gleason	St. Louis Brown Stockings	85
1883	Cub Stricker	Philadelphia Athletics	95
1884	Billy Geer; Cub Stricker	Brooklyn Atlantics; Philadelphia Athletics	81
1885	Tom McLaughlin	Louisville Colonels	88
1886	Frank Fennelly	Cincinnati Red Stockings	117
1887	Bill McClellan; Ed McKean	Brooklyn Grays; Cleveland Blues	105
1888	Frank Fennelly	Cincinnati Red Stockings	106
1889	Herman Long	Kansas City Cowboys	122
1890	Frank Scheibeck	Toledo Maumees	92
1891	Jim Canavan	Milwaukee Brewers	113

== National Association ==
Year	Player	Team(s)	Errors
1871	Harry Schafer	Boston Red Stockings	59
1872	John Radcliff	Baltimore Canaries	74
1873	Bob Ferguson	Brooklyn Atlantics	110
1874	Jim Holdsworth	Philadelphia White Stockings	98
1875	Nat Hicks	New York Mutuals	81

== Union Association ==
Year	Player	Team(s)	Errors
1884	Lou Say	Kansas City Cowboys	102

== Player's League ==
Year	Player	Team(s)	Errors
1890	Billy Shindle	Philadelphia Athletics	122

== Federal League ==
Year	Player	Team(s)	Errors
1914	Jimmy Esmond	Indianapolis Hoosiers	67
1915	Jimmy Smith	Chicago Whales	70
