= 1878 Major League Baseball season =

1878 MLB season
- League: National League (NL)
- Sport: Baseball
- Duration: May 1 – September 30, 1878
- Games: 60
- Teams: 6

Pennant winner
- NL champions: Boston Red Caps
- NL runners-up: Cincinnati Reds

MLB seasons
- ← 1877 1879 →

Locations of teams for the 1878 National League season
National League

The 1878 major league baseball season was contested from May 1 through September 30, 1878, and saw the Boston Red Caps as the pennant winner of the third season of the National League. There was no postseason.

Over the off-season, in December 1877, two teams would fold: Brooklyn Hartfords and St. Louis Brown Stockings. They were replaced by the Indianapolis Blues and Milwaukee Grays. Later in the offseason, the Providence Grays would join on February 6, raising the number of teams to seven. On April 1 or 2, the Louisville Grays would officially resign from the league, once again lowering the number of teams to six.

== Schedule ==
The 1878 schedule consisted of 60 games for all six teams of the National League. Each team was scheduled to play 12 games against the other five teams in the league. This format had been in place since the previous season, and would be the final season which saw this format, due to expansion to eight teams the following season.

Opening Day took place on May 1 featuring all six teams. The final day of the season was on September 30, featuring a game between the Boston Red Caps and Providence Grays.

== Rule changes ==
The 1878 season saw the following rule changes:

- The National League banned Sunday games for their teams, their home parks, and all NL players.
- A space was made by extending straight lines of the basepaths to the backstop to form a triangle that only the catcher, umpire, and batter were permitted to occupy.
- The team captain now had authority to direct a batting order during the first time through the order; this order must be maintained later in the game.
- The rule giving the home team privilege of batting first was reversed, reverting to captains deciding by coin flip.
- There were to be no timeouts except due to injury to a player or umpire, or due to rain.
- A batter would be declared out if it took longer than a minute to reach the plate.
- No substitute could run for a batter unless the player for whom he was running had been injured in that particular game. Even so, the batter had to reach first base before the substitute/pinch runner could take the batter's place. The opposing captain selected the substitute runner.
- To tag out a runner, a fielder must now keep hold of the baseball.
- The point on the body of a pitcher in which a ball had to pass while pitching was changed from below the hip to below the waist.
- NL teams were no longer able to play outside clubs on their home grounds before or during the season.
- Home Base must be made only of white marble or stone.

== Teams ==
League	Team	City	Ballpark	Capacity	Manager
National League	Boston Red Caps	Boston, Massachusetts	South End Grounds	3,000	Harry Wright
National League	Chicago White Stockings	Chicago, Illinois	Lakefront Park	5,000	Bob Ferguson
National League	Cincinnati Reds	Cincinnati, Ohio	Avenue Grounds	Unknown	Cal McVey
National League	Indianapolis Blues	Indianapolis, Indiana	South Street Park	5,000	John Clapp
National League	Milwaukee Grays	Milwaukee, Wisconsin	Eclipse Park	Unknown	Jack Chapman
National League	Providence Grays	Providence, Rhode Island	Messer Street Grounds	6,000	Tom York

=== Neutral site games ===
Two teams hosted games at neutral sites, the Indianapolis Blues and Providence Grays.

Team	City	Ballpark	Capacity	Games played
Indianapolis Blues	St. Louis, Missouri	Grand Avenue Park	Unknown	3
Indianapolis Blues	Allegheny, Pennsylvania	Union Park	2,500	3
Providence Grays	Brooklyn, New York	Union Grounds	1,500	1

1. In today's Pittsburgh, Pennsylvania.
2. In today's New York, New York.

== Standings ==
=== National League ===
National League
Team	W	L	Pct.	GB	Home	Road
Boston Red Caps	41	19	.683	—	23‍–‍7	18‍–‍12
Cincinnati Reds	37	23	.617	4	25‍–‍8	12‍–‍15
Providence Grays	33	27	.550	8	17‍–‍13	16‍–‍14
Chicago White Stockings	30	30	.500	11	17‍–‍18	13‍–‍12
Indianapolis Blues	24	36	.400	17	10‍–‍17	14‍–‍19
Milwaukee Grays	15	45	.250	26	7‍–‍18	8‍–‍27

=== Tie games ===
Four tie games, which are not factored into winning percentage or games behind occurred throughout the season (though standings were determined by total wins, not winning percentage).

The Indianapolis Blues had three tie games. The Providence Grays had two tie games. The Chicago White Stockings, Cincinnati Reds, and Milwaukee Grays had one tie game each.

- May 7, Milwaukee Grays vs. Indianapolis Blues, tied at 2.
- July 2, Indianapolis Blues vs. Cincinnati Reds, tied at 7.
- August 8, Indianapolis Blues vs. Providence Grays, tied at 8.
- August 13, Chicago White Stockings vs. Providence Grays, tied at 4.

== Managerial changes ==
=== Off-season ===
Team	Former Manager	New Manager
Brooklyn Hartfords	Bob Ferguson	Team folded
Chicago White Stockings	Albert Spalding	Bob Ferguson
Cincinnati Reds	Jack Manning	Cal McVey
Louisville Grays	Jack Chapman	Team folded
St. Louis Brown Stockings	George McManus	Team folded

== League leaders ==
Any team shown in small text indicates a previous team a player was on during the season.

=== National League ===
Hitting leaders
Stat	Player	Total
AVG	Paul Hines^{1} (PRO)	.358
OPS	Paul Hines (PRO)	.849
HR	Paul Hines^{1} (PRO)	4
RBI	Paul Hines^{1} (PRO)	50
R	Dick Higham (PRO)	60
H	Joe Start (CHI)	100

^{1} National League Triple Crown batting winner

Pitching leaders
Stat	Player	Total
W	Tommy Bond (BSN)	40
L	Sam Weaver (MIL)	31
ERA	John Ward (PRO)	1.51
K	Tommy Bond (BSN)	182
IP	Tommy Bond (BSN)	532.2
SV	Tom Healey (IND/PRO)	1
WHIP	Sam Weaver (MIL)	1.023

== Venues ==
Three teams joined the National League, playing at three different venues:

- The Indianapolis Blues played at South Street Park.
- The Milwaukee Grays played at Eclipse Park.
- The Providence Grays played at Messer Street Grounds.

The Chicago White Stockings leave the 23rd Street Grounds (where they played for four seasons since their National Association days from 1874) and move to Lakefront Park where they would play for seven seasons through 1884.

Two teams hosted neutral site games at alternate locations:

- The Indianapolis Blues played two three-game series, the first of which was against the Boston Red Caps on July 9, 11, and 13 in St. Louis, Missouri at the former 1875–1877 home of the St. Louis Brown Stockings at Grand Avenue Park. The second was against the Providence Grays on August 22–24 in Allegheny, Pennsylvania at Union Park, the home of the International Association's Pittsburgh Allegheny.
- The Providence Grays played one game (specifically, game 2 of a three-game series) against the Milwaukee Grays on July 26, specifically due to rain, playing at the Union Grounds in Brooklyn, New York at the former 1877 home of the Brooklyn Hartfords.

== See also ==
- 1878 in baseball (Events, Births, Deaths)
