= Pittsburgh Allegheny (International Association) =

- Allegheny City, Pennsylvania; 1876 – 1878

Minor league affiliations
- Previous leagues: Independent (1876); International Association (1877–1878)

Team data
- Name: Alleghenys; Alleghenies
- Previous parks: Union Park
- Owner/ Operator: Denny McKnight
- Manager: Denny McKnight (1877)

Pittsburgh Allegheny was the name of the first professional baseball club to represent Pittsburgh, Pennsylvania. The team was an unrelated forerunner to the American Association's Pittsburgh Alleghenies that were established in 1882, which continue today as the Pittsburgh Pirates.

== History ==
=== Founding ===
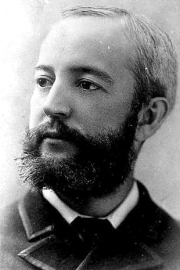
Denny McKnight, future owner and manager of the Pittsburgh Alleghenies, served as team manager in 1877.

Following the American Civil War, the leading baseball clubs in Pittsburgh were the "Enterprise", "Olympic", and "Xantha" teams. They played at Union Park, was located in the city of Allegheny, before it became annexed into Pittsburgh in 1907. On February 2, 1876, Pittsburgh lost its bid for a franchise in the newly established National League. Twenty days later, several local organizers formed the Allegheny Base Ball Club. Allegheny played their first game, defeating the Xanthas 7–3 at Union Park on April 15, 1876.

On February 20, 1877, the International Association was founded in Pittsburgh, and consisted of seven teams that played within Canada and the United States. It is probably the first minor league in baseball history. On February 22, 1877, after a year of playing as an independent club, Allegheny officially joined the new league. The club paid a $25 ($756.00 in 2025 dollars) entry fee and joined the new league.

=== 1877 season ===
The Allegheny would finish the season with a 13–6 record, the second best winning percentage in the league. The club consisted of 12 players in 1877, all of which later made it the majors. No other team in the league used so few players or had a total progression rate to the majors. The manager of the team was Denny McKnight, a lifelong Pittsburgh native who later went on to manage the major league Alleghenies 1884 season for 110 games. McKnight also served as the International Association's president after Candy Cummings resigned.

George Strife played second base for Allegheny in 1878. He would later hit the first-ever home run in Pittsburgh Pirates history in 1882.

Allegheny did make two historic firsts in their brief history. On June 2, 1877, Allegheny played in the first professional game to be decided in 19-innings. That day the club was defeated by a club representing Memphis, Tennessee in the League Alliance. Later that month, on June 20, 1877, Allegheny tied a club representing Indianapolis and the League Alliance, 2–2, in the first game to be decided in 17-innings.

=== 1878 season ===
The league existed for the 1878 season and while none of the players returned to the team, the roster did include future Pittsburgh Alleghenys players; Chappy Lane and George Strief, who would later hit the very first home run in the history of the Pirates franchise. Jack Glasscock, who played shortstop for the 1893–94 Pirates received his start with International Association's Allegheny club as did an 18-year-old pitcher, Mickey Welch. He would go on to win 307 major league games and gain induction into the Baseball Hall of Fame.

=== Demise ===
Despite gaining membership to the International League the following season, the club folded in 1878, unable to compete with the strong, local independent squads like the East Liberty Stars or the Olympics, which were better-rooted in the Pittsburgh neighborhoods and workplaces. Despite a rule prohibiting "a person leaving one club and joining another without proper release" Allegheny was hit hard with player defections and formally folded on June 8, 1878, posting a dismal 3–23 record.

== Team name ==
Having no official nickname, the Allegheny team was commonly referred to by its pluralized city name, i.e., the Alleghenys or Alleghenies.

== Rosters ==
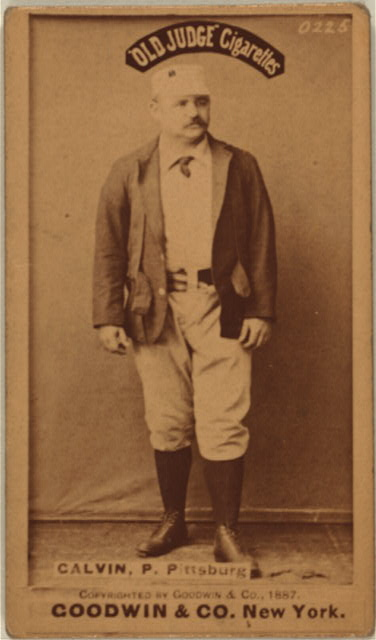
Hall of Famer Pud Galvin pitched for the team in 1877. He later pitched again as a member of the Pittsburgh Alleghenies of the American Association, Pittsburgh Pirates of the National League and the Pittsburgh Burghers of the Players' League.

(from Baseball Reference Bullpen)

1877 Pittsburgh Allegheny
Roster
Pitchers: Pud Galvin *; Russ McKelvy *	Catchers: Tom Dolan; Bill Holbert; Fielders: George Creamer *; Chick Fulmer; Jake Goodman *; Candy Nelson; Al Nichols; Billy West; Johnny Ryan; Ned Williamson	Manager: Denny McKnight *; * Future member of the Pittsburgh Alleghenies/Pirates

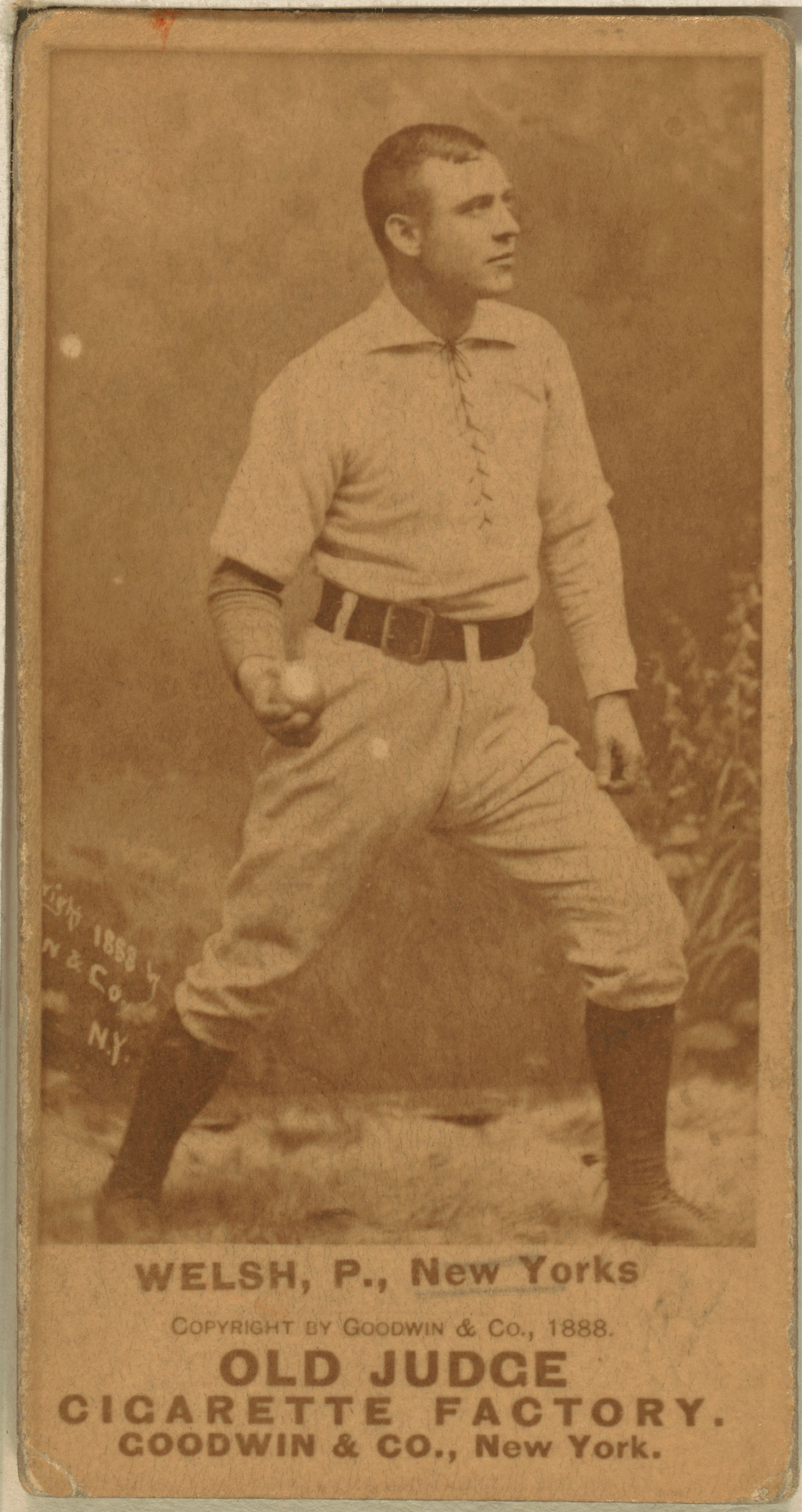
Hall of Famer Mickey Welch pitched for Pittsburgh in 1878, before winning two National League pennants with the New York Giants.

(from Baseball Reference Bullpen)

1878 Pittsburgh Allegheny
Roster
Pitchers: Jim Conway; Mickey Welch	Catchers: Jake Knowdell; Fielders: C. E. Barnard; Jim Clinton; Bill Fouser; Jack Glasscock *; Joseph Hagan; Jim Holdsworth; W. Jenckes; Charles Jerome; Flip Lafferty; Chappy Lane *; Harry Luff; Ed Pond; George Strief *	Manager: Unknown; * Future member of the Pittsburgh Alleghenies/Pirates
