= Allegheny Base Ball Club =

Allegheny Base Ball Club may refer to:

- Pittsburgh Allegheny (International Association), a baseball team existing from 1876 to 1878
- Pittsburgh Pirates, a baseball team established in 1882 as the Allegheny Base Ball Club
