= List of Major League Baseball doubles records =

Major League Baseball has various records related to doubles.

Players denoted in boldface are still actively contributing to the record noted. (r) denotes a player's rookie season.

== 600 career doubles ==
(Through 2023 season)

Player	Doubles	Seasons & Teams
Tris Speaker	792	1907–15 Boston (AL); 16–26 Cleveland; 27 Washington (AL); 28 Philadelphia (AL)
Pete Rose	746	1963–78, 84–86 Cincinnati; 79–83 Philadelphia (NL); 84 Montreal
Stan Musial	725	1941–44, 46–63 St. Louis (NL)
Ty Cobb	724	1905–26 Detroit; 27–28 Philadelphia (AL)
Albert Pujols	686	2001–11, 2022 St. Louis; 2012–2021 Los Angeles (AL); 2021 Los Angeles (NL)
Craig Biggio	668	1988–2007 Houston
George Brett	665	1973–93 Kansas City
Napoleon Lajoie	657	1896–1900 Philadelphia (NL); 01–02, 15–16 Philadelphia (AL); 02–14 Cleveland
Carl Yastrzemski	646	1961–83 Boston (AL)
Honus Wagner	643	1897–99 Louisville (NL); 1900–17 Pittsburgh
Adrian Beltre	636	1998–2004 Los Angeles (NL); 2005–09 Seattle; 10 Boston; 11–18 Texas
David Ortiz	632	1997–2002 Minnesota; 2003–16 Boston (AL)
Miguel Cabrera	627	2003–2007 Florida; 2008–2023 Detroit
Hank Aaron	624	1954–74 Milwaukee-Atlanta; 75–76 Milwaukee
Paul Molitor	605	1978–92 Milwaukee (AL); 93–95 Toronto; 96–98 Minnesota
Paul Waner	605	1926–40 Pittsburgh; 41–42 Boston (NL); 43–44 Brooklyn; 44–45 New York (AL)
Cal Ripken Jr.	603	1981–2001 Baltimore
Barry Bonds	601	1986–1992 Pittsburgh; 1993–2007 San Francisco

=== Top 10 career doubles by league ===
American League Player	Doubles	National League Player	Doubles
Tris Speaker	792	Pete Rose	746
Ty Cobb	724	Stan Musial	725
George Brett	665	Craig Biggio	668
Carl Yastrzemski	646	Honus Wagner	640
David Ortiz	632	Paul Waner	605
Paul Molitor	605		
Cal Ripken Jr.	603	Henry Aaron	600
Robin Yount	583	Todd Helton	592
Wade Boggs	578	Luis Gonzalez	561
Charlie Gehringer	574	Chipper Jones	549

== Doubles in one season ==
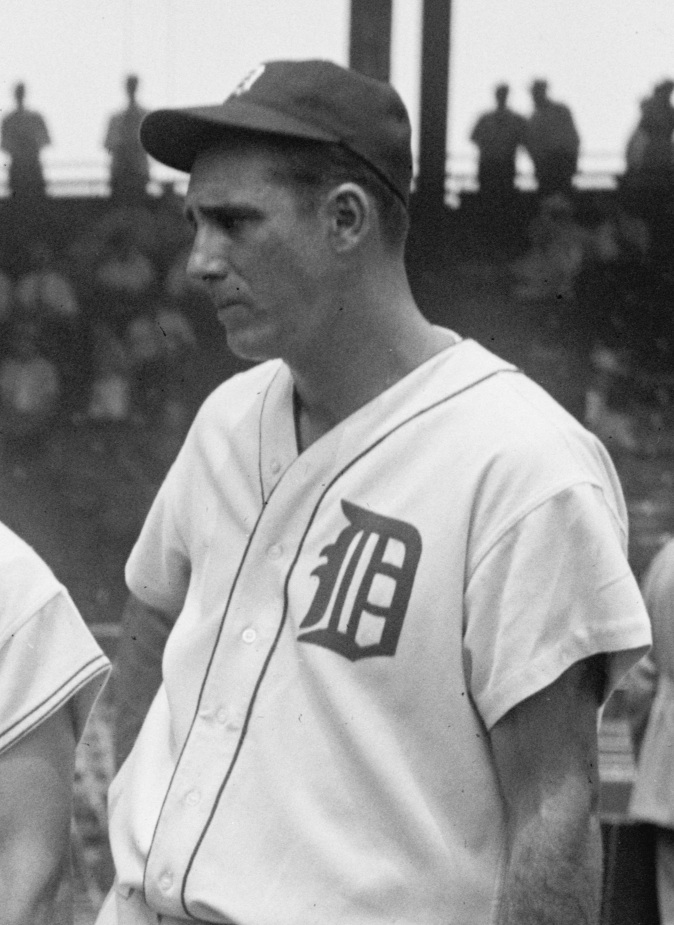
Hank Greenberg, Hall of Famer and 2-time MVP, had 63 doubles in 1934.

Player	Doubles	Team	Season
Earl Webb	67	Boston Red Sox	1931
George H. Burns	64	Cleveland Indians	1926
Joe Medwick	64	St. Louis Cardinals	1936
Hank Greenberg	63	Detroit Tigers	1934
Paul Waner	62	Pittsburgh Pirates	1932
Charlie Gehringer	60	Detroit Tigers	1936
Freddie Freeman	59	Los Angeles Dodgers	2023
Tris Speaker	59	Cleveland Indians	1923
Chuck Klein	59	Philadelphia Phillies	1930
Todd Helton	59	Colorado Rockies	2000
Nicholas Castellanos	58	Detroit Tigers/Chicago Cubs	2019
Billy Herman	57	Chicago Cubs	1935
Billy Herman	57	Chicago Cubs	1936
Carlos Delgado	57	Toronto Blue Jays	2000
Joe Medwick	56	St. Louis Cardinals	1937
George Kell	56	Detroit Tigers	1950
Craig Biggio	56	Houston Astros	1999
Garret Anderson	56	Anaheim Angels	2002
Nomar Garciaparra	56	Boston Red Sox	2002
Brian Roberts	56	Baltimore Orioles	2009
José Ramírez	56	Cleveland Indians	2017
Ed Delahanty	55	Philadelphia Phillies	1899
Gee Walker	55	Detroit Tigers	1936
Lance Berkman	55	Houston Astros	2001
Matt Carpenter	55	St. Louis Cardinals	2013

=== Evolution of the single-season record for doubles ===
Doubles	Player	Team	Year	Years Record Stood
21	Ross Barnes	Chicago White Stockings	1876	2
21	Dick Higham	Hartford Dark Blues	1876	2
21	Paul Hines	Chicago White Stockings	1876	2
22	Dick Higham	Providence Grays	1878	1
31	Charlie Eden	Cleveland Blues	1879	3
37	King Kelly	Chicago White Stockings	1882	1
49	Ned Williamson	Chicago White Stockings	1883	4
52	Tip O'Neill	St. Louis Browns	1887	12
55	Ed Delahanty	Philadelphia Phillies	1899	24
48	Napoleon Lajoie	Philadelphia Athletics	1901	(3)
49	Napoleon Lajoie	Cleveland Bronchos	1904	(6)
51	Napoleon Lajoie	Cleveland Bronchos	1910	(2)
53	Tris Speaker	Boston Red Sox	1912	(11)
59	Tris Speaker	Cleveland Indians	1923	3
64	George H. Burns	Cleveland Indians	1926	5
67	Earl Webb	Boston Red Sox	1931	current

Lajoie's 1901 through Speaker's 1912 records are listed because some baseball historians and publications disregard any record set prior to the "Modern Era" which started in 1901.

=== Multiple seasons with 50 doubles ===
Player	Seasons	Seasons & Teams
Tris Speaker	5	1912 Boston (AL); 20–21, 23, 26 Cleveland
Paul Waner	3	1928, 32, 36 Pittsburgh
Stan Musial	3	1944, 46, 53 St. Louis (NL)
Albert Pujols	3	2003–04 St. Louis (NL); 2012 Los Angeles (AL)
Brian Roberts	3	2004, 08, 09 Baltimore (AL)
George H. Burns	2	1926–27 Cleveland
Chuck Klein	2	1930, 32 Philadelphia (NL)
Charlie Gehringer	2	1934, 36 Detroit
Billy Herman	2	1935–36 Chicago (NL)
Joe Medwick	2	1936–37 St. Louis (NL)
Hank Greenberg	2	1934, 40 Detroit
Edgar Martínez	2	1995–96 Seattle
Craig Biggio	2	1998–99 Houston
Todd Helton	2	2000–01 Colorado
Nomar Garciaparra	2	2000, 02 Boston (AL)
Miguel Cabrera	2	2006 Florida; 14 Detroit

=== Multiple seasons with 40 doubles ===
Player	Seasons	Seasons & Teams
Tris Speaker	10	1912, 14 Boston (AL); 16–17, 20–23, 26 Cleveland; 27 Washington (AL)
Stan Musial	9	1943–44, 46, 48–50, 52–54 St. Louis (NL)
Harry Heilmann	8	191921, 23–27, 29 Detroit; 30 Cincinnati
Wade Boggs	8	1983, 85–91 Boston (AL)
Napoleon Lajoie	7	1897–98 Philadelphia (NL); 1901 Philadelphia (AL); 03-04, 06, 10 Cleveland
Rogers Hornsby	7	1920–22, 24–25 St. Louis (NL); 28 Boston (NL); 29 Chicago (NL)
Lou Gehrig	7	1926–28, 30, 32–34 New York (AL)
Charlie Gehringer	7	1929–30, 32–34, 36–37 Detroit
Joe Medwick	7	1933–39 St. Louis (NL)
Pete Rose	7	1968, 74–76, 78 Cincinnati; 79–80 Philadelphia (NL)
Craig Biggio	7	1993–94, 98–99, 2003–05 Houston
Todd Helton	7	2000–01, 03–07 Colorado
Bobby Abreu	7	2000–02, 2004, 2006–07 Philadelphia (NL); 2010 Los Angeles (AL)
Albert Pujols	7	2001–04, 08–09 St. Louis (NL); 2012 Los Angeles (AL)
Robinson Canó	7	2006–2007, 2009–2013 New York (AL)

== League leader in doubles, 5 or more seasons ==
Player	Titles	Seasons & Teams
Tris Speaker	8	1912, 14 Boston (AL); 16, 18, 20–23 Cleveland
Stan Musial	8	1943–44, 46, 48–49, 53–54 St. Louis (NL)
Honus Wagner	7	1900, 02, 04, 06–09 Pittsburgh
Napoleon Lajoie	5	1898 Philadelphia (NL); 1901 Philadelphia (AL); 04, 06, 10 Cleveland
Pete Rose	5	1974–76, 78 Cincinnati; 80 Philadelphia (NL)

=== League leader in doubles, 3 or more consecutive seasons ===
Player	Titles	Seasons & Teams
Honus Wagner	4	1906–09 Pittsburgh
Tris Speaker	4	1920–23 Cleveland
Dan Brouthers	3	1886–88 Detroit (NL)
Rogers Hornsby	3	1920–22 St. Louis (NL)
Joe Medwick	3	1936–38 St. Louis (NL)
Stan Musial	3	1952–54 St. Louis (NL)
Pete Rose	3	1974–76 Cincinnati
Don Mattingly	3	1984–86 New York (AL)

=== League leader in doubles, both leagues ===
Player	Seasons & Teams
Napoleon Lajoie	1898 Philadelphia (NL); 1901 Philadelphia (AL); 04, 06, 10 Cleveland
Ed Delahanty	1901 Philadelphia (NL); 02 Washington (AL)

=== League leader in doubles, three different teams ===
Player	Seasons & Teams
Napoleon Lajoie	1898 Philadelphia (NL); 1901 Philadelphia (AL); 04, 06, 10 Cleveland

== Four doubles by an individual in one game ==
This record is held by over 50 players. The most recent to be credited with 4 doubles in one game was Brendan Donovan of the St. Louis Cardinals on September 23, 2025, in a game against the San Francisco Giants.

=== Players who have hit 4 doubles in a game twice ===
Two players have twice achieved the feat of hitting four doubles in a game:

Player	Team	Date	Opponent
Billy Werber (2)	Boston Red Sox	July 17, 1935	Cleveland Indians
	Cincinnati Reds	May 13, 1940	St. Louis Cardinals
Albert Belle (2)	Baltimore Orioles	August 29, 1999	Detroit Tigers
	Baltimore Orioles	September 23, 1999	Oakland Athletics

== 350 doubles by a team in one season ==
Doubles	Team	Season
376	Texas Rangers	2008
373	St. Louis Cardinals	1930
373	Boston Red Sox	1997
373	Boston Red Sox	2004
371	Boston Red Sox	2003
363	Boston Red Sox	2013
357	Cleveland Indians	1936
357	Toronto Blue Jays	2003
357	Texas Rangers	2006
356	Cleveland Indians	1930
355	Cleveland Indians	1921
353	St. Louis Cardinals	1931
352	Boston Red Sox	2007
352	Detroit Tigers	2007
352	Boston Red Sox	2022
351	Cleveland Indians	2006

== See also ==
- Baseball statistics
- 20–20–20 club
- List of Major League Baseball career doubles leaders
- List of Major League Baseball annual doubles leaders
