= Chad Tracy (third baseman) =

American baseball player (born 1980)

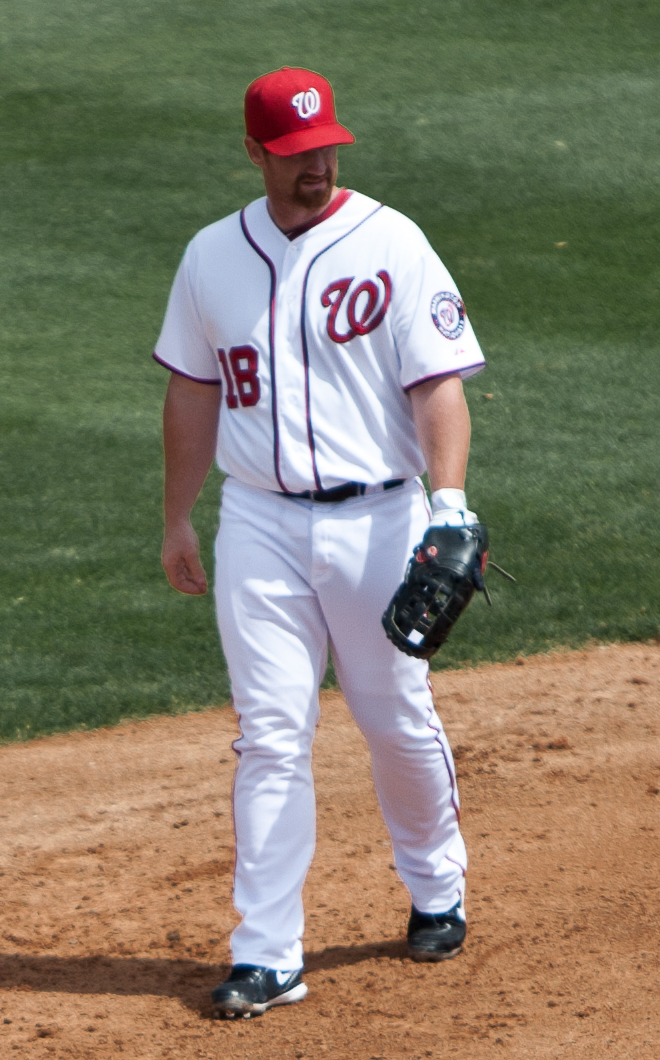
- Tracy with the Washington Nationals during 2012 spring training
- Third baseman / First baseman
- Born: May 22, 1980 (age 46); Charlotte, North Carolina, U.S.
- Batted: Left Threw: Right

Professional debut
- MLB: April 21, 2004, for the Arizona Diamondbacks
- NPB: April 12, 2011, for the Hiroshima Toyo Carp

Last appearance
- NPB: June 5, 2011, for the Hiroshima Toyo Carp
- MLB: September 28, 2013, for the Washington Nationals

MLB statistics
- Batting average: .274
- Home runs: 86
- Runs batted in: 358

NPB statistics
- Batting average: .235
- Home runs: 1
- Runs batted in: 19
- Stats at Baseball Reference

Teams
- Arizona Diamondbacks (2004–2009); Chicago Cubs (2010); Florida Marlins (2010); Hiroshima Toyo Carp (2011); Washington Nationals (2012–2013)

Chad Austin Tracy (born May 22, 1980) is an American former professional baseball third baseman. He played in Major League Baseball (MLB) from 2004 to 2010 and again from 2012 to 2013 for the Arizona Diamondbacks, Chicago Cubs, Florida Marlins, and Washington Nationals. He also played for the Hiroshima Toyo Carp of Nippon Professional Baseball (NPB).

== Amateur career ==
Tracy attended West Mecklenburg High School in Charlotte, North Carolina, and East Carolina University, where he played college baseball for the East Carolina Pirates. He compiled a .339 batting average during his career at East Carolina. In 2000, he played collegiate summer baseball with the Orleans Cardinals of the Cape Cod Baseball League and was named a league all-star.

== Professional career ==
=== Minor league career ===
The Arizona Diamondbacks selected Tracy in the seventh round of the 2001 Major League Baseball draft. He played third base in El Paso, Texas, for the El Paso Diablos. In four minor league seasons, Tracy hit .335 with 24 home runs, 85 doubles, and 206 runs batted in (RBIs) in 337 games. In 2002, he was selected to participate in the All-Star Futures Game during the All-Star break as the starting third baseman on the U.S. squad.

=== Arizona Diamondbacks ===
==== 2004–08 ====
Tracy made his major league debut with Arizona in 2004. He finished his rookie season with a .285 average, eight home runs, 53 RBIs, and a .343 on-base percentage in 143 games. He led NL third basemen with 25 errors and his .935 fielding percentage was the lowest among all qualified major league fielders.

In 2005, Tracy had a breakout season, as he batted .308 (7th-best in the league) with 27 home runs and 72 RBIs. He also had a slugging percentage of .533, 10th-best in the NL.

Tracy's numbers dipped in the 2006 season. He batted .281 with 20 homers and 80 RBIs. His slugging percentage went down over 100 points from his 2005 total, going from .553 to .451. His strikeouts went up to 129, compared to 78 in 2005. He also tied Edwin Encarnación for the major league lead in errors by a third baseman with 25. He matched his poor .935 fielding percentage from 2004, this year better than only Encarnación.

His numbers dipped again in 2007, as he batted .264—the lowest batting average of his major league career. In 2008, he had his lowest on-base percentage (.308) and slugging percentage (.414) of his major league career, as he batted .267.

==== 2009 ====
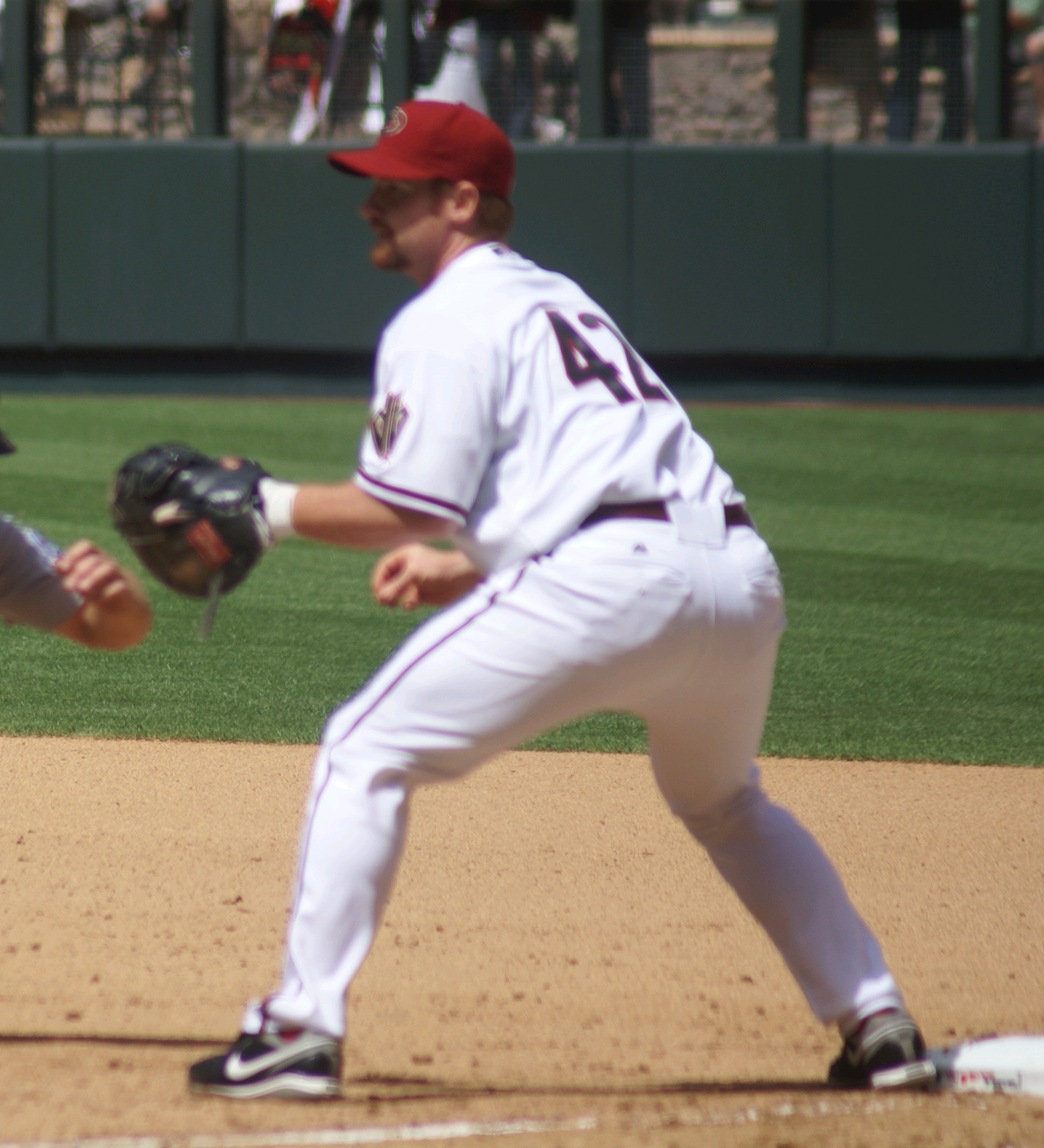
Tracy playing for the Arizona Diamondbacks in 2009.

On May 6, 2009, Tracy (who was batting .224) was replaced in the starting lineup by Josh Whitesell, who was called up to the Diamondbacks after hitting .356/.477/.552 for the Reno Aces. Manager Bob Melvin said Whitesell would get a chance to play every day, and that Tracy "is going to pinch hit, (and) he's going to fill in at third and first for a while." That did not last long, however, as on May 19, not even two weeks later, Melvin had been fired as manager and the team optioned Whitesell back to Reno.

A right-oblique strain that Tracy suffered May 29 led to him being placed on the 15-day disabled list. Tracy came off the disabled list after missing all of June.

Tony Clark was released in mid-July, and Whitesell was called back up for the third time in the season to replace him on July 16. Tracy said:

Obviously, I want the playing time, I want to be out there every day. Right now, there are a lot of question marks, especially for me, and some of the other guys that are on their last year of their contract or have some value to be traded, so I think we're probably at that point now where anything can happen. I wouldn't be surprised by anything.

Manager A.J. Hinch spoke with Tracy, who was batting a career-low .222 with a .288 on-base percentage at the time, and Whitesell on July 17. He told them that Whitesell would get the bulk of the action at first base, starting four or five times a week "for the time being". After the 2009 season, the Diamondbacks did not pick up Tracy's $7 million option for 2010, making him a free agent.

=== Chicago Cubs, New York Yankees, and Florida Marlins ===
On January 26, 2010, Tracy signed a minor league contract with the Chicago Cubs with an invite to spring training. The deal was announced on January 27, 2010. On March 29, the Cubs announced that Tracy had made the Cubs' 25 man roster. On May 7, Tracy was sent down to the Triple-A Iowa Cubs to make room for Starlin Castro. Tracy was designated for assignment by the Cubs on June 25 and released on July 1.

Tracy signed with the New York Yankees on July 9, 2010, and he was assigned to the Scranton/Wilkes-Barre Yankees but eventually opted out of his contract, making him a free agent.

Tracy signed with the Florida Marlins on August 5, 2010. He played in 41 games for the Marlins, batting .245 with 1 home run.

=== Hiroshima Toyo Carp ===
Tracy signed with the Hiroshima Toyo Carp of Nippon Professional Baseball to play the 2011 season. In 40 games, he batted .235 with 1 home run.

=== Washington Nationals ===
Tracy signed a minor league contract with the Washington Nationals in the spring of 2012. He showed enough improvement at the plate during spring training to make the club's opening day roster. He was made a member of the Nationals' bench, where he was a productive left-handed bat. In his first season in 2012, he hit .269, but declined to just .202 in 2013, his final season for the Nationals.

=== Retirement ===
Tracy signed a minor league deal with the Los Angeles Angels of Anaheim on January 29, 2014. He was released on March 23. On April 26, Tracy announced his retirement from baseball.

== Personal life ==
Tracy and his wife have four daughters. Their daughter Ella committed to play college softball at East Carolina. Tracy has coached several of Ella's softball teams in North Carolina.

== See also ==
- Arizona Diamondbacks award winners and league leaders
- List of Major League Baseball annual fielding errors leaders
- List of Major League Baseball players with a home run in their final major league at bat

| Preceded by Ty Wigginton | Topps Rookie All-Star Third Baseman; 2004 | Succeeded by Garrett Atkins |
