= The Only Nolan =

Canadian baseball player (1857–1913)

- Pitcher
- Born: November 7, 1857; Trenton, Canada West, Province of Canada
- Died: May 18, 1913 (aged 55); Paterson, New Jersey, U.S.
- Batted: Left Threw: Right

MLB debut
- May 1, 1878, for the Indianapolis Blues

Last MLB appearance
- October 9, 1885, for the Philadelphia Quakers

MLB statistics
- Win–loss record: 23–52
- Earned run average: 2.98
- Strikeouts: 274
- Stats at Baseball Reference

Teams
- Indianapolis Blues (1878); Cleveland Blues (1881); Pittsburgh Alleghenys (1883); Wilmington Quicksteps (1884); Philadelphia Quakers (1885)

Edward Sylvester "The Only" Nolan (November 7, 1857 – May 18, 1913) was a Canadian professional baseball pitcher and outfielder who played for five Major League Baseball (MLB) teams from 1878 to 1885.

== Family ==
Although Nolan was raised in Paterson, New Jersey, and the 1900 census shows his birthplace as New Jersey, both the 1870 and 1880 censuses indicate that he and his three older brothers (John, Mills, and Michael) were born in Canada. His parents were James and Mary Nolan, who were both born in Ireland.

Nolan married Mary Coyle around 1882, and they had two children, Marguerita (born 1891) and Edward (born 1895).

== Baseball career ==
According to Bill James and Rob Neyer, Nolan threw an unusually fast (for his day) underhand fastball and a combination of curveballs.

Nolan started his professional baseball career with the Indianapolis Blues of the League Alliance in 1877. He pitched well that season and stayed with the team when they moved to the National League (NL) in 1878.

Nolan received his nickname in 1878. In that era, "the only" was a common term used to describe anyone who excelled at something. Upon joining the NL, the Blues publicized themselves by referring to their main pitcher Nolan as "The Only Nolan".

That season, Nolan pitched 347 innings, the most of his MLB career. He had a win–loss record of 13–22 and had the fifth-most wins in the NL. He had a 2.57 earned run average (ERA) and an 80 ERA+, and he led the league with 56 bases on balls.

Nolan was expelled by Indianapolis on August 14 when he told the team he was going to a funeral but instead went drinking. During the league meetings in December, his appeal for reinstatement was denied.

Nolan then played for minor league teams in San Francisco in 1879 and 1880.

In 1881, Nolan was allowed to return to the NL, this time with the Cleveland Blues. On July 23, he pitched Cleveland to a 7–3 win over the Buffalo Bisons and went 4-for-4 at the plate. Nolan and his teammates John Clapp and Jim McCormick missed the team's September 20 game in Worcester, Massachusetts, because their return from a side trip to New York City was delayed by a train wreck; they were each fined $100.

At an NL meeting in Saratoga Springs, New York later that month, the league adopted a blacklist of players who were barred from playing for or against any NL teams until they were removed by unanimous vote of the league clubs. Nolan was one of the ten blacklisted for "confirmed dissipation and general insubordination". The other nine were Lew Brown‚ Ed Caskin, Bill Crowley‚ Buttercup Dickerson‚ Mike Dorgan‚ John Fox‚ Emil Gross‚ Sadie Houck‚ and Lip Pike.

In 1883, Nolan pitched in seven games, all losses, for the Pittsburgh Alleghenys before being released for disciplinary reasons. He played professionally for the next several years, including stints with the Wilmington Quicksteps and Philadelphia Quakers, until his baseball career ended in 1886.

== Later life ==
After retiring from baseball, Nolan worked for the Paterson, New Jersey Police Department. He worked there for about 15 years before he suddenly became ill and died of nephritis at the age of 55. He was interred at the Holy Sepulchre Cemetery in Totowa, New Jersey.
