= Charley horse =

Non-specific term for muscle cramp

- Other names: Charley, Charley-horse, charlie horse, leg cramp
- Specialty: Sports medicine

Charley horse is a term that typically refers to a muscle cramp, stiffness, or contusion. Generally it is used for the thigh, calf, or foot, or more rarely, the arm. In British English the term may be used interchangeably with leg cramp, dead leg or thigh contusion.

== Etymology ==
The term came into use in the setting of baseball in the United States in the 1880s, though its exact origin is uncertain.

The first known written use of the term was in 1886 in The Boston Globe. The origination has been attributed to two baseball players, Jack Glasscock and Joe Quest. However, its exact origins are unknown.

== Other references ==
- Shulman D (1949). "Whence "Charley Horse"?". American Speech. 24 (2): 100–104. doi:10.2307/486616. JSTOR 486616.
- Tonbridge SV (1950). ""Charley Horse" Again". American Speech. 25 (1): 70.
- Woolf HB (1973). "Mencken as Etymologist: Charley Horse and Lobster Trick". American Speech. 48 (3/4): 229–238. doi:10.2307/3087830. JSTOR 3087830.
