= John Clapp (baseball) =

American baseball player-manager (1851–1904)

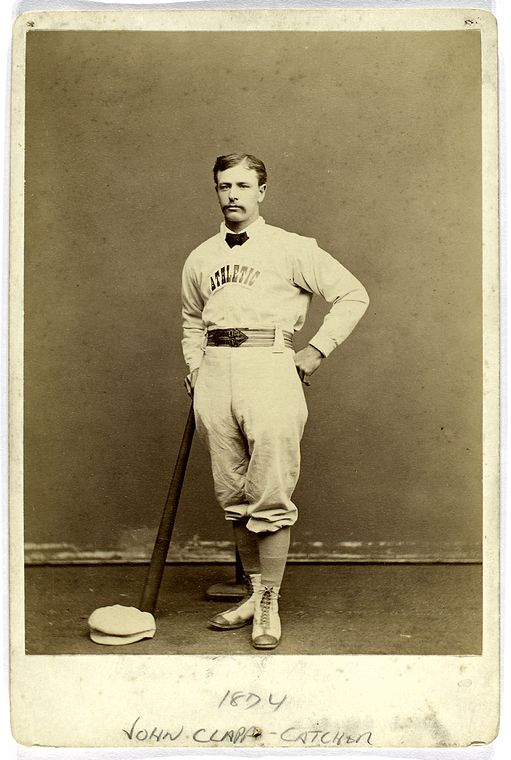
- Catcher / Manager
- Born: July 15, 1851; Ithaca, New York, U.S.
- Died: December 18, 1904 (aged 53); Ithaca, New York, U.S.
- Batted: Right Threw: Right

MLB debut
- April 26, 1872, for the Middletown Mansfields

Last MLB appearance
- September 28, 1883, for the New York Gothams

MLB statistics
- Batting average: .283
- Home runs: 7
- Runs batted in: 275
- Managerial record: 174–273
- Stats at Baseball Reference

Teams
- As player: Middletown Mansfields (1872); Philadelphia Athletics (1873–1875); St. Louis Brown Stockings (1876–1877); Indianapolis Blues (1878); Buffalo Bisons (1879); Cincinnati Stars (1880); Cleveland Blues (1881); New York Gothams (1883); As manager: Middletown Mansfields (1872); Indianapolis Blues (1878); Buffalo Bisons (1879); Cincinnati Stars (1880); Cleveland Blues (1881); New York Gothams (1883)

John Edgar Clapp (July 15, 1851 – December 18, 1904), nicknamed "Honest John", was an American professional baseball player-manager whose career spanned 12 seasons, 11 of which were spent with the Major League Baseball (MLB) Middletown Mansfields (1872), Philadelphia Athletics (1873–75), St. Louis Brown Stockings (1876–77), Indianapolis Blues (1878), Buffalo Bisons (1879), Cincinnati Stars (1880), Cleveland Blues (1881), and New York Gothams (1883). Clapp, who predominately played as a catcher, also played as an outfielder. Over his career, Clapp compiled a career batting average of .283 with 459 runs scored, 713 hits, 92 doubles, 35 triples, 7 home runs, and 834 runs batted in (RBI). Over 1,188 games played, Clapp struck out 51 times. Although the majority of his career was spent in the major leagues, Clapp also played two seasons of minor league baseball. He made his MLB debut at the age of 21 and was listed as standing 5 feet 7 inches (170 cm) and weighing 194 pounds (88 kg). His brother, Aaron Clapp, also played one season of MLB for the Troy Trojans.

== Early life ==
John Edgar Clapp was born on July 15, 1851, in Ithaca, New York.

== Professional career ==
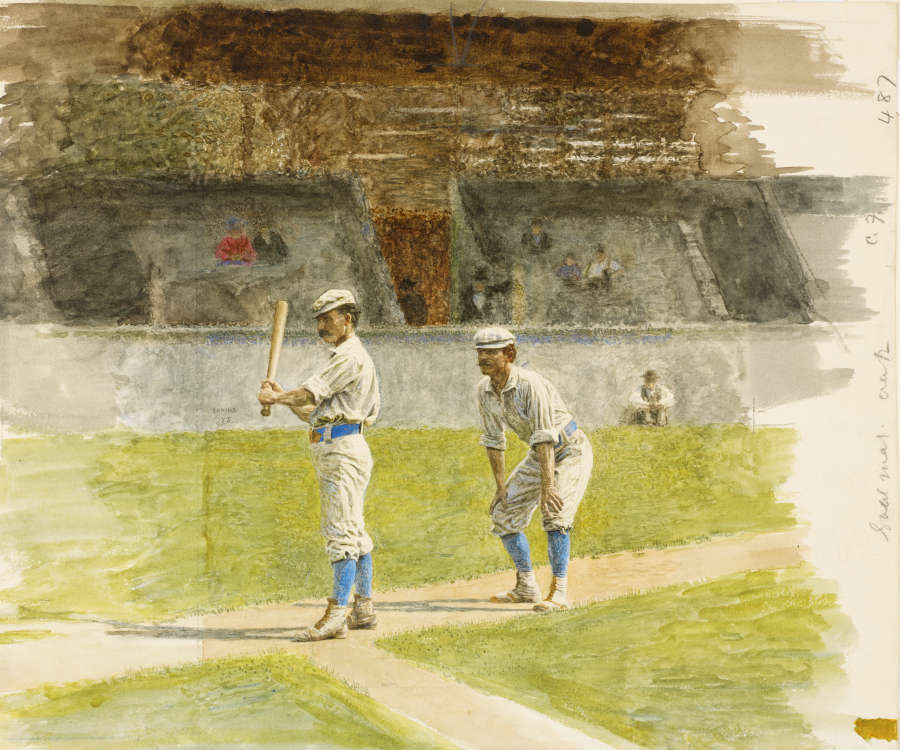
"Baseball Players Practicing" (1875) by Thomas Eakins depicting Athletic's Wes Fisler at bat and Clapp catching at Jefferson Street Grounds

In 1872, Clapp began his professional career with the Middletown Mansfields of the National Association of Professional Base Ball Players (NA). Over 19 games played, Clapp batted .278 with one home run and a team-high 30 runs scored while managing the team to a 5–19 record. After the team folded, Clapp joined the Philadelphia Athletics. His single home run tied him for the team-lead along with Wes Fisler, Cherokee Fisher, and Tim Murnane. Next season, in 1874, Clapp led the NA in at bats per home run (55); his OPS (.732) was a career-high, while the Athletics finished the season 33–22, third in the NA, under manager Dick McBride. In his final year with the club, Clapp batted .264 with 77 hits and 39 RBI. His putout total was second in the NA among catchers.

In 1876, Clapp joined the St. Louis Brown Stockings of the National League (NL). He finished the year tied for the team lead in games played (64) and hits (91), while he led the NL in putouts as a catcher, with 333. Next season, Clapp batted a career high .318, while his on-base percentage and on-base plus slugging percentages were the second highest in his career. In the field, Clapp committed 40 errors as a catcher, second highest in the NL to Lew Brown's 49. After leaving the team, Clapp joined the Indianapolis Blues, where he served as a player-manager for the 1878 season. Playing primarily in the outfield, Clapp was tied for the MLB lead in games played along with Indianapolis teammates Silver Flint, Russ McKelvy, Orator Shafer, and Ned Williamson.

After his one-year stint with the Blues, Clapp joined the Buffalo Bisons. Playing in 70 games, Clapp managed the team to a 46–32 record, placing the Bisons third in the NL. On June 25 of that year, Clapp ended a streak of 212 consecutive games played, serving primarily as a catcher. In 1880, now playing and managing for the Cincinnati Stars, Clapp played in a total of 80 games, a career high, while leading the team to a 21–59 record. He played for the Cleveland Blues in 1881, when he earned the nickname "Honest": in May, a Chicago bookmaker named James S. Woodruff offered Clapp $5,000 ($166,810.34 in 2011) to allow a passed ball with runners on base, and also wanted to be informed which games to bet on when the moves would take place. Clapp reported him to the Chicago police, which led to Woodruff's arrest. In 1882, after leading the NL in walks, Clapp made his minor-league debut for the New York Metropolitans of the League Alliance. In 1883, his last MLB season, Clapp played for and managed the New York Gothams for their inaugural season. Clapp, then 34, spent his final professional season with the St. Paul Apostles, where he batted .180 with 11 hits and a double.

== After baseball ==
After retiring from baseball, Clapp served as a night sergeant in his hometown of Ithaca, New York. He died at midnight on December 18, 1904, of apoplexy. Clapp was interred at Lake View Cemetery in Ithaca.

== See also ==
- List of Major League Baseball player–managers
