= Jimmy Hallinan =

Irish baseball player (1849–1879)

- Shortstop
- Born: May 27, 1849; Ireland
- Died: October 28, 1879 (aged 30); Chicago, Illinois, US
- Batted: Left Threw: Left

MLB debut
- July 26, 1871, for the Fort Wayne Kekiongas

Last MLB appearance
- August 22, 1878, for the Indianapolis Blues

MLB statistics
- Batting average: .287
- Home runs: 5
- Runs batted in: 83
- Stats at Baseball Reference

Teams
- National Association of Base Ball Players Aetna of Chicago (1869-1870) League player Fort Wayne Kekiongas (1871) Keokuk Westerns (1875) New York Mutuals (1875–1876) Cincinnati Reds (1877) Chicago White Stockings (1877–1878) Indianapolis Blues (1878)

James H. Hallinan (May 27, 1849 – October 28, 1879) was an Irish born professional baseball player. In the first professional league season, he played shortstop in five games for the 1871 Fort Wayne Kekiongas. He returned to professional play four years later and worked as a regular player for five teams in four major league seasons, including two as the regular shortstop of the New York Mutuals.

== Early years ==
Hallinan began his baseball career in 1870 with the amateur Aetna Club of Chicago, and played shortstop for four seasons with that club. During that stretch, he played a few professional games for the 1871 Fort Wayne Kekiongas of the National Association.

== Major league career ==
Hallinan did not play professional baseball again until he joined the Westerns of Keokuk, Iowa in 1875. He played every inning of their 13 games at shortstop and, when the Westerns folded, moved on to the New York Mutuals for the remainder of that season and all of 1876, when the Mutuals were a founding member of the National League. His two home runs ranked third in the league. With three in 1875 he had ranked fourth in the NA. The Clipper observed that he, "being remarkably fleet of foot, was often credited with home runs."

Hallinan playing sparingly for the Cincinnati Reds in 1877. When the Reds disbanded during business troubles, it looked as if the team was going to fold; he and Charley Jones agreed to sign and play with the Chicago White Stockings. The Reds eventually corrected their situation, and asked for their two players back. The two teams agreed that Jones would return to the Reds while Hallinan would remain with the White Stockings.

During July of 1878, Hallinan became too ill to play, which forced him to quit. Although he returned to the field later in August for the Indianapolis Blues, he was only able to participate in three games. Although he was a better than average hitter, he lacked skill in the field. For his career, he hit .287 in 170 games, but in his 111 games at shortstop, he totaled 161 errors for a .744 fielding percentage. He didn't fare much better in his games in the outfield or at second base, as his career total was .756. Early in his career, he spent most of his playing time at shortstop, but he was later moved to the outfield.

== Death ==
It is alleged that the reason Hallinan became too ill to play was most likely due from overuse of alcohol. In October of the following year, he succumbed to inflammation of the bowels and died at 30 years of age in Chicago. He was interred at the Calvary Catholic Cemetery in Evanston, Illinois.

== See also ==
- List of players from Ireland in Major League Baseball
