= Frederick Westervelt =

American baseball umpire (1878-1955)

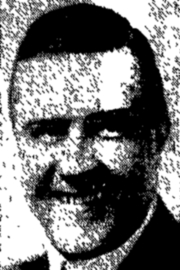
- Born: Frederick Euphenia Westervelt; February 18, 1878; Hackensack, New Jersey, U.S.
- Died: May 4, 1955 (aged 77); Drexel Hill, Pennsylvania, U.S.
- Occupation: Umpire
- Years active: 1911-1912 (AL), 1915 (FL), 1922-1923 (NL)
- Employer(s): American League, Federal League, National League

Frederick Euphenia Westervelt (February 18, 1878 – May 4, 1955) was an American professional baseball umpire who worked in three major leagues for parts of five years. Westervelt umpired in the American League in 1911 and 1912, the Federal League in 1915 and the National League in 1922 and 1923. He umpired 345 major league games. He was a relative of Giants' pitcher, Huyler Westervelt.
