= Art Croft =

American baseball player (1855–1884)

- First baseman/Left fielder
- Born: January 23, 1855; St. Louis, Missouri
- Died: March 16, 1884 (aged 29); St. Louis, Missouri
- Batted: Unknown Threw: Unknown

MLB debut
- May 5, 1875, for the St. Louis Red Stockings

Last MLB appearance
- September 13, 1878, for the Indianapolis Blues

MLB statistics
- Games played: 133
- Runs scored: 50
- Batting average: .195
- Stats at Baseball Reference

Teams
- St. Louis Red Stockings (1875); St. Louis Brown Stockings (1877); Indianapolis Blues (1878)

Arthur F. Croft (January 23, 1855 – March 16, 1884) was an American Major League Baseball player. He played for three teams during three-year professional and Major League career.

== Career ==
Born in St. Louis, Missouri, Croft began his professional career in 1875 when he joined the St. Louis Red Stockings of the National Association. He played in 19 games that season, all of which he played in the outfield, and batted .200 in 75 at bats.

His next season, in 1877, when he joined the St. Louis Brown Stockings of the National League, and played in 54 of the team's 60 games. He split his playing time between first base and left field, and hit a career high .232, while scoring 23 runs, and had 27 RBIs.

The following season, 1878, Croft joined the Indianapolis Blues, also of the National League, his last season in the Major Leagues. He played in all 60 of the team's games as the starting first baseman. He batted .158 in 222 at bats, and scored 22 runs.

Croft finished his three-year career with a .195 batting average in 139 games, scored 50 runs, 45 RBIs, and hit 14 doubles. He died in St. Louis on March 16, 1884 at the age of 29 of Typhoid Pneumonia, and is interred at Calvary Cemetery in St. Louis.
