= Indianapolis Blues =

Former Major League Baseball team

Information
- Location: Based in Indianapolis, Indiana
- Founded: 1878
- Folded: 1878
- Former league: National League
- Former ballpark: South Street Park
- Colors: Blue, white
- Manager: John Clapp

The Indianapolis Blues were a baseball team in the National League for one season (1878), in which they finished fifth in the six-team league with a 24–36 record. They were managed by outfielder/first baseman/catcher John Clapp, and played their home games at South Street Park. They had been brought into the League from the League Alliance following their 1877 season.

Their top-hitting regular was right fielder Orator Shafer, who batted .338 with a slugging percentage of .455. Their most successful pitcher was The Only Nolan (13–22, 2.57), but had two other starters with better ERAs: Jim McCormick (5–8, 1.69) and Tom Healey (6–4, 2.22).

== Roster ==
- John Clapp
- Art Croft
- Silver Flint
- Jimmy Hallinan
- Tom Healey
- Jim McCormick
- Russ McKelvy
- Candy Nelson
- The Only Nolan
- Joe Quest
- Orator Shafer
- Fred Warner
- Ned Williamson

== See also ==
- 1878 Indianapolis Blues season
- Indianapolis Blues all-time roster
