= Orator Shafer =

American baseball player (1851–1922)

- Right fielder
- Born: October 4, 1851; Philadelphia, Pennsylvania, U.S.
- Died: January 21, 1922 (aged 70); Philadelphia, Pennsylvania, U.S.
- Batted: Left Threw: Right

MLB debut
- May 23, 1874, for the Hartford Dark Blues

Last MLB appearance
- September 13, 1890, for the Philadelphia Athletics

MLB statistics
- Batting average: .282
- Home runs: 11
- Runs batted in: 317
- Stats at Baseball Reference

Teams
- Hartford Dark Blues (1874); New York Mutuals (1874); Philadelphia Whites (1875); Louisville Grays (1877); Indianapolis Blues (1878); Chicago White Stockings (1879); Cleveland Blues (1880–1882); Buffalo Bisons (1883); St. Louis Maroons (1884–1885); Philadelphia Athletics (1885–1886, 1890)

Career highlights and awards
- 1879: Set the MLB record for assists by an outfielder (50); 1884: Led the Union Association in doubles (40)

George W. Shafer [sometimes spelled Shaffer or Schaefer] (October 4, 1851 – January 21, 1922) was an American outfielder in Major League Baseball. Nicknamed "Orator", because he was an avid speaker, Shafer played for 10 teams in four different major leagues between 1874 and 1890. Though he was a good hitter who batted over .300 three times, Shafer was best known for his defensive abilities. He led the National League's outfielders in assists four times. In 1879, he set an MLB single-season record with 50 outfield assists, which is a mark that has stood for over 130 years. He was considered by some to be the greatest right fielder of his era.

Shafer was 5 feet 9 inches (1.75 m) tall and weighed 165 pounds (75 kg).

== Background ==
Shafer was born in Philadelphia, Pennsylvania, in 1851. He was a "promising young Philadelphia amateur" before starting his professional baseball career in 1874 in the National Association. That year, he played in nine games for the Hartford Dark Blues and in one game for the New York Mutuals, with a cumulative batting average of .225. His fielding percentage was a career-low .710. The following season, he played 19 games for the Philadelphia Whites and batted .243.

Shafer was known during his playing career by the nickname "Orator". According to Alfred Henry Spink, founder of The Sporting News, he received the nickname because he "was a great stickler for his rights and talked to himself when not talking to the Umpire." Another player of the era, future Baseball Hall of Fame inductee Orator Jim O'Rourke, shared the same nickname.

== Major league regular ==
Shafer joined the National League's Louisville Grays in 1877. He earned a job as the team's starting right fielder, and he led the league in games played (61), outfield assists (21), and outfield errors (28). He also batted .285 and had the second-most home runs in the league with three. (Lip Pike had four homers.) In 1878, Shafer had one of his best seasons at the plate for the Indianapolis Blues. He batted .338 to finish sixth in the batting race and also ranked among the league leaders in on-base percentage (third), slugging percentage (third), and total bases (fourth). His OPS+ total of 186 led the league, and his 3.8 wins above replacement was the highest among all position players. Shafer also had 28 assists in the outfield.

In 1879, Shafer signed with Cap Anson's Chicago White Stockings. However, he had left Indianapolis the previous year with some unpaid debts. The White Stockings traveled to Indianapolis to play an exhibition game in June, and the local sheriff was waiting for both him and teammate Silver Flint. After the game, Shafer and Flint escaped the ballpark in a horse-drawn carriage to avoid arrest, and only their manager, Anson, was taken to jail.

Shafer batted .304 for Chicago in 1879 and also set a career high by getting 50 assists. The 50 outfield assists was 20 more than any other NL player and established a major league record that has never been broken.

In 1880, Shafer joined the Cleveland Blues and was their regular right fielder for the next three seasons. He continued his good hitting and fielding during his first year with the club, batting .266 with an OPS+ of 125 and leading the league again with 35 assists. However, his batting average dropped to .257 the following season and then to .214 in 1882. His fielding percentage dropped as well, from .901 in 1880 (fourth in the league) to .805 in 1882.

Shafer played for the Buffalo Bisons in 1883. He batted .292 and led the NL in outfield assists for the fourth and final time, with 41. He then signed with the St. Louis Maroons in the new Union Association for the 1884 season. Playing in a career-high 106 games in 1884, Shafer also batted a career-high .360 and was one of the best hitters in the UA. He led the league with 40 doubles, and he finished second only to teammate Fred Dunlap in several other offensive categories, including batting average, on-base percentage (.398), slugging percentage (.501), runs scored (130), hits (168), and total bases (234). The Maroons went 94–19 and finished first in the Union Association.

== Later career ==
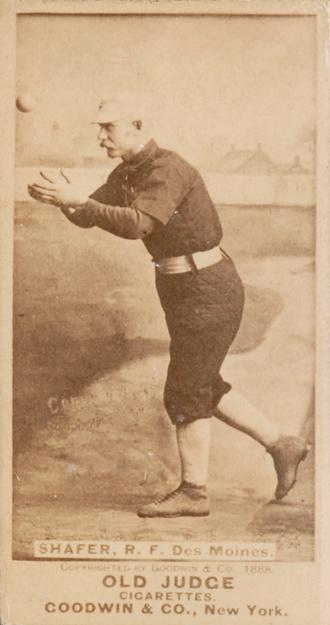
Shafer in 1888

Shafer stayed with St. Louis as they moved to the National League in 1885; his batting average fell to .195. The following season, he played 21 games for the American Association's Philadelphia Athletics, hit .268, and then spent the next few years in the minor leagues. In 1887, he played for Lincoln of the Western League until he was suspended in September for punching an umpire in the face. Shafer moved on to the Western Association's Des Moines team in 1888, and he played well, batting .338 and leading the league in hits. In 1889, he was the captain of the Detroit Wolverines, which won the International League championship.

Shafer then rejoined the Philadelphia Athletics in 1890. In his final major league season, he played in 100 games, batted .282, and led the AA's outfielders with a .958 fielding percentage. He was the second-oldest player in the league, at 38 years old. Shafer's younger brother, Taylor, also played for the 1890 Athletics.

== Legacy ==
Over his 13-season Major League Baseball career, Shafer played a total of 871 games. He had 1,000 hits in 3,552 at bats, a .282 batting average, 11 home runs, 601 runs scored, and 317 runs batted in. He also had 290 career outfield assists, which is the 10th highest total in MLB history.

Shafer was an outstanding fielder. Fellow major league right fielder Paul Radford, when writing about how to play the position, said: "I always considered 'Orator' Shaffer a splendid right fielder, because of his skill in throwing out men at the initial bag. I know he threw me out thus in two successive games at Buffalo." According to The Sporting Life, Shafer "was for years considered the best man in his position." In 2001, statistician Bill James ranked Shafer as the 99th greatest right fielder of all time.

After his baseball career ended, Shafer worked at a race track as a book-writer. He died in Philadelphia in 1922 and was buried in West Laurel Hill Cemetery in Bala Cynwyd, Pennsylvania.

== See also ==
- List of Major League Baseball annual doubles leaders
