= Paul Hines =

American baseball player (1855–1935)

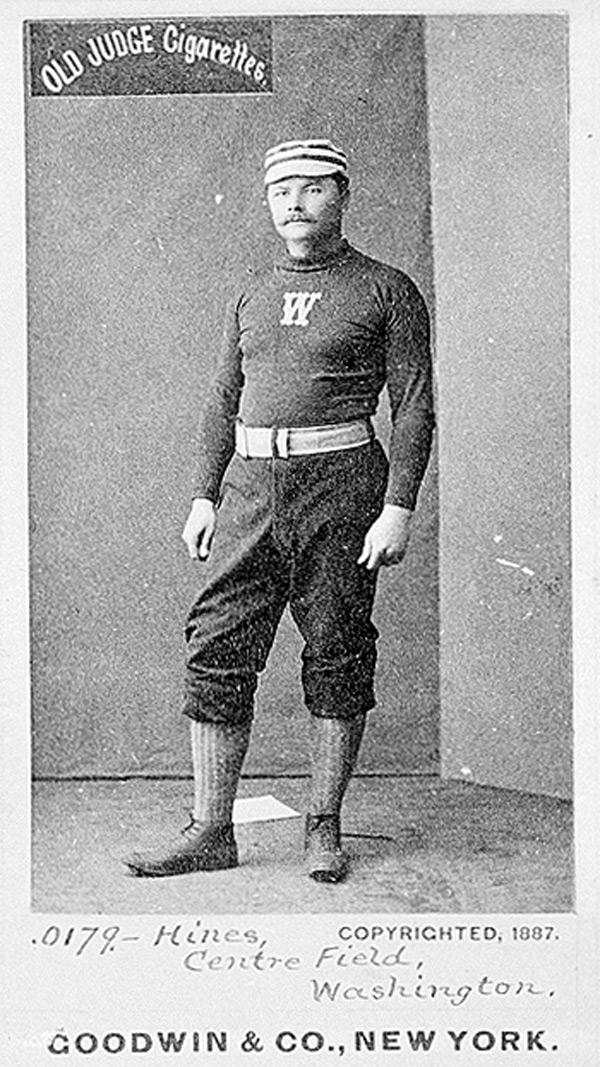
- Outfielder
- Born: March 1, 1855; Virginia, U.S.
- Died: July 10, 1935 (aged 80); Hyattsville, Maryland, U.S.
- Batted: Right Threw: Right

Major league debut
- April 20, 1872, for the Washington Nationals

Last major league appearance
- September 21, 1891, for the Washington Statesmen

Major league statistics
- Batting average: .302
- Hits: 2,133
- Home runs: 57
- Runs batted in: 855
- Stats at Baseball Reference

Teams
- Washington Nationals (1872); Washington Blue Legs (1873); Chicago White Stockings (1874–1877); Providence Grays (1878–1885); Washington Nationals (1886–1887); Indianapolis Hoosiers (1888–1889); Pittsburgh Alleghenys (1890); Boston Beaneaters (1890); Washington Statesmen (1891)

Career highlights and awards
- World Series champion (1884); NL Triple Crown (1878); 2× NL batting champion (1878, 1879); NL home run leader (1878); NL RBI leader (1878)

Paul Aloysius Hines (March 1, 1855 – July 10, 1935) was an American center fielder in professional baseball player who played in the major leagues from 1872 to 1891. Born in Virginia, he is credited with winning baseball's first batting triple crown in 1878 (Tommy Bond had accomplished the pitching version the year before); the accomplishment was not noted at the time, as runs batted in would not be counted until years later, home runs were rare and home run leadership obscure, and Abner Dalrymple was then erroneously recognized as the batting champion. Hines was the first of only three players to achieve the batting Triple Crown in the 19th century.

Hines likely practiced with the original Washington Nationals or played on its junior team before joining the National Association with that club in 1872. When the original Chicago White Stockings resumed play in 1874, the teenage Hines played every game, usually in center field. He remained with the club four seasons, including the inaugural National League championship season of 1876, and then played eight seasons for the Providence Grays from 1878 to 1885, spanning that club's entire major league association, during which the club won two pennants.

== Professional career ==
Hines started his professional career with the National Association Washington Nationals at the age of seventeen in 1872. In eleven games, he batted .224 with eleven hits. The following year, he played one last year with Washington (with the Blue Legs) and batted .331 in 39 games.

He then moved over to the Chicago White Stockings in 1874. He batted .295 in 59 games with eighty hits. He also stole four bases (the first recorded ones of his career). The following year, he batted .328 in 68 games with 101 hits. He essentially repeated himself the following year, batting .331 with 101 hits in 64 games; he led the new National League in doubles with 21. The White Stockings were the first champions of the NL that year, going 52–14 that year. In his last year with Chicago in 1877, he batted .280 in sixty games with 73 hits.

He moved to the Providence Grays in 1878 and remained there for the next seven years. He thrived in his first season with the team in 62 games played, leading the league in batting average (.358), home runs (four), runs batted in (fifty), OPS (.849), and total bases (125). As the category of runs batted in (RBI) was not generally recognized at the time, Hines was only given credit as the first "Triple Crown" winner years later. On May 8, 1878, he took part in what is believed to have been an unassisted triple play. Playing at home in the Messer Street Grounds against Boston, runners Jack Manning and Ezra Sutton were on third and second base, respectively; Jack Burdock was up to bat with no outs. Burdock hit a short fly to left field that Hines ran hard to catch for an out, and he ran all the way to third base to get Manning out. What is in dispute is whether Sutton had in fact rounded third base. The rules of the time stated that if both players had passed third base, runners would be out if the fielder had caught a fly ball and then stepped on third base. However, second baseman Charles Sweasy was quoted as stating that he had assisted Hines when Sutton had apparently reached third base and tried to run back to second base, as Hines threw the ball to Sweasy at second base. First baseman Tim Murnane had stated that it was all done by Hines, even stating so when he became a sportswriter for the Boston Globe. For his part, Sutton described himself as having been twenty feet away from third base when the ball was caught. The play remains a subject for researchers to discuss, with even official MLB historian John Thorn believing that the play was indeed unassisted (although the official MLB website does not recognize it). The scoresheet for the game does not survive as well.

The next year, he led the league in numerous categories again, doing so with 85 games played, hits (146), and batting average (.357); he also led the league in total bases (197), plate appearances, and at-bats. Hines was the first player to collect six hits in an extra-inning game. On August 26, 1879, he went 6-for-6 in a game against the Troy Trojans. While a handful of players would match the hits total over the years, only four have surpassed it (Johnny Burnett did so first in 1932 with nine). In 1880, he batted .307 with 115 hits while leading in plate appearances (387) within 85 games. The next year saw him play eighty games and bat just .285 but led the league in doubles with 27 while having 103 hits. The next year, he batted .309 with 117 hits in 84 games. He batted .299, .302, and .270 in his last three seasons with the Grays, which included at least 110 hits in each one while leading the league in doubles in 1884 with 36. He made his only postseason appearance in the pre-modern World Series in 1884. He batted .250 (2-for-8) with three walks, an RBI, and two stolen bases as the Grays won the title. The Providence club folded in 1885.

Hines moved over to the Washington Nationals of the National League in 1886, and he batted .312 that year while stealing 21 bases (his first since 1875 according to recorded statistics) with 152 hits (a career high) in 121 games. He played in 123 games in 1887 and batted .308 and walked 48 times (the second time in his career he walked 40+ in a season) while recording a career high 72 RBIs with 147 hits. He then moved to the Indianapolis Hoosiers in 1888, where he played two seasons. He collected over 140 hits in each season, which included a career high 133 games played in 1888 along with his final .300 season in 1889 (.305). He played for both Pittsburgh Alleghenys and Boston Beaneaters in 1890 and batted just .239 in 100 games while driving in 57 runs with 94 hits, which helped push him to over 2,000 career hits. He closed his career where it had started in Washington (with the American Association team in the Washington Statesmen) in 1891. He batted .282 with 58 hits.

He continued to play baseball in minor leagues. He finished his professional career splitting 1896 between the minor league teams Burlington, Iowa and Mobile, Alabama, at the age of 41.

== Legacy ==
1887 Buchner Gold Coin (N284) card of Hines for Washington

Hines played in the outfield (primarily center field) in his career, playing 1,376 of his 1,682 total games there; he also played/started a game at first base (194), second base (74), third base (eighteen), shortstop (sixteen), catcher (three), and even pitcher (one inning). Hines had a .884 fielding percentage as an outfielder and a total fielding percentage of .903. Hines was a two-time batting champion (1878–79) while finishing in the top ten of the NA once (1875) and the NL four times (1876, 1880, 1882, 1886). He batted .300 in eleven of his twenty seasons played. He finished in the top ten among hits leaders in ten seasons.

During the first five NL seasons, from 1876 through 1880, Hines had more base hits than any other player, and he retired third to Cap Anson and Jim O'Rourke with 1,884 career hits in the majors. He also remained among the top ten major league career home run hitters as late as 1887. His total of sixteen seasons as a major league team's primary center fielder was not surpassed until Tris Speaker and Ty Cobb in 1925.

In 1,658 games over twenty seasons, Hines posted a .302 batting average (2,133-for-7,062) with 1217 runs, 399 doubles, 93 triples, 57 home runs, 855 RBI, 372 bases on balls, .340 on-base percentage and .409 slugging percentage.

Hines was a favorite player of William McKinley while the latter was a United States representative from Ohio.

== Personal life ==
After his playing career ended, William McKinley helped him secure a government job.

He was arrested in 1922, at the age of 65, on charges of pickpocketing.

Hines died at age 80 in Hyattsville, Maryland, deaf and blind. His hearing had been impaired since 1886 after being hit in the head by a pitch.

== See also ==
- List of Major League Baseball batting champions
- List of Major League Baseball annual home run leaders
- List of Major League Baseball annual runs batted in leaders
- List of Major League Baseball annual doubles leaders
- List of Major League Baseball career hits leaders
- List of Major League Baseball career runs scored leaders
- List of Major League Baseball single-game hits leaders
