= Tom Healey =

American baseball player (1853–1891)

- Pitcher
- Born: 1853; Cranston, Rhode Island, U.S.
- Died: February 6, 1891 (aged 37–38); Lewiston, Maine, U.S.
- Batted: Unknown Threw: Right

MLB debut
- June 13, 1878, for the Providence Grays

Last MLB appearance
- September 9, 1878, for the Indianapolis Blues

MLB statistics
- Win–loss record: 6–7
- Earned run average: 2.39
- Strikeouts: 20
- Stats at Baseball Reference

Teams
- Providence Grays (1878); Indianapolis Blues (1878)

Thomas F. Healey (1853 – February 6, 1891) was an American Major League Baseball player who pitched for one season. In (1878) he played with the Providence Grays and Indianapolis Blues. For his career, he compiled a 6-7 record in 14 appearances, with a 2.39 earned run average and 20 strikeouts. He was born in Cranston, Rhode Island and died in Lewiston, Maine.

== See also ==
- List of Major League Baseball annual saves leaders
