= Candy Nelson =

American baseball player (1849–1910)

- Shortstop
- Born: March 14, 1849; Portland, Maine, U.S.
- Died: September 4, 1910 (aged 61); Brooklyn, New York, U.S.
- Batted: Left Threw: Right

Major-league debut
- June 11, 1872, for the Troy Haymakers

Last major-league appearance
- August 25, 1890, for the Brooklyn Gladiators

Major-league statistics
- Batting average: .253
- Home runs: 3
- Runs batted in: 208
- Stats at Baseball Reference

Teams
- National Association of Base Ball Players Brooklyn Eckfords (1867–1869) New York Mutuals (1870) League player Troy Haymakers (1872) Brooklyn Eckfords (1872) New York Mutuals (1873–1875) Indianapolis Blues (1878) Troy Trojans (1879) Worcester Ruby Legs (1881) New York Metropolitans (1883–1887) New York Giants (1887) Brooklyn Gladiators (1890)

Career highlights and awards
- Led NA in walks (1874); Led AA in walks twice (1884, 1885)

John W. "Candy" Nelson (March 14, 1849 – September 4, 1910) was an American professional baseball shortstop. He played 13 seasons between 1872 and 1890 for nine teams in three leagues.

== Biography ==
A native of Maine, Nelson entered professional baseball in Brooklyn in 1867. He made his major-league debut in the National Association with the Troy Haymakers in 1872.

In 1890, he was the oldest player in the American Association at age 41. A couple of years later, major publications described him as owning a milk route in Brooklyn. On the 1900 U.S. Census, Nelson listed "ball player" for his occupation. He died of heart problems at home in Brooklyn in 1910.

== Sources ==
- Career statistics from Baseball Reference · Baseball Reference (Minors) · Retrosheet · Baseball Almanac
