= Silver Flint =

American baseball player (1855–1892)

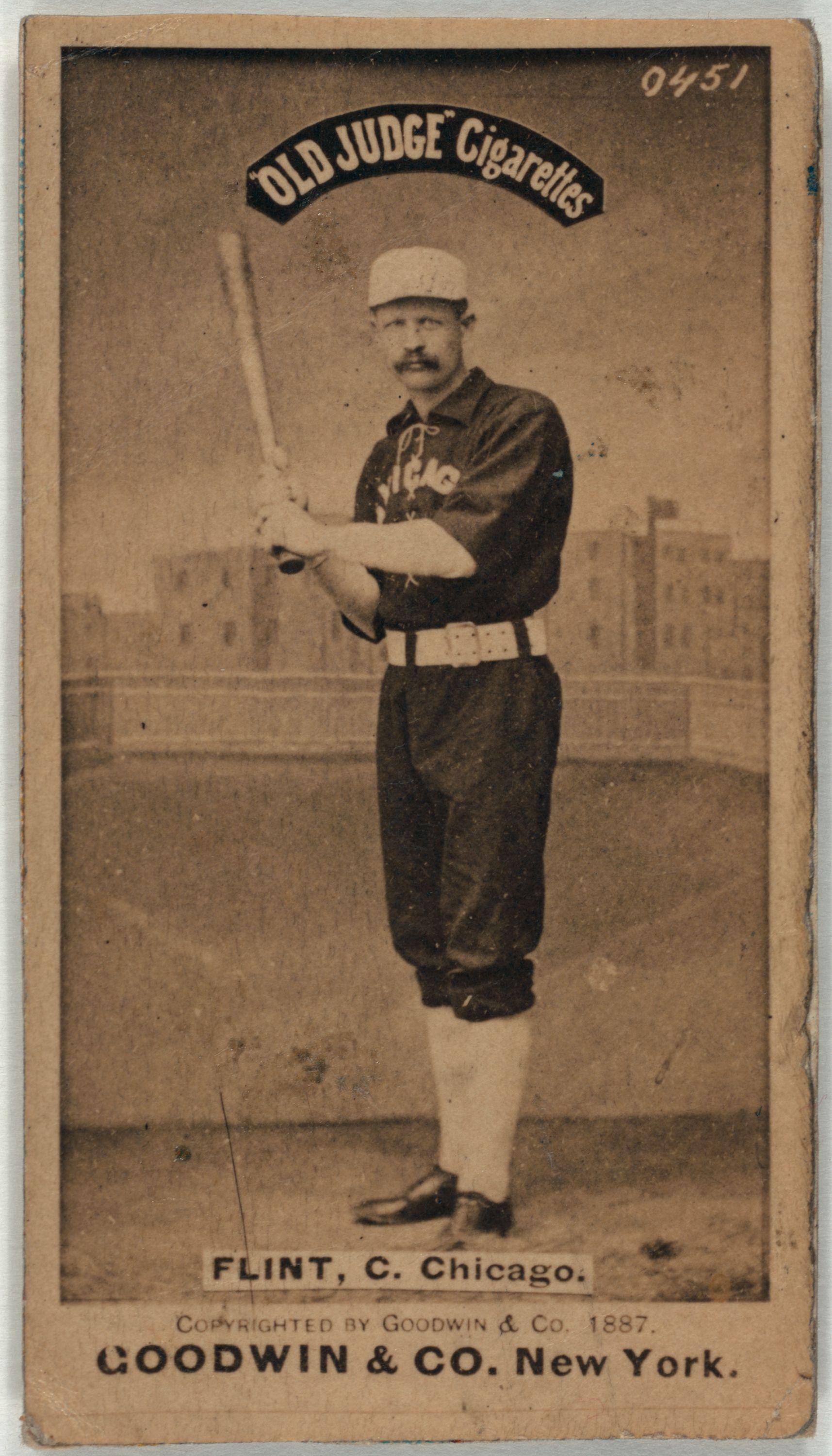
- Silver Flint baseball card
- Catcher
- Born: August 3, 1855; Philadelphia, Pennsylvania, U.S.
- Died: January 14, 1892 (aged 36); Chicago, Illinois, U.S.
- Batted: Right Threw: Right

MLB debut
- May 4, 1875, for the St. Louis Red Stockings

Last MLB appearance
- July 18, 1889, for the Chicago White Stockings

MLB statistics
- Batting average: .236
- Home runs: 21
- Runs batted in: 295
- Stats at Baseball Reference

Teams
- St. Louis Red Stockings (1875); Indianapolis Blues (1878); Chicago White Stockings (1879–1889)

Frank Sylvester "Silver" Flint (August 3, 1855 – January 14, 1892) was an American catcher in Major League Baseball. He played 13 seasons of major league baseball for the St. Louis Red Stockings, Indianapolis Blues and Chicago White Stockings.

For about two decades, Flint was the only major league player to have caught three no-hitters. He was known as a hard-nosed player, catching with his bare hands and playing through frequent broken bones in his hands.

== Early life and early career ==
Flint was born in Philadelphia and lived in St. Louis as a child. He received the nickname "Silver" because he had light blonde hair. Flint played for a local amateur baseball team, the St. Louis Elephants, in 1874.

Flint began his professional career at age 19 with the 1875 St. Louis Red Stockings. The team participated in the National Association for 19 games before leaving the league, having won only four of its games. Flint played in 17 of the team's 19 games, but he got only 5 hits in 61 at bats for a .082 batting average.

Rather than staying with the Red Stockings to play against semipro and amateur teams, he went to Covington, Kentucky, to play for the independent professional Star Baseball Club. The Covington team clashed with the leadership of the Cincinnati Reds, who were preparing for play in the new National League, and the Covington Stars folded in the summer of 1876.

In 1877, Flint played for the Indianapolis Blues of the League Alliance, and he stayed with the team when it was brought into the National League in 1878. Flint started playing in the days before modern innovations to protect the hands and bodies of catchers. He developed a spring ritual in which he placed his hands in buckets of sand and allowed teammates to hit his hands with bats, thinking that this would make his hands more limber.

== Chicago White Stockings ==
After the 1878 season, Cap Anson signed Flint and his Indianapolis teammate Orator Shafer to the Chicago White Stockings of the National League. In his first season with the White Stockings, Flint and Anson split duties managing the team, which finished 5–12 under Flint and 41–21 under Anson. That was Flint's only opportunity as manager. Flint remained with Chicago for the rest of his playing career, spending eleven seasons almost exclusively as a catcher.

Flint and Shafer had incurred significant debts during their time with Indianapolis, and when the White Stockings traveled back to that city in June 1879, the sheriff was waiting on them. Anson shielded the two players from authorities. The players escaped in a horse-drawn carriage, while Anson was arrested for interfering with their arrest and had to pay a fine.

With Chicago, Flint played alongside pitching ace Larry Corcoran for several seasons. The pair developed what is thought to be the first system of signals between a pitcher and catcher. Corcoran chewed tobacco, and he shifted the tobacco to one side of his mouth or the other, depending on whether he was throwing a fastball or curveball. During the ninth inning of a no-hitter thrown by Corcoran on August 19, 1880, Flint dislocated his right thumb. The Chicago Tribune noted that as a result of an attempt to put the thumb back in place, "the flesh was badly lacerated. It will probably disable Flint altogether for a fortnight at least." On August 20, 1882, amid a run of 16 Chicago wins in 18 games, Flint caught another no-hitter by Corcoran.

Flint's financial difficulties continued as his career progressed, worsened by fines he incurred for his drinking and rowdy behavior. His Chicago teammate Billy Sunday said he thought Flint's alcohol use was an attempt to deal with the pain he endured while playing catcher with his bare hands. In 1883, a man in Florida wrote to National League president Albert Spalding and told him that Flint and pitcher Ned Williamson refused to pay him back for a loan. Spalding threatened to kick the two players out of the league, but they paid their debt and the story was kept out of newspapers.

In 1885, Flint was still the primary catcher for the White Stockings, but he did not appear in as many games as the team's star pitcher, future Hall of Famer John Clarkson. (Clarkson made 70 starts and won a league-leading 53 games, while Flint appeared in 68 games.) On July 27 of that year, Flint caught a third no-hitter, thrown by Clarkson.

Both the 1885 and 1886 White Stockings won the National League, and in both years they faced the champions of the American Association, the St. Louis Browns, in a pre-modern World Series. The 1885 World Series ended in a controversial tie, and the White Stockings lost the 1886 World Series. In 17 at bats between the two World Series, Flint had two hits.

For twenty years, Flint was the only major league player to have caught three no-hitters. Ed McFarland tied the feat in 1905, and now several players have caught three or four career no-hit games.

== Personal life ==
Flint married Eva de la Motta, the ex-wife of minstrel show performer Lew Benedict, in 1879.

== Later life ==
After his baseball career ended in 1889, Flint briefly owned a saloon in Chicago at 35th Street and Fifth Avenue. By December 1890, Flint was said to have fallen on hard times. His wife had filed for divorce, most of his property was taken when a billiard company foreclosed on a chattel mortgage, and police had just closed his saloon after he lost a judgment to the Peter Schoenhofen Brewing Company.

In November 1891, Flint was reported to be dying of consumption. He died of the disease in Chicago about two months later. He died at the home of his ex-wife, who had cared for him in his last weeks. Former teammates, including Cap Anson, attended his funeral, and Billy Sunday performed the service. Flint was one of four players from the 1880s White Stockings to die before age 40. (Note: King Kelly and Ned Williamson both died at 36. Larry Corcoran died at 32.)

== See also ==
- List of Major League Baseball player–managers
