= Fred Warner (baseball) =

American baseball player (1855–1886)

- Third baseman
- Born: January 7, 1855; Philadelphia, Pennsylvania, US
- Died: February 13, 1886 (aged 31); Philadelphia, Pennsylvania, US
- Batted: Unknown Threw: Unknown

MLB debut
- April 21, 1875, for the Philadelphia Centennials

Last MLB appearance
- September 11, 1884, for the Brooklyn Atlantics

MLB statistics
- Batting average: .234
- Home runs: 1
- Runs batted in: 47
- Stats at Baseball Reference

Teams
- Philadelphia Centennials (1875); Philadelphia Athletics (1876); Indianapolis Blues (1878); Cleveland Blues (1879); Philadelphia Quakers (1883); Brooklyn Atlantics (1884)

Frederick John Rodney Warner (January 7, 1855 – February 13, 1886) was an American professional baseball third baseman.

== Biography ==
Warner played in Major League Baseball (MLB) from 1875 through 1884 for the Philadelphia Centennials, Philadelphia Athletics, Indianapolis Blues, Cleveland Blues, Philadelphia Quakers, and Brooklyn Atlantics.

Warner died at the age of 31 in his hometown of Philadelphia, Pennsylvania, and was interred at The Woodlands Cemetery.
