= Russ McKelvy =

American baseball player (1854–1915)

- Center fielder
- Born: September 8, 1854; Swissvale, Pennsylvania, U.S.
- Died: October 19, 1915 (aged 61); Omaha, Nebraska, U.S.
- Batted: Right Threw: Right

MLB debut
- May 1, 1878, for the Indianapolis Blues

Last MLB appearance
- August 24, 1882, for the Pittsburgh Alleghenys

MLB statistics
- Batting average: .222
- Runs scored: 33
- Runs batted in: 36
- Stats at Baseball Reference

Teams
- Indianapolis Blues (1878); Pittsburgh Alleghenys (1882)

Career highlights and awards
- Led NL in games played with 63 in 1878; Led NL center fielders in games played with 62 in 1878

Russell Errett McKelvy (September 8, 1854 – October 19, 1915) was an American Major League Baseball player who played center field for the 1878 Indianapolis Blues of the National League (the only year the Blues were in the Major Leagues), and one game in right field for the 1882 Pittsburgh Alleghenys.

== Career ==
After attending Allegheny College from 1873 through 1877, McKelvy signed with the Indianapolis Blues of the National league for the 1878 season. He became the first player from Allegheny College to make it to the Major League level, as well the first to hit a home run.

It came against Bobby Mitchell on June 1, 1878, in the top of the third inning, when he hit a two-run, inside-the-park home run. It was the only home run Mitchell surrendered during his four-year career.

McKelvy played in a league leading 63 games that season, 62 of them in center field, which also led all National league center fielders in games played. His two home runs were third, and his 36 runs batted in were seventh amongst the league leaders. He pitched in a total of four games as a pitcher, one of which was a start, and the other three came in relief.

1878 was the only year that the Blues were at the Major League level, and McKelvy did not reappear in the Majors until he made a one-game return, for the 1882 Pittsburgh Alleganys. In that game, played on August 24, 1882, he played right field, batted four times, and did not have a hit. This was his last appearance in the Majors.

== Post-career ==
McKelvy died at the age of 61 in Omaha, Nebraska, and is interred at Forest Lawn Memorial Park in Omaha.
