= Joe Quest =

American baseball player (1852–1924)

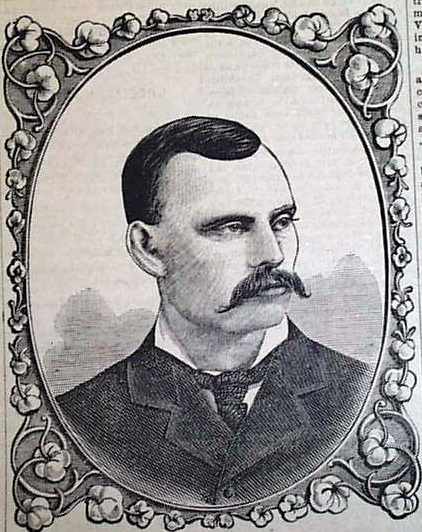
- Quest, c. 1886
- Second baseman
- Born: November 16, 1852; New Castle, Pennsylvania, U.S.
- Died: November 14, 1924 (aged 71); San Diego, California, U.S.
- Batted: Right Threw: Right

MLB debut
- August 30, 1871, for the Cleveland Forest Citys

Last MLB appearance
- July 13, 1886, for the Philadelphia Athletics

MLB statistics
- Batting average: .217
- Home runs: 1
- Runs batted in: 161
- Stats at Baseball Reference

Teams
- Cleveland Forest Citys (1871); Indianapolis Blues (1878); Chicago White Stockings (1878–1882); Detroit Wolverines (1883); St. Louis Browns (1883–1884); Pittsburgh Alleghenys (1884); Detroit Wolverines (1885); Philadelphia Athletics (1886)

Joseph L. Quest (November 16, 1852 – November 14, 1924) was an American professional baseball player from 1871 to 1892. He played 10 seasons in Major League Baseball (principally as a second baseman) for seven different major league clubs. His longest time with one team was with the Chicago White Stockings from 1879 to 1882, a stretch that included National League pennants in 1880, 1881, and 1882. He also appeared in parts of the 1883 and 1884 seasons with the St. Louis Browns and with the Detroit Wolverines in 1883 and 1885.

Although accounts vary as to the phrase's origin, Quest is perhaps most remembered for reportedly coining the phrase "Charley horse" to describe a sudden leg cramp or sprain. Quest appeared in 596 major league games and compiled a .217 batting average with 499 hits and 161 runs batted in. In 1878, he led the National League in errors at all positions, though he also led the league's second basemen in fielding percentage in both 1879 and 1881. He also led all position players with 331 assists in 1879.

== Early years ==
Quest was born in 1852 in New Castle, Pennsylvania. His father, Jacob Quest, was a machinist in New Castle with a shop known as Quest & Shaw. Quest was an apprentice at his father's machine shop as a young man.

== Professional baseball career ==
=== Cleveland Forest Citys ===
Quest began his major league career in 1871 at age 18 with the Cleveland Forest Citys of the National Association of Professional Baseball Players. He appeared in only three games for Cleveland, two at second base and one at shortstop, and compiled a .231 batting average.

=== Indianapolis ===
After the 1871 season, Quest did not return to the major leagues for another seven years. Though minor league records from the 1870s are incomplete, there is some record of Quest having played for the Indianapolis Blues of the League Alliance in 1877.

In 1878, the Indianapolis Blues attained major league status with admission to the National League. Quest was the team's regular second baseman in 1878, compiled a .205 batting average, and led the National League with 290 plate appearances and 221 outs made. He was also among the league leaders with 12 bases on balls (6th) and 45 runs scored (9th). Defensively, Quest led the league with 62 games played at second base, but also led all position players with 60 errors. Despite leading the league in errors, he appears to have had above average range, ranking among the league's leading second basemen with 228 putouts (2nd), 27 double plays (2nd), 196 assists (3rd), a 6.84 range factor (3rd), and an .876 fielding percentage (3rd).

=== Chicago ===
Quest joined Cap Anson's Chicago White Stockings for the 1879 season. He became the team's regular second baseman, appearing in 83 games at the position in 1879. Quest continued to under-perform offensively with a .207 batting average. His principal value remained in his defensive contributions. During the 1879 season, Quest led all position players in the National League with 331 assists and his Defensive Wins Above Replacement (Defensive WAR) rating of 1.4 was the sixth highest among all position players. He also led the league's second basemen with a .925 fielding percentage and ranked third with 263 putouts and 30 double plays. His range factor of 7.16 was a career high.

Quest remained in Chicago as the starting second baseman for the 1880 Chicago White Stockings team that compiled a 67–17 record (.798) and won the National League pennant by 15 games. Quest boosted his batting average to .237 in 1880 and contributed a career high 27 RBIs. Defensively, he continued to show his value with a 1.0 Defensive WAR that was 10th highest among all players in the National League. His 278 assists ranked fifth among all position players, though he also ranked fourth in the league with 68 errors.

Quest was again the starting second baseman for the 1881 White Stockings. The team won its second consecutive National League pennant with a 56–28 record. Quest compiled a .246 batting average with 26 RBIs and continued to rank as one of the best defensive players in the National League, as his .929 fielding percentage led the league's second basemen, and his Defensive WAR rating of 0.9 was ninth highest among all position players. In his autobiography, Cap Anson praised Quest's contributions to the White Stockings:

"Joe was a good, reliable, steady fellow, but a weak batsman. He was a conscientious player, however, and one that could always be depended upon to play the best ball that he was capable of. His strongest point was trapping an infield fly, and in this particular line he was something of a wonder."

During the 1882 season, Quest shared second base with Tom Burns, with Burns appearing in 43 games at the position and Quest in 41. Between them, they helped lead the White Stockings to their third consecutive National League pennant with a 55–29 record.

=== 1883–1886 ===
In December 1882, the White Stockings sold Quest to the Detroit Wolverines. Over the next four seasons, Quest played for four different teams, compiling a batting average of .212 with 35 doubles, 11 triples, and 56 RBIs. He played for the Detroit Wolverines for the first part of the 1883 season, the St. Louis Browns for the last part of the 1883 season and first part of the 1884 season, the Pittsburgh Alleghenys in the last part of the 1884 season, the Detroit Wolverines in 1885, and the Philadelphia Athletics in 1886. He appeared in his last major league game as a member of the Athletics on July 13, 1886.

=== Minor leagues ===
Although his major league career ended in 1886, Quest continued to play in the minor leagues through the 1892 season. His late minor league career included stints with Eau Claire, Wisconsin, in the Northwestern League (player-manager, 1887), Lowell, Massachusetts, in the New England League (1888), Toledo, Ohio, in the International League (1889), and the Ishpeming-Nagaunee Unions in the Wisconsin–Michigan League (player-manager, 1892). He also worked as an umpire in the Illinois–Iowa League in 1891, and in the Texas League in 1895.

== Later years ==
Quest purchased land in Los Angeles in 1887. By 1920, Quest was living at 743 West Hawthorne in San Diego, California, with his sons, Joseph and Robert, and daughter, Helen Ethel. Quest died in 1924 at age 71 in San Diego. He was buried at Mt. Hope Cemetery there.

== "Charley horse" ==
Quest has been credited in several accounts with coining the phrase "Charley horse" to describe a sudden leg cramp or sprain. In The New Bill James Historical Baseball Abstract, baseball historian Bill James relies on an origin story set forth in multiple accounts published in 1906, and attributed to former outfielder Hugh Nicol. According to that version, Quest and several other members of the White Stockings spent an off day at a horse race on the south side of Chicago. The players had received a tip that a horse named "Charley" was a "sure thing" in one of the races. All of the players, except Quest, placed bets on Charley. The horse took an early lead in the race but pulled up lame around the final turn. Quest, who had been teased for not betting on the horse, reportedly yelled to the other players, "Look at your Charley horse now." The next day, while running to second base, Chicago outfielder George Gore pulled up with a strain, much as the horse had done. The incident is reported to have prompted Quest to proclaim, "There's your old Charley horse." From that time, the players began using the term to refer to a sudden leg cramp or strain.

The earliest known account of the phrase's origin in reference to a sports injury was published in the Boston Globe in 1886. The Boston Globe also attributed the phrase to Quest. According to that account, Quest "gave the name of 'Charlie horse' to a peculiar contraction and hardening of the muscles and tendons of the thigh, to which base ball players are especially liable from the sudden starting and stopping in chasing balls, as well as the frequent slides in base running."

According to a third account, published in 1889, Quest coined the phrase based on his experience working in his father's machine shop, where an old horse named "Charley" walked stiffly after pulling heavy loads. When later observing ball players walk with a similar stiffness after a cramp or strain, Quest was reported to have referred to the condition as a "Charley horse". A similar account was later published in The Sporting Life in 1898.

A fourth account, published in 1937, stated that Quest developed the phrase after limping off the field and commenting, "I'm as lame as that old white horse Charley over there in the lot." According to that account, team-mates began calling Quest "Charley horse" and used the term to refer to painful body stiffness from over-strained muscles.

Other accounts have cited origin stories unrelated to Quest, though it has been noted that such accounts "can be discounted because the term was in use before the protagonist came to be." One such version attributed the phrase to Charlie Esper, a pitcher who reportedly walked "like a lame horse." However, Esper did not begin playing until 1894, by which time the phrase was already well established.
