= South Street Park =

Baseball grounds in Indianapolis, Indiana, US

- Interactive map of South Street Park
- Location: Indianapolis, Indiana
- Coordinates: 39°45′44″N 86°09′14″W
- Surface: Grass

Tenant
- Indianapolis Blues (NL) (1878)

South Street Park or South Street Grounds is a former baseball ground located in Indianapolis, Indiana, U.S. The ground was home to the Indianapolis Blues of the National League for the 1878 season and was also known then as National Park. The ground first hosted baseball for the city's International Association entry during 1876–1877. It was also a neutral site for some Chicago White Stockings games during 1878. City directories during 1876 through 1879 call the property Indianapolis Base Ball Park.

In some winter seasons, the field was flooded to allow for skating. This was not an unusual practice with athletic fields at the time.

The ballfield was located on a block bounded by Delaware Street (west), South Street (south), and Alabama Street (east). The site was later occupied by Big Four freight houses. It is currently a parking lot for Gainbridge Fieldhouse, which is across the street to the west.

== See also ==
- List of baseball parks in Indianapolis
- List of former Major League Baseball stadiums
