= Ned Williamson =

American baseball player (1857–1894)

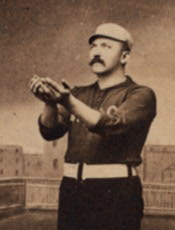
- Third baseman / shortstop
- Born: October 24, 1857; Philadelphia, Pennsylvania, US
- Died: March 3, 1894 (aged 36); Willow Springs, Arkansas, US
- Batted: Right Threw: Right

MLB debut
- May 1, 1878, for the Indianapolis Blues

Last appearance
- September 27, 1890, for the Chicago Pirates

MLB statistics
- Batting average: .255
- Home runs: 64
- Runs batted in: 667
- Stats at Baseball Reference

Teams
- Indianapolis Blues (1878); Chicago White Stockings (1879–1889); Chicago Pirates (1890)

Career highlights and awards
- NL home run leader (1884)

Edward Nagle Williamson (October 24, 1857 – March 3, 1894) was an American professional baseball infielder in Major League Baseball. He played for three teams: the Indianapolis Blues of the National League (NL) for one season, the Chicago White Stockings (NL) for 11 seasons, and the Chicago Pirates of the Players' League for one season.

From 1883 and 1887, Williamson held the single-season record for both doubles and home runs. Although his record for doubles was surpassed in 1887, he held the home run record until 1919, when it was topped by Babe Ruth of the Boston Red Sox. Statistically, he was one of the best fielders of his era. During the first eight years of his career, he led the league at his position in both fielding percentage and double plays five times, and he also led his position in assists six times. Later, when he moved to shortstop, he again led the league in both assists and double plays.

His career was shortened by a knee injury that he suffered in Paris during a world-tour organized by Albert Spalding. After he left organized baseball, his health declined rapidly. He contracted tuberculosis and ultimately died at the age of 36 of dropsy.

== Career ==
Born in Philadelphia, Williamson began his major league career on May 1, 1878 for the Indianapolis Blues of the National League. That season he played in all 63 of the team's games as the starting third baseman, leading the league in that category. He umpired his only game on August 12, calling a game between the Chicago White Stockings and the Providence Grays. His season-ending statistics included a .232 batting average, one home run, and 31 runs scored.

The Blues were only a major league team for the 1878 season, resulting in Williamson joining the Chicago White Stockings for the 1879 season. He was their regular third baseman, leading the league in multiple fielding categories for his position, including fielding percentage, assists, putouts, and double plays. As a hitter, his numbers improved. He finished second in the league with 13 triples, and eighth in doubles with 20, while also raising his batting average to .294. During the next three seasons, his batting statistics fluctuated from year to year. His batting average rose from .251 in 1880 to .282 in 1882; likewise, his 20 doubles in 1880 were good for seventh in the league, but dropped to 12 in 1881. He followed that season with 27 in 1882, which was fourth in the league. During this time period, when his level of hitting had dropped, his play in the field did not. He led the league in fielding percentage from 1880 to 1882, and in assists in 1881 and 1882.

In 1883, Williamson set the major league record for doubles in a single season by hitting 49, surpassing King Kelly's 37 set the previous year. Williamson's record for doubles stood until Tip O'Neill of the St. Louis Browns hit 52 in 1887. Williamson's doubles achievement was attributed to the short dimensions of Chicago's Lakeshore Park; the distances were 186 feet (57 m) in left field, 300 feet (91 m) in center field, and 190 feet (58 m) in right field. Balls that were hit over the fence were counted as doubles until 1884, when they became home runs. On September 6, Chicago scored a record 18 runs in one inning during a 26–6 victory over the Detroit Wolverines. Williamson contributed three hits, and scored three runs in that inning, setting individual records in both categories. Other than runs scored, the other team records set that day included the most hits and total bases in one inning.

During this time period, the establishment of the ground rules of each park rested with the home team. In 1884, team captain and on-field manager Cap Anson decided that balls hit over the fence were to be home runs. Williamson used these short dimensions and new ground rules to set the single-season home run record by hitting 27 in a 112-game season, surpassing the record of 14 set by Harry Stovey the previous year. Of the 27 home runs he hit that year, 25 of them were hit at home. This record stood for 35 years until it was broken in 1919 by Babe Ruth, who hit 29 for the Boston Red Sox in a 140-game schedule. The first three of Williamson's 27 home runs came on May 30, in the second game of a doubleheader against the Detroit Wolverines. Williamson became the first major league baseball player to hit three home runs in one game. During these two record-breaking seasons, his fielding prowess did not recede. He did not lead the league in fielding percentage in either 1883 or 1884, but did lead in assists, capping off a streak of five consecutive years in which he did so, while also leading the league in double plays for the second and third consecutive years.

After the 1884 season, the White Stockings moved to West Side Park, and Williamson's power numbers dropped. Without the short fences, his home run total dropped to three, his doubles went down to 16, and his batting average dropped to .238, his lowest average since he became a White Stocking. Despite his low hitting numbers, he did lead the league in games played with 113, bases on balls with 75, and yet again, led his position in assists, double plays, and for the fifth and last time, fielding percentage. Chicago won the National League championship that season, and agreed to play the American Association champions, the St. Louis Browns in a seven-game "World Series". Before game one began, the players of both teams held a field day which included contests of skill, and Williamson won the long throw with a toss that traveled 400 feet, four inches. The 1885 series ended in a tie when each team won three games, and one game ended in a tie. Williamson collected two base hits in 23 at bats, for a .087 batting average, and scored one run.

Beginning in 1886, Williamson switched his fielding position to shortstop, while the Chicago White Stockings again won the National League championship, their fifth in seven years. The team's success did not coincide with Williamson's slide in seasonal numbers. His batting average dropped to his career low of .216, and his strikeouts jumped up to a career high of 71, in 430 at bats, although he did finish third in bases on balls. The White Stockings met the St. Louis Browns following the season and agreed to play a best of seven "World Series" for the second consecutive year. The Browns won the series, four games to two, and Williamson's statistics for the series did not improve. In fact, they were worse than in 1885. He gathered one base hit in 18 at bats, for a .056 batting average, and scored two runs.

1887 was Williamson's second season at shortstop, his last full season in the majors, and his numbers began to climb back to what they were during the early part of his career. His batting average jumped back up to .267, hit 20 doubles, 14 triples, 73 base on balls, and nine home runs. In 1888, his batting average dipped again, this time to .250, but he did finish fourth in the league in both RBIs with 73, and base on balls with 65. In the field, he led the league in assists and double plays.

== Spalding's world tour ==
At the completion of the 1888 baseball season, Albert Spalding organized an around-the-world tour to promote the game of baseball. The two teams Spalding selected were the White Stockings and a collection of players from other National League teams. The tour departed on October 20, 1888 to play exhibition games throughout the western United States for a month, before departing to Hawaii. The tour visited several foreign countries, such as Australia, Egypt, Ceylon (Sri Lanka), France, Italy, and England. It was during a game played on at the Parc Aristotique in Paris, France on March 8, 1889, when Williamson suffered a torn knee cap which forced him to be bedridden in England on doctor's orders, missing the tour through Britain. Though players in the 19th century were responsible for their own medical care, Williamson asked Spalding to help him financially with the mounting medical costs. Spalding refused, citing that he was not obligated to assist, and Williamson never forgave him for this.

Williamson, among his baseball contemporaries, wrote the most colorful articles to newspapers as the tour was unfolding. Williamson, an 1880s teammate of Anson in Chicago, had a knack for roasting—poking fun at—his teammates while always coming across as good-natured. A testament to the letters' significance is that they are a dominant source of one recent book's World Tour presentation. Williamson is portrayed by Charlie Crabtree in the 2015 movie Deadball, which depicts his life and journaling of the world tour.

== Late career and death ==
The injury to Williamson's knee caused his career to suffer, as he played in 47 games during the 1889 season. He batted .237, and of his 41 hits that season, only five of them were extra base hits. He joined the Chicago Pirates of the Players' League for the 1890 season, his final major league season, and played in 73 games, hitting .195.

In the spring of 1894, Williamson traveled to Hot Springs, Arkansas, in hopes that he could recover from a liver ailment and lose some weight as well, but the treatments did not work. Williamson died on March 3 of that year, at the age of 36 in Willow Springs, Arkansas, of dropsy (edema) complicated by consumption (tuberculosis). He was interred in an unmarked grave at Rosehill Cemetery in Chicago, until November 6, 2021, when the grave received a dedication thanks to the efforts of the Society for American Baseball Research (SABR); the grave notes his single-season record of home runs set in 1884.

== See also ==
- List of Major League Baseball home run records
- List of Major League Baseball annual home run leaders
- List of Major League Baseball annual saves leaders
- List of Major League Baseball annual doubles leaders

Preceded by King Kelly	Single season doubles record holder 1883–1886	Succeeded by Tip O'Neill
Preceded by Harry Stovey	Single season home run record holder 1884–1919	Succeeded by Babe Ruth
