= 1878 in baseball =

The following are the baseball events of the year 1878 throughout the world.

== Champions ==
- National League: Boston Red Caps
- International Association: Buffalo Bisons
- Pacific Coast: San Francisco Athletics (Semi-pro)

Inter-league playoff: Boston (NL) and Buffalo (IA) each won 1 game in 2-game series.

== Statistical leaders ==
National League
Stat	Player	Total
AVG	Paul Hines^{1} (PRO)	.358
HR	Paul Hines^{1} (PRO)	4
RBI	Paul Hines^{1} (PRO)	50
W	Tommy Bond (BSN)	40
ERA	John Ward (PRO)	1.51
K	Tommy Bond (BSN)	182

^{1} National League Triple Crown batting winner

== National League final standings ==
National League
Team	W	L	Pct.	GB	Home	Road
Boston Red Caps	41	19	.683	—	23‍–‍7	18‍–‍12
Cincinnati Reds	37	23	.617	4	25‍–‍8	12‍–‍15
Providence Grays	33	27	.550	8	17‍–‍13	16‍–‍14
Chicago White Stockings	30	30	.500	11	17‍–‍18	13‍–‍12
Indianapolis Blues	24	36	.400	17	10‍–‍17	14‍–‍19
Milwaukee Grays	15	45	.250	26	7‍–‍18	8‍–‍27

Locations of teams for the 1878 National League season
National League

== Notable seasons ==
- Providence Grays center fielder Paul Hines wins the NL triple crown with a .358 batting average, 4 home runs, and 50 runs batted in. He leads the league with a .849 OPS. His 177 OPS+ ranks second in the league.
- Boston Red Stockings pitcher Tommy Bond has a record of 40–19 and leads with NL with 532.2 innings pitched, 40 wins, 182 strikeouts, and 9 shutouts. He has a 2.06 earned run average and a 115 ERA+.

== Events ==
=== January–March ===
- February 6 – The Providence Grays are accepted into the National League.
- February 12 – Fred Thayer, Harvard team manager, receives a patent for the catching mask.
- March 8 – Devastated by the gambling scandal from 1877, The Louisville Grays withdraw from the National League after being unable to assemble a competitive team.
- March 27 – The National Association of Amateur Base Ball Players disbands.

=== April–June ===
- April 2 – The National League announces a group of 18 umpires who are eligible to umpire league games. The scheduling of those umpires is left to the individual clubs to decide.
- May 1 – In front of 5,500 fans at the brand new Messer Street Grounds, the Providence Grays lose the season opener to the defending champion Boston Red Caps 1–0. Mike "King" Kelly makes his major league debut in the home opener at Cincinnati.
- May 1 – Will White and Deacon White become the first brother pitcher-catcher battery in the Cincinnati Reds 6–4 win over the Milwaukee Grays.
- May 2 – The International Association commences regular season play with 12 teams as follows – Auburn, Binghamton Crickets, Brooklyn Blues, Buffalo Bisons, London Tecumsehs, Manchester Reds, New Bedford Whalers, New Haven Elm Citys, Pittsburgh Alleghenies, Rochester Flour Citys, Syracuse Stars and the Worcester Reds. The New York Clipper declares the new IA to be a "major league".
- May 7 – The IA's Auburn and Brooklyn teams disband leaving the circuit with 10 teams.
- May 8 – Paul Hines of the Providence Grays, who will win baseball's first triple crown in 1878, pulls off (arguably) the first unassisted triple play in major league history against the Boston Red Caps.
- May 9 – Sam Weaver of the Milwaukee Grays pitches a no-hitter against the Indianapolis Blues for Milwaukee's first National League victory. One scorer credited John Clapp with a single, but Weaver is generally recognized today with throwing the no-hitter.

=== July–September ===
- July 15 – John Montgomery Ward makes his debut for the Providence Grays. Ward will later start the Brotherhood of Professional Base-Ball Players in 1885, which leads to the formation of the Players' League in 1890. Ward would be elected to the Hall of Fame in 1964.
- August 14 – "The Only" Nolan is released by the Indianapolis Blues after lying to the team about attending a funeral.
- August 19 – In an embarrassing day for the National League, teams from the NL lose 3 of the 4 exhibition games played against non-league teams.
- August 25 – Bill Craver is certified eligible for play in the International Association. Craver had been kicked out of the National League after his involvement in a gambling scandal with the Louisville Grays in 1877.
- August 31 – Albert Spalding plays in the final game of his career, going 2–4 at the plate while committing 4 errors in the field.
- September 12 – The Boston Red Caps clinch the pennant with a 4–2 victory over the Indianapolis Blues.
- September 14 – The Indianapolis Blues and Boston Red Caps play an experimental exhibition game in which every pitch thrown is called a ball or strike and only allowing 6 balls before a walk is issued.
- September 30 – The National League completes its schedule, marking the first time in professional baseball that a full schedule has been played by all member teams.

=== October–December ===
- October 2 – The Buffalo Bisons of the International League defeat the National League champion Boston Red Caps behind the pitching of Pud Galvin. The victory over the Red Caps gives Galvin a win over each team in the NL. He finishes the 1878 season with a combined 10–5 record against the NL clubs. Buffalo will become a member of the National League in 1879.
- October 3 – The Syracuse Stars defeat Lowell 12–1 and claim the International Association championship. The Stars will join the National League in 1879.
- October 8 – The Buffalo Bisons defeat Utica and lay claim to the International Association pennant as well. The league will ultimately award the pennant to Buffalo in early 1879.
- October 18 – The Indianapolis Blues come up short $2,500 and are unable to account for the money. The players receive $60 each as payment for the remainder of the season. This event signals the end of the Blues.
- November 1 – The Boston Red Caps and the Providence Grays play an exhibition game with no outs on foul bounds and 6 balls for a walk to be given.
- November 10 – In the Pacific Coast championship game in California, the Athletics defeat the Californias in front of 8,000 fans at the San Francisco National Trotting Park.
- December 4 – The National League votes to accept the Buffalo Bisons, Syracuse Stars and the Cleveland Blues for the 1879 season.
- December 4 – The National League changes the rules so that now every pitched ball is called a ball or a strike. 9 balls will now result in a walk to the batter. The rules are also changed regarding the batting order. The first batter in a new inning shall now be the next batter in the order after the last batter that ended the previous inning.
- December 5 – The National League abolishes all bound outs, including foul balls on 3rd strikes.
- December 10 – The Troy Trojans apply for membership to the National League.
- December 29 – The Professional Baseball League of Cuba is founded in Havana with Habana defeating Almendares 21–20. The league is known today as the Cuban League and ran continuously until March, 1961, when the Cuban government, ran by Fidel Castro, abolished professional baseball.

== Births ==
- January 12 – William Matthews
- February 13 – Bill Bradley
- February 18 – Frederick Westervelt
- March 6 – Bert Husting
- April 4 – Jake Volz
- April 24 – Charlie Graham
- April 27
  - Charlie Chech
  - George Winter
- May 13 – Frank Hemphill
- May 14 – J. L. Wilkinson
- May 24 – Jack Pfiester
- May 30 – Mike Donlin
- June 5 – Fred Mitchell
- June 13 – Bill Bergen
- July 12 – Bill Coughlin
- July 24 – Chris Lindsay
- October 6 – Len Swormstedt
- October 10 – Otto Hess
- October 27 – Shad Barry
- November 10 – Cy Morgan
- November 23 – Jimmy Sheckard
- November 29 – Long Tom Hughes

== Deaths ==
- March 31 – Henry Burroughs, 33, outfielder for the 1871–72 Washington Olympics.
- October 2 – Lewis Meacham, 32, umpire for one game during the 1875 National Association season.
