= Sammy Sosa =

Dominican baseball player (born 1968)

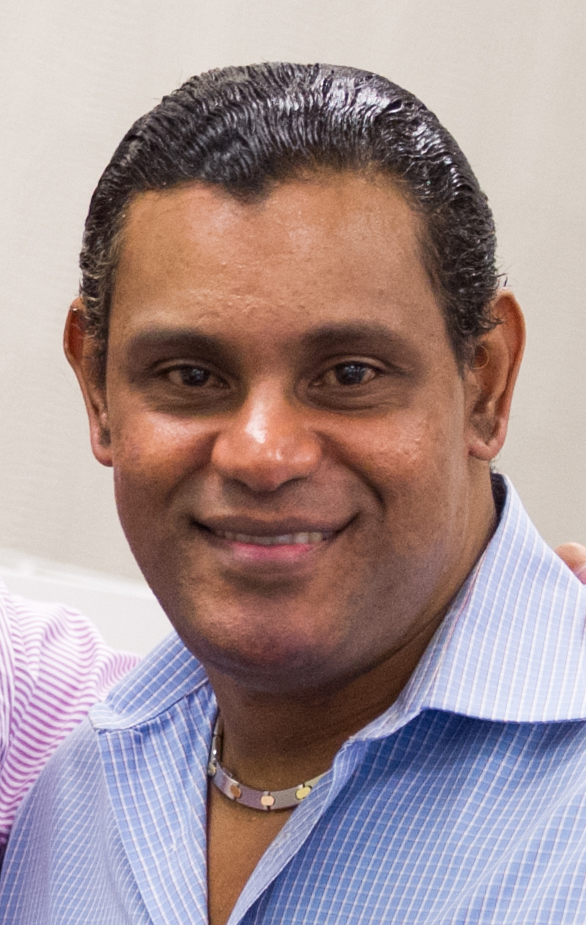
- Sosa in 2012
- Right fielder
- Born: November 12, 1968 (age 58); San Pedro de Macorís, Dominican Republic
- Batted: Right Threw: Right

MLB debut
- June 16, 1989, for the Texas Rangers

Last MLB appearance
- September 29, 2007, for the Texas Rangers

MLB statistics
- Batting average: .273
- Hits: 2,408
- Home runs: 609
- Runs batted in: 1,667
- Stats at Baseball Reference

Teams
- Texas Rangers (1989); Chicago White Sox (1989–1991); Chicago Cubs (1992–2004); Baltimore Orioles (2005); Texas Rangers (2007)

Career highlights and awards
- 7× All-Star (1995, 1998–2002, 2004); NL MVP (1998); 6× Silver Slugger Award (1995, 1998–2002); NL Hank Aaron Award (1999); Roberto Clemente Award (1998); 2× NL home run leader (2000, 2002); 2× NL RBI leader (1998, 2001); Commissioner's Historic Achievement Award; Chicago Cubs Hall of Fame

Samuel Peralta Sosa (/ˈsoʊsə/; born November 12, 1968) is a Dominican former professional baseball right fielder. He played in Major League Baseball (MLB) for 18 seasons, primarily with the Chicago Cubs. After playing for the Texas Rangers and Chicago White Sox, Sosa joined the Cubs in 1992 and became regarded as one of the game's best hitters. He hit his 400th home run in his 1,354th game and his 5,273rd at-bat, reaching this milestone quicker than any player in National League history. Sosa is one of nine players in MLB history to hit 600 career home runs.

In 1998, Sosa, along with Mark McGwire, achieved international fame for his home run-hitting prowess in pursuit of Roger Maris' single-season home-run record. With the Cubs, Sosa became a seven-time All-Star while holding numerous team records. He finished his career with stints with the Baltimore Orioles and the Rangers for a second time. With the Rangers, Sosa hit his 600th career home run to become the fifth player in MLB history to reach the milestone.

Nicknamed "Slammin' Sammy", Sosa is second all-time in home runs among foreign-born MLB players and is one of only three National League players since 1900 to reach 160 RBIs in one season (2001). He is also the only player to have hit 60 or more home runs in a single season three times, which he accomplished in 1998, 1999, and 2001. Sosa did not lead the league in home runs in any of those seasons, although he did lead the league in 2000 with 50 home runs, and in 2002 with 49.

In a 2005 congressional hearing, Sosa—through his attorney—denied having used performance-enhancing drugs during his playing career, following multiple accusations. In a 2024 public statement, Sosa admitted to having made "mistakes" recovering from injuries during his career.

== Early life ==
Sosa was born on November 12, 1968, in the Dominican Republic. Though born in a Batey community in Consuelo, his official registered birthplace is San Pedro de Macorís, which was "the largest town nearby". Sosa is known to family and friends as "Mikey". His maternal grandmother suggested his birth name of Samuel, and also came up with his nickname: "[She] heard the name on a soap opera she liked and decided from that moment on he would be Mikey."

== Professional career ==
=== Minor Leagues (1989) ===
Prior to making his major league debut, Sosa played for the Tulsa Drillers and Oklahoma City 89ers.

=== Texas Rangers (1989) ===
Sosa made his major league debut on June 16, 1989, with the Texas Rangers, wearing #17 and leading off as the starting left fielder. He hit his first career home run off Roger Clemens.

=== Chicago White Sox (1989–1991) ===
On July 29, 1989, the Rangers traded Sosa with Wilson Álvarez and Scott Fletcher to the Chicago White Sox for Harold Baines and Fred Manrique. In 1990, Sosa batted .233 with 15 home runs, 70 runs batted in, 10 triples, and 32 stolen bases. He also struck out 150 times, fourth most in the American League. Sosa started the 1991 season by hitting two home runs and driving in five runs. However, he slumped for the rest of the year and batted .203 with 10 home runs and 33 runs batted in.

=== Chicago Cubs (1992–2004) ===
The White Sox traded Sosa and Ken Patterson to the Chicago Cubs for outfielder George Bell before the 1992 season. Sosa batted .260 with eight home runs and 25 RBIs in his first season with the Cubs. In 1993, Sosa batted .261 with 33 home runs with 93 RBIs. He also showed his speed by stealing 38 bases and became the Cubs' first 30-30 player. Sosa continued to hit for power and speed in 1994 but he also improved his batting average. He ended up batting .300 with 25 home runs, 70 RBIs, and 22 stolen bases. Sosa was named to his first All-Star team in 1995. In 144 games, he batted .268 with 36 home runs and 119 RBIs. Sosa continued his success with the Cubs in 1996 as he batted .273 with 40 home runs and 100 RBIs. However, in 1997, Sosa batted just .251 with a .300 on-base percentage, and led the league in strikeouts with 174 despite hitting 36 home runs with 119 RBIs.

After years as a respected power/speed threat with a rocket arm in right field, he emerged during the 1998 season as one of baseball's greatest. It was in this season that both Sosa and Mark McGwire were involved in the "home run record chase", when both players' prowess for hitting home runs drew national attention as they attempted to pass Roger Maris' single season home run mark of 61 home runs. In the early months of the year, Sosa trailed McGwire significantly, being as many as 16 homers behind at one point in May. But as the chase progressed, Sosa eventually tied McGwire with 46 home runs on August 10. However, McGwire pulled away slightly and reached 62 home runs to break the record first on September 8. Sosa tied McGwire once again at 62 on September 13. Eleven days later, with two games left to play in the season, the two were tied at 66 home runs each. Sosa ended the season with 66, finishing behind McGwire's 70. It was during that season that Cubs announcer Chip Caray nicknamed him "Slammin' Sammy", a nickname that quickly spread. Sammy produced then career-highs in batting average and slugging percentage, at .308 and .647 respectively. Sosa also led the league in RBIs and runs scored.

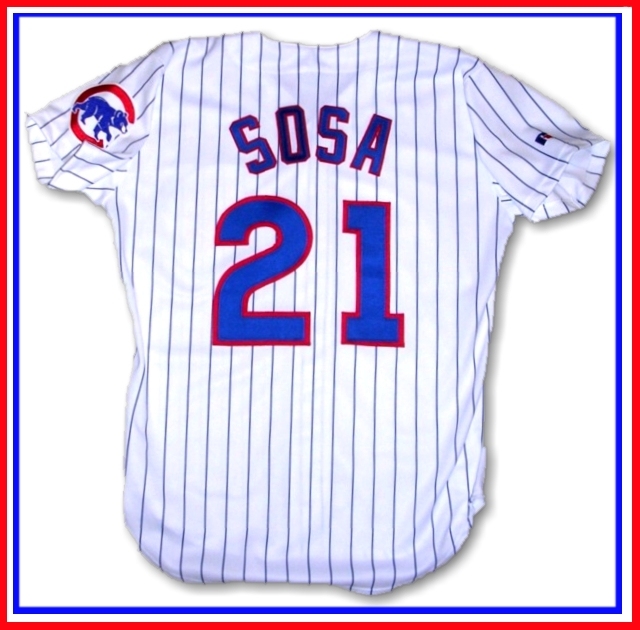
Sosa wore #21 with the Cubs in honor of his childhood idol Roberto Clemente

Also in 1998, Sosa's 416 total bases were the most in a single season since Stan Musial's 429 in 1948. Sosa's performance in the month of June, during which Sosa belted 20 home runs, knocked in 47 runs, and posted an .842 slugging percentage, was one of the greatest offensive outbursts in major league history. Sosa won the National League Most Valuable Player Award for leading the Cubs into the playoffs in 1998, earning every first-place vote except for the two cast by St. Louis writers, who voted for McGwire. He and McGwire shared Sports Illustrated's 1998 "Sportsman of the Year" award, as well as The Sporting News Sportsman of the Year honor. Sosa was honored with a ticker-tape parade in his honor in New York City, and he was invited to be a guest at US President Bill Clinton's 1999 State of the Union Address. 1998 was also the first time the Cubs made the post-season since 1989. The Cubs qualified as the NL Wild Card team, but were swept by the Atlanta Braves in the NLDS. In the 1999 season, Sosa hit 63 home runs, again trailing Mark McGwire, who hit 65. In the 2000 season, Sosa led the league by hitting 50 home runs. He received the Babe Ruth Home Run Award for leading MLB in homers.

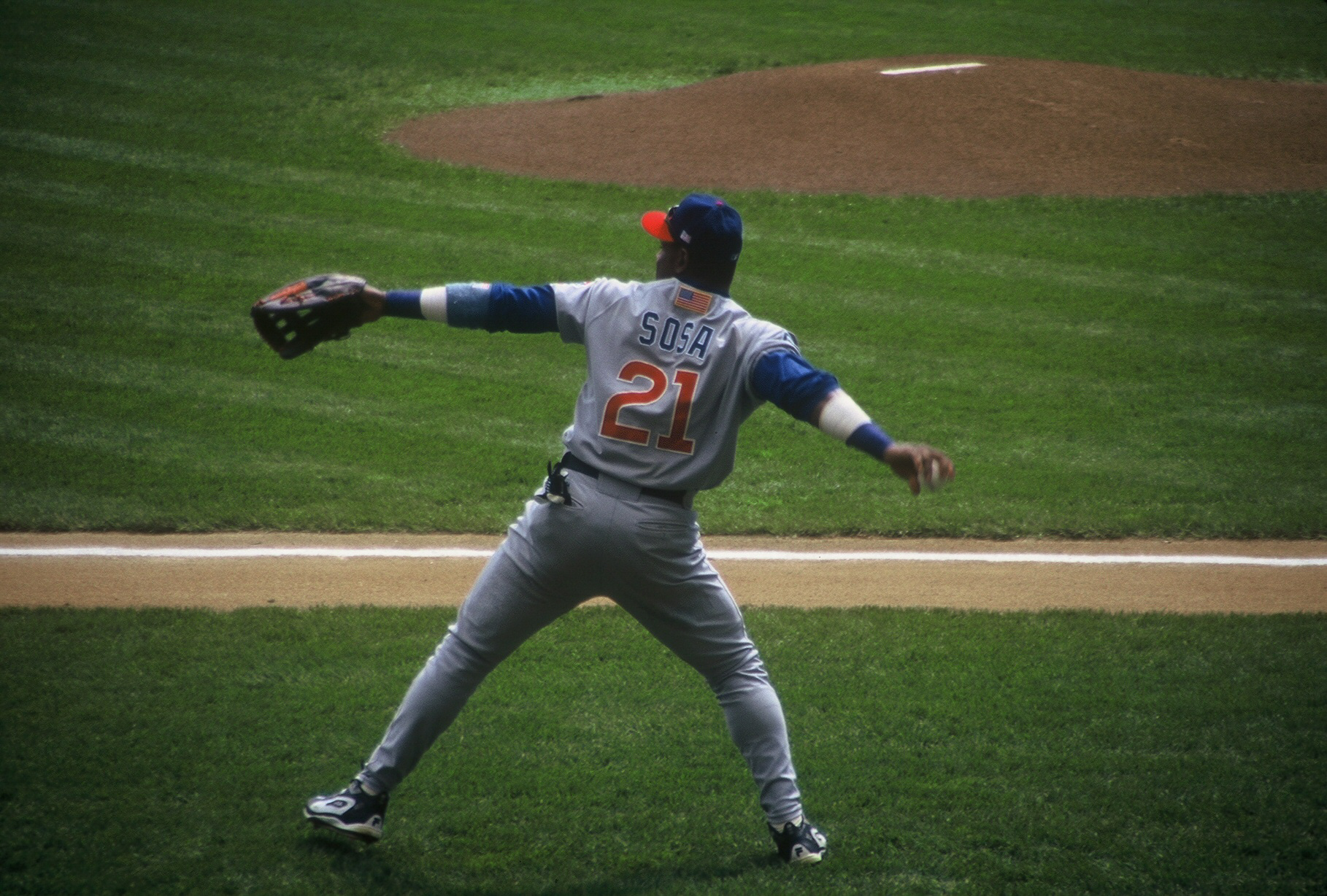
Sosa as a member of the Chicago Cubs

In 2001, he hit 64 home runs, becoming the first player to hit 60 or more home runs three times. However, he did not lead the league in any of those seasons; in 2001, he finished behind Barry Bonds, who hit 73 homers, breaking the single-season home run record set by McGwire in 1998 (70). In 2001, he also set personal records in runs scored (146), RBI (160), walks (116), on-base percentage (.437), slugging percentage (.737), and batting average (.328). He led the majors in runs and RBI, was second in home runs, second in slugging percentage, first in total bases, third in walks, fourth in on-base percentage, 12th in batting average, and 15th in hits. He also surpassed his 1998 number in total bases, racking up 425. Sosa once again led the league in home runs with 49 in 2002. In recognition of his accomplishments as a hitter, Sosa won the Silver Slugger Award (an award for offensive output, voted on by managers and coaches) in 1995 and in 1998 through 2002.

In 2003, the Cubs won the National League Central Division title. In May, he spent his first period on the disabled list since 1996 after having an injured toenail removed. On June 3, 2003, Sosa was ejected from a Chicago Cubs-Tampa Bay Devil Rays game in the first inning when umpires discovered he had been using a corked bat. Major League Baseball confiscated and tested 76 of Sosa's other bats after his ejection; all were found to be clean, with no cork. Five bats he had sent to the Hall of Fame in past years were also tested, and were all clean as well. Sosa stated that he had accidentally used the corked bat, which he claimed he only used during batting practice, and apologized for the incident. When Cubs manager Dusty Baker was interviewed later, he stated any use of corked bats on his team is strictly prohibited. On June 6, Sosa was suspended for eight games all without pay which was reduced to seven games (again without pay) on June 11 after appeal. Sosa finished the season with 40 home runs and hit two more in the 2003 NLCS against the Florida Marlins, falling to the team in seven games.

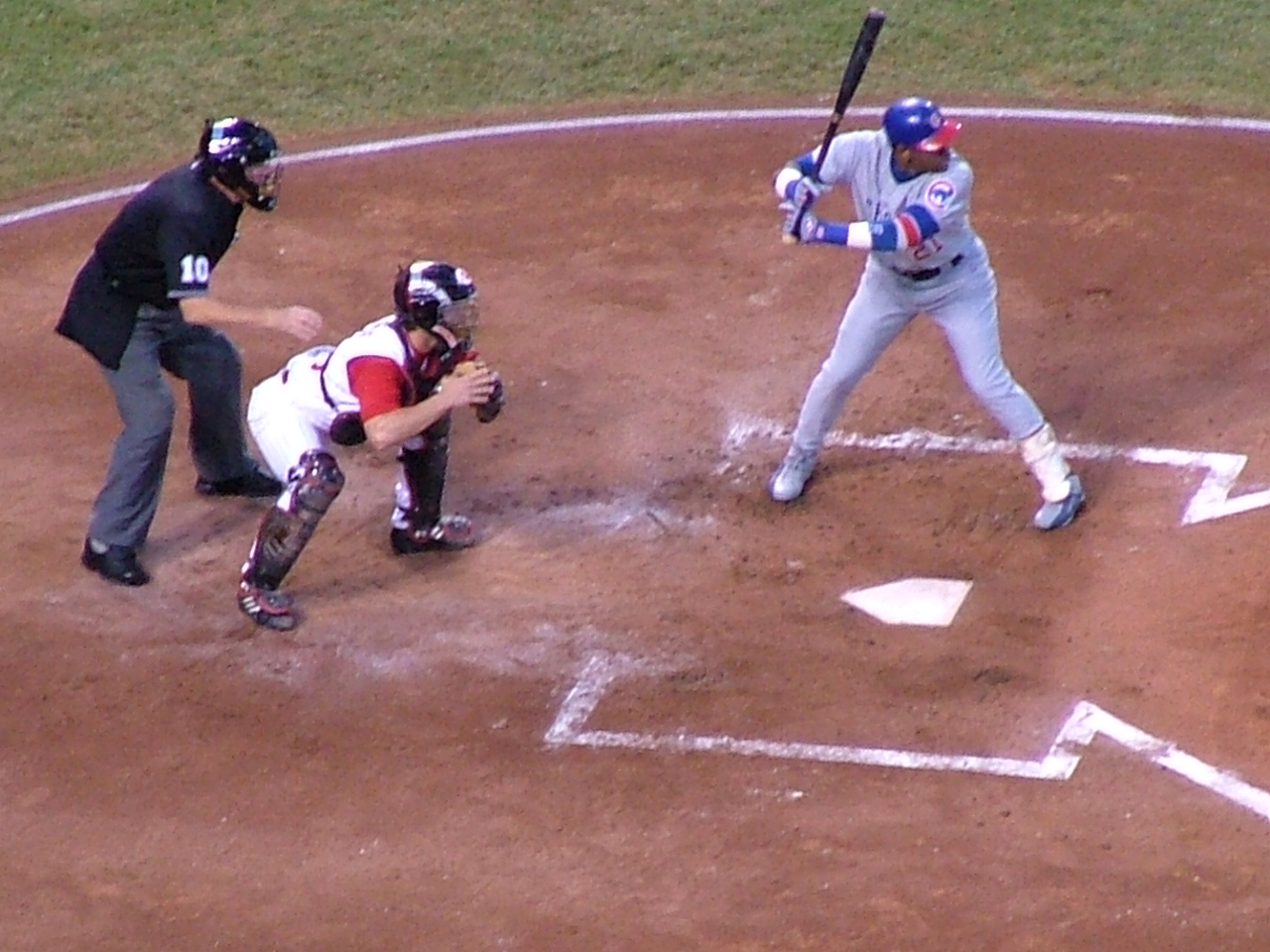
Sosa in 2004

In May 2004, Sosa suffered an odd injury while sitting next to his locker chatting with reporters before a game in San Diego's Petco Park. He sneezed very violently, causing severe back pain. He was diagnosed with back spasms and placed on the disabled list. He finished with 35 homers, far below his numbers of his best years. Despite his declining production and release from the team at the end of the 2004 season, between 1995 and 2004 Sosa clubbed 479 home runs which is the most home runs by a player in history over a 10-year span. He also owns numerous team records for the Cubs and he holds the major-league record for the most home runs hit in a month (20, in June 1998). His tenure came to an end without fanfare, as he did not play in the final game of the regular season (played in Chicago) per his request, with Sosa reportedly leaving Wrigley Field before the game had ended. Sosa had stated he had permission from Baker to not play, while Baker stated that former assistant trainer Sandy Krum (serving as the go-between for the two) told Baker that Sosa had felt a bit injured and wanted out of the final game, but he expected Sosa to be on the bench with the rest of the players who weren't in the starting lineup.

=== Baltimore Orioles (2005) ===
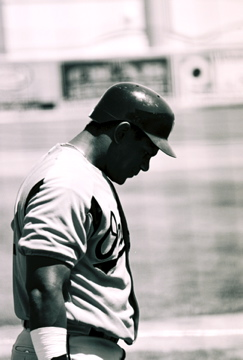
Sosa in spring training with the Orioles in 2005

On January 28, 2005, the Cubs traded Sosa to the Baltimore Orioles in exchange for infielder-outfielder Jerry Hairston Jr., infielder Mike Fontenot, and RHP Dave Crouthers. To facilitate the deal, Sosa and his agent agreed to waive the clause that guaranteed his 2006 salary, and the players' union indicated it would not object to that agreement. Under the deal, Sosa earned $17.875 million for the 2005 season, with the Cubs paying $7 million of his salary. By playing for the 2005 Orioles alongside fellow 500-home-run batter Rafael Palmeiro, Sosa and Palmeiro became the first 500 home run club members in history to play together on the same team after reaching the 500 home run plateau. (Note: Hank Aaron reached 500 homers shortly after his teammate Eddie Mathews (512 homers) retired.) Sosa finished the 2005 season batting .221 with 14 home runs, his worst performance since 1992, and continuing his post-2001 trend of declines in batting average, homers, total bases, and RBI. On December 7, 2005, the Orioles decided not to offer him an arbitration contract, effectively ending his Baltimore Orioles tenure and making him a free agent.

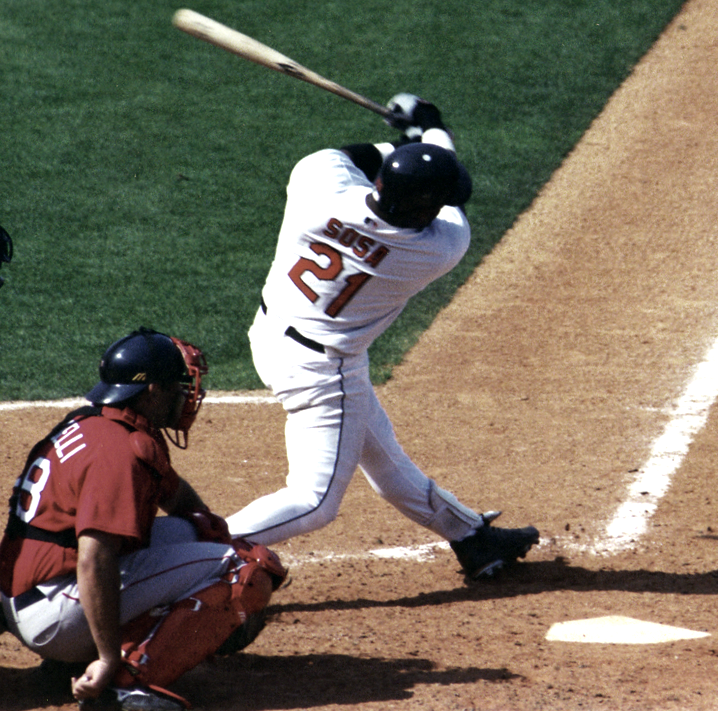
Sosa with the Orioles in 2005

In 2005, The Sporting News published an update of their 1999 book Baseball's 100 Greatest Players. Sosa did not make the original edition, but for the 2005 update, with his career totals considerably higher, he was ranked at Number 95. During a stretch of nine consecutive years, Sosa hit 35 or more home runs and 100+ RBIs, all with the Chicago Cubs.

=== Year off (2006) ===
At the end of January 2006, the Washington Nationals offered Sosa two different minor-league offers, both of which he turned down. On February 15, 2006, Sosa's agent Adam Katz stated: "We're not going to put him on the retirement list. We decided that [not putting him on that list] was the best thing to do. But I can say, with reasonable certainty, that we've seen Sammy in a baseball uniform for the last time." During that year, Sosa accompanied President Leonel Fernández of the Dominican Republic on several diplomatic trips including to the United States, Japan, and Taiwan.

=== Texas Rangers (2007) ===
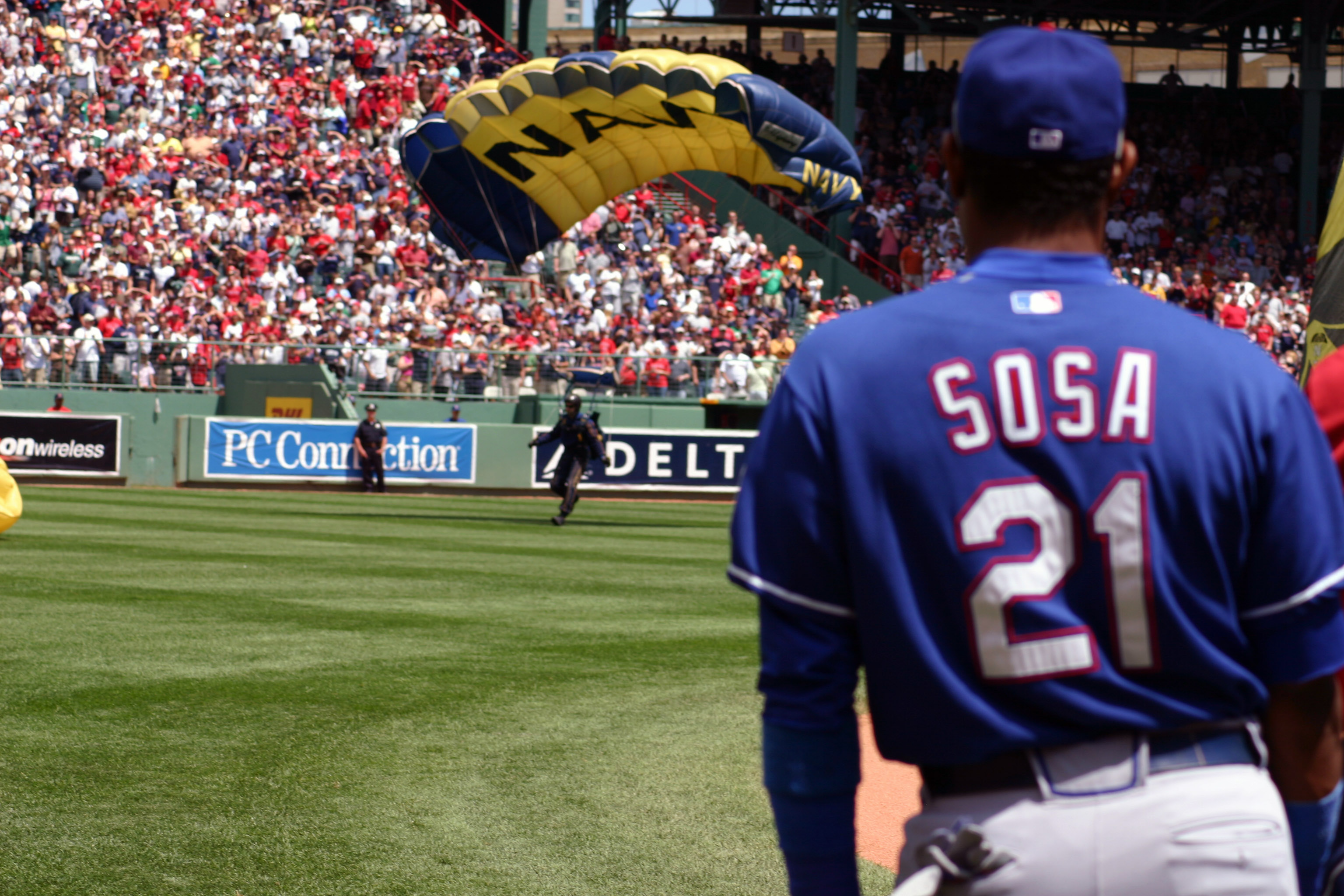
Sosa played his final MLB season with the Rangers in 2007 before retiring two years later.

The Texas Rangers, Sosa's original team, signed him to a minor league deal worth $500,000 on January 30, 2007. This was the same contract that Sosa turned down the previous year from the Nationals. The contract included an invitation to spring training, where Sosa competed for a spot in the lineup with Nelson Cruz, Jason Botts, and other rookies/prospects. Sosa was successful during spring training and was added to the team's 25-man roster. He started the 2007 season as the Rangers' designated hitter and occasional right fielder. At the same time, the Chicago Cubs awarded Sosa's number 21 to new pitcher Jason Marquis, who coincidentally served up Sosa's 600th career home run. This caused some concern, due to Sosa's accomplishments with the Cubs, including his status as the Cubs' all-time home run leader.

On April 26, 2007, Sosa made history by hitting a home run in his 45th major league ballpark. He has also homered in The Ballpark at Disney's Wide World of Sports, near Orlando, Florida, a usually minor-league and Spring training park that hosted a regular season series between the Rangers and the Tampa Bay Devil Rays in May 2007, although he did not hit a homer at the two regular season games the Cubs played at the Tokyo Dome in 2000 vs. the Mets. On June 20, 2007, Sosa hit a home run off of Jason Marquis during an inter-league game against the Chicago Cubs. Sosa became only the fifth man in history, following Babe Ruth, Willie Mays, Hank Aaron, and Barry Bonds, to hit 600 regular season home runs. The home run was the first one that Sosa had recorded against the Cubs, and as a result he has hit a home run against every active MLB team. Sosa is the Cubs' all-time home run leader, having hit 545 with that team.

=== End of career (2008–2009) ===
On May 28, 2008, Sosa announced that he instructed his agent not to offer his services to any MLB team for the 2008 season, and planned on filing for retirement, but never did. On December 25, 2008, Sosa announced he intended to unretire and play in the World Baseball Classic and once again test the free agent market in hopes of signing with a Major League ballclub in 2009. Sosa said that he had been keeping in shape at his home, and was hoping that after a strong World Baseball Classic he would prove to major-league teams that he was still capable of playing in MLB. However, he was not selected as part of the Dominican Republic's roster. He remained a free agent and did not actively look for a team.

On June 3, 2009, Sosa announced his intention to retire from baseball. He made the announcement in the Dominican Republic and said that he was calmly looking forward to his induction into the Baseball Hall of Fame since his statistics were up to par.

== Drug test controversy ==
On June 16, 2009, The New York Times reported that Sosa was on a list of players who had tested positive for performance-enhancing drugs in 2003, in baseball's steroids scandal. The paper stated that this information had been obtained from unnamed attorneys with knowledge of Major League Baseball drug test results from 2003.

Previously, Sosa sat alongside Rafael Palmeiro, Jose Canseco, and Mark McGwire at a hearing before the United States Congress. His attorney testified on his behalf, stating, "To be clear, I have never taken illegal performance-enhancing drugs. I have never injected myself or had anyone inject me with anything. I have not broken the laws of the United States or the laws of the Dominican Republic. I have been tested as recently as 2004, and I am clean."

On December 19, 2024, Sosa released a somewhat ambiguous public statement through his PR firm, stating, "There were times I did whatever I could to recover from injuries in an effort to keep my strength up to perform over 162 games. I never broke any laws, but in hindsight, I made mistakes and I apologize." Almost immediately, Cubs chairman Thomas S. Ricketts responded with a statement of his own, inviting Sosa to the 2025 Cubs Convention: "We appreciate Sammy releasing his statement and for reaching out. No one played harder or wanted to win more…We plan on inviting him to the 2025 Cubs Convention and, while it is short notice, we hope that he can attend. We are all ready to move forward together."

== National Baseball Hall of Fame consideration ==
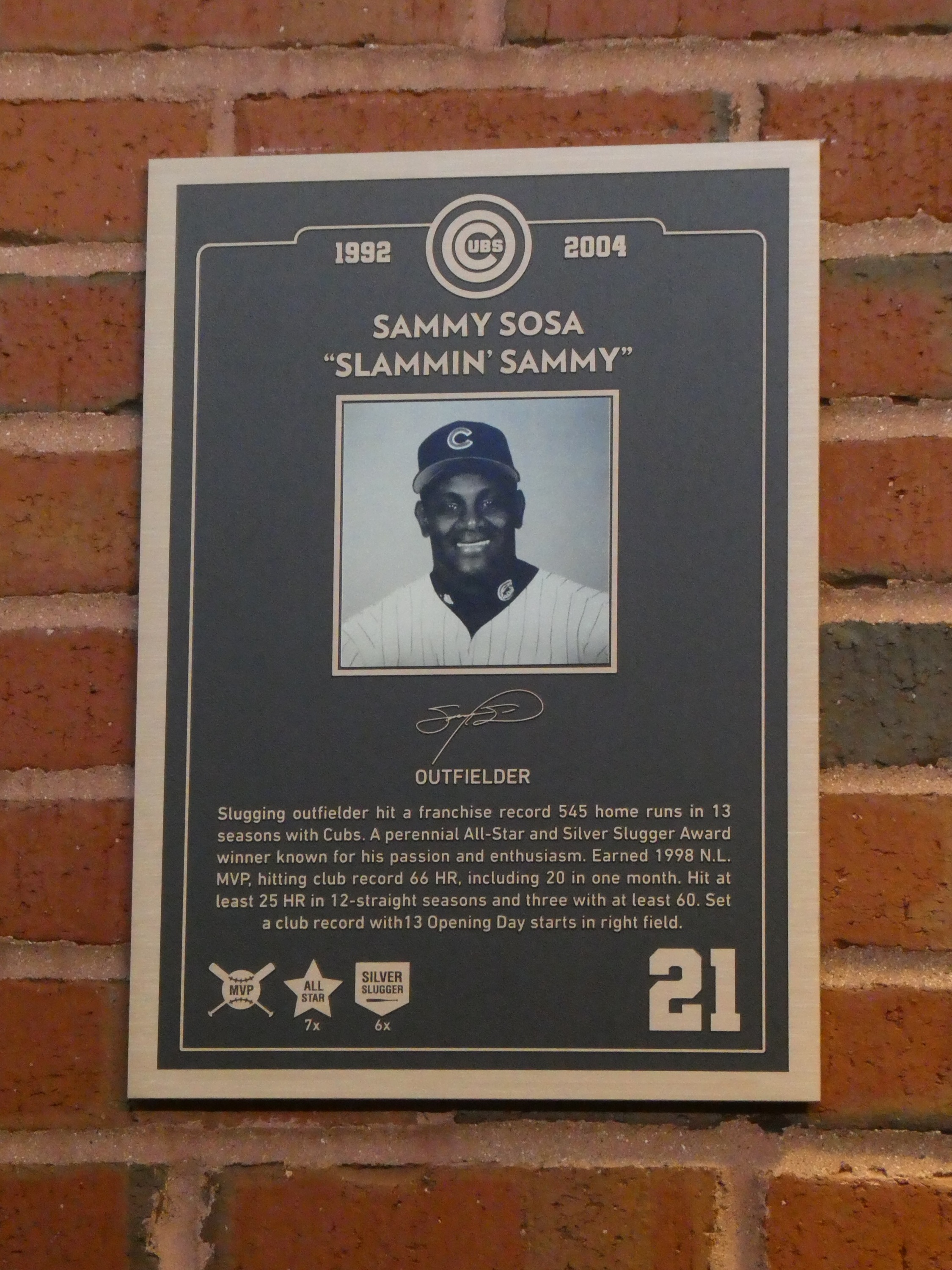
Sosa's plaque in the Chicago Cubs Hall of Fame at Wrigley Field

In an interview with ESPN Deportes, Sosa said he would "calmly wait" for his induction into the National Baseball Hall of Fame, for which he became eligible in 2013. In results announced on January 9, 2013, Sosa was not elected by the Baseball Writers' Association of America (BBWAA) into baseball's Hall of Fame in Cooperstown, New York, receiving 12.5% in his first year on the ballot—the requirement for election is 75%. In the following years, his voting percentage dropped as low as 6.6% in 2015 to a high of 17% in 2021. A candidate remains eligible for inclusion on subsequent ballots as long as he receives a minimum of 5.0% of the vote in a given year, and is removed from consideration by the BBWAA after 10 years of not being elected; thus, Sosa's final appearance was on the 2022 ballot, where he received 18.5% of votes.

Sosa may still be inducted into the Hall of Fame if recommended by the Hall of Fame's Contemporary Baseball Era Veterans Committee, which may elect players outside of the 10-year BBWAA eligibility window. However, the steroid ties and suspicions that prevented Sosa from previously being voted into the Hall of Fame, along with players like Barry Bonds and Roger Clemens, have made that seem unlikely.

== Personal life ==
Sosa married Sonia Rodríguez, a former Dominican TV dancer, in 1991. They have six children. He was formerly married to Karen Lee Bright for eight months beginning in 1990. Sosa is Catholic.

In 2009, Sosa appeared at a music awards show looking much lighter in complexion than he had just months earlier. The buzz around this drastic change prompted him to go on a Spanish-language television station to deny that he was ill, or that he hated being dark-skinned, or that his new skin tone was the result of steroid use. Sosa explained that he uses a bleaching cream before going to bed which softens and lightens his skin.

=== Politics ===
Sosa has long been affiliated with the Dominican Liberation Party (PLD). He was reportedly a close friend of President Leonel Fernandez, accompanied Fernandez on diplomatic trips to East Asia in 2006, served as a business ambassador for the Dominican Republic after his retirement from baseball and campaigned with Danilo Medina and PLD legislators ahead of the 2016 Dominican Republic general election. Sosa has persistently been rumored to be a potential candidate for elected office in the Dominican Republic. In 2006 and again in 2018, he told reporters that he was not interested in running for office. However, during a livestreamed interview in 2013, when asked if he would consider running for president of the Dominican Republic, he answered "You never know. If that moment came in, I would be ready." In 2016, Sosa was interrogated for four hours by Dominican authorities in connection with an anticorruption investigation centering on President Medina's brother, Alexis. He was ultimately not charged with any crimes.

Sosa became close friends with Donald Trump in 1998 and considered Hillary Clinton a friend as of 2000. During a debate prior to the 2000 Republican Party presidential primaries, candidate George W. Bush said that his greatest mistake in life came in his role as owner of the Texas Rangers when he authorized the trade that sent Sosa from the Rangers to the White Sox. According to an unsubstantiated tip contained in the Epstein files, in 2004 or 2005, Sosa attended a party with Trump and Jeffrey Epstein. As with many people named in the files, his inclusion "highlight[ed] the complexity of Epstein-related disclosure" given that "claim[s] regarding the alleged party remain[] unproven" and that no explicit allegation was made that Sosa was involved in any criminal activity. Sosa donated $5,400 to the Hillary Clinton 2016 presidential campaign. During a podcast appearance before the 2024 United States presidential election, Trump and Patrick Bet-David mocked Sosa's lightening complexion in reference to questions about Kamala Harris' racial identity.

== See also ==
- 30–30 club
- 50 home run club
- List of Afro-Latinos
- List of Major League Baseball players from the Dominican Republic
- List of Major League Baseball annual runs scored leaders
- List of Major League Baseball career runs batted in leaders
- List of Major League Baseball career runs scored leaders
- List of Major League Baseball career stolen bases leaders
- List of Major League Baseball home run records
- List of Major League Baseball runs-batted-in champions
- List of Major League Baseball single-game hits leaders

== Notes ==
Awards and achievements
Preceded by Dante Bichette; Mark McGwire; Matt Williams; Jeff Kent; Jeff Bagwell	National League Player of the Month; July 1996; June 1998; May 1999; July 2000; August 2001	Succeeded by Ken Caminiti; Vladimir Guerrero; Jeromy Burnitz; Todd Helton; Barry Bonds
