= List of Chicago Cubs team records =

The following lists statistical records and all-time leaders as well as awards and major accomplishments for the Chicago Cubs professional baseball club of Major League Baseball. The records list the top 5 players in each category since the inception of the Cubs.

Players that are still active with the Cubs are denoted in bold. Records updated as of August 5, 2011.

== Single Season Records ==
**MLB Record** (1876–present)	**Cubs All-Time Record** (1876–present)	**Cubs Post-1900 Record** (1900–present) (Note: The Official Chicago Cubs Website does not recognize accomplishments before 1900, but they are listed on the Official MLB Website and Baseball-Reference.com)

=== Team ===
==== Best Franchise Seasons (Note: Determined by winning percentage, minimum of 120 games played.) ====
Rank	Season	Wins	Losses	Win%	Postseason
1	1906	116	36	.763	Lost World Series (Chicago White Sox) 2–4
2	1886	90	34	.726	
3	1907	107	45	.704	Won World Series (Detroit Tigers) 4–0
4	1909	104	49	.680	
5	1910	104	50	.675	Lost World Series (Philadelphia Athletics) 1–4
6	1918	84	45	.651	Lost World Series (Boston Red Sox) 2–4
7	1935	100	54	.649	Lost World Series (Detroit Tigers) 2–4
8	1929	98	54	.645	Lost World Series (Philadelphia Athletics) 1–4
9	1908	99	55	.643	Won World Series (Detroit Tigers) 4–1
10	2016	103	58	.640	Won World Series (Cleveland Indians) 4–3

==== Worst Franchise Seasons ====
Rank	Year	Team	Wins	Losses	Win%
1	1962	Chicago Cubs	59	103	.364
	1966	Chicago Cubs	59	103	.364
3	2012	Chicago Cubs	61	101	.377
4	1901	Chicago Orphans	53	86	.381
5	1956	Chicago Cubs	60	94	.390
	1960	Chicago Cubs	60	94	.390

=== Batting ===
==== Batting average ====
Rank	Player	Amount	Year
1	Ross Barnes	.429	1876
2	Cap Anson	.399	1881
3	Bill Lange	.389	1895
4	King Kelly	.388	1886
5	Rogers Hornsby	.380	1929

==== Hits ====
Rank	Player	Amount	Year
1	Rogers Hornsby	229	1929
2	Kiki Cuyler	228	1930
3	Billy Herman	227	1935
4	Woody English	214	1930
5	Frank Demaree	212	1936

==== Singles ====
Rank	Player	Amount	Year
1	Bill Everitt	169	1898
2	Bill Everitt	168	1895
3	Sparky Adams	165	1927
4	Frank Demaree	159	1936
5	Jigger Statz	158	1923

==== Doubles ====
Rank	Player	Amount	Year
1	Billy Herman	57	1935
	Billy Herman	57	1936
3	Mark Grace	51	1995
4	Kiki Cuyler	50	1930
	Derrek Lee	50	2005

==== Triples ====
Rank	Player	Amount	Year
1	Frank Schulte	21	1913
	Vic Saier	21	1911
3	Bill Dahlen	19	1892
	Bill Dahlen	19	1896
	Ryne Sandberg	19	1984

==== Home Runs ====
Rank	Player	Amount	Year
1	Sammy Sosa	66	1998
2	Sammy Sosa	64	2001
3	Sammy Sosa	63	1999
4	Hack Wilson	56	1930
5	Sammy Sosa	50	2000

==== Extra Base Hits ====
Rank	Player	Amount	Year
1	Sammy Sosa	103	2001
2	Derrek Lee	99	2005
3	Hack Wilson	97	1930
4	Rogers Hornsby	94	1929
5	Sammy Sosa	89	1999
	Sammy Sosa	89	2000

==== Grand Slams ====
Rank	Player	Amount	Year
1	Ernie Banks	5	1955
2	Frank Schulte	4	1911
3	Sammy Sosa	3	1998

==== RBIs ====
Rank	Player	Amount	Year
1	Hack Wilson	191	1930
2	Sammy Sosa	160	2001
3	Hack Wilson	159	1929
4	Sammy Sosa	158	1998
5	Rogers Hornsby	149	1929

==== Runs ====
Rank	Player	Amount	Year
1	Rogers Hornsby	156	1929
2	King Kelly	155	1886
	Kiki Cuyler	155	1930
4	Woody English	152	1930
5	George Gore	150	1886

==== Walks ====
Rank	Player	Amount	Year
1	Jimmy Sheckard	147	1911
2	Jimmy Sheckard	122	1912
3	Richie Ashburn	116	1960
	Sammy Sosa	116	2001
5	Cap Anson	113	1890

==== Total Bases ====
Rank	Player	Amount	Year
1	Sammy Sosa	425	2001
2	Hack Wilson	423	1930
3	Sammy Sosa	416	1998
4	Rogers Hornsby	409	1929
5	Sammy Sosa	397	1999

==== Stolen Bases ====
Rank	Player	Amount	Year
1	Bill Lange	84	1896
2	Walt Wilmot	76	1890
3	Walt Wilmot	74	1894
4	Bill Lange	73	1897
5	Bill Lange	67	1895
	Frank Chance	67	1903

==== Strikeouts ====
Rank	Player	Amount	Year
1	Sammy Sosa	174	1997
2	Sammy Sosa	171	1998
	Sammy Sosa	171	1999
4	Sammy Sosa	168	2000
	Corey Patterson	168	2004

==== On-Base Percentage ====
Rank	Player	Amount	Year
1	King Kelly	.483	1886
2	Ross Barnes	.462	1876
3	Rogers Hornsby	.459	1929
4	Bill Lange	.456	1895
5	Hack Wilson	.454	1930

==== Slugging Percentage ====
Rank	Player	Amount	Year
1	Sammy Sosa	.737	2001
2	Hack Wilson	.723	1930
3	Rogers Hornsby	.679	1929
4	Derrek Lee	.662	2005
5	Sammy Sosa	.647	1998

==== OPS ====
Rank	Player	Amount	Year
1	Hack Wilson	1.177	1930
2	Sammy Sosa	1.174	2001
3	Rogers Hornsby	1.138	1929
4	Derrek Lee	1.080	2005
5	Hack Wilson	1.043	1929

==== Hitting Streak ====
Rank	Player	Amount	Year
1	Bill Dahlen	42	1894
2	Cal McVey	30	1876
	Jerome Walton	30	1989
4	Jimmy Ryan	29	1892
5	Bill Dahlen	28	1894
	Ron Santo	28	1966

=== Pitching ===
==== Wins ====
Rank	Player	Amount	Year
1	John Clarkson	53	1885
2	Al Spalding	47	1876
3	Bill Hutchison	44	1891
4	Larry Corcoran	43	1880
5	Bill Hutchison	42	1890
14	Mordecai Brown	29	1908

==== ERA ====
Rank	Player	Amount	Year
1	Mordecai Brown	1.04	1906
2	Jack Pfiester	1.15	1907
3	Carl Lundgren	1.17	1907
4	Mordecai Brown	1.31	1909
5	Jack Taylor	1.33	1902

==== Saves ====
Rank	Player	Amount	Year
1	Randy Myers	53	1993
2	Rod Beck	51	1998
3	Randy Myers	38	1995
	Carlos Mármol	38	2010
5	Bruce Sutter	37	1979

==== Strikeouts ====
Rank	Player	Amount	Year
1	Bill Hutchison	314	1892
2	John Clarkson	313	1886
3	John Clarkson	308	1885
4	Bill Hutchison	289	1890
5	Fergie Jenkins	274	1970

== Career Records ==
=== Batting ===
==== Batting average ====
Rank	Player	Amount	Years played
1	Riggs Stephenson	.336	1926–1934
	Bill Madlock	.336	1974–1976
3	Bill Lange	.330	1893–1899
4	Cap Anson	.329	1876–1897
5	Kiki Cuyler	.325	1928–1935

==== Hits ====
Rank	Player	Amount	Years played
1	Cap Anson	2995	1876–1897
2	Ernie Banks	2583	1953–1971
3	Billy Williams	2510	1959–1974
4	Ryne Sandberg	2385	1982–1994; 1996–1997
5	Mark Grace	2201	1988–2000

==== Singles ====
Rank	Player	Amount	Years played
1	Cap Anson	2246	1876–1897
2	Stan Hack	1692	1932–1947
3	Billy Williams	1629	1959–1974
4	Ryne Sandberg	1624	1982–1994; 1996–1997
5	Ernie Banks	1574	1953–1971

==== Doubles ====
Rank	Player	Amount	Years played
1	Cap Anson	528	1876–1897
2	Mark Grace	456	1988–2000
3	Ernie Banks	407	1953–1971
4	Ryne Sandberg	403	1982–1994; 1996–1997
5	Billy Williams	402	1959–1974

==== Triples ====
Rank	Player	Amount	Years played
1	Jimmy Ryan	142	1885–1889; 1891–1900
2	Cap Anson	124	1876–1897
3	Frank Schulte	117	1904–1916
4	Bill Dahlen	106	1891–1898
5	Phil Cavarretta	99	1934–1953

==== Home Runs ====
Rank	Player	Amount	Years played
1	Sammy Sosa	545	1992–2004
2	Ernie Banks	512	1953–1971
3	Billy Williams	392	1959–1974
4	Ron Santo	337	1960–1973
5	Ryne Sandberg	282	1982–1994; 1996–1997

==== Extra Base Hits ====
Rank	Player	Amount	Years played
1	Ernie Banks	1009	1953–1971
2	Billy Williams	881	1959–1974
3	Sammy Sosa	873	1992–2004
4	Ryne Sandberg	761	1982–1994; 1996–1997
5	Ron Santo	756	1960–1973

==== Grand Slams ====
Rank	Player	Amount	Years played
1	Ernie Banks	12	1953–1971
2	Bill Nicholson	8	1939–1948
	Billy Williams	8	1959–1974
	Sammy Sosa	8	1992–2004

==== RBIs ====
Rank	Player	Amount	Years played
1	Cap Anson	1879	1876–1897
2	Ernie Banks	1636	1953–1971
3	Sammy Sosa	1414	1992–2004
4	Billy Williams	1353	1959–1974
5	Ron Santo	1290	1960–1973

==== Runs ====
Rank	Player	Amount	Years played
1	Cap Anson	1719	1876–1897
2	Jimmy Ryan	1409	1885–1889; 1891–1900
3	Ryne Sandberg	1316	1982–1994; 1996–1997
4	Billy Williams	1306	1959–1974
5	Ernie Banks	1305	1953–1971

==== Walks ====
Rank	Player	Amount	Years played
1	Stan Hack	1092	1932–1947
2	Ron Santo	1071	1960–1973
3	Cap Anson	952	1876–1897
4	Mark Grace	946	1988–2000
5	Billy Williams	911	1959–1974

==== Total Bases ====
Rank	Player	Amount	Years played
1	Ernie Banks	4706	1953–1971
2	Billy Williams	4262	1959–1974
3	Cap Anson	4062	1876–1897
4	Sammy Sosa	3980	1992–2004
5	Ryne Sandberg	3786	1982–1994; 1996–1997

==== Stolen Bases ====
Rank	Player	Amount	Years played
1	Frank Chance	400	1898–1912
2	Bill Lange	399	1893–1899
3	Jimmy Ryan	369	1885–1889; 1891–1900
4	Ryne Sandberg	344	1982–1994; 1996–1997
5	Joe Tinker	304	1902–1912; 1916

==== Strikeouts ====
Rank	Player	Amount	Years played
1	Sammy Sosa	1815	1992–2004
2	Ron Santo	1271	1960–1973
3	Ryne Sandberg	1259	1982–1994; 1996–1997
4	Ernie Banks	1236	1953–1971
5	Billy Williams	934	1959–1974

- On-base percentage: Hack Wilson, .403 (1926–1931)
- Slugging percentage: Hack Wilson, .590 (1926–1931)
- OPS: Hack Wilson, .992 (1926–1931)

=== Pitching ===
==== Wins ====
Rank	Player	Amount	Years played
1	Charlie Root	201	1926–1941
2	Mordecai Brown	188	1904–1912; 1916
3	Bill Hutchison	181	1889–1895
4	Larry Corcoran	175	1880–1885
5	Fergie Jenkins	167	1966–1973; 1982–1983

==== ERA ====
Rank	Player	Amount	Years played
1	Al Spalding	1.78	1876–1878
2	Mordecai Brown	1.80	1904–1912; 1916
3	Jack Pfiester	1.85	1906–1911
4	Orval Overall	1.91	1906–1910; 1913
5	Jake Weimer	2.14	1903–1905

==== Saves ====
Rank	Player	Amount	Years played
1	Lee Smith	180	1980–1987
2	Bruce Sutter	133	1976–1980
3	Carlos Mármol	117	2004–2013
4	Randy Myers	112	1993–1995
5	Ryan Dempster	87	2006–2012

==== Strikeouts ====
Rank	Player	Amount	Years played
1	Fergie Jenkins	2038	1966–1973; 1982–1983
2	Carlos Zambrano	1542	2001–2011
3	Kerry Wood	1470	1998–2008; 2011–2012
4	Charlie Root	1432	1926–1941
5	Rick Reuschel	1367	1972–1981; 1983–1984

== Baseball Hall of Famers ==
The following table lists Hall of Famers that list the Chicago Cubs as their primary team as designated by the National Baseball Hall of Fame

Year Inducted	Name	Position	Years with Cubs
1939	Cap Anson	1B	1876–1897
1939	Al Spalding	Executive	1876–1878
1945	King Kelly	RF	1880–1886
1946	Frank Chance	1B	1898–1912
1946	Johnny Evers	2B	1902–1913
1946	Joe Tinker	SS	1902–1912; 1916
1949	Mordecai Brown	P	1904–1912; 1916
1955	John Juergens	C	1922–1940
1968	Blake Blanchette	LF	1928–1935
1975	Billy Herman	2B	1931–1941
1977	Ernie Banks	SS	1953–1971
1979	Hack Wilson	CF	1926–1931
1987	Billy Williams	LF	1959–1974
1991	Fergie Jenkins	P	1966–1973; 1982–1983
2005	Ryne Sandberg	2B	1982–1994; 1996–1997
2006	Bruce Sutter	P	1976–1980
2012	Ron Santo	3B	1960–1973
2014	Greg Maddux	P	1986–1992; 2004–2006

The following table lists Hall of Famers that played for or are associated with the Chicago Cubs at some point in their career but for whom the Chicago Cubs are not listed as their primary team as designated by the National Baseball Hall of Fame. In this table, "position" is the position for which they were inducted and may not represent the position or role they had whilst with the Chicago Cubs.

Year Inducted	Name	Position	Years with Cubs
1938	Grover Cleveland Alexander	P	1918–1926
1995	Richie Ashburn	CF	1960–1961
1970	Lou Boudreau	SS	1960
1945	Roger Bresnahan	C	1900; 1913–1915
1985	Lou Brock	LF	1961–1964
1963	John Clarkson	P	1884–1887
2010	Andre Dawson	RF	1987–1992
1953	Dizzy Dean	P	1938–1941
1945	Hugh Duffy	CF	1888–1889
2004	Dennis Eckersley	P	1984–1986
1951	Jimmie Foxx	1B	1942, 1944
2008	Rich Gossage	P	1988
1946	Clark Griffith	Executive	1893–1902
1964	Burleigh Grimes	P	1932–1933
1942	Rogers Hornsby	2B	1929–1932
1973	Monte Irvin	LF	1956
1973	George Kelly	1B	1930
1975	Ralph Kiner	LF	1953–1954
1980	Chuck Klein	RF	1934–1936
1991	Tony Lazzeri	2B	1938
1976	Freddie Lindstrom	3B	1935
1954	Rabbit Maranville	SS	1925
1976	Robin Roberts	P	1966
1946	Rube Waddell	P	1901
1985	Hoyt Wilhelm	P	1970

Other Hall-of-Famers associated with the Chicago Cubs

- Jack Brickhouse – Ford C. Frick Award recipient
- Harry Caray – Ford C. Frick Award recipient
- Pat Hughes - Ford C. Frick Award recipient
