= Cap Anson =

American baseball player (1852–1922)

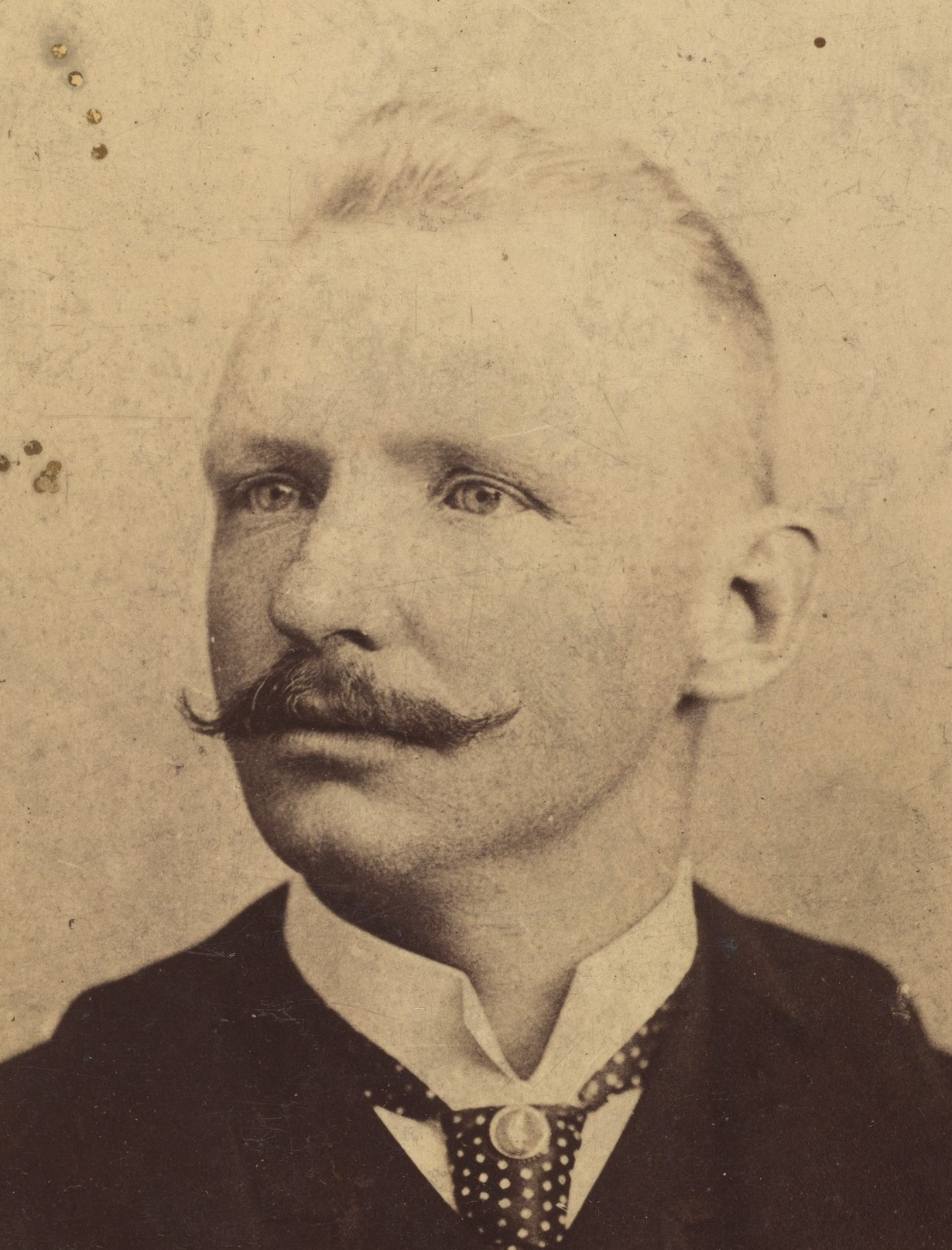
- First baseman / Manager
- Born: April 17, 1852; Marshalltown, Iowa, U.S.
- Died: April 14, 1922 (aged 69); Chicago, Illinois, U.S.
- Batted: Right Threw: Right

Major-league debut
- May 6, 1871, for the Rockford Forest Citys

Last major-league appearance
- October 3, 1897, for the Chicago Colts

Major-league statistics
- Batting average: .334
- Hits: 3,435
- Home runs: 97
- Runs batted in: 2,075
- Managerial record: 1,295–947
- Winning %: .578
- Stats at Baseball Reference
- Managerial record at Baseball Reference

Teams
- As player: Rockford Forest Citys (1871); Philadelphia Athletics (1872–1875); Chicago White Stockings / Colts (1876–1897); As manager: Philadelphia Athletics (1875); Chicago White Stockings / Colts (1879–1897); New York Giants (1898)

Career highlights and awards
- 2× NL batting champion (1881, 1888); 8× NL RBI leader (1880–1882, 1884–1886, 1888, 1891)

Member of the National

Baseball Hall of Fame
- Induction: 1939
- Election method: Old-Timers Committee
City Clerk of Chicago
In office 1905–1907
Preceded by	Fred C. Bender
Succeeded by	John R. McCabe

Adrian Constantine Anson (April 17, 1852 – April 14, 1922), nicknamed "Cap", "Pop", and, early in his career, "Baby" and "The Marshalltown Infant", was an American professional baseball player who played a record 27 consecutive major-league seasons. Anson was regarded as one of the greatest players of his era and one of the first superstars of the game. He spent most of his career with the National League's Chicago franchise, serving as the club's manager, first baseman and, later in his tenure, minority owner. He led the team to six pennants from 1876 to 1886. Anson was one of baseball's first great hitters, and probably the first to tally over 3,000 career hits. In addition to being a star player, he innovated managerial tactics such as signals between players and the rotation of pitchers.

Anson played a role in establishing the racial segregation in professional baseball that persisted until the late 1940s. On several occasions, Anson refused to take the field when the opposing roster included black players. His demands may have been cited as representative of player attitudes by team owners of the International League when they voted on July 14, 1887 to ban the signing of new contracts with black players.

After retiring as a player, Anson briefly managed the New York Giants. He ran several enterprises in Chicago, including opening a billiards and bowling hall and running a semi-professional baseball team he dubbed "Anson's Colts". Anson also toured extensively on the vaudeville circuit, performing monologues and songs. Many of his business ventures failed. As a result, Anson lost his ownership stake in the Chicago franchise and filed for bankruptcy. In 1939, Anson was inducted into the National Baseball Hall of Fame.

== Early life ==
Anson was born in Marshalltown, Iowa. Beginning in 1866, he spent two years at the high-school age boarding school of the University of Notre Dame after being sent there by his father in hopes of curtailing his mischievousness. His time away did little to discipline him. Soon after he returned home, his father sent him to the University of Iowa, where his bad behavior resulted in the school asking him to leave after one semester.

== Professional career ==
=== National Association ===
Anson played on a number of competitive baseball clubs in his youth, and in 1871 began to play professionally for the Rockford Forest Citys in the National Association, primarily as a third baseman. While playing there, he gained the nickname "The Marshalltown Infant", because of his youth. He was a large and powerful man, standing 6 ft 2 in (1.88 m) tall and weighing about 220 pounds (100 kg).

When the Rockford club folded at the end of the 1871 season, Anson signed with the Philadelphia Athletics. In 1872 and 1873, Anson finished in the league's top five in batting average, on-base percentage (OBP), and on-base plus slugging (OPS). His numbers declined slightly in 1874 and 1875, but he was still good enough that Chicago White Stockings secretary-turned-president William Hulbert sought him to improve his club for the 1876 season. Hulbert broke league rules by negotiating with Anson and several other stars while the 1875 season was still in progress, and ultimately founded the new National League to forestall any disciplinary action.

Anson, who had become engaged to a Philadelphia native in the meantime, had second thoughts about going west, but Hulbert held Anson to his contract and he eventually warmed to the Windy City.

=== Chicago White Stockings/Colts ===
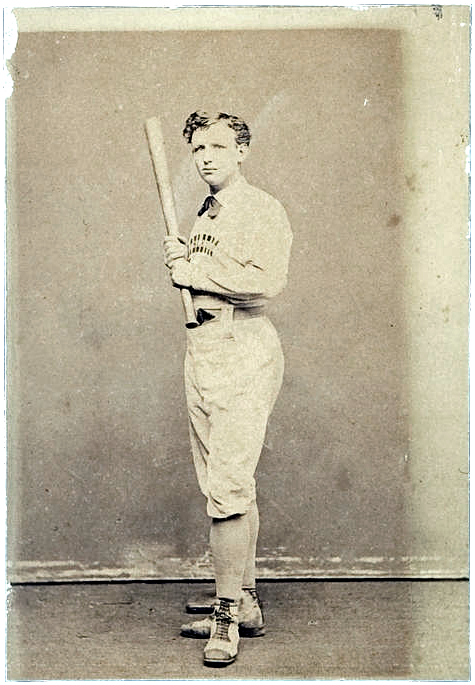
Anson with Philadelphia in 1874

The White Stockings won the first league title, but fell off the pace the following two seasons. During this time, Anson was a solid hitter, but not quite a superstar. Both his fortunes and those of his team would change after Anson was named captain-manager of the club in 1879.

His new role led to the nickname "Cap", though newspapers typically called him by the more formal "Captain Anson" or "Capt. Anson". Led by Anson, who now primarily played first base, the White Stockings won five pennants between 1880 and 1886. They were helped to the titles by new managerial tactics, including the use of a third-base coach, having one fielder back up another, signaling batters, and the rotation of two star pitchers. In the first half of the 1880s, aided by speedy players like Mike Kelly, Anson had his players aggressively run the bases, forcing the opposition into making errors. After the expression first became popular in the 1890s, he retroactively claimed to use some of the first "hit and run" plays.

Anson shares credit as an innovator of modern spring training along with the president of the Chicago club, Albert Spalding. They were among the first to send their clubs to warmer climates in the South to prepare for the season, beginning in Hot Springs, Arkansas, in 1886. On the field, Anson was the team's best hitter and run producer. In the 1880s, he won two batting titles (1881, 1888) and finished second four times (1880, 1882, 1886–1887). During the same period, he led the league in runs batted in (RBIs) seven times (1880–82, 1884–86, 1888). His best season was in 1881, when he led the league in batting (.399), OBP (.442), OPS (.952), hits (137), total bases (175), and RBIs (82). He also became the first player to hit three consecutive home runs, five homers in two games, and four doubles in a game, as well as being the first to perform two unassisted double plays in a game. He is one of only a few players to score six runs in a game, a feat he accomplished on August 24, 1886.

Anson signed a ten-year contract in 1888 to manage the White Stockings (which, because of a typographical error he failed to spot, ended after the 1897 season instead of 1898), but his best years were behind him. He led the league in walks in 1890 and garnered his eighth and final RBI crown in 1891. On the managerial front, he failed to win another pennant.

As the end of the 1880s approached, the club had begun trading away its stars in favor of young players, with the exception of the veteran Anson. Local newspapers had started to call the team "Anson's Colts", or just "Colts", before the decade was out. With the advent of the Players' League in 1890, what little talent the club still had was drained away, and the team nickname "Colts", though never official, became standard usage in the local media along with variants such as (Anson's) White Colts and (Anson's) Broncos.

He also mellowed enough that he became a fatherly figure and was often called "Pop". When he was fired as manager after the 1897 season, it also marked the end of his 27-year playing career. The following season, newspapers dubbed the Colts the "Orphans", as they had lost their "Pop".

=== Racism ===
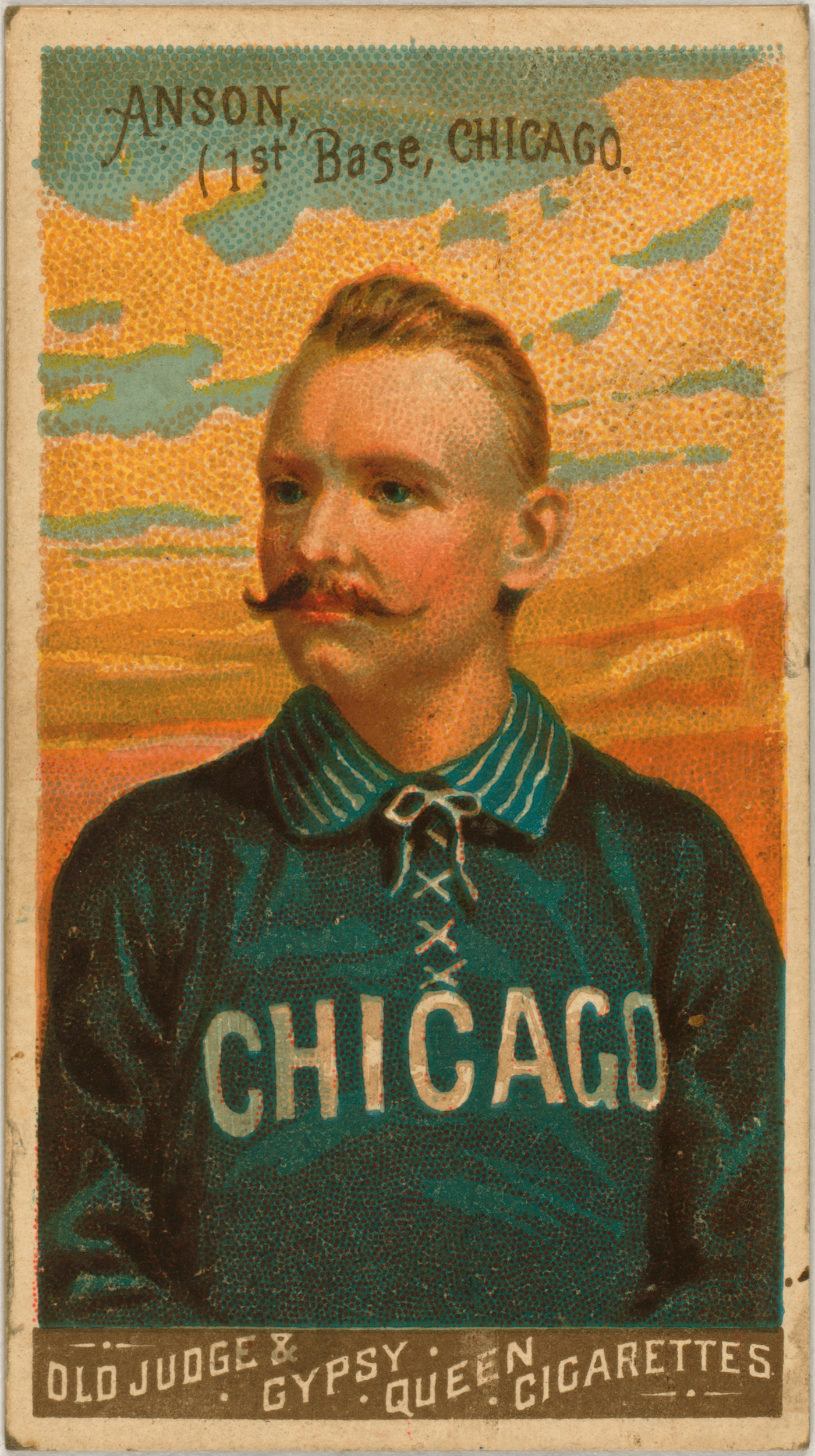
Cap Anson baseball card (N162), 1888

Although the decision to ban black players from the National League and the International League was made behind the scenes by team owners, Anson was the most outspoken player and vociferously insisted on segregation even before the ban was official. As a star player and team manager, his influence was substantial. Baseball historian Kevin Blackistone opined that "I don’t think anyone has had a greater impact on baseball than Anson" for his role in baseball's racist discrimination. While not disputing the specific impacts of Anson's direct actions, baseball historian Bill James felt that this viewpoint overstated Anson's influence; he speculated that it is "enormously likely that Jim Crow would have come to baseball even had Cap Anson never been born."

On August 10, 1883, Anson refused to play an exhibition game against the Toledo Blue Stockings because their catcher, Moses Fleetwood Walker, was black. When Blue Stockings Manager Charlie Morton told Anson the White Stockings would forfeit the gate receipts if they refused to play, Anson backed down, but not before uttering the word nigger on the field and vowing that his team would not play in such a game again.

In 1884, Chicago again played an exhibition game at Toledo, which was then in the American Association, a major league. Walker sat it out, however, it is uncertain whether he did so to placate Chicago or due to injury; Jimmy McGuire instead did the catching. Both had sore hands, the Toledo Blade had said a few days earlier. Of the two catchers, Walker was seemingly the more injured, as he did not play in Toledo's second-most recent game. Among Anson's incidents, this one is unique in that private correspondence provides insight. Three months before the game, Chicago Treasurer-Secretary John A. Brown wrote Toledo manager Charlie Morton that "the management of the Chicago Ball Club have no personal feeling about the matter," while "the players do most decisively object and to preserve harmony in the club it is necessary that I have your assurance in writing that [Walker] will not play any position in your nine July 25. I have no doubt such is your meaning[;] only your letter does not express in full. I have no desire to replay the occurrence of last season and must have your guarantee to that effort."

Walker and his brother Welday were released from Toledo later that year. On July 14, 1887, the Chicago White Stockings played an exhibition game against the Newark Little Giants. African American George Stovey was listed in the Newark News as the scheduled Newark starting pitcher. Anson objected, and Stovey did not pitch. Moreover, International League owners had voted 6-to-4 at a 10 a.m. to 1 p.m. meeting in Buffalo on the morning of the game to exclude African-American players from future contracts.

=== Personal character ===
Studio photo of Anson

Anson was authoritarian as a manager, marching his players onto the field in military formation and banning alcohol consumption during the playing season. Starting in the latter 1880s, he often bet on baseball, mainly on his team's chances to win the pennant. However, in that era, the main concern was players taking bribes to purposely lose games. Betting by players, managers, and owners was regarded as acceptable so long as they did not bet against their team doing well or associate with gamblers.

On corruption in sports, he said the following in 1891: "The time may have been, and probably was, when base-ball was as rotten as horse racing, but that time has gone by. The men in control of base-ball matters are of the highest personal character, and no one will say anything against them. As to the charges against any individual player, I will believe them when they have been proved. Every thing [sic] possible has been done to protect the patrons of the National game, and efforts in that direction will never be abated. I don’t know of any crookedness in the ball field. If I did I’d undoubtedly say something about it."

A chronological review of 162 reports of bets on regular season baseball by players, managers or club officials, from 1876 to 1900, tallied the sport's top bettors in that era as follows:

- 1. Anson (57), Chicago's captain-manager; Hall of Famer
- 2. (tie) Jim Mutrie (9), mainly as manager of the New York Giants, and his bets were mostly with Anson
- 2. Edward Talcott (9), millionaire stockbroker as treasurer of the New York Giants
- 4. (tie) King Kelly (7), mainly as Boston's captain; Hall of Famer
- 4. Frank Robison (7), Cleveland Spiders owner

=== Albert Spalding and James Hart ===
Anson first met Albert Spalding while both were players; Spalding was a pitcher for the Rockford Forest Citys, Anson played for the Marshalltown, Iowa, team. Spalding convinced the 18-year-old Anson to come play for the Forest Citys at a salary of $65 per month. In 1876, when Anson was playing for Philadelphia, Spalding and William Hulbert lured Anson to the Chicago team, which Spalding now managed. After signing the contract, Anson had second thoughts (his future wife did not want to leave her family in Philadelphia), and offered Spalding $1,000 to void the contract. Spalding held Anson to the contract, and Anson came to Chicago in March 1876.

Spalding retired as a player and manager after the 1877 season, but continued as secretary, and later president, of the White Stockings. Anson became a player/manager of the team in 1879, and by 1889 had a 13% ownership. In 1888 Spalding announced that the White Stockings, including Anson, and a "picked nine" from the rest of the National League would begin a World Tour after the end of the season. Spalding put up most of the money, but Anson invested $3,750 of his own. James Hart was hired as business manager and Anson developed an intense dislike for him.

After Spalding stepped down as president of the Chicago club in 1891, he appointed James Hart to the position, which Anson felt should have been his despite his dismal business record. Spalding, however, continued to run the club behind the scenes. In December 1892, Hart, with Spalding's blessing, reorganized the White Stockings into a stock company. Anson was required to sign a new contract, which ended in 1898 instead of 1899 as the previous one had. Anson spotted the error later but said nothing, trusting that Spalding would honor the previous terms.

Hart began to undermine Anson's managerial decisions by reversing fines and suspensions imposed by Anson. By 1897 Anson had little control over his players; after Anson demanded a sportswriter print that Anson thought "the Chicago ball club is composed of drunkards and loafers who are throwing him down", his days as manager were numbered. Spalding invited Anson and his wife on a four-week journey to England in late November 1897. Spalding dropped many hints on the voyage, encouraging Anson to voluntarily retire, but Anson had no intention of doing so. Things remained in limbo until January 29, 1898 when the Associated Press printed a statement by Spalding: "I have taken pains as a mediator to find out from Chicagoans how they feel about a change of management. There has been a decided undercurrent in favor... Lovers of baseball think that Anson has been in power too long."

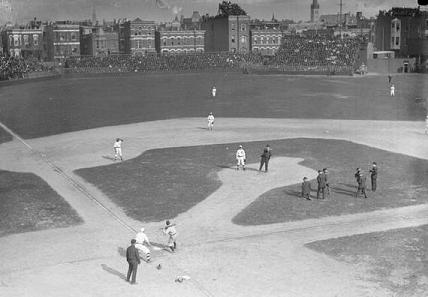
Cap Anson throws out the first pitch for the home opener for the Cubs on April 22, 1908, at Chicago's West Side Park.

=== Career hits total ===
There has been some controversy as to whether Anson should be considered the first player to reach the 3,000 hit milestone. For many years, official statistics credited him with achieving that goal. When the first edition of Macmillan's Baseball Encyclopedia was published in 1969, it disregarded a rule which was in place only for the 1887 season that counted walks as hits. Anson's 60 walks in 1887 were removed from his hit total, lowering his career mark to 2,995 hits. Later editions of the encyclopedia added five more hits to bring his total to 3,000.

The other controversy over Anson's total hits had to do with his five years in the National Association. Neither the Macmillan Encyclopedia editions nor a 1969 special baseball rules committee recognized the National Association as being a major league. MLB.com does not count Anson's time in the National Association in his statistics, but tallies his National League total as 3,011 hits. This places Anson 30th on MLB.com's all-time list.

Other sources credit Anson with a different number of hits, largely because scoring and record keeping was haphazard in baseball until well into the 20th century.

Beginning with the publication of the Baseball Encyclopedia, statisticians have continually found errors and have adjusted career totals accordingly. According to the Sporting News baseball record book, which does not take National Association statistics into account, Anson had 3,012 hits over his career. Baseball Reference also credits Anson with 3,012 hits during his National League career; including his time in the NA, Anson is credited with 3,435 hits. The National Baseball Hall of Fame, which uses statistics verified by the Elias Sports Bureau, credits Anson with 3,081 hits. This figure disregards games played in the NA, but includes the walks earned during 1887 as hits.

== Retirement ==
Anson briefly made a return to baseball managing the New York Giants in June and July 1898. He then attempted to buy a Chicago team in the Western League, but failed after being opposed by Spalding. In 1900, he helped to organize a new version of the defunct American Association, called the New American Base Ball Association, and was named its president. However, at the first sign of trouble he dissolved the league before a single game was played, drawing heated criticism from other backers.

Anson's few successful ventures included a combination billiards hall and a bowling alley he opened in downtown Chicago in 1899. Anson was named vice-president of the American Bowling Congress in 1903, and led a team to the five-man national championship in 1904. Anson was forced to sell the billiards hall in 1909 when faced with mounting financial problems that led to his bankruptcy. Anson was also an avid golfer.

Anson's 1900 book A Ball Player's Career: Being the Personal Reminiscences of Adrian C. Anson, was ghostwritten by Chicago horse racing writer and poet Richard Cary Jr., who had the pen name of Hyder Ali. Right after it was published, Cary told the St. Louis Post-Dispatch, "I really thought when I started that the ‘Cap’ [sic] would be able to reel off the story of his life about as fast as a nimble man would care to write it. It took me just two days to find that was not the case. A day and a half to get the ‘Cap’ to sit down and the other half day in egging him on. The story had to be literally dragged out of him. The incidents of his baseball career were apparently fresh in his mind, but when it came to actual dates he was all at sea. When he did give a date nine times out of ten it was wrong and had to be corrected later on." The New York Times said whether Anson "wrote every word in this volume of reminiscences or not, the book reads characteristically. The expression is Ansonian."

After a number of failed business attempts, including a handball arena and bottled ginger beer that exploded on store shelves, he was later elected city clerk of Chicago in 1905. Despite the traction issue being the predominant issue of the day in the city's politics, Anson instead centered his campaign on the nativist and racist assertion that "race suicide" was occurring with demographic shifts in the United States due to an increased number of Catholic immigrants from places such as Ireland and Italy. As a candidate, Anson benefited from strong name recognition owing to his sports celebrity. During his tenure, one of Anson's billiards hall generated controversy for Anson's failure to pay license fees on pool tables. Anson would appear before the Chicago City Council to unsuccessfully lobby them to reduce such fees. After serving one term as city clerk, he failed in the Democratic primary to become Cook County sheriff in 1907.

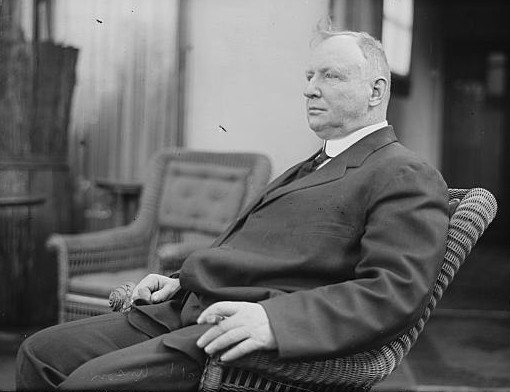
Anson in 1907

In 1907, Anson made another attempt to come back to baseball, acquiring a semi-pro team in the Chicago City League, which he would call "Anson's Colts". Anson initially had no intention of playing for the team, but in June 1907, at the age of 55, Anson started playing some games at first base in an attempt to boost poor attendance. Despite the draw of seeing Anson play, the team did not attract much attendance, and lost money for Anson. In the fall of 1908, Anson assembled a semi-pro football team, also called Anson's Colts. Although the football team won the city championship, they were not a financial success.

Anson began acting during his baseball career. In 1888, he made his stage debut with a single appearance in Hoyt's play A Parlor Match at the Theatre Comique in Harlem. He also played himself in an 1895 Broadway play called The Runaway Colt, written to take advantage of his fame. Later, Anson began touring on the vaudeville circuit, a common practice for athletes of the time, which lasted up until about a year before his death.

He first appeared in vaudeville in 1913 doing a monologue and a short dance. In 1914, George M. Cohan wrote a monologue for him, and in 1917, Cohan, with Chicago Tribune sportswriter Ring Lardner wrote another piece for him, titled First Aid for Father. Anson appeared with two of his grown daughters, Adele and Dorothy, and would bat papier-mâché baseballs made by Albert Spalding into the audience. He appeared in 1921 accompanied by his two daughters in an act written by Ring Lardner with songs by Herman Timberg.

Anson retired from vaudeville in 1921, and continued to refuse a pension from the National League, despite having no other income. In April 1922, he became the general manager of a new golf club in the South Side of Chicago.

== Death ==
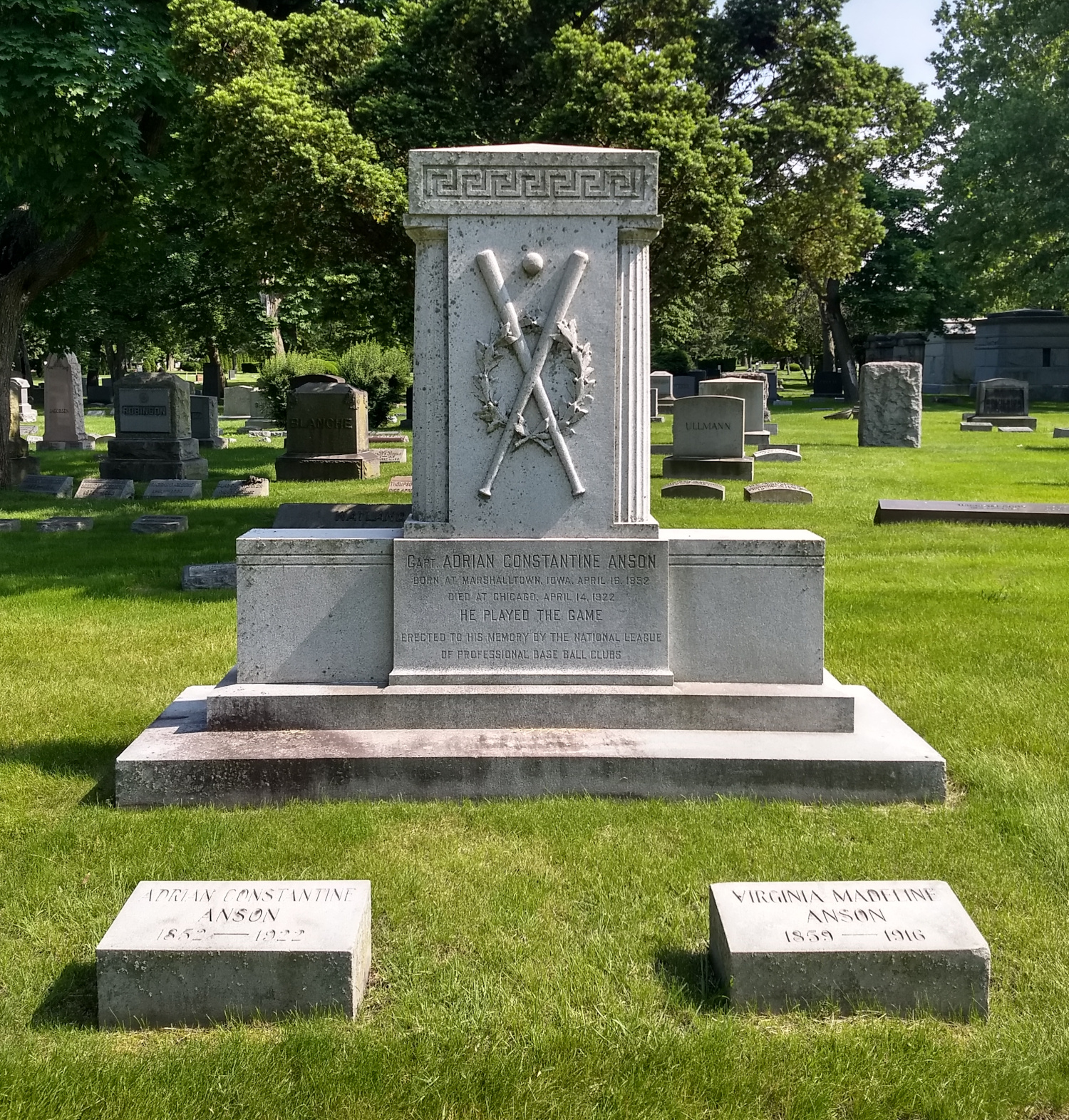
Anson's grave at Oak Woods Cemetery

Anson died from a glandular ailment on April 14, 1922, three days shy of his 70th birthday. He was interred at Oak Woods Cemetery in Chicago.

== Legacy ==
Anson was inducted into the Baseball Hall of Fame in 1939, one of the first 19th century players selected. Over 100 years after his retirement, he still holds several Cubs franchise records, including most career runs batted in, runs, hits, singles, and doubles. Defensively, he also holds the franchise record for putouts, but also is second in franchise history for errors. Anson still holds the major-league record for most seasons played (27), although Nolan Ryan equaled it in 1993.

Anson won 1,282 games with Chicago as a manager and remains the franchise's all-time leader in wins. He was the second manager to reach 1,000 wins, after Harry Wright. Just 24 other major-league managers have won 1,000 games with one team.

In a 1992 episode of The Simpsons, "Homer at the Bat", Anson was suggested by Mr. Burns as one of the ringers for his softball team, before being informed that he was long since deceased.

== Personal life ==
In 1872, the 20-year-old Anson met 13-year-old Virginia Fiegel, the daughter of a Philadelphia bar and restaurant owner. The couple got married on November 21, 1876; the marriage lasted until her death in 1916. For the first seven years of their marriage, the couple lived in Chicago during the baseball season and Philadelphia during the off-season, but eventually moved to Chicago on a year-round basis.

The Ansons had seven children, three of whom died in infancy. Daughter Grace was born in October 1877; son Adrian Hulbert was born in 1882 and died four days later; daughter Adele was born in April 1884; son Adrian Constantine, Jr. was born in 1887 and died four months later; daughter Dorothy was born in 1889; son John Henry was born in 1892 and died four days later; and daughter Virginia Jeanette was born in 1899.

== See also ==
- List of Major League Baseball individual streaks
- List of Major League Baseball hit records
- List of Major League Baseball RBI records
- List of Major League Baseball doubles records
- List of Major League Baseball career hits leaders
- List of Major League Baseball career doubles leaders
- List of Major League Baseball career triples leaders
- List of Major League Baseball career runs scored leaders
- List of Major League Baseball career runs batted in leaders
- List of Major League Baseball career total bases leaders
- List of Major League Baseball career stolen bases leaders
- List of Major League Baseball annual runs batted in leaders
- List of Major League Baseball batting champions
- List of Major League Baseball annual doubles leaders
- Major League Baseball titles leaders
- List of Major League Baseball player-managers
- List of Major League Baseball managerial wins and winning percentage leaders
