= Bill Lange =

American baseball player (1871–1950)

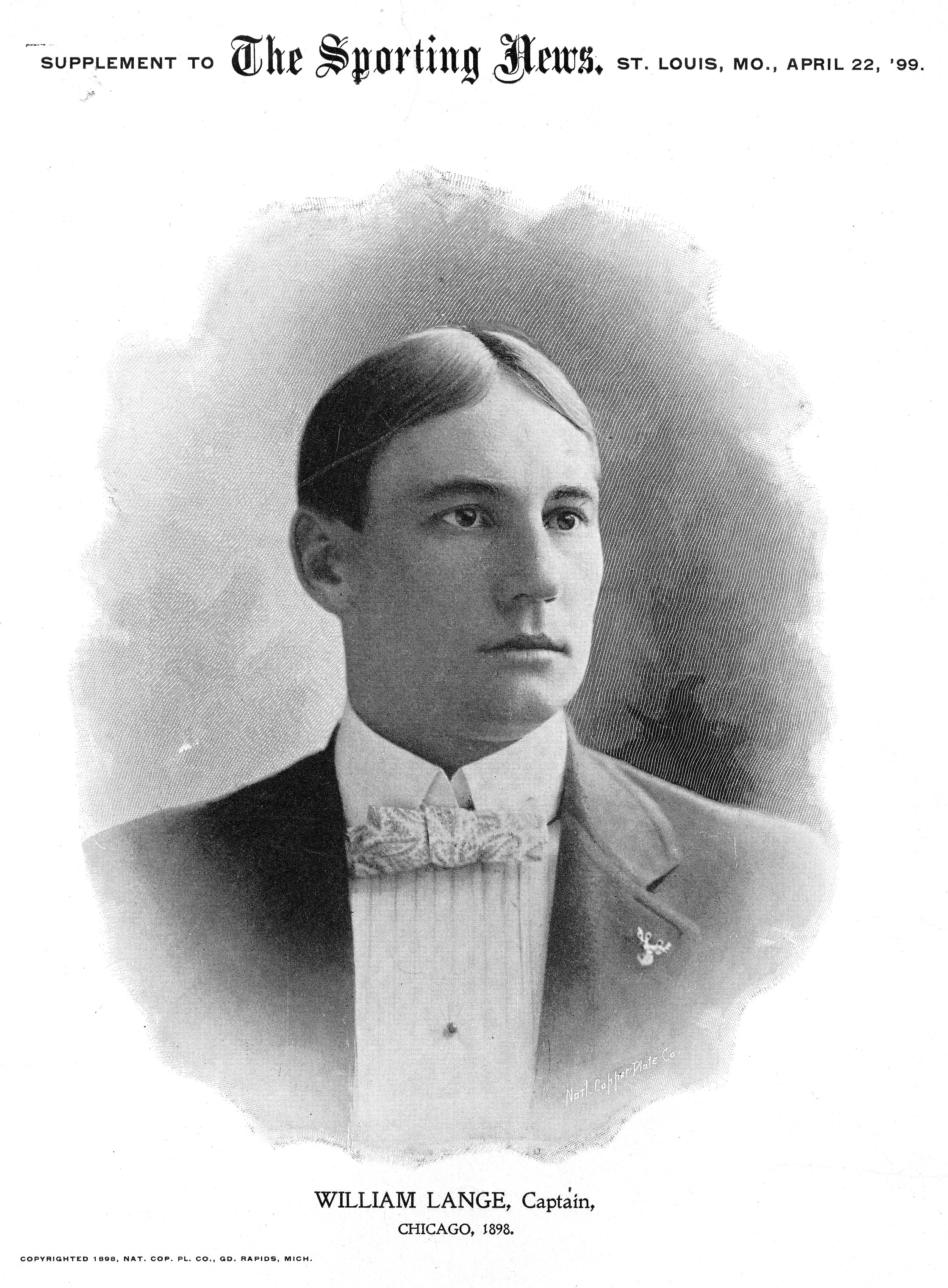
- Center fielder
- Born: June 6, 1871; San Francisco, California, U.S.
- Died: July 23, 1950 (aged 79); San Francisco, California, U.S.
- Batted: Right Threw: Right

MLB debut
- April 27, 1893, for the Chicago Colts

Last MLB appearance
- October 15, 1899, for the Chicago Orphans

MLB statistics
- Batting average: .330
- Runs batted in: 579
- Stolen bases: 400
- Stats at Baseball Reference

Teams
- Chicago Colts/Orphans (1893–1899)

Career highlights and awards
- NL stolen base leader (1897); Chicago Cubs Hall of Fame

William Alexander Lange (/ˈlæŋ/; June 6, 1871 – July 23, 1950), also known as "Little Eva", was an American Major League Baseball center fielder, who played his entire seven-year career for the Chicago Colts and Orphans from 1893 to 1899. During his time in the Majors, he once led the National League in stolen bases, and was among the seasonal leaders in several other offensive categories including home runs, and batting average.

Lange was noted for having a combination of great speed and power, especially for his size. His 6-foot-1-inch (1.85 m), 190-pound (86 kg) frame was considered large for his era. He is best known for retiring from baseball during the prime of his career to get married, as his future father-in-law forbade his daughter to marry a baseball player. Despite the short-lived marriage, he refused all offers to return as a player.

He became a successful businessman after his retirement from baseball. In addition to his success in real estate and insurance, he became a leading figure in Major League Baseball's efforts to generate interest in the game worldwide. He was enlisted by the leading baseball figures of the day to assist in establishing leagues in several European countries, that could eventually compete against American teams, while also scouting for undiscovered talent.

== Early life ==
Born in the Presidio District of San Francisco, California, he ran away from home while still in grammar school to live with his brother in Port Townsend, Washington. It was from there that he moved up to play Minor League Baseball for the Seattle Reds of the Northwestern Baseball League in the early 1890s. When the Northwestern League folded, Lange return the Bay area to play for the Oakland Colonels of the California League. He played one season for the Colonels, then was signed by the Chicago Colts of the National League.

== Major League career ==
Lange made his Major League debut on April 27, 1893 for the Colts, and enjoyed a successful inaugural Major League season. He scored 92 times, hit eight home runs, had 88 runs batted in (RBIs), while also finishing seventh in stolen bases with 47, and batted .281. This was the only time he batted under .300 during his Major League career. In the field that season, he played at second base, in right field and center field. He did not start playing center field exclusively until the following season. Lange continued his success in 1894 by raising his batting average to .328 and finishing fifth in the league with 65 stolen bases.

Lange achieved his highest league rankings in 1895. His .389 batting average was fifth in the league and is still the top individual season average in Chicago Cubs history. He also finished second in the league in stolen bases with 67, fifth in home runs with 10, fifth in on-base percentage with .456, hit 16 triples, scored 120 runs, and batted in 98 RBIs.

Lange had several notable moments during the 1896 season. On July 4, he stole five bases in one game against the Louisville Colonels, although it was two stolen bases short of the record of seven set by George Gore and Billy Hamilton. During a game on August 31, he entered baseball lore with a feat that he never actually performed. The game was scoreless in the bottom of the 10th inning when Lange made a diving catch in center field to keep the game scoreless. Later in the inning, Chicago's first baseman, George Decker attempted to field a thrown ball from third baseman Barry McCormick, but it bounced off and broke his wrist instead. In an effort to get Decker to the hospital adjacent the ballpark, his teammates knocked down several wooden slats of the outfield fence to expedite his journey. However, the two events were confused and it became legend that Lange had crashed through the fence making that acrobatic catch in tenth. Lange finished the season with a .326 batting average, while also stealing 84 bases, second in the league, and finished eighth in league with 16 triples.

His success continued into the 1897 season, as he batted .340, scored 119 runs, and led the league in stolen bases for the only time in his career. His production dropped his last two seasons in the Majors as his runs scored fell to 79 in 1898 and 81 in 1899, although he still kept his batting averages of .319 and .325 respectively.

While he was very popular, his career as a baseball player was not without controversy. He was ejected from a game on at least two occasions, one of which occurred on May 23, 1897 when he had an on-field fight with Washington Senators second baseman John O'Brien. On September 16, 1899, in a game against the Brooklyn Superbas, umpire Ed Swartwood called the game because of darkness with Brooklyn up by two runs. Lange, and other Chicago player surrounded Swartwood and proceeded to "knock him around", with Lange notably "tweaking" the umpire's ear.

== Retirement ==
Lange finished his career on October 15, 1899, having announced a few days earlier his intention to retire after the season. His team played a doubleheader that day, winning 7–0 against the St. Louis Perfectos, then losing to the Louisville Colonels later that day in a game shortened by darkness.

He retired from the game at age 28, during the prime of his career, so he could marry a woman whose father forbade her to marry a baseball player. In the eyes of the 19th century public, baseball players were popular, but were often looked upon as low class. Lange's future wife was from his hometown of San Francisco, and her family was very well-to-do. Also, with the prospect of entering into the world of real estate and insurance, he could make much more money than he did as a ball player. Though the marriage ended in a divorce a short time later, he would not take any offers to return to Major League Baseball, despite Chicago's salary offer of $3,500 that would have made him the highest paid player in the league. Although his career lasted only seven years, he finished as the decade leader among 1890s Chicago players in batting average, on-base percentage, slugging percentage, and stolen bases.

In 813 games over seven seasons, Lange posted a .330 batting average (1056-for-3202) with 691 runs, 39 home runs, 579 RBI, 400 stolen bases and 350 bases on balls. He finished his career with a .932 fielding percentage.

== Post-career ==
Lange became successful in both real estate and insurance in his hometown of San Francisco after he retired from baseball. Lange is also credited in several sources, as being the person who discovered future Chicago Cubs first baseman, manager, and Hall of Famer, Frank Chance, after having watched him play for the local Fresno, California team during the off-season of 1897. Lange had recommended Chance to the team owner, Jim Hart, but Hart disputed this claim, saying that Henry Harris had recommended Chance to him while Harris was an owner of a San Francisco team in the fall of 1897.

In 1907, the California State League, a minor league, was declared by organized baseball to be an "outlaw" league. Organized baseball accused the league of harboring players from the Majors Leagues who had violated the reserve clause to join a number of their teams. The league had become a rival to the already established Pacific Coast League (PCL), who, after being an "outlaw" league themselves, had signed the National Agreement with organized baseball, agreeing that they would not harbor blacklisted or banned players from the Major Leagues. The National Commission decided that the best way to deal with this situation was to dissolve this outlaw league. They did this by lifting the blacklist on any player already in the State League, which would create competition among all known leagues, for these players. This commission enlisted Lange, who used his influence with the sports editors in the local area to speed up the process. The attempt worked as the PCL successfully lured the Sacramento, California team into joining their league, with many of the players soon to follow.

Later, John McGraw of the New York Giants enlisted Lange as his chief European baseball scout, hoping to discover any hidden talent in that untapped market. In 1919, Ban Johnson, the American League president enlisted Lange as his chief organizer of baseball teams in Europe, mainly in England, France, Belgium, and Italy. Johnson's plan was for Lange to evaluate talent and establish an International Baseball League that could compete against the American League pennant winning team in an effort to generate greater interest in the game. Lange became part of the board of directors at the YMCA, which helped fund the expedition. Additionally, Washington Senators owner Clark Griffith donated $40,000 worth of equipment to assist in supplying the new league.

Lange died at the age of 79 in his hometown of San Francisco, and is interred at the Holy Cross Cemetery in Colma, California. Two of his nephews played Major League ball as well, Ren, and George "Highpockets" Kelly. George later gained induction into the Baseball Hall of Fame in 1973.

== See also ==
- List of Major League Baseball annual stolen base leaders
- List of Major League Baseball career stolen bases leaders
