= List of Major League Baseball career stolen bases leaders =

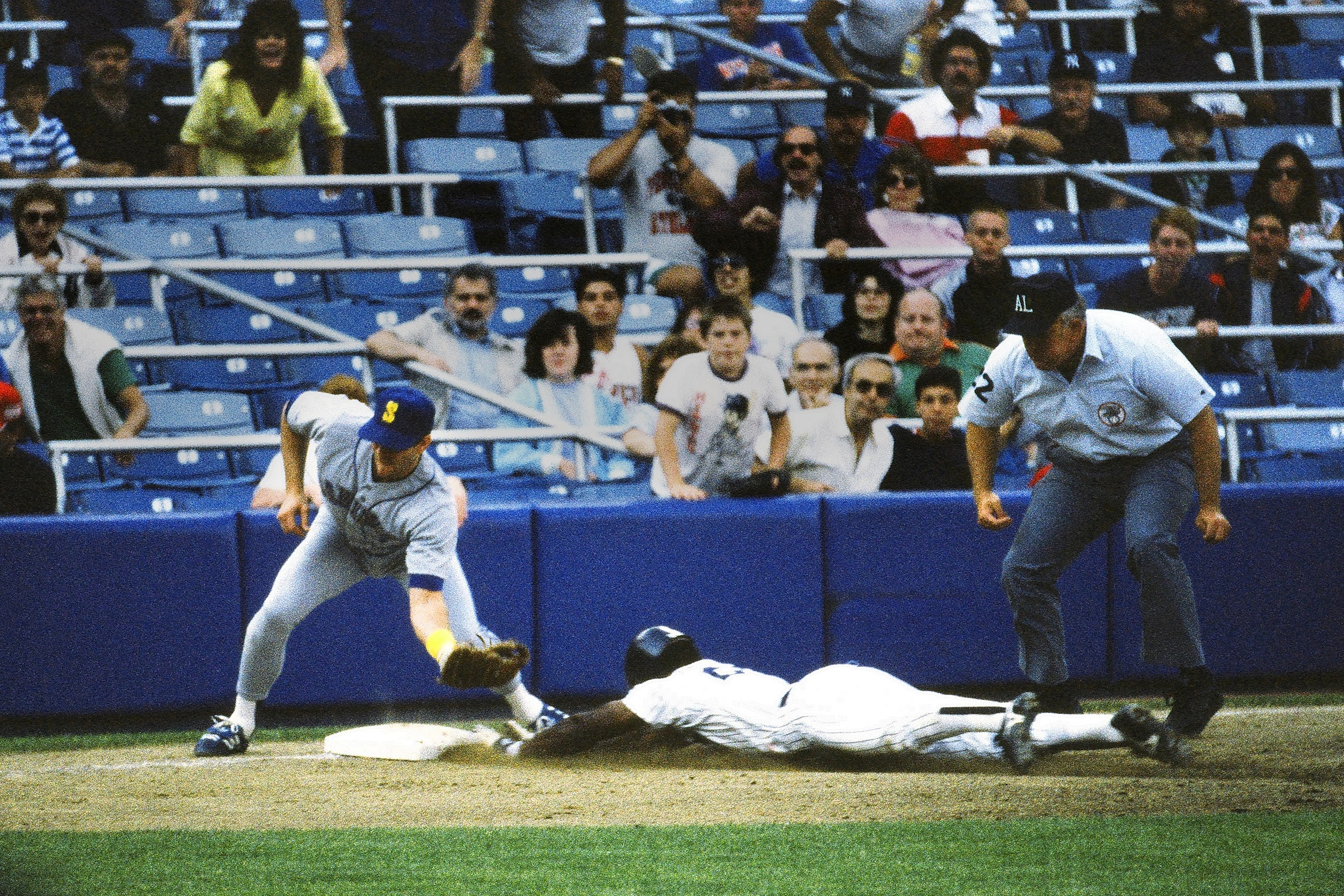
Rickey Henderson is the all-time stolen bases leader, stealing 1,406 bases during his 24-year career.

In baseball statistics, a stolen base is credited to a baserunner when he successfully advances to the next base while the pitcher is throwing the ball to home plate. Under Rule 5.06 of Major League Baseball's (MLB) Official Rules, a runner acquires the right to an unoccupied base when he touches it before he is out. Such a play is considered a stolen base when they reach that base unaided by another event, including a hit, putout, or error, under Rule 9.07. Stolen bases were more common in baseball's dead-ball era, when teams relied more on stolen bases and hit and run plays than on home runs.

Rickey Henderson holds the MLB career stolen base record with 1,406. He is the only MLB player to steal 1,000 bases. Following Henderson is Lou Brock with 938 stolen bases; Billy Hamilton is third on the all-time steals listing. Hamilton's career steals total varies by source, but all sources place him third on the list above Ty Cobb (897), Tim Raines (808), Vince Coleman (752), Arlie Latham (742), Eddie Collins (741), Max Carey (738), and Honus Wagner (723), who are the only other players to have stolen at least 700 bases. Coleman is the leader for retired players who are not members of the Hall of Fame.

Brock held the all-time career stolen bases before being surpassed by Henderson in 1991. Brock had held the record since 1977. Before Brock, Hamilton held the record for eighty-one years, from 1897 to 1977. Before that, Latham held the record from 1887 to 1896. Latham was also the first player to collect 300 career stolen bases. With Kenny Lofton's retirement in 2007, 2008 was the first season since 1967 in which no active player had more than 500 career stolen bases. Between 2008 and 2010, no active player had more than 500 stolen bases until Juan Pierre collected his 500th stolen base on August 5, 2010. He was the leader in stolen bases for active players until his retirement at the end of the 2013 season. Since Ichiro Suzuki retired early in the 2019 season, no active player has topped 400 steals. As of July 22, 2026, there is one active player is in the list of top 100 base stealers. The active leader in stolen bases is Starling Marte who is tied for 100th all-time with 363.

== Key ==
Rank	Rank amongst leaders in career stolen bases. A blank field indicates a tie.
Player	Name of player.
SB	Total career stolen bases.
*	denotes elected to National Baseball Hall of Fame.
	denotes active player.

== List ==
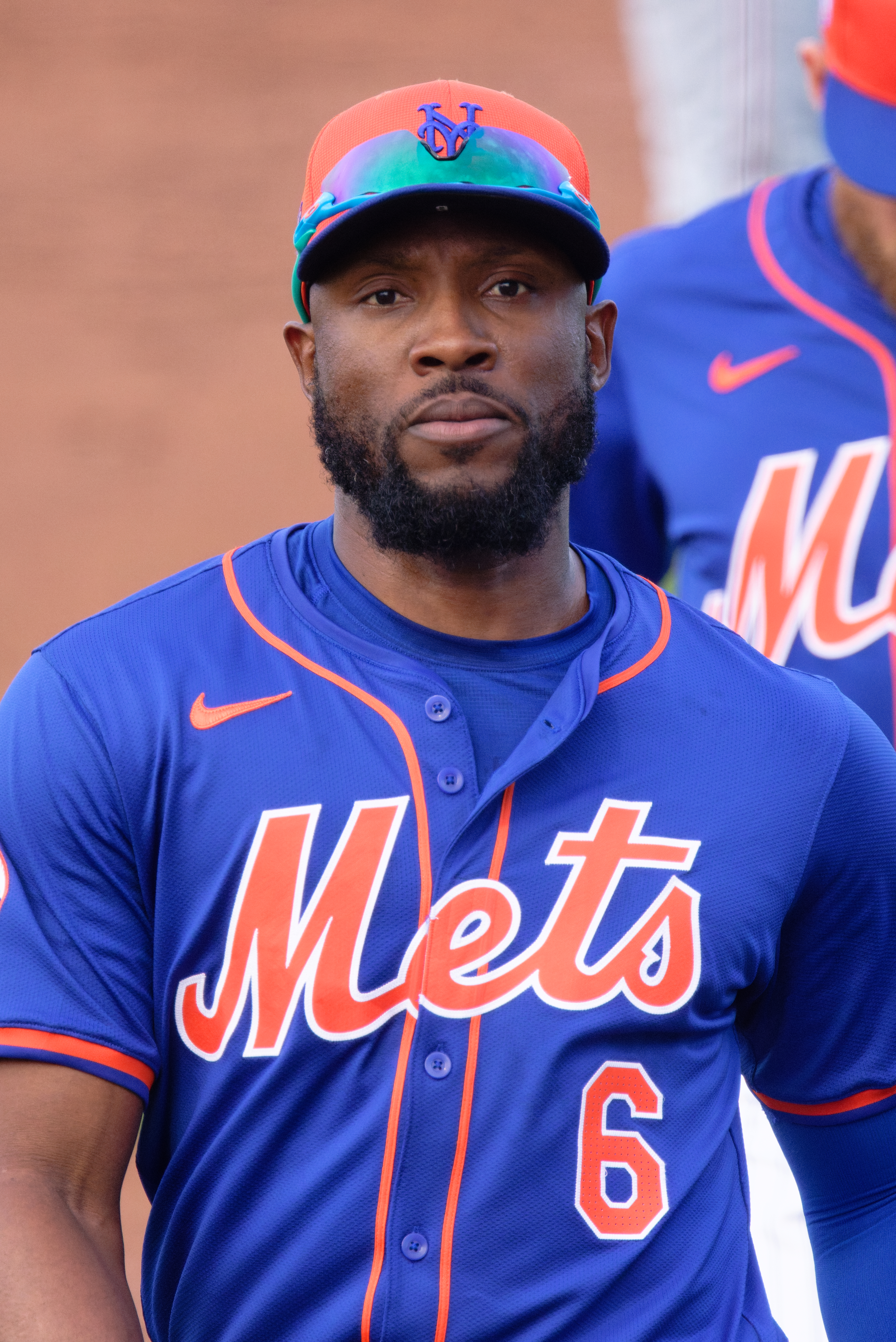
Starling Marte is the active leader in stolen bases and tied for 100th all-time.

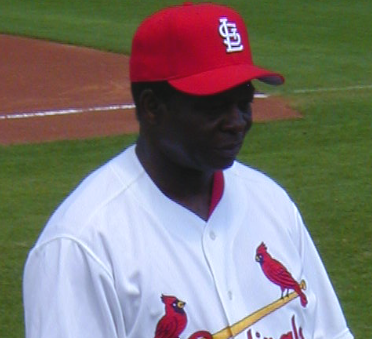
Lou Brock held the stolen base record from 1977 to 1991 and is one of just three players with more than 900 career stolen bases.

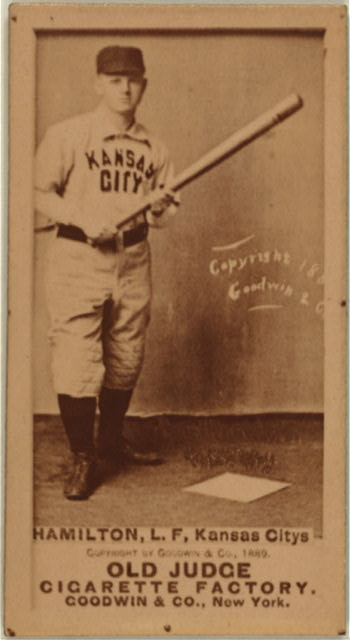
Sliding Billy Hamilton held the stolen base record for 80 years.

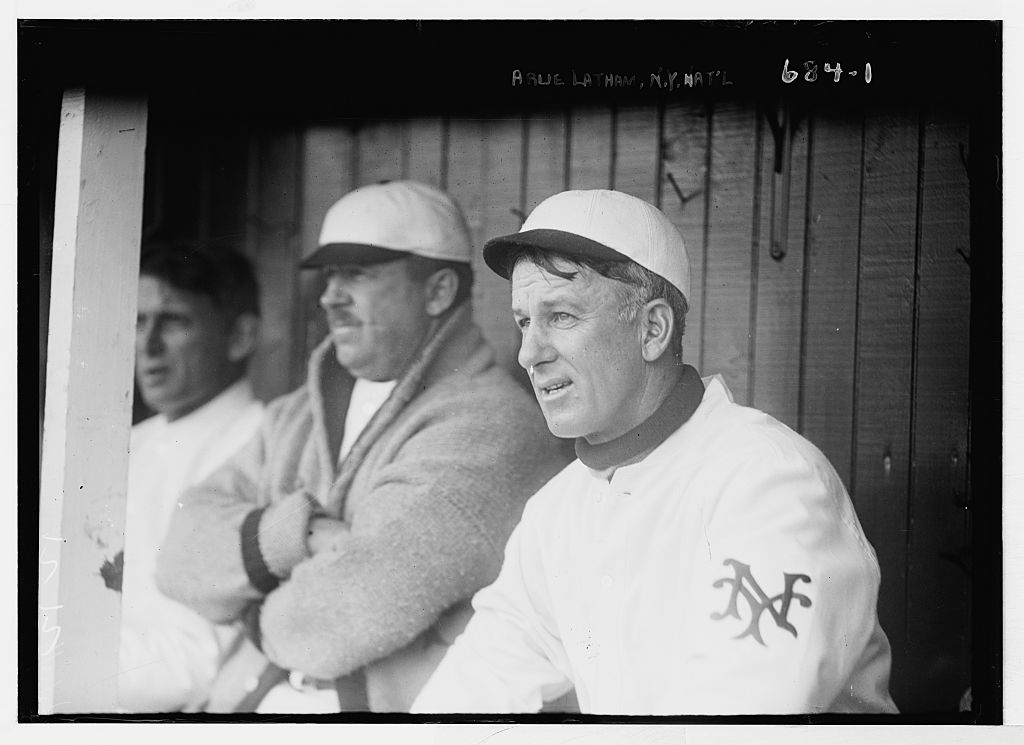
Arlie Latham was the stolen base record holder from 1887 to 1896.

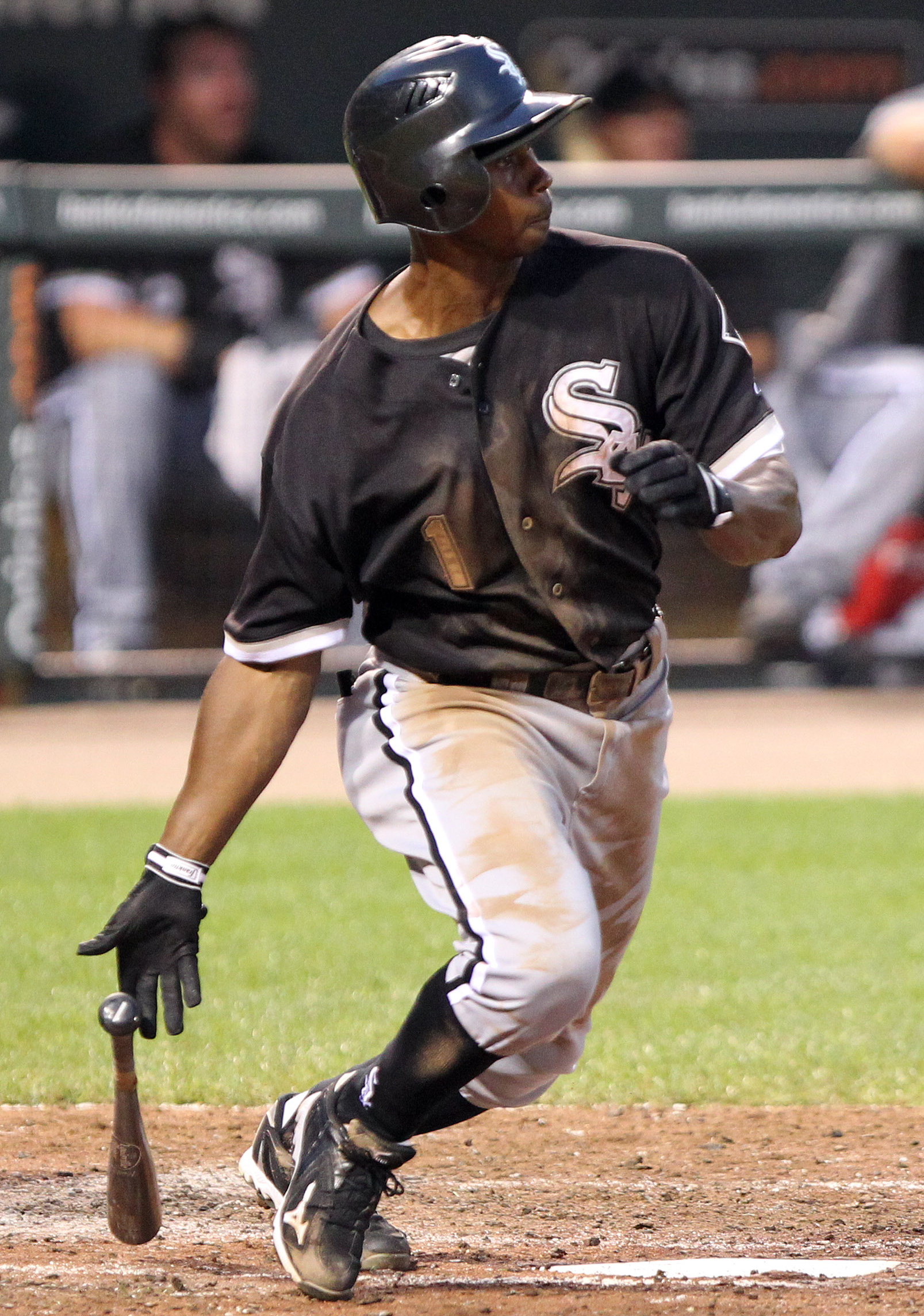
Juan Pierre won multiple stolen base titles and finished his career with 614 stolen bases.

- Stats updated as of July 22, 2026.

Rank	Player	SB
1	Rickey Henderson*	1,406
2	Lou Brock*	938
3	Billy Hamilton*	912
4	Ty Cobb*	892
5	Tim Raines*	808
6	Vince Coleman	752
7	Eddie Collins*	745
8	Arlie Latham	739
9	Max Carey*	738
10	Honus Wagner*	722
11	Joe Morgan*	689
12	Willie Wilson	668
13	Tom Brown	657
14	Bert Campaneris	649
15	Kenny Lofton	622
16	Otis Nixon	620
17	George Davis*	616
18	Juan Pierre	614
19	Dummy Hoy	594
20	Maury Wills	586
21	George Van Haltren	583
22	Ozzie Smith*	580
23	Hugh Duffy*	574
24	Bid McPhee*	568
25	Brett Butler	558
26	Davey Lopes	557
27	Cesar Cedeño	550
28	Bill Dahlen	547
29	John Ward*	540
30	Herman Long	536
31	Patsy Donovan	518
32	José Reyes	517
33	Jack Doyle	516
34	Barry Bonds	514
35	Ichiro Suzuki*	509
	Harry Stovey	509
37	Luis Aparicio*	506
	Fred Clarke*	506
39	Paul Molitor*	504
40	Willie Keeler*	495
	Clyde Milan	495
42	Omar Moreno	487
43	Carl Crawford	480
44	Roberto Alomar*	474
45	Mike Griffin	473
46	Jimmy Rollins	470
47	Tommy McCarthy*	468
48	Jimmy Sheckard	465
	Eric Young	465
50	Delino DeShields	463

Rank	Player	SB
51	Bobby Bonds	461
52	Ed Delahanty*	455
	Ron LeFlore	455
54	Curt Welch	453
55	Steve Sax	444
56	Joe Kelley*	443
57	Sherry Magee	441
58	John McGraw*	436
59	Tris Speaker*	432
60	Marquis Grissom	429
61	Bob Bescher	428
	Mike Tiernan	428
63	Charlie Comiskey*	419
	Frankie Frisch*	419
65	Jimmy Ryan	418
66	Rajai Davis	415
67	Craig Biggio*	414
68	Johnny Damon	408
	Tommy Harper	408
70	Chuck Knoblauch	407
71	Donie Bush	404
	Omar Vizquel	404
73	Frank Chance*	401
74	Bobby Abreu	400
75	Bill Lange	399
76	Willie Davis	398
77	Sam Mertes	396
	Juan Samuel	396
79	Dave Collins	395
	Billy North	395
81	Jesse Burkett*	389
82	Tommy Corcoran	387
83	Tom Daly	385
	Freddie Patek	385
85	George Burns	383
	Hugh Nicol	383
87	Fred Pfeffer	382
88	Walt Wilmot	381
89	Nap Lajoie*	380
90	Barry Larkin*	379
91	Harry Hooper*	375
	George Sisler*	375
93	Jack Glasscock	372
94	Luis Castillo	370
	Lonnie Smith	370
96	Tom Goodwin	369
97	King Kelly*	368
98	Sam Crawford*	366
	Tommy Dowd	366
100	Hal Chase	363
	Starling Marte (2)	363
	Tony Womack	363
