= List of Major League Baseball progressive career home runs leaders =

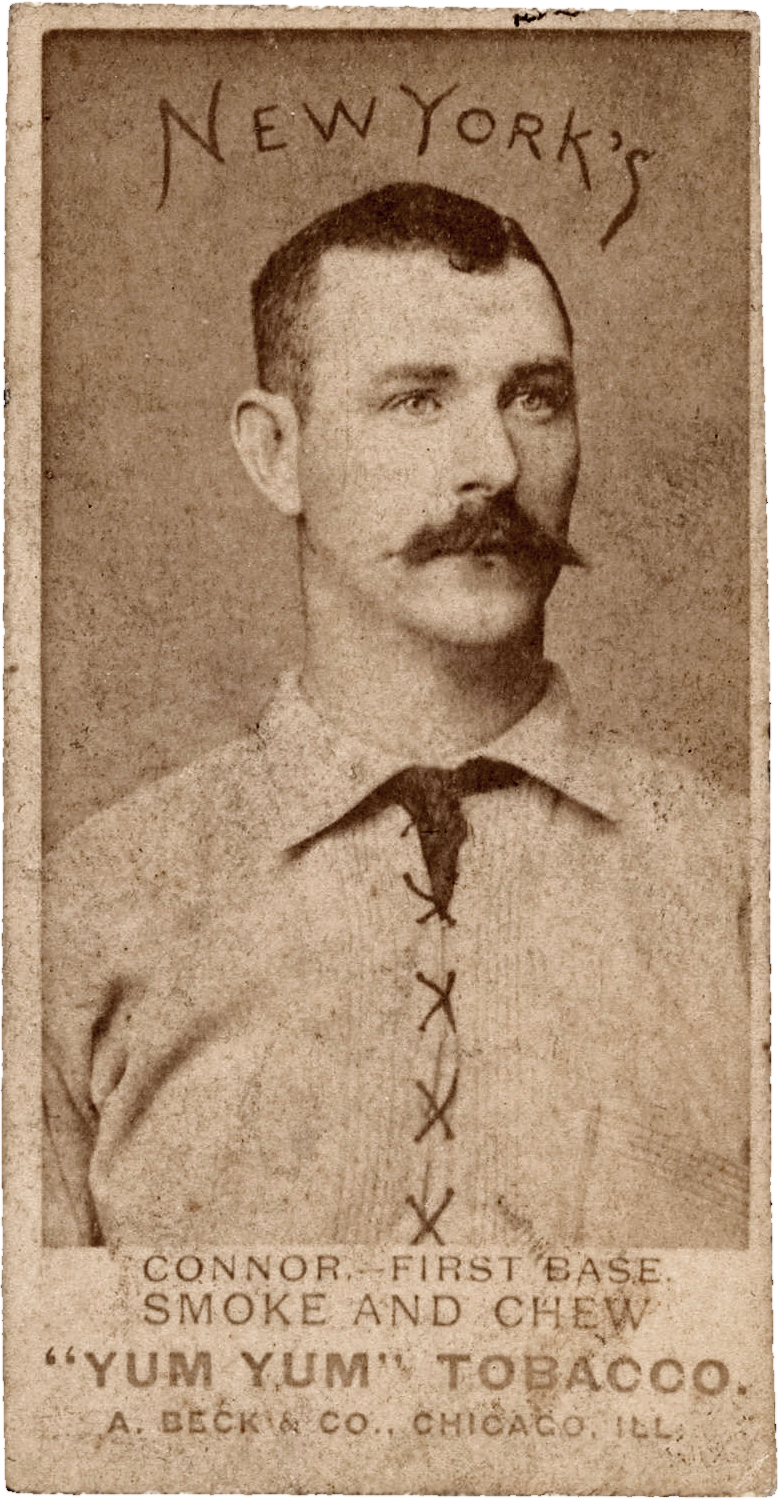
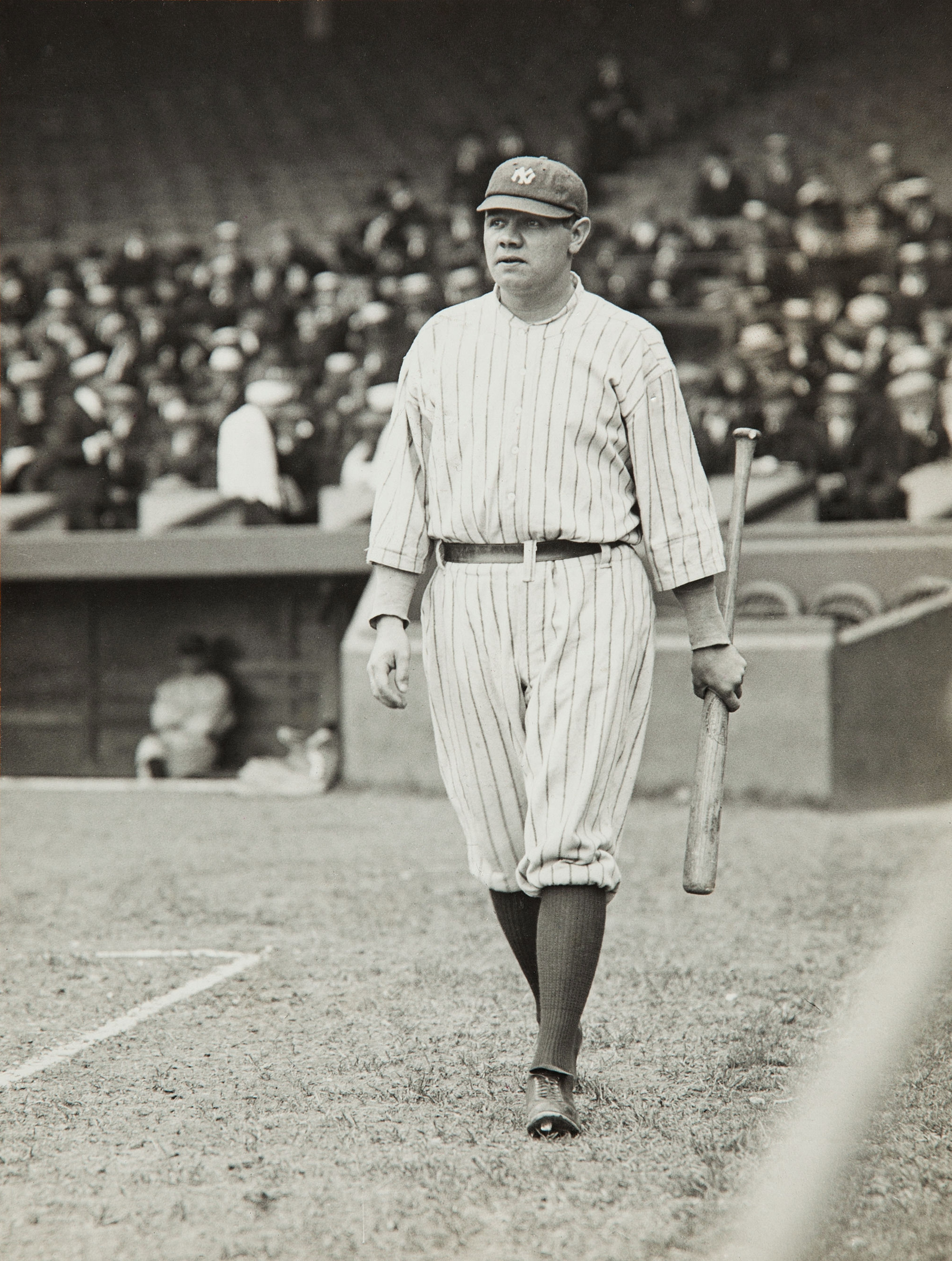
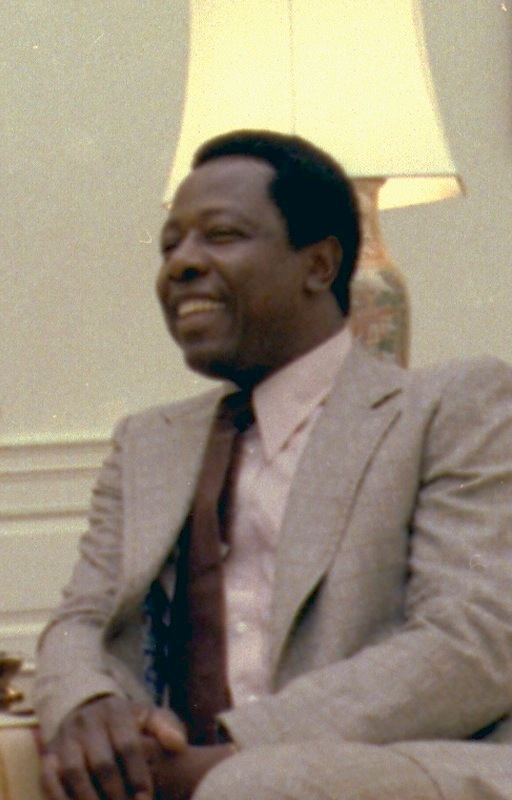
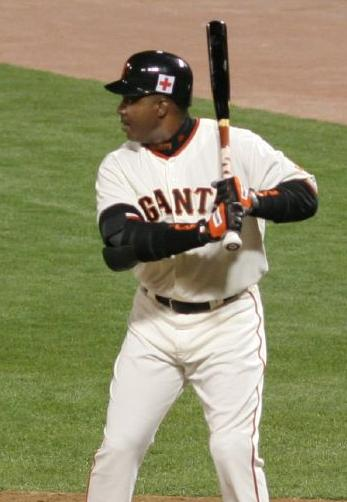
Only four players—Roger Connor, Babe Ruth, Hank Aaron, and Barry Bonds (left to right)—have held the career home run record since 1895, 131 years ago.

The following is a chronology of the top ten leaders in lifetime home runs in Major League Baseball. This includes any home runs hit by a player during official regular season games (i.e., excluding playoffs or exhibition games) in the National Association (1871–1875), National League (since 1876), the American Association (1882–1891), the Union Association (1884), the Players' League (1890), the American League (since 1901), and the Federal League (1914–1915).

The list helps contextualize the evolution of one of the most prized achievements in United States sports. In the early 1930s, Babe Ruth had almost 400 more home runs than the next player, his longtime teammate Lou Gehrig; when Joe DiMaggio retired in 1951, he was fifth on the all-time list.

== Career home run leaders by year ==
Key to symbols in player table
†	Player inducted into the Baseball Hall of Fame
‡	Player is still active

Year	1st	2nd	3rd	4th	5th	6th	7th	8th	9th	10th	(tied)
1871	Meyerle; 4	Pike; 4	Treacey; 4	Bass; 3	Cuthbert; 3	Sutton; 3					
1872	Pike; 10	Treacey; 6	Meyerle; 5	Cuthbert; 4	Bass; 3	Gedney; 3	Hall; 3	Sutton; 3	Wood; 3	T York; 3	
1873	Pike; 14	Meyerle; 8	Treacey; 7	Cuthbert; 6	T York; 5	Wright†; 5	Gedney; 4				
1874	Pike; 15	Meyerle; 9	Cuthbert; 8	Treacey; 7	Wright†; 7	O'Rourke†; 6	Clapp; 5	Gedney; 5	McVey; 5	T York; 5	
1875	Pike; 15	O'Rourke†; 12	Meyerle; 10	Wright†; 9	Cuthbert; 8	Hall; 8	McVey; 8	Start; 8	Treacey; 7	White†; 5	Gedney, T York, Clapp 5
1876	Pike; 16	O'Rourke†; 14	Hall; 13	Meyerle; 10	Wright†; 10	McVey; 9	Cuthbert; 8	Start; 8	Treacey; 7	T York; 6	White†; 6
1877	Pike; 20	O'Rourke†; 14	Hall; 13	Meyerle; 10	Wright†; 10	McVey; 9	Start; 9	Cuthbert; 8	White†; 8	Treacey; 7	T York; 7
1878	Pike; 20	O'Rourke†; 15	Hall; 13	McVey; 11	Meyerle; 10	Start; 10	Wright†; 10	Jones; 9	Cuthbert; 8	White†; 8	T York; 8
1879	Pike; 20	Jones; 18	O'Rourke†; 16	Hall; 13	Start; 12	McVey; 11	Wright†; 11	Meyerle; 10	Hines; 9	White†; 9	T York; 9
1880	Jones; 23	O'Rourke†; 22	Pike; 20	Hall; 13	Hines; 12	Start; 12	McVey; 11	Wright†; 11	Meyerle; 10	White†; 9	Jo O'Rourke, T York 9
1881	Jones; 23	O'Rourke†; 22	Pike; 20	Hines; 14	Hall; 13	Brouthers†; 12	Start; 12	Wright†; 11	T York; 11	McVey; 11	
1882	O'Rourke†; 24	Jones; 23	Pike; 20	Brouthers†; 18	Hines; 18	Bennett; 13	Hall; 13	Stovey; 13	Start; 12	T York; 12	
1883	Jones; 33	Stovey; 27	O'Rourke†; 25	Hines; 22	Brouthers†; 21	Pike; 20	Bennett; 18	Farrell; 14	Wood; 14	T York; 14	
1884	Jones; 40	Stovey; 37	Brouthers†; 35	Williamson; 35	O'Rourke†; 30	Pfeffer; 27	Anson†; 26	Dalrymple; 26	Hines; 25	Dunlap; 24	
1885	Stovey; 50	Jones; 45	Brouthers†; 42	Williamson; 38	Dalrymple; 37	O'Rourke†; 35	Anson†; 33	Pfeffer; 32	K Kelly†; 31	Wood; 27	
1886	Stovey; 57	Brouthers†; 53	Jones; 51	Williamson; 44	Anson†; 43	Dalrymple; 40	Pfeffer; 39	O'Rourke†; 36	Hines; 35	K Kelly†; 35	
1887	Brouthers†; 65	Stovey; 61	Jones; 56	Pfeffer; 55	Williamson; 53	Anson†; 50	Hines; 45	Wood; 45	K Kelly†; 43	Dalrymple; 42	
1888	Brouthers†; 74	Stovey; 70	Pfeffer; 63	Anson†; 62	Williamson; 61	Jones; 56	Reilly; 54	Connor†; 53	Denny; 52	K Kelly†; 52	
1889	Stovey; 89	Brouthers†; 81	Denny; 70	Pfeffer; 70	Anson†; 69	Connor†; 66	Williamson; 62	K Kelly†; 61	Reilly; 59	Jones; 56	Wood; 56
1890	Stovey; 101	Brouthers†; 82	Connor†; 80	Anson†; 76	Pfeffer; 75	Denny; 73	K Kelly†; 65	Reilly; 65	Wood; 65	Williamson; 64	
1891	Stovey; 117	Brouthers†; 87	Connor†; 87	Anson†; 84	Pfeffer; 82	Denny; 73	Reilly; 69	Richardson; 68	Wood; 68	K Kelly†; 67	
1892	Stovey; 121	Connor†; 99	Brouthers†; 92	Anson†; 85	Pfeffer; 84	Denny; 73	Ryan; 73	Thompson†; 72	Richardson; 70	K Kelly†; 69	Reilly; 69
1893	Stovey; 122	Connor†; 110	Brouthers†; 94	Pfeffer; 87	Anson†; 85	Thompson†; 83	Tiernan; 77	Ryan; 76	Denny; 74	Richardson; 70	
1894	Stovey; 122	Connor†; 118	Brouthers†; 103	Thompson†; 96	Pfeffer; 92	Anson†; 90	Tiernan; 82	Ryan; 79	Denny; 74	Richardson; 70	
1895	Connor†; 126	Stovey; 122	Thompson†; 114	Brouthers†; 105	Anson†; 92	Pfeffer; 92	Tiernan; 89	Ryan; 85	Denny; 74	Duffy†; 73	
1896	Connor†; 137	Thompson†; 126	Stovey; 122	Brouthers†; 106	Tiernan; 96	Anson†; 94	Pfeffer; 94	Ryan; 88	Duffy†; 78	Denny; 74	
1897	Connor†; 138	Thompson†; 126	Stovey; 122	Brouthers†; 106	Tiernan; 101	Anson†; 97	Pfeffer; 94	Ryan; 93	Duffy†; 89	Denny; 74	
1898	Connor†; 138	Thompson†; 127	Stovey; 122	Brouthers†; 106	Tiernan; 106	Anson†; 97	Duffy†; 97	Ryan; 97	Pfeffer; 94	Clements; 76	
1899	Connor†; 138	Thompson†; 127	Stovey; 122	Brouthers†; 106	Tiernan; 106	Duffy†; 102	Ryan; 100	Anson†; 97	Pfeffer; 94	Delahanty†; 80	
1900	Connor†; 138	Thompson†; 127	Stovey; 122	Brouthers†; 106	Tiernan; 106	Ryan; 105	Duffy†; 104	Anson†; 97	Pfeffer; 94	Long; 86	
1901	Connor†; 138	Thompson†; 127	Stovey; 122	Brouthers†; 106	Duffy†; 106	Tiernan; 106	Ryan; 105	Anson†; 97	Pfeffer; 94	Delahanty†; 90	
1902	Connor†; 138	Thompson†; 127	Stovey; 122	Ryan; 111	Brouthers†; 106	Duffy†; 106	Tiernan; 106	Delahanty†; 100	Anson†; 97	Pfeffer; 94	
1903 –1913	Connor†; 138	Thompson†; 127	Stovey; 122	Ryan; 118	Brouthers†; 106	Duffy†; 106	Tiernan; 106	Delahanty†; 101	Anson†; 97	Pfeffer; 94	
1914	Connor†; 138	Thompson†; 127	Stovey; 122	Ryan; 118	Brouthers†; 106	Duffy†; 106	Tiernan; 106	Delahanty†; 101	Anson†; 97	Pfeffer; 94	Wagner†; 94
1915	Connor†; 138	Thompson†; 127	Stovey; 122	Ryan; 118	Brouthers†; 106	Duffy†; 106	Tiernan; 106	Delahanty†; 101	Wagner†; 100	Anson†; 97	
1916	Connor†; 138	Thompson†; 127	Stovey; 122	Ryan; 118	Brouthers†; 106	Duffy†; 106	Tiernan; 106	Delahanty†; 101	Wagner†; 101	Anson†; 97	
1917	Connor†; 138	Thompson†; 127	Stovey; 122	Ryan; 118	Brouthers†; 106	Duffy†; 106	Tiernan; 106	Delahanty†; 101	Wagner†; 101	Cravath; 98	
1918	Connor†; 138	Thompson†; 127	Stovey; 122	Ryan; 118	Brouthers†; 106	Cravath; 106	Duffy†; 106	Tiernan; 106	Delahanty†; 101	Wagner†; 101	
1919	Connor†; 138	Thompson†; 127	Stovey; 122	Ryan; 118	Cravath; 118	Brouthers†; 106	Duffy†; 106	Tiernan; 106	Delahanty†; 101	Wagner†; 101	
1920	Connor†; 138	Thompson†; 127	Stovey; 122	Cravath; 119	Ryan; 118	Brouthers†; 106	Duffy†; 106	Tiernan; 106	Ruth†; 103	Delahanty†; 101	Wagner†; 101
1921	Ruth†; 162	Connor†; 138	Thompson†; 127	Stovey; 122	Cravath; 119	Ryan; 118	Brouthers†; 106	Duffy†; 106	Tiernan; 106	Delahanty†; 101	Wagner†; 101
1922	Ruth†; 197	Connor†; 138	Thompson†; 127	Stovey; 122	Cravath; 119	Ryan; 118	Walker; 116	C Williams; 108	Brouthers†; 106	Duffy†; 106	Tiernan; 106
1923	Ruth†; 238	C Williams; 149	Connor†; 138	Thompson†; 127	Stovey; 122	Cravath; 119	Ryan; 118	Walker; 118	Hornsby†; 116	K Williams; 108	
1924	Ruth†; 284	C Williams; 173	Hornsby†; 141	Connor†; 138	Thompson†; 127	K Williams; 126	Stovey; 122	Cravath; 119	Ryan; 118	Walker; 118	
1925	Ruth†; 309	C Williams; 186	Hornsby†; 180	K Williams; 151	Connor†; 138	Thompson†; 127	Wheat†; 126	Stovey; 122	Cravath; 119	Ryan; 118	Walker; 118
1926	Ruth†; 356	C Williams; 204	Hornsby†; 191	K Williams; 168	Connor†; 138	Wheat†; 131	Thompson†; 127	Fournier; 126	G Kelly†; 123	Stovey; 122	
1927	Ruth†; 416	C Williams; 234	Hornsby†; 217	K Williams; 185	Connor†; 138	Fournier; 136	Heilmann†; 135	Wheat†; 132	G Kelly†; 128	Thompson†; 127	
1928	Ruth†; 470	C Williams; 246	Hornsby†; 238	K Williams; 193	Heilmann†; 149	Connor†; 138	Fournier; 136	Meusel; 136	Wheat†; 132	G Kelly†; 131	
1929	Ruth†; 516	Hornsby†; 277	C Williams; 251	K Williams; 196	Heilmann†; 164	Bottomley†; 146	Gehrig†; 146	Meusel; 146	Connor†; 138	Wilson†; 137	
1930	Ruth†; 565	Hornsby†; 279	C Williams; 251	K Williams; 196	Wilson†; 193	Gehrig†; 187	Heilmann†; 183	Bottomley†; 161	Meusel; 156	Simmons†; 151	
1931	Ruth†; 611	Hornsby†; 295	C Williams; 251	Gehrig†; 233	Wilson†; 206	K Williams; 196	Heilmann†; 183	Simmons†; 173	Bottomley†; 170	Goslin†; 169	
1932	Ruth†; 652	Hornsby†; 296	Gehrig†; 267	C Williams; 251	Wilson†; 229	Simmons†; 208	K Williams; 196	Goslin†; 186	Heilmann†; 183	Bottomley†; 181	
1933	Ruth†; 686	Gehrig†; 299	Hornsby†; 299	C Williams; 251	Wilson†; 238	Foxx†; 222	Simmons†; 222	Goslin†; 196	K Williams; 196	Bottomley†; 194	
1934	Ruth†; 708	Gehrig†; 348	Hornsby†; 300	Foxx†; 266	C Williams; 251	Wilson†; 244	Simmons†; 240	Klein†; 211	Ott†; 211	Goslin†; 209	
1935	Ruth†; 714	Gehrig†; 378	Foxx†; 302	Hornsby†; 300	Simmons†; 256	C Williams; 251	Wilson†; 244	Ott†; 242	Klein†; 232	Goslin†; 218	
1936	Ruth†; 714	Gehrig†; 427	Foxx†; 343	Hornsby†; 300	Ott†; 275	Simmons†; 269	Klein†; 257	C Williams; 251	Wilson†; 244	Goslin†; 242	
1937	Ruth†; 714	Gehrig†; 464	Foxx†; 379	Ott†; 306	Hornsby†; 301	Simmons†; 277	Klein†; 272	C Williams; 251	Goslin†; 246	Wilson†; 244	
1938	Ruth†; 714	Gehrig†; 493	Foxx†; 429	Ott†; 342	Hornsby†; 301	Simmons†; 298	Klein†; 280	C Williams; 251	Goslin†; 248	Wilson†; 244	
1939	Ruth†; 714	Gehrig†; 493	Foxx†; 464	Ott†; 369	Simmons†; 305	Hornsby†; 301	Klein†; 292	C Williams; 251	Goslin†; 248	Wilson†; 244	
1940	Ruth†; 714	Foxx†; 500	Gehrig†; 493	Ott†; 388	Simmons†; 306	Hornsby†; 301	Klein†; 299	C Williams; 251	Goslin†; 248	Greenberg†; 247	
1941	Ruth†; 714	Foxx†; 519	Gehrig†; 493	Ott†; 415	Simmons†; 306	Hornsby†; 301	Klein†; 300	C Williams; 251	Greenberg†; 249	Goslin†; 248	
1942	Ruth†; 714	Foxx†; 527	Gehrig†; 493	Ott†; 445	Simmons†; 306	Hornsby†; 301	Klein†; 300	Johnson; 252	C Williams; 251	Greenberg†; 249	
1943	Ruth†; 714	Foxx†; 527	Gehrig†; 493	Ott†; 463	Simmons†; 307	Hornsby†; 301	Klein†; 300	Johnson; 259	C Williams; 251	Greenberg†; 249	
1944	Ruth†; 714	Foxx†; 527	Gehrig†; 493	Ott†; 489	Simmons†; 307	Hornsby†; 301	Klein†; 300	Johnson; 276	C Williams; 251	Greenberg†; 249	
1945	Ruth†; 714	Foxx†; 534	Ott†; 510	Gehrig†; 493	Simmons†; 307	Hornsby†; 301	Klein†; 300	Johnson; 288	Greenberg†; 262	C Williams; 251	
1946	Ruth†; 714	Foxx†; 534	Ott†; 511	Gehrig†; 493	Simmons†; 307	Greenberg†; 306	Hornsby†; 301	Klein†; 300	Johnson; 288	R York; 256	
1947	Ruth†; 714	Foxx†; 534	Ott†; 511	Gehrig†; 493	Greenberg†; 331	Simmons†; 307	Hornsby†; 301	Klein†; 300	Johnson; 288	R York; 277	
1948	Ruth†; 714	Foxx†; 534	Ott†; 511	Gehrig†; 493	Greenberg†; 331	Simmons†; 307	DiMaggio†; 303	Hornsby†; 301	Klein†; 300	Mize†; 297	
1949	Ruth†; 714	Foxx†; 534	Ott†; 511	Gehrig†; 493	Greenberg†; 331	DiMaggio†; 317	Mize†; 316	Simmons†; 307	Hornsby†; 301	Klein†; 300	
1950	Ruth†; 714	Foxx†; 534	Ott†; 511	Gehrig†; 493	DiMaggio†; 349	Mize†; 341	Greenberg†; 331	Simmons†; 307	Hornsby†; 301	Klein†; 300	
1951	Ruth†; 714	Foxx†; 534	Ott†; 511	Gehrig†; 493	DiMaggio†; 361	Mize†; 351	Greenberg†; 331	T Williams†; 323	Simmons†; 307	Hornsby†; 301	
1952	Ruth†; 714	Foxx†; 534	Ott†; 511	Gehrig†; 493	DiMaggio†; 361	Mize†; 355	Greenberg†; 331	T Williams†; 324	Simmons†; 307	Hornsby†; 301	
1953	Ruth†; 714	Foxx†; 534	Ott†; 511	Gehrig†; 493	DiMaggio†; 361	Mize†; 359	T Williams†; 337	Greenberg†; 331	Kiner†; 329	Simmons†; 307	
1954	Ruth†; 714	Foxx†; 534	Ott†; 511	Gehrig†; 493	T Williams†; 366	DiMaggio†; 361	Mize†; 359	Kiner†; 351	Greenberg†; 331	Simmons†; 307	
1955	Ruth†; 714	Foxx†; 534	Ott†; 511	Gehrig†; 493	T Williams†; 394	Kiner†; 369	DiMaggio†; 361	Mize†; 359	Greenberg†; 331	Musial†; 325	
1956	Ruth†; 714	Foxx†; 534	Ott†; 511	Gehrig†; 493	T Williams†; 418	Kiner†; 369	DiMaggio†; 361	Mize†; 359	Musial†; 352	Greenberg†; 331	
1957	Ruth†; 714	Foxx†; 534	Ott†; 511	Gehrig†; 493	T Williams†; 456	Musial†; 381	Kiner†; 369	DiMaggio†; 361	Mize†; 359	Greenberg†; 331	
1958	Ruth†; 714	Foxx†; 534	Ott†; 511	Gehrig†; 493	T Williams†; 482	Musial†; 398	Kiner†; 369	DiMaggio†; 361	Mize†; 359	Greenberg†; 331	Snider†; 331
1959	Ruth†; 714	Foxx†; 534	Ott†; 511	Gehrig†; 493	T Williams†; 492	Musial†; 412	Kiner†; 369	DiMaggio†; 361	Mize†; 359	Snider†; 354	
1960	Ruth†; 714	Foxx†; 534	T Williams†; 521	Ott†; 511	Gehrig†; 493	Musial†; 429	Kiner†; 369	Snider†; 368	DiMaggio†; 361	Mize†; 359	
1961	Ruth†; 714	Foxx†; 534	T Williams†; 521	Ott†; 511	Gehrig†; 493	Musial†; 444	Snider†; 384	Mantle†; 374	Mathews†; 370	Kiner†; 369	
1962	Ruth†; 714	Foxx†; 534	T Williams†; 521	Ott†; 511	Gehrig†; 493	Musial†; 463	Mantle†; 404	Mathews†; 399	Snider†; 389	Hodges†; 370	
1963	Ruth†; 714	Foxx†; 534	T Williams†; 521	Ott†; 511	Gehrig†; 493	Musial†; 475	Mathews†; 422	Mantle†; 419	Mays†; 406	Snider†; 403	
1964	Ruth†; 714	Foxx†; 534	T Williams†; 521	Ott†; 511	Gehrig†; 493	Musial†; 475	Mantle†; 454	Mays†; 453	Mathews†; 445	Snider†; 407	
1965	Ruth†; 714	Foxx†; 534	T Williams†; 521	Ott†; 511	Mays†; 505	Gehrig†; 493	Mathews†; 477	Musial†; 475	Mantle†; 473	Snider†; 407	
1966	Ruth†; 714	Mays†; 542	Foxx†; 534	T Williams†; 521	Ott†; 511	Mantle†; 496	Gehrig†; 493	Mathews†; 493	Musial†; 475	Aaron†; 442	
1967	Ruth†; 714	Mays†; 564	Foxx†; 534	T Williams†; 521	Mantle†; 518	Ott†; 511	Mathews†; 509	Gehrig†; 493	Aaron†; 481	Musial†; 475	
1968	Ruth†; 714	Mays†; 587	Mantle†; 536	Foxx†; 534	T Williams†; 521	Mathews†; 512	Ott†; 511	Aaron†; 510	Gehrig†; 493	Musial†; 475	
1969	Ruth†; 714	Mays†; 600	Aaron†; 554	Mantle†; 536	Foxx†; 534	T Williams†; 521	Mathews†; 512	Ott†; 511	Banks†; 497	Gehrig†; 493	
1970	Ruth†; 714	Mays†; 628	Aaron†; 592	Mantle†; 536	Foxx†; 534	T Williams†; 521	Mathews†; 512	Ott†; 511	Banks†; 509	Gehrig†; 493	
1971	Ruth†; 714	Mays†; 646	Aaron†; 639	Mantle†; 536	Foxx†; 534	T Williams†; 521	Killebrew†; 515	Mathews†; 512	Banks†; 512	Ott†; 511	
1972	Ruth†; 714	Aaron†; 673	Mays†; 654	Killebrew†; 541	Mantle†; 536	Foxx†; 534	Robinson†; 522	T Williams†; 521	Mathews†; 512	Banks†; 512	
1973	Ruth†; 714	Aaron†; 713	Mays†; 660	Robinson†; 552	Killebrew†; 546	Mantle†; 536	Foxx†; 534	T Williams†; 521	Mathews†; 512	Banks†; 512	
1974	Aaron†; 733	Ruth†; 714	Mays†; 660	Robinson†; 574	Killebrew†; 559	Mantle†; 536	Foxx†; 534	T Williams†; 521	Mathews†; 512	Banks†; 512	
1975	Aaron†; 745	Ruth†; 714	Mays†; 660	Robinson†; 583	Killebrew†; 573	Mantle†; 536	Foxx†; 534	T Williams†; 521	Mathews†; 512	Banks†; 512	
1976 –1978	Aaron†; 755	Ruth†; 714	Mays†; 660	Robinson†; 586	Killebrew†; 573	Mantle†; 536	Foxx†; 534	T Williams†; 521	Mathews†; 512	Banks†; 512	
1979	Aaron†; 755	Ruth†; 714	Mays†; 660	Robinson†; 586	Killebrew†; 573	Mantle†; 536	Foxx†; 534	T Williams†; 521	McCovey†; 520	Mathews†; 512	Banks†; 512
1980 –1984	Aaron†; 755	Ruth†; 714	Mays†; 660	Robinson†; 586	Killebrew†; 573	Mantle†; 536	Foxx†; 534	T Williams†; 521	McCovey†; 521	Mathews†; 512	Banks†; 512
1985	Aaron†; 755	Ruth†; 714	Mays†; 660	Robinson†; 586	Killebrew†; 573	Mantle†; 536	Foxx†; 534	Jackson†; 530	T Williams†; 521	McCovey†; 521	
1986	Aaron†; 755	Ruth†; 714	Mays†; 660	Robinson†; 586	Killebrew†; 573	Jackson†; 548	Mantle†; 536	Foxx†; 534	T Williams†; 521	McCovey†; 521	
1987	Aaron†; 755	Ruth†; 714	Mays†; 660	Robinson†; 586	Killebrew†; 573	Jackson†; 563	Mantle†; 536	Foxx†; 534	Schmidt†; 530	T Williams†; 521	McCovey†; 521
1988	Aaron†; 755	Ruth†; 714	Mays†; 660	Robinson†; 586	Killebrew†; 573	Jackson†; 563	Schmidt†; 542	Mantle†; 536	Foxx†; 534	T Williams†; 521	McCovey†; 521
1989 –1998	Aaron†; 755	Ruth†; 714	Mays†; 660	Robinson†; 586	Killebrew†; 573	Jackson†; 563	Schmidt†; 548	Mantle†; 536	Foxx†; 534	T Williams†; 521	McCovey†; 521
1999	Aaron†; 755	Ruth†; 714	Mays†; 660	Robinson†; 586	Killebrew†; 573	Jackson†; 563	Schmidt†; 548	Mantle†; 536	Foxx†; 534	McGwire; 522	
2000	Aaron†; 755	Ruth†; 714	Mays†; 660	Robinson†; 586	Killebrew†; 573	Jackson†; 563	McGwire; 554	Schmidt†; 548	Mantle†; 536	Foxx†; 534	
2001	Aaron†; 755	Ruth†; 714	Mays†; 660	Robinson†; 586	McGwire; 583	Killebrew†; 573	Bonds; 567	Jackson†; 563	Schmidt†; 548	Mantle†; 536	
2002	Aaron†; 755	Ruth†; 714	Mays†; 660	Bonds; 613	Robinson†; 586	McGwire; 583	Killebrew†; 573	Jackson†; 563	Schmidt†; 548	Mantle†; 536	
2003	Aaron†; 755	Ruth†; 714	Mays†; 660	Bonds; 658	Robinson†; 586	McGwire; 583	Killebrew†; 573	Jackson†; 563	Schmidt†; 548	Sosa; 539	
2004	Aaron†; 755	Ruth†; 714	Bonds; 703	Mays†; 660	Robinson†; 586	McGwire; 583	Sosa; 574	Killebrew†; 573	Jackson†; 563	Palmeiro; 551	
2005	Aaron†; 755	Ruth†; 714	Bonds; 708	Mays†; 660	Sosa; 588	Robinson†; 586	McGwire; 583	Killebrew†; 573	Palmeiro; 569	Jackson†; 563	
2006	Aaron†; 755	Bonds; 734	Ruth†; 714	Mays†; 660	Sosa; 588	Robinson†; 586	McGwire; 583	Killebrew†; 573	Palmeiro; 569	Griffey Jr.†; 563	Jackson†; 563
2007	Bonds; 762	Aaron†; 755	Ruth†; 714	Mays†; 660	Sosa; 609	Griffey Jr.†; 593	Robinson†; 586	McGwire; 583	Killebrew†; 573	Palmeiro; 569	
2008	Bonds; 762	Aaron†; 755	Ruth†; 714	Mays†; 660	Griffey Jr.†; 611	Sosa; 609	Robinson†; 586	McGwire; 583	Killebrew†; 573	Palmeiro; 569	
2009	Bonds; 762	Aaron†; 755	Ruth†; 714	Mays†; 660	Griffey Jr.†; 630	Sosa; 609	Robinson†; 586	McGwire; 583	Rodríguez; 583	Killebrew†; 573	
2010	Bonds; 762	Aaron†; 755	Ruth†; 714	Mays†; 660	Griffey Jr.†; 630	Rodríguez; 613	Sosa; 609	Thome†; 589	Robinson†; 586	McGwire; 583	
2011	Bonds; 762	Aaron†; 755	Ruth†; 714	Mays†; 660	Griffey Jr.†; 630	Rodríguez; 629	Sosa; 609	Thome†; 604	Robinson†; 586	McGwire; 583	
2012	Bonds; 762	Aaron†; 755	Ruth†; 714	Mays†; 660	Rodríguez; 647	Griffey Jr.†; 630	Thome†; 612	Sosa; 609	Robinson†; 586	McGwire; 583	
2013 –2014	Bonds; 762	Aaron†; 755	Ruth†; 714	Mays†; 660	Rodríguez; 654	Griffey Jr.†; 630	Thome†; 612	Sosa; 609	Robinson†; 586	McGwire; 583	
2015	Bonds; 762	Aaron†; 755	Ruth†; 714	Rodríguez; 687	Mays†; 660	Griffey Jr.†; 630	Thome†; 612	Sosa; 609	Robinson†; 586	McGwire; 583	
2016	Bonds; 762	Aaron†; 755	Ruth†; 714	Rodríguez; 696	Mays†; 660	Griffey Jr.†; 630	Thome†; 612	Sosa; 609	Pujols; 591	Robinson†; 586	
2017	Bonds; 762	Aaron†; 755	Ruth†; 714	Rodríguez; 696	Mays†; 660	Griffey Jr.†; 630	Pujols; 614	Thome†; 612	Sosa; 609	Robinson†; 586	
2018	Bonds; 762	Aaron†; 755	Ruth†; 714	Rodríguez; 696	Mays†; 660	Pujols; 633	Griffey†; 630	Thome†; 612	Sosa; 609	Robinson†; 586	
2019	Bonds; 762	Aaron†; 755	Ruth†; 714	Rodríguez; 696	Mays†; 660	Pujols; 656	Griffey†; 630	Thome†; 612	Sosa; 609	Robinson†; 586	
2020	Bonds; 762	Aaron†; 755	Ruth†; 714	Rodríguez; 696	Pujols; 662	Mays†; 660	Griffey†; 630	Thome†; 612	Sosa; 609	Robinson†; 586	
2021	Bonds; 762	Aaron†; 755	Ruth†; 714	Rodríguez; 696	Pujols; 679	Mays†; 660	Griffey Jr.†; 630	Thome†; 612	Sosa; 609	Robinson†; 586	
Since 2022	Bonds; 762	Aaron†; 755	Ruth†; 714	Pujols; 703	Rodríguez; 696	Mays†; 660	Griffey Jr.†; 630	Thome†; 612	Sosa; 609	Robinson†; 586	

Statistics updated through 2025 season.

== Leadership dates ==
Starting with Harry Stovey passing Charley Jones in August 1885, there have been seven changes of the career home run leader. Stovey held the title twice, having lost it to Dan Brouthers in June 1887 and then regaining it from Brouthers in August 1889. In the modern era—since the formation of the American League in 1901—there have only been four players who have held the title.

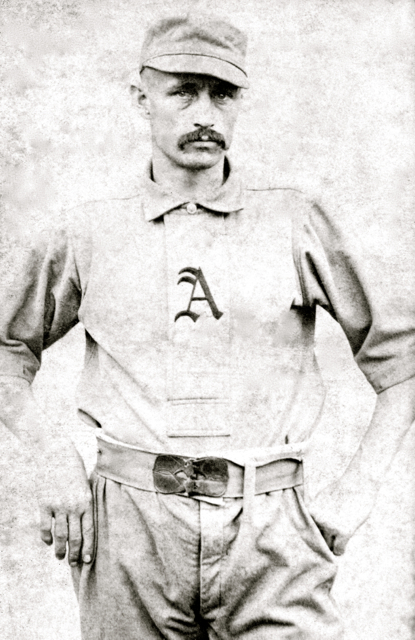
Harry Stovey held the career home run record twice during the late 1800s.

Player	Became leader		Career		Date surpassed	Duration of reign	Ref.
Player	HR no.	Date hit	Total HR	Last year	Date surpassed	Duration of reign	Ref.
Charley Jones			56	1888	August 11, 1885†		
Harry Stovey	46	August 11, 1885	122	1893	June 29, 1887†	1y 10m 18d	
Dan Brouthers	59	June 29, 1887	106	1904	August 13, 1889†	2y 1m 15d	
Harry Stovey	‡	August 13, 1889	122	1893	June 23, 1895	5y 10m 10d	
Roger Connor	123	June 23, 1895	138	1897	July 18, 1921	26y 25d	
Babe Ruth	139	July 18, 1921	714	1935	April 8, 1974	52y 8m 21d	
Hank Aaron	715	April 8, 1974	755	1976	August 7, 2007	33y 3m 30d	
Barry Bonds	756	August 7, 2007	762	2007	—	19y 2m 22d	

† indicates the player hit additional home runs after being passed.
‡ source material is unclear of Stovey's home run count when passing Brouthers

== See also ==
- Baseball statistics
- List of Major League Baseball annual home run leaders
- List of Major League Baseball progressive single-season home run leaders
- 500 home run club
- List of Major League Baseball career home run leaders
- List of Major League Baseball career hits leaders
- List of Major League Baseball career total bases leaders
- List of Major League Baseball career doubles leaders
- List of Major League Baseball career triples leaders
- The Year Babe Ruth Hit 104 Home Runs
