= Harry Stovey =

American baseball player (1856–1937)

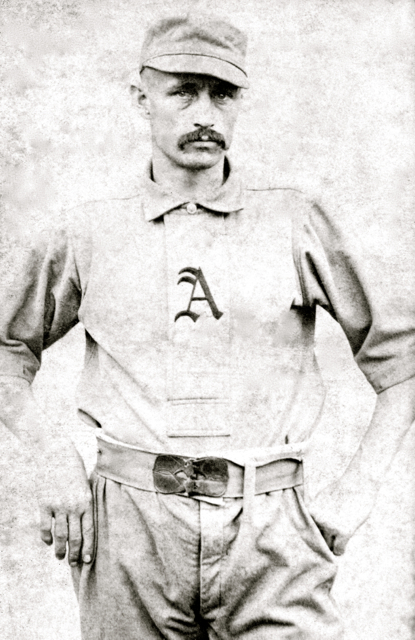
- Outfielder / First baseman
- Born: December 20, 1856; Philadelphia, Pennsylvania, U.S.
- Died: September 20, 1937 (aged 80); New Bedford, Massachusetts, U.S.
- Batted: Right Threw: Right

MLB debut
- May 1, 1880, for the Worcester Worcesters

Last MLB appearance
- July 29, 1893, for the Brooklyn Grooms

MLB statistics
- Batting average: .288
- Home runs: 122
- Runs batted in: 912
- Stolen bases: 509
- Stats at Baseball Reference

Teams
- As player: Worcester Worcesters (1880–1882); Philadelphia Athletics (1883–1889); Boston Reds (1890); Boston Beaneaters (1891–1892); Baltimore Orioles (1892–1893); Brooklyn Grooms (1893); As manager: Worcester Worcesters (1881); Philadelphia Athletics (1885)

Career highlights and awards
- AA pennant (1883); Players' League pennant (1890); 2× NL pennant (1891, 1892); 2× NL home run leader (1880, 1891); 3× AA home run leader (1883, 1885, 1889)

Harry Duffield Stovey (né Stowe; December 20, 1856 – September 20, 1937) was an American 19th-century Major League Baseball player and the first player in major league history to hit 100 home runs. Born in Philadelphia, Pennsylvania, Stovey played for fourteen seasons in the majors and was appointed player-manager on two separate occasions during his career.

Known today as both a prolific home run hitter and base-stealer, he led the league in both categories multiple times in his career, including a season record of fourteen home runs in 1883 and a league-leading 97 stolen bases in 1890. He stole 509 bases in his career, which is tied for 35th all-time; among players who played in fifteen seasons or less, he ranks sixth. Stovey finished in the top ten in home runs eleven times (1880–1886, 1888–1891), which included time in three leagues; he led a league in home runs five times. He also finished in the top ten in runs scored ten times, batting average six times, and on-base percentage seven times. He was the first to wear sliding pads and among the first to slide feet first.

== Baseball career ==
=== Philadelphia Defiance ===
In 1877, Harry began his career in the pitcher’s box and graduated out of the ranks of a Philadelphia amateur team called the Defiance (the Philadelphia Defiance were a professional team, part of the league Alliance).

=== New Bedford ===
In 1878, Frank Bancroft, owner/manager of the New Bedford Baseball Club, engaged Stovey to join his pitching staff. When the New Bedfords' John Piggot, first baseman, became ill during their first exhibition game of the season, Stovey was asked to take over, and played brilliantly enough that he replaced Piggott as the starting first basemen for the entire season.

=== Worcester ===
Harry was an outfielder / first baseman in 1880 for the Worcester Worcesters under the surname of Stovey instead of his birth name of Stowe due to his desire to keep his family from discovering he was making his career at baseball, which was seen at the time as not a respectable profession. He made an immediate impact that first season, leading the league with 14 triples and six home runs, while also finishing in the top ten in many other offensive categories. On July 17, he hit his first major league home run off Jim McCormick of the Cleveland Blues.

For the 1881 season, his offensive numbers did not slow down, again finishing in the top ten in several offensive categories, though he did not lead the league in any this time around. On August 17, 1881, Worcester suspended Captain Mike Dorgan‚ and Stovey took over the position for the remainder of the season. Lee Richmond‚ who had quit because of conflicts with Dorgan‚ rejoined the team after this switch.

In 1882, his last season for the Worcesters, his batting average saw an increase, up to .289 from .270 the year before, but his numbers in relation to the rest of the league took a slight dip. He ranked third in the league in runs scored, with 90, and fourth in the league in home runs, with five.

=== Philadelphia ===
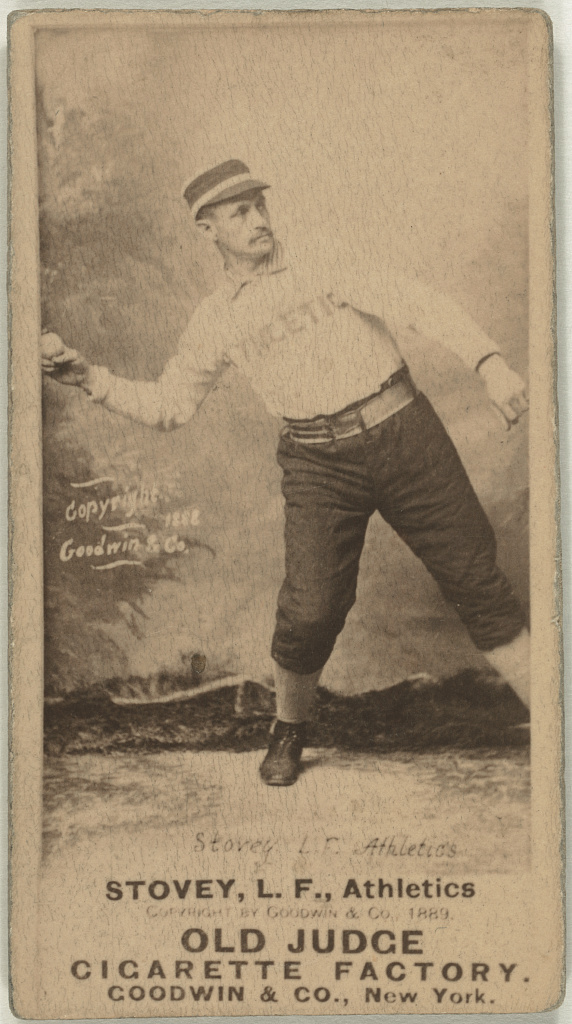
Baseball card of Stovey

For the 1883 season, Stovey moved on to play for the Philadelphia Athletics of the American Association, and it was during the next seven years when he had his best years, and made his greatest impact on the game. His first season in Philadelphia saw him set the single season record for home runs with fourteen, breaking the old mark of nine set by Charley Jones in 1879. That year, the Athletics won the league pennant, doing so with a record of 66–32 beating St. Louis by one game. Stovey kept this record for only one season, as Ned Williamson set a new mark the very next season with 27. Not only did he set the home run record, he batted .306, and led the league in runs scored with 110, doubles with 31, and games played with 112, while also finishing in the top five in most offensive categories. It was also the first of nine straight seasons where he collected 200+ total bases and 100+ runs scored.

The offensive explosiveness continued throughout his stay in Philadelphia, leading the league in runs scored four times, doubles once, triples three times, and home runs three times. The accumulation of home runs led him to become the career home run leader, overtaking Charley Jones with his 51st career homer on September 28, 1885. He held onto the career lead for a season until he was passed for a short period of time by Dan Brouthers for the 1886 and the 1887 seasons. Stovey regained the lead, and held it until Roger Connor passed him in 1895. 1886 was the first season with recordable data for stolen bases (albeit without caught stealing). That year, he led the league with 68 stolen bases.

=== Boston ===
In 1890, the Players' League, a rival league to the National League and the American Association, began, and it attracted many of the game's star players, including Stovey who "jumped" to the Boston Reds. He had a good season, batting .299, hit eleven triples, and twelve home runs while totaling 97 stolen bases. On September 3, 1890, Stovey became the first player to hit 100 homers for a career, off Jersey Bakley in a game against Cleveland, a significant milestone in a day when home runs were relatively rare. The Reds won the league pennant with a record of 81–48 (6½ games over Brooklyn) to garner Stovey's second league championship.

After the 1890 season, the Players' League folded with many of the players returning to their former ballclubs. Stovey‚ who played with the Athletics in 1889, was not claimed by that club through a clerical error, so on February 5, 1891, he signed with the Boston Beaneaters of the National League. In 134 games, he led the league that season with sixteen home runs and twenty triples, while also hitting .279 with 31 doubles as well. It proved to be last great season of his career.

=== Baltimore / Brooklyn ===
Stovey played only 38 games for the Beaneaters in 1892, before he was released on June 20, but he was quickly signed by the Baltimore Orioles. He finished the season with a .272 batting average with the Orioles and hit eleven triples, including three in one game on July 21 in a 10–3 victory over the Pittsburgh Pirates. In a total of 112 games, he batted .235/.326/.371 with 101 hits and 67 RBIs.

The 1893 season was Stovey's last season in the majors, playing 56 total games. He was released by the Orioles on May 22 after only eight games, and was signed three days later on May 15 by the Brooklyn Grooms. He finished the season with the Grooms and retired after the season was over.

=== Career statistics ===
In 1,489 games over fourteen seasons, Stovey posted a .288 batting average (1,775-for-6,153) with 1,495 runs, 348 doubles, 176 triples, 122 home runs, 912 RBI, 509 stolen bases, and 664 bases on balls. He finished his career with a .943 fielding percentage playing the outfield and first base.

== Post-career ==
After his career, Stovey returned to New Bedford, Massachusetts, where he had begun his baseball career, in order to manage the local amateur team in 1893. He subsequently worked as a police officer in the city. Stovey died at the age of 80 in New Bedford, and is interred at Oak Grove Cemetery.

The Nineteenth Century Committee of the Society for American Baseball Research named Stovey the Overlooked 19th Century Baseball Legend for 2011 — a 19th-century player, manager, executive or other baseball personality not yet inducted into the National Baseball Hall of Fame in Cooperstown, New York.

== See also ==
- List of Major League Baseball career runs scored leaders
- List of Major League Baseball career triples leaders
- List of Major League Baseball career stolen bases leaders
- List of Major League Baseball annual home run leaders
- List of Major League Baseball annual runs batted in leaders
- List of Major League Baseball annual runs scored leaders
- List of Major League Baseball annual doubles leaders
- List of Major League Baseball annual triples leaders
- List of Major League Baseball players to hit for the cycle
- List of Major League Baseball player-managers

Achievements
Preceded by Oscar Walker	American Association Home Run Champion; 1883	Succeeded by Long John Reilly
Preceded by Long John Reilly	American Association Home Run Champion; 1885	Succeeded by Bid McPhee
Preceded by Long John Reilly	American Association Home Run Champion; 1889 (with Bug Holliday)	Succeeded by Count Campau
Preceded by Charley Jones	Career home run record holder 1885–1886	Succeeded by Dan Brouthers
Preceded by Dan Brouthers	Career home run record holder 1889–1894	Succeeded by Roger Connor
Preceded by Charley Jones	Single season home run record holder 1883–1884	Succeeded by Ned Williamson
Preceded by Bid McPhee	Hitting for the cycle May 15, 1888	Succeeded by Sam Barkley

Sporting positions
Preceded by Mike Dorgan	Worcester Worcesters Manager; 1881	Succeeded by Freeman Brown
Preceded by Lon Knight	Philadelphia Athletics (AA) Manager; 1885	Succeeded by Lew Simmons
