= Fred Treacey =

American baseball player

- Outfielder
- Born: c. 1847; Brooklyn, New York, U.S.
- Died: After 1876
- Batted: Unknown Threw: Right

MLB debut
- May 16, 1871, for the Chicago White Stockings

Last MLB appearance
- September 16, 1876, for the New York Mutuals

MLB statistics
- Batting average: .244
- Home runs: 7
- Runs batted in: 142
- Stats at Baseball Reference

Teams
- National Association of Base Ball Players: Excelsior of Brooklyn (1867); Brooklyn Eckfords (1869); Chicago White Stockings (1870); League player: Chicago White Stockings (1871); Philadelphia Athletics (1872); Philadelphia White Stockings (1873); Chicago White Stockings (1874); Philadelphia Centennials (1875); Philadelphia White Stockings (1875); New York Mutuals (1876)

Career highlights and awards
- National Association home run champion: 1871

Frederick S. Treacey (c. 1847, Brooklyn – After 1876) was an American professional baseball player who played outfield in the National Association and National League from 1871 to 1876. Treacey played for the Chicago White Stockings, Athletic of Philadelphia, Philadelphia White Stockings, Philadelphia Centennials, and the New York Mutuals. His brother, Pete Treacey, was his teammate on the Mutuals in 1876.

Records
Preceded by none	Career home run record holder shared with Levi Meyerle & Lip Pike; 1871	Succeeded by Lip Pike
