= Roger Connor =

American baseball player (1857–1931)

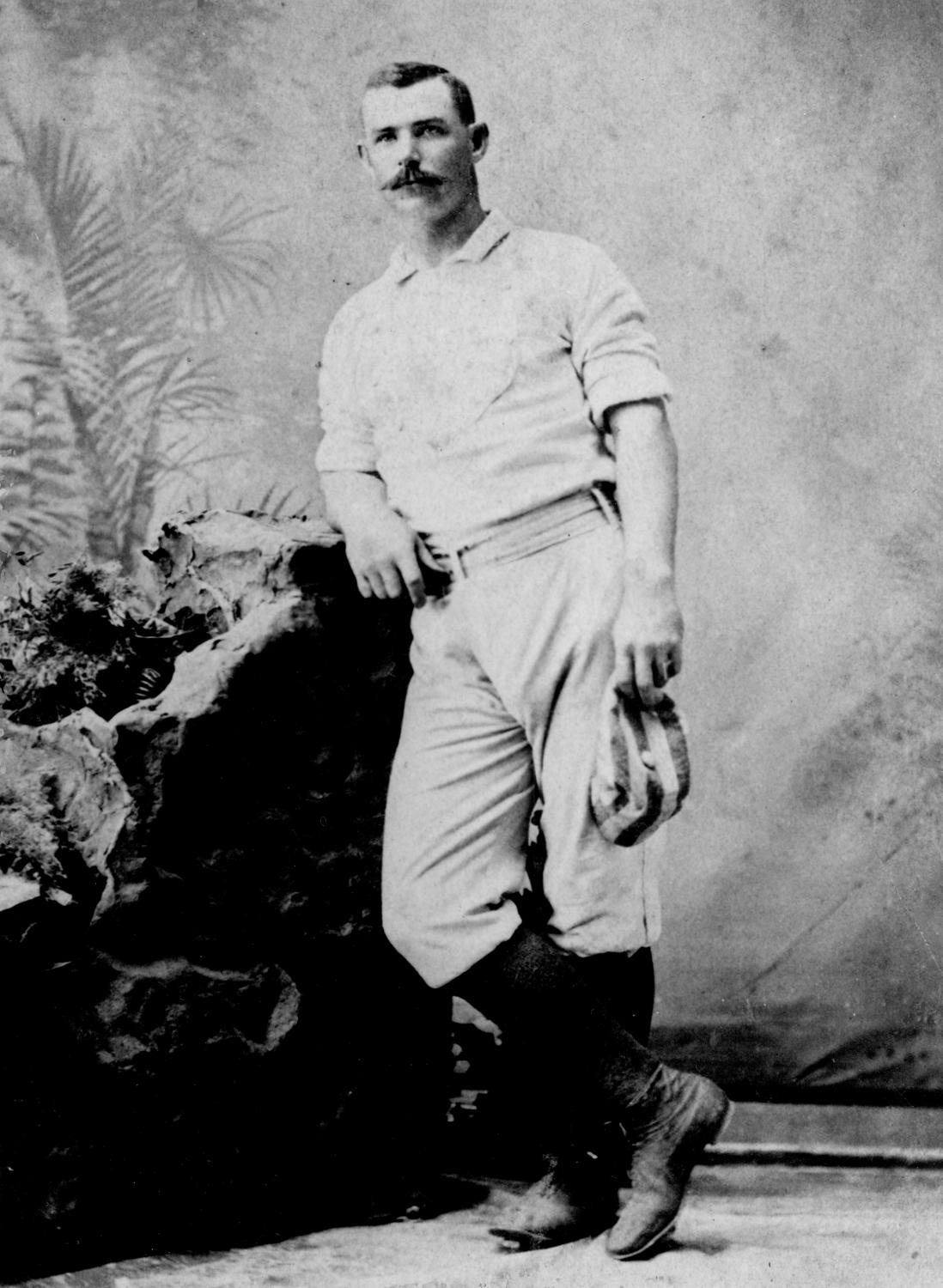
- Connor c. 1880–1882
- First baseman / Manager
- Born: July 1, 1857; Waterbury, Connecticut, U.S.
- Died: January 4, 1931 (aged 73); Waterbury, Connecticut, U.S.
- Batted: Switch Threw: Left

MLB debut
- May 1, 1880, for the Troy Trojans

Last MLB appearance
- May 18, 1897, for the St. Louis Browns

MLB statistics
- Batting average: .317
- Hits: 2,467
- Home runs: 138
- Runs batted in: 1,322
- Stats at Baseball Reference
- Managerial record at Baseball Reference

Teams
- As player: Troy Trojans (1880–1882); New York Gothams / Giants (1883–1889); New York Giants (PL) (1890); New York Giants (1891); Philadelphia Phillies (1892); New York Giants (1893–1894); St. Louis Browns (1894–1897); As manager: St. Louis Browns (1896)

Career highlights and awards
- 2× NL champion (1888, 1889); NL batting champion (1885); NL RBI leader (1889)

Member of the National

Baseball Hall of Fame
- Induction: 1976
- Election method: Veterans Committee

Roger Connor (July 1, 1857 – January 4, 1931) was an American 19th-century Major League Baseball (MLB) player. He played for several teams, but his longest tenure was in New York, where he was responsible for the New York Gothams becoming known as the Giants. He was the player whom Babe Ruth succeeded as the all-time career home run champion. Connor hit 138 home runs during his 18-year career, and his career home run record stood for 23 years after his retirement in 1897. He was one of just seven players with 2,000 hits when he retired.

Connor owned and managed minor league baseball teams after his playing days. He was elected to the Baseball Hall of Fame by its Veterans Committee in 1976. Largely forgotten after his retirement, Connor was buried in an unmarked grave until a group of citizens raised money for a grave marker in 2001.

== Early life ==
Connor was born in Waterbury, Connecticut. He was the son of Irish immigrants Mortimer Connor and Catherine Sullivan Connor. His father had arrived in the United States only five years before Roger's birth. The family lived in the Irish section of Waterbury, known as the Abrigador district, which was separated from the rest of the city by a large granite hill. Connor was the third of eleven children born to the family, though two did not survive childhood. His younger brother, Joe, also played in the majors over several seasons from 1895 to 1905. Connor left school around age 12 to work with his father at the local brass works.

Connor entered professional baseball with the Waterbury Monitors of the Eastern League in 1876. Though he was left-handed, Connor was initially a third baseman; in early baseball, left-handed third basemen were more common than they are in modern baseball. In 1878 he would transfer to the minor league Holyoke Shamrocks, where he became known for hitting home runs across the field into the Connecticut River. This so impressed Springfield baseball boss Bob Ferguson that he signed Connor onto the National League (NL) Troy Trojans when he bought them out in 1880.

== MLB playing career ==
=== Early years (1880–1889) ===
In Connor's first year with the Troy Trojans, he teamed with future Hall of Fame players Dan Brouthers, Buck Ewing, Tim Keefe and Mickey Welch, all of whom were just starting their careers. Also on that 1880 Trojans team, though much older, was player-manager Bob "Death to Flying Things" Ferguson. Though Connor, Ferguson and Welch were regularly in the lineup, the other future stars each played in only a handful of the team's 83 games that season. The team finished in fourth place with a 41–42 win–loss record. Connor committed 60 errors in 83 games and sustained a shoulder injury, prompting a position change to first baseman for 1881.

He later played for the New York Gothams, and, due to his great stature, gave that team the enduring nickname "Giants". Connor hit baseball's first grand slam on September 10, 1881, at Riverfront Park in Rensselaer, New York. His grand slam came with two outs and his team down three runs in the bottom of the ninth inning, a situation known today as a walk-off home run. George Vecsey, in The New York Times wrote: "Roger Connor was a complete player — a deft first baseman and an agile base runner who hit 233 triples and stole 244 bases despite his size (6 feet 3 inches and 200 pounds)."

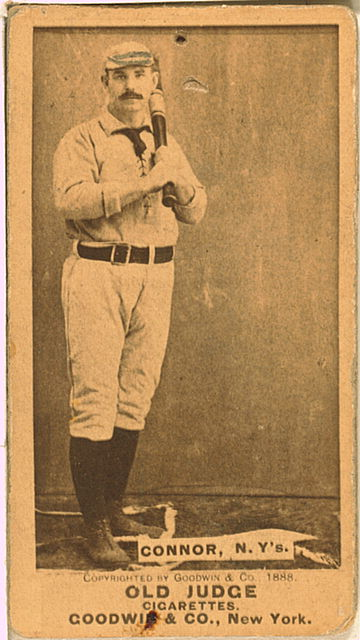
Roger Connor with the New York Gothams, circa 1887.

He led the NL with a .371 average in 1885. On September 11, 1886, Connor hit a ball completely out of the Polo Grounds, a very difficult park in which to hit home runs. He hit the pitch from Boston's Old Hoss Radbourn over the right field fence and onto 112th Street. The New York Times reported of the feat, "He met it squarely and it soared up with the speed of a carrier pigeon. All eyes were turned on the tiny sphere as it soared over the head of Charlie Buffinton in right field." A group of fans with the New York Stock Exchange took up a collection for Connor and bought him a $500 gold watch in honor of the home run.

=== Players' League (1890) ===
Another New York baseball team, also known as the Giants, emerged with the founding of the Players' League (PL) in 1890. Several players from the NL team left for the new league's Giants team, including future Hall of Famers Connor, Keefe, Jim O'Rourke and Hank O'Day. In 123 games, Connor registered 169 hits, a .349 batting average, 14 home runs, 103 runs batted in (RBI) and 22 stolen bases. His home run total led the league and it represented the only major league single-season home run title that he won. Connor experimented with some changes to his batting style that year. He hit more balls to the opposite field and he sometimes batted right-handed, though he did not have much success from the right side.

Though Connor had success in his season with the PL, the league struggled. Some of the teams ran into financial difficulties. National League teams rescheduled many of their games to conflict with PL games in the same cities, and a high number of PL games were cancelled late in the season due to rainouts. Connor was optimistic that the league would be successful in 1891, but it officially broke up that January.

=== Later career (1891–1897) ===
Returning to the NL Giants for a season in 1891, Connor hit .294. In the offseason before 1892, Connor signed with the Philadelphia Athletics. The team broke up shortly after Connor signed, and his contract was awarded to the Philadelphia Phillies for that year. He returned to the Giants in 1893, raising his average to .322 and hitting 11 home runs. During the 1894 season, the Giants looked toward the team's youth and Connor lost his starting position to Jack Doyle. He was released that year and picked up by the St. Louis Browns. The next year, his brother Joe Connor made his major league debut with the same team. Joe played two games with St. Louis before being sent back down to the minor leagues. That year's St. Louis team finished with a 39–92 record, 48 1/2 games out of first place.

Connor was released by the Browns in May 1897 after starting the season with a .227 batting average. His major league playing career was over. While a major league player, Connor was regularly among the league leaders in batting average and home runs. Connor's career mark of 138 was a benchmark not surpassed until 1921 by Babe Ruth. He finished his career with a .317 batting average. Connor finished in the top ten in batting average ten times, all between 1880 and 1891. Over an 18-year career, Connor finished in the top ten for doubles ten times, finished in the top three for triples seven times and remains fifth all-time in triples with 233. He was also the first player to reach 1,000 career walks. He also established his power credentials by finishing in the top ten in RBI ten times and top ten in homers twelve times.

== Personal life ==
In 1886, Connor and his wife Angeline had a daughter named Lulu. She died as an infant. Connor interpreted the baby's death as God's punishment for marrying Angeline, who was not Catholic. Angeline had secretly begun receiving Catholic education and was planning to surprise Connor by getting baptized on the day that Lulu would have turned a year old. The couple later adopted a girl named Cecelia from a Catholic orphanage in New York City.

Roger and Angeline Connor lived in Waterbury, Connecticut, for many years, even while Roger played in New York. Every winter, a banquet was held in Waterbury in Connor's honor. Near the end of the 19th century, Angeline gave Roger a weather vane which had been constructed from two of his baseball bats. The weather vane served as a well-known landmark in Waterbury even after the couple moved away.

== Later life ==
=== Minor league baseball ===
Connor signed with the Fall River Indians of the New England League in June 1897. Connor attracted some attention by wearing eyeglasses on the field. He hit cleanup, played first base and was popular among fans. In 1898, Connor moved back to his hometown of Waterbury and purchased the local minor league team. He served as president, manager and played first base on the side. Connor's wife, Angeline, kept the team's books and his daughter helped by collecting tickets. Joe Connor was the team's catcher; he later returned to the major leagues for several seasons. After the 1899 season, Connor expressed satisfaction with his Waterbury team, saying that the team played well and did not lose money despite not getting strong attendance numbers at their games.

In 1901, Connor became interested in purchasing the minor league franchise in Hartford, Connecticut. The team had been dropped from the Eastern League and had suffered financial losses related to traveling as far away as Canada for games. Connor proposed that he might purchase the team and attempt to have it admitted to the Connecticut State League, decreasing its travel requirements. However, upon selling the Waterbury club at the end of that season, he bought the Springfield Ponies franchise in the same league.

=== Retirement from baseball ===
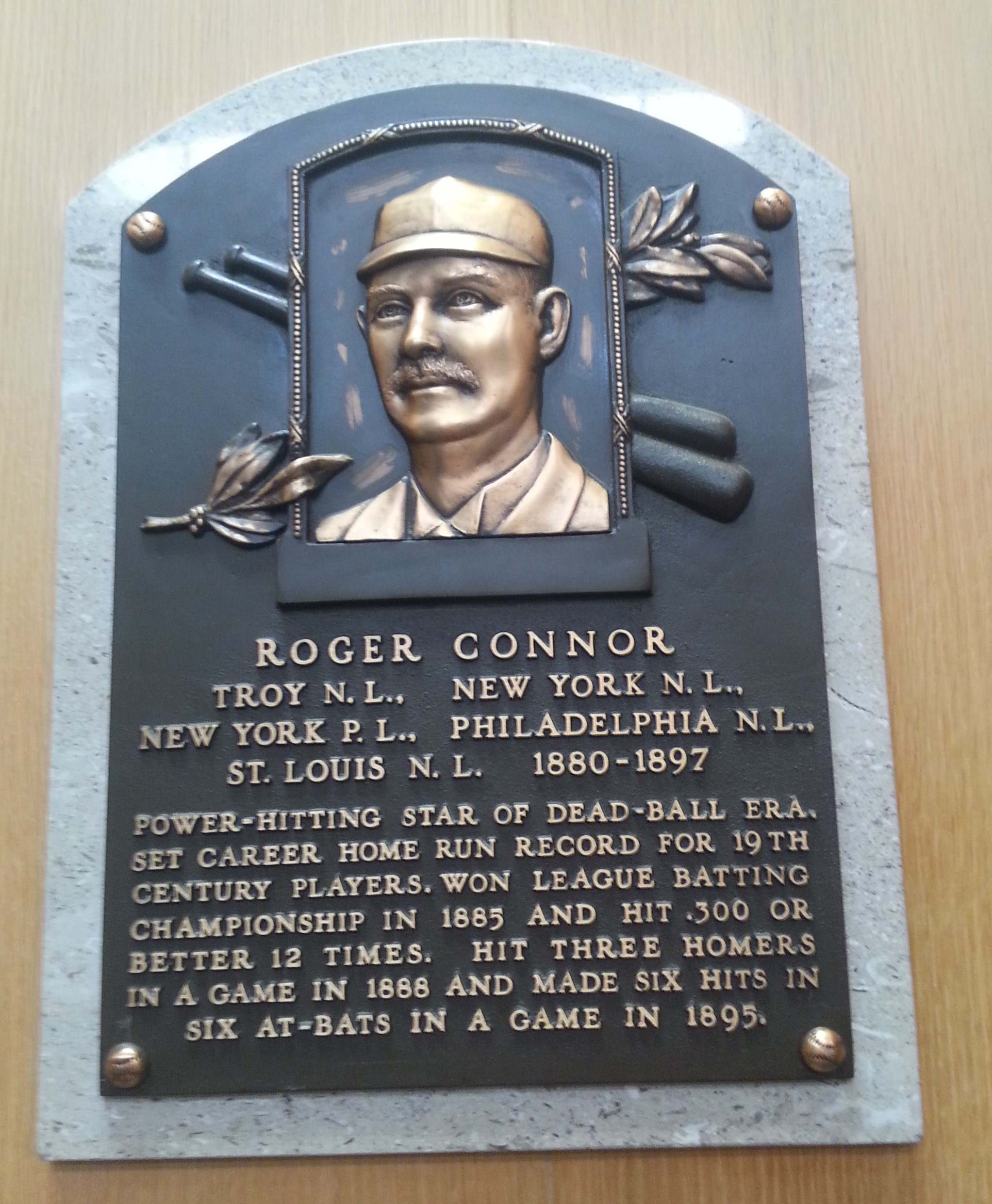
Plaque of Roger Connor at the Baseball Hall of Fame

In September 1903, Connor announced his retirement from baseball and placed his team up for sale. He had made a similar statement the year before and apparently on a frequent basis before that. In June 1902, the local newspaper said, "Roger bobs up every summer and makes his farewell to the baseball public." His 1903 retirement was earnest though; he attended a 1904 Springfield-Norwich game as a retired spectator.

Connor worked as a school inspector in Waterbury until 1920. He lived to see his career home run record bested by Babe Ruth, although if it was celebrated, it might have been on the wrong day. At one time, Connor's record was thought to be 131, per the Sporting News book Daguerreotypes. As late as the 1980s, in the MacMillan Baseball Encyclopedia, it was thought to be 136. However, John Tattersall's 1975 Home Run Handbook, a publication of the Society for American Baseball Research (SABR), credited Connor with 138. Both MLB.com and the independent Baseball-Reference.com now consider Connor's total to be 138.

=== Death ===
Connor died on January 4, 1931, following a lengthy stomach illness, at the age of 73. A news article after his death said his "likeable personality and his colorful action made him an idol."

He was interred in an unmarked grave at St. Joseph's Cemetery in Waterbury.

Decades after his death, Waterbury citizens, as well as through donations from baseball fans, raised enough money to purchase a headstone for his grave, which was dedicated in a 2001 ceremony.

Connor was inducted into the Baseball Hall of Fame in 1976. Baseball Hall of Fame umpire Bill Klem had long campaigned on behalf of Connor's inclusion to the Hall of Fame.

== See also ==
- List of Major League Baseball career hits leaders
- List of Major League Baseball career doubles leaders
- List of Major League Baseball career triples leaders
- List of Major League Baseball career runs scored leaders
- List of Major League Baseball career runs batted in leaders
- List of Major League Baseball career stolen bases leaders
- List of Major League Baseball batting champions
- List of Major League Baseball annual doubles leaders
- List of Major League Baseball annual triples leaders
- List of Major League Baseball annual runs batted in leaders
- List of Major League Baseball players to hit for the cycle
- List of Major League Baseball single-game hits leaders
- List of Major League Baseball triples records
- List of Major League Baseball ultimate grand slams
- List of Major League Baseball player-managers
- List of St. Louis Cardinals team records

== Notes ==
Records
Preceded by Harry Stovey	Career home run record holder 1895–1920	Succeeded by Babe Ruth
Achievements
Preceded by Jumbo Davis	Hitting for the cycle July 21, 1890	Succeeded by Oyster Burns
