= Levi Meyerle =

American baseball player (1849–1921)

- Third baseman / Second baseman / Outfielder
- Born: July 1849; Philadelphia, Pennsylvania, US
- Died: November 4, 1921 (aged 72); Philadelphia, Pennsylvania, US
- Batted: Right Threw: Right

MLB debut
- May 20, 1871, for the Athletic of Philadelphia

Last MLB appearance
- April 26, 1884, for the Philadelphia Keystones

MLB statistics
- Batting average: .356
- Home runs: 10
- Runs batted in: 278
- Stats at Baseball Reference

Teams
- National Association of Base Ball Players: Geary of Philadelphia (1867–1868); Philadelphia Athletics (1869); Chicago White Stockings (1870); League player: Philadelphia Athletics (1871–1872); Philadelphia White Stockings (1873); Chicago White Stockings (1874); Philadelphia White Stockings (1875); Philadelphia Athletics (1876); Cincinnati Reds (1877); Philadelphia Keystones (1884)

Career highlights and awards
- National Association batting champion: 1871, 1874; National Association home run champion: 1871; MLB records: Single-season Batting average: .492 (1871)

Levi Samuel Meyerle (July 1849 – November 4, 1921) was an American professional baseball third baseman, second baseman and outfielder who played for eight seasons in organized professional league play. During his career he played for the Philadelphia Athletics of the National Association, Cincinnati Reds and Chicago White Stockings of the National League and Keystones of Philadelphia of the Union Association.

== National Association career ==
On May 20, 1871, Meyerle began his organized professional league career in the National Association, starting at third base for the Philadelphia Athletics of the National Association. Meyerle had an impressive season, placing first in the league with a .492 batting average, a .500 on-base percentage, and a .700 slugging percentage. He also tied for first in home runs and total bases, finished second in hits, and placed third in runs batted in, en route to a first-place finish for Philadelphia. Meyerle's .492 average established a record for major league play—that is, if the National Association is considered a major league. The MLB does not recognize statistics from the NA; many historians do, however. His fielding average in that historic 1871 season was .646.

In 1872, he saw extensive action in the outfield, played 26 games in right field and only one at third base. Before the 1873 season, he was traded to the Philadelphia White Stockings, where he played 48 games at third base and one at shortstop. Meyerle also recorded a career high 58 RBIs in 1873.

Meyerle played the 1874 season with the Chicago White Stockings of the National Association. For Chicago, Meyerle had the only 100-hit season of his career and recorded his highest batting average (.394) since his .492 mark in the 1871 season. He returned to the Philadelphia Whites in 1875, hitting .316 with 1 home run and 54 RBI in 68 games. For the 1876 season, he rejoined the Philadelphia Athletics in their first season in the newly formed National League. Meyerle played at third base, second base, right field, and pitcher and put up a .340 batting average. After the Philadelphia club was expelled from the league following the 1876 season, Meyerle signed on with the Cincinnati Reds. He played only 27 games for Cincinnati, and didn't return to the major leagues for the 1878 season. After 6 years out of major league baseball, Meyerle appeared in three games for the Philadelphia Keystones in 1884. His final game was on April 26, 1884.

Known as "Long Levi" in his playing days, Meyerle finished his career with some stellar numbers, hitting .356 for his career with 513 hits, 86 doubles, and 279 RBI in 307 games over 8 seasons. He only hit under .300 once in his career. Meyerle also pitched three games in his career, once with the Athletics of the National Association in 1871, and twice with the Athletics of the NL in 1876. He went 0–2 with a 6.25 ERA in two starts and one relief appearance.

== Personal life ==
Meyerle died in Philadelphia in 1921, and is interred at its Oakland Cemetery.

Records
Preceded by none	Career home run record holder shared with Fred Treacey & Lip Pike; 1871	Succeeded by Lip Pike
