= Eddie Mathews =

American baseball player and manager (1931–2001)

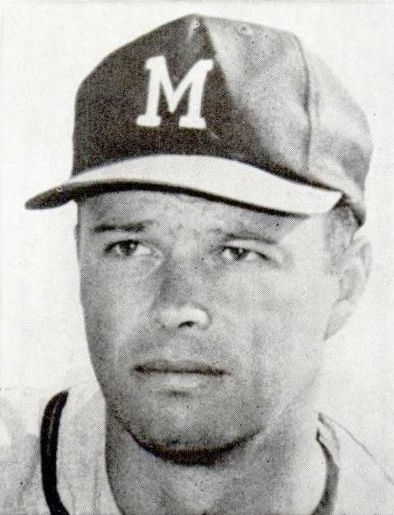
- Mathews in 1963
- Third baseman / Manager
- Born: October 13, 1931; Texarkana, Texas, U.S.
- Died: February 18, 2001 (aged 69); La Jolla, California, U.S.
- Batted: Left Threw: Right

MLB debut
- April 15, 1952, for the Boston Braves

Last MLB appearance
- September 27, 1968, for the Detroit Tigers

MLB statistics
- Batting average: .271
- Hits: 2,315
- Home runs: 512
- Runs batted in: 1,453
- Managerial record: 149–161
- Winning %: .481
- Stats at Baseball Reference

Teams
- As player: Boston / Milwaukee / Atlanta Braves (1952–1966); Houston Astros (1967); Detroit Tigers (1967–1968); As manager: Atlanta Braves (1972–1974); As coach: Atlanta Braves (1971–1972)

Career highlights and awards
- 12× All-Star (1953, 1955–1961², 1962²); 2× World Series champion (1957, 1968); 2× NL home run leader (1953, 1959); Atlanta Braves No. 41 retired; Braves Hall of Fame; American Family Field Walk of Fame

Member of the National

Baseball Hall of Fame
- Induction: 1978
- Vote: 79.4% (fifth ballot)

Edwin Lee Mathews (October 13, 1931 – February 18, 2001) was an American professional baseball third baseman. He played in Major League Baseball (MLB) for 17 seasons for the Boston / Milwaukee / Atlanta Braves (1952–1966); Houston Astros (1967) and Detroit Tigers (1967–68). Inducted into the National Baseball Hall of Fame in 1978, he is the only player to have represented the Braves in all three of the cities they have called home. He played 1,944 games for the Braves during their 13-season tenure in Milwaukee—the prime of Mathews's career. He won two World Series rings, with the Braves in 1957 and with the Tigers in 1968 during Mathews's final season.

Mathews is regarded as one of the best third basemen ever to play the game. He was an All-Star for nine seasons. He won the National League (NL) home run title in 1953 and 1959 and was the NL Most Valuable Player runner-up both of those seasons. He hit 512 home runs during his major league career. Mathews coached for the Atlanta Braves in 1971, and he was the team's manager from 1972 to 1974. Later, he was a scout and coach for the Texas Rangers, Milwaukee Brewers, and Oakland Athletics.

== Early years ==
Mathews was born in Texarkana, Texas. He was six years old when his family moved to Santa Barbara, California. The Santa Barbara High School baseball field, where he developed into a star high school baseball player, is named after him. Mathews was signed by the Boston Braves in 1949. He played 63 games that year for the Class D High Point-Thomasville Hi-Toms, where he hit 17 home runs and earned a .363 batting average. The next year he hit 32 home runs for the Class AA Atlanta Crackers.

== MLB career ==
=== Boston, Milwaukee, and Atlanta Braves ===
After splitting 1951 between the Crackers and Triple-A Milwaukee Brewers, Mathews made the Braves' major league roster out of spring training in 1952. He hit 25 home runs, including three in one game versus Brooklyn on September 27. In 1953, the Braves moved to Milwaukee where he batted .302 and posted career highs of 47 home runs and 135 RBIs. For nine straight seasons he hit at least 30 home runs, including leading the National League twice (1953, 1959).

Mathews, along with catcher Wes Westrum and umpire Augie Donatelli, appears on the first issue of Sports Illustrated, August 1954

As one of 1954's superstars in American sports, Mathews was chosen for the cover of the first-ever issue of Sports Illustrated magazine. Around this time, Ty Cobb said of Mathews: "I've only known three or four perfect swings in my time. This lad has one of them." Mathews was a powerful pull hitter, and for many years of his career teams would implement the "Mathews shift" when he came to bat. The second baseman would shift well to his left, toward first base, and the shortstop would come to the second base side of the bag, leaving a gaping hole between second and third base.

The Braves won the 1957 National League championship. In the World Series, Mathews hit a game-winning home run in the tenth inning of game four. The Braves went on to defeat the New York Yankees in seven games. Mathews made the final out of the Series, a forceout of Gil McDougald on Moose Skowron's hard-hit grounder.

Mathews was regarded as one of the strongest power hitters of his time, often being compared to American League contemporary Mickey Mantle, in terms of power hitting strength. Hall of Fame teammate Warren Spahn once said of the two: "Mathews is just as strong as Mantle. They don't hit the same – Mantle gets all of his weight into his swing; Mathews uses his wrists more." Spahn's comment on Mathews's use of his wrists was in reference to his unique swing, as believed by many to be one of the more graceful swings in baseball history. Pitcher Sal Maglie noticed, however, that Mathews had a tendency to chase "the low curve on the three-and-two pitch." Mathews is the only player to play for the Braves in Boston, Milwaukee, and Atlanta. By the Braves' first season in Atlanta, Mathews was the last Boston Brave still on an active roster.

Mathews is also one of just two players to homer with a teammate in the same game at least 50 times with two different teammates. He did this with Henry Aaron 75 times and with Joe Adcock 56 times. Willie Mays is the other, with Willie McCovey (68) and Orlando Cepeda (50), to do it.

Between 1954 and 1966, he and Braves teammate Hank Aaron hit 863 home runs (Aaron 442, Mathews 421), moving ahead of the Yankees duo of Babe Ruth and Lou Gehrig as the all-time leaders in major league history.

=== Houston Astros and Detroit Tigers ===
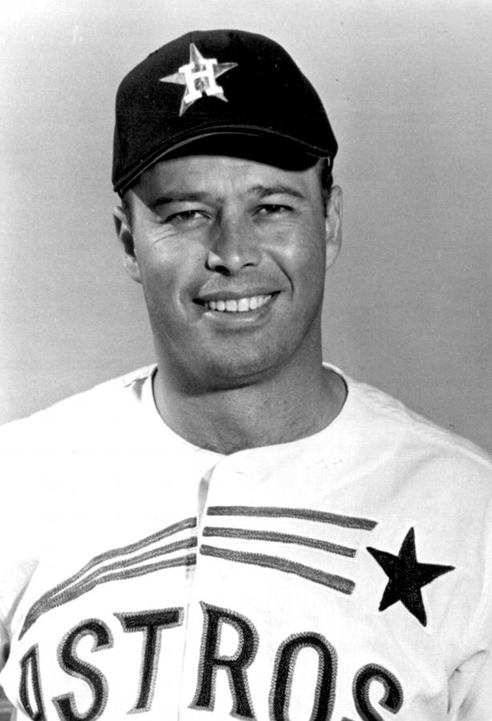
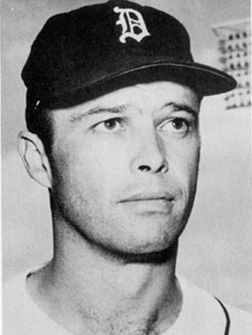
Matthews (left) with the Astros in 1966; Matthews (right) in 1968 with the Tigers

The Braves traded Mathews, Arnold Umbach, and a player to be named later to the Houston Astros for Dave Nicholson and Bob Bruce after the 1966 season. He had spent his entire adult life up to that point with the Braves franchise. In 1967, Mathews became the seventh player to hit 500 career home runs, becoming a member of the 500 home run club on July 14 coming off pitcher Juan Marichal of the San Francisco Giants at Candlestick Park. He was the second National Leaguer to reach that milestone, behind only Ott.

After just 101 games in Houston, Mathews was traded again, this time from the Astros to the Detroit Tigers, who were in the midst of a heated pennant race with the Boston Red Sox.

Mathews would play his final Major League season in Detroit in 1968, as the Tigers would win the American League pennant for the first time since 1945 and advanced to the World Series. In his first postseason play in ten years, Matthews appeared as a pinch-hitter in the 8th inning in Game 1 versus the St. Louis Cardinals, where he struck out. He played the entire Game 4 at third base, logging a hit and a walk in the loss, which ended up being his final game as a major league player; ultimately, the Tigers would win the series in seven games.

Upon his retirement, he was sixth in all-time home runs with 512. At the time, his 503 home runs in the National League were second in the Senior Circuit's history, behind only Ott. Over his career, he was named to the All-Star team twelve times (MLB held two All-Star Games from 1959 through 1962), played in three World Series, and drove in 100 or more runs five times. He never won an MVP award (finishing second twice, behind Roy Campanella in 1953 and behind Ernie Banks in 1959), although he did win the NL Player of the Month award in September 1959 (.303, 11 HR, 25 RBI).

=== Career statistics ===
In 2391 games over 17 seasons, Mathews posted a .271 batting average (2315-for-8537) with 1509 runs, 354 doubles, 72 triples, 512 home runs, 1453 RBI, 68 stolen bases, 1444 bases on balls, .376 on-base percentage and .509 slugging percentage. He finished his career with a .959 fielding percentage playing primarily at third base but also at first base and left field. In 16 World Series games, he batted .200 (10-for-50) with 7 runs, 5 doubles, 1 home run, 7 RBI, 1 stolen base and 15 walks.

=== Coaching and managing ===
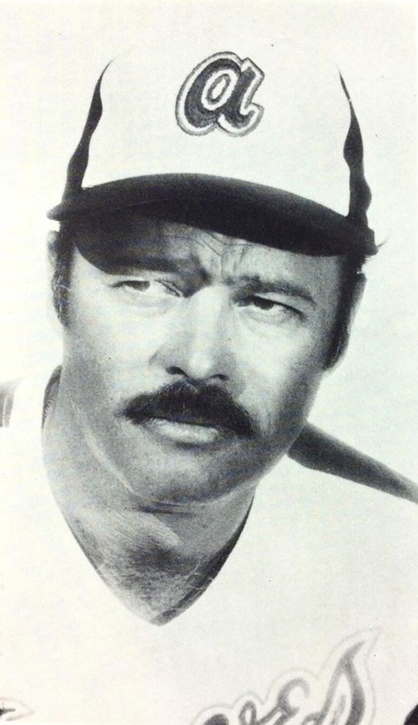
1974 photocard of Matthews as manager of the Atlanta Braves

In 1971, Mathews became a coach, and then in the midseason of 1972, manager of the Atlanta Braves. The Braves were 47–57 under Lum Harris and in fourth place in the National League West Division when Mathews took command on August 7. The 1972 Braves finished 23–27 under Mathews as manager, ending up 25 games behind the Cincinnati Reds. The 1973 Braves then finished fifth (76–85), 221/2 games out of first place.

Mathews was the Braves' manager when Hank Aaron hit his 715th home run on April 8, 1974. But on July 21, 1974, Mathews was fired when the team went into a slump and fell into fourth place with a 50–49 record. Aaron and Darrell Evans both criticized the decision to terminate Mathews. Evans said that Mathews was a friend and Aaron said that the decision was "a blow to me." Mathews stated the Braves indicated there would be a job for him within the organization, but he said he was not sure what he would do next. The Braves went 149–161 (.481) during Mathews' time at the helm.

== After retirement ==
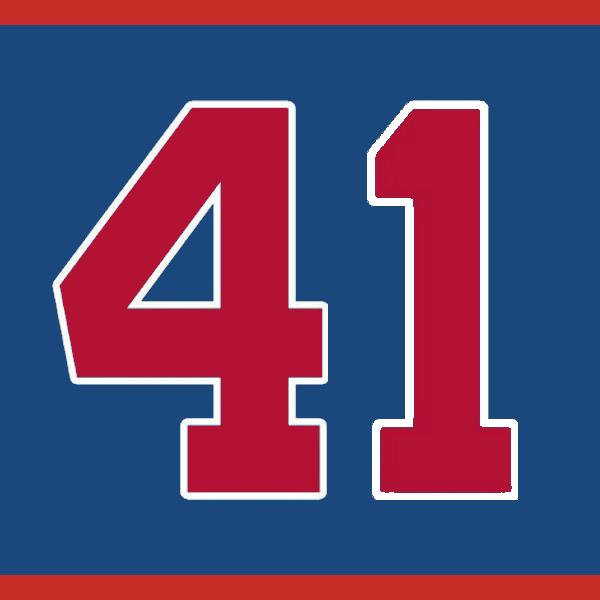
Eddie Mathews's number 41 was retired by the Atlanta Braves in 1969.

Mathews was elected to the Wisconsin Athletic Hall of Fame in 1976.

In 1978, Mathews was elected to the National Baseball Hall of Fame.

In 1982, Mathews was a minor league instructor for the Oakland Athletics when a spot was found on his lung. He was ultimately admitted to a hospital to investigate it, where doctors ruled out cancer, but he was diagnosed with tuberculosis, treated then returned to his work with the Oakland organization.

In 1999, The Sporting News ranked Mathews 63 on their list of 100, "Baseball's Greatest Players". He was also nominated that year as a finalist for the Major League Baseball All-Century Team. In 2020, The Athletic ranked Mathews at number 46 on its "Baseball 100" list, complied by sportswriter Joe Posnanski.

== Personal life ==
Mathews was married to Virjean Lauby in 1954 and they divorced in 1970. He was married and divorced a second time, then married Elizabeth Busch Burke, daughter of brewing executive Gussie Busch, in 1977.

Sportswriter Bob Wolf of the Milwaukee Journal indicated that Mathews' election to the Baseball Hall of Fame may have been delayed because of his cool relationship with the media. Mathews seemed to resent the intrusion of reporters in his personal life, especially early in his career. He gestured with his fist at a reporter when he was in court on charges of reckless driving. He was angered by the presence of the media at his 1954 wedding ceremony at a county clerk's office.

== Death ==
In February 2001, Mathews died from complications of pneumonia in La Jolla in San Diego, California, and was buried in Santa Barbara Cemetery. Later that year during the baseball season, the Atlanta Braves honored Mathews with the placement of patches bearing his retired uniform number, 41, on their jerseys.

== See also ==
- List of Major League Baseball annual home run leaders
- List of Major League Baseball career home run leaders
- List of Major League Baseball career hits leaders
- List of Major League Baseball career runs scored leaders
- List of Major League Baseball career runs batted in leaders
- List of Major League Baseball career total bases leaders
- List of Major League Baseball home run records
- List of Major League Baseball retired numbers

Awards and achievements
Preceded by Vern Law & Willie McCovey	Major League Player of the Month; September 1959	Succeeded by Roberto Clemente
