= Dan Brouthers =

American baseball player (1858–1932)

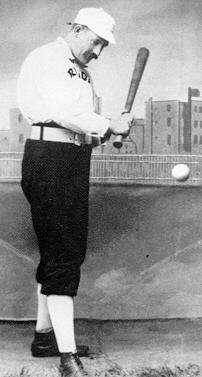
- Brouthers in 1887
- First baseman
- Born: May 8, 1858; Sylvan Lake, New York, U.S.
- Died: August 2, 1932 (aged 74); East Orange, New Jersey, U.S.
- Batted: Left Threw: Left

MLB debut
- June 23, 1879, for the Troy Trojans

Last MLB appearance
- October 4, 1904, for the New York Giants

MLB statistics
- Batting average: .342
- Hits: 2,296
- Home runs: 106
- Runs batted in: 1,296
- Stats at Baseball Reference

Teams
- Troy Trojans (1879–1880); Buffalo Bisons (1881–1885); Detroit Wolverines (1886–1888); Boston Beaneaters (1889); Boston Reds (1890–1891); Brooklyn Grooms (1892–1893); Baltimore Orioles (1894–1895); Louisville Colonels (1895); Philadelphia Phillies (1896); New York Giants (1904)

Career highlights and awards
- 4× NL batting champion (1882, 1883, 1889, 1892); 2× NL home run leader (1881, 1886); 2× NL RBI leader (1883, 1892)

Member of the National

Baseball Hall of Fame
- Induction: 1945
- Election method: Old-Timers Committee

Dennis Joseph "Dan" Brouthers (/ˈbruːθərz/; May 8, 1858 – August 2, 1932) was an American first baseman in Major League Baseball whose career spanned the period from 1879 to 1896, with a brief return in 1904. Nicknamed "Big Dan" for his size, he was 6 feet 2 inches (1.88 m) and weighed 207 pounds (94 kg), which was large by 19th-century standards.

Recognized as the first great slugger in baseball history, and among the greatest sluggers of his era, he briefly held the career home run record from 1887 to 1889, with his final total of 106 tying for the fourth most of the 19th century. His career slugging percentage of .520 remained the Major League record until Babe Ruth overtook him in the 1920s. At the time of his initial retirement, he also ranked second in career triples (205), and third in runs batted in (1,296) and hits.

A dominant hitter during the prime of his career, he led (or was in the top of) the league in most offensive categories, including batting average, runs scored, runs batted in (RBI), on-base percentage and hits. He won five batting titles – the most of any player in the 19th century – and his career .342 batting average ranks 12th all-time. Brouthers is one of only 31 players in baseball history who have appeared in Major League games in four decades.

He was also an active players' union member, and was elected vice president of the Brotherhood of Professional Base Ball Players. In 1945, Brouthers was elected to the National Baseball Hall of Fame. He holds the record with Deacon White for most franchises played for (10) by a Hall-of-Famer.

== Early life ==
Brouthers was born in Sylvan Lake, New York, to Michael and Annie Brooder, Catholic immigrants from Ireland; upon arriving in New York, Michael Brooder had been recruited to Dutchess County to work in open pit iron mines in the town of Beekman. Brouthers may have been named after Saint Denis, as a local Catholic church by that name was founded in the same year. Brouthers had siblings named Martin, Ellen, and Margaret. The spelling of the family's name gradually shifted from Brooder to Bruder to Brouthers by 1880. The family eventually moved to the nearby hamlet of Fishkill Plains before settling in the village of Wappingers Falls where Michael found safer work at a textile printing mill.

Brouthers played organized baseball beginning in childhood, from playing in the local sandlots to the semi-professional Actives of Wappingers Falls. On July 7, 1877, while running the bases, he collided at home plate with a catcher, named Johnny Quigley, of the Clippers of Harlem. Quigley was knocked unconscious, having suffered a traumatic head injury, and later died from these injuries on August 12. The 19-year-old Brouthers was cleared of any wrongdoing by the authorities.

== Major League career ==
=== Troy ===
Brouthers made his Major League debut on June 23, 1879, for the Troy Trojans, and contributed a single in a come-from-behind victory against the Syracuse Stars. Although he was a first baseman, he was called upon to pitch that season with the Trojans in three games, one of which was on August 21 against Tommy Bond and the Boston Red Caps. Brouthers lost 16–0, and within two weeks he was released from the club. He hit .274 that first season, with four home runs, and had 17 RBIs in 39 games played.

After his release, Brouthers played for a minor league team in Rochester, New York, and on one occasion in 1880, he hit a game-winning home run in an exhibition game versus the Buffalo Bisons, off future Hall of Fame pitcher Pud Galvin. He hit well enough in the minors to get another shot with the Trojans, which lasted just three games when he had only two hits in 12 at bats, and he was released again.

=== Buffalo ===
Brouthers got his first chance to be an everyday player in 1881, when he was signed by the Bisons, the team that he did well against the previous year. That season he batted .319, and played with them until the team folded after the 1885 season. In his first season with the Bisons, he led the National League (NL) in home runs and slugging percentage. Brouthers, along with teammates Jack Rowe, Hardy Richardson and Deacon White, became known as the "Big Four". In 1882 and 1883 he won his first two batting titles, posting .368 and .374 averages, respectively. Along with his two batting titles, during his time in Buffalo he also led the NL in slugging five times, hits and total bases twice each, and triples and RBIs once each, with his 1883 total of 97 RBIs setting a new Major League record; Cap Anson had set the previous mark of 83 the year before, and retook the record the following year with a total of 102. On July 19, 1883, Brouthers went 6-for-6 with two doubles in a 25–5 defeat of the Philadelphia Quakers.

=== Detroit and The Brotherhood ===
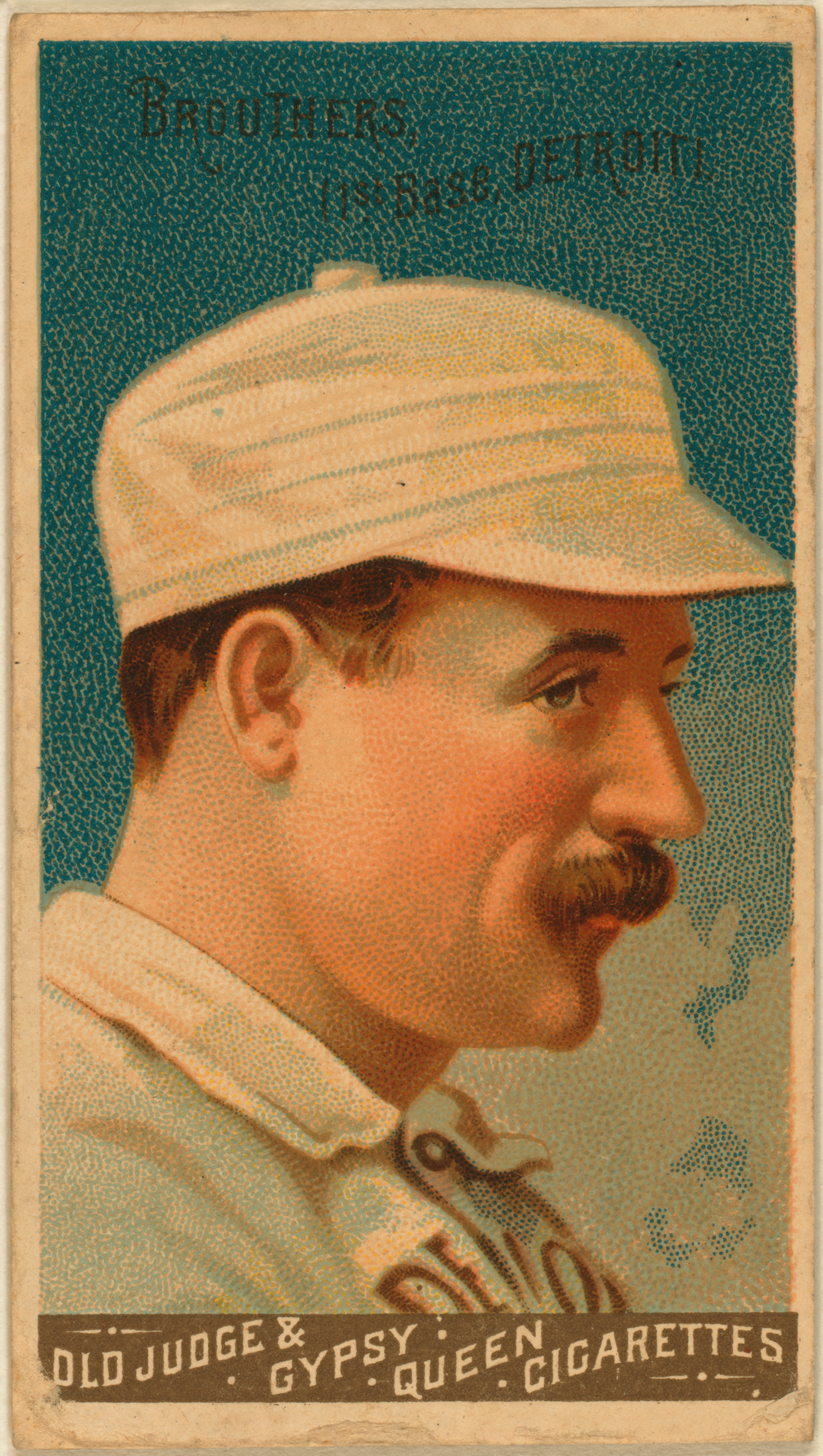
Tobacco card of Brouthers from 1888

At the end of the 1885 season, Buffalo was going through financial trouble and were forced to sell off their players, so "The Big Four" were sold to the Detroit Wolverines of the NL for US$7,000. In 1886, his first season in Detroit, he again led the league in slugging percentage, the sixth year in a row, and led the league in total bases and doubles and claimed his first home run title. He finished within the top 10 in most offensive categories, including a third-place finish in the batting race with a lofty .370 average. On September 10, 1886, Brouthers hit three home runs‚ along with a double and a single, to set the NL record with 15 total bases in one game. This mark tied the Major League record at the time, as Guy Hecker of the Louisville Colonels totaled 15 the previous month in the American Association.

The Detroit team was filled with stars from the era, including future Hall of Famers Sam Thompson and Ned Hanlon, as well as second baseman Fred Dunlap, the "Big Four", and the pitching of Lady Baldwin and Charlie Getzien. The team finished with a record of 87 wins and 36 losses, in second place behind the Chicago White Stockings by 2 1/2 games.

During the off-season, on November 11, 1886, The Executive Council of the Brotherhood of Professional Base Ball Players‚ formed in 1885 as the first organized players' union, met and re-elected John Montgomery Ward as president, and elected Brouthers as vice president.

In 1887, with the 1886 roster intact, the Wolverines finished in first place, besting the Quakers by 3 1/2 games. Brouthers batted .338, and led the league in runs scored with 153, doubles with 36, and on-base percentage, while again finishing in the top 10 in most offensive categories, including a league high (and career best) 12 home runs. The Wolverines, behind the bats of Brouthers, Thompson and Richardson, led the League in batting, runs scored and slugging, and went on to face the St. Louis Browns in a best-of-15 post-season tournament, the "World's Series". The Wolverines sealed a series championship with their eighth victory in 11 games; however, the two teams finished the series anyway, with Detroit winning 10 games to the Browns' five. Brouthers only played in one of those games, getting two hits in three at bats.

Following the season, on November 17, 1887, members of the NL officially recognized the Brotherhood and met with a Brotherhood committee that consisted of three players – Ward‚ Hanlon and Brouthers.

The 1888 Detroit team did not fare as well, finishing in fifth place with a record of 68–63, which was a full 16 games behind the first-place New York Giants. Brouthers' numbers declined as well, as he did not produce at the same level of his previous seasons. Even with the lower numbers, he still led the league in runs scored with 118, and doubles for the third year in a row. The team's decline is attributed to prolonged injuries sustained by key players, while turmoil that unfolded concerning veteran stars' salary demands, and with falling attendance numbers, the club was forced to fold at the season's end. Brouthers was then purchased by the Boston Beaneaters of the NL on October 16.

=== Boston ===
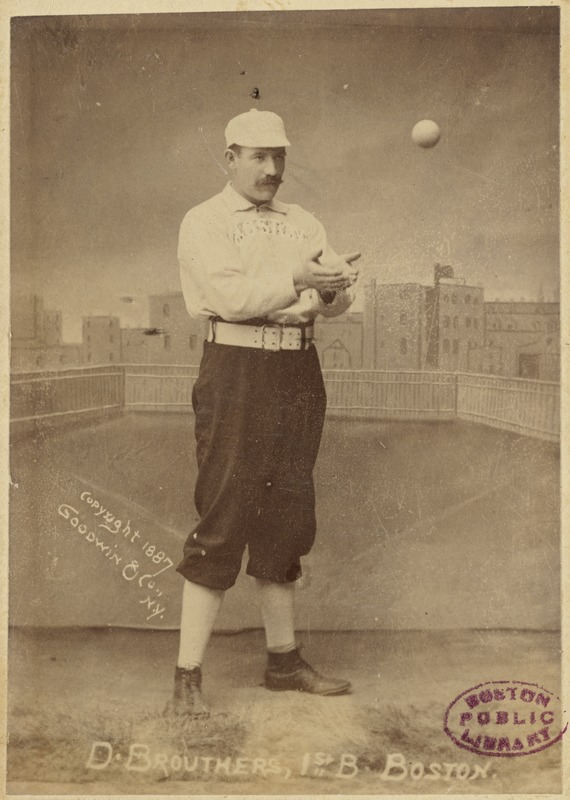
Dan Brouthers of the Boston Players League team, 1887. Michael T. "Nuf Ced" McGreevy Collection, Boston Public Library.

In 1889, his only season with the Beaneaters, he batted a league-leading .373, along with 105 runs scored and 118 runs batted in; he struck out only six times. The first strikeout occurred on June 11 against Mickey Welch of the Giants.

After the season, he – along with many Major League players – jumped to the Players' League, a league established by the Brotherhood which competed against the two other Major Leagues already in existence. Brouthers signed with the Boston Reds, and batted .330 while leading the league in on-base percentage and slugging. The Reds, behind the talents of Brouthers, Harry Stovey, Hardy Richardson, Charles Radbourn and player-manager King Kelly, finished in first place, 6 1/2 games ahead of the Brooklyn Ward's Wonders.

The Players' League lasted just the one season, and the Reds merged into the American Association, carrying many of the championship team's previous players. Again, the team won the league's championship, finishing 8 1/2 games ahead of the St. Louis Browns. Brouthers led the league in batting average (.350), on-base percentage and slugging, while finishing second in triples with 19, sixth in doubles with 26, and third in RBIs with 109.

=== Later career ===
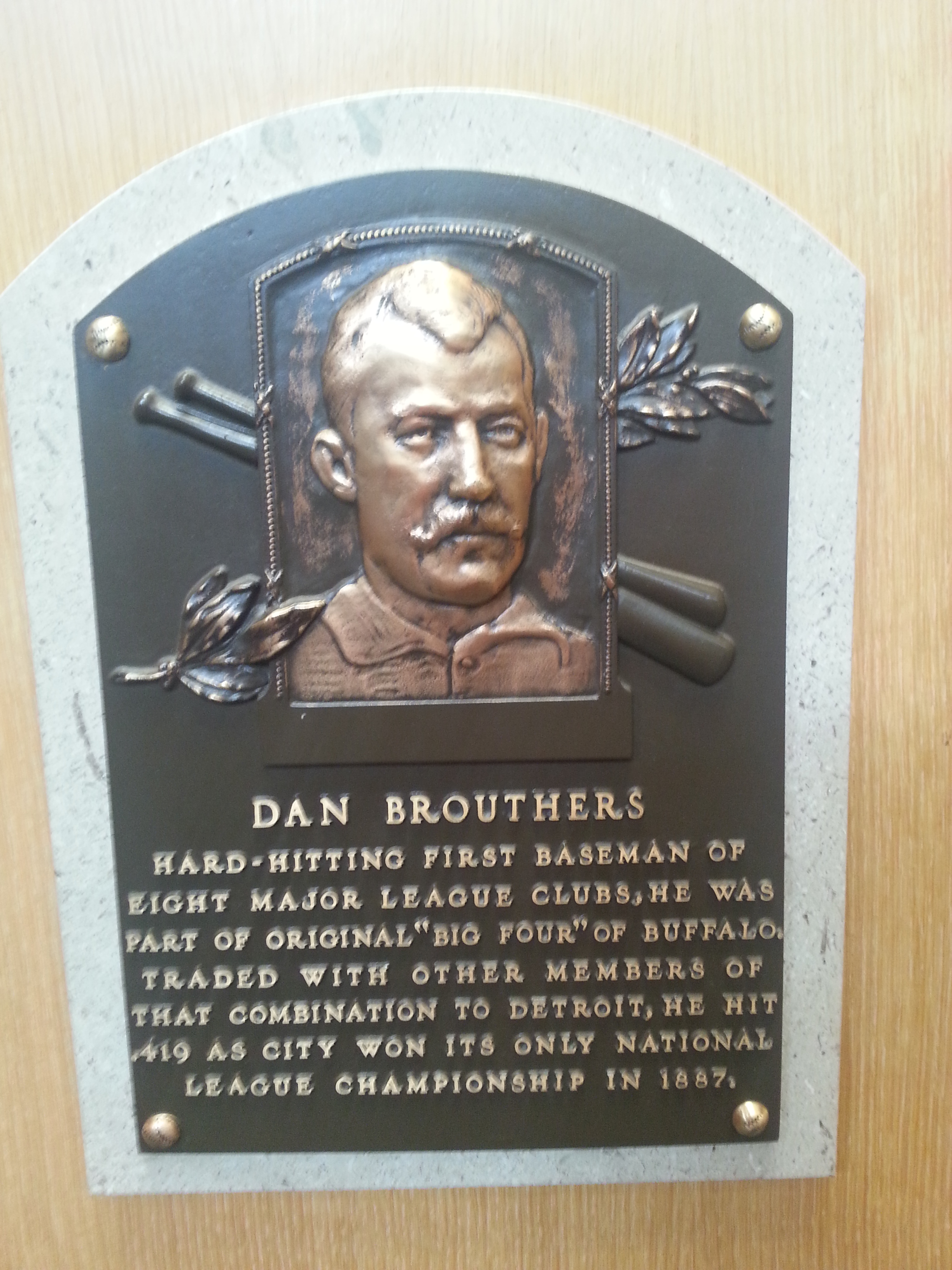
Plaque of Brouthers at the Baseball Hall of Fame

After the American Association folded following the 1891 season, Brouthers was sent to the Brooklyn Grooms of the NL, where he played two seasons. Most of his success came in that first season, when he led the league in batting average, hits, RBIs and total bases. For the 1893 season, he played in only 77 of the team's games, but did well, hitting .337. After the season, Brouthers was traded along with Willie Keeler to the Baltimore Orioles for Billy Shindle and George Treadway.

This trade brought in two future Hall of Fame players, which added to the already established Orioles core of players including third baseman John McGraw, catcher Wilbert Robinson, shortstop Hughie Jennings, and center fielder Joe Kelley, all future Hall of Fame members. The Orioles won the league's championship that season, and it was Brouthers' last full season in the majors, as he again produced great numbers, batting .347, finishing seventh in total bases, fifth in RBIs (128), fourth in doubles (39), and fifth in triples (23).

During his career, and most notably during his time in Baltimore, he was known to always have his dog, an Irish Setter named Kelly, and had him sit in the players' area. It is claimed that the players never minded much, as he was very well-behaved and never left the area to run out on the field or made much noise.

Early in the 1895 season, Baltimore sold Brouthers to the Louisville Colonels for $500, as his skills seemed to have diminished, and he only played in 24 of Louisville's games that season; he came back to hit .309 for them, ending the year with a .300 overall mark. Following the season, Louisville sold him to the Philadelphia Phillies for $500, where he played in 57 games in 1896, batting .344. After being released by the Phillies, Brouthers continued to play in the minors, in the Eastern League (now the International League) with Rochester, Toronto and Springfield, Massachusetts before finally "retiring" after the 1899 season. In 1903, however, Brouthers came back to play and coach in the Class D Hudson River League; after batting .373 for Poughkeepsie in 1904, he made it back to the majors with the New York Giants, where he was 0-for-5 in a two-game stint. (But Brouthers still wasn't done as a player; he returned to Poughkeepsie in 1905, then was named player/manager for the Newburgh Hill Climbers in 1906, where he notched six hits in 16 at-bats (.375) before finally hanging them up at the age of 48.

Brouthers is still among the all-time leaders in many offensive categories. His .342 batting average ranks ninth, 205 triples ranks eighth, and his .423 on-base percentage ranks 15th. He is tied with Mike Tiernan for fourth among 19th-century home run hitters with a total of 106, behind Roger Connor (138), Sam Thompson (127), and Stovey (122).

== Later life and legacy ==
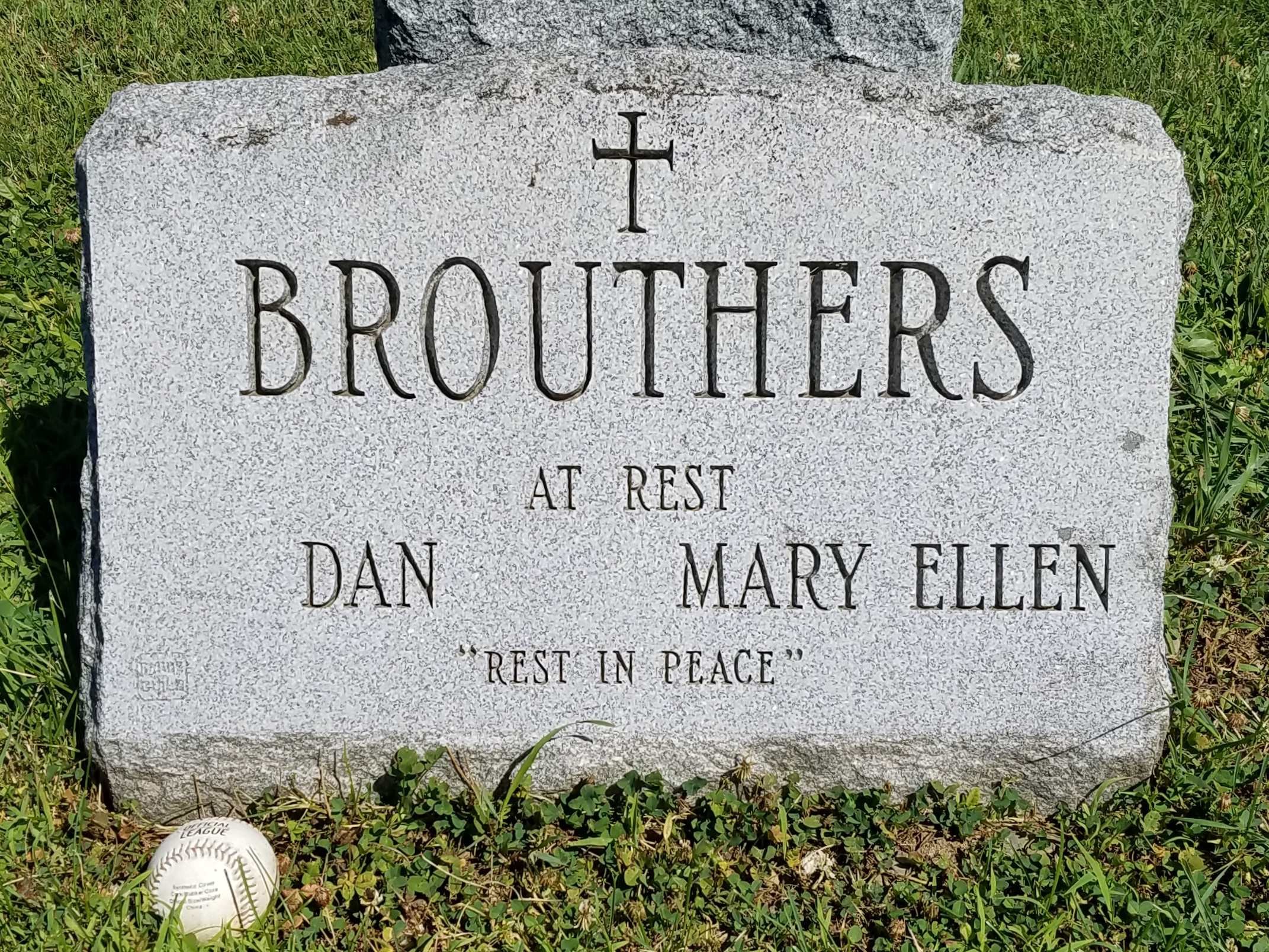
Brouthers' grave at St. Mary's Church Cemetery in Wappingers Falls

Brouthers played minor league baseball for the 1898 Toronto Maple Leafs of the Eastern League, where he won a batting title with a .415 average. Later he played for the Poughkeepsie Colts of the Hudson River League, batting a league-leading .373 at age 46.

He remained near baseball for many years, working for his former teammate and New York Giants manager John McGraw, who placed him in charge of the Polo Grounds press gate. He was with the Giants for nearly 20 years in this and other capacities.

On New Year's Eve in 1884, Brouthers married Mary Ellen Croak, an Irish immigrant to New York and fellow Catholic, at St. Mary's in Wappingers Falls. They had four children together and were married for 48 years until his death.

Brouthers died at the age of 74 at his home in East Orange, New Jersey, and is interred at St. Mary's Church Cemetery in Wappingers Falls, New York. There is a statue dedicated to him located in Veteran's Park in the same village. In 1945, Brouthers and several other stars of the era prior to 1910 were elected to the Baseball Hall of Fame by the Veterans Committee. In honor of his achievements in Buffalo, he was inducted into the newly formed Buffalo Baseball Hall of Fame in 1985. In 1999, a survey of the Society for American Baseball Research ranked him as the sixth-greatest player of the 19th century.

== See also ==
- List of Major League Baseball career hits leaders
- List of Major League Baseball career doubles leaders
- List of Major League Baseball career triples leaders
- List of Major League Baseball career runs scored leaders
- List of Major League Baseball career runs batted in leaders
- List of Major League Baseball batting champions
- List of Major League Baseball annual doubles leaders
- List of Major League Baseball annual triples leaders
- List of Major League Baseball annual home run leaders
- List of Major League Baseball annual runs scored leaders
- List of Major League Baseball annual runs batted in leaders
- List of Major League Baseball players who played in four decades
- List of Major League Baseball single-game hits leaders
- List of Major League Baseball doubles records
- List of Major League Baseball triples records
- Major League Baseball titles leaders

Records
Preceded by Harry Stovey	Career home run record holders 1887–1888	Succeeded by Harry Stovey
