= Bob Johnson (outfielder) =

American baseball player (1905–1982)

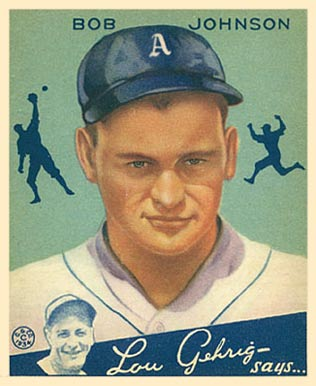
- Johnson c. 1934
- Left fielder
- Born: November 26, 1905; Pryor Creek, Oklahoma, U.S.
- Died: July 6, 1982 (aged 76); Tacoma, Washington, U.S.
- Batted: Right Threw: Right

MLB debut
- April 12, 1933, for the Philadelphia Athletics

Last MLB appearance
- September 23, 1945, for the Boston Red Sox

MLB statistics
- Batting average: .296
- Hits: 2,051
- Home runs: 288
- Runs batted in: 1,283
- Stats at Baseball Reference

Teams
- Philadelphia Athletics (1933–1942); Washington Senators (1943); Boston Red Sox (1944–1945)

Career highlights and awards
- 8× All-Star (1935, 1938–1940, 1942–1945); Philadelphia Baseball Wall of Fame; Athletics Hall of Fame

Robert Lee Johnson (November 26, 1905 – July 6, 1982), nicknamed "Indian Bob", was an American professional baseball player. He played as a left fielder in Major League Baseball for three American League teams from 1933 to 1945, primarily the Philadelphia Athletics. His elder brother Roy was a major league outfielder from 1929 to 1938.

Johnson was the fifth player to have nine consecutive seasons of 20 or more home runs, and his 288 career home runs ranked eighth in major league history when he retired. Usually playing on inferior teams, he batted .300 five times, had eight seasons with 100 runs batted in, and finished his career among the AL's top five right-handed hitters in career RBI (1,283), runs (1,239), slugging average (.506), total bases (3,501) and walks (1,075). He held the Athletics franchise record for career runs from 1942 to 1993. He also ranked among the AL leaders in games in left field (3rd, 1,592) and outfield putouts (10th, 4,003) and assists (8th, 208) when his career ended.

== Early years ==
Born in Pryor Creek, Oklahoma, Johnson grew up in Tacoma, Washington, and thereafter made the city his home. His nickname was derived from his lineage, which was one-quarter Cherokee. Due to the abundance of quality outfielders in the late 1920s and early 1930s, he did not reach the major leagues until 1933, when he was 27.

== Major league career ==
=== Philadelphia Athletics ===
Johnson joined the Athletics in 1933, replacing Al Simmons, who had been traded to the Chicago White Sox. Philadelphia had won three straight pennants from 1929 to 1931, but after a second-place finish in 1932 owner-manager Connie Mack began gradually dealing away most of his star players in order to keep the club afloat financially during the Great Depression. As a rookie Johnson hit .290 with 20 home runs, 103 runs and 93 RBI, and was second in the AL with 44 doubles. But the team ended the season in third place; their 79–72 record was their last winning season until 1947, and they would occupy last place in six of Johnson's 10 seasons, along with two seventh-place finishes. Catcher Mickey Cochrane and pitcher Lefty Grove were traded in December 1933, speeding the team's decline.

Johnson took full advantage of playing in Shibe Park, which had long been a decidedly friendly environment for right-handed hitters such as Simmons and Jimmie Foxx. In 1934 Johnson improved his average to .307, including a 26-game hitting streak, and added a career-high 34 home runs along with 111 runs and 92 RBI; he also led the league with 17 assists. On June 16 he tied an AL record by going 6-for-6 with two home runs and a double. In 1935 he made his first All-Star team, had 103 runs and 109 RBI, and finished fourth in the AL in home runs (28) for the third straight year. Foxx and Doc Cramer were traded in late 1935, and over the next several years Johnson provided solid and consistent offensive production as the A's remained mired at the bottom of the league. He was among the league's top 10 home run hitters in every season through 1941, joining Babe Ruth, Lou Gehrig, Mel Ott and Foxx as the fifth player to have nine straight 20-home run campaigns. He also drove in over 100 runs in each year through 1941, scoring over 110 in 1938 and 1939; he was again an All-Star each year from 1938 through 1940. He set an AL record by driving in six runs in the first inning with a grand slam and a double off White Sox pitcher Monty Stratton on August 29, 1937; then, in an 8–3 victory over the St. Louis Browns on June 12, 1938, he drove in all the runs with three home runs and a single. That year, playing primarily in center field, he again led the AL with 21 assists.

After hitting .306 and .313 in 1937 and 1938, Johnson posted a career-high mark of .338 in 1939 – third in the AL behind Joe DiMaggio (.381) and Foxx (.360) – and placed eighth in the MLB Most Valuable Player Award voting; he was also third in the AL with 114 RBI. In 1942, his last season with the Athletics, he made his fifth All-Star team and broke Foxx's team record of 975 career runs; his final total of 997 remained the club record until Rickey Henderson broke it in 1993. Johnson left the Athletics ranking second in franchise history to Jimmy Dykes in games (1,459) and at bats (5,428); second to Simmons in total bases (2,824); second to Foxx in home runs (252); and third behind Simmons and Foxx in hits (1,617) and RBI (1,040). He led the Athletics in RBI in each of his last seven seasons there following Foxx's departure.

=== Washington Senators ===
In March 1943, after complaining that he was underappreciated, Johnson was traded at his request to the Washington Senators for outfielder Bobby Estalella and cash. He thrived in his first pennant race in years as Washington finished in second place, the second and last time he would be on a winning team. His veteran leadership was invaluable to the team, as despite posting career lows in nearly every offensive category – a .265 batting average, .400 slugging average, seven home runs, 63 RBI, 65 runs, 116 hits, 22 doubles, 117 games and 438 at bats – he placed fifth in the Most Valuable Player Award balloting (the highest finish of his career) and was again an All-Star. The decline in his offensive statistics is partially attributable to moving from hitter-friendly Shibe Park to cavernous Griffith Stadium; but as he did not even lead his own team in any category, the respect suggested by the Most Valuable Player vote is remarkable.

=== Boston Red Sox ===
At the end of the 1943 season, Johnson's contract was purchased by the Boston Red Sox, a deal Washington owner Clark Griffith later described as his worst ever. At 38, Johnson had an excellent 1944 season for the Sox, collecting 106 RBI and 106 runs (both second in the league) in 144 games and leading the AL with a .431 on-base percentage. He hit for the cycle on July 6, came in third in the batting race with a .324 average (behind Lou Boudreau, .327, and teammate Bobby Doerr, .325), lost the slugging title to Doerr by a fraction of a point, and was 10th in the Most Valuable Player Award voting. He was named to the All-Star team in both 1944 and 1945, although the 1945 All-Star game was not played due to World War II travel restrictions. With numerous players returning to the major leagues from military service, he retired at the end of the 1945 season after hitting .280 with 12 home runs and 74 RBI.

=== Statistics ===
Johnson compiled a .296 career batting average with 2,051 hits, 396 doubles, 95 triples and 96 stolen bases in 1,863 games. His 1,592 games in left field then put him behind only Goose Goslin (1,949) and Bobby Veach (1,671) in AL history. Many modern baseball fans are unfamiliar with Johnson, but he posted excellent totals in 13 years before quietly retiring.

Seasons	BA	G	AB	R	H	TB	2B	3B	HR	RBI	BB	SO	SB	OBP	SLG	OPS	FLD%
13	.296	1863	6920	1239	2051	3501	396	95	288	1283	1075	851	96	.393	.506	.899	.967

While primarily a left fielder, Johnson also played 167 games in center field, 39 games at first base, 28 games at second base, 27 games in right field, and 20 games at third base. He was ejected only once in his career, in 1937 by umpire Charles Johnston, for arguing balls and strikes.

Johnson spoiled no-hit games by getting the only hit for his club three times, one of them a homer off Yankee ace Lefty Gomez on June 30, 1937.

Johnson is one of three players in major league history to drive in all his club's runs in a single game (minimum eight runs);

On June 14, 1924, first baseman George Kelly hit three home runs to drive in all eight New York Giants runs in an 8–6 win over the Cincinnati Reds.
Johnson matched this one-man offensive on June 12, 1938, when the Athletics beat the St. Louis Browns 8–3, driving in all the runs with two home runs (one a grand slam, his second of the month) and a single.
The mark was surpassed on September 2, 1996, in a ten-inning game, when Mike Greenwell got all nine RBI in a Boston 9–8 victory over the Seattle Mariners.

Johnson was the first of only two players (the other was Ichiro Suzuki) to make his major league debut after his 27th birthday, and still finish with over 2000 hits.

== Later years ==
After leaving the major leagues, Johnson spent five more seasons in the minor leagues managing and playing for the Tacoma Tigers in the Western International League.

=== Legacy ===
In 1964, Johnson was inducted into the State of Washington Sports Hall of Fame. He was honored by the Philadelphia Baseball Wall of Fame in 1989.

Baseball author Bob Carroll commented on Johnson; "Indian Bob Johnson never had one of those super seasons that make everyone sit up and whistle. While phenoms came, collected their MVP trophies, and faded, he just kept plodding along hitting .300, with a couple dozen homers and a hundred ribbies year after year. Like a guy punching a time clock."

== Personal life ==
Bob Johnson was one of eight children, four boys and four girls.

His first wife was Caroline (Stout), whom he married in 1924. The couple had three children, daughters Roberta Louise and Beverly Jean, and son Robert Lee Johnson III. Robert Lee III died before turning one year old. Beverly died in 1953 of lupus.

Around the late 1940s or 1950, Johnson's marriage to Caroline ended in divorce. In late 1950, Johnson married Betty (Pastore). The following year the couple had a son who carried a familiar name, Robert Lee Johnson III.

Bob Johnson died of heart failure on July 6, 1982, in Tacoma, at age 76.

== See also ==
- List of lifetime home run leaders through history
- List of Major League Baseball career home run leaders
- List of Major League Baseball career hits leaders
- List of Major League Baseball career runs scored leaders
- List of Major League Baseball career runs batted in leaders
- List of Major League Baseball players to hit for the cycle
- List of Major League Baseball single-game hits leaders

Achievements
Preceded by Bobby Doerr	Hitting for the cycle July 6, 1944	Succeeded by Dixie Walker
