= Charley Jones =

American baseball player (1852–1911)

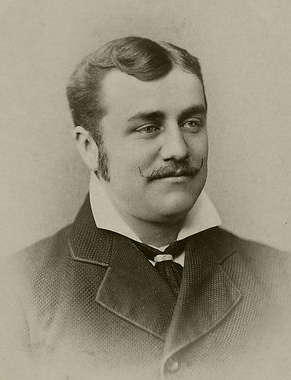
- Outfielder
- Born: April 30, 1852; Alamance County, North Carolina, U.S.
- Died: June 6, 1911 (aged 59); New York, New York, U.S.
- Batted: Right Threw: Right

Major league debut
- May 4, 1875, for the Keokuk Westerns

Last major league appearance
- April 26, 1888, for the Kansas City Cowboys

Major league statistics
- Batting average: .298
- Home runs: 56
- Runs batted in: 553
- Stats at Baseball Reference

Teams
- Keokuk Westerns (1875); Hartford Dark Blues (1875); Cincinnati Reds (1876–1877); Chicago White Stockings (1877); Cincinnati Reds (1877–1878); Boston Red Caps (1879–1880); Cincinnati Red Stockings (1883–1887); New York Metropolitans (1887); Kansas City Cowboys (1888)

Career highlights and awards
- NL home run leader (1879); NL RBI leader (1879)

Charles Wesley Jones (born Benjamin Wesley Rippay on April 30, 1852 – June 6, 1911) was an American professional baseball left fielder who hit 56 home runs and batted .298 during his 12 year major-league career, and was perhaps the first "slugger." He was born in Alamance County, North Carolina. He was the 13th player to collect 1,000 hits, doing so in 1886.

== Career ==
Jones played for several teams; the Keokuk Westerns, Hartford Dark Blues, Cincinnati Reds (NL), Chicago White Stockings, Boston Red Caps, Cincinnati Red Stockings (AA), New York Metropolitans, and Kansas City Cowboys. A popular but controversial player, despite his hitting ability he never played for a league champion.

On June 10, 1880, Jones became the first big leaguer to hit two homers in the same inning. Both home runs came off Buffalo Bisons' pitcher Tom Poorman in the eighth inning of a 19–3 rout.

Jones best period was from 1883 to 1885, when he hit 22 home runs, had 186 RBI, and batted .310. Through the first nine seasons of the major leagues' existence, Jones held the career record for home runs, despite missing two of those seasons (1881–82) as a result of being blackballed from the sport. In 1887, he dropped to fourth place. By 1889, he was just tenth, and by 1890 he was no longer among the top ten.

After his playing career concluded, Jones spent two seasons as an umpire. He umpired 121 games in the Players' League in 1890, and 76 games in the American Association in 1891.

== See also ==
- List of Major League Baseball career triples leaders
- List of Major League Baseball annual runs batted in leaders
- List of Major League Baseball annual home run leaders
- List of Major League Baseball home run records
- List of Major League Baseball annual runs scored leaders

Records
Preceded by George Hall	Single season home run record holder 1879–1883	Succeeded by Harry Stovey
Preceded by Lip Pike	Career home run record holder 1880–1881	Succeeded by Jim O'Rourke
Preceded by Jim O'Rourke	Career home run record holder 1883–1884	Succeeded by Harry Stovey
