= Mike Tiernan =

American baseball player (1867–1918)

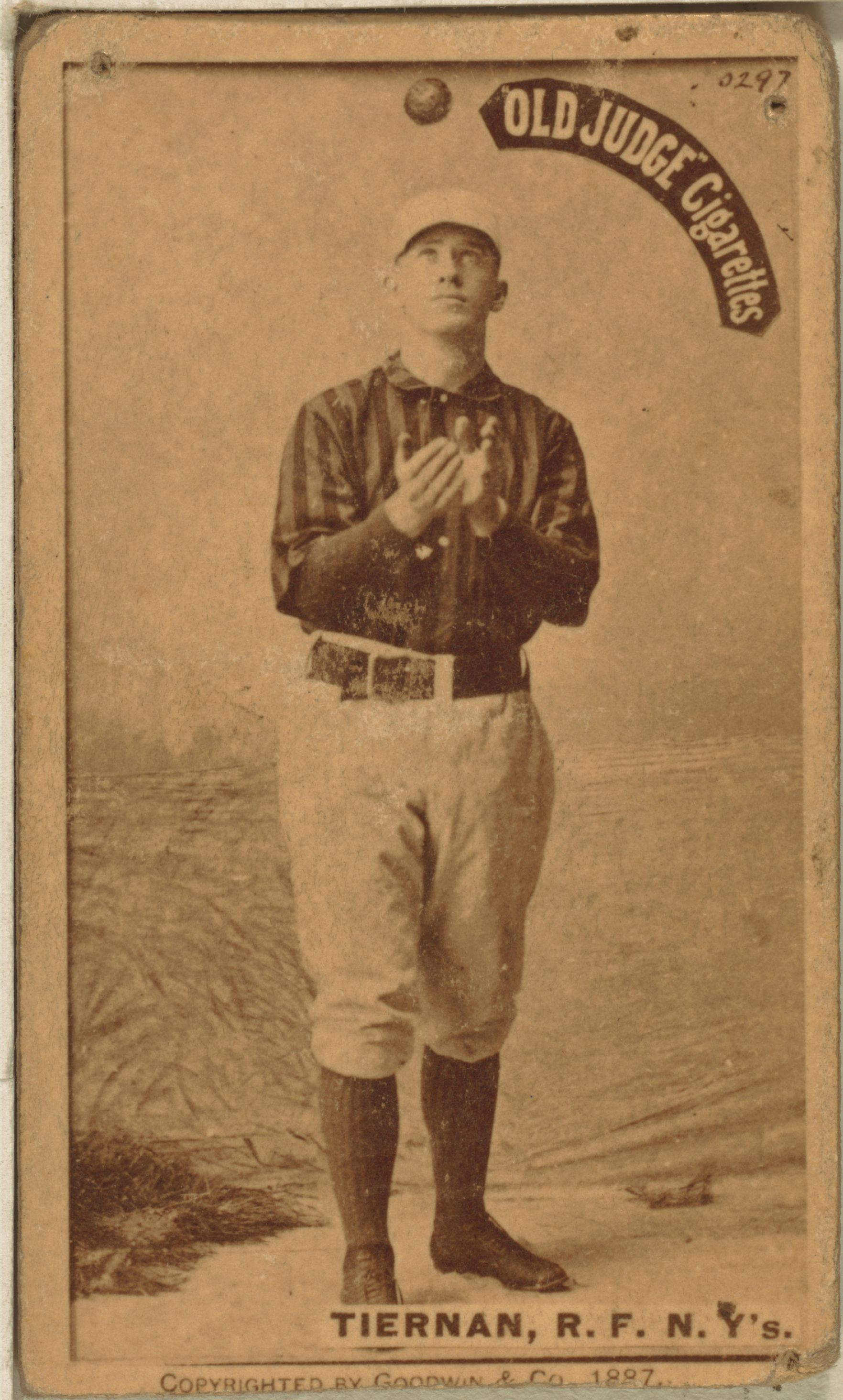
- Right fielder
- Born: January 21, 1867; Trenton, New Jersey, U.S.
- Died: November 7, 1918 (aged 51); New York City, U.S.
- Batted: Left Threw: Left

MLB debut
- April 30, 1887, for the New York Giants

Last MLB appearance
- July 31, 1899, for the New York Giants

MLB statistics
- Batting average: .311
- Hits: 1,838
- Home runs: 106
- Runs batted in: 851
- Runs scored: 1,316
- Stolen bases: 428
- Stats at Baseball Reference

Teams
- New York Giants (1887–1899)

Career highlights and awards
- 2× NL home run leader (1890, 1891)

Michael Joseph Tiernan (January 21, 1867 – November 7, 1918), nicknamed "Silent Mike", was an American professional baseball right fielder. He played in Major League Baseball (MLB), exclusively for the New York Giants, from 1887 to 1899.

== Early life ==
A native of Trenton, New Jersey, Tiernan was born across the street from Trenton State Prison, and he participated in ice skating and track as a young man. Beginning in 1884, Tiernan played town baseball in Williamsport, Pennsylvania. The 17-year-old attracted attention with his success in exhibitions against major league clubs, once striking out 15 in a game against the Providence Grays.

Because of that success, the New York Giants wanted to sign Tiernan as a pitcher in 1887. Tiernan, however, wanted to play in the outfield rather than pitch. The Giants ultimately agreed to play him in the outfield.

== Career ==
Tiernan's debut major league game was on April 30, 1887. On June 15 of that season, he scored six runs in a single game, and is one of only a handful of major league players to have accomplished that feat. Tiernan was nicknamed "Silent Mike" because he generally avoided the press and did not protest when umpires made questionable calls.

Tiernan led the National League in home runs in 1890 and 1891, and compiled a .311 lifetime batting average. His final game was played on July 31, 1899. He is the Giants' all-time franchise leader in triples and stolen bases. One of the great home run hitters of the 19th century, he hit 106 of them, which ties him with Hall of Famer Dan Brouthers for fourth most among 19th century ball players.

== Later life ==
Tiernan lived in New York City after his playing career, and he owned a restaurant. He died of tuberculosis at Bellevue Hospital in 1918.

== See also ==
- List of Major League Baseball career triples leaders
- List of Major League Baseball career runs scored leaders
- List of Major League Baseball annual home run leaders
- List of Major League Baseball annual runs scored leaders
- List of Major League Baseball annual saves leaders
- List of Major League Baseball career stolen bases leaders
- List of Major League Baseball players who spent their entire career with one franchise
- List of Major League Baseball players to hit for the cycle

Achievements
Preceded by Jimmy Ryan; Larry Twitchell	Hitting for the cycle August 25, 1888; June 28, 1890	Succeeded by Pete Browning; Bill Van Dyke
