= List of Major League Baseball career hits leaders =

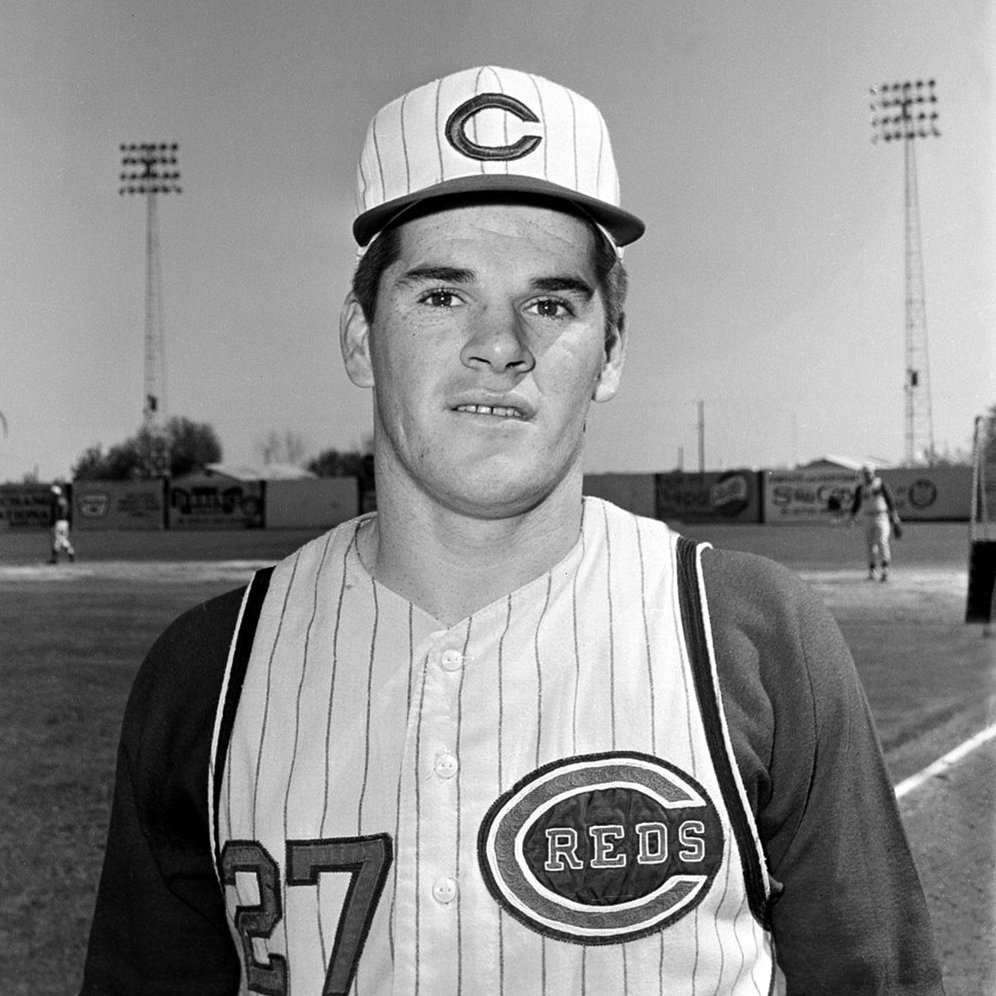
Pete Rose is the all-time MLB hits leader with 4,256 hits.

Listed are all Major League Baseball players who have reached the 2,000 hit milestone during their career in MLB. Pete Rose holds the Major League record for most career hits, with 4,256. Rose and Ty Cobb, second most, are the only players with 4,000 or more career hits. Cap Anson was the first player to achieve 2,000 hits, doing so in the 1889 season. Nap Lajoie was the first player to accumulate 2,000 hits in the American League, doing so in the 1912 season.

For many years, George Davis was considered the first switch hitter to collect 2,000 hits, achieving that total during the 1902 season. However, recent research in the 2010s has revealed that 19th century hitter Roger Connor also batted right-handed at times in his career; he reached 2,000 hits in the 1893 season.

As of September 27, 2026, Freddie Freeman is the active leader in career hits and 84th overall with 2,598.

== Players with 2,000 or more hits ==
Key
**Rank**	Rank among leaders in career hits (a blank field indicates a tie)
**Player (2026 hits)**	Number of hits during the 2026 Major League Baseball season
**Hits**	Total career hits
*	Denotes elected to National Baseball Hall of Fame
**Bold**	Denotes an active player (Note: A player is considered inactive if he has announced his retirement or has not played for a full season.)

- Stats updated as of September 27, 2026.

Ranks	Player	Hits
1	Pete Rose	4,256
2	Ty Cobb* (Note: Major League Baseball lists Cobb's hit total at 4,191, although research has revised the total to 4,189 because of double-counting a 2-hit day.)	4,189
3	Hank Aaron*	3,771
4	Stan Musial*	3,630
5	Tris Speaker*	3,514
6	Derek Jeter*	3,465
7	Cap Anson* (Note: Cap Anson's hit amounts are different depending on the source and what hits are included in various leagues he played in. His total varies from 2,995 to 3,435. MLB.com credits him with 3,011. Major League Baseball credits him with 3,081 hits, which is verified by Elias Sports Bureau. Baseball-Reference.com credits him with 3,435.)	3,435
8	Honus Wagner*	3,430
9	Carl Yastrzemski*	3,419
10	Albert Pujols	3,384
11	Paul Molitor*	3,319
12	Eddie Collins*	3,314
13	Willie Mays*	3,293
14	Eddie Murray*	3,255
15	Nap Lajoie*	3,243
16	Cal Ripken Jr.*	3,184
17	Miguel Cabrera	3,174
18	Adrián Beltré*	3,166
19	George Brett*	3,154
20	Paul Waner*	3,152
21	Robin Yount*	3,142
22	Tony Gwynn*	3,141
23	Alex Rodriguez	3,115
24	Dave Winfield*	3,110
25	Ichiro Suzuki*	3,089
26	Craig Biggio*	3,060
27	Rickey Henderson*	3,055
28	Rod Carew*	3,053
29	Lou Brock*	3,023
30	Rafael Palmeiro	3,020
31	Wade Boggs*	3,010
32	Al Kaline*	3,007
33	Roberto Clemente*	3,000
34	Sam Rice*	2,987
35	Sam Crawford*	2,961
36	Frank Robinson*	2,943
37	Barry Bonds	2,935
38	Willie Keeler*	2,932
39	Jake Beckley*	2,930
	Rogers Hornsby*	2,930
41	Al Simmons*	2,927
42	Zack Wheat*	2,884
43	Frankie Frisch*	2,880
44	Omar Vizquel	2,877
45	Mel Ott*	2,876
46	Babe Ruth*	2,873
47	Harold Baines*	2,866
48	Jesse Burkett*	2,850
49	Brooks Robinson*	2,848
50	Iván Rodríguez*	2,844
51	Charlie Gehringer*	2,839
52	George Sisler*	2,810
53	Ken Griffey Jr.*	2,781
54	Andre Dawson*	2,774
55	Johnny Damon	2,769
56	Vada Pinson	2,757
57	Luke Appling*	2,749
58	Al Oliver	2,743
59	Goose Goslin*	2,735
60	Tony Pérez*	2,732
61	Chipper Jones*	2,726
62	Carlos Beltrán*	2,725
63	Roberto Alomar*	2,724
64	Lou Gehrig*	2,721
65	Rusty Staub	2,716
66	Bill Buckner	2,715
67	Dave Parker*	2,712
68	Billy Williams*	2,711
69	Doc Cramer	2,705
70	Gary Sheffield	2,689
71	Fred Clarke* (Note: Fred Clarke's hit amounts are different depending on the source. His total varies from 2,672 to 2,678. MLB.com credits him with 2,672. Baseball-Reference.com credits him with 2,678 with 3 hits additionally in 1894 and 1897.)	2,678
72	Luis Aparicio*	2,677
73	Max Carey*	2,665
74	Nellie Fox*	2,663
75	George Davis*	2,660

Rank	Player	Hits
	Harry Heilmann*	2,660
77	Ted Williams*	2,654
78	Jimmie Foxx*	2,646
79	Lave Cross	2,645
80	Robinson Canó	2,639
81	Rabbit Maranville*	2,605
	Tim Raines*	2,605
83	Steve Garvey	2,599
84	**Freddie Freeman (167)**	2,598
85	Ed Delahanty*	2,596
86	Luis González	2,591
87	Vladimir Guerrero*	2,590
88	Julio Franco	2,586
89	Reggie Jackson*	2,584
90	Ernie Banks*	2,583
91	Richie Ashburn*	2,574
	Manny Ramirez	2,574
93	Willie Davis	2,561
94	Steve Finley	2,548
95	George Van Haltren	2,539
96	Garret Anderson	2,529
97	Heinie Manush*	2,524
98	**Jose Altuve (131)**	2,519
	Todd Helton*	2,519
100	Joe Morgan*	2,517
101	Buddy Bell	2,514
102	Jimmy Ryan	2,513
103	Mickey Vernon	2,495
104	Fred McGriff*	2,490
105	David Ortiz*	2,472
	Ted Simmons*	2,472
107	Joe Medwick*	2,471
108	Bobby Abreu	2,470
109	Frank Thomas*	2,468
110	Roger Connor*	2,467
111	Harry Hooper*	2,466
112	Jeff Kent*	2,461
113	Ozzie Smith*	2,460
114	Lloyd Waner*	2,459
115	Bill Dahlen	2,458 (Note: Major League Baseball lists Dahlen's hit total as 2,458. Baseball-Reference.com credits him with 2,461 with 3 hits additionally in 1894.)
116	Jimmy Rollins	2,455
117	Torii Hunter	2,452
	Jim Rice*	2,452
119	Red Schoendienst*	2,449
120	Dwight Evans	2,446
121	Mark Grace	2,445
122	Kenny Lofton	2,428
123	Pie Traynor*	2,416
124	Mickey Mantle*	2,415
125	Sammy Sosa	2,408
126	Miguel Tejada	2,407
127	Stuffy McInnis	2,405
128	Nick Markakis	2,388
129	Ryne Sandberg*	2,386
130	Enos Slaughter*	2,383
131	Chili Davis	2,380
132	Edd Roush*	2,376
133	Brett Butler	2,375
	Michael Young	2,375
135	Lou Whitaker	2,369
136	Alan Trammell*	2,365
137	Carlton Fisk*	2,356
138	Joe Judge	2,352
139	Orlando Cepeda*	2,351
140	Billy Herman*	2,345
141	Joe Torre*	2,342
142	Paul Konerko	2,340
	Barry Larkin*	2,340
144	Bernie Williams	2,336
145	Andrés Galarraga	2,333
146	Jim Thome*	2,328
147	Édgar Rentería	2,327
148	Dave Concepción	2,326
	Jake Daubert	2,326
	B. J. Surhoff	2,326

Rank	Player	Hits
151	Eddie Mathews*	2,315
152	Jeff Bagwell*	2,314
153	Jim Bottomley*	2,313
154	Bobby Wallace*	2,309
155	Jim O'Rourke*	2,304
	Kirby Puckett*	2,304
157	Aramis Ramírez	2,303
158	Kiki Cuyler*	2,299
	Charlie Grimm	2,299
160	Dan Brouthers*	2,296
161	Hugh Duffy*	2,293
162	Joe Cronin*	2,285
163	Gary Gaetti	2,280
	**Andrew McCutchen (14)**	2,280
165	**Paul Goldschmidt (87)**	2,277
166	Tony Fernández	2,276
167	Carlos Lee	2,273
168	Jimmy Dykes	2,256
169	Willie McGee	2,254
	Ron Santo*	2,254
171	Patsy Donovan	2,253
172	Tommy Corcoran	2,252
173	José Cruz	2,251
	Marquis Grissom	2,251
175	Bid McPhee*	2,250
176	Bert Campaneris	2,249
177	Edgar Martínez*	2,247
178	John Olerud	2,239
179	Mike Schmidt*	2,234
180	Willie Stargell*	2,232
181	Fred Tenney	2,231
182	Joe Sewell*	2,226
183	Graig Nettles	2,225
184	Darrell Evans	2,223
185	Joe Kelley*	2,220
186	Juan Pierre	2,217
187	Joe DiMaggio*	2,214
188	Joe Kuhel	2,212
189	Willie McCovey*	2,211
190	Willie Randolph	2,210
191	Willie Wilson	2,207
192	**Manny Machado (128)**	2,197
193	Jason Kendall	2,195
194	Stan Hack	2,193
	Bill Terry*	2,193
196	Cecil Cooper	2,192
197	Larry Bowa	2,191
198	Joe Carter	2,184
199	Keith Hernandez	2,182
200	Will Clark	2,176
201	Pee Wee Reese*	2,170
202	Sherry Magee	2,169
203	Yadier Molina	2,168
204	Dick Bartell	2,165
205	Larry Walker*	2,160
206	Billy Hamilton*	2,159
207	Hal Chase	2,158
208	Magglio Ordóñez	2,156
209	Víctor Martínez	2,153
	Don Mattingly	2,153
211	Rubén Sierra	2,152
212	Yogi Berra*	2,150
	Ed Konetchy	2,150
214	Ken Boyer	2,143
	Ken Griffey Sr.	2,143
	Tommy Leach	2,143
217	Plácido Polanco	2,142
218	Dick Groat	2,138
	Wally Moses	2,138
	José Reyes	2,138
221	Don Baylor	2,135
	Joey Votto	2,135
223	Moisés Alou	2,134
	Maury Wills	2,134
225	Paul Hines	2,133

Rank	Player	Hits
226	Buddy Myer	2,131
227	Herman Long	2,128
228	Mike Piazza*	2,127
229	Joe Mauer*	2,123
230	Tommy Davis	2,121
231	Duke Snider*	2,116
232	Minnie Miñoso*	2,113
233	Dale Murphy	2,111
234	Chris Chambliss	2,109
235	Ellis Burks	2,107
	John Montgomery Ward*	2,107
237	Paul O'Neill	2,105
238	Arky Vaughan*	2,103
239	Felipe Alou	2,101
240	Clyde Milan	2,100
241	Brian Downing	2,099
242	Matt Holliday	2,096
	Garry Templeton	2,096
244	Alfonso Soriano	2,095
245	Gary Carter*	2,092
	Harvey Kuenn	2,092
247	Elvis Andrus	2,091
	Hal McRae	2,091
249	Alvin Dark	2,089
250	César Cedeño	2,087
251	Harmon Killebrew*	2,086
252	Tim Wallach	2,085
253	Ed McKean	2,084
	Jimmy Sheckard	2,084
255	George J. Burns	2,077
	Scott Rolen*	2,077
257	Chuck Klein*	2,076
258	Carney Lansford	2,074
259	Deacon White*	2,067
260	Dixie Walker	2,064
261	Del Ennis	2,063
	Bobby Veach	2,063
263	Bob Elliott	2,061
264	Wally Joyner	2,060
265	**Nolan Arenado (136)**	2,057
266	Orlando Cabrera	2,055
267	Ray Durham	2,054
	George Kell*	2,054
269	Nelson Cruz	2,053
270	Bob Johnson	2,051
271	Adrián González	2,050
272	Johnny Bench*	2,048
	Dummy Hoy	2,048
274	A. J. Pierzynski	2,043
275	Bobby Doerr*	2,042
276	Jack Glasscock	2,041
277	Mark Grudzielanek	2,040
278	Carlos Delgado	2,038
279	Raúl Ibañez	2,034
280	Lee May	2,031
281	Brandon Phillips	2,029
	Ken Singleton	2,029
283	Tony Phillips	2,023
284	Jim Gilliam	2,021
285	Amos Otis	2,020
	Reggie Smith	2,020
287	Earl Averill*	2,019
288	George H. Burns	2,018
289	Bill Mazeroski*	2,016
290	Gary Matthews	2,011
	Johnny Mize*	2,011
292	Bobby Bonilla	2,010
	Jason Giambi	2,010
294	Bill Madlock	2,008
295	Tony Taylor	2,007
296	Frank White	2,006
297	Dave Bancroft*	2,004
	Todd Zeile	2,004
299	Shawn Green	2,003

Other active players with 1,800 or more hits through September 27, 2026:

- Bryce Harper (1,956) 155 in 2026
- Xander Bogaerts (1,942) 120 in 2026
- Mookie Betts (1,890) 123 in 2026
- Carlos Santana (1,882) 2 in 2026
- Mike Trout (1,878) 124 in 2026
- Salvador Perez (1,845) 133 in 2026
- Christian Yelich (1,845) 104 in 2026

== See also ==
- List of Nippon Professional Baseball career hits leaders
- List of KBO career hits leaders
