= List of Major League Baseball single-season triples leaders =

Below is the list of 112 instances in which Major League Baseball players have hit 20 or more triples in a single season. Active players are in bold. However, with the retirement of Curtis Granderson in 2020, as of May 2020, none of the players on this list are currently active players in MLB.

Rank	Player	Triples	Year
1	Chief Wilson	36	1912
2	Dave Orr	31	1886
	Heinie Reitz	31	1894
4	Perry Werden	29	1893
5	Harry Davis	28	1897
	Jimmy Williams	28	1899
7	George Davis	27	1893
	Sam Thompson	27	1894
9	John Reilly	26	1890
	George Treadway	26	1894
	Joe Jackson	26	1912
	Sam Crawford	26	1914
	Kiki Cuyler	26	1925
14	Roger Connor	25	1894
	Buck Freeman	25	1899
	Sam Crawford	25	1903
	Larry Doyle	25	1911
	Tom Long	25	1915
19	Ed McKean	24	1893
	Ty Cobb	24	1911
	Ty Cobb	24	1917
22	Harry Stovey	23	1884
	Sam Thompson	23	1887
	Elmer Smith	23	1893
	Dan Brouthers	23	1894
	Nap Lajoie	23	1897
	Ty Cobb	23	1912
	Sam Crawford	23	1913
	Earle Combs	23	1927
	Adam Comorosky	23	1930
	Dale Mitchell	23	1949
	Curtis Granderson	23	2007
33	Roger Connor	22	1887
	Jake Beckley	22	1890
	Bid McPhee	22	1890
	Joe Visner	22	1890
	Willie Keeler	22	1894
	Kip Selbach	22	1895
	John Anderson	22	1898
	Honus Wagner	22	1900
	Sam Crawford	22	1902
	Tommy Leach	22	1902
	Bill Bradley	22	1903
	Elmer Flick	22	1906
	Birdie Cree	22	1911
	Mike Mitchell	22	1911
	Tris Speaker	22	1913
	Hy Myers	22	1920
	Jake Daubert	22	1922
	Paul Waner	22	1926
	Earle Combs	22	1930
	Snuffy Stirnweiss	22	1945
52	Dave Orr	21	1885
	Billy Shindle	21	1890
	Mike Tiernan	21	1890
	Tom Brown	21	1891
	Ed Delahanty	21	1892
	Sam Thompson	21	1895
	Mike Tiernan	21	1895
	Tom McCreery	21	1896
	George Van Haltren	21	1896
	Bobby Wallace	21	1897
	Bill Keister	21	1901
	Jimmy Williams	21	1901
	Jimmy Williams	21	1902
	Cy Seymour	21	1905
	Frank Schulte	21	1911
	Frank Baker	21	1912
	Sam Crawford	21	1912
	Vic Saier	21	1913
	Joe Jackson	21	1916
	Edd Roush	21	1924
	Earle Combs	21	1928
	Willie Wilson	21	1985
	Lance Johnson	21	1996
76	Buck Ewing	20	1884
	Roger Connor	20	1886
	Dan Brouthers	20	1887
	Dick Johnston	20	1887
	Harry Stovey	20	1888
	Jocko Fields	20	1890
	Perry Werden	20	1890
	Harry Stovey	20	1891
	Dan Brouthers	20	1892
	Jake Virtue	20	1892
	Tommy Corcoran	20	1894
	Joe Kelley	20	1894
	Jake Stenzel	20	1894
	Duff Cooley	20	1895
	Buck Freeman	20	1903
	George Stone	20	1906
	Ty Cobb	20	1908
	Red Murray	20	1912
	Honus Wagner	20	1912
	Dots Miller	20	1913
	Rogers Hornsby	20	1920
	Joe Jackson	20	1920
	Rabbit Maranville	20	1924
	Goose Goslin	20	1925
	Lou Gehrig	20	1926
	Curt Walker	20	1926
	Jim Bottomley	20	1928
	Heinie Manush	20	1928
	Lloyd Waner	20	1929
	Bill Terry	20	1931
	Joe Vosmik	20	1935
	Jeff Heath	20	1941
	Stan Musial	20	1943
	Stan Musial	20	1946
	Willie Mays	20	1957
	George Brett	20	1979
	Cristian Guzmán	20	2000
	Jimmy Rollins	20	2007

== See also related lists ==
- List of Major League Baseball career triples leaders
- List of Major League Baseball career doubles leaders
- List of Major League Baseball career home run leaders
- List of Major League Baseball career hits leaders
- List of Major League Baseball career runs scored leaders
- List of Major League Baseball career runs batted in leaders
- 20–20–20 club
