= List of Major League Baseball triples records =

There are various Major League Baseball records for triples.

== 175 career triples ==
Player	Triples	Teams & Seasons
Sam Crawford	309	1899–1902 Cincinnati; 1903–17 Detroit
Ty Cobb	297	1905–26 Detroit; 1927–28 Philadelphia (AL)
Honus Wagner	252	1897–99 Louisville; 1900–17 Pittsburgh
Jake Beckley	243^{1}	1888–89, 1891–96 Pittsburgh; 1890 Pittsburgh (PL); 1896–97 New York (NL); 1897–1903 Cincinnati; 1904–07 St. Louis (NL)
Roger Connor	233	1880–82 Troy (NL); 1883–91, 1893–94 New York (NL); 1892 Philadelphia (NL); 1894–97 St. Louis (NL)
Tris Speaker	222	1907–15 Boston (AL); 1916–26 Cleveland, 1927 Washington; 1928 Philadelphia (AL)
Dan Brouthers	205^{2}	1879–80 Troy (NL); 1881–85 Buffalo (NL); 1886–88 Detroit (NL); Boston (NL); 1890–91 Boston (PL-AA); Brooklyn; 1894–95 Baltimore (NL); 1895 Louisville (NL); 1896 Philadelphia (NL); 1904 New York (NL)
Joe Kelley	194	1891, 1908 Boston (NL); 1892 Pittsburgh; 1892–98 Baltimore (NL); 1899–1901 Brooklyn; 1902 Baltimore (AL); 1902–06 Cincinnati
Paul Waner	191	1926–40 Pittsburgh; 1941–44 Boston (NL); 1941 Brooklyn; 1944–45 New York (AL)
Bid McPhee	188^{3}	1882–89 Cincinnati (AA); 1890–99 Cincinnati (NL)
Eddie Collins	187	1906–14, 1927–30 Philadelphia (AL), 1915–26 Chicago (AL)
Ed Delahanty	185^{4}	1888–89, 1891–1901 Philadelphia (NL); 1890 Cleveland (PL); 1902–03 Washington (AL)
Sam Rice	184	1915–33 Washington (AL); 1934 Cleveland
Jesse Burkett	182	1890 New York (NL); 1891–98 Cleveland (NL); 1899–1901 St. Louis (NL); 1902–04 St. Louis (AL); 1905 Boston (AL)
Ed Konetchy	182^{5}	1907–13 St. Louis (NL); 1914 Pittsburgh; 15 Pittsburgh (FL); 1916–18 Boston (NL); 1919–21 Brooklyn; 1921 Philadelphia (NL)
Edd Roush	182^{6}	1913 Chicago (AL); 1914–15 Indianapolis/Newark (FL); 1916, 1927–29 New York (NL); 1916–26, 1931 Cincinnati
Buck Ewing	178	1880–82 Troy (NL); 1883–92 New York (NL); 1893–94 Cleveland (NL); 1895–97 Cincinnati
Rabbit Maranville	177	1912–20, 1929–33, 1935 Boston (NL); 1921–24 Pittsburgh; 1925 Chicago (NL); 1926 Brooklyn; 1927–28 St. Louis (NL)
Stan Musial	177	1941–44, 1946–63 St. Louis (NL)

=== Closest active players ===
There are no active players that are considered close to realistically reaching 175 career triples.

There are no active players with more than 100 career triples. As of August 2026, Corbin Carroll holds the record for active players, with 59.

=== Top 10 in career triples, 1920–present ===
Player	Triples	Teams & Seasons
Paul Waner	191	1926–40 Pittsburgh Pirates, 1941–44 Boston Braves, 1941 Brooklyn Dodgers, 1944–45 New York Yankees
Stan Musial	177	1941–44, 1946–63 St. Louis Cardinals
Goose Goslin	173	1921–30, 1933, 1938 Washington Senators, 1930–32 St. Louis Browns, 1934–37 Detroit Tigers
Roberto Clemente	166	1955–72 Pittsburgh
Sam Rice	165	1915–33 Washington Senators, 1934 Cleveland Indians
Pie Traynor	164	1920–35, 1937 Pittsburgh
Lou Gehrig	163	1923–39 New York (AL)
Heinie Manush	160	1923–27 Detroit; 1928–30 St. Louis (AL); 1930–35 Washington (AL); 1936 Boston (AL); 1937–38 Brooklyn; 1938–39 Pittsburgh
Kiki Cuyler	157	1921–27 Pittsburgh; 1928–35 Chicago (NL); 1935–37 Cincinnati; 38 Brooklyn
Earle Combs	154	1924–35 New York (AL)

=== Top 10 career triples by league ===
American League Player	Triples	National League Player	Triples
Ty Cobb	297	Honus Wagner	252
Sam Crawford	249	Roger Connor	233
Tris Speaker	222	Jake Beckley	221
Eddie Collins	187	Fred Clarke	220
Sam Rice	184	Joe Kelley	194
Goose Goslin	177	Paul Waner	191
Joe Jackson	168	Buck Ewing	178
Lou Gehrig	163	Dan Brouthers	177
Joe Judge	158	Rabbit Maranville	177
Earle Combs	154	Stan Musial	177

== 25 triples in one season ==
Player	Triples	Team	Season
Chief Wilson	36	Pittsburgh Pirates	1912
Dave Orr	31	New York Metropolitans (AA)	1886
Heinie Reitz	31	Baltimore Orioles (NL)	1894
Perry Werden	29	St. Louis Browns (NL)	1894
Harry Davis	28	Pittsburgh Pirates	1897
George Davis	27	New York Giants	1893
Sam Thompson	27	Philadelphia Phillies	1894
Sam Crawford	26	Detroit Tigers	1914
Kiki Cuyler	26	Pittsburgh Pirates	1925
Joe Jackson	26	Cleveland Naps	1912
John Reilly	26	Cincinnati Reds	1890
George Treadway	26	Brooklyn Bridegrooms	1894
Roger Connor	25	New York Giants/St. Louis Browns (NL)	1894
Sam Crawford	25	Detroit Tigers	1903
Larry Doyle	25	New York Giants	1911
Buck Freeman	25	Washington Senators (NL)	1899
Tom Long	25	St. Louis Cardinals	1915

=== Progression of the single season record for triples ===
Triples	Player	Team	Year	Years Record Stood
14	Ross Barnes	Chicago White Stockings	1876	6
14	Buttercup Dickerson	Cincinnati Reds	1879	3
14	Harry Stovey	Worcester Ruby Legs	1880	2
18	Roger Connor	Troy Trojans	1882	2
20	Buck Ewing	New York Giants	1884	3
20	Roger Connor	New York Giants	1886	1
23	Sam Thompson	Detroit Wolverines	1887	3
26	John Reilly	Cincinnati Reds	1890	3
29	Perry Werden	St. Louis Browns (NL)	1893	1
31	Heinie Reitz	Baltimore Orioles (NL)	1894	18
21	Bill Keister	Baltimore Orioles	1901	(1)^{7}
21	Jimmy Williams	Baltimore Orioles	1901	(1)
22	Sam Crawford	Cincinnati Reds	1902	(1)
22	Tommy Leach	Pittsburgh Pirates	1902	(1)
25	Sam Crawford	Detroit Tigers	1903	(9)
36	Chief Wilson	Pittsburgh Pirates	1912	current

=== Three or more seasons with 20 triples ===
Player	Years	Seasons & Teams
Sam Crawford	5	1902 Cincinnati; 1903, 1912–14 Detroit
Ty Cobb	4	1908, 1911–12, 1917 Detroit
Harry Stovey	3	1883, 1888 Philadelphia Athletics (AA); 1891 Boston (NL)
Roger Connor	3	1886–87 New York (NL); 1894 St. Louis (NL)
Dan Brouthers	3	1887 Detroit (NL); 1892 Brooklyn; 1894 Baltimore (NL)
Sam Thompson	3	1887 Detroit (NL); 1894–95 Philadelphia (NL)
Jimmy Williams	3	1899 Pittsburgh; 1901–02 Baltimore
Joe Jackson	3	1912 Cleveland; 1916, 1920 Chicago (AL)
Earle Combs	3	1927–28, 1930 New York (AL)

=== Six or more seasons with 15 triples ===
Player	Years	Seasons & Teams
Sam Crawford	13	1900–02 Cincinnati; 1903–04, 1906–08, 1910, 1912–15 Detroit
Roger Connor	9	1882 Troy (NL); 1883, 1885–90 New York (NL); 1894 St. Louis (NL)
Dan Brouthers	7	1883–84 Buffalo (NL); 1886–87 Detroit (NL); 1891 Boston (AA); 1892 Brooklyn; 1894 Baltimore (NL)
Jake Beckley	7	1890 Pittsburgh (PL); 1891–95 Pittsburgh; 1899 Cincinnati
Elmer Flick	7	1900–01 Philadelphia (NL); 1903–07 Cleveland
Honus Wagner	7	1900, 1902–03, 1908, 1911–12, 1915 Pittsburgh
Ty Cobb	7	1908, 1911–13, 1917, 1921–22 Detroit
Paul Waner	7	1926–30, 1933–34 Pittsburgh
Joe Kelley	6	1893–96, 1898 Baltimore (NL); 1900 Brooklyn
Ed Delahanty	6	1892–94, 1896–97, 1901 Philadelphia (NL)
Joe Jackson	6	1911–13 Cleveland; 1916–17, 1920 Chicago (AL)

=== Four or more consecutive seasons with 15 triples ===
Player	Years	Seasons & Teams
Roger Connor	6	1885–90 New York
Jake Beckley	6	1890 Pittsburgh (PL); 1891–95 Pittsburgh
Sam Crawford	5	1900–02 Cincinnati; 1903–04 Detroit
Elmer Flick	5	1903–07 Cleveland
Goose Goslin	5	1923–27 Washington (AL)
Paul Waner	5	1926–30 Pittsburgh
Bill Kuehne	4	1884 Columbus (AA); 1885–87 Pittsburgh
Joe Kelley	4	1893–96, 1898 Baltimore (NL)
Buck Freeman	4	1901–04 Boston (AL)
Sam Crawford	4	1912–15 Detroit
George Sisler	4	1919–22 St. Louis (AL)
Earle Combs	4	1927–30 New York (AL)

=== Twelve or more seasons with 10 triples ===
Player	Years	Seasons & Teams
Sam Crawford	17	1900–02 Cincinnati; 1903–16 Detroit
Ty Cobb	17	1907–19, 1921–22, 1924–25 Detroit
Jake Beckley	14	1889, 1891–95 Pittsburgh; 1890 Pittsburgh (PL); 1897 New York (NL)–Cincinnati; 1898–1901, 1903 Cincinnati; 1905 St. Louis (NL)
Fred Clarke	14	1896–98 Louisville (NL); 1900–09, 1911 Pittsburgh
Honus Wagner	13	1899 Louisville (NL); 1900–05, 1907–09, 1911–12, 1915 Pittsburgh
Tris Speaker	13	1909–15 Boston (AL); 1917–21, 1923 Cleveland
Eddie Collins	12	1909–14 Philadelphia (AL); 1915–17, 1920–22 Chicago (AL)

=== Eight or more consecutive seasons with 10 triples ===
Player	Years	Seasons & Teams
Sam Crawford	17	1900–02 Cincinnati; 1903–16 Detroit
Ty Cobb	13	1907–19 Detroit
Mike Tiernan	10	1889–98 New York (NL)
Elmer Flick	10	1898–1901 Philadelphia (NL); 02 Philadelphia (AL)–Cleveland; 1903–07 Cleveland
Fred Clarke	10	1900–09 Pittsburgh
Bobby Veach	10	1913–22 Detroit
Sam Rice	10	1921–30 Washington (AL)
Paul Waner	10	1926–35 Pittsburgh
Eddie Collins	9	1909–14 Philadelphia (AL); 1915–17 Chicago (AL)
Earle Combs	9	1925–33 New York (AL)
Roger Connor	8	1885–91 New York (NL); 1892 Philadelphia (NL)
Ed McKean	8	1890–97 Cleveland (NL)
Heinie Manush	8	1927 Detroit; 1928–29 St. Louis (AL); 1930 St. Louis (AL)-Washington (AL); 1931–34 Washington (AL)

== League leader in triples ==
=== League leader in triples 4 or more seasons ===
Player	Titles	Seasons & Teams
Sam Crawford	6	1902 Cincinnati; 1903, 1910, 1913–15 Detroit
Stan Musial	5	1943, 1946, 1948–49, 1951 St. Louis-NL
Willie Wilson	5	1980, 1982, 1985, 1987–88 Kansas City
Lance Johnson	5	1991–94 Chicago (AL); 1996 New York (NL)
Harry Stovey	4	1880 Worcester Brown Stockings, 1884, 1888 Philadelphia Athletics (AA), 1891 Boston Beaneaters
Ty Cobb	4	1908, 1911, 1917–18 Detroit
Brett Butler	4	1983 Atlanta; 1986 Cleveland; 1994 Los Angeles (NL); 1995 Los Angeles (NL)-New York (NL)
Jimmy Rollins	4	2001–02, 2004, 2007 Philadelphia-NL
Carl Crawford	4	2004–06, 2010 Tampa Bay
Corbin Carroll	4	2023–26 Arizona

=== League leader in triples 3 or more consecutive seasons ===
Player	Titles	Seasons & Teams
Lance Johnson	4	1991–94 Chicago (AL)
Corbin Carroll	4	2023–26 Arizona
Elmer Flick	3	1905–07 Cleveland
Sam Crawford	3	1913–15 Detroit
Garry Templeton	3	1977–79 St. Louis (NL)
Carl Crawford	3	2004–06 Tampa Bay

=== League leader in triples in both leagues ===
Player	Titles	Seasons & Teams
Sam Crawford	6	1902 Cincinnati; 1903, 1910, 1913–15 Detroit
Brett Butler	4	1983 Atlanta; 1986 Cleveland; 1994 Los Angeles (NL); 1995 Los Angeles (NL)-New York (NL)
Lance Johnson	5	1991–94 Chicago (AL); 1996 New York (NL)

== 4+ triples by an individual in one game ==
Triples	Player	Team	Date	Opponent
4	George Strief	Philadelphia Athletics (AA)	June 25, 1885	Brooklyn Grays
4	Bill Joyce	New York Giants	May 18, 1897	Pittsburgh Pirates

== 110 triples by a team in one season ==
Triples	Team	Season
131	Philadelphia Phillies	1894
130	Brooklyn Grooms	1894
129	Pittsburgh Pirates	1912
127	Pittsburgh Pirates	1893
124	Pittsburgh Pirates	1894
122	Pittsburgh Pirates	1924
121	Pittsburgh Pirates	1899
120	Cincinnati Reds	1890
120	Cincinnati Reds	1926
119	Pittsburgh Pirates	1930
116	Pittsburgh Pirates	1929
113	St. Louis Cardinals	1894
113	Boston Pilgrims	1903
111	Pittsburgh Pirates	1923
111	Cincinnati Reds	1924
110	Pittsburgh Pirates	1903
110	Pittsburgh Pirates	1922
110	New York Yankees	1930

== See also ==
- 20–20–20 club
- List of Major League Baseball annual triples leaders

== Notes ==
1. Total includes one season in the Players' League. Major League Baseball recognizes this year of service, but this is not universally recognized by all historians. He hit 22 triples that season, giving him a National League career total of 221.
2. Total includes 28 triples in his two years in the Players' League and American Association, giving 177 triples in his National League career.
3. Total includes 76 triples in his 8 seasons with Cincinnati while they were in the American Association, giving 112 triples in his National League career.
4. Total includes 13 triples in his one year in the Players' League, giving 172 triples in his National League career.
5. Total includes 18 triples in his one year in the Federal League, giving 164 triples in his National League career.
6. Total includes 15 triples in his one year in the Federal League, giving 167 triples in his Major League career.
7. The 1901–1903 records for a single season are included because some historians do not recognize any record set prior to the "modern era" which began in 1901.
