= Chief Wilson =

American baseball player (1883–1954)

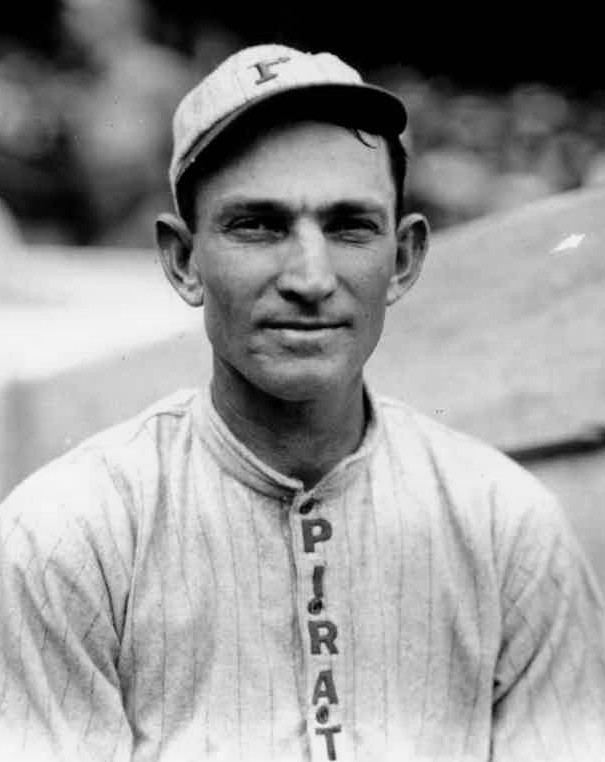
- Wilson in 1912
- Outfielder
- Born: August 21, 1883; Austin, Texas, U.S.
- Died: February 22, 1954 (aged 70); Bertram, Texas, U.S.
- Batted: Left Threw: Right

MLB debut
- April 15, 1908, for the Pittsburgh Pirates

Last MLB appearance
- October 1, 1916, for the St. Louis Cardinals

MLB statistics
- Batting average: .269
- Triples: 114
- Home runs: 59
- Runs batted in: 571
- Stats at Baseball Reference

Teams
- Pittsburgh Pirates (1908–1913); St. Louis Cardinals (1914–1916)

Career highlights and awards
- World Series champion (1909); NL RBI leader (1911); MLB record: 36 triples, single season (1912)

John Owen "Chief" Wilson (August 21, 1883 – February 22, 1954) was an American professional baseball right fielder. He played in Major League Baseball from 1908 to 1916 for the Pittsburgh Pirates and St. Louis Cardinals.

Wilson played minor league baseball for three teams until the end of 1907, when he signed with the Pirates. After spending six seasons with the organization, he was traded to the Cardinals, where he spent the last three seasons of his major league career.

Wilson is best known for recording 36 triples in 1912, surpassing Dave Orr's 1886 mark to set a single-season record that, as of 2026, still stands.

== Early life ==
Wilson was born on August 21, 1883, in Austin, Texas. He grew up at a ranch owned by his family located approximately 50 miles north of Austin in Bertram. Wilson started his baseball career playing on several teams in independent leagues, before joining the Austin Senators in 1905. He was known for his introverted nature; his Pirates teammate and roommate Bobby Byrne recounted how Wilson "wouldn't say two words all day."

Contrary to popular belief, Wilson was not of Native American descent. He was nicknamed "Chief" because his Pittsburgh teammates and manager Fred Clarke thought Wilson, a native Texan who stood 6 feet 2 inches (1.88 m), resembled a "Chief of the Texas Rangers."

== Professional baseball career ==
=== Minor leagues ===
In 1905, Wilson signed with the Austin Senators, a minor league baseball team in the Texas League. However, the team disbanded in the middle of the season on June 6, and Wilson joined the Fort Worth Panthers, playing for them until he was promoted to the Des Moines Champs of the Western League in 1907. He performed well, posting a batting average of .323 in 56 games. It was during his first (and only) season with the Champs that Wilson was spotted by Denver Grizzlies pitcher Babe Adams, who had signed with the Pittsburgh Pirates at the end of 1907. Adams informed Pirates owner Barney Dreyfuss of Wilson's "tremendous arm" and his ability "not only as a hitter but as a fielder." This prompted Dreyfuss to sign Wilson to the Pirates as their right fielder.

=== Pittsburgh Pirates (1908–1913) ===
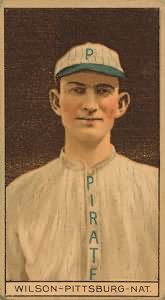
A 1912 T207 baseball card depicting Wilson

Wilson made his major league debut for the Pirates on April 15, 1908, at the age of 24, in a 3–1 Opening Day win against the St. Louis Cardinals. During his 1908 rookie season, Wilson had a relatively disappointing year, batting .227, slugging .285 and finishing sixth in the National League (NL) in strikeouts with 66. Out of his 120 hits that season, only 18 were extra base hits. As a result of his offensive woes, Pirates fans booed him on a constant basis. Wilson greatly improved his batting in the following season, raising his batting average to .272, playing all 154 games of the season and finishing fifth in the NL in triples with 12. This success culminated in the Pirates winning the World Series at the conclusion of that season. In the Opening Day game of the 1910 season, Wilson got injured and had to sit out for seven games, with Vin Campbell taking his place in the lineup. On July 3, against the Cincinnati Reds, he hit for the cycle. He finished the season with similar statistics as the previous year, batting .276 and hitting 13 triples.

The 1911 season was a breakout year for Wilson. He posted a batting average of .300, finished third in the NL in doubles (34), fifth in home runs (12) and sixth in slugging (.472) and drove in 107 runs batted in (RBI), thus becoming the league's RBI champion. The 12 home runs he hit that season marked a Pirates team record he held until 1925.

In 1912, Wilson recorded the same batting average as the year before and finished second in the league in slugging (.513) and games played (152), third in home runs (11), fourth in RBI (95) and seventh in hits (175). Furthermore, he set the MLB single-season record for triples, hitting 36 in total that year. However, his record received almost no press coverage. Baseball sportswriter Ernest Lanigan suggested that this was because a record book erroneously attributed Nap Lajoie with having 44 triples in 1903, when he hit only 11 that year. As a result, several newspapers – most notably The Pittsburgh Press – were under the belief that Lajoie held the record.

Wilson's record still stands today and is currently the third oldest single-season record, behind Lajoie's .426 batting average in 1901 and Jack Chesbro's 41 wins in 1904. It is considered one of baseball's most unbreakable records, as only Sam Crawford (1914) and Kiki Cuyler (1925) have come the closest to breaking the record; both players hit 26 triples. Wilson's record also accounted for part of the 129 triples amassed by the Pirates that year, setting a single-season record for most triples by a team since 1900. Due to his stellar and record-breaking performance, Wilson finished eighth in that season's voting for the Chalmers Award, the precursor to the MLB Most Valuable Player Award.

=== St. Louis Cardinals (1914–1916) ===
Wilson finished his career playing three seasons for the Cardinals. He played his last MLB game on October 1, 1916.

== Later life ==
After he retired from baseball, Wilson returned to his family ranch in Bertram, where he became a stock farmer and held various positions in service to the community. He died on October 24, 1954, at the age of 70 and was interred at Austin Memorial Park. On March 31, 2007, the Bertram Little League Sports Complex was dedicated to and named after Wilson.

== See also ==
- List of Major League Baseball career triples leaders
- List of Major League Baseball annual runs batted in leaders
- List of Major League Baseball annual triples leaders
- List of Major League Baseball single-season triples leaders
- List of Major League Baseball triples records
- List of Major League Baseball players to hit for the cycle

Achievements
Preceded by Heinie Reitz	Single-season triples record holder 1912 – present	Succeeded by Incumbent
Preceded by Otis Clymer	Hitting for the cycle July 3, 1910	Succeeded by Danny Murphy
