= Lloyd Waner =

American baseball player (1906–1982)

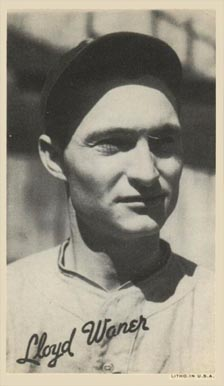
- Center fielder
- Born: March 16, 1906; Harrah, Oklahoma, U.S.
- Died: July 22, 1982 (aged 76); Oklahoma City, Oklahoma, U.S.
- Batted: Left Threw: Right

MLB debut
- April 12, 1927, for the Pittsburgh Pirates

Last MLB appearance
- September 16, 1945, for the Pittsburgh Pirates

MLB statistics
- Batting average: .316
- Hits: 2,459
- Home runs: 27
- Runs batted in: 598
- Stats at Baseball Reference

Teams
- Pittsburgh Pirates (1927–1941); Boston Braves (1941); Cincinnati Reds (1941); Philadelphia Phillies (1942); Brooklyn Dodgers (1944); Pittsburgh Pirates (1944–1945)

Career highlights and awards
- All-Star (1938); Pittsburgh Pirates Hall of Fame

Member of the National

Baseball Hall of Fame
- Induction: 1967
- Election method: Veterans Committee

Lloyd James Waner (March 16, 1906 – July 22, 1982), nicknamed "Little Poison", was an American Major League Baseball (MLB) center fielder. His small stature at 5 ft 9 in (1.75 m) and 132 lb (60 kg) made him one of the smallest players of his era. Along with his brother, Paul Waner, he anchored the Pittsburgh Pirates outfield throughout the 1920s and 1930s. After brief stints with four other teams late in his career, Waner retired as a Pirate.

Waner finished with a batting average over .300 in ten seasons. He earned a selection to the MLB All-Star Game in 1938. Lloyd and Paul Waner set the record for career hits by brothers in MLB. He was elected into the National Baseball Hall of Fame by the Veterans Committee in 1967. He worked as a scout for the Pirates and the Baltimore Orioles after retiring as a player.

== Early life ==
Waner was born on March 16, 1906, in Harrah, Oklahoma, and grew up on a farm with his older brother, Paul. The two worked from dawn to dusk every day, and baseball was their only form of entertainment. Influenced by their father, who was a minor league player in Oklahoma City, Paul and Lloyd's love and natural talent for the game developed over the years. The Waners learned to hit against corncobs and cut down saplings in the woods to use as bats. After graduating from high school, Lloyd attended three semesters at East Central State Normal School (now East Central University) in Ada, Oklahoma, before going into professional baseball.

Waner started his professional baseball career in 1925 with the San Francisco Seals of the Pacific Coast League, but he hit poorly. He was offered a tryout for the Pittsburg Pirates at the urging of his brother, who had been discovered in Ada by Pirates scout Joe Devine. In 1926, he had a .345 batting average in the Class B South Atlantic League. He also won the league's most valuable player award.

== MLB career ==
=== Early career ===
Waner broke into the major leagues with the Pirates in 1927 and quickly built his reputation as a slap hitter with an astute sense of plate discipline. In his rookie campaign, he batted .355 with 223 hits while only striking out 23 times (the highest strikeout total of his career). As the leadoff hitter of the powerful Pittsburgh offense, he led the National League (NL) with 133 runs scored while only having 27 RBIs. The runs scored mark set an MLB rookie record. Al López said that infielders of the era played deep at their positions, but Waner made them play closer to compensate for his speed as a runner.

The Pirates won the 1927 NL pennant; Waner then batted .400 in his only World Series, but the New York Yankees won in four games. He continued to bat well early in his career. He earned a record-setting 678 hits over his first three seasons (1927–1929), a record that still stands today. Waner finished in the top ten in MVP voting 1927 and 1929.

Coming off a .353 season in 1929, he missed most of the next year due to appendicitis. He had surgery for the condition in the winter. Waner had difficulty recovering from the surgery and re-entered the hospital in May. The Pittsburgh Press reported the fear that he might have to retire.

=== Middle career ===
He returned in 1931 and led the NL with 214 hits and 681 at-bats while hitting .314. Waner hit .333 the next year and finished 13th in MVP voting, but his average dropped to .276 in 1933. Waner's average increased to .283 and then .309 over the next two years, though he did not lead the league in any offensive categories or place in the MVP voting during those seasons. In January 1936, Waner became ill with pneumonia and his condition was initially said to be critical. He recovered and was back on the field by late April. Waner hit between .313 and .330 between 1936 and 1938, earning an MLB All-Star Game selection in 1938.

=== Later career ===
In 1939, he played in just 112 games and had 108 hits while batting .285 with 17 walks to 13 strikeouts. He played in just 72 games in 1940, batting .259 with 43 hits. He was traded on May 7, 1941 to the Boston Braves, who in turn traded him on June 12 to the Cincinnati Reds. He played 77 total games and batted .292 with 12 walks to no strikeouts. He played as a backup outfielder as a signee with the Philadelphia Phillies in 1942, batted .261. Waner initially retired in 1943, taking on a job at the Douglas Aircraft plant in Oklahoma City; he asked the league to be put on the voluntary retirement list. He returned with the Brooklyn Dodgers in 1944, playing a few games with his brother Paul before being released in June. He signed with Pittsburgh to close out the year, where he batted .321 in 34 games. He played in just 23 games of the 1945 season, collecting five total hits. In his final game on September 16, he went 0-for-1.

In September 1945, he asked team president William Benswanger for his release, saying, "The old legs just won't hold up anymore and I'm convinced that I'm through." He compiled a career .316 batting average, batting .300 or higher in ten seasons. He compiled 1 six-hit game, 2 five-hit games and 41 four-hit games in his major league career. Waner was also an accomplished center fielder. He led the league in putouts four times, using his excellent speed to cover the spacious Forbes Field outfield. He recorded a career .983 fielding percentage at that position.

He (2,459) and his older brother Paul (3,152) hold the career record for hits by brothers (5,611), outpacing the three Alou brothers and the three DiMaggio brothers, among others. For most of the period from 1927 to 1940, Paul patrolled right field at Forbes Field while Lloyd covered the ground next to him in center. On September 15, 1938, the brothers hit back-to-back home runs against Cliff Melton of the New York Giants.

Paul was known as "Big Poison" and Lloyd as "Little Poison". They got their nicknames from a Brooklyn Dodgers fan's pronunciation of "Big Person" and "Little Person", which was then picked up by a sportswriter in the stands. In 1927, the season the brothers accumulated 460 hits, the fan is said to have remarked, "Them Waners! It's always the little poison on thoid (third) and the big poison on foist (first)!"

== Later life ==
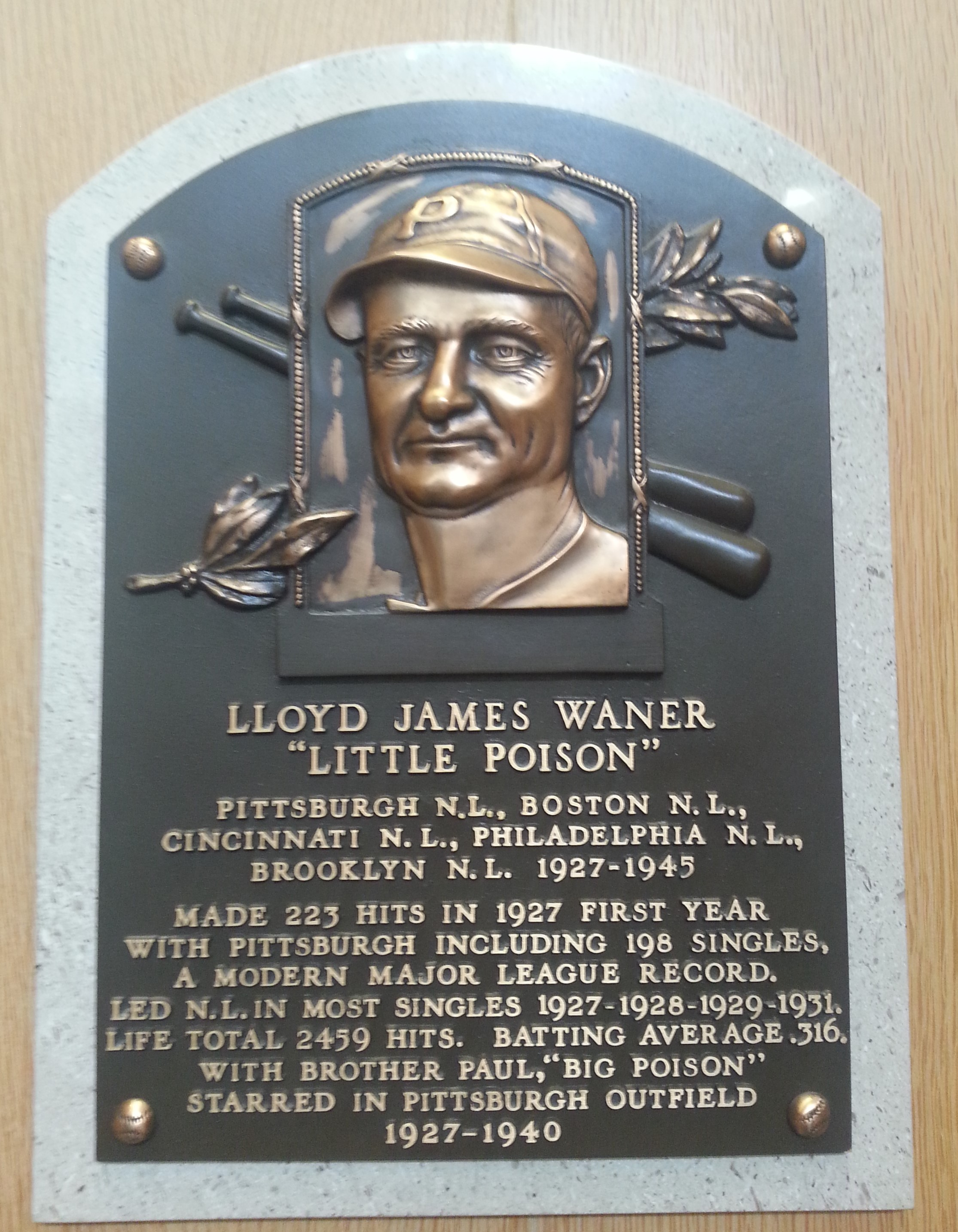
Plaque of Lloyd Waner at the Baseball Hall of Fame

After retiring as a player, Waner was a scout for Pittsburgh from 1946 to 1949. He filled the same role with the Baltimore Orioles in 1955. He worked for the city of Oklahoma City between 1950 and 1967. Lloyd and Paul Waner both struggled with alcohol abuse. Lloyd Waner Jr. said that while Paul "drank like a fish when he was playing ball", Lloyd's drinking intensified after his playing career was over. Lloyd Jr. said that the brothers would have been better known and would have enjoyed their later lives more were it not for alcohol.

In 1950, Lloyd and Paul Waner lost their older brother, Ralph Waner, when he was fatally shot by his ex-wife Marie. Ralph had been eating a steak dinner with his girlfriend when Marie came into the restaurant. Ralph and Marie both became angry. As they started to walk outside, Marie pulled out a gun. Ralph was shot twice, then struggled for the weapon. It went off one more time, injuring Marie. Ralph died a short time later. Ralph had held numerous roles in organized baseball in Pennsylvania.

Waner was inducted into the National Baseball Hall of Fame in 1967. Sabermetrician Bill James has listed Waner as one of ten examples of Hall of Fame inductees who do not deserve the honor. Possible reasons for his selection include his brother being a fellow inductee (Pirates teammate Pie Traynor argued Lloyd was both a great ballplayer and one who played in his brother's shadow) and the inflated batting averages of his era, which helped many players from the 1920s and 1930s in the eyes of the Veterans Committee.

Late in Waner's life, writer Donald Honig asked him about a previous quote in which Waner said that he would have played baseball for free. "I think I would have asked for expenses", Waner reflected. Lloyd gave up drinking in the last four or five years of his life and Lloyd Jr. said that "it was like having a real father around... I'll always treasure that period." In 1982, Waner died of complications related to emphysema. He was survived by his wife Frances and his two children.

== See also ==
- List of Major League Baseball career hits leaders
- List of Major League Baseball career runs scored leaders
- List of Major League Baseball career triples leaders
- List of Major League Baseball single-season triples leaders
- List of Major League Baseball annual runs scored leaders
- List of Major League Baseball annual triples leaders
- List of Major League Baseball single-game hits leaders
