= Dots Miller =

American baseball player (1886–1923)

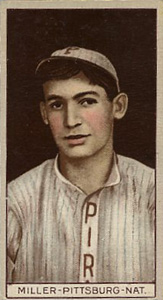
- First baseman / Second baseman
- Born: September 9, 1886; Kearny, New Jersey, U.S.
- Died: September 5, 1923 (aged 36); Saranac Lake, New York, U.S.
- Batted: Right Threw: Right

MLB debut
- April 16, 1909, for the Pittsburgh Pirates

Last MLB appearance
- September 27, 1921, for the Philadelphia Phillies

MLB statistics
- Batting average: .263
- Home runs: 32
- Runs batted in: 714
- Stats at Baseball Reference

Teams
- Pittsburgh Pirates (1909–1913); St. Louis Cardinals (1914–1917, 1919); Philadelphia Phillies (1920–1921)

Career highlights and awards
- World Series champion (1909)

John Barney "Dots" Miller (September 9, 1886 – September 5, 1923) was an American professional baseball first baseman and second baseman. He played in Major League Baseball (MLB) from 1909 through 1921 for the Pittsburgh Pirates, St. Louis Cardinals, and Philadelphia Phillies.

== Career ==
Miller started his major league career with the Pirates. In his rookie season, he drove in 87 runs and helped Pittsburgh win the National League pennant and their first World Series title. Miller was the regular second baseman from 1909 to 1911 but then moved over to first base.

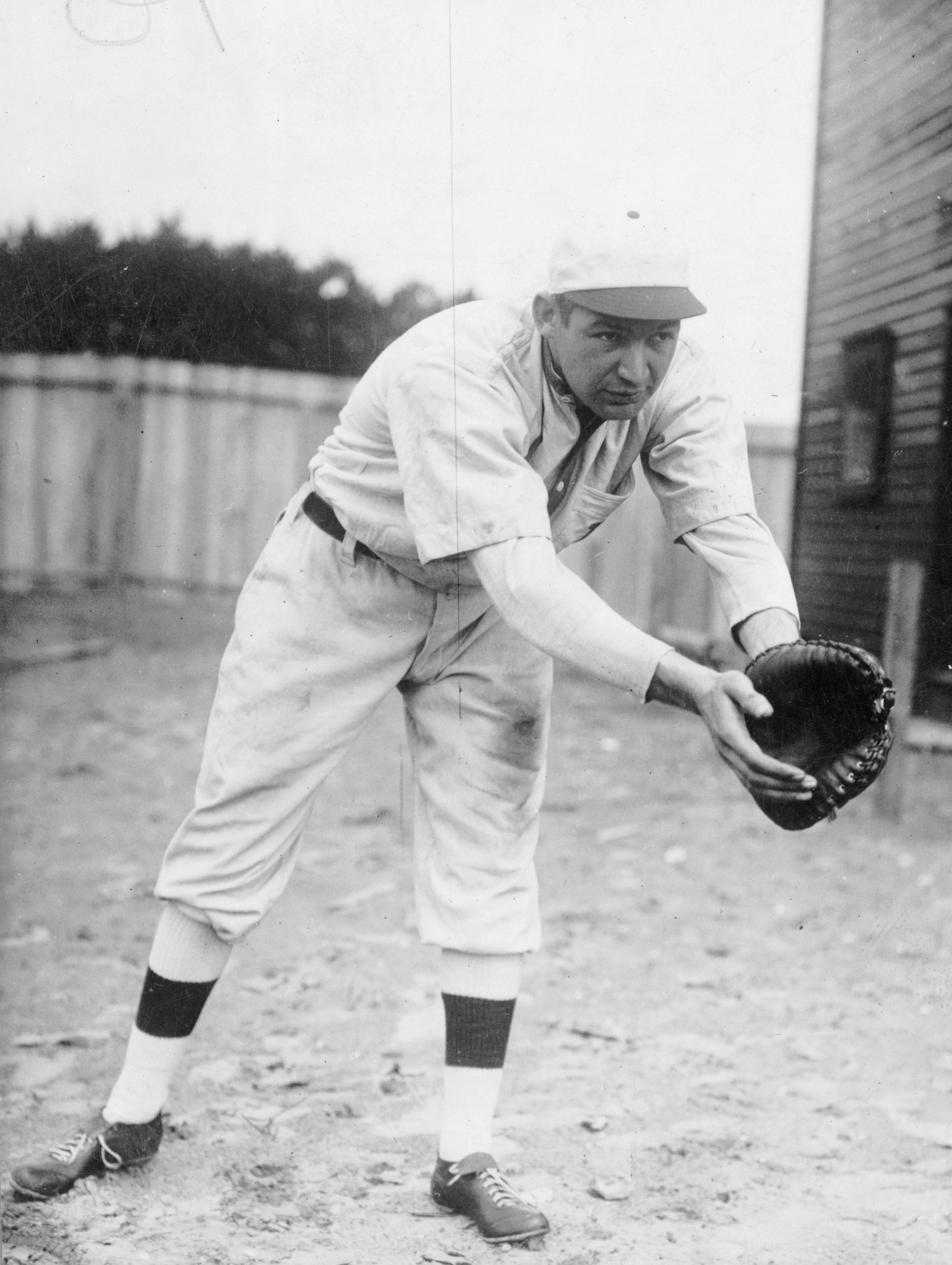
Miller with St. Louis, circa 1914.

In the years since his death (beginning at least as early as a 1935 story penned by one-time Phillies teammate Stan Baumgartner), Miller's nickname has frequently been attributed to a simple misinterpretation of teammate Honus Wagner's heavily accented response, "That's Miller." However, on May 12, 1909, the first day the name "Dots Miller" appeared in a Pittsburgh newspaper, it was made abundantly clear that this was a childhood nickname, stemming from Miller's own German ancestry, and accent. Indeed, this was confirmed in a story published shortly before his death, during his unsuccessful bout with tuberculosis.

In 1913, Miller was traded to the Cardinals, where he continued his good hitting and fielding for the next few years.

In 1918 Miller's career was interrupted while he served in World War I.

Miller became manager of a Pacific Coast League team, the San Francisco Seals, in 1922. He led the club to the pennant in his first year. The following season, the Seals were league with by ten games when, on July 23, Miller was forced to step down after contracting tuberculosis. He died on September 5.

In 1589 games over 12 seasons, Miller posted a .263 batting average (1526-for-5804) with 711 runs, 232 doubles, 108 triples, 32 home runs, 714 RBI, 177 stolen bases, 391 bases on balls, .314 on-base percentage and .357 slugging percentage. He finished his career with a .974 fielding percentage playing at first, second, third base and shortstop. In the 1909 World Series, he hit .250 (7-for-28) with 2 runs, 4 RBI, 3 stolen bases and 2 walks.

== Soccer ==
Miller was also noted as a soccer player.

== See also ==
- List of Major League Baseball career triples leaders
- List of Major League Baseball career stolen bases leaders
