= Bill Keister =

American baseball player (1871–1924)

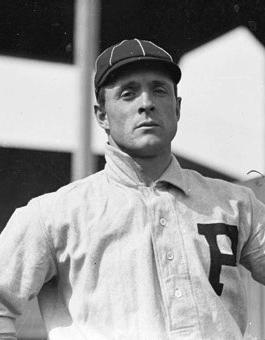
- Keister, c. 1903
- Shortstop / Second Baseman / Right Fielder
- Born: William Hoffman Keister; August 17, 1871; Baltimore, Maryland, US
- Died: August 17, 1924 (aged 53); Baltimore, Maryland, US
- Batted: Left Threw: Right

MLB debut
- May 20, 1896, for the Baltimore Orioles

Last MLB appearance
- August 25, 1903, for the Philadelphia Phillies

MLB statistics
- Batting average: .312
- Home runs: 18
- Runs batted in: 400
- Stats at Baseball Reference

Teams
- Baltimore Orioles (NL) (1896); Boston Beaneaters (1898); Baltimore Orioles (NL) (1899); St. Louis Cardinals (1900); Baltimore Orioles (AL) (1901); Washington Senators (1902); Philadelphia Phillies (1903)

William Hoffman Keister (August 17, 1871 – August 17, 1924) was an American baseball player. He played Major League Baseball from 1896 to 1903, playing shortstop, second baseman, and right fielder.

== Biography ==
Keister was born on August 17, 1871, in Baltimore. Physically, he was 5 ft 5 in (1.65 m) and weighed 168 pounds (76 kg).

Keister debuted in Major League Baseball on May 20, 1896, for the Baltimore Orioles. Throughout his seven-season career, he played shortstop, second baseman, and right fielder. In 1900, he, John McGraw, and Wilbert Robinson, were collectively sold to the St. Louis Cardinals for $15,000. He played for the Orioles in 1896 and 1899; for the Boston Beaneaters in 1898; for the St. Louis Cardinals in 1900; for the American League Orioles in 1901; for the Washington Senators in 1902; and for the Philadelphia Phillies in 1903.

Keister was described as having "terrible fielding" which "more than cancelled out his good bat". In 1901, he held the league record for the worst fielding average, and in that year also tied with Jimmy Williams for that season's triples leader. He would often trash talk despite his lack of skill, which earned him the nickname "Wagon Tongue". Over 621 games, he posted a .312 batting average (758-for-2433) with 400 runs, 133 doubles, 63 triples, 18 home runs, 400 RBI, 131 stolen bases, .349 on-base percentage and .440 slugging percentage.

On July 19, 1899, Keister fought Tommy Corcoran, grabbing and throwing him to the ground to stop him from fighting John McGraw; both were ejected from the game by umpiee Thomas Lynch. In a practice game, he bumped into McGraw as they both ran for the ball, with Keister telling him to stay out of his domain. On April 26, 1900, he punched Billy Clingman in the eye, causing Clingman to drop the ball, preventing a pickoff from succeeding. In one game, he and Joe McGinnity attacked umpire Tom Connolly. Police escorted Connolly from the field, during which a clerk punched him. The clerk was fined $20 and Keister was fined $1 for using profanity in the courtroom, while McGinnity's case was dismissed.

In August 1903, Keister missed a catch, after which he told manager Billy Murray that he had just wiped sweat off of his forehead, making his grip slippery. He played his last game with the MLB a week later, on August 25. He was released from the team, after which he played for the Jersey City Skeeters, of Minor League Baseball. He later played for the Wilkes-Barre, being released on February 12, 1910. On February 7, 1912, Keister signed to the Hill City Howlers.

Keister died on August 17, 1924, aged 52, in Baltimore, and was buried at Loudon Park Cemetery, in Baltimore.

== See also ==
- List of Major League Baseball annual triples leaders
