= Triple (baseball) =

Three-base hit in baseball and softball

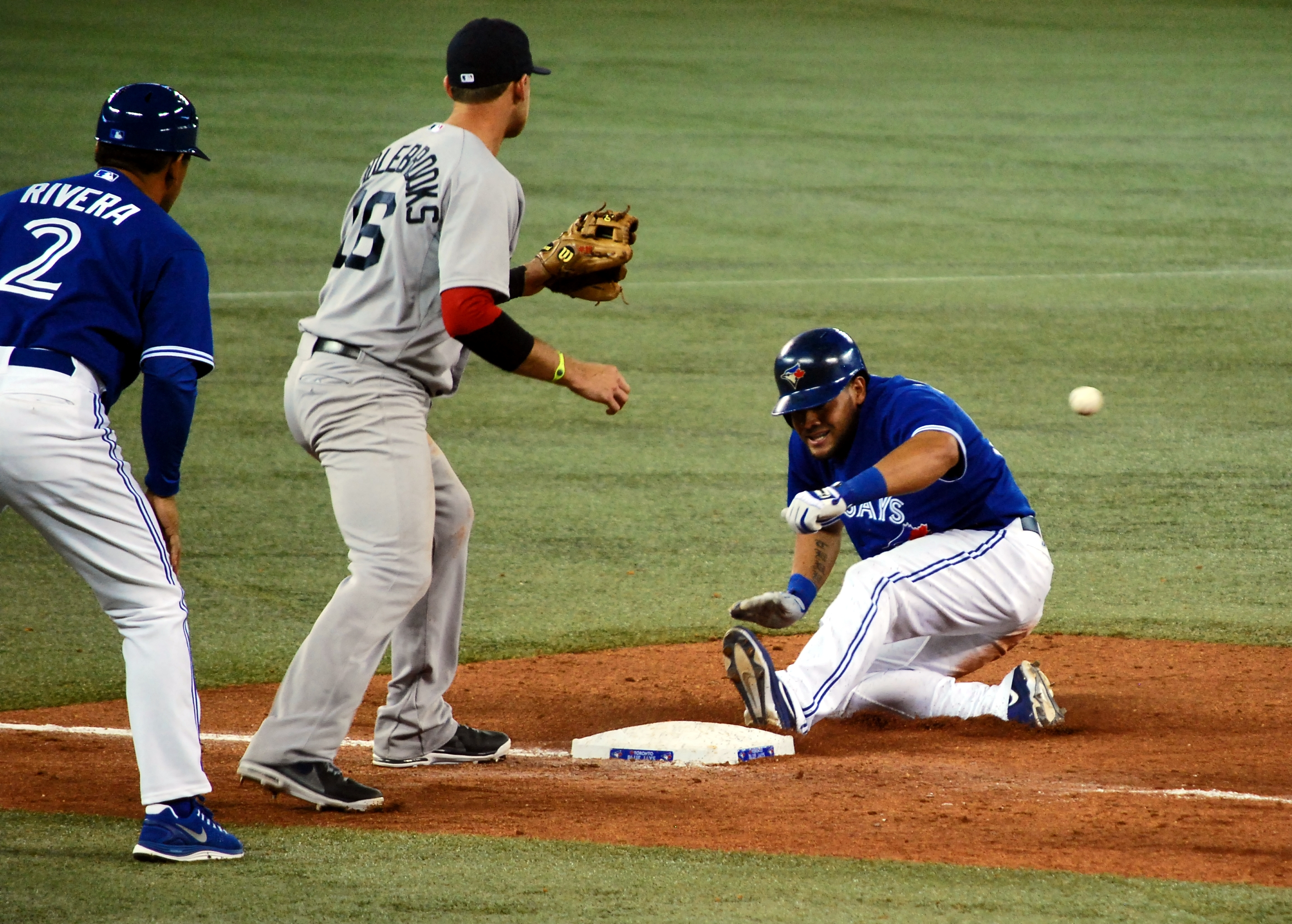
Melky Cabrera (right) of the Toronto Blue Jays slides into third base for a triple during a game in 2013

In baseball, a triple is the act of a batter safely reaching third base after hitting the ball without the benefit of a fielder's misplay (see error) or a fielder's choice. A triple is sometimes called a "three-bagger" or "three-base hit". For statistical and scorekeeping purposes it is denoted as 3B.

Triples have become somewhat rare in Major League Baseball, less common than both the double and the (outside-the-park) home run. This is because a triple requires a ball to be hit solidly to a distant part of the field (ordinarily a line drive or fly ball near the foul line closest to right field), or the ball to take an irregular bounce in the outfield, usually against the wall, away from a fielder. It also requires the batter's team to have a good strategic reason for wanting the batter on third base, as a stand-up double is sufficient to put the batter in scoring position and there will often be little strategic advantage to risk being tagged out whilst trying to stretch a double into a triple (although reaching third base with fewer than two outs could potentially allow the runner to reach home plate on a sacrifice fly). On the extreme, the triple may be stretched into the very rare inside-the-park home run. The trend for modern ballparks is to have smaller outfields (generally increasing the number of home runs which are hit out of the park), ensuring that the career and season triples leaders mostly consist of those who played early in Major League Baseball history, particularly in the dead-ball era. Another factor that may have contributed to the decrease of triples is the shift from speed to power as the most important factor in batting in the modern era.

A walk-off triple (one that ends a game) occurs very infrequently. In general, game-winning hits with a runner on first base are walk-off doubles, since it is quite common for runners starting on first base to score on a double (as it is to make it from first to third on a single). For example, in 2019, there was not a single walk-off triple.

== Triples leaders, Major League Baseball ==
=== Career ===
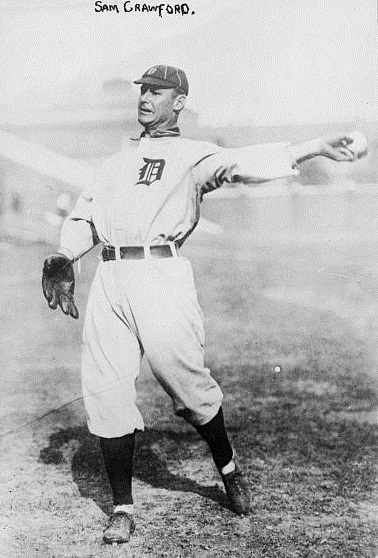
Sam Crawford, who played from 1899 to 1917, hit 309 triples in his career, more than any other player in Major League Baseball history.

Play	Career length	Number of triples
Sam Crawford	1899–1917	309
Ty Cobb	1905–1928	295
Honus Wagner	1897–1917	252
Jake Beckley	1888–1907	243
Roger Connor	1880–1897	233
Tris Speaker	1907–1928	222
Fred Clarke	1894–1915	220
Dan Brouthers	1879–1904	205
Joe Kelley	1891–1908	194
Paul Waner	1926–1945	191

=== Season ===
Chief Wilson holds the record with 36 triples in a season.

Player	Year	Number of triples
Chief Wilson	1912	36
Dave Orr	1886	31
Heinie Reitz	1894	31
Perry Werden	1893	29
Harry Davis	1897	28
Jimmy Williams	1899	28
George Davis	1893	27
Sam Thompson	1894	27
Sam Crawford	1914	26
Kiki Cuyler	1925	26
Joe Jackson	1912	26
John Reilly	1890	26
George Treadway	1894	26

== See also ==
- Single (baseball)
- Double (baseball)
- Home Run
- List of Major League Baseball career triples leaders
- List of Major League Baseball triples records
- List of Major League Baseball single-season triples leaders
