= Danny Murphy (second baseman) =

American baseball player (1876–1955)

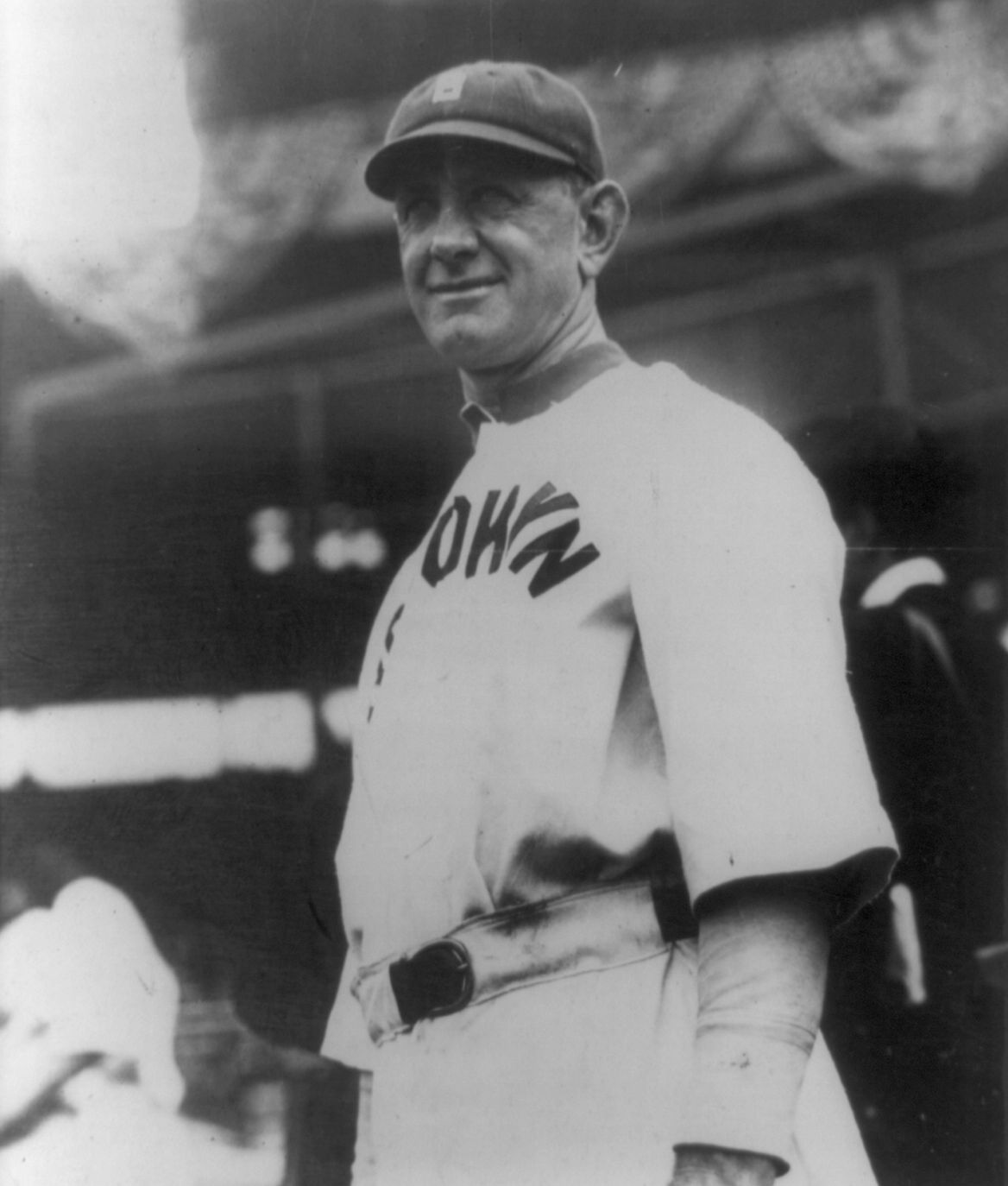
- Second baseman / Right fielder
- Born: August 11, 1876; Philadelphia, Pennsylvania, U.S.
- Died: November 22, 1955 (aged 79); Jersey City, New Jersey, U.S.
- Batted: Right Threw: Right

MLB debut
- September 17, 1900, for the New York Giants

Last MLB appearance
- July 1, 1915, for the Brooklyn Tip-Tops

MLB statistics
- Batting average: .289
- Home runs: 44
- Runs batted in: 702
- Stats at Baseball Reference

Teams
- New York Giants (1900–1901); Philadelphia Athletics (1902–1913); Brooklyn Tip-Tops (1914–1915)

Career highlights and awards
- 3× World Series champion (1910, 1911, 1913)

Daniel Francis Murphy (August 11, 1876 – November 22, 1955) was an American second baseman and outfielder in Major League Baseball from 1900 to 1915.

== Biography ==
Murphy spent most of his career with the Philadelphia Athletics and moved from second base to outfielder in 1910 to make room for the Athletics' new second baseman Eddie Collins. During the Athletics 1913 World Championship season, Murphy's playing time was limited by a broken knee cap; as a result, he did not play in the World Series, but served as the team's acting captain.

In 1,496 games, Murphy batted .289 (1563-5399) with 705 runs scored, 289 doubles, 102 triples, 44 home runs, 702 RBI, 193 stolen bases,, an on-base percentage of .336 and a slugging percentage of .405 in 16 seasons. In 16 World Series games, he hit .305 (18-59) with one home run and 12 RBI.

== See also ==
- List of Major League Baseball career stolen bases leaders
- List of Major League Baseball career triples leaders
- List of Major League Baseball players to hit for the cycle
- List of Major League Baseball single-game hits leaders

Achievements
Preceded by Chief Wilson	Hitting for the cycle August 25, 1910	Succeeded by Bill Collins
