= List of Major League Baseball career triples leaders =

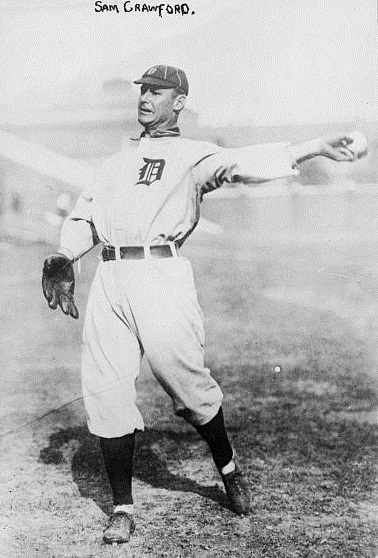
Sam Crawford retired in 1917 with 309 triples, the major league record.

In baseball, a triple is a hit in which the batter advances to third base in one play, with neither the benefit of a fielding error nor another runner being put out on a fielder's choice. Triples were more common in baseball's dead-ball era, when teams relied more on stolen bases and hit and run plays than on the home run. More distant fences in old ballparks, such as Pittsburgh's Forbes Field and Detroit's Tiger Stadium, also produced fewer home runs and more triples on well-hit balls. As a result, most of the players on this list have been retired for decades. Only two players in the top 50 all-time career triples leaders played after WWII (Stan Musial and Roberto Clemente), and there are no players in the top 50 who played after 1972.

In 2006, the Hardball Times lamented the decline of the 100-triple player, although three have joined the list since that time. Fangraphs, a statistical website, likewise noted the lack of modern 100-triple hitters in 2013. Of the 162 Major League Baseball players who have hit 100 or more triples, 69 are members of Baseball's Hall of Fame.

Hall of Famer Sam Crawford of the Detroit Tigers holds the Major League Baseball triples record, with 309. Second to him is his Tigers teammate, Ty Cobb, with 295, the American League record. Honus Wagner is third with 252, the National League record. Jake Beckley (243), Roger Connor (233), Tris Speaker (222), Fred Clarke (220), and Dan Brouthers (205) are the only other players to have hit at least 200 triples. No player whose entire career was in the post-1920 live-ball era has 200 triples; among those players, Paul Waner is the leader with 191. Only triples hit during the regular season are included in the totals (George Brett, Rafael Furcal, and Derek Jeter are tied for the record in post-season triples, with five).

Jim O'Rourke was the first player to reach the 100-triple mark, doing so with the New York Giants in 1886. With Kenny Lofton's retirement after the 2007 season, 2008 was the first season since 1885 in which no active player had more than 100 triples. Carl Crawford hit his 100th triple in 2010, becoming the only active player on the list at that time. José Reyes became the latest player to reach the 100 triple plateau, doing so on April 8, 2012.

When Reyes retired after the 2018 season, Major League Baseball once again had no active player with 100 career triples. The active career triples leader is Corbin Carroll with 60 career triples as of September 23, 2026. He is currently tied for 521st on the all-time list.

== Key ==
| Triples | Total career triples |
| First MLB season | First year in which the player was active |
| Last MLB season | Last year in which the player was active |
| * | Denotes elected to National Baseball Hall of Fame. |
| **Bold** | Denotes active player. (Note: A player is considered inactive if he has announced his retirement or not played for a full season.) |

== Leaders ==
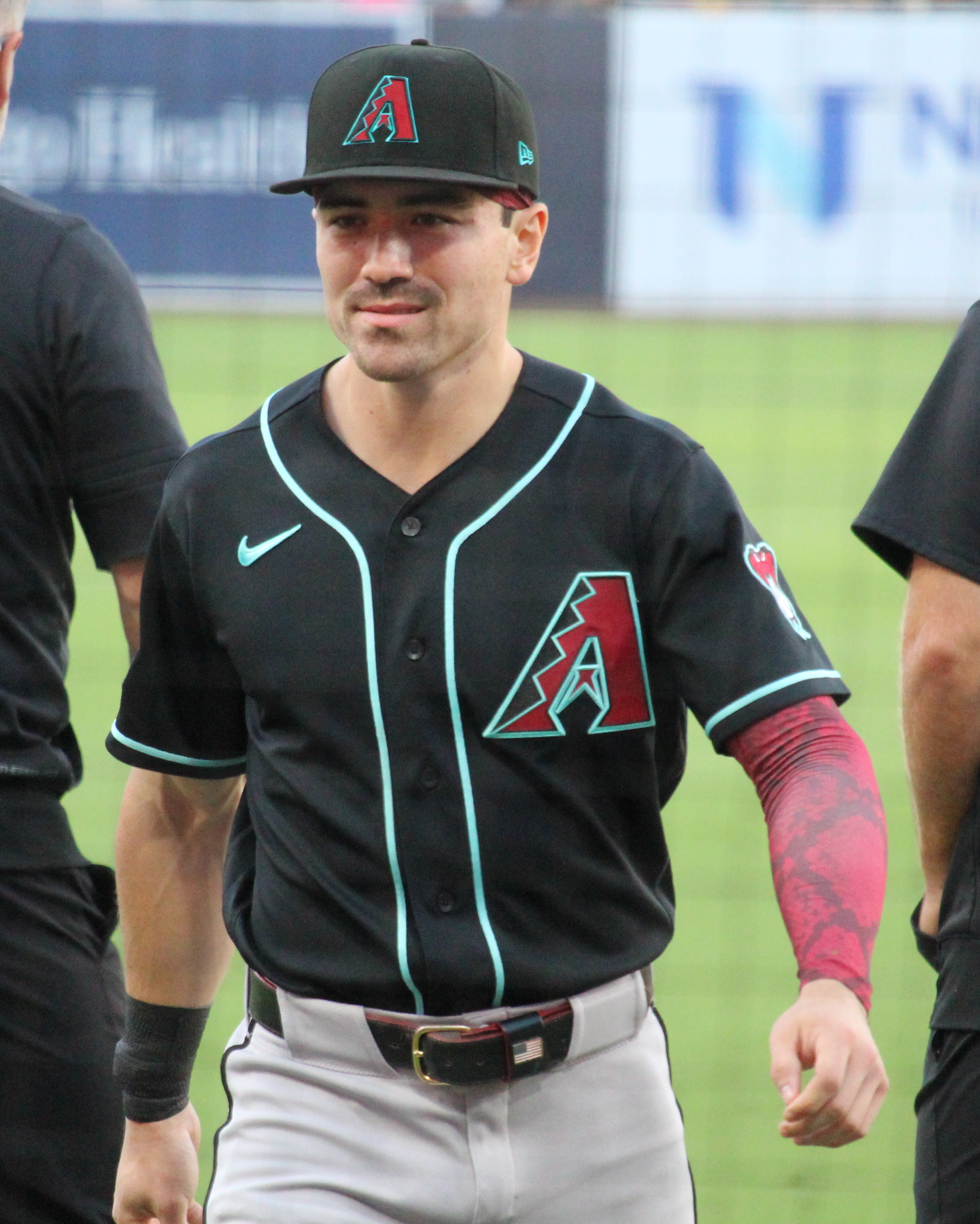
Corbin Carroll is the active leader in triples with 60.

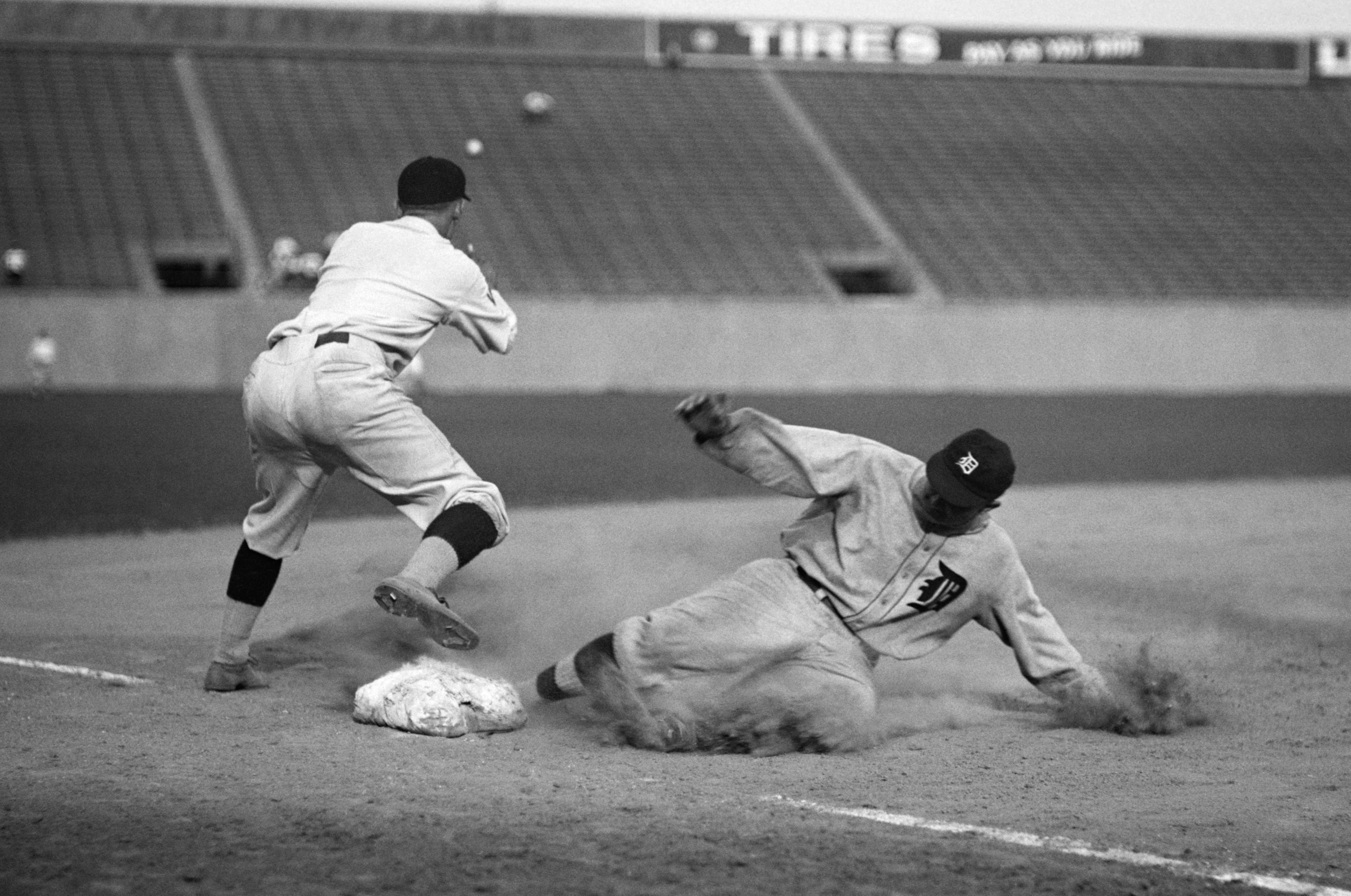
Ty Cobb, sliding into third base, ranks second all-time in career triples with 295.

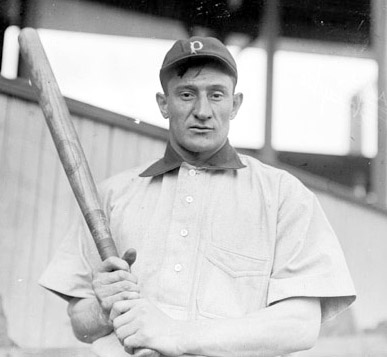
Honus Wagner holds the National League record for triples with 252 and is third overall in major league history.

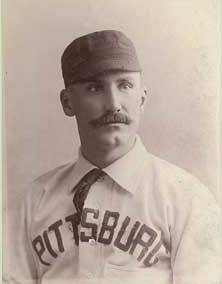
Jake Beckley hit 244 triples between 1888 and 1906.

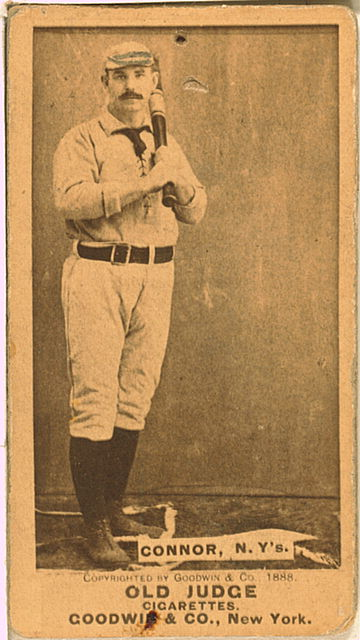
Roger Connor hit 233 triples between 1880 and 1897.

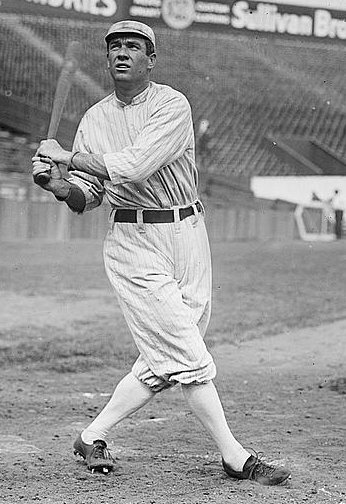
Tris Speaker hit 222 triples in his 21-year career.

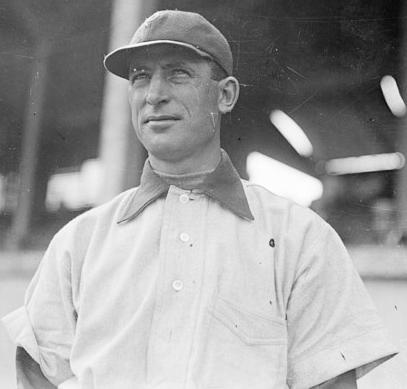
Fred Clarke hit 220 triples between 1894 and 1915.

John "Chief" Wilson hit a record 36 triples in the 1912 season, retiring with 114 total.

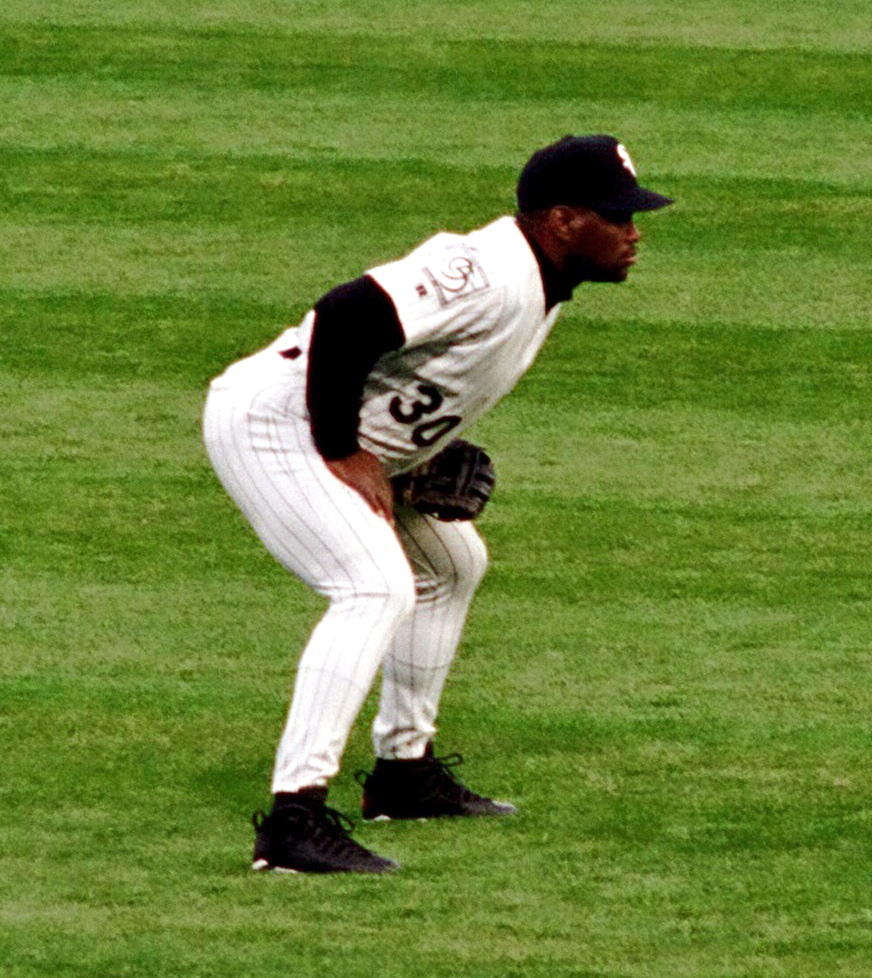
Tim Raines is the most recent player with 100 or more career triples to have been elected to the Baseball Hall of Fame (elected in 2017).

- Stats updated through September 22, 2026.

Players with 100 or more triples
| Rank | Player | Triples | First MLB season | Last MLB season | Ref |
|---|---|---|---|---|---|
| 1 | Sam Crawford* | 309 (Note: Some sources, including the Hall of Fame, give Crawford's career total as 312. See "Sam Crawford". The Hall of Famers. National Baseball Hall of Fame and Museum, Inc. Archived from the original on 2011-07-17.) | 1899 | 1917 | |
| 2 | Ty Cobb* | 295 | 1905 | 1928 | |
| 3 | Honus Wagner* | 252 | 1897 | 1917 | |
| 4 | Jake Beckley* | 244 | 1888 | 1907 | |
| 5 | Roger Connor* | 233 | 1880 | 1897 | |
| 6 | Tris Speaker* | 222 | 1907 | 1928 | |
| 7 | Fred Clarke* | 220 | 1894 | 1915 | |
| 8 | Dan Brouthers* | 205 | 1879 | 1904 | |
| 9 | Joe Kelley* | 194 | 1891 | 1908 | |
| 10 | Paul Waner* | 191 | 1926 | 1945 | |
| 11 | Bid McPhee* | 188 | 1882 | 1899 | |
| 12 | Eddie Collins* | 187 | 1906 | 1930 | |
| 13 | Ed Delahanty* | 185 | 1888 | 1903 | |
| 14 | Sam Rice* | 184 | 1890 | 1915 | |
| 15 | Jesse Burkett* | 182 | 1890 | 1905 | |
| | Ed Konetchy | 182 | 1907 | 1921 | |
| | Edd Roush* | 182 | 1913 | 1931 | |
| 18 | Buck Ewing* | 178 | 1880 | 1897 | |
| 19 | Rabbit Maranville* | 177 | 1912 | 1935 | |
| | Stan Musial* | 177 | 1941 | 1963 | |
| 21 | Harry Stovey | 174 | 1880 | 1893 | |
| 22 | Goose Goslin* | 173 | 1921 | 1938 | |
| 23 | Tommy Leach | 172 | 1898 | 1918 | |
| | Zack Wheat* | 172 | 1909 | 1927 | |
| 25 | Rogers Hornsby* | 169 | 1915 | 1937 | |
| 26 | Joe Jackson | 168 | 1908 | 1920 | |
| 27 | Roberto Clemente* | 166 | 1955 | 1972 | |
| | Sherry Magee | 166 | 1904 | 1919 | |
| 29 | Jake Daubert | 165 | 1910 | 1924 | |
| 30 | Elmer Flick* | 164 | 1898 | 1910 | |
| | George Sisler* | 164 | 1915 | 1930 | |
| | Pie Traynor* | 164 | 1920 | 1937 | |
| 33 | Bill Dahlen | 163 | 1891 | 1911 | |
| | George Davis* | 163 | 1890 | 1909 | |
| | Lou Gehrig* | 163 | 1923 | 1939 | |
| | Nap Lajoie* | 163 | 1896 | 1916 | |
| 37 | Mike Tiernan | 162 | 1887 | 1899 | |
| 38 | George Van Haltren | 161 | 1887 | 1903 | |
| 39 | Harry Hooper* | 160 | 1909 | 1925 | |
| | Heinie Manush* | 160 | 1923 | 1939 | |
| | Sam Thompson* | 160 | 1885 | 1906 | |
| 42 | Max Carey* | 159 | 1910 | 1929 | |
| | Joe Judge | 159 | 1915 | 1934 | |
| 44 | Ed McKean | 158 | 1887 | 1899 | |
| 45 | Kiki Cuyler* | 157 | 1921 | 1938 | |
| | Jimmy Ryan | 157 | 1885 | 1903 | |
| 47 | Tommy Corcoran | 155 | 1890 | 1907 | |
| 48 | Earle Combs* | 154 | 1924 | 1935 | |
| 49 | Jim Bottomley* | 151 | 1922 | 1937 | |
| | Harry Heilmann* | 151 | 1914 | 1932 | |
| | Jim O'Rourke* | 151 | 1872 | 1904 | |
| 52 | Kip Selbach | 149 | 1894 | 1906 | |
| | Al Simmons* | 149 | 1924 | 1944 | |
| 54 | Wally Pipp | 148 | 1913 | 1928 | |
| | Enos Slaughter* | 148 | 1938 | 1959 | |
| 56 | Bobby Veach | 147 | 1912 | 1925 | |
| | Willie Wilson | 147 | 1976 | 1994 | |
| 58 | Charlie Gehringer* | 146 | 1924 | 1942 | |
| 59 | Harry Davis | 145 | 1895 | 1917 | |
| | Willie Keeler* | 145 | 1892 | 1910 | |
| 61 | Bobby Wallace* | 143 | 1894 | 1918 | |
| 62 | Cap Anson* | 142 | 1871 | 1897 | |
| 63 | Lou Brock* | 141 | 1961 | 1979 | |
| 64 | Willie Mays* | 140 | 1951 | 1973 | |
| 65 | John Reilly | 139 | 1880 | 1891 | |
| | Jimmy Williams | 139 (Note: Some older sources give Williams's career total as 138. According to SABR, "After Jimmy was collared in the season opener ..., Bill 'Wee Willie' Dammann gave up the overlooked hit when Cincy outfielder Elmer Smith, a Pittsburgh native and a former Pirate for several years, 'made a very bad mess of handling Jimmy's fly to left.' No hometown news outlet charged Elmer with an error for his misjudged 'awkward path' yet some box scores neglected to give Williams a triple, but 'the ball fell safe, Williams taking three bases.'") | 1899 | 1909 | |
| 67 | Tom Brown | 138 | 1882 | 1898 | |
| | Willie Davis | 138 | 1960 | 1979 | |
| | Frankie Frisch* | 138 | 1919 | 1937 | |
| 70 | George Brett* | 137 | 1973 | 1993 | |
| 71 | Babe Ruth* | 136 | 1914 | 1935 | |
| | Jimmy Sheckard | 136 | 1897 | 1913 | |
| | Elmer Smith | 136 | 1886 | 1901 | |
| 74 | Lave Cross | 135 | 1887 | 1907 | |
| | Pete Rose | 135 | 1963 | 1986 | |
| 76 | Shano Collins | 133 | 1910 | 1925 | |
| 77 | George Wood | 132 | 1880 | 1892 | |
| 78 | Brett Butler | 131 | 1981 | 1997 | |
| | Joe DiMaggio* | 131 | 1936 | 1951 | |
| | Buck Freeman | 131 | 1891 | 1907 | |
| | José Reyes | 131 | 2003 | 2018 | |
| 82 | Buddy Myer | 130 | 1925 | 1941 | |
| 83 | Oyster Burns | 129 | 1884 | 1895 | |
| | Larry Gardner | 129 | 1908 | 1924 | |
| 85 | Earl Averill* | 128 | 1929 | 1941 | |
| | Arky Vaughan* | 128 | 1932 | 1948 | |
| 87 | Vada Pinson | 127 | 1958 | 1975 | |
| 88 | Hardy Richardson | 126 | 1879 | 1892 | |
| | Robin Yount* | 126 | 1974 | 1993 | |
| 90 | Jimmie Foxx* | 125 | 1925 | 1945 | |
| 91 | John Anderson | 124 | 1894 | 1908 | |
| | Hal Chase | 124 | 1905 | 1919 | |
| | Steve Finley | 124 | 1989 | 2007 | |
| | Frank Schulte | 124 | 1904 | 1918 | |
| 95 | Carl Crawford | 123 | 2002 | 2016 | |
| | Larry Doyle | 123 | 1907 | 1920 | |
| | Duke Farrell | 123 | 1888 | 1905 | |
| 98 | Dummy Hoy | 121 | 1888 | 1902 | |
| 99 | Mickey Vernon | 120 | 1939 | 1960 | |
| 100 | Hugh Duffy* | 119 | 1888 | 1906 | |
| | Fred Pfeffer | 119 | 1882 | 1897 | |
| 102 | Joe Cronin* | 118 | 1926 | 1945 | |
| | Chick Stahl | 118 | 1897 | 1906 | |
| | Lloyd Waner* | 118 | 1927 | 1945 | |
| 105 | Lance Johnson | 117 | 1987 | 2000 | |
| | Del Pratt | 117 | 1912 | 1924 | |
| | Curt Walker | 117 | 1919 | 1930 | |
| 108 | Jimmy Collins* | 116 | 1895 | 1908 | |
| | Kenny Lofton | 116 | 1991 | 2007 | |
| 110 | Bill Kuehne | 115 | 1883 | 1892 | |
| | Tony Lazzeri* | 115 | 1926 | 1939 | |
| | Jimmy Rollins | 115 | 2000 | 2016 | |
| 113 | Henry Larkin | 114 | 1884 | 1893 | |
| | Paul Molitor* | 114 | 1978 | 1998 | |
| | Gus Suhr | 114 | 1930 | 1940 | |
| | Joe Tinker* | 114 | 1902 | 1916 | |
| | John Wilson | 114 | 1908 | 1916 | |
| 118 | Jack Fournier | 113 | 1912 | 1927 | |
| | Joe Medwick* | 113 | 1932 | 1948 | |
| | Tim Raines* | 113 | 1979 | 2002 | |
| 121 | Rod Carew* | 112 | 1967 | 1985 | |
| | Nellie Fox* | 112 | 1947 | 1965 | |
| | Bill Terry* | 112 | 1923 | 1936 | |
| | Sam Wise | 112 | 1881 | 1893 | |
| 125 | Joe Kuhel | 111 | 1930 | 1947 | |
| 126 | Babe Herman | 110 | 1926 | 1945 | |
| | Wally Moses | 110 | 1935 | 1951 | |
| 128 | Richie Ashburn* | 109 | 1948 | 1962 | |
| | Lu Blue | 109 | 1921 | 1933 | |
| | Doc Cramer | 109 | 1929 | 1948 | |
| | Johnny Damon | 109 | 1995 | 2012 | |
| | Jimmy Wolf | 109 | 1882 | 1892 | |
| 133 | George Burns | 108 | 1911 | 1925 | |
| | Mike Griffin | 108 | 1887 | 1898 | |
| | Charlie Grimm | 108 | 1916 | 1936 | |
| | Sam Mertes | 108 | 1896 | 1906 | |
| | Dots Miller | 108 | 1909 | 1921 | |
| | Dave Orr | 108 | 1883 | 1890 | |
| 139 | Ben Chapman | 107 | 1930 | 1946 | |
| | Carl Reynolds | 107 | 1927 | 1939 | |
| 141 | Bill Joyce | 106 | 1890 | 1898 | |
| | Les Mann | 106 | 1913 | 1928 | |
| | Garry Templeton | 106 | 1976 | 1991 | |
| 144 | Clyde Milan | 105 | 1907 | 1922 | |
| | John Stone | 105 | 1928 | 1938 | |
| 143 | Heinie Zimmerman | 105 | 1907 | 1919 | |
| 147 | Mike Mitchell | 104 | 1907 | 1914 | |
| 148 | Home Run Baker* | 103 | 1908 | 1922 | |
| | Tom Daly | 103 | 1887 | 1903 | |
| 150 | Luke Appling* | 102 | 1930 | 1950 | |
| | Bill Bruton | 102 | 1953 | 1964 | |
| | Duff Cooley | 102 | 1893 | 1905 | |
| | Jeff Heath | 102 | 1936 | 1949 | |
| | Charley Jones | 102 | 1875 | 1888 | |
| | King Kelly* | 102 | 1878 | 1893 | |
| | Danny Murphy | 102 | 1876 | 1900 | |
| | Juan Samuel | 102 | 1983 | 1998 | |
| 158 | Stuffy McInnis | 101 | 1909 | 1927 | |
| | Sam West | 101 | 1927 | 1942 | |
| 160 | Cupid Childs | 100 | 1888 | 1901 | |
| | Dan McGann | 100 | 1886 | 1908 | |
| | Hy Myers | 100 | 1909 | 1925 | |

== See also ==
- Yutaka Fukumoto – the player with the most career triples in Nippon Professional Baseball
