= List of Major League Baseball career runs scored leaders =

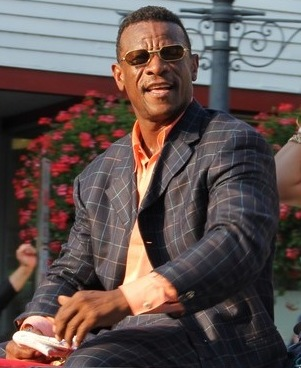
Rickey Henderson leads all Major League Baseball players with 2,295 career runs scored.

Listed are all Major League Baseball (MLB) players with 1,000 or more career runs scored. Players in boldface are active as of the 2026 Major League Baseball season.

== Key ==
**Rank**	Rank by career runs scored. A blank field indicates a tie.
**Player (number)**	Player's name and runs scored during the 2026 Major League Baseball season.
**R**	Total career runs scored.
*	Elected to National Baseball Hall of Fame.
**Bold**	Active player. (Note: A player is considered inactive if he has announced his retirement or has not played for a full season.)

== List ==
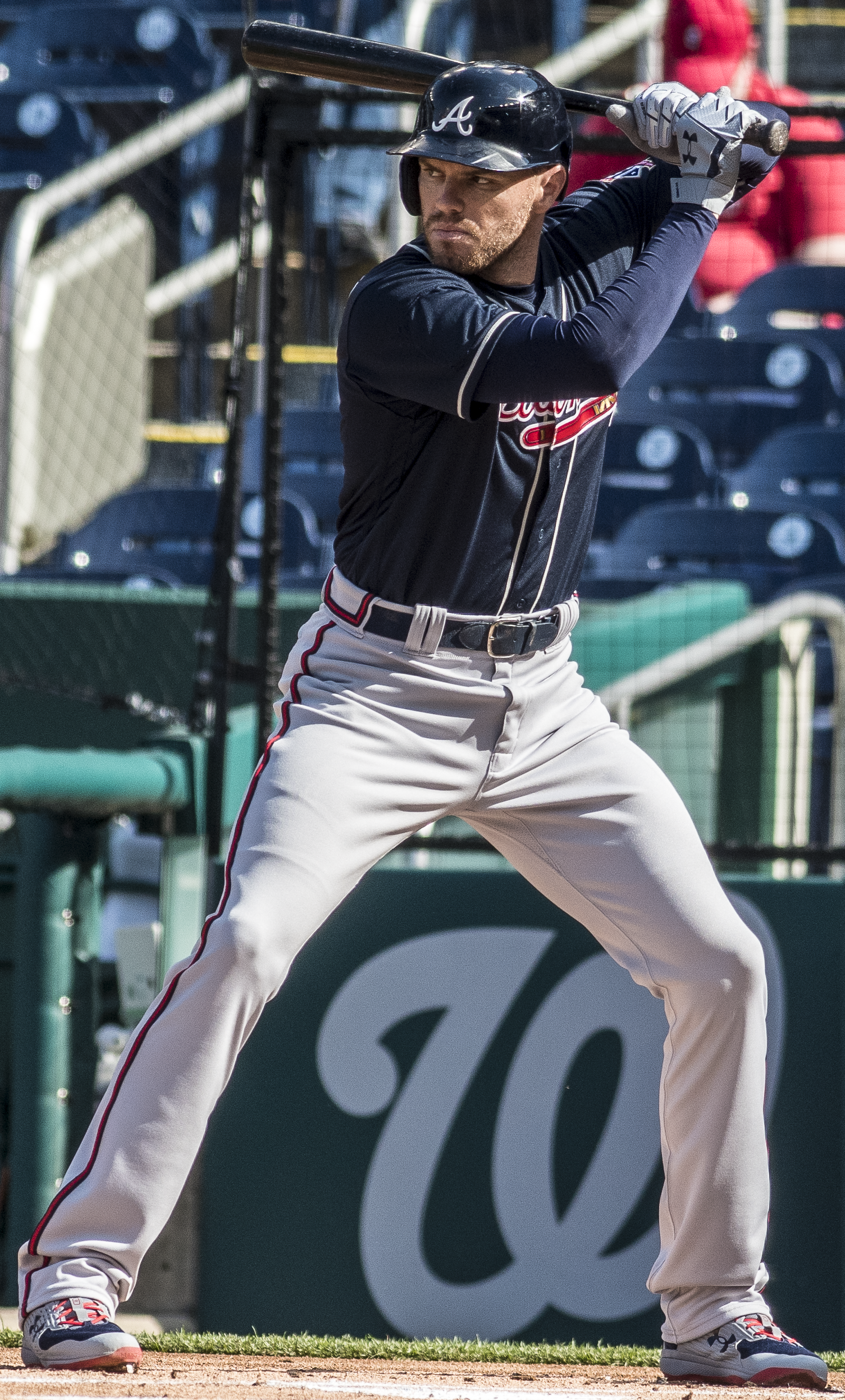
Freddie Freeman is the active leader in runs scored and tied for 81st all-time.

- Stats updated as of September 27, 2026.

Rank	Player (2026 Rs)	R
1	Rickey Henderson*	2,295
2	Ty Cobb*	2,245
3	Barry Bonds	2,227
4	Hank Aaron*	2,174
	Babe Ruth*	2,174
6	Pete Rose	2,165
7	Willie Mays*	2,068
8	Alex Rodriguez	2,021
9	Cap Anson* (Note: Cap Anson's run amounts are different depending on the source and what hits are included in various leagues he played in. His total varies from 1,719 to 1,999. MLB.com credits him with 1,719. Baseball-Reference.com credits him with 1,999.)	1,999
10	Stan Musial*	1,949
11	Derek Jeter*	1,923
12	Albert Pujols	1,914
13	Lou Gehrig*	1,888
14	Tris Speaker*	1,881
15	Mel Ott*	1,859
16	Craig Biggio*	1,844
17	Frank Robinson*	1,829
18	Eddie Collins*	1,821
19	Carl Yastrzemski*	1,816
20	Ted Williams*	1,798
21	Paul Molitor*	1,782
22	Charlie Gehringer*	1,775
23	Jimmie Foxx*	1,751
24	Honus Wagner*	1,739
25	Jesse Burkett*	1,720
26	Willie Keeler*	1,719
27	Billy Hamilton*	1,691
28	Bid McPhee*	1,678
29	Mickey Mantle*	1,677
30	Dave Winfield*	1,669
31	Johnny Damon	1,668
32	Rafael Palmeiro	1,663
33	Ken Griffey Jr.*	1,662
34	Joe Morgan*	1,650
35	Cal Ripken Jr.*	1,647
36	Jimmy Ryan	1,643
37	George Van Haltren	1,642
38	Gary Sheffield	1,636
39	Robin Yount*	1,632
40	Eddie Murray*	1,627
	Paul Waner*	1,627
42	Al Kaline*	1,622
43	Roger Connor*	1,620
44	Fred Clarke*	1,619
	Chipper Jones*	1,619
46	Lou Brock*	1,610
47	Jake Beckley*	1,600
48	Ed Delahanty*	1,599
49	Bill Dahlen	1,589
50	George Brett*	1,583
	Jim Thome*	1,583
52	Carlos Beltrán*	1,582
53	Rogers Hornsby*	1,579
54	Tim Raines*	1,571
55	Hugh Duffy*	1,554
56	Miguel Cabrera	1,551
	Reggie Jackson*	1,551
58	Max Carey*	1,545
59	Manny Ramirez	1,544
60	George Davis*	1,539
61	Frankie Frisch*	1,532
62	Kenny Lofton	1,528
63	Adrián Beltré*	1,524
64	Dan Brouthers*	1,523
65	Tom Brown	1,521
66	Jeff Bagwell*	1,517
67	Wade Boggs*	1,513
	Sam Rice*	1,513
69	Eddie Mathews*	1,509
70	Roberto Alomar*	1,508
71	Al Simmons*	1,507
72	Mike Schmidt*	1,506
73	Nap Lajoie*	1,504
74	Frank Thomas*	1,494
75	Harry Stovey	1,492
76	Goose Goslin*	1,482
77	Arlie Latham	1,478
78	Sammy Sosa	1,475
79	Dwight Evans	1,470
80	Herman Long	1,456
81	Bobby Abreu	1,453
	**Freddie Freeman (74)**	1,453
83	Jim O'Rourke*	1,446
84	Omar Vizquel	1,445
85	Steve Finley	1,443

Rank	Player (2026 Rs)	R
86	Harry Hooper*	1,428
87	Dummy Hoy	1,426
88	Rod Carew*	1,424
89	Joe Kelley*	1,421
	Jimmy Rollins	1,421
91	Ichiro Suzuki*	1,420
92	David Ortiz*	1,419
93	Roberto Clemente*	1,416
94	Luis González	1,412
95	Billy Williams*	1,410
96	John Montgomery Ward*	1,408
97	Mike Griffin	1,405
98	Todd Helton*	1,401
99	Sam Crawford*	1,391
100	Joe DiMaggio*	1,390
101	Lou Whitaker	1,386
102	Tony Gwynn*	1,383
103	Andre Dawson*	1,373
104	Vada Pinson	1,366
	Bernie Williams	1,366
106	Brett Butler	1,359
107	Doc Cramer	1,357
	King Kelly*	1,357
109	Tommy Leach	1,355
	Larry Walker*	1,355
111	Iván Rodríguez*	1,354
112	Fred McGriff*	1,349
113	Darrell Evans	1,344
114	Pee Wee Reese*	1,338
115	Luis Aparicio*	1,335
116	Lave Cross	1,333
117	Barry Larkin*	1,329
118	Vladimir Guerrero*	1,328
119	George Gore	1,327
120	**Paul Goldschmidt (44)**	1,324
121	Richie Ashburn*	1,322
122	Jeff Kent*	1,320
123	Luke Appling*	1,319
124	Patsy Donovan	1,318
	Ryne Sandberg*	1,318
126	Mike Tiernan	1,313
127	**Jose Altuve (70)**	1,306
128	Ernie Banks*	1,305
	Kiki Cuyler*	1,305
130	Tony Phillips	1,300
131	Harold Baines*	1,299
132	**Andrew McCutchen (8)**	1,298
133	Torii Hunter	1,296
	Jimmy Sheckard	1,296
135	Harry Heilmann*	1,291
136	Zack Wheat*	1,289
137	Heinie Manush*	1,288
138	Julio Franco	1,285
139	George Sisler*	1,284
140	Harmon Killebrew*	1,283
141	Donie Bush	1,282
	**Mike Trout (86)**	1,282
143	Nellie Fox*	1,279
144	Fred Tenney	1,278
145	Carlton Fisk*	1,276
146	Dave Parker*	1,272
	Tony Pérez*	1,272
148	Robinson Canó	1,262
149	Sam Thompson*	1,261
150	Duke Snider*	1,259
151	Bobby Bonds	1,258
152	Ozzie Smith*	1,257
153	Rabbit Maranville*	1,256
154	Jim Gilliam	1,255
155	Ellis Burks	1,253
156	Jim Edmonds	1,251
157	Ray Durham	1,249
	Jim Rice*	1,249
159	**Bryce Harper (93)**	1,247
	Enos Slaughter*	1,247
161	Ian Kinsler	1,243
162	Carlos Delgado	1,241
163	Chili Davis	1,240
164	Stan Hack	1,239
	Bob Johnson	1,239
	Willie Randolph	1,239
167	**Mookie Betts (71)**	1,237
168	Don Baylor	1,236
	Joe Kuhel	1,236
170	Joe Cronin*	1,233

Rank	Player (2026 Rs)	R
	Brooks Robinson*	1,232
172	Alan Trammell*	1,231
173	Miguel Tejada	1,230
174	Willie McCovey*	1,229
175	Minnie Miñoso*	1,228
176	Jason Giambi	1,227
	Ed McKean	1,227
178	Earl Averill*	1,224
179	Red Schoendienst*	1,223
180	Edgar Martínez*	1,219
181	Willie Davis	1,217
	Curtis Granderson	1,217
	Paul Hines	1,217
184	Eddie Yost	1,215
185	Cupid Childs	1,214
186	Scott Rolen*	1,211
187	Andruw Jones*	1,204
188	Lloyd Waner*	1,201
189	Édgar Rentería	1,200
190	Joe Medwick*	1,198
191	Dale Murphy	1,197
192	Mickey Vernon	1,196
193	Andrés Galarraga	1,195
194	Willie Stargell*	1,194
195	Graig Nettles	1,193
196	Tommy Corcoran	1,189
	Al Oliver	1,189
	Rusty Staub	1,189
199	George Burns	1,188
	Brian Downing	1,188
201	Marquis Grissom	1,187
202	José Canseco	1,186
	Will Clark	1,186
	Earle Combs*	1,186
205	Joe Judge	1,184
206	Pie Traynor*	1,183
207	Bert Campaneris	1,181
208	Fielder Jones	1,180
	José Reyes	1,180
210	Mark Grace	1,179
211	Jim Bottomley*	1,177
212	Yogi Berra*	1,175
	Arky Vaughan*	1,175
214	Buddy Myer	1,174
215	Joey Votto	1,171
216	Joe Carter	1,170
217	Willie Wilson	1,169
218	Chuck Klein*	1,168
219	Mark McGwire	1,167
220	Jack Glasscock	1,164
	**Manny Machado (82)**	1,164
222	Billy Herman*	1,163
223	Paul Konerko	1,162
224	Matt Holliday	1,157
225	Cool Papa Bell*	1,152
	Lu Blue	1,152
	Alfonso Soriano	1,152
228	Buddy Bell	1,151
229	Lance Berkman	1,146
230	Ben Chapman	1,144
231	Steve Garvey	1,143
232	Joe Sewell*	1,141
233	Deacon White*	1,140
234	John Olerud	1,139
235	Ron Santo*	1,138
236	Michael Young	1,137
237	Bobby Lowe	1,135
238	Chuck Knoblauch	1,132
239	Orlando Cepeda*	1,131
240	Dick Bartell	1,130
	Gary Gaetti	1,130
242	Buck Ewing*	1,129
	Shawn Green	1,129
	Ken Griffey, Sr.	1,129
245	Hardy Richardson	1,127
246	Carlos Lee	1,125
	Devon White	1,125
248	Keith Hernandez	1,124
	Wally Moses	1,124
250	Jay Bell	1,123
	Reggie Smith	1,123
252	Brian Giles	1,121
253	Bill Terry*	1,120
254	Nick Markakis	1,119
255	Jack Clark	1,118

Rank	Player (2026 Rs)	R
	Johnny Mize*	1,118
257	Jake Daubert	1,116
258	Toby Harrah	1,115
259	Sherry Magee	1,112
260	Moisés Alou	1,109
261	Jimmy Dykes	1,108
	**Carlos Santana (1)**	1,108
263	Gil Hodges*	1,105
	Jimmy Wynn	1,105
265	Ken Boyer	1,104
266	Chase Utley	1,103
267	**Christian Yelich (69)**	1,102
268	Dick Allen*	1,099
	Edwin Encarnacion	1,099
	Edd Roush*	1,099
	Mark Teixeira	1,099
272	Aramis Ramírez	1,098
273	Adam Dunn	1,097
274	Fred Pfeffer	1,096
275	Bobby Doerr*	1,094
276	Amos Otis	1,092
277	Johnny Bench*	1,091
278	Nelson Cruz	1,090
279	Garret Anderson	1,084
	Bobby Bonilla	1,084
	César Cedeño	1,084
	Rubén Sierra	1,084
	Tommy Tucker	1,084
284	Gary Matthews	1,083
285	Derrek Lee	1,081
286	Ryan Braun	1,080
	Larry Doby*	1,080
	Ron Gant	1,080
	Billy Nash	1,080
290	Bill Buckner	1,077
291	Magglio Ordóñez	1,076
292	Juan Pierre	1,075
293	**Francisco Lindor (63)**	1,074
	Ted Simmons*	1,074
295	**Nolan Arenado (80)**	1,072
	**José Ramírez (71)**	1,072
297	Kirby Puckett*	1,071
298	Harlond Clift	1,070
299	Maury Wills	1,067
300	Tommy McCarthy*	1,066
	Kip Selbach	1,066
302	Mike Cameron	1,064
	Alvin Dark	1,064
	Bob Elliott	1,064
305	Rafael Furcal	1,063
	Fred Lynn	1,063
307	Brady Anderson	1,062
	Charlie Jamieson	1,062
	B. J. Surhoff	1,062
310	Juan González	1,061
311	Elvis Andrus	1,058
	Justin Upton	1,058
313	Tony Fernández	1,057
	Bobby Wallace*	1,057
315	Jimmy Collins*	1,055
	Raúl Ibañez	1,055
317	Hanley Ramírez	1,049
318	Dave Bancroft*	1,048
	Mike Piazza*	1,048
320	Dom DiMaggio	1,046
	Hank Greenberg*	1,046
322	Norm Cash	1,045
323	Mickey Cochrane*	1,041
	Paul O'Neill	1,041
	**George Springer (59)**	1,041
326	Dixie Walker	1,038
327	Reggie Sanders	1,037
328	José Cruz	1,036
329	Bobby Grich	1,033
330	Jason Kendall	1,030
331	Gary Carter*	1,025
	Tom Daly	1,025
333	John McGraw*	1,024
	Cy Williams	1,024
335	Davey Lopes	1,023
	**Marcus Semien (55)**	1,023
337	José Bautista	1,022
	Kid Gleason	1,022
339	Joe Mauer*	1,018
340	Evan Longoria	1,017

Rank	Player (2026 Rs)	R
	Greg Vaughn	1,017
342	**Xander Bogaerts** **(68)**	1,016
343	Cecil Cooper	1,012
344	Roy Thomas	1,011
345	Willie McGee	1,010
346	Tino Martinez	1,009
	Plácido Polanco	1,009
348	Marty McManus	1,008
349	Carney Lansford	1,007
	Don Mattingly	1,007
351	Frankie Crosetti	1,006
	Roger Peckinpaugh	1,006
	Robin Ventura	1,006
354	Brandon Phillips	1,005
	Tony Taylor	1,005
356	Augie Galan	1,004
	Clyde Milan	1,004
358	Luis Castillo	1,001
	Harry Davis	1,001
	Vern Stephens	1,001

Through September 27, 2026, these active players have at least 850 runs scored:

- Trea Turner (971) 101 in 2026
- Giancarlo Stanton (951) 8 in 2026
- Aaron Judge (918) 45 in 2026
- Kyle Schwarber (895) 95 in 2026
- Starling Marte (892) 15 in 2026
- Eugenio Suárez (881) 50 in 2026
- Alex Bregman (850) 92 in 2026
