= Heinie Reitz =

American baseball player (1867–1914)

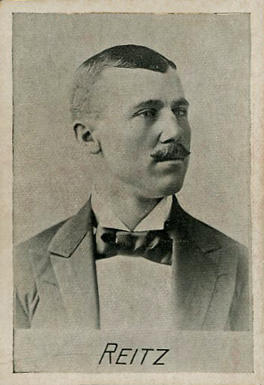
- Second baseman
- Born: June 29, 1867; Chicago, Illinois, U.S.
- Died: November 10, 1914 (aged 47); Sacramento, California, U.S.
- Batted: Left Threw: Right

MLB debut
- April 27, 1893, for the Baltimore Orioles

Last MLB appearance
- June 3, 1899, for the Pittsburgh Pirates

MLB statistics
- Batting average: .292
- Home runs: 11
- Runs batted in: 463
- Stats at Baseball Reference

Teams
- Baltimore Orioles (1893–1897); Washington Senators (1898); Pittsburgh Pirates (1899)

Henry Peter Reitz (June 29, 1867 – November 10, 1914), nicknamed "Heinie", was an American second baseman in Major League Baseball who played for the Baltimore Orioles, Washington Senators, and Pittsburgh Pirates. He was born in Chicago.

== Career ==
In 1893, Reitz was sold, for $300, by the San Francisco Friscos to the Baltimore Orioles. His five-year tenure at Baltimore included his most notable season, 1894, during which he collected 31 triples. At the time, this tied Dave Orr's mark, set in 1886, for most triples in a single season. Although Chief Wilson surpassed both of them with his 36 triple season in 1912, Reitz and Orr still hold second place for this record. Contributing to Reitz's 31 triples in 1894 were two bases loaded triples he hit in the 3rd and 7th inning on June 4 against the Chicago Colts that led Baltimore to a 12–4 victory. Reitz's two bases loaded triples in a single game matched a feat achieved by Sam Thompson in 1887. The frequency with which Reitz hit triples in 1894 was marked departure from every other season in his career. Excluding his record-tying season, he averaged under six triples per year.

On December 10, 1897, he was traded (with Jack Doyle and Doc Amole) to the Washington Senators in exchange for Doc McJames, Gene DeMontreville, and Dan McGann. After one season in Washington, Reitz was traded to the Pittsburgh Pirates in exchange for Dick Padden, Jimmy Slagle, and Jack O'Brien. Reitz played 34 games for Pittsburgh in the 1899 season, and was traded in March 1900, to Milwaukee of the American Association in exchange for a player to be named later. In September 1900, Pittsburgh received Harry Smith to complete the transaction.

Reitz was killed in a car accident at the age of 47 in Sacramento, California. This marked the first time that a car accident claimed the life of a major league baseball player, although it would not be until 1924 that an active major-leaguer, Boston Braves shortstop Tony Boeckel, would die in an auto accident.

== See also ==
- List of Major League Baseball annual triples leaders
