= Ed McKean =

American baseball player (1864–1919)

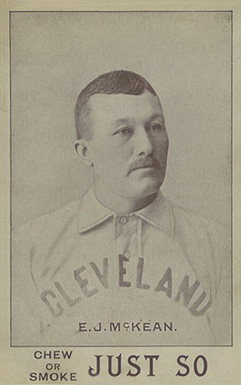
- 1893 baseball card of McKean
- Shortstop
- Born: June 6, 1864; Grafton, Ohio, U.S.
- Died: August 16, 1919 (aged 55); Cleveland, Ohio, U.S.
- Batted: Right Threw: Right

MLB debut
- April 16, 1887, for the Cleveland Blues

Last MLB appearance
- July 27, 1899, for the St. Louis Perfectos

MLB statistics
- Batting average: .302
- Hits: 2,084
- Home runs: 67
- Runs batted in: 1,124
- Stats at Baseball Reference

Teams
- Cleveland Blues/Spiders (1887–1898); St. Louis Perfectos (1899)

Edwin John McKean (June 6, 1864 – August 16, 1919) was an American professional baseball shortstop. He played 13 seasons in Major League Baseball (MLB), primarily for the National League's Cleveland Spiders. He was the eighth player to reach 2,000 career hits, doing so in 1898.

== Career ==
Born in Grafton, Ohio, McKean began his professional baseball career in 1884 with the Youngstown, Ohio club in the minor league Iron & Oil Association. After two more seasons in the minors, he was signed by the Cleveland Blues of the American Association, and became the club's starting shortstop in their first year as a major league team. He remained in that position for the franchise (which was renamed the Spiders in 1889) for nearly its entire existence.

With Cleveland, McKean had over 120 games played and 540 plate appearances every year from 1887 to 1898. He was second in the National League in hits in 1891, with 170. In 1893, he was second in the National League in runs batted in, with 133.

Prior to the 1899 season, the Spiders transferred most of their best players to the St. Louis Perfectos, including McKean. This was legal at the time, and both teams were owned by the same group led by the Robison brothers. On May 12, 1899, McKean hit a walk-off home run against the Spiders while technically being the visiting team. This feat was not accomplished again until Amed Rosario did it for the New York Mets against the New York Yankees in 2020. However, McKean did not perform up to expectations and was let go in July. The following season, the Spiders folded, and such shenanigans were outlawed.

During his MLB career, McKean had a total of 67 home runs, 2,084 hits, and 1,124 runs batted in and owned a lifetime batting average of .302. He recorded three seasons with over 110 runs scored and four seasons with over 110 runs batted in. Among peers in the late 19th century as shortstop (1871-1900), he had the most hits at the position.

After not playing professionally for two years, McKean returned to play in the minor leagues in 1902 as player-manager of the Rochester Bronchos. He spent several more years in the minors and retired following the 1908 season with the Bay City Reds.

McKean died at age 55 in Cleveland, Ohio.

== See also ==
- List of Major League Baseball career hits leaders
- List of Major League Baseball career triples leaders
- List of Major League Baseball career runs scored leaders
- List of Major League Baseball career runs batted in leaders
