= Sam Crawford =

American baseball player and coach (1880–1968)

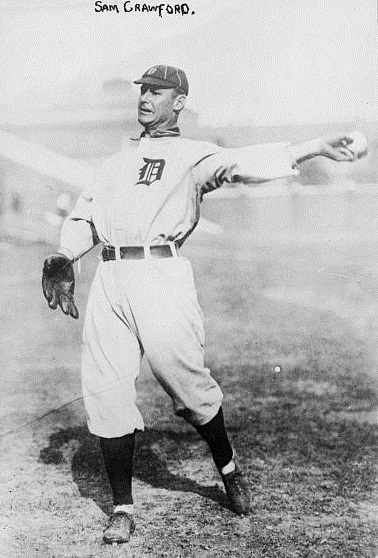
- Crawford in 1909
- Outfielder
- Born: April 18, 1880; Wahoo, Nebraska, U.S.
- Died: June 15, 1968 (aged 88); Hollywood, California, U.S.
- Batted: Left Threw: Left

MLB debut
- September 10, 1899, for the Cincinnati Reds

Last MLB appearance
- September 16, 1917, for the Detroit Tigers

MLB statistics
- Batting average: .309
- Hits: 2,961
- Home runs: 97
- Runs batted in: 1,525
- Triples: 309
- Stats at Baseball Reference

Teams
- Cincinnati Reds (1899–1902); Detroit Tigers (1903–1917)

Career highlights and awards
- 2× Home run leader (1901, 1908); 3× AL RBI leader (1910, 1914, 1915); MLB record 309 career triples; Name honored by the Tigers; Cincinnati Reds Hall of Fame

Member of the National

Baseball Hall of Fame
- Induction: 1957
- Election method: Veterans Committee

Samuel Earl Crawford (April 18, 1880 – June 15, 1968), nicknamed "Wahoo Sam", was an American outfielder in Major League Baseball (MLB). Crawford batted and threw left-handed, stood 6 ft 0 in (1.83 m) tall and weighed 190 pounds (86 kg). Born in Wahoo, Nebraska, he had a short minor league baseball career before rapidly rising to the majors with the Cincinnati Reds in 1899. He played for the Reds until 1902.

Taking advantage of the competition for players between the National League and the then-ascendant American League, Crawford then joined the Detroit Tigers and played for Detroit, primarily in right field, from 1903 to 1917.

He was one of the greatest sluggers of his era, leading his league in home runs twice and in runs batted in three times. He still holds the MLB record for most career triples with 309, a record likely never to be broken.

While with the Tigers, Crawford played alongside superstar Ty Cobb, and the two had an intense rivalry while also helping Detroit win three American League championships from 1907 to 1909.

After his MLB career ended, Crawford moved to California, where he lived the rest of his life. He was a player and umpire in the Pacific Coast League and was a coach at the University of Southern California. He was elected to the Baseball Hall of Fame in 1957.

== Early life ==
Crawford was born in Wahoo, Nebraska, in 1880, the son of Stephen O. Crawford (born 1842 in Vermont) and Nellie Crawford (born 1855 in Iowa). In 1901, he married Ada M. Lattin, born circa 1881 in Nebraska. He was listed as a ballplayer in 1910, and had one daughter, Virginia, born circa 1905 in Michigan. Various ship records confirm his birthdate and that of wife Ada. As of the 1920 U.S. census the family was living in Los Angeles, with other records establishing Samuel having arrived March 15, 1918.

According to a biography from the Nebraska Hall of Fame, Crawford was a star athlete at Wahoo High School, leading the team to two state football championships in 1896 and 1897 and was also noted for "foot racing" wherever he played. In 1898, he joined a traveling baseball team in Wahoo. They traveled on a lumber wagon from town to town for weeks at a time, challenging the locals to baseball games, and passing the hat to pay their expenses. Crawford was offered an opportunity in the spring of 1899 to play for the Chatham Reds of the Canadian League for $65 per month, plus board. Crawford seized the opportunity and left behind his job as a barber's apprentice. From Chatham, Crawford moved on to play for the Grand Rapids Prodigals in the Western League.

== Major League Baseball career ==
=== Cincinnati Reds ===
In September 1899, Grand Rapids sold Crawford to the Cincinnati Reds. Crawford played in 31 games for the Reds at the end of the 1899 season. At age 19, and one year removed from his days playing for Wahoo's traveling team, Crawford was playing in the major leagues with future Hall of Famers Jake Beckley and Bid McPhee. Crawford hit .307 in 31 games with the Reds in 1899. In 1900, at age 20, he played in 101 games and was among the National League leaders in triples with 15 and home runs with seven.

Crawford was one of the best sluggers in baseball in 1901, batting .330 and hitting a major league leading 16 home runs. He was also third in the National League in triples (16), RBIs (104) and slugging percentage (.524). Crawford had another solid year in 1902, leading the National League in total bases (256) and triples (22), and placing second in batting average (.333), slugging percentage (.461) and extra base hits (43). He hit 12 inside-the-park home runs in 1901 – a major league record that has never been equaled.

=== Detroit Tigers ===
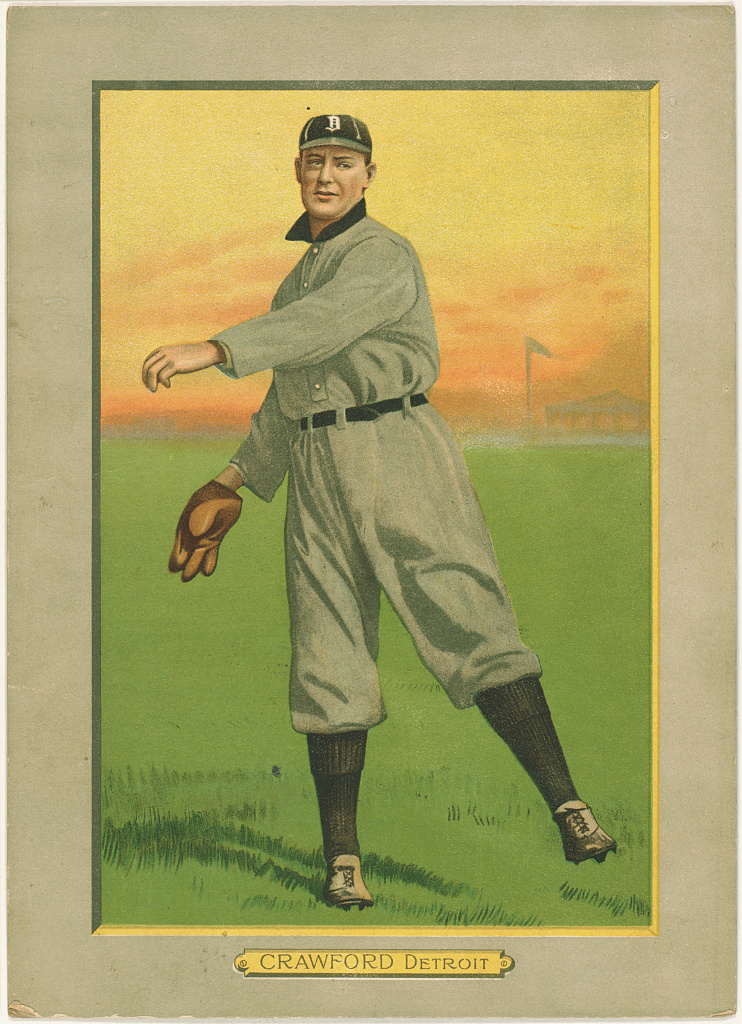
1911 baseball card of Crawford

At the end of 1902, a bidding war for players developed between the National League and American League. Crawford signed contracts with both the Reds and the Detroit Tigers. The competing contracts led to a publicized legal dispute, with a judge ultimately awarding Crawford to the Tigers but requiring $3,000 in compensation to the Reds.

Crawford joined the Tigers for the 1903 season and remained there until the end of his major league career in 1917. In 1903, he led the American League with 25 triples, and finished second in the batting race with a .335 batting average.

With the addition of Ty Cobb at the end of the 1905 season, the Tigers had two of the best hitters in baseball. Cobb and Crawford led Detroit to three straight American League pennants in 1907, 1908 and 1909, but both of them slumped in their World Series appearances, as the Tigers lost all three. Crawford hit for a .243 average in three World Series, and Cobb hit an uncharacteristic .200 in the 1907 World Series and .231 in the 1909 World Series.

Although Crawford never got to play in another World Series, he remained one of the most feared hitters in baseball through 1915. In 1911, he hit a career-high .378 with 115 RBIs and 57 extra base hits. From 1913 to 1915, Crawford played in 472 consecutive games for the Tigers. Crawford was among the American League leaders in hits, RBIs, extra base hits, slugging percentage and total bases every year from 1905 to 1915. He led the American League in triples five times, including an American League record 26 triples in 1914. On August 23, 1913, Crawford hit his record-breaking 245th career triple in the first game of a doubleheader against the New York Yankees. He remains the all-time major league leader, retiring with 309 triples in his career.

Though his defense suffered in his later years, Crawford was a good fielder in his prime. In 1900, his range factor was 2.68 – 55 points higher than the league average of 2.13. In 1905, he led all American League outfielders with a .988 fielding percentage – 35 points higher than the league average.

Despite Crawford leading the league in both RBI (112) and extra base hits (54) in 1915, the Tigers began transitioning the right field responsibilities from Crawford to their young hitting star, future Baseball Hall of Famer Harry Heilmann in 1916. That year, Crawford played 78 games in right field, and Heilmann played 66, with Crawford's plate appearances cut almost in half from 694 to 368.

In 1917, Crawford lost his spot in the lineup altogether and was relegated principally to a pinch-hitting role. In his new limited role, Crawford hit .173 in 104 at bats. At the end of the 1917 season, Crawford was released and did not play in Major League Baseball again.

=== Career accomplishments ===
Crawford was one of the greatest sluggers of the dead-ball era. He still holds the major league records for triples in a career (309) and inside-the-park home runs in a season (12). He has the second most inside-the-park home runs in a career (51), and the remarkable distinction of hitting more triples than doubles four times in his career: 22 to 18 in 1902, 25 to 23 in 1903, 26 to 22 in 1914, and 13 to 11 in 1916, the last at the ripe old age for a ballplayer of his era of 36.

Crawford became the first player to lead both the National League and American League in home runs (1901 and 1908). He was among the AL leaders in hits, RBI, extra base hits, slugging percentage and total bases for 11 consecutive years, from 1905 to 1915. Using Baseball-Reference.com's "Gray Ink Test", which awards points based on how often a player is among the league batting leaders, Crawford ranks as the ninth in baseball history. He finished his career with 2,961 hits and a .309 batting average. He ranks fifth on the Detroit Tigers all-time hits list with 2,466 hits as a Tiger.

Ed Barrow, who managed Crawford in his first two years with Detroit, and went on to convert Babe Ruth to an outfielder as general manager of the Yankees, once said that there never was a better hitter than Crawford. One of his contemporaries, Fielder Jones, said of Crawford: "None of them can hit quite as hard as Crawford. He stands up at the plate like a brick house and he hits all the pitchers, without playing favorites."

There has existed controversy as to the correct hit total of Crawford's career. Lawrence Ritter reminded that The National Baseball Commission - the pre-1920 authority of all Major League matters, ruled that the 1894-1899 Western League individual records of all players competing afterwards in either National or American Leagues would be credited with the individual statistics earned in the Western League as part and parcel of their major league records. Crawford had 87 hits as a member of the Grand Rapids (baseball) Prodigals 1899 Western League team. Therefore, amongst other amendments, his total should be 3,051 hits. Despite this early modern baseball ruling, no future authority sustains this particular opinion of the National Commission, and, of present, his tally is elsewise universally accepted to be 2,964 hits.

=== Rivalry with Ty Cobb ===
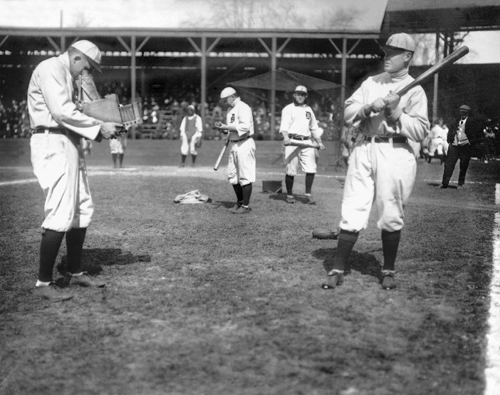
Cobb and Crawford with a camera, circa 1914

Sam Crawford and Ty Cobb were teammates for parts of 13 seasons. They played beside each other in right and center field, and Crawford followed Cobb in the batting order year after year. Despite this, the two had a complicated relationship.

When Cobb entered the major leagues with the Tigers in 1905, Crawford was one of the Detroit veterans who bullied Cobb. Cobb, a volatile personality, took it personally. However, Cobb soon became established as the best hitter in the game and became more accepted on the Tigers team as they won AL championships in 1907, 1908 and 1909. During this time, Cobb and Crawford had a student-teacher relationship. In interviews late in life with Al Stump, Cobb told of studying Crawford's base-stealing technique and of how Crawford would teach him about pursuing fly balls and throwing out base runners. Cobb said that he would always remember Crawford's kindness.

The student-teacher relationship gradually changed to one of jealous rivals. Cobb was unpopular with his teammates, and as he became the biggest star in baseball, Crawford was unhappy with the preferential treatment given Cobb. Cobb was allowed to report late for spring training and given private quarters on the road – privileges not offered to Crawford. The competition between the two was intense. Crawford recalled that, if he went three for four on a day when Cobb went hitless, Cobb would turn red and sometimes walk out of the park with the game still on. When it was initially (and erroneously) reported that Nap Lajoie had won the batting title in 1910, Crawford was alleged to have been one of several Tigers who sent a telegram to Lajoie congratulating him on beating Cobb.

In retirement, Cobb wrote a letter to a writer for The Sporting News accusing Crawford of not helping in the outfield and of intentionally fouling off balls when Cobb was stealing a base. Crawford learned about the letter in 1946 and accused Cobb of being a "cheapskate" who never helped his teammates. He said that Cobb had not been a very good fielder, "so he blamed me." Crawford denied intentionally trying to deprive Cobb of stolen bases, saying that Cobb had "dreamed that up."

When asked about the feud, Cobb attributed it to jealousy. He felt that Crawford was "a hell of a good player", but he was "second best" on the Tigers and "hated to be an also ran." Cobb biographer Richard Bak noted that the two "only barely tolerated each other" and agreed with Cobb that Crawford's attitude was driven by Cobb's having stolen Crawford's thunder.

Although they may not have spoken to each other, Cobb and Crawford developed an uncanny ability to communicate non-verbally with looks and nods on the base paths. They became one of the most successful double steal pairings in baseball history.

After Cobb died, a reporter found hundreds of letters in his home responding to letters Cobb had written to influential people, lobbying for Crawford's induction into the Baseball Hall of Fame. Crawford was reportedly unaware of Cobb's efforts until after Cobb died.

== Later baseball career ==
After being released by the Tigers, Crawford joined the minor league Los Angeles Angels of the Pacific Coast League, helping them to win league championships in 1918 and 1921. In his first game he got two hits, stole a base and threw out two runners. Crawford played four seasons for the Angels (1918–1921). In 1918 he played in 96 games, got 104 hits, and batted .292. In 1919 he hit .360 with 239 hits, 41 doubles, 18 triples, 14 home runs and 14 stolen bases in 173 games. (The PCL played an irregular schedule, with substantially more games than the then 154-game Major League season.) In 1920 he batted .332 and had 239 hits, 46 doubles and 21 triples in 187 games. His last year, at 41 years-old in 1921, he hit .316 with 199 hits and 44 doubles in 175 games.

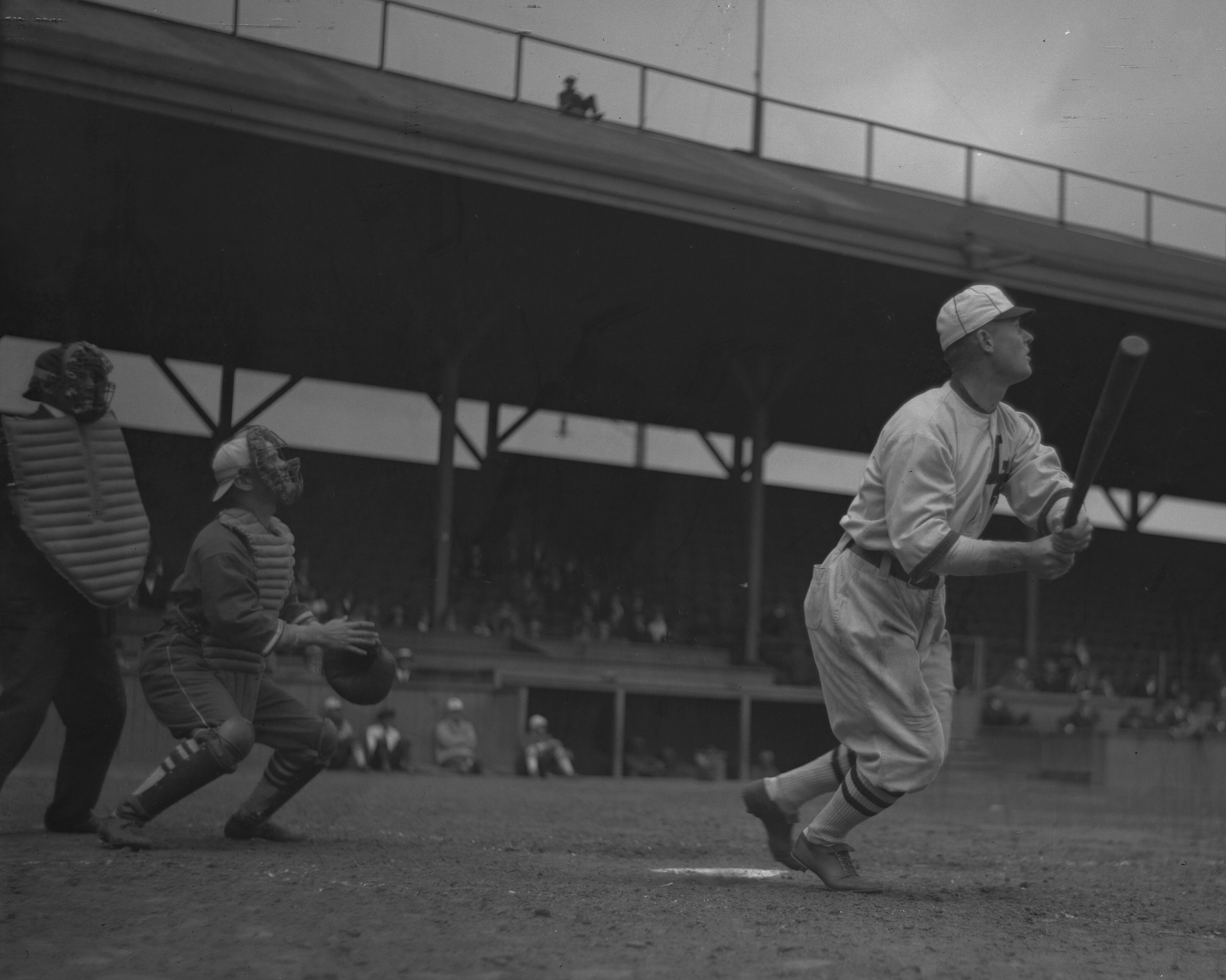
Crawford (right) hitting a ball in 1920

Crawford decided to stay in Southern California, and in 1924 became the head coach of the University of Southern California (USC) baseball team, a position he held until 1929. He was instrumental in the development of the California Intercollegiate Baseball Association in 1927, and led USC to second-place finishes in his last two seasons. Crawford was 59–46–3 as the USC coach. He later worked as an umpire in the Pacific Coast League from 1935 to 1938, quitting after finding it a thankless job and lonely life.

In 1927, Crawford had a role as the baseball coach in Buster Keaton's comedy film College.

== Later life ==
Sam Crawford was honored alongside the retired numbers of the Detroit Tigers in 2000.

In retirement, Crawford became somewhat reclusive, staying away from official baseball functions. He was elected to the Baseball Hall of Fame by the Veterans Committee in 1957. At the time, he was living in a small cabin on the edge of the Mojave Desert near Pearblossom, California. Reporters showed up there with the news, shocking the locals, who were unaware that their neighbor had even played Major League Baseball. After his election, Crawford told the curator in Cooperstown that he wanted his plaque to read "Wahoo Sam." He noted: "That's my hometown, and I'm proud of it."

Crawford spent much of his later years working in his garden and reading. In March 1964, in Baywood Park, California, he was interviewed by Lawrence Ritter for the 1966 book The Glory of Their Times, a series of interviews with the players of the early 20th century. Crawford's tales of teammates such as Cobb and deaf player Dummy Hoy, and opponents such as Honus Wagner, helped to make the book one of the most admired ever written about baseball. During the Ritter interviews, Crawford quoted from the works of philosopher George Santayana and agnostic Robert Ingersoll, and discussed the works of one of his favorite writers, Honoré de Balzac. As for how he hoped to be remembered, he said: "When I kick off they'll say, 'Well, good old Sam, he wasn't such a bad guy after all. Everything considered, he was pretty fair and square. We'll miss him.'"

Crawford suffered a stroke on May 26, 1968, and died two weeks later at Hollywood Community Hospital in Los Angeles at age 88. He was interred in the Inglewood Park Cemetery in Inglewood. In 1999, Crawford was ranked number 84 on The Sporting News' list of the 100 Greatest Baseball Players, and was nominated as a finalist for the Major League Baseball All-Century Team.

== See also ==
- List of Major League Baseball career hits leaders
- List of Major League Baseball career extra base hits leaders
- List of Major League Baseball career doubles leaders
- List of Major League Baseball career triples leaders
- List of Major League Baseball career total bases leaders
- List of Major League Baseball career runs scored leaders
- List of Major League Baseball career runs batted in leaders
- List of Major League Baseball career stolen bases leaders
- List of Major League Baseball annual doubles leaders
- List of Major League Baseball annual triples leaders
- List of Major League Baseball annual home run leaders
- List of Major League Baseball annual runs scored leaders
- List of Major League Baseball annual runs batted in leaders
- List of Major League Baseball triples records
- List of Major League Baseball home run records
