= Jimmy Williams (second baseman) =

American baseball player (1876–1965)

- Second baseman
- Born: December 20, 1876; St. Louis, Missouri, U.S.
- Died: January 16, 1965 (aged 88); St. Petersburg, Florida, U.S.
- Batted: Right Threw: Right

MLB debut
- April 15, 1899, for the Pittsburgh Pirates

Last MLB appearance
- October 3, 1909, for the St. Louis Browns

MLB statistics
- Batting average: .275
- Home runs: 49
- Runs batted in: 796
- Stats at Baseball Reference

Teams
- Pittsburgh Pirates (1899–1900); Baltimore Orioles (1901–1902); New York Highlanders (1903–1907); St. Louis Browns (1908–1909)

James Thomas Williams (December 20, 1876 – January 16, 1965) was a second baseman in Major League Baseball from 1899 to 1909. He played for the Pittsburgh Pirates, Baltimore Orioles, New York Highlanders, and St. Louis Browns. The power-hitting Williams set several records during his rookie season and led a major league in triples three times. He stood at 5' 9" and weighed 175 lbs.

== Career ==
Williams was born in St. Louis, Missouri. He first played semi-pro baseball in 1892 and started his professional baseball career in 1896. In 1897, he established himself as a premiere power hitter, slugging 31 home runs for the Western Association's St. Joseph Saints. He hit more homers than any two other players in the league combined, and he also paced the circuit in slugging percentage and total bases. In 1898, Williams' power dropped off when he moved up to the class A Western League. However, he did raise his batting average to .343 (third in the league) and still led the WL in slugging percentage at .494.

Williams was then purchased by the Pittsburgh Pirates. He was the team's starting third baseman in 1899 and made an immediate impact. In May and June of that year, he ran off a 26-game hitting streak. He continued to rip extra-base hits throughout the entire season and eventually ranked sixth in the National League in doubles (28), first in triples (27), and third in home runs (9). In August and September, Williams had another long hitting streak, this time reaching 27 games before being stopped. The streak set an MLB rookie record that was not broken until 1987; it is still a Pittsburgh Pirates team record. The 27 triples are also an MLB rookie record. Williams ended the season with a .354 batting average.

In 1900, Williams slumped badly, and his statistics all declined from the previous season. He hit just .264, while his slugging percentage fell by .141 points. After the season, Williams jumped to the new American League with the Baltimore Orioles. He converted to second base and would remain at that position for the rest of his career. In 1901, Williams returned to his rookie form at the plate, batting .317 with a league-leading 21 triples. His production was similar the following year, as well, and he led his league in triples for the third time.

In 1903, the Baltimore franchise was transferred to New York. Williams played decently in the new city, but his hitting never approached his Pittsburgh and Baltimore levels again. After five years with the Highlanders, he was traded to the St. Louis Browns, where he finished out his major league career. He hit just .195 in 1909 and played his final MLB game on October 3.

Williams played for the American Association's Minneapolis Millers from 1910 to 1915. No longer facing major league quality pitching, he batted over .310 in both 1910 and 1911 and was one of the league's best sluggers. He helped the Millers win four AA pennants during his time there before retiring after the 1915 season, by which time he was 38 years old.

In 1457 games over 11 seasons, Williams posted a .275 batting average (1508-for-5485) with 780 runs, 242 doubles, 138 triples, 796 RBI, 151 stolen bases, 474 bases on balls, .337 on-base percentage and .396 fielding percentage. He finished his career with a .945 fielding percentage. He played 1176 games at second base, 275 games at third base and 4 games at shortstop.

After his baseball career ended, Williams held various jobs, including one as an area scout and coach for the Cincinnati Reds. He was married to Nannie May Smith in 1900, and the marriage lasted until her death in 1949. They had two sons.

Jimmy Williams died at his summer home in St. Petersburg, Florida on January 16, 1965 after being in failing health. He was 88 years old. His funeral services were held in Minneapolis, Minnesota.

== See also ==
- List of Major League Baseball career triples leaders
- List of Major League Baseball annual triples leaders
- List of Major League Baseball single-game hits leaders
