= George Treadway =

American baseball player (1866–1928)

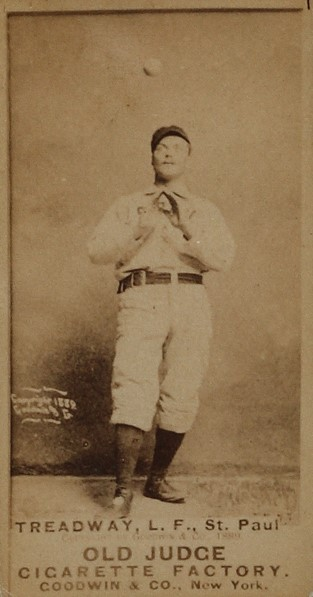
- 1889 baseball card of Treadway
- Outfielder
- Born: November 11, 1866; Greenup County, Kentucky, U.S.
- Died: November 5, 1928 (aged 61); Riverside, California, U.S.
- Batted: Left Threw: Left

MLB debut
- April 27, 1893, for the Baltimore Orioles

Last MLB appearance
- June 21, 1896, for the Louisville Colonels

MLB statistics
- Batting average: .285
- Home runs: 13
- Runs batted in: 227
- Stats at Baseball Reference

Teams
- Baltimore Orioles (1893); Brooklyn Grooms (1894–1895); Louisville Colonels (1896)

George B. Treadway (November 11, 1866 – November 5, 1928) was an American baseball player in the National League from 1893 to 1896. He played for the Baltimore Orioles for one season, the Brooklyn Grooms for two seasons, and finished off his career with two games for the Louisville Colonels. He was a lifetime .285 hitter, with 13 home runs and 227 runs batted in. He did have a solid year in 1894 with Brooklyn, batting .330, hitting 26 triples, and driving in 102 runs.
