= Perry Werden =

American baseball player and coach (1865–1934)

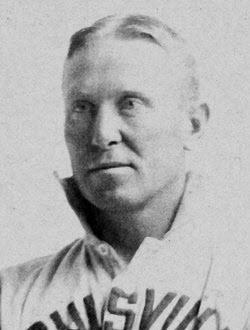
- Werden with the Louisville Colonels in 1897
- First baseman
- Born: July 21, 1861; St. Louis, Missouri, U.S.
- Died: January 9, 1934 (aged 72); Minneapolis, Minnesota, U.S.
- Batted: Right Threw: Right

Major league debut
- April 24, 1884, for the St. Louis Maroons

Last major league appearance
- October 3, 1897, for the Louisville Colonels

Major league statistics
- Batting average: .282
- Hits: 774
- Runs batted in: 439
- Stats at Baseball Reference

Teams
- St. Louis Maroons (1884); Washington Nationals (1888); Toledo Maumees (1890); Baltimore Orioles (1891); St. Louis Browns (1892–1893); Louisville Colonels (1897)

Perry Wheritt Werden (July 21, 1861 – January 9, 1934), nicknamed "Peach Pie Perry" and "Moose", was an American professional baseball player who primarily played first base. During a professional career that spanned 25 years, he played for six major league clubs: the St. Louis Maroons, Washington Nationals, Toledo Maumees, Baltimore Orioles, St. Louis Browns, and Louisville Colonels. He also played for a number of minor league teams, most notably the Minneapolis Millers of the Western League.

While playing for Minneapolis, Werden set the single season record for home runs in Organized Baseball twice in two years, hitting 43 in 1894 and 45 in 1895. The latter would stand as the record until 1920, when Babe Ruth hit 54 home runs for the New York Yankees.

== Career ==
Werden played as a pitcher in 1884 where he had a 12–1 win–loss record (leading the Union Association in winning percentage at .923). During this season, he helped the Maroons win the first and only Union Association pennant.

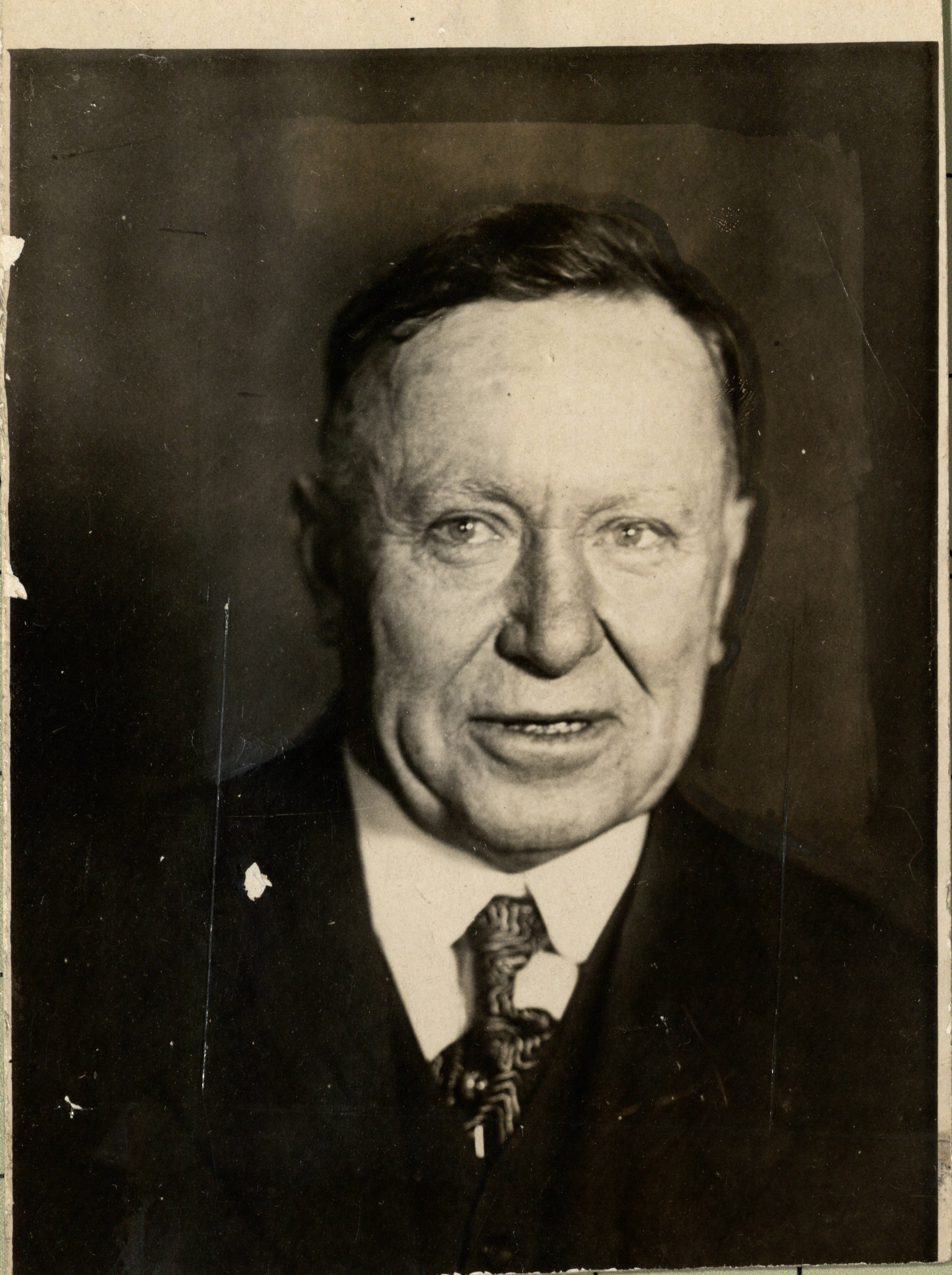
Called the "Original Pie King" and known as a home-run hitter, Werden played for the Minneapolis Millers in the late 1890s.

Werden had a remarkable minor league career. For the Minneapolis Millers of the Western League in 1894, he hit .417 with 42 home runs. The next season, he improved in both categories, hitting .428 with 45 home runs. These were astounding home run totals for the time (helped by the short outfield fence distance at their home field): for example, Sam Thompson led the National League in home runs with 18 in 1895. No one would hit more than 29 until Babe Ruth hit 54 in 1920. Werden retired with a career .341 batting average with five home run titles in the minor leagues.

He died of a heart attack on January 9, 1934, in Minneapolis, Minnesota at the age of 68, and was buried at Bellefontaine Cemetery in St. Louis.

== See also ==
- List of Major League Baseball annual triples leaders

== Sources ==
- Career statistics from Baseball Reference · Baseball Reference (Minors) · Retrosheet · Baseball Almanac
