= George Case (baseball) =

American baseball player (1915–1989)

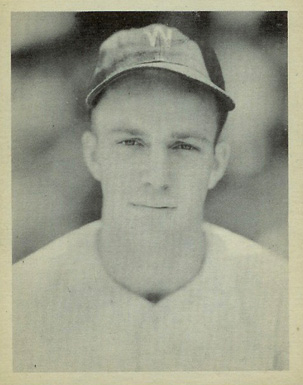
- Case's 1939 Bowman baseball card
- Outfielder
- Born: November 11, 1915; Trenton, New Jersey, U.S.
- Died: January 23, 1989 (aged 73); Trenton, New Jersey, U.S.
- Batted: Right Threw: Right

MLB debut
- September 8, 1937, for the Washington Senators

Last MLB appearance
- August 3, 1947, for the Washington Senators

MLB statistics
- Batting average: .282
- Home runs: 21
- Runs batted in: 377
- Stolen bases: 349
- Stats at Baseball Reference

Teams
- Washington Senators (1937–1945); Cleveland Indians (1946); Washington Senators (1947)

Career highlights and awards
- 4× All-Star (1939, 1943–1945); 6× AL stolen base leader (1939–1943, 1946)

George Washington Case Jr. (November 11, 1915 – January 23, 1989) was an American professional baseball outfielder and manager who played for the Washington Senators for most of his eleven-year career from 1937 to 1947. During his playing career, Case was widely considered the fastest man in the sport and set numerous records for stolen bases, leading the major leagues in steals for a record five consecutive seasons before his career was cut short by injuries. He was also the head coach of the Rutgers Scarlet Knights from 1950 to 1960, leading the team to its only College World Series appearance and retiring as the winningest head coach in school history.

As of his retirement as a player in 1947, Case ranked ninth in American League history and third in Senators history with 349 career stolen bases, and he had the most stolen bases of any player between 1930 and 1960. As of 2026, he is the only player in history to lead both major leagues in stolen bases for five consecutive seasons and tied Ty Cobb with six American League stolen base titles, a record later broken by Luis Aparicio.

== Early life and education ==
George Washington Case Jr. was born on November 11, 1915 in Trenton, New Jersey to George and Clara (née McIntyre) Case. George Sr. was a butcher and successful businessman who had popularized pork roll through his store Case's, which he founded in 1874. He had also been a noted sprinter as a young man. George Jr. had two sisters, Audrey and Gladys, and one half-brother from his father's previous marriage, W. Clifford Case. His half-brother was a former professional baseball player who had retired to run Case's, and he encouraged young George Jr. to play baseball and basketball.

After attending Gregory Elementary School and Junior High Three in Trenton, Case graduated from Trenton Central High School in 1934, where he was first-team all-New Jersey in both baseball and basketball. He earned the nicknamed "Casey" after his penchant for reciting Casey at the Bat to teammates and relatives and played in a 1934 exhibition game with Philadelphia Athletics star Jimmie Foxx, who became a personal friend and would visit the Case family in Trenton. After graduating from Trenton High, Case weighed whether to accept a scholarship to Brown University or go professional; he attended the Peddie School from 1934 to 1936 while continuing to try out for major league teams.

== Professional career ==
=== Minor leagues ===
Case was first scouted by Athletics owner-manager Connie Mack, who advised Case to switch from second baseman to outfielder, where he remained for his entire career. However, the Athletics did not need another outfielder, and Mack recommended Case to Washington Senators owner Clark Griffith. He was signed by Washington scout Joe Cambria in 1936.

Case joined the York White Roses of the New York–Penn League, but the team was quickly purchased by his half-brother Cliff and relocated to Trenton as the Trenton Senators. During two seasons in the minor leagues, Case batted .313 in 175 games.

=== Washington Senators (1937–45) ===
Case made his major league debut with the Senators in September 1937. After failing to get a hit in his first two games, Case finished the season strong, batting .289 in 93 at-bats. In 1938, his first full season, Case hit .305 in 107 games. His breakout season came in 1939, when Case hit .302 and led the Senators in runs scored (103) and the entire American League in steals (51). He was selected for an All-Star Game for the first time and named New Jersey Professional Athlete of the Year. Case would dominate the American League stolen bases leaderboard for the next eight years, winning six stolen base titles. On April 30, 1939, Case caught the final ball hit by Lou Gehrig before his retirement due to ALS, and he was on the field during Gehrig's farewell address at Yankee Stadium.

Case continued to blossom into a star in the early 1940s and was widely considered the fastest man in the baseball. Clyde Milan, who set the Senators record for stolen bases, said, "George Case was the fastest man ever to play baseball. ... He was faster than Ty Cobb, Eddie Collins, [and] Max Carey." In 1943, Case was clocked rounding the bases from a standing start in 13.5 seconds, breaking a record set by Hans Lobert. He led both major leagues in stolen bases for five consecutive seasons from 1939 to 1943, a record which still stands as of 2026, and his 61 stolen bases in 1943 were the most of any player in the first four decades of the live-ball era, from 1921 until 1961. Case's speed also made him very difficult to turn a double play against; as of 2013, Case's rate of one double play per 94 at-bats ranked among the top five in baseball history.

In addition to his raw speed, Case was also known for his judicious baserunning. According to author Mark Stang, "[Case's] raw speed and ability to read pitchers and catchers made him the most feared base-stealer in either league." In 1986, Nicholas Dawidoff remarked, "Like many great base-stealers, Case didn't take a big lead, but he was able to get a phenomenal jump on the pitcher." Case himself later claimed that he could have stolen 100 bases in a season in the modern game but was limited by situational baserunning. "Baseball was played a lot differently then," he said. "I never stole third with two out or stole second when we were three or four runs down. In the 1940s, there were right and wrong times to run." Case was also expected to decide when to run on his own, with a signal from the third base coach, and claimed that he was never given a sign by Bucky Harris or Ossie Bluege during his time in Washington.

In addition to his remarkable baserunning, Case continued to develop at the plate and in the field, setting career highs in hits in 1940, leading the American League in outfield assists in 1941, and batting a career-high .320 in 1942. However, Case suffered badly from back and shoulder injuries, and his career rapidly declined in 1944 and 1945. His batting average and run production fell off, and he was beaten by New York Yankees star Snuffy Stirnweiss for the stolen base title in each season.

=== Cleveland Indians (1946) ===
In December 1945, Case was traded to the Cleveland Indians for veteran outfielder Jeff Heath. Although Indians manager Lou Boudreau remarked that he was relieved that he would no longer have to worry about "that pest" on the bases, Case took a much more conservative approach to baserunning and finished the season with only 28 stolen bases. However, this was enough to secure him his sixth and final stolen base title, tying Ty Cobb for the American League record.

During Case's only season in Cleveland, Indians owner Bill Veeck staged a promotion matching Case against Jesse Owens in a 100-yard race. Owens won by one-tenth of one second. In another promotional race against Senators rookie Gil Coan, Case ran a 100-yard dash in ten seconds flat, despite suffering from a bad back.

=== Washington Senators (1947) ===
In March 1947, Case was traded back to the Senators for Roger Wolff. After hitting .150 average in 36 games, he played his final major league game on August 3, 1947 and announced his retirement at the age of 31. His 321 stolen bases ranked third in Senators history and ninth in American League history.

== Coaching career ==
Immediately after retiring from baseball, Case opened George Case's Sports Center, a sporting goods store in Trenton, and ran it until 1960.

=== Rutgers University (1950–60) ===
In 1950, Case was hired to coach the Rutgers University baseball team. "I've missed baseball a lot since retiring," he told the Central New Jersey Home News. "There have been some professional managing offers but I felt that they would interfere too much with my sporting goods business in Trenton." As a head coach, Case encouraged a small ball style similar to his own; their home field had a very long left-field line, making it very difficult to hit home runs and leading the team to emphasize contact and speed to score. During his first year as a coach, the team finished the regular season 17-4-1 and qualified for the College World Series. In their opening game, they rallied to defeat Texas, the defending national champions, 4-2. However, in the winners' bracket final, Rutgers lost in extra innings to Washington State and ultimately finished third after losing to Texas, who repeated as champions. As of 2020, this was the only College World Series appearance in Rutgers history.

Over his ten years as head coach, Rutgers compiled a record of 116 wins, 84 losses, and 3 draws, making Case the winningest coach in Rutgers history. His records for wins and winning percentage were later surpassed by Fred Hill. Case's son, George III, played for Rutgers during his final season as head coach. He also hosted a daily radio show on WTTM from 1958 to 1960.

=== Other coaching and scouting roles ===
In 1961, Case accepted an opportunity to return to the major leagues as the third base coach for the new expansion Senators under his former teammate and friend, Mickey Vernon. He remained with the Seantors from 1961 until 1963.

From 1965 until 1966, he managed the Hawaii Islanders in the Pacific Coast League. His final major league job was with the Minnesota Twins in 1968. He managed the Oneonta Yankees from 1969 to 1972, winning Manager of the Year twice, and was a scout for the Yankees, Texas Rangers, and Seattle Mariners from 1974 to 1979. His final job in baseball was as a minor league batting instructor for the Seattle Mariners from 1980 until 1985, when illness forced him to retire, ending a nearly five-decade career in baseball.

== Personal life and death ==
Case married his neighbor and childhood sweetheart, Helen Farrell, in 1937. They had two children: George III, who was executive director of the Society for American Baseball Research from 2000 to 2002, and Robin Davis.

Case was a lifelong duck hunter and during his retirement served as a guide for hunters in Barnegat Bay. One of his grandsons played professional hockey for the Pittsburgh Penguins organization and in Sweden.

=== Death and legacy ===
Near the end of his life, Case lived in Morrisville, Bucks County, Pennsylvania. He died of emphysema on January 23, 1989 in Trenton. He was buried at the First Presbyterian Church Cemetery of Ewing.

In addition to his major league records, Case was inducted into the Peddie School Athletic Hall of Fame, where was named Athlete of the Century, and the New Jersey Sportswriters Hall of Fame. He was posthumously inducted into the Washington Hall of Stars, the Trenton Thunder Hall of Fame, and the New Jersey Interscholastic Sports Hall of Fame. After his death, George III compiled interviews and clips from his father's life and career into a short documentary film, Around the League: 1939–1946, which is dedicated to the memory of the late George Case Jr.

== See also ==
- List of Major League Baseball career stolen bases leaders
- List of Major League Baseball annual runs scored leaders
- List of Major League Baseball annual stolen base leaders
- Major League Baseball titles leaders

== Sources ==
- Career statistics from Baseball Reference · Baseball Reference (Minors) · Retrosheet · Baseball Almanac
