= Bill North =

American baseball player (born 1948)

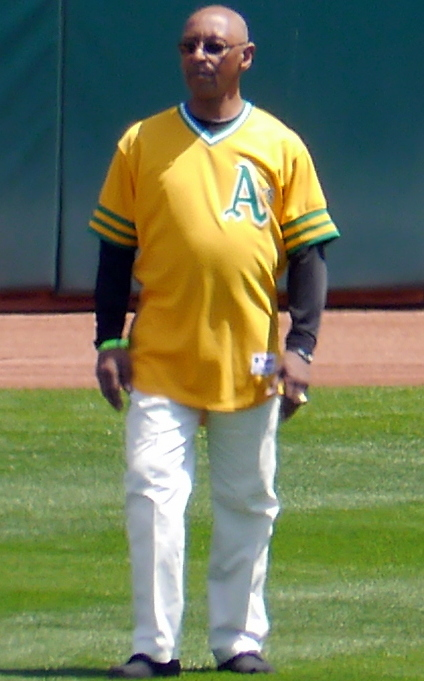
- North in 2013
- Center fielder
- Born: May 15, 1948 (age 78); Seattle, Washington, U.S.
- Batted: Switch Threw: Right

MLB debut
- September 3, 1971, for the Chicago Cubs

Last MLB appearance
- June 11, 1981, for the San Francisco Giants

MLB statistics
- Batting average: .261
- Home runs: 20
- Runs batted in: 230
- Stolen bases: 395
- Stats at Baseball Reference

Teams
- Chicago Cubs (1971–1972); Oakland Athletics (1973–1978); Los Angeles Dodgers (1978); San Francisco Giants (1979–1981)

Career highlights and awards
- World Series champion (1974); 2× AL stolen base leader (1974, 1976)

William Alex North (born May 15, 1948) is an American former center fielder in Major League Baseball, from 1971 to 1981. He played for the Chicago Cubs (1971–72), Oakland Athletics (1973–78), Los Angeles Dodgers (1978) and San Francisco Giants (1979–81). He was a switch hitter and threw right-handed.

In an 11-year career, North compiled a career batting average of .261 (1016-for-3900) with 20 home runs and 230 runs batted in. One of the fastest men in the game, he also recorded 395 stolen bases.

== Career ==
=== 1969–75 ===
North was drafted by the Cubs in the 12th round of the 1969 amateur draft. The speedy outfielder was traded to the Athletics after the 1972 season and started in center field on Oakland's 1973 World Series champions. Batting leadoff, he posted career highs in batting average (.285) and runs scored (98). However, on September 20, in a loss to the Minnesota Twins, North tripped over first base; the resulting ankle sprain not only cost him the American League stolen base title (his 53 steals placed him second, only one behind Tommy Harper), it also sidelined him for the remainder of the season and cost him the chance to play in the post-season.

In 1974, North led the league in steals, with 54, on an Athletics team that won its third consecutive World Series title. He was also involved in a not-so-memorable moment on June 5 of that season. He and Reggie Jackson engaged in a clubhouse fight at Detroit's Tiger Stadium that resulted in Jackson injuring his shoulder. Ray Fosse, attempting to separate the combatants, suffered a crushed disk in his neck, costing him the next three months on the disabled list.

=== 1976–81 ===
North also led the American League in steals in 1976 with 75, at the time the second-highest in a season in franchise history, trailing only Eddie Collins' 81 in 1910 with what were then the Philadelphia Athletics. As of 2012, only Rickey Henderson has stolen more bases for the Athletics, surpassing North's total three times, each with at least 100 steals: an even 100 in 1980, a still-standing Major League record 130 in 1982 and 108 in 1983.

Injuries limited North to only 56 games in 1977, and after a slow start in 1978, the Athletics traded him to the Dodgers for Glenn Burke. His Dodgers won the National League pennant, but lost to the New York Yankees in the World Series. After the season, the San Francisco Giants signed him as a free agent; in 1979 he returned to form with 58 stolen bases, the most by a Giant in the live-ball era. Injuries, however, kept him out of 20 games and prevented him from breaking the overall franchise record of 62. After a similar season in 1980, he tailed off in 1981.

=== Notable moments and statistics ===
In addition to stealing bases, North also utilized his speed in the field to lead American League outfielders three times in total chances per game, twice in putouts, and once each in assists and double plays. In the second game of a July 28, 1974 doubleheader, he accomplished an unassisted double play against the Chicago White Sox. North caught Brian Downing's fly ball and continued to the second-base bag to double up Dick Allen, who had been running on the play.

North was the first player in Oakland Athletics history to serve as a designated hitter. He went 2-for-5 in the Athletics's 1973 season opener, an 8–3 loss to the Minnesota Twins at Oakland–Alameda County Coliseum.

North was an ineffective hitter in postseason play; in two World Series, two American League Championship Series and one National League Championship Series covering 20 games, North posted only a .051 batting average (3-for-59), among the lowest batting averages in the postseason for a position player. However, he made the most of his baserunning opportunities, scoring 8 runs, drawing 7 base on balls, stealing 3 bases and recording 3 RBI.

Former Dodgers teammate Dusty Baker invited North as an honorary coach for the 2023 MLB All-Star Game, played at T-Mobile Park in Seattle. As players, North and Baker were teammates in 1978. Baker was manager of the American League All-Star team, having managed the Houston Astros to the 2022 World Series.

== See also ==
- List of Major League Baseball career stolen bases leaders
- List of Major League Baseball annual stolen base leaders
