= List of Major League Baseball annual stolen base leaders =

Major League Baseball recognizes stolen base leaders in the American League and National League each season.

== American League ==
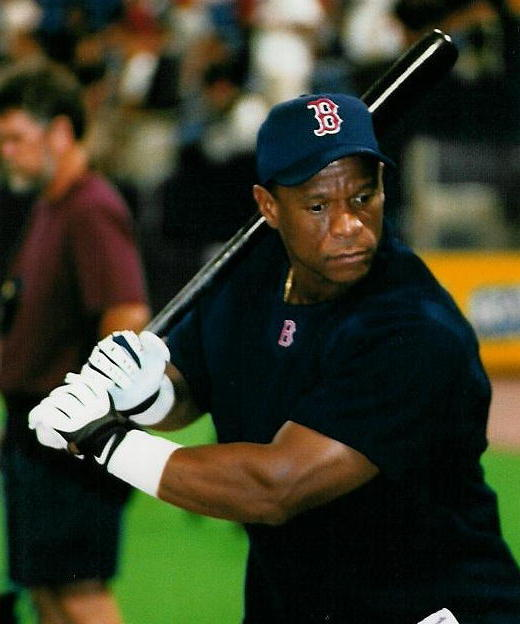
Rickey Henderson led the American League in stolen bases twelve times, more times than any other player.

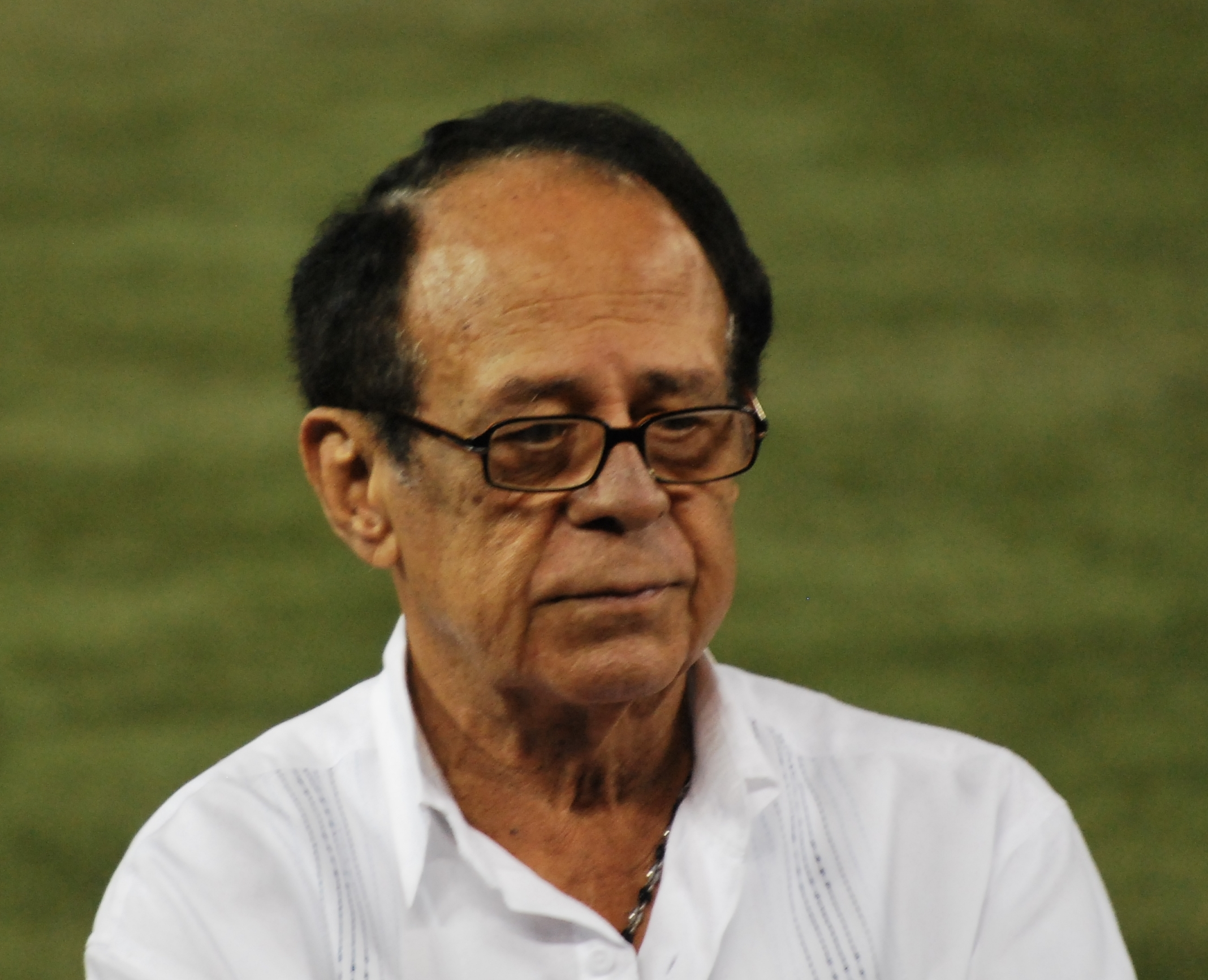
Luis Aparicio led the American League in steals in nine consecutive seasons, the longest streak of any player.

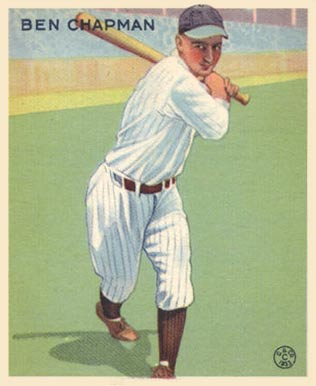
Ben Chapman was the first player to lead the American League in stolen bases with different teams.

Year	Player	Team(s)	Stolen Bases
1901	Frank Isbell	Chicago White Sox	52
1902	Topsy Hartsel	Philadelphia Athletics	47
1903	Harry Bay	Cleveland Naps	45
1904	Harry Bay; Elmer Flick	Cleveland Naps	38
1905	Danny Hoffman	Philadelphia Athletics	46
1906	John Anderson; Elmer Flick	Washington Senators; Cleveland Naps	39
1907	Ty Cobb	Detroit Tigers	49
1908	Patsy Dougherty	Chicago White Sox	47
1909	Ty Cobb	Detroit Tigers	76
1910	Eddie Collins	Philadelphia Athletics	81
1911	Ty Cobb	Detroit Tigers	83
1912	Clyde Milan	Washington Senators	88
1913	Clyde Milan	Washington Senators	75
1914	Fritz Maisel	New York Yankees	74
1915	Ty Cobb	Detroit Tigers	96
1916	Ty Cobb	Detroit Tigers	68
1917	Ty Cobb	Detroit Tigers	55
1918	George Sisler	St. Louis Browns	45
1919	Eddie Collins	Chicago White Sox	33
1920	Sam Rice	Washington Senators	63
1921	George Sisler	St. Louis Browns	35
1922	George Sisler	St. Louis Browns	51
1923	Eddie Collins	Chicago White Sox	48
1924	Eddie Collins	Chicago White Sox	42
1925	Johnny Mostil	Chicago White Sox	43
1926	Johnny Mostil	Chicago White Sox	35
1927	George Sisler	St. Louis Browns	27
1928	Buddy Myer	Boston Red Sox	30
1929	Charlie Gehringer	Detroit Tigers	27
1930	Marty McManus	Detroit Tigers	23
1931	Ben Chapman	New York Yankees	61
1932	Ben Chapman	New York Yankees	38
1933	Ben Chapman	New York Yankees	27
1934	Billy Werber	Boston Red Sox	40
1935	Billy Werber	Boston Red Sox	29
1936	Lyn Lary	St. Louis Browns	37
1937	Ben Chapman; Billy Werber	Washington/Boston; Philadelphia Athletics	35
1938	Frankie Crosetti	New York Yankees	27
1939	George Case	Washington Senators	51
1940	George Case	Washington Senators	35
1941	George Case	Washington Senators	33
1942	George Case	Washington Senators	44
1943	George Case	Washington Senators	61
1944	Snuffy Stirnweiss	New York Yankees	55
1945	Snuffy Stirnweiss	New York Yankees	33
1946	George Case	Cleveland Indians	28
1947	Bob Dillinger	St. Louis Browns	34
1948	Bob Dillinger	St. Louis Browns	28
1949	Bob Dillinger	St. Louis Browns	20
1950	Dom DiMaggio	Boston Red Sox	15
1951	Minnie Miñoso	Cleveland Indians; Chicago White Sox	31
1952	Minnie Miñoso	Chicago White Sox	22
1953	Minnie Miñoso	Chicago White Sox	25
1954	Jackie Jensen	Boston Red Sox	22
1955	Jim Rivera	Chicago White Sox	25
1956	Luis Aparicio	Chicago White Sox	21
1957	Luis Aparicio	Chicago White Sox	28
1958	Luis Aparicio	Chicago White Sox	29
1959	Luis Aparicio	Chicago White Sox	56
1960	Luis Aparicio	Chicago White Sox	51
1961	Luis Aparicio	Chicago White Sox	53
1962	Luis Aparicio	Chicago White Sox	31
1963	Luis Aparicio	Baltimore Orioles	40
1964	Luis Aparicio	Baltimore Orioles	57
1965	Bert Campaneris	Kansas City Athletics	51
1966	Bert Campaneris	Kansas City Athletics	52
1967	Bert Campaneris	Kansas City Athletics	55
1968	Bert Campaneris	Oakland Athletics	62
1969	Tommy Harper	Seattle Pilots	73
1970	Bert Campaneris	Oakland Athletics	42
1971	Amos Otis	Kansas City Royals	52
1972	Bert Campaneris	Oakland Athletics	52
1973	Tommy Harper	Boston Red Sox	54
1974	Billy North	Oakland Athletics	54
1975	Mickey Rivers	California Angels	70
1976	Billy North	Oakland Athletics	75
1977	Freddie Patek	Kansas City Royals	53
1978	Ron LeFlore	Detroit Tigers	68
1979	Willie Wilson	Kansas City Royals	83
1980	Rickey Henderson	Oakland Athletics	100
1981	Rickey Henderson	Oakland Athletics	56
1982	Rickey Henderson	Oakland Athletics	130
1983	Rickey Henderson	Oakland Athletics	108
1984	Rickey Henderson	Oakland Athletics	66
1985	Rickey Henderson	New York Yankees	80
1986	Rickey Henderson	New York Yankees	87
1987	Harold Reynolds	Seattle Mariners	60
1988	Rickey Henderson	New York Yankees	93
1989	Rickey Henderson	New York Yankees; Oakland Athletics	77
1990	Rickey Henderson	Oakland Athletics	65
1991	Rickey Henderson	Oakland Athletics	58
1992	Kenny Lofton	Cleveland Indians	66
1993	Kenny Lofton	Cleveland Indians	70
1994	Kenny Lofton	Cleveland Indians	60
1995	Kenny Lofton	Cleveland Indians	54
1996	Kenny Lofton	Cleveland Indians	75
1997	Brian Hunter	Detroit Tigers	74
1998	Rickey Henderson	Oakland Athletics	66
1999	Brian Hunter	Detroit Tigers; Seattle Mariners	44
2000	Johnny Damon	Kansas City Royals	46
2001	Ichiro Suzuki	Seattle Mariners	56
2002	Alfonso Soriano	New York Yankees	41
2003	Carl Crawford	Tampa Bay Devil Rays	55
2004	Carl Crawford	Tampa Bay Devil Rays	59
2005	Chone Figgins	Los Angeles Angels of Anaheim	62
2006	Carl Crawford	Tampa Bay Devil Rays	58
2007	Carl Crawford; Brian Roberts	Tampa Bay Devil Rays; Baltimore Orioles	50
2008	Jacoby Ellsbury	Boston Red Sox	50
2009	Jacoby Ellsbury	Boston Red Sox	70
2010	Juan Pierre	Chicago White Sox	68
2011	Coco Crisp; Brett Gardner	Oakland Athletics; New York Yankees	49
2012	Mike Trout	Los Angeles Angels of Anaheim	49
2013	Jacoby Ellsbury	Boston Red Sox	52
2014	Jose Altuve	Houston Astros	56
2015	Jose Altuve	Houston Astros	38
2016	Rajai Davis	Cleveland Indians	43
2017	Whit Merrifield	Kansas City Royals	34
2018	Whit Merrifield	Kansas City Royals	45
2019	Mallex Smith	Seattle Mariners	46
2020	Adalberto Mondesí	Kansas City Royals	24
2021	Whit Merrifield	Kansas City Royals	40
2022	Jorge Mateo	Baltimore Orioles	35
2023	Esteury Ruiz	Oakland Athletics	67
2024	José Caballero	Tampa Bay Rays	44
2025	José Caballero	Tampa Bay Rays; New York Yankees	49
2026	Chandler Simpson	Tampa Bay Rays	46

== National League ==
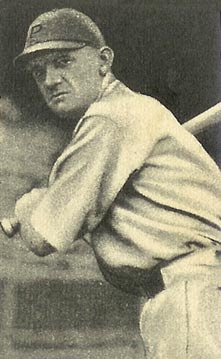
Max Carey led the National League in stolen bases ten times, the most times of any player.

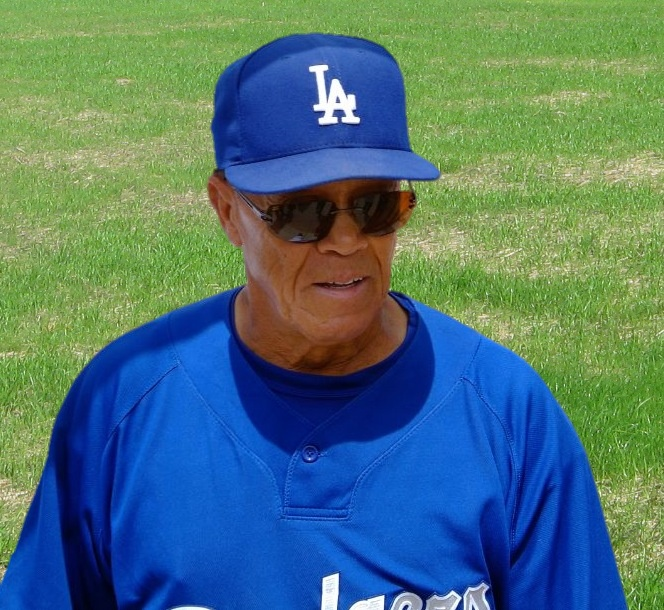
Maury Wills led the National League in stolen bases in six consecutive seasons. Vince Coleman is the only other player to do so.

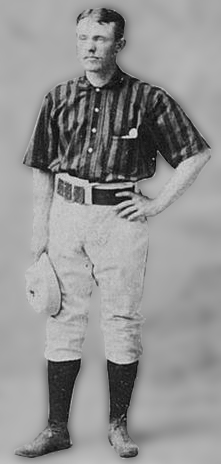
John Montgomery Ward was the first player to lead the National League in stolen bases for different teams.

Year	Player	Team(s)	Stolen Bases
1886	Ed Andrews	Philadelphia Quakers	56
1887	John Montgomery Ward	New York Giants	111
1888	Dummy Hoy	Washington Nationals	82
1889	Jim Fogarty	Philadelphia Quakers	99
1890	Billy Hamilton	Philadelphia Phillies	102
1891	Billy Hamilton	Philadelphia Phillies	111
1892	John Montgomery Ward	Brooklyn Grooms	88
1893	Tom Brown	Louisville Colonels	66
1894	Billy Hamilton	Philadelphia Phillies	98
1895	Billy Hamilton	Philadelphia Phillies	97
1896	Joe Kelley	Baltimore Orioles	87
1897	Bill Lange	Chicago Colts	73
1898	Ed Delahanty	Philadelphia Phillies	58
1899	Jimmy Sheckard	Baltimore Orioles	77
1900	Patsy Donovan; George Van Haltren	St. Louis Cardinals; New York Giants	45
1901	Honus Wagner	Pittsburgh Pirates	49
1902	Honus Wagner	Pittsburgh Pirates	42
1903	Frank Chance; Jimmy Sheckard	Chicago Cubs; Brooklyn Superbas	67
1904	Honus Wagner	Pittsburgh Pirates	53
1905	Art Devlin; Billy Maloney	New York Giants; Chicago Cubs	59
1906	Frank Chance	Chicago Cubs	57
1907	Honus Wagner	Pittsburgh Pirates	61
1908	Honus Wagner	Pittsburgh Pirates	53
1909	Bob Bescher	Cincinnati Reds	54
1910	Bob Bescher	Cincinnati Reds	70
1911	Bob Bescher	Cincinnati Reds	81
1912	Bob Bescher	Cincinnati Reds	67
1913	Max Carey	Pittsburgh Pirates	61
1914	George Burns	New York Giants	62
1915	Max Carey	Pittsburgh Pirates	36
1916	Max Carey	Pittsburgh Pirates	63
1917	Max Carey	Pittsburgh Pirates	46
1918	Max Carey	Pittsburgh Pirates	58
1919	George Burns	New York Giants	40
1920	Max Carey	Pittsburgh Pirates	52
1921	Frankie Frisch	New York Giants	49
1922	Max Carey	Pittsburgh Pirates	51
1923	Max Carey	Pittsburgh Pirates	51
1924	Max Carey	Pittsburgh Pirates	49
1925	Max Carey	Pittsburgh Pirates	46
1926	Kiki Cuyler	Pittsburgh Pirates	35
1927	Frankie Frisch	St. Louis Cardinals	48
1928	Kiki Cuyler	Chicago Cubs	37
1929	Kiki Cuyler	Chicago Cubs	43
1930	Kiki Cuyler	Chicago Cubs	37
1931	Frankie Frisch	St. Louis Cardinals	28
1932	Chuck Klein	Philadelphia Phillies	20
1933	Pepper Martin	St. Louis Cardinals	26
1934	Pepper Martin	St. Louis Cardinals	23
1935	Augie Galan	Chicago Cubs	22
1936	Pepper Martin	St. Louis Cardinals	23
1937	Augie Galan	Chicago Cubs	23
1938	Stan Hack	Chicago Cubs	16
1939	Stan Hack; Lee Handley	Chicago Cubs; Pittsburgh Pirates	17
1940	Lonny Frey	Cincinnati Reds	22
1941	Danny Murtaugh	Philadelphia Phillies	18
1942	Pete Reiser	Brooklyn Dodgers	20
1943	Arky Vaughan	Brooklyn Dodgers	20
1944	Johnny Barrett	Pittsburgh Pirates	28
1945	Red Schoendienst	St. Louis Cardinals	26
1946	Pete Reiser	Brooklyn Dodgers	34
1947	Jackie Robinson	Brooklyn Dodgers	29
1948	Richie Ashburn	Philadelphia Phillies	32
1949	Jackie Robinson	Brooklyn Dodgers	37
1950	Sam Jethroe	Boston Braves	35
1951	Sam Jethroe	Boston Braves	35
1952	Pee Wee Reese	Brooklyn Dodgers	30
1953	Bill Bruton	Milwaukee Braves	26
1954	Bill Bruton	Milwaukee Braves	34
1955	Bill Bruton	Milwaukee Braves	25
1956	Willie Mays	New York Giants	40
1957	Willie Mays	New York Giants	38
1958	Willie Mays	San Francisco Giants	31
1959	Willie Mays	San Francisco Giants	27
1960	Maury Wills	Los Angeles Dodgers	50
1961	Maury Wills	Los Angeles Dodgers	35
1962	Maury Wills	Los Angeles Dodgers	104
1963	Maury Wills	Los Angeles Dodgers	40
1964	Maury Wills	Los Angeles Dodgers	53
1965	Maury Wills	Los Angeles Dodgers	94
1966	Lou Brock	St. Louis Cardinals	74
1967	Lou Brock	St. Louis Cardinals	52
1968	Lou Brock	St. Louis Cardinals	62
1969	Lou Brock	St. Louis Cardinals	53
1970	Bobby Tolan	Cincinnati Reds	57
1971	Lou Brock	St. Louis Cardinals	64
1972	Lou Brock	St. Louis Cardinals	63
1973	Lou Brock	St. Louis Cardinals	70
1974	Lou Brock	St. Louis Cardinals	118
1975	Davey Lopes	Los Angeles Dodgers	77
1976	Davey Lopes	Los Angeles Dodgers	63
1977	Frank Taveras	Pittsburgh Pirates	70
1978	Omar Moreno	Pittsburgh Pirates	71
1979	Omar Moreno	Pittsburgh Pirates	77
1980	Ron LeFlore	Montreal Expos	97
1981	Tim Raines	Montreal Expos	71
1982	Tim Raines	Montreal Expos	78
1983	Tim Raines	Montreal Expos	90
1984	Tim Raines	Montreal Expos	75
1985	Vince Coleman	St. Louis Cardinals	110
1986	Vince Coleman	St. Louis Cardinals	107
1987	Vince Coleman	St. Louis Cardinals	109
1988	Vince Coleman	St. Louis Cardinals	81
1989	Vince Coleman	St. Louis Cardinals	65
1990	Vince Coleman	St. Louis Cardinals	77
1991	Marquis Grissom	Montreal Expos	76
1992	Marquis Grissom	Montreal Expos	78
1993	Chuck Carr	Florida Marlins	58
1994	Craig Biggio	Houston Astros	39
1995	Quilvio Veras	Florida Marlins	56
1996	Eric Young	Colorado Rockies	53
1997	Tony Womack	Pittsburgh Pirates	60
1998	Tony Womack	Pittsburgh Pirates	58
1999	Tony Womack	Arizona Diamondbacks	72
2000	Luis Castillo	Florida Marlins	62
2001	Juan Pierre; Jimmy Rollins	Colorado Rockies; Philadelphia Phillies	46
2002	Luis Castillo	Florida Marlins	48
2003	Juan Pierre	Florida Marlins	65
2004	Scott Podsednik	Milwaukee Brewers	70
2005	José Reyes	New York Mets	60
2006	José Reyes	New York Mets	64
2007	José Reyes	New York Mets	78
2008	Willy Taveras	Colorado Rockies	68
2009	Michael Bourn	Houston Astros	61
2010	Michael Bourn	Houston Astros	52
2011	Michael Bourn	Houston Astros; Atlanta Braves	61
2012	Everth Cabrera	San Diego Padres	44
2013	Eric Young, Jr.	Colorado Rockies; New York Mets	46
2014	Dee Gordon	Los Angeles Dodgers	64
2015	Dee Gordon	Miami Marlins	58
2016	Jonathan Villar	Milwaukee Brewers	62
2017	Dee Gordon	Miami Marlins	60
2018	Trea Turner	Washington Nationals	43
2019	Ronald Acuña Jr.	Atlanta Braves	37
2020	Trevor Story	Colorado Rockies	15
2021	Trea Turner	Washington Nationals; Los Angeles Dodgers	32
2022	Jon Berti	Miami Marlins	41
2023	Ronald Acuña Jr.	Atlanta Braves	73
2024	Elly De La Cruz	Cincinnati Reds	67
2025	Oneil Cruz; Juan Soto	Pittsburgh Pirates; New York Mets	38
2026	Nasim Nuñez	Washington Nationals	49

== American Association ==
Year	Player	Team(s)	Stolen Bases
1886	Harry Stovey	Philadelphia Athletics	68
1887	Hugh Nicol	Cincinnati Red Stockings	138
1888	Arlie Latham	St. Louis Browns	109
1889	Billy Hamilton	Kansas City Cowboys	111
1890	Tommy McCarthy	St. Louis Browns	83
1891	Tom Brown	Boston Reds	106

== Federal League ==
Year	Player	Team(s)	Stolen Bases
1914	Benny Kauff	Indianapolis Hoosiers	75
1915	Benny Kauff	Brooklyn Tip-Tops	55

== Players' League ==
Year	Player	Team(s)	Stolen Bases
1890	Harry Stovey	Boston Reds	97

== National Association ==
Year	Player	Team(s)	Stolen Bases
1871	Mike McGeary	Troy Haymakers	20
1872	Dave Eggler	New York Mutuals	18
1873	Ross Barnes	Boston Red Stockings	43
1874	Tom Barlow	Hartford Dark Blues	17
1875	Tim Murnane	Philadelphia White Stockings	30

== See also ==
- List of Major League Baseball stolen base records
- List of Major League Baseball career stolen bases leaders
