= Bill Bruton =

American baseball player (1925–1995)

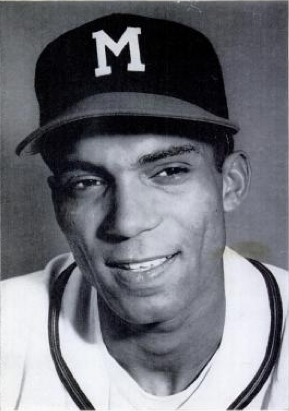
- Bruton in 1955
- Outfielder
- Born: November 9, 1925; Panola, Alabama, U.S.
- Died: December 5, 1995 (aged 70); Marshallton, Delaware, U.S.
- Batted: Left Threw: Right

MLB debut
- April 13, 1953, for the Milwaukee Braves

Last MLB appearance
- October 2, 1964, for the Detroit Tigers

MLB statistics
- Batting average: .273
- Home runs: 94
- Runs batted in: 545
- Stats at Baseball Reference

Teams
- Milwaukee Braves (1953–1960); Detroit Tigers (1961–1964)

Career highlights and awards
- 3× NL stolen base leader (1953–1955)

William Havon Bruton (November 9, 1925 – December 5, 1995) was an American Major League Baseball (MLB) center fielder who played for the Milwaukee Braves (1953–1960) and Detroit Tigers (1961–1964). Bruton batted left-handed and threw right-handed.

== Career ==
Bill Bruton, as a 27-year-old rookie, started his major league career in 1953 with the Milwaukee Braves. The team had just moved from Boston to Milwaukee. Bruton had replaced former National League's 1950 Rookie of the Year winner and first African-American player on the Braves, Sam Jethroe, on the roster. Jethroe, at the age of 35, had been demoted to the minor leagues. He had led the NL in stolen bases his first two seasons.

On April 14, 1953, his 10th-inning home run gave the Braves a 3–2 victory over the St. Louis Cardinals in Milwaukee's first major league game.

Bruton played in Milwaukee for eight seasons; he was a member of the 1957 Braves and 1958 Braves, who both played in the World Series against the New York Yankees. Bruton did not play in the 1957 World Series, which the Braves won in seven games, due to a knee injury sustained earlier in the season. In the 1958 World Series, which the Braves lost in seven games, Bruton hit a game-winning single in the tenth inning of Game 1. He played in all seven games of the Series, batting 7-for-17 (.412) with a home run and two RBIs. On August 2, 1959, Bruton hit two bases-loaded triples in one game. The feat had only been accomplished once before (Elmer Valo, 1949) and has only been accomplished once since (Duane Kuiper, 1978).

In December 1960, Bruton was traded to the Detroit Tigers, along with Dick Brown, Chuck Cottier and Terry Fox for a player to be named later and Frank Bolling. The Detroit Tigers sent Neil Chrisley (January 17, 1961) to the Milwaukee Braves to complete the trade. He spent four seasons with Detroit before retiring after the 1964 season.

In his last game at Tiger Stadium, Bruton hit a drive off the facing of the third deck, near where the retired Tiger numbers were painted, that bounced back onto the field. The ball was still rising when it hit just below the base of the right field light tower.

=== Statistics ===
In his twelve-year major league career, Bruton posted an overall .273 batting average with 94 home runs and 545 run batted in in 1,610 games. He finished his career with a .981 fielding percentage. A line-drive hitter and a fleet-footed runner, Bruton led the National League in stolen bases for three consecutive seasons (1953 through 1955), twice in triples (1956 and 1960), and once in runs scored (1960). He led off a game with a home run twelve times.

Bruton's minor league milestones include;

- tied for the Northern League lead in games played (124), and led the league in at-bats (545), runs (126), and batting average (.325) while playing for the Eau Claire Bears in 1950
- led the Western League with 27 triples while playing for the Denver Bears in 1951
- tied for the American Association lead in games played (154), at-bats (650), runs (130), hits (211), and outfield assists (22) while playing for the Milwaukee Brewers in 1952

== Personal life ==
Bruton was a graduate of Parker High School in Birmingham, Alabama, and served in the Army from 1944 through 1947.

He was a spokesman for Tareyton cigarettes in the 1960s.

In 1991, Bruton was inducted into the Delaware Sports Museum and Hall of Fame.

According to a Delaware State Police report, Bruton suffered a heart attack while driving his car in Marshallton, Delaware, near his home in Wilmington on December 5, 1995. Bruton's car veered off the road and hit a pole; after which he was pronounced dead at a local hospital. He was 70.

== See also ==
- List of Major League Baseball career triples leaders
- List of Major League Baseball annual triples leaders
- List of Major League Baseball career stolen bases leaders
- List of Major League Baseball annual stolen base leaders
- List of Major League Baseball annual runs scored leaders

Achievements
Preceded by Elmer Valo	Two bases-loaded triples in a game August 2, 1959	Succeeded by Duane Kuiper
