= Bob Bescher =

American baseball player (1884–1942)

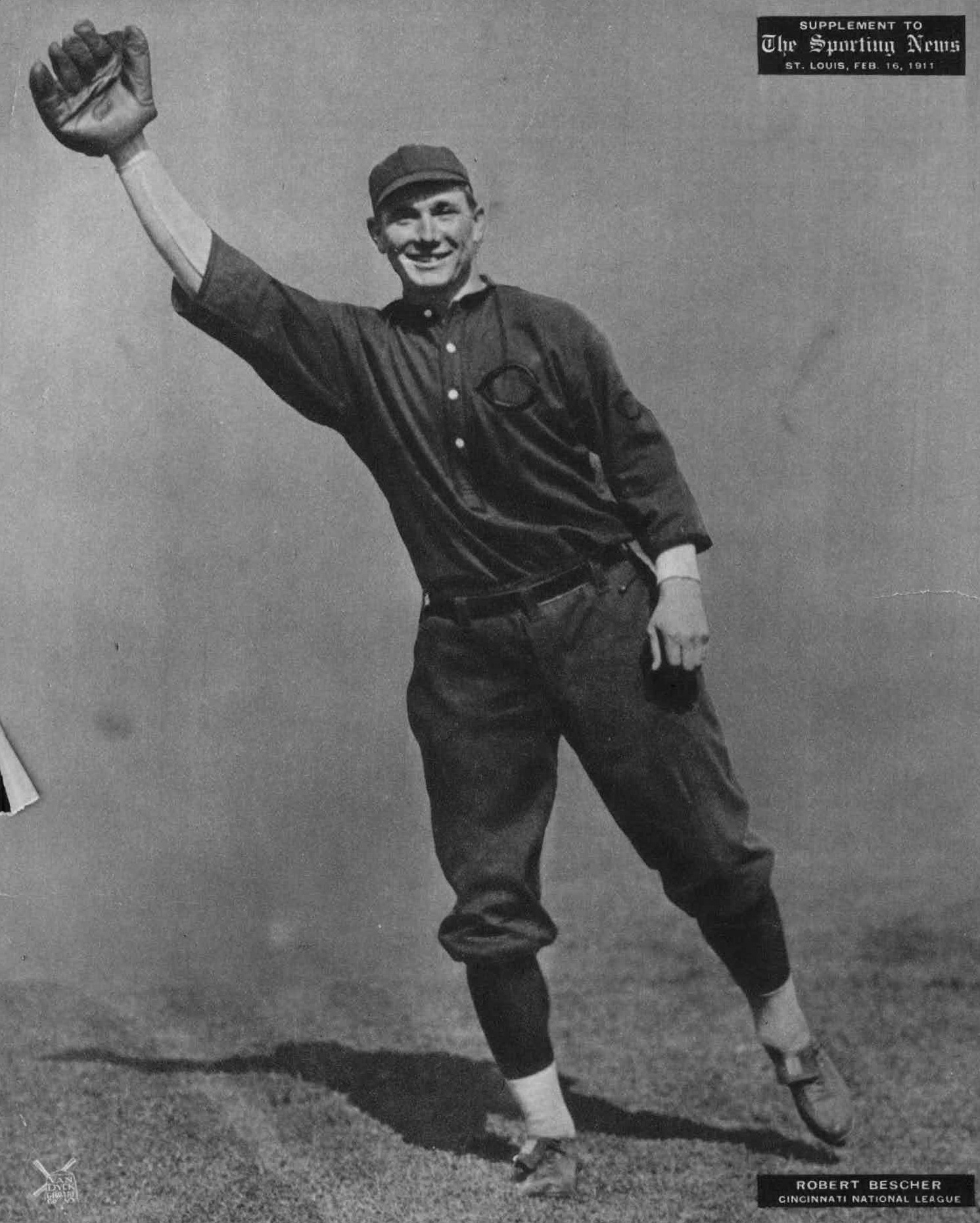
- Outfielder
- Born: February 25, 1884; London, Ohio, U.S.
- Died: November 29, 1942 (aged 58); London, Ohio, U.S.
- Batted: Both Threw: Left

MLB debut
- September 5, 1908, for the Cincinnati Reds

Last MLB appearance
- September 1, 1918, for the Cleveland Indians

MLB statistics
- Batting average: .258
- Home runs: 28
- Runs batted in: 345
- Stolen bases: 428
- Stats at Baseball Reference

Teams
- Cincinnati Reds (1908–1913); New York Giants (1914); St. Louis Cardinals (1915–1917); Cleveland Indians (1918)

Career highlights and awards
- 4× NL stolen base leader (1909–1912); NL runs scored leader (1912)

Robert Henry Bescher (February 25, 1884 – November 29, 1942) was an American professional baseball outfielder who played 11 seasons in the major leagues. Born in London, Ohio, he played his best seasons with the Cincinnati Reds, and was one of the National League's best base stealers during his time.

Bescher originally attended the University of Notre Dame, but did not play college baseball there. He played college football at Wittenberg University before signing his first minor league contract in 1906. In September 1908, he joined the Reds for the first time and became the team's regular left fielder in 1909.

The switch-hitting Bescher played 5 seasons with Cincy, and established himself as a dangerous player on the basepaths with the Reds. He led the NL in stolen bases for four consecutive years from 1909 to 1912, and his 81 stolen bases in 1911 was the most in the 20th century for an NL player until 1962.

Outside of stolen bases, he was the NL leader in runs in 1912, and was the NL leader in walks in 1913. Also in 1912, he hit a career-best .282 and finished 5th in voting for the Chalmers Award, a forerunner to the modern MVP award.

He played for the New York Giants in 1914, after being traded there in exchange for Buck Herzog, and hit .270 in his lone year in the Big Apple. Three seasons with the St. Louis Cardinals followed, which ended after he was traded to the minor league Milwaukee Brewers, the trade coming at a time before minor league teams were affiliated with Major League clubs.

Bescher eventually returned to the majors in 1918 to play 25 games for the Cleveland Indians to end his big league career, although he continued to play in the minor leagues into his 40s.

In 1228 games over 11 seasons, Bescher posted a .258 batting average (1171-for-4536) with 749 runs, 190 doubles, 74 triples, 28 home runs, 345 RBI, 428 stolen bases and 619 bases on balls. He finished his career with a .960 fielding percentage playing at all three outfield positions.

He settled back down in London, Ohio after his Major League career to run a local lodge. He later died at the age of 58 in a car accident after being hit by an oncoming train.

== See also ==
- List of Major League Baseball annual runs scored leaders
- List of Major League Baseball annual stolen base leaders
- List of Major League Baseball career stolen bases leaders
- Major League Baseball titles leaders
