= Ginger Beaumont =

American baseball player (1876–1956)

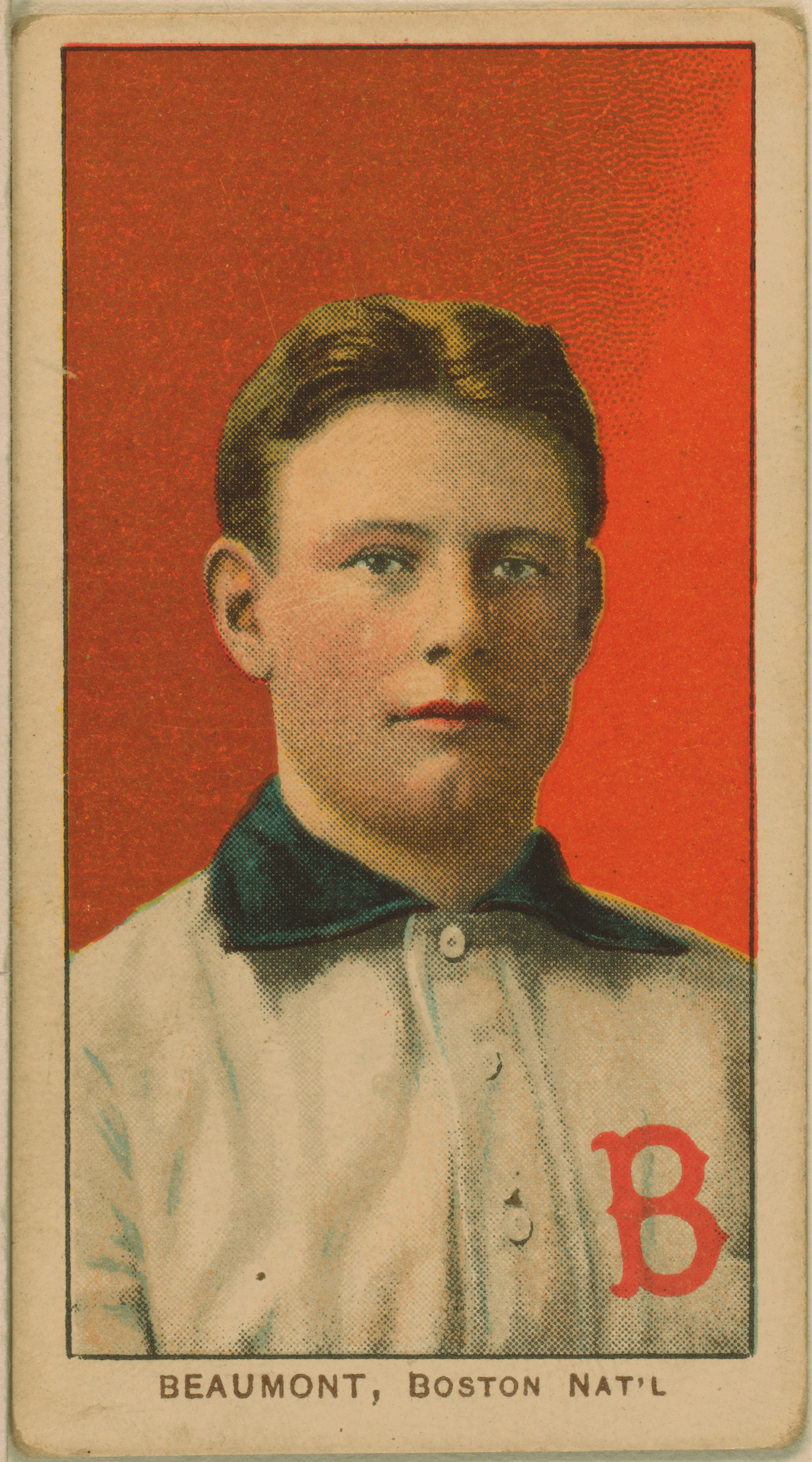
- Center fielder
- Born: July 23, 1876; Rochester, Wisconsin, U.S.
- Died: April 10, 1956 (aged 79); Burlington, Wisconsin, U.S.
- Batted: Left Threw: Right

MLB debut
- April 21, 1899, for the Pittsburgh Pirates

Last MLB appearance
- October 15, 1910, for the Chicago Cubs

MLB statistics
- Batting average: .311
- Home runs: 39
- Runs batted in: 617
- Stats at Baseball Reference

Teams
- Pittsburgh Pirates (1899–1906); Boston Doves (1907–1909); Chicago Cubs (1910)

Career highlights and awards
- NL batting champion (1902)

Clarence Howeth "Ginger" Beaumont (July 23, 1876 – April 10, 1956) was an American center fielder in Major League Baseball who spent most of his career with the Pittsburgh Pirates (1899–1906) and Boston Braves (1907–1909).

== Biography ==
Beaumont was born in Rochester, Wisconsin, and attended Beloit College. During the years 1900–1904 – with the Pirates winning pennants from 1901–1903 – Beaumont led the National League in hits three times, scored 100 runs four times, leading the league once, and also captured the 1902 batting championship with a .357 mark. As the Pirates' regular leadoff hitter, he was the first player ever to bat in a World Series game.

Nicknamed "Ginger" for his thick red hair, he used his excellent speed to great advantage; on the day before his 23rd birthday in his rookie season, he had six infield singles and became the first player to score six runs in a game. He was also the first player in major league history to lead his league in hits three consecutive years, which has been accomplished by only five others; he led the NL in hits a fourth time with the 1907 Braves. Often bothered by leg injuries, he joined the Chicago Cubs for the 1910 season, and made pinch-hitting appearances in the first three games of the 1910 World Series before leaving the major leagues with a .311 career batting average and on-base average of .362. He played one more season in the minor leagues before retiring to his Honey Creek, Wisconsin farm. He was one of the first inductees to the Wisconsin Athletic Hall of Fame in 1951. Beaumont suffered two strokes in his seventies, and died at age 79 in Burlington, Wisconsin.

Beaumont has a baseball field named after him in his hometown of Burlington. His name also represents part of the Burlington Little League organization. In July 2015, a monument to Beaumont was dedicated at Beaumont Field.

== See also ==
- List of Major League Baseball career stolen bases leaders
- List of Major League Baseball batting champions
- List of Major League Baseball annual runs scored leaders
- Major League Baseball titles leaders
- List of Major League Baseball single-game hits leaders
