= List of Major League Baseball annual runs scored leaders =

Major League Baseball recognizes runs scored leaders in the American League and National League each season. In baseball, a run is scored when a player advances safely around first, second and third base and returns safely to home plate, touching the bases in that order, before three outs are recorded. A player may score by hitting a home run or by any combination of plays that puts him safely "on base" (that is, on first, second, or third) as a runner and subsequently brings him home. The object of the game is for a team to score more runs than its opponent.

In baseball statistics, a player who advances around all the bases to score is credited with a run (R), sometimes referred to as a "run scored." While runs scored is considered an important individual batting statistic, it is regarded as less significant than runs batted in (RBIs)—superiority in the latter, for instance, is one of the elements of the exceptional batting achievement known as the Triple Crown. Both individual runs scored and runs batted in are heavily context-dependent; for a more sophisticated assessment of a player's contribution toward producing runs for his team, see runs created.

== American League ==
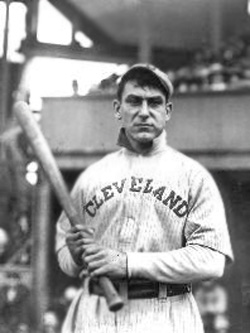
Nap Lajoie was the first American League runs scored champion, scoring 145 runs in the 1901 season.

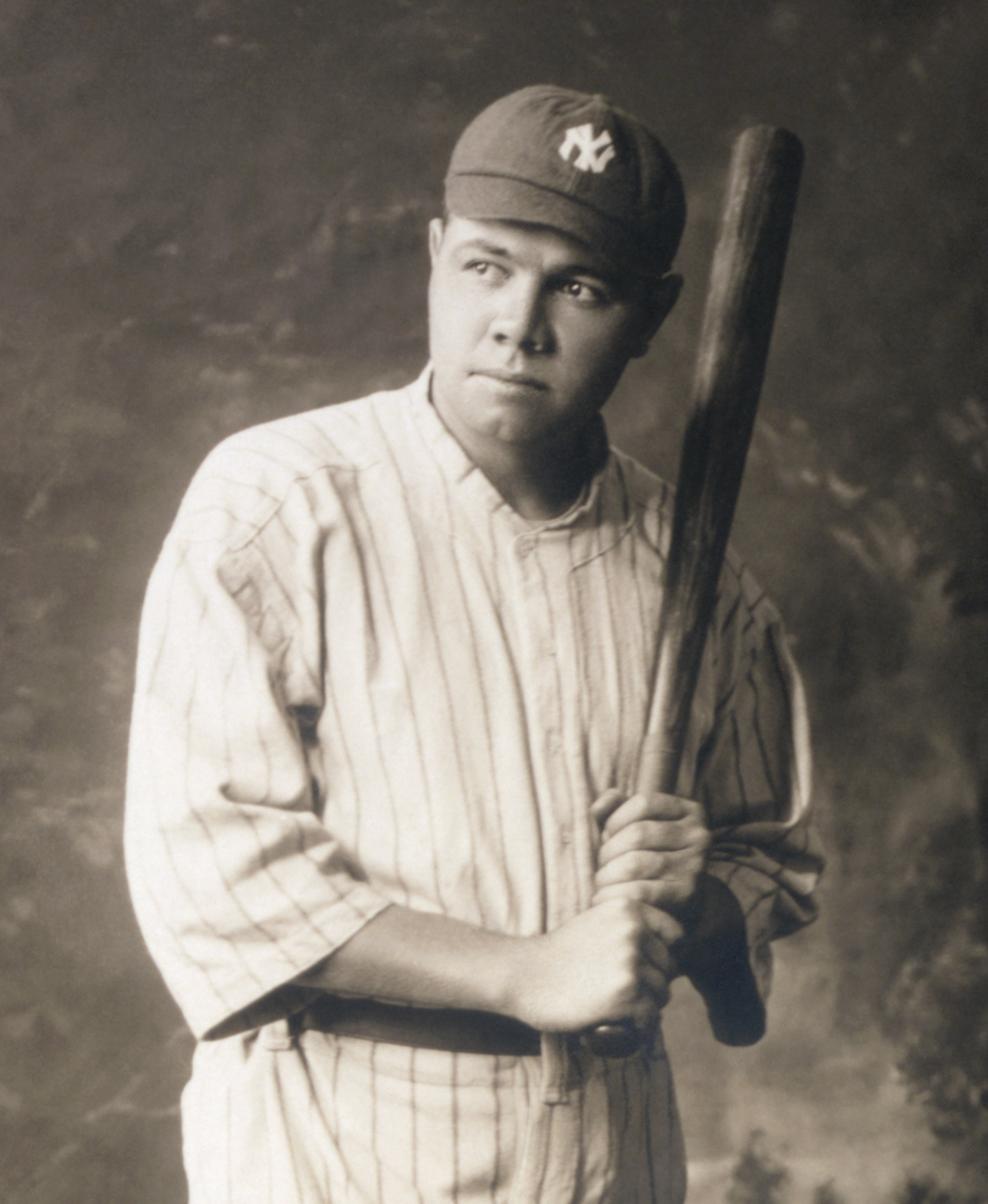
Babe Ruth was the American League runs scored leader a record seven times.

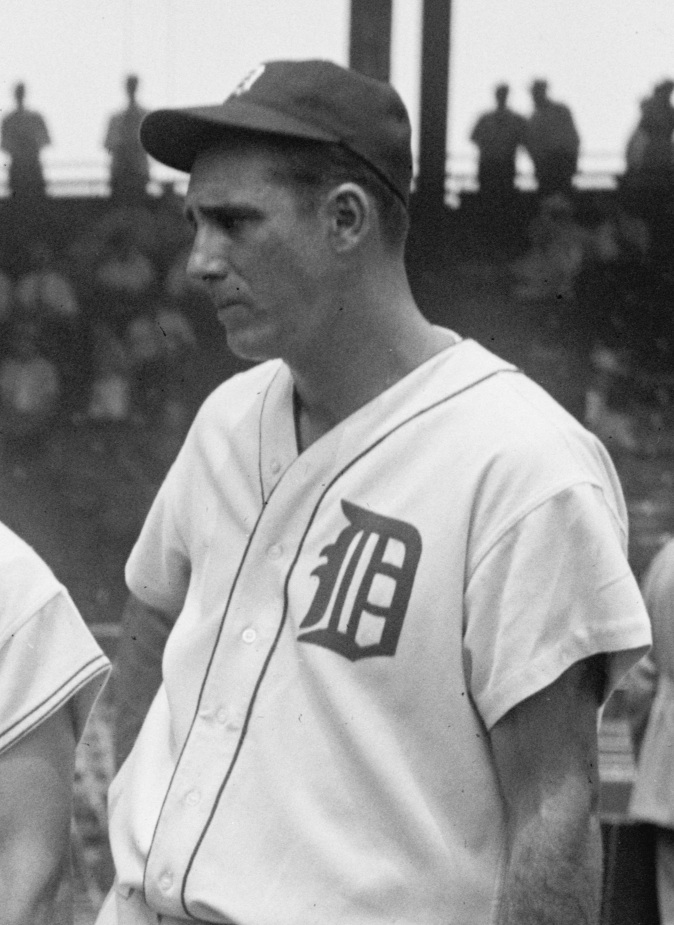
Hank Greenberg was a Hall of Famer and two-time MVP.

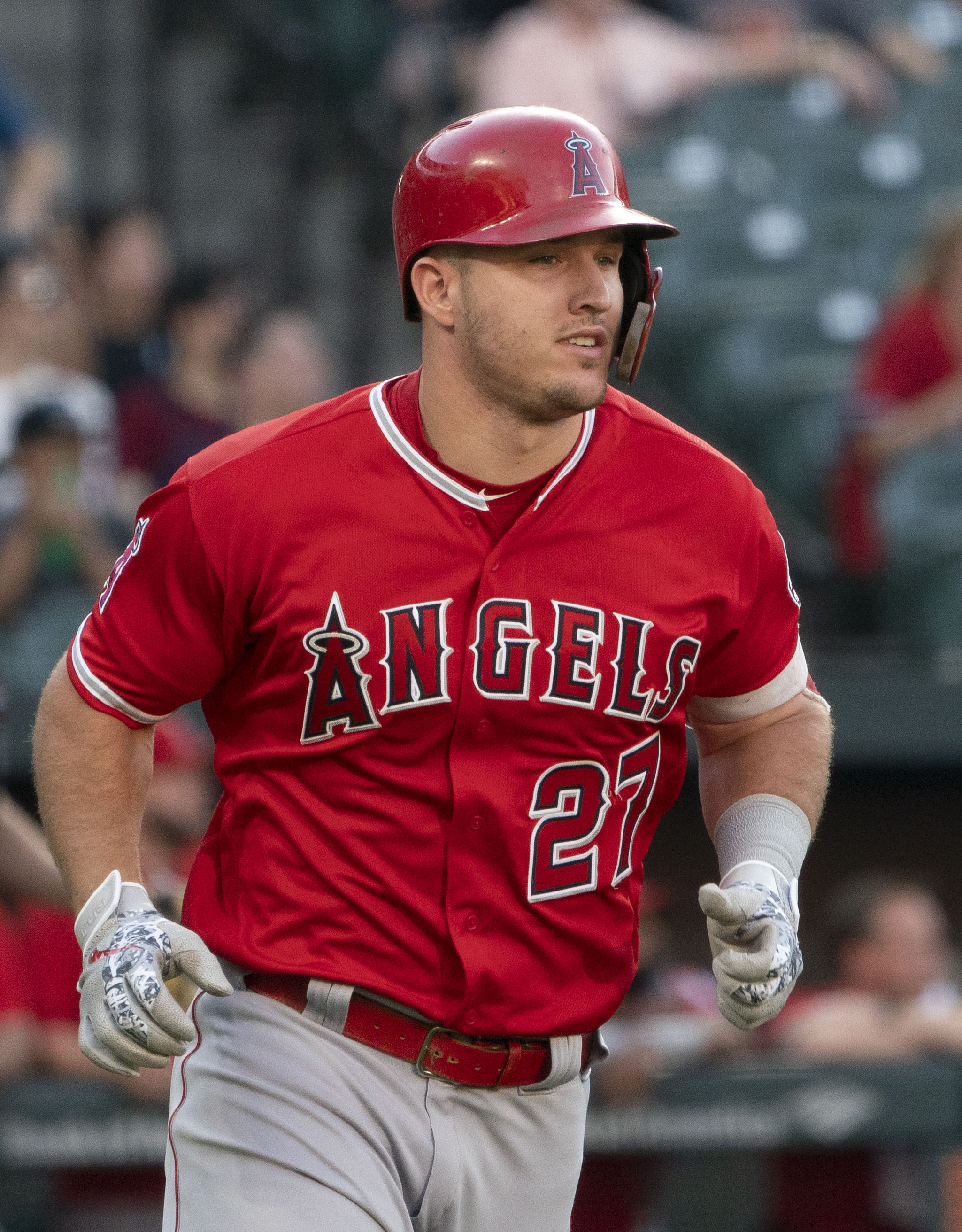
Mike Trout has led the American League in runs scored four times – the most of any player in the 21st century.

Year	Player	Team(s)	Runs
1901	Nap Lajoie	Philadelphia Athletics	145
1902	Dave Fultz; Topsy Hartsel	Philadelphia Athletics	109
1903	Patsy Dougherty	Boston Americans	107
1904	Patsy Dougherty	Boston Americans; New York Highlanders	113
1905	Harry Davis	Philadelphia Athletics	93
1906	Elmer Flick	Cleveland Naps	98
1907	Sam Crawford	Detroit Tigers	102
1908	Matty McIntyre	Detroit Tigers	105
1909	Ty Cobb	Detroit Tigers	116
1910	Ty Cobb	Detroit Tigers	116
1911	Ty Cobb	Detroit Tigers	147
1912	Eddie Collins	Philadelphia Athletics	137
1913	Eddie Collins	Philadelphia Athletics	125
1914	Eddie Collins	Philadelphia Athletics	122
1915	Ty Cobb	Detroit Tigers	144
1916	Ty Cobb	Detroit Tigers	113
1917	Donie Bush	Detroit Tigers	112
1918	Ray Chapman	Cleveland Indians	84
1919	Babe Ruth	Boston Red Sox	103
1920	Babe Ruth	New York Yankees	158
1921	Babe Ruth	New York Yankees	177
1922	George Sisler	St. Louis Browns	134
1923	Babe Ruth	New York Yankees	151
1924	Babe Ruth	New York Yankees	143
1925	Johnny Mostil	Chicago White Sox	135
1926	Babe Ruth	New York Yankees	139
1927	Babe Ruth	New York Yankees	158
1928	Babe Ruth	New York Yankees	163
1929	Charlie Gehringer	Detroit Tigers	131
1930	Al Simmons	Philadelphia Athletics	152
1931	Lou Gehrig	New York Yankees	163
1932	Jimmie Foxx	Philadelphia Athletics	151
1933	Lou Gehrig	New York Yankees	138
1934	Charlie Gehringer	Detroit Tigers	134
1935	Lou Gehrig	New York Yankees	125
1936	Lou Gehrig	New York Yankees	167
1937	Joe DiMaggio	New York Yankees	151
1938	Hank Greenberg	Detroit Tigers	144
1939	Red Rolfe	New York Yankees	139
1940	Ted Williams	Boston Red Sox	134
1941	Ted Williams	Boston Red Sox	135
1942	Ted Williams	Boston Red Sox	141
1943	George Case	Washington Senators	102
1944	Snuffy Stirnweiss	New York Yankees	125
1945	Snuffy Stirnweiss	New York Yankees	107
1946	Ted Williams	Boston Red Sox	142
1947	Ted Williams	Boston Red Sox	125
1948	Tommy Henrich	New York Yankees	138
1949	Ted Williams	Boston Red Sox	150
1950	Dom DiMaggio	Boston Red Sox	131
1951	Dom DiMaggio	Boston Red Sox	113
1952	Larry Doby	Cleveland Indians	104
1953	Al Rosen	Cleveland Indians	115
1954	Mickey Mantle	New York Yankees	129
1955	Al Smith	Cleveland Indians	123
1956	Mickey Mantle	New York Yankees	132
1957	Mickey Mantle	New York Yankees	121
1958	Mickey Mantle	New York Yankees	127
1959	Eddie Yost	Detroit Tigers	115
1960	Mickey Mantle	New York Yankees	119
1961	Roger Maris	New York Yankees	132
1962	Albie Pearson	Los Angeles Angels	115
1963	Bob Allison	Minnesota Twins	99
1964	Tony Oliva	Minnesota Twins	109
1965	Zoilo Versalles	Minnesota Twins	126
1966	Frank Robinson	Baltimore Orioles	122
1967	Carl Yastrzemski	Boston Red Sox	112
1968	Dick McAuliffe	Detroit Tigers	95
1969	Reggie Jackson	Oakland Athletics	123
1970	Carl Yastrzemski	Boston Red Sox	125
1971	Don Buford	Baltimore Orioles	99
1972	Bobby Murcer	New York Yankees	102
1973	Reggie Jackson	Oakland Athletics	99
1974	Carl Yastrzemski	Boston Red Sox	93
1975	Fred Lynn	Boston Red Sox	103
1976	Roy White	New York Yankees	104
1977	Rod Carew	Minnesota Twins	128
1978	Ron LeFlore	Detroit Tigers	126
1979	Don Baylor	California Angels	120
1980	Willie Wilson	Kansas City Royals	133
1981	Rickey Henderson	Oakland Athletics	89
1982	Paul Molitor	Milwaukee Brewers	136
1983	Cal Ripken Jr.	Baltimore Orioles	121
1984	Dwight Evans	Boston Red Sox	121
1985	Rickey Henderson	New York Yankees	146
1986	Rickey Henderson	New York Yankees	130
1987	Paul Molitor	Milwaukee Brewers	114
1988	Wade Boggs	Boston Red Sox	128
1989	Wade Boggs; Rickey Henderson	Boston Red Sox; New York/Oakland	113
1990	Rickey Henderson	Oakland Athletics	119
1991	Paul Molitor	Milwaukee Brewers	133
1992	Tony Phillips	Detroit Tigers	114
1993	Rafael Palmeiro	Texas Rangers	124
1994	Frank Thomas	Chicago White Sox	106
1995	Albert Belle; Edgar Martínez	Cleveland Indians; Seattle Mariners	121
1996	Alex Rodriguez	Seattle Mariners	141
1997	Ken Griffey Jr.	Seattle Mariners	125
1998	Derek Jeter	New York Yankees	127
1999	Roberto Alomar	Cleveland Indians	138
2000	Johnny Damon	Kansas City Royals	136
2001	Alex Rodriguez	Texas Rangers	133
2002	Alfonso Soriano	New York Yankees	128
2003	Alex Rodriguez	Texas Rangers	124
2004	Vladimir Guerrero	Anaheim Angels	124
2005	Alex Rodriguez	New York Yankees	124
2006	Grady Sizemore	Cleveland Indians	134
2007	Alex Rodriguez	New York Yankees	143
2008	Dustin Pedroia	Boston Red Sox	118
2009	Dustin Pedroia	Boston Red Sox	115
2010	Mark Teixeira	New York Yankees	113
2011	Curtis Granderson	New York Yankees	136
2012	Mike Trout	Los Angeles Angels of Anaheim	129
2013	Mike Trout	Los Angeles Angels of Anaheim	109
2014	Mike Trout	Los Angeles Angels of Anaheim	115
2015	Josh Donaldson	Toronto Blue Jays	122
2016	Mike Trout	Los Angeles Angels of Anaheim	123
2017	Aaron Judge	New York Yankees	128
2018	Mookie Betts; Francisco Lindor	Boston Red Sox; Cleveland Indians	129
2019	Mookie Betts	Boston Red Sox	135
2020	Tim Anderson; José Ramírez	Chicago White Sox; Cleveland Indians	45
2021	Vladimir Guerrero Jr.	Toronto Blue Jays	123
2022	Aaron Judge	New York Yankees	133
2023	Marcus Semien	Texas Rangers	122
2024	Juan Soto	New York Yankees	128
2025	Aaron Judge	New York Yankees	137
2026	Randy Arozarena	Seattle Mariners	113

== National League ==
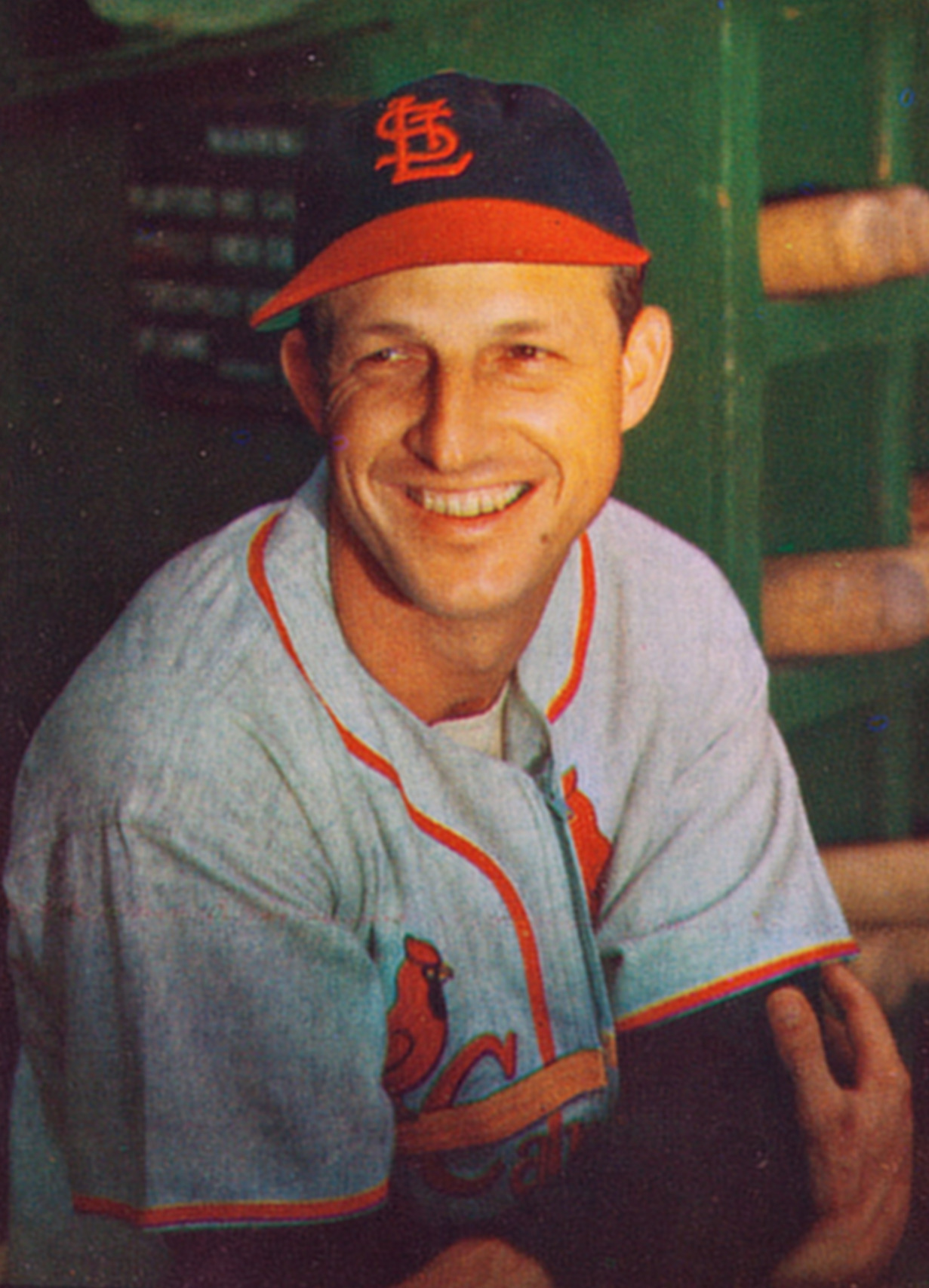
Stan Musial led the National League in runs scored five times.

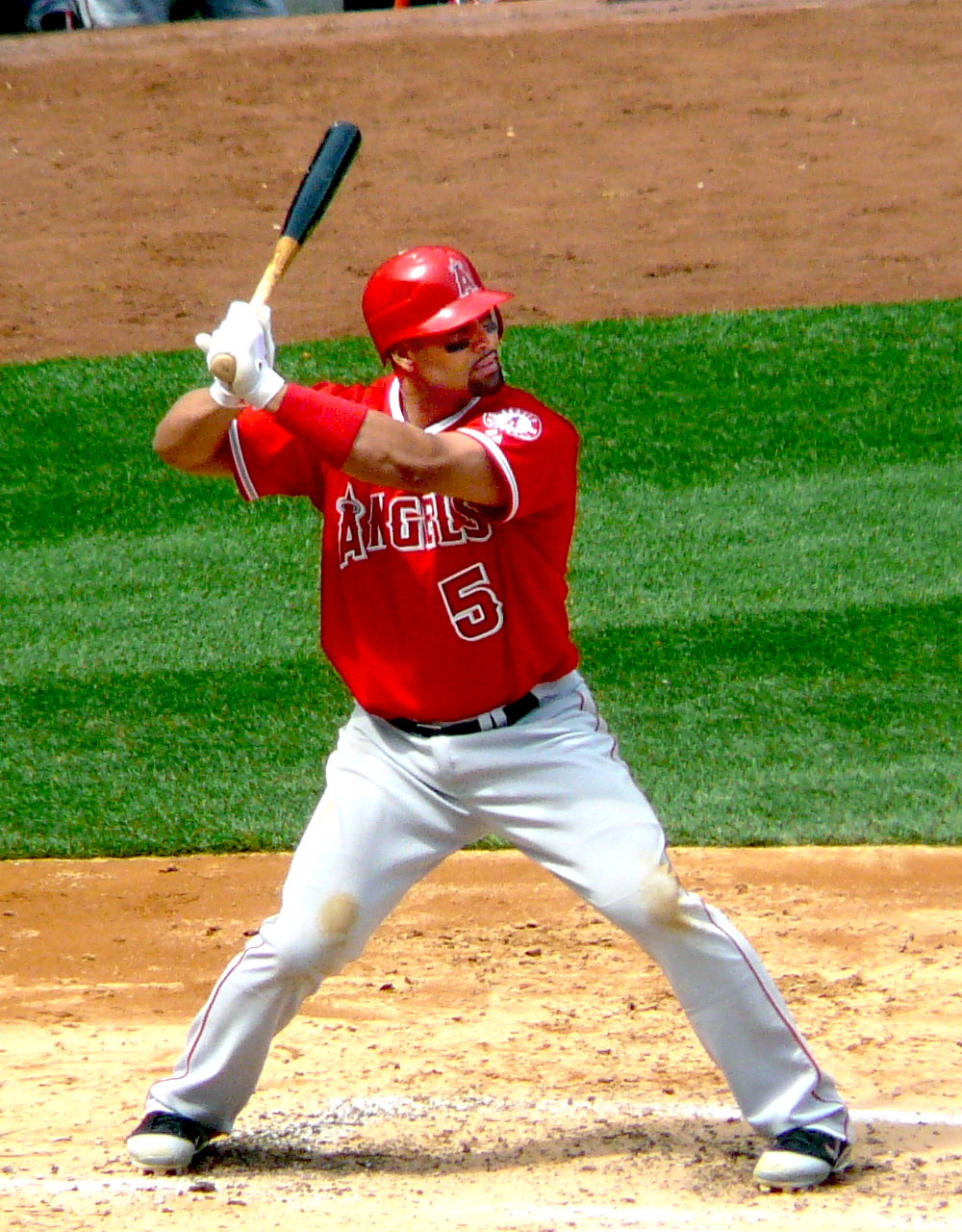
Albert Pujols has led the National League in runs scored five times.

Year	Player	Team(s)	Runs
1876	Ross Barnes	Chicago White Stockings	126
1877	Jim O'Rourke	Boston Red Caps	68
1878	Dick Higham	Providence Grays	60
1879	Charley Jones	Boston Red Caps	85
1880	Abner Dalrymple	Chicago White Stockings	91
1881	George Gore	Chicago White Stockings	86
1882	George Gore	Chicago White Stockings	99
1883	Joe Hornung	Boston Beaneaters	107
1884	King Kelly	Chicago White Stockings	120
1885	King Kelly	Chicago White Stockings	124
1886	King Kelly	Chicago White Stockings	155
1887	Dan Brouthers	Detroit Wolverines	153
1888	Dan Brouthers	Detroit Wolverines	118
1889	Mike Tiernan	New York Giants	147
1890	Hub Collins	Brooklyn Bridegrooms	148
1891	Billy Hamilton	Philadelphia Phillies	141
1892	Cupid Childs	Cleveland Spiders	136
1893	Herman Long	Boston Beaneaters	149
1894	Billy Hamilton	Philadelphia Phillies	198
1895	Billy Hamilton	Philadelphia Phillies	166
1896	Jesse Burkett	Cleveland Spiders	160
1897	Billy Hamilton	Boston Beaneaters	152
1898	John McGraw	Baltimore Orioles	143
1899	Willie Keeler; John McGraw	Brooklyn Superbas; Baltimore Orioles	140
1900	Roy Thomas	Philadelphia Phillies	132
1901	Jesse Burkett	St. Louis Cardinals	142
1902	Honus Wagner	Pittsburgh Pirates	105
1903	Ginger Beaumont	Pittsburgh Pirates	137
1904	George Browne	New York Giants	99
1905	Mike Donlin	New York Giants	124
1906	Frank Chance; Honus Wagner	Chicago Cubs; Pittsburgh Pirates	103
1907	Spike Shannon	New York Giants	104
1908	Fred Tenney	New York Giants	101
1909	Tommy Leach	Pittsburgh Pirates	126
1910	Sherry Magee	Philadelphia Phillies	110
1911	Jimmy Sheckard	Chicago Cubs	121
1912	Bob Bescher	Cincinnati Reds	120
1913	Max Carey; Tommy Leach	Pittsburgh Pirates; Chicago Cubs	99
1914	George Burns	New York Giants	100
1915	Gavvy Cravath	Philadelphia Phillies	89
1916	George Burns	New York Giants	105
1917	George Burns	New York Giants	103
1918	Heinie Groh	Cincinnati Reds	86
1919	George Burns	New York Giants	86
1920	George Burns	New York Giants	115
1921	Rogers Hornsby	St. Louis Cardinals	131
1922	Rogers Hornsby	St. Louis Cardinals	141
1923	Ross Youngs	New York Giants	121
1924	Frankie Frisch; Rogers Hornsby	New York Giants; St. Louis Cardinals	121
1925	Kiki Cuyler	Pittsburgh Pirates	144
1926	Kiki Cuyler	Pittsburgh Pirates	113
1927	Rogers Hornsby; Lloyd Waner	New York Giants; Pittsburgh Pirates	133
1928	Paul Waner	Pittsburgh Pirates	142
1929	Rogers Hornsby	Chicago Cubs	156
1930	Chuck Klein	Philadelphia Phillies	158
1931	Chuck Klein; Bill Terry	Philadelphia Phillies; New York Giants	121
1932	Chuck Klein	Philadelphia Phillies	152
1933	Pepper Martin	St. Louis Cardinals	122
1934	Paul Waner	Pittsburgh Pirates	122
1935	Augie Galan	Chicago Cubs	133
1936	Arky Vaughan	Pittsburgh Pirates	122
1937	Joe Medwick	St. Louis Cardinals	111
1938	Mel Ott	New York Giants	116
1939	Billy Werber	Cincinnati Reds	115
1940	Arky Vaughan	Pittsburgh Pirates	113
1941	Pete Reiser	Brooklyn Dodgers	117
1942	Mel Ott	New York Giants	118
1943	Arky Vaughan	Brooklyn Dodgers	112
1944	Bill Nicholson	Chicago Cubs	116
1945	Eddie Stanky	Brooklyn Dodgers	128
1946	Stan Musial	St. Louis Cardinals	124
1947	Johnny Mize	New York Giants	137
1948	Stan Musial	St. Louis Cardinals	135
1949	Pee Wee Reese	Brooklyn Dodgers	132
1950	Earl Torgeson	Boston Braves	120
1951	Ralph Kiner; Stan Musial	Pittsburgh Pirates; St. Louis Cardinals	124
1952	Solly Hemus; Stan Musial	St. Louis Cardinals	105
1953	Duke Snider	Brooklyn Dodgers	132
1954	Stan Musial; Duke Snider	St. Louis Cardinals; Brooklyn Dodgers	120
1955	Duke Snider	Brooklyn Dodgers	126
1956	Frank Robinson	Cincinnati Reds	122
1957	Hank Aaron	Milwaukee Braves	118
1958	Willie Mays	San Francisco Giants	121
1959	Vada Pinson	Cincinnati Reds	131
1960	Bill Bruton	Milwaukee Braves	112
1961	Willie Mays	San Francisco Giants	129
1962	Frank Robinson	Cincinnati Reds	134
1963	Hank Aaron	Milwaukee Braves	121
1964	Dick Allen	Philadelphia Phillies	125
1965	Tommy Harper	Cincinnati Reds	126
1966	Felipe Alou	Atlanta Braves	122
1967	Hank Aaron; Lou Brock	Atlanta Braves; St. Louis Cardinals	113
1968	Glenn Beckert	Chicago Cubs	98
1969	Bobby Bonds; Pete Rose	San Francisco Giants; Cincinnati Reds	120
1970	Billy Williams	Chicago Cubs	137
1971	Lou Brock	St. Louis Cardinals	126
1972	Joe Morgan	Cincinnati Reds	122
1973	Bobby Bonds	San Francisco Giants	131
1974	Pete Rose	Cincinnati Reds	110
1975	Pete Rose	Cincinnati Reds	112
1976	Pete Rose	Cincinnati Reds	130
1977	George Foster	Cincinnati Reds	124
1978	Iván DeJesús	Chicago Cubs	104
1979	Keith Hernandez	St. Louis Cardinals	116
1980	Keith Hernandez	St. Louis Cardinals	111
1981	Mike Schmidt	Philadelphia Phillies	78
1982	Lonnie Smith	St. Louis Cardinals	120
1983	Tim Raines	Montreal Expos	133
1984	Ryne Sandberg	Chicago Cubs	114
1985	Dale Murphy	Atlanta Braves	118
1986	Tony Gwynn; Von Hayes	San Diego Padres; Philadelphia Phillies	107
1987	Tim Raines	Montreal Expos	123
1988	Brett Butler	San Francisco Giants	109
1989	Will Clark; Howard Johnson; Ryne Sandberg	San Francisco Giants; New York Mets; Chicago Cubs	104
1990	Ryne Sandberg	Chicago Cubs	116
1991	Brett Butler	Los Angeles Dodgers	112
1992	Barry Bonds	Pittsburgh Pirates	109
1993	Lenny Dykstra	Philadelphia Phillies	143
1994	Jeff Bagwell	Houston Astros	104
1995	Craig Biggio	Houston Astros	123
1996	Ellis Burks	Colorado Rockies	142
1997	Craig Biggio	Houston Astros	146
1998	Sammy Sosa	Chicago Cubs	134
1999	Jeff Bagwell	Houston Astros	143
2000	Jeff Bagwell	Houston Astros	152
2001	Sammy Sosa	Chicago Cubs	146
2002	Sammy Sosa	Chicago Cubs	122
2003	Albert Pujols	St. Louis Cardinals	137
2004	Albert Pujols	St. Louis Cardinals	133
2005	Albert Pujols	St. Louis Cardinals	129
2006	Chase Utley	Philadelphia Phillies	131
2007	Jimmy Rollins	Philadelphia Phillies	139
2008	Hanley Ramírez	Florida Marlins	125
2009	Albert Pujols	St. Louis Cardinals	124
2010	Albert Pujols	St. Louis Cardinals	115
2011	Matt Kemp	Los Angeles Dodgers	115
2012	Ryan Braun	Milwaukee Brewers	108
2013	Matt Carpenter	St. Louis Cardinals	126
2014	Anthony Rendon	Washington Nationals	111
2015	Bryce Harper	Washington Nationals	118
2016	Kris Bryant	Chicago Cubs	121
2017	Charlie Blackmon	Colorado Rockies	137
2018	Charlie Blackmon	Colorado Rockies	119
2019	Ronald Acuña Jr.	Atlanta Braves	127
2020	Freddie Freeman	Atlanta Braves	51
2021	Freddie Freeman	Atlanta Braves	120
2022	Mookie Betts; Freddie Freeman	Los Angeles Dodgers; Los Angeles Dodgers	117
2023	Ronald Acuña Jr.	Atlanta Braves	149
2024	Shohei Ohtani	Los Angeles Dodgers	134
2025	Shohei Ohtani	Los Angeles Dodgers	146
2026	Pete Crow-Armstrong	Chicago Cubs	119

== American Association ==
Year	Player	Team(s)	Runs
1882	Ed Swartwood	Pittsburgh Alleghenys	86
1883	Harry Stovey	Philadelphia Athletics	110
1884	Harry Stovey	Philadelphia Athletics	124
1885	Harry Stovey	Philadelphia Athletics	130
1886	Arlie Latham	St. Louis Browns	152
1887	Tip O'Neill	St. Louis Browns	167
1888	George Pinkney	Brooklyn Bridegrooms	134
1889	Mike Griffin; Harry Stovey	Baltimore Orioles; Philadelphia Athletics	152
1890	Jim McTamany	Columbus Solons	140
1891	Tom Brown	Boston Reds	177

== Federal League ==
Year	Player	Team(s)	Runs
1914	Benny Kauff	Indianapolis Hoosiers	120
1915	Babe Borton	St. Louis Terriers	97

== Player's League ==
Year	Player	Team(s)	Runs
1890	Hugh Duffy	Chicago Pirates	161

== Union Association ==
Year	Player	Team(s)	Runs
1884	Fred Dunlap	St. Louis Maroons	160

== National Association ==
Year	Player	Team(s)	Runs
1871	Ross Barnes	Boston Red Stockings	66
1872	Dave Eggler	New York Mutuals	94
1873	Ross Barnes	Boston Red Stockings	125
1874	Cal McVey	Boston Red Stockings	91
1875	Ross Barnes	Boston Red Stockings	115

== Negro Major Leagues ==
=== Negro National League I ===
Year	Leader	Runs scored	Team	Runner-up	Runs scored	Ref
1920	Hurley McNair	141	Kansas City Monarchs	Oscar Charleston	138	
1921	Oscar Charleston	90	St. Louis Giants	George Carr	85	
1922	Oscar Charleston	92	Indianapolis ABCs	Hurley McNair	78	
1923	Heavy Johnson	91	Kansas City Monarchs	Hurley McNair	82	
1924	Dave Malarcher	70	Chicago American Giants	Jelly Gardner	66	
1925	Cool Papa Bell	93	St. Louis Stars	Turkey Stearnes	91	
1926	Cool Papa Bell	107	St. Louis Stars	Dewey Creacy	95	
1927	Willie Wells	91	St. Louis Stars	Cool Papa Bell	89	
1928	Willie Wells	82	St. Louis Stars	Cool Papa Bell; Turkey Stearnes	81	
1929	Willie Wells	109	Chicago American Giants / St. Louis Stars	Cool Papa Bell	98	
1930	Willie Wells	113	St. Louis Stars	Cool Papa Bell	107	
1931	Cool Papa Bell	47	St. Louis Stars	Wade Johnston	37	

=== Eastern Colored League ===
Year	Leader	Runs scored	Team	Runner-up	Runs scored	Ref
1923	Otto Briggs	51	Hilldale Club	Frank Warfield	46	
1924	Oscar Charleston	67	Harrisburg Giants	Fats Jenkins	61	
1925	Oscar Charleston	97	Harrisburg Giants	Fats Jenkins	84	
1926	Frank Warfield	75	Hilldale Club	Otto Briggs	67	
1927	Dick Lundy	76	Atlantic City Bacharach Giants	Oscar Charleston	74	
1928	Chaney White	54	Atlantic City Bacharach Giants	Rap Dixon	53	
