= 2008 Major League Baseball season =

2008 MLB season
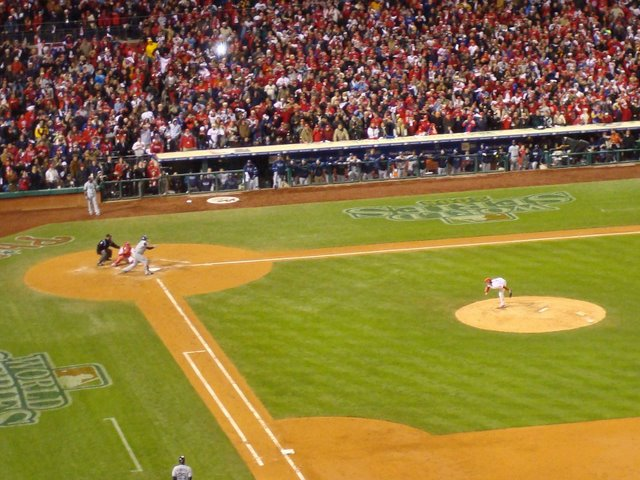
- Brad Lidge (bottom right) strikes out Eric Hinske to win the 2008 World Series for the Philadelphia Phillies.
- League: Major League Baseball
- Sport: Baseball
- Duration: March 25 – October 29, 2008
- Games: 162
- Teams: 30
- TV partner(s): Fox; TBS; ESPN

Draft
- Top draft pick: Tim Beckham
- Picked by: Tampa Bay Rays

Regular season
- Season MVP: AL: Dustin Pedroia (BOS); NL: Albert Pujols (STL)

Postseason
- AL champions: Tampa Bay Rays
- AL runners-up: Boston Red Sox
- NL champions: Philadelphia Phillies
- NL runners-up: Los Angeles Dodgers

World Series
- Champions: Philadelphia Phillies
- Runners-up: Tampa Bay Rays
- World Series MVP: Cole Hamels (PHI)

MLB seasons
- ← 2007 2009 →

Locations of AL teams for the 2008 MLB season
West Central East
Locations of NL teams for the 2008 MLB season
West Central East

The 2008 Major League Baseball season began on March 25, 2008, in Tokyo, Japan with the 2007 World Series champion Boston Red Sox defeating the Oakland Athletics at the Tokyo Dome 6–5 (in 10 innings) in the first game of a two-game series, and ended on September 30 with the host Chicago White Sox defeating the Minnesota Twins in a one-game playoff to win the AL Central. The Civil Rights Game, an exhibition, in Memphis, Tennessee, took place March 29 when the New York Mets beat the Chicago White Sox, 3–2.

The Tampa Bay Devil Rays shortened their name to Tampa Bay Rays.

The All-Star Game was played on July 15 at the Old Yankee Stadium in The Bronx, New York City, with the AL winning 4 to 3 in 15 innings. The Philadelphia Phillies won the World Series 4 games to 1 over the Tampa Bay Rays. This was Philadelphia's second championship, and also the first World Series appearance for the Rays.

== Regular season ==
=== American League ===
AL East
Team	W	L	Pct.	GB	Home	Road
^{(2)} Tampa Bay Rays	97	65	.599	—	57‍–‍24	40‍–‍41
^{(4)} Boston Red Sox	95	67	.586	2	56‍–‍25	39‍–‍42
New York Yankees	89	73	.549	8	48‍–‍33	41‍–‍40
Toronto Blue Jays	86	76	.531	11	47‍–‍34	39‍–‍42
Baltimore Orioles	68	93	.422	28½	37‍–‍43	31‍–‍50

AL Central
Team	W	L	Pct.	GB	Home	Road
^{(3)} Chicago White Sox	89	74	.546	—	54‍–‍28	35‍–‍46
Minnesota Twins	88	75	.540	1	53‍–‍28	35‍–‍47
Cleveland Indians	81	81	.500	7½	45‍–‍36	36‍–‍45
Kansas City Royals	75	87	.463	13½	38‍–‍43	37‍–‍44
Detroit Tigers	74	88	.457	14½	40‍–‍41	34‍–‍47

AL West
Team	W	L	Pct.	GB	Home	Road
^{(1)} Los Angeles Angels	100	62	.617	—	50‍–‍31	50‍–‍31
Texas Rangers	79	83	.488	21	40‍–‍41	39‍–‍42
Oakland Athletics	75	86	.466	24½	43‍–‍38	32‍–‍48
Seattle Mariners	61	101	.377	39	35‍–‍46	26‍–‍55

=== National League ===
NL East
Team	W	L	Pct.	GB	Home	Road
^{(2)} Philadelphia Phillies	92	70	.568	—	48‍–‍33	44‍–‍37
New York Mets	89	73	.549	3	48‍–‍33	41‍–‍40
Florida Marlins	84	77	.522	7½	45‍–‍36	39‍–‍41
Atlanta Braves	72	90	.444	20	43‍–‍38	29‍–‍52
Washington Nationals	59	102	.366	32½	34‍–‍46	25‍–‍56

NL Central
Team	W	L	Pct.	GB	Home	Road
^{(1)} Chicago Cubs	97	64	.602	—	55‍–‍26	42‍–‍38
^{(4)} Milwaukee Brewers	90	72	.556	7½	49‍–‍32	41‍–‍40
Houston Astros	86	75	.534	11	47‍–‍33	39‍–‍42
St. Louis Cardinals	86	76	.531	11½	46‍–‍35	40‍–‍41
Cincinnati Reds	74	88	.457	23½	43‍–‍38	31‍–‍50
Pittsburgh Pirates	67	95	.414	30½	39‍–‍42	28‍–‍53

NL West
Team	W	L	Pct.	GB	Home	Road
^{(3)} Los Angeles Dodgers	84	78	.519	—	48‍–‍33	36‍–‍45
Arizona Diamondbacks	82	80	.506	2	48‍–‍33	34‍–‍47
Colorado Rockies	74	88	.457	10	43‍–‍38	31‍–‍50
San Francisco Giants	72	90	.444	12	37‍–‍44	35‍–‍46
San Diego Padres	63	99	.389	21	35‍–‍46	28‍–‍53

- The Chicago White Sox defeated the Minnesota Twins in a one-game playoff to earn the AL Central division title.

== Postseason ==
=== Bracket ===
Division Series (ALDS, NLDS)
1	LA Angels	1
4	Boston	3
American League
2	Tampa Bay	3
3	Chicago White Sox	1
1	Chicago Cubs	0
3	LA Dodgers	3
National League
2	Philadelphia	3
4	Milwaukee	1

League Championship Series (NLCS, ALCS)
4	Boston	3
2	Tampa Bay	4
3	LA Dodgers	1
2	Philadelphia	4

World Series
AL2	Tampa Bay	1
NL2	Philadelphia	4

Note: Two teams in the same division could not meet in the division series.

== League leaders ==
=== American League ===
Batting leaders
Stat	Player	Total
AVG	Joe Mauer (MIN)	.328
OPS	Josh Hamilton (TEX)	1.114
HR	Miguel Cabrera (DET)	37
RBI	Josh Hamilton (TEX)	130
R	Dustin Pedroia (BOS)	118
H	Dustin Pedroia (BOS); Ichiro Suzuki (SEA)	213
SB	Jacoby Ellsbury (BOS)	50

Pitching leaders
Stat	Player	Total
W	Cliff Lee (CLE)	22
L	Justin Verlander (DET)	17
ERA	Cliff Lee (CLE)	2.54
K	A. J. Burnett (TOR)	231
IP	Roy Halladay (TOR)	246
SV	Francisco Rodríguez^{1} (LAA)	62
WHIP	Roy Halladay (TOR)	1.053

^{1} All-time single-season saves record

=== National League ===
Batting leaders
Stat	Player	Total
AVG	Chipper Jones (ATL)	.364
OPS	Albert Pujols (STL)	1.114
HR	Ryan Howard (PHI)	48
RBI	Ryan Howard (PHI)	146
R	Hanley Ramírez (FLA)	125
H	José Reyes (NYM)	204
SB	Willy Taveras (COL)	68

Pitching leaders
Stat	Player	Total
W	Brandon Webb (AZ)	22
L	Aaron Harang (CIN); Barry Zito (SF)	17
ERA	Johan Santana (NYM)	2.53
K	Tim Lincecum (SF)	265
IP	Johan Santana (NYM)	234.1
SV	José Valverde (HOU)	44
WHIP	Cole Hamels (PHI)	1.082

== Accomplishments ==
=== Career milestones ===
- Iván Rodríguez of the Detroit Tigers recorded his 2,500th hit April 9 against the Boston Red Sox.
- John Smoltz of the Atlanta Braves recorded his 3,000th strikeout against Felipe López of the Washington Nationals April 22.
- Kenny Rogers of the Detroit Tigers became the all-time career pickoff leader with 92. On May 9, Rogers picked off Wilson Betemit of the New York Yankees, passing Mark Langston.
- Greg Maddux of the San Diego Padres recorded his 350th career win against the Colorado Rockies on May 10.
- Brad Ausmus of the Houston Astros recorded his 1,500th hit on May 12 against the Giants. Along with his 101 stolen bases, he became 1 of 8 catchers in MLB history that have achieved at least 1,500 hits and 100 stolen bases.
- Omar Vizquel of the San Francisco Giants played his 2,584th game as a shortstop on May 25, breaking the record previously held by Luis Aparicio.
- Philadelphia Phillies left-handed pitcher Jamie Moyer became the sixth pitcher in Major League Baseball history to defeat all 30 teams on May 26 by defeating the Rockies 20–5.
- Manny Ramírez of the Boston Red Sox hit his 500th career home run off of Chad Bradford of the Baltimore Orioles on May 31. Ramírez became the 24th player to hit 500 career home runs. Ramírez was traded to the Los Angeles Dodgers in a three-way trade that also involved the Pittsburgh Pirates in July. Ramirez then recorded his 500th double, and became the first player to record 50 RBIs in the same season in both leagues.
- Randy Johnson of the Arizona Diamondbacks recorded his 4,673rd career strikeout when he struck-out Mike Cameron of the Milwaukee Brewers on June 3. With this strikeout, Johnson passed Roger Clemens for 2nd on the All-time Career Strikeout Leaders.
- Chipper Jones of the Atlanta Braves hits his 400th career home run on June 5 off of Ricky Nolasco of the Florida Marlins
- Ken Griffey Jr. of the Cincinnati Reds hit his 600th career home run on June 9, a two-run shot off Mark Hendrickson of the Florida Marlins, becoming only the sixth player to reach this plateau. On July 3, Griffey hit a home run off of Jason Bergmann that gave him 5,000 career total bases, becoming the 18th player to do so. Griffey, who was traded to the Chicago White Sox on July 31, hit his 610th career home run on September 23, passing former White Sox player Sammy Sosa for fifth on the all-time list. He's also hit his 500th double as a member of the South Siders.
- Albert Pujols of the St. Louis Cardinals hit his 300th career home run on July 4, a screaming line drive against the left field foul pole off the Chicago Cubs at Busch Stadium. Also in the season, he recorded his 1,500th hit. He also became the third player in Major League history to begin his career with eight straight 100-RBI seasons, joining Hall of Famers Al Simmons and Ted Williams.
- Carl Crawford of the Tampa Bay Rays stole his 300th career base on July 7 against the Kansas City Royals, making him only the ninth player in history to steal that many before age 27.
- Derek Jeter of the New York Yankees hit his 200th home run.
- Jonathan Papelbon of the Boston Red Sox recorded his 100th career save on July 13 against the Baltimore Orioles
- Grady Sizemore of the Cleveland Indians hits his 100th home run and stole his 100th base.
- Jeff Kent of the Los Angeles Dodgers passed 1500 RBI.
- Ichiro Suzuki broke the Seattle Mariners franchise record for stolen bases of 290 previously held by Julio Cruz. He also recorded his 3,000th hit when combining his records in MLB and Nippon Professional Baseball, Japan's major league.
- Mike Mussina of the New York Yankees recorded his first 20 win season at the age of 39, becoming the oldest player to do so for the first time.

=== Team milestones ===
- The Philadelphia Phillies notched two 20-run games in one season for their first time since 1900.
- The Colorado Rockies and San Diego Padres played a game that took 22 innings to complete on April 17 at Petco Park, lasting 6 hours, 16 minutes, marking the longest game (in terms of innings played) in the history of both franchises. The Rockies won 2–1. The Padres would later play another long home game on May 25, this time an 18-inning affair against the Cincinnati Reds. The game, which ran five hours, 57 minutes was the longest game (time wise) in the Reds' history.
- The Chicago Cubs won their 10,000th National League game on April 23, defeating the Colorado Rockies 7–6 in 10 innings. The Cubs also won 77 games during their time in the National Association (1871–1875), a predecessor of the National League, but those wins are not counted by Major League Baseball. The San Francisco Giants are the only other professional sports team with more than 10,000 wins, having reached that milestone in 2005.
- The St. Louis Cardinals achieved a franchise record of 18 wins for the month of April.
- The Florida Marlins had their best start in franchise history, with a record of 22–14.
- The Tampa Bay Rays had their best start in franchise history, with a record of 55–32, 23 games over .500. Along with their best start, they are the first team since 1900 with the worst record in baseball the previous year to have the best record on July 4. On August 10, the Rays earned their 71st victory in an 11–4 win over the Seattle Mariners. This bests the franchise's previous best of 70 wins in 2004. They would ultimately win 97 games by the end of the regular season, 27 more than their previous record. The Rays reached the postseason for the first time in the Franchise's history.
- On August 12, the Boston Red Sox scored ten runs in the first inning, but had to come from behind to beat the Texas Rangers, who had overcome two ten-run deficits in this game, by a score of 19–17. On September 8, the Red Sox set a Major League Baseball record for the longest consecutive streak of home-park sellout games with their 456th consecutive sellout. The previous record had been held by the Cleveland Indians, who sold out 455 games between June 12, 1995 and April 2, 2001. The streak began on May 15, 2003, in a 14–3 blowout against the Texas Rangers. The Red Sox are only the fourth team to sell out every home game of an entire season, the others being the 1996 Colorado Rockies and the 2000 San Francisco Giants.
- On September 10, the Los Angeles Angels of Anaheim clinched the American League West division title, becoming the earliest team to clinch that division in its history. On September 28, the Angels won their 100th game of the season, beating their previous record of 99 back in 2002.
- The Seattle Mariners lost 100 games for the first time since the 1983 season, a span of 25 years. They are also the first team to lose 100 games with a US $100 million payroll. Meanwhile, they had company as the Washington Nationals also registered 100 losses, marking the first time since the 1976 season, when the franchise was known as the Montreal Expos, that they would reach this dubious mark.
- The Milwaukee Brewers secured their first playoff berth since 1982 by winning the NL Wild Card berth.
- The Chicago White Sox broke the club record for grand slams in a single season with 12. The White Sox also became the first team ever to win their last three games of the season against three different teams: 5–1 vs. Cleveland Indians in the scheduled season ending game on September 28, 8–2 vs Detroit Tigers in a make-up game on September 29 from a rainout 16 days earlier, and a one-game playoff on September 30, 1–0 vs Minnesota Twins respectively.
- The Florida Marlins are the first team in MLB history to have all four infielders hit 25 or more home runs (Jorge Cantú, 29, Mike Jacobs/Dan Uggla, 32, and Hanley Ramírez, 33)

=== Retirements ===
==== Players ====
- Todd Jones on September 23 in an article published in The Sporting News, of which he is a columnist, announced he would retire following the season's completion. He was twelve appearances shy of reaching the 1,000 game plateau.
- Salomón Torres announced in November that he would not return for the 2009 MLB season.
- Mike Mussina on November 20, 2008, officially announced his retirement. Mussina is the first pitcher to call it quits following a 20-victory season since Hall of Famer Sandy Koufax in 1966.
- Greg Maddux announced his retirement on December 8.
- Jeff Kent announced his retirement on January 22.
- Sean Casey decided to retire and become an analyst with the MLB Network

==== Management ====
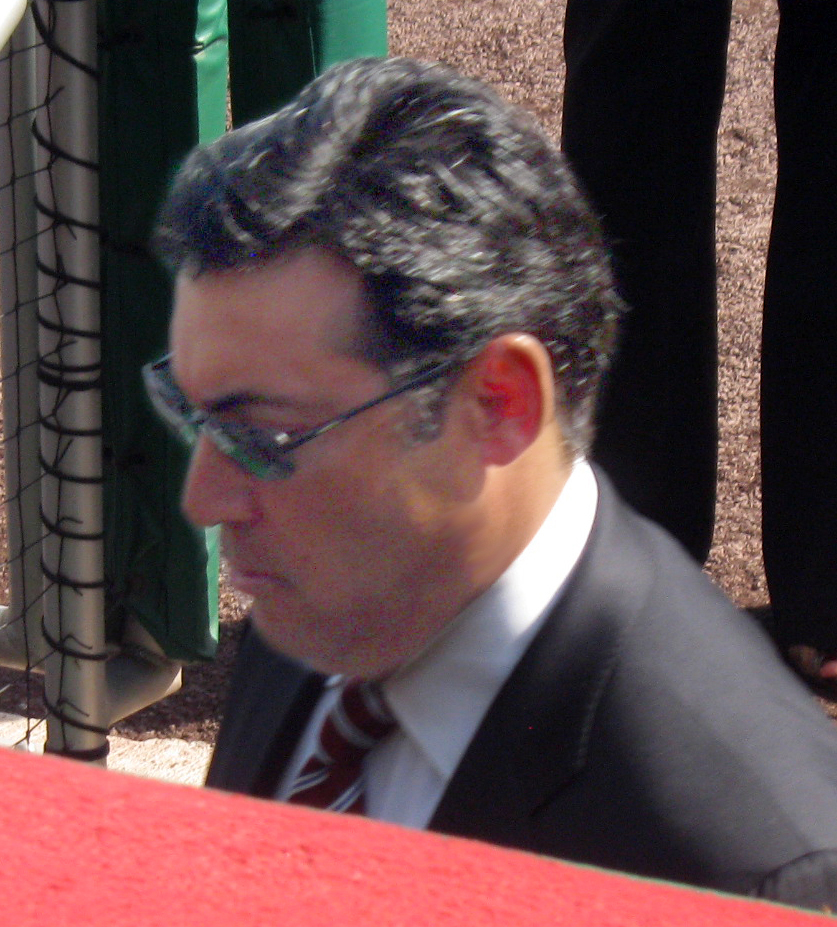
Rubén Amaro Jr.

- Philadelphia Phillies general manager Pat Gillick announced his retirement following the end of the season. The team named Rubén Amaro Jr. as his replacement November 3; Gillick remains as a team consultant.

==== Announcers ====
- Lanny Frattare, longtime radio and cable television voice of the Pittsburgh Pirates, called it a career following the Pirates season, his 33rd in the booth. His trademark victory call was "There was noooooooooooo doubt about it."
- Pete Van Wieren, announcer for the Atlanta Braves since its first broadcasts on then-Superstation TBS in 1976, announced his immediate retirement on October 21. This followed the death of his play-by-play announcer, Skip Caray, earlier in the year.

== Other accomplishments ==
=== Pitching ===
==== No-hitters ====
- Jon Lester of the Boston Red Sox threw the team's 18th no-hitter on May 19 against the Kansas City Royals in a 7–0 victory.
- Carlos Zambrano of the Chicago Cubs tossed the team's first no-hitter since Milt Pappas threw one against the San Diego Padres on September 2, 1972, on September 14 against the Houston Astros in a 5–0 win. The accomplishment was historic as it was the first no-hitter ever hurled at a neutral site, in this case, Milwaukee's Miller Park, which was made possible because the Astros' home, Minute Maid Park was unavailable due to damage in the Houston area from Hurricane Ike.

==== Other notable accomplishments ====
- Edinson Vólquez of the Cincinnati Reds tied a Major League record by going eight starts without allowing more than one earned run. It is the first time this feat has been accomplished since Mike Norris did it for the Oakland Athletics in 1980.
- On June 8, Rich Harden, then a member of the Oakland A's, pitched an immaculate inning (i.e., he struck out all three batters in the inning on the minimum 9 pitches required to do so), becoming the 37th MLB pitcher to do so.
- On June 17, Félix Hernández of the Seattle Mariners pitched an immaculate inning, becoming the 38th MLB pitcher to do so.
- On June 28, Jered Weaver and José Arredondo of the Los Angeles Angels of Anaheim pitched a combined eight innings, allowing no hits in a 1–0 loss to the Los Angeles Dodgers. This became the fifth time in Major League history, and the first time since 1992, that a team has held its opponent hitless in a losing effort. This was not an official MLB-recognized no-hitter, however, because the rulebook states that a no-hitter occurs when a pitcher (or pitchers) holds their opponent hitless over the course of a whole game, which consists of at least nine innings.
- On July 27, rookie pitcher Brad Ziegler of the Oakland Athletics set a Major League record for most consecutive scoreless innings to start a career by pitching his 26th and 27th consecutive scoreless innings in a game against the Texas Rangers.
- Angels then closer, Francisco Rodríguez recorded his 58th save of the season on September 13, breaking the single season record previously held by Bobby Thigpen. "K-Rod" would end the season with 62 saves.
- Oakland Athletics reliever Joey Devine finished the season with a 6–1 record and a 0.59 ERA. That's the lowest single-season ERA in Major League history (since ERA began being recorded in 1912) for a pitcher with a minimum of 40 innings.
- Philadelphia Phillies pitcher Brad Lidge ended the season 48 for 48 in save opportunities, including 2 saves in the World Series

=== Hitting ===
- José López, a second baseman for the Seattle Mariners, became the 12th player in Major League history to hit three sacrifice flies in a single game, doing so during an April 15 game against the Kansas City Royals. The Mariners also became only the third team in Major League history to hit five sacrifice flies in a single game.
- Chase Utley, a second baseman for the Philadelphia Phillies, tied a team record with home runs in 5 consecutive games (twice) that lasted from April 17 to 21. He hit home runs against the Astros, Mets, and Rockies during the streak.
- On May 7, Carlos Gómez of the Minnesota Twins hit for the cycle on the road against the Chicago White Sox. Gómez became the first Twin to hit for the cycle since Kirby Puckett did it in 1986.
- On June 23 at Shea Stadium, Seattle Mariners pitcher Félix Hernández became the first American League pitcher to hit a grand slam in modern Interleague play (the last grand slam hit by an AL pitcher occurred before implementation of the designated hitter rule), as well as the first pitcher in Mariners franchise history to hit a home run.
- Boston Red Sox designated hitter David Ortiz became the fifth player in Major League Baseball history to hit two home runs in the first inning with a pair of three-run four-ply swats on August 11 against the Texas Rangers.
- The Chicago White Sox tied the major league record for most consecutive home runs hit in an inning with four consecutive dingers against the Kansas City Royals in the sixth inning of their game on August 14. Jim Thome began the two-out swatfest with a three-run dinger, which were followed by solo home runs by Paul Konerko, Alexei Ramìrez and Juan Uribe, becoming the sixth group of player to accomplish such a feat.
- Mark Kotsay, Atlanta Braves center fielder, hit for the cycle on August 14 against the Chicago Cubs. However, the Cubs got the win, 11–7. Kostay became the first Brave since Albert Hall did it in September 1987.
- On September 1, Arizona Diamondbacks shortstop Stephen Drew and Seattle Mariners third baseman Adrián Beltré each hit for the cycle in their respective games, the first time two players accomplished the feat on the same day since the Detroit Tigers' Bobby Veach and the New York Giants' George Burns did so in 1920.
- Ichiro Suzuki recorded his 200th hit of the season on September 17. This marked the eighth consecutive season he reached the milestone, tying the record set by "Wee" Willie Keeler from 1894 to 1901.
- Mark Reynolds, the Arizona Diamondbacks' third baseman, broke the record for most strikeouts by a batter by whiffing for the 200th time on September 25 against the St. Louis Cardinals. The previous record was set one year earlier by Philadelphia Phillies first baseman Ryan Howard, who had 199. Reynolds finished with a new record of 204 strikeouts.
- On September 29 Chicago White Sox 2nd-basemen Alexei Ramírez hit his 4th grand slam of the season, breaking the record for most in a season by a rookie. This same hit also broke the franchise record for most grand slams in a single season.

=== Fielding ===
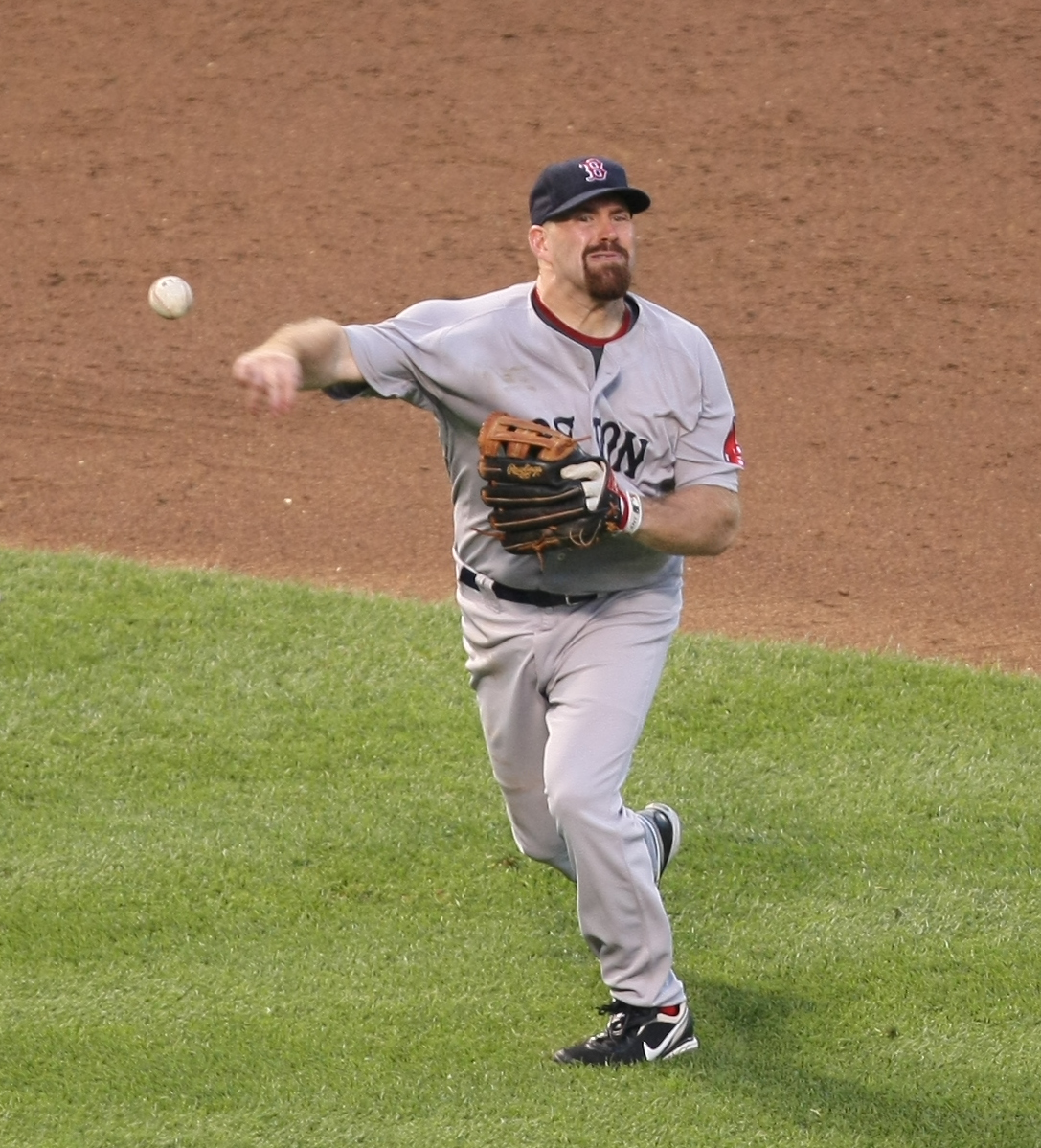
Gold Glove first baseman Kevin Youkilis

- Kevin Youkilis, a first baseman for the Boston Red Sox, set a new Major League record by playing 237 consecutive errorless games at first base. He broke Steve Garvey's 193-game streak record on April 2 against Oakland.
- Asdrúbal Cabrera, a second baseman for the Cleveland Indians recorded the 14th unassisted triple play in baseball history May 12 against the Toronto Blue Jays in the nightcap of a doubleheader at Progressive Field in Cleveland, Ohio. Cabrera caught a Lyle Overbay line drive, then stepped on the bag to retire Kevin Mench, and then tagged the incoming Marco Scutaro to complete the triple play. It was the first unassisted triple play in Indians history since Bill Wambsganss' historic 1920 World Series Game 5 event against the Brooklyn Dodgers. However, the Tribe lost to the Blue Jays by a score of 3–0 in 10 innings.

== Managers ==
American League
Team	Manager	Comments
Baltimore Orioles	Dave Trembley	In his first full season as Orioles skipper, Trembley was given a one-year extension for the 2009 season with an option for 2010.
Boston Red Sox	Terry Francona	
Chicago White Sox	Ozzie Guillén	In his fifth season as Chicago White Sox skipper, Guillén led his team to the American League Central Division title in a one-game playoff against the Minnesota Twins on September 30, 2008.
Cleveland Indians	Eric Wedge	
Detroit Tigers	Jim Leyland	
Kansas City Royals	Trey Hillman	Former Nippon Ham Fighters skipper joined Royals in his first MLB managerial job.
Los Angeles Angels	Mike Scioscia	
Minnesota Twins	Ron Gardenhire	
New York Yankees	Joe Girardi	Replaced Joe Torre with three-year, $6 million deal after being TV analyst for YES and WWOR-TV in 2007.
Oakland Athletics	Bob Geren	
Seattle Mariners	John McLaren	Was in first full season as Mariners' manager until he was sacked June 19; Jim Riggleman replaced McLaren as interim manager for the remainder of the season.
Tampa Bay Rays	Joe Maddon	Lead the Rays to their first playoffs. Won the AL Manager of the Year Award.
Texas Rangers	Ron Washington	
Toronto Blue Jays	John Gibbons	Fired June 20; Cito Gaston returned to dugout as replacement. Following season, Gaston was given a contract extension.
National League
Team	Manager	Comments
Arizona Diamondbacks	Bob Melvin	
Atlanta Braves	Bobby Cox	
Chicago Cubs	Lou Piniella	Led the Cubs to the NLDS, won NL Manager of the year.
Cincinnati Reds	Dusty Baker	After one year at ESPN, Baker returned to dugout with Reds.
Colorado Rockies	Clint Hurdle	
Florida Marlins	Fredi González	
Houston Astros	Cecil Cooper	First full season as Astros' skipper.
Los Angeles Dodgers	Joe Torre	Walked away from Yankees after rejecting one-year deal valued at $7.5 million to join Dodgers.
Milwaukee Brewers	Ned Yost	Fired on September 15; Dale Sveum named interim manager for remainder of season, and led team to wild card. Ken Macha was hired to manage the 2009 season on October 30; Sveum, who was third base coach in 2008, will become hitting coach in 2009 under Macha.
New York Mets	Willie Randolph	Sacked June 17 in middle of night. Jerry Manuel named replacement.
Philadelphia Phillies	Charlie Manuel	Led team to first World Series win in 28 years.
Pittsburgh Pirates	John Russell	Former catcher had his first season as an MLB manager.
St. Louis Cardinals	Tony La Russa	La Russa signed a new two-year contract October 22, 2007, through 2009.
San Diego Padres	Bud Black	
San Francisco Giants	Bruce Bochy	
Washington Nationals	Manny Acta	

== Awards ==
Baseball Writers' Association of America Awards
BBWAA Award	National League	American League
Rookie of the Year	Geovany Soto (CHC)	Evan Longoria (TB)
Cy Young Award	Tim Lincecum (SF)	Cliff Lee (CLE)
Manager of the Year	Lou Piniella (CHC)	Joe Maddon (TB)
Most Valuable Player	Albert Pujols (STL)	Dustin Pedroia (BOS)
Gold Glove Awards
Position	National League	American League
Pitcher	Greg Maddux (SD/LAD)	Mike Mussina (NYY)
Catcher	Yadier Molina (STL)	Joe Mauer (MIN)
1st Base	Adrián González (SD)	Carlos Peña (TB)
2nd Base	Brandon Phillips (CIN)	Dustin Pedroia (BOS)
3rd Base	David Wright (NYM)	Adrián Beltré (SEA)
Shortstop	Jimmy Rollins (PHI)	Michael Young (TEX)
Outfield	Nate McLouth (PIT); Carlos Beltrán (NYM); Shane Victorino (PHI)	Torii Hunter (LAA); Grady Sizemore (CLE); Ichiro Suzuki (SEA)
Silver Slugger Awards
Position	National League	American League
Pitcher/Designated Hitter	Carlos Zambrano (CHC)	Aubrey Huff (BAL)
Catcher	Brian McCann (ATL)	Joe Mauer (MIN)
1st Base	Albert Pujols (STL)	Justin Morneau (MIN)
2nd Base	Chase Utley (PHI)	Dustin Pedroia (BOS)
3rd Base	David Wright (NYM)	Alex Rodriguez (NYY)
Shortstop	Hanley Ramírez (FLA)	Derek Jeter (NYY)
Outfield	Ryan Braun (MIL); Matt Holliday (COL); Ryan Ludwick (STL)	Josh Hamilton (TEX); Carlos Quentin (CWS); Grady Sizemore (CLE)

=== Player of the Month ===
Month	National League	American League
April	Chase Utley (PHI)	Josh Hamilton (TEX)
May	Lance Berkman (HOU)	Josh Hamilton (TEX)
June	Hanley Ramírez (FLA)	J. D. Drew (BOS)
July	Ryan Braun (MIL)	Miguel Cabrera (DET)
August	Manny Ramirez (LAD)	Melvin Mora (BAL)
September	Ryan Howard (PHI)	Shin-Soo Choo (CLE)

=== Pitcher of the Month ===
Month	National League	American League
April	Brandon Webb (AZ)	Cliff Lee (CLE)
May	Todd Wellemeyer (STL)	Scott Kazmir (TB)
June	Dan Haren (AZ)	John Lackey (LAA)
July	CC Sabathia (MIL)	Jon Lester (BOS)
August	CC Sabathia (MIL)	Cliff Lee (CLE)
September	Johan Santana (NYM)	Jon Lester (BOS)

=== Rookie of the Month ===
Month	National League	American League
April	Geovany Soto (CHC)	David Murphy (TEX)
May	Blake DeWitt (LAD)	Aaron Laffey (CLE)
June	Jair Jurrjens (ATL)	Evan Longoria (TB)
July	Ian Stewart (COL)	Chris Davis (TEX)
August	Geovany Soto (CHC)	Alexei Ramírez (CWS)
September	Joey Votto (CIN)	Scott Lewis (CLE)

=== Other awards ===
- Comeback Players of the Year: Cliff Lee (Pitcher, CLE, American); Brad Lidge (Pitcher, PHI, National).
- Edgar Martínez Award (Best designated hitter): Aubrey Huff (BAL)
- Hank Aaron Award: Kevin Youkilis (BOS, American); Aramis Ramírez (CHC, National).
- Roberto Clemente Award (Humanitarian): Albert Pujols (STL).
- Rolaids Relief Man Award: Francisco Rodríguez (LAA, American); Brad Lidge (PHI, National).
- Delivery Man of the Year (Best Reliever): Brad Lidge (PHI).
- Warren Spahn Award (Best left-handed pitcher): CC Sabathia (CLE/MIL)
- Clutch Performer of the Year: CC Sabathia (CLE/MIL).

== Home field attendance and payroll ==
Team name	Wins	%±	Home attendance	%±	Per game	Est. payroll	%±
New York Yankees	89	−5.3%	4,298,655	0.6%	53,070	$212,286,789	2.5%
New York Mets	89	1.1%	4,042,045	4.9%	49,902	$137,793,376	18.6%
Los Angeles Dodgers	84	2.4%	3,730,553	−3.3%	46,056	$118,588,536	9.3%
St. Louis Cardinals	86	10.3%	3,432,917	−3.4%	42,382	$99,624,449	10.3%
Philadelphia Phillies	92	3.4%	3,422,583	10.1%	42,254	$97,879,880	9.5%
Los Angeles Angels of Anaheim	100	6.4%	3,336,747	−0.9%	41,194	$119,216,333	9.1%
Chicago Cubs	97	14.1%	3,300,200	1.5%	40,743	$120,345,833	18.4%
Detroit Tigers	74	−15.9%	3,202,645	5.1%	39,539	$138,785,196	45.8%
Milwaukee Brewers	90	8.4%	3,068,458	6.9%	37,882	$80,937,499	14.0%
Boston Red Sox	95	−1.0%	3,048,250	2.6%	37,633	$133,390,035	−6.7%
San Francisco Giants	72	1.4%	2,863,837	−11.1%	35,356	$76,594,500	−15.1%
Houston Astros	86	17.8%	2,779,487	−8.0%	34,744	$87,946,807	0.2%
Colorado Rockies	74	−17.8%	2,650,218	11.5%	32,719	$68,655,500	27.0%
Atlanta Braves	72	−14.3%	2,532,834	−7.7%	31,270	$102,365,683	17.3%
Arizona Diamondbacks	82	−8.9%	2,509,924	7.9%	30,987	$66,202,712	27.1%
Chicago White Sox	89	23.6%	2,500,648	−6.8%	30,496	$121,189,332	11.5%
San Diego Padres	63	−29.2%	2,427,535	−13.0%	29,970	$73,677,616	26.8%
Toronto Blue Jays	86	3.6%	2,399,786	1.7%	29,627	$97,793,900	19.3%
Seattle Mariners	61	−30.7%	2,329,702	−12.8%	28,762	$117,666,482	10.5%
Washington Nationals	59	−19.2%	2,320,400	19.4%	29,005	$54,961,000	48.8%
Minnesota Twins	88	11.4%	2,302,431	0.3%	28,425	$56,932,766	−20.3%
Cleveland Indians	81	−15.6%	2,169,760	−4.7%	26,787	$78,970,066	28.0%
Cincinnati Reds	74	2.8%	2,058,632	0.0%	25,415	$74,167,695	8.2%
Baltimore Orioles	68	−1.4%	1,950,075	−9.9%	24,376	$67,196,246	−27.9%
Texas Rangers	79	5.3%	1,945,677	−17.3%	24,021	$68,037,326	−0.9%
Tampa Bay Rays	97	47.0%	1,811,986	30.6%	22,370	$44,970,597	82.6%
Oakland Athletics	75	−1.3%	1,665,256	−13.4%	20,559	$47,967,126	−39.6%
Pittsburgh Pirates	67	−1.5%	1,609,076	−8.0%	19,865	$48,689,783	26.3%
Kansas City Royals	75	8.7%	1,578,922	−2.3%	19,493	$59,445,500	−12.2%
Florida Marlins	84	18.3%	1,335,076	−2.6%	16,482	$21,811,500	−28.5%

== Stadiums ==
=== Spring training ===
==== Openings and closings ====
The 2008 Spring training session was marked by the final at-bats for three stadiums that had been mainstays in the Grapefruit League, as the spring training sites in Florida are called.

The first to end its run was Holman Stadium, longtime home to the Los Angeles Dodgers. On March 17, the Dodgers played their last game in Vero Beach; they lost to the Houston Astros, 12–10. It has been rumored that the Baltimore Orioles might move into the facility.

The next stadium to close its doors was Chain of Lakes Park in Winter Haven, home of the Cleveland Indians. On March 27, they lost their final game in the stadium to the Tampa Bay Rays, 9–7 in 10 innings. Both the Dodgers and the Indians left their longtime Florida homes for new stadiums in the Cactus League in Arizona.

The oldest of them all, Progress Energy Park, home of Al Lang Field in St. Petersburg, was retired on March 28 with the Tampa Bay Rays losing to the Cincinnati Reds 6–3. The Rays, unlike the other teams to close stadiums before them, are staying in Florida; they are relocating their spring training home to the Charlotte Sports Park in Port Charlotte, where they spent $20 million to rebuild its main stadium. The site of Progress Energy Park was connected to plans to build a new retractable roof stadium for the Rays to replace the fixed-dome Tropicana Field, but was eventually withdrawn from consideration by team ownership in favor of a more thorough study.

==== Exhibitions ====
On March 15 and 16, the Los Angeles Dodgers and San Diego Padres played a 2-game exhibition series at Wukesong Stadium in Beijing, China, which would later be the baseball venue for the 2008 Summer Olympics. The series marked MLB's first games played in China. The first game ended in a 3–3 tie, and the second ended in a 6–3 win for the Dodgers.

On March 29, as part of the 50th anniversary of the Dodgers' relocation from Brooklyn to Los Angeles, the Dodgers hosted an exhibition game against the Boston Red Sox at the Los Angeles Memorial Coliseum, the Dodgers' home stadium from 1958 to 1961. Proceeds from the game were donated to the Dodgers' official charity, ThinkCure. The game saw a sellout crowd of 115,300, which broke the Guinness World Record for the largest crowd to ever attend a baseball game. The previous record was an estimated 114,000 for a baseball demonstration during the 1956 Summer Olympics at the Melbourne Cricket Ground.

=== Regular season ===
==== Openings and closings ====
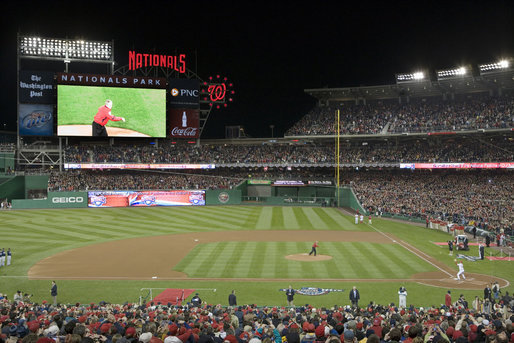
President George W. Bush throws the ceremonial first pitch before a sold-out crowd at the Washington Nationals season opener on March 30 at their new park, Nationals Park

The Washington Nationals began the domestic portion of the 2008 season in their new US$611 million home, Nationals Park in Washington, D.C., with a nationally telecast ESPN Sunday Night Baseball game (in a rare one-game series) against the Atlanta Braves on March 30 in the first official baseball game stateside. President Bush threw out the ceremonial first pitch while being booed by some of the crowd that night, and joined Jon Miller and Joe Morgan in the broadcast booth for the third and part of the fourth inning of the game telecast. Fittingly, Ryan Zimmerman hit a walk-off home run to give the Nats a 3–2 win. Nationals Park replaced their temporary home, RFK Stadium. Unlike RFK, Nationals Park has been considered to be fair to both hitters and pitchers. Additionally, there was an exhibition game March 29 against their beltway rivals, the Baltimore Orioles, in which season ticket holders were admitted free. The first game, however, was on March 22, when local university George Washington played a home Atlantic 10 college contest against Saint Joseph's at Nationals Park. The Colonials sent their fans home happy by defeating the Hawks 9–5.

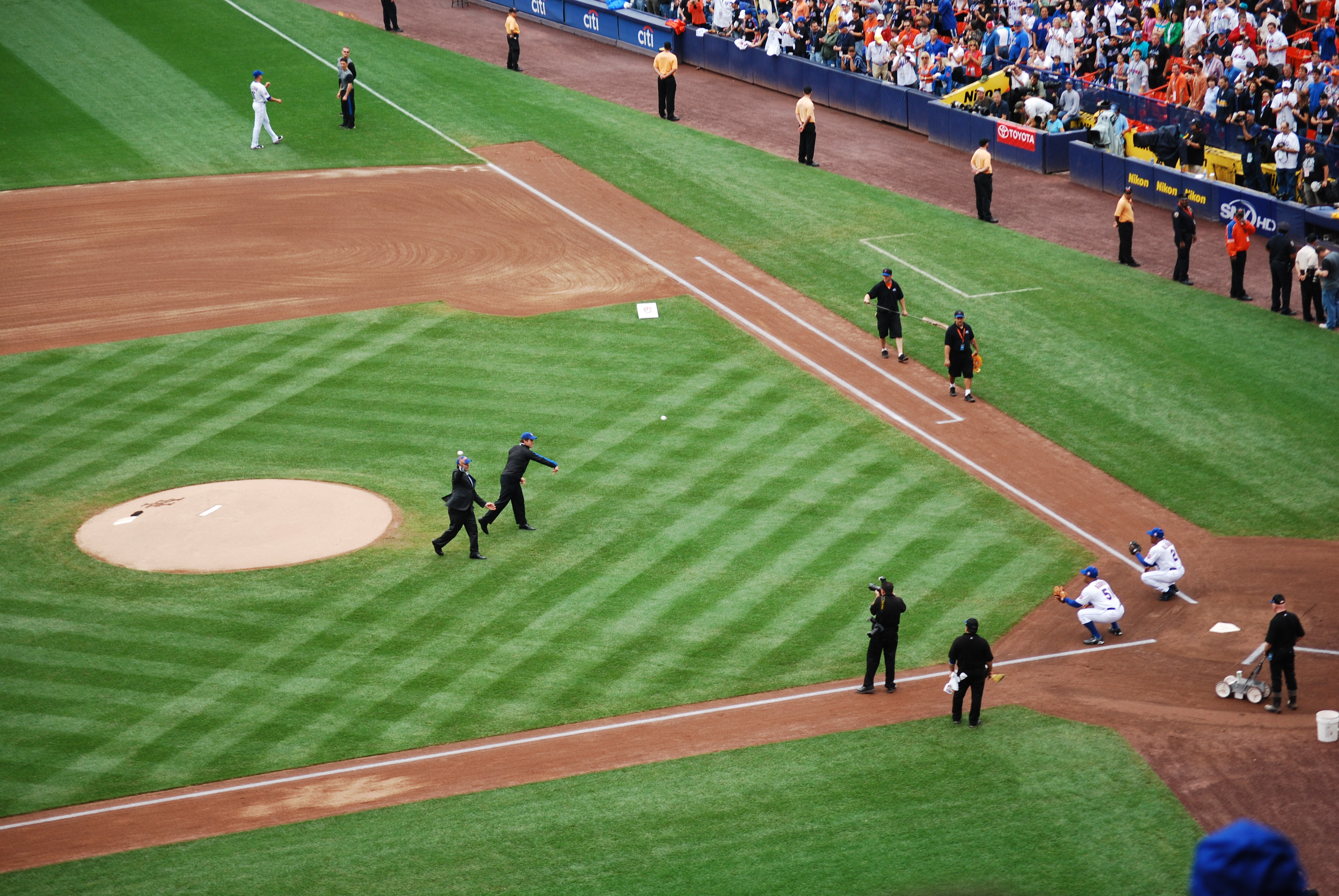
Ceremonial first pitch in Shea Stadium

This season also marked the last season in New York City for two historic stadiums where the Mets and Yankees reside. Shea Stadium closed in Flushing Meadows, Queens on a down note September 28 with the Mets being eliminated from postseason play for the second consecutive season by the Marlins, 4–2, while Yankee Stadium closed after 83 seasons (the Yankees played at Shea Stadium in 1974 and 1975 while Yankee Stadium was refurbished), with the final home game played on September 21 as the Bronx Bombers defeated the Orioles, 7–3. The teams will move into new ballparks near their current homes – Citi Field for the Mets and New Yankee Stadium for the Yankees – in time for their 2009 home openers on April 13 against the San Diego Padres (Citi Field) and 16th against Cleveland Indians (New Yankee Stadium) respectively. With the closing of these ballparks, Dodger Stadium becomes the largest seating capacity park (56,000) and third oldest baseball stadium (after Fenway Park and Wrigley Field) starting in 2009, and Angel Stadium of Anaheim (built in 1966) and Oakland–Alameda County Coliseum (first baseball game in 1968; stadium was built in 1966) become the fourth and fifth oldest baseball stadiums, respectively.

==== Naming rights ====
Starting with the 2008 season, the Cleveland Indians' home field was renamed Progressive Field – after the insurance company based in suburban Mayfield Heights – in a deal valued at US$57.6 million over the next sixteen seasons. The new name replaces Jacobs Field, named for former team owner Richard Jacobs.

Another naming rights agreement concerned a stadium still under construction. The Minnesota Twins and Minneapolis-based retail giant Target Corporation announced on September 15 that the Twins' new stadium set to open in 2010 will be named Target Field. Financial terms of the agreement were not disclosed. Target Field is located not far from another facility of which the discount retailer owns naming rights: Target Center the home of the NBA's Timberwolves.

On September 19, the naming rights contract owned by McAfee for Oakland–Alameda County Coliseum lapsed; McAfee declined a new contract offer. The Coliseum, home to the Oakland Athletics since their 1968 relocation from Kansas City, reverted to its old name after 10 years, during which it was originally known as Network Associates Coliseum, then McAfee Coliseum when the company changed its name in 2004. The A's played their last home series after the stadium reverted its name.

==== Other ====
As a consequence of Hurricane Ike damaging the Houston area, two games between the Houston Astros and Chicago Cubs were relocated to Miller Park in Milwaukee. Although Milwaukee was picked as a "neutral" site whose retractable roof would ensure the game would be played in the event of inclement weather, Miller Park's location 90 miles (140 km) from Chicago – and well over 1,000 miles (1,600 km) from Houston – resulted in a decidedly pro-Cubs crowd in a series where Houston was officially designated as the home team. Adding to the controversy from the Houston perspective was that Turner Field in Atlanta had been suggested by the players' union as a potential neutral site. This would mark the second time in as many years that a series was moved to neutral Miller Park due to weather, as a series between the Seattle Mariners and Cleveland Indians was relocated there one year earlier as a consequence of snow storms in northern Ohio.

== Instant Replay ==
During last season, especially the ALCS, several plays were deemed to be considered controversial on whether or not balls were ruled home runs. During a game in the annual interleague Subway Series between the Mets and the Yankees at Yankee Stadium, a home run was taken away and ruled a ground rule double. This led to discussions about introducing instant replay to baseball games, especially on balls that are ruled fair or foul and home runs. In August, all 30 parks have been wired to send feeds similar to a video goal judge in the NHL, where all video feeds are sent to a central control room at Major League Baseball Advanced Media's home office in New York City to be reviewed, and correct any errors. On August 20, MLB and the World Umpires Association, the umpires union, agreed to start reviews based only on whether or not a ball that is ruled a home run was fair or foul, or whether or not balls that clear walls are home runs according to each team's ground rules. This practice started August 28.

The first official use of the Instant Replay system occurred on Wednesday, September 3 in a game between the New York Yankees and Tampa Bay Rays at Tropicana Field, when Alex Rodriguez hit a home run in the top of the ninth inning with two outs remaining. Tampa Bay catcher Dioner Navarro and manager Joe Maddon initially protested in order to reverse the call as it appeared to be foul. Television replays showed the ball hit Tropicana Field's D-Ring catwalk on the foul side of the attached yellow post; however, the ball was still in fair territory when it left the playing field (passing over the foul pole) and was therefore a home run. Umpire crew chief Charlie Reliford agreed to the review and after a delay of 2 minutes and 15 seconds, the ruling on the field was upheld and remained a home run.

Replay made its National League debut on September 9 at Minute Maid Park in a game between the Houston Astros and Pittsburgh Pirates. Houston right fielder Hunter Pence hit a fly ball to right field that bounced off the top of the fence and back onto the field of play. The umpires on the field ruled a live ball, and Pence was credited with a double. Houston manager Cecil Cooper argued the ball bounced beyond the fence before bouncing back onto the field and was therefore a home run. After a discussion among the umpires, crew chief Tim Welke allowed the review and reviewed the play with his brother Bill Welke, the home plate umpire. After the review the call was upheld as a double.

The first call to be reversed by instant replay occurred on September 19, and again involved the Tampa Bay Rays in a game against the Minnesota Twins at Tropicana Field. A fly ball hit by Rays' first baseman Carlos Peña, the umpires ruled, was interfered with by a fan sitting in the front row of the stands, when the ball hit the hands of the fan and fell back onto the field of play. The umpires originally ruled that the fan reached over the wall to touch the ball. After Rays manager Joe Maddon requested the umpires hold a conference to discuss the play, the umpires, headed by Gerry Davis, decided to look at instant replay. Replays showed that the fan did not reach over the wall; the ball was over the wall when he tried to catch the ball, and the ball bounced back onto the field. Just over four minutes later, Davis returned to the field and signaled that the ball was a home run.

The use of replay created a statistical anomaly September 26, in which San Francisco Giants catcher Bengie Molina hit what was ruled a single off the high wall in right field at AT&T Park in San Francisco, in a game against the Los Angeles Dodgers. Once he reached base, Molina was replaced by pinch runner Emmanuel Burriss, while Umpires conferred on whether the ball had actually hit the roof and bounced back, which would make it a home run. After a replay review, the umpires reversed their call, awarding Molina the home run. Giants manager Bruce Bochy then attempted to retract Burriss from the game, and put back Molina, under the logic that he wouldn't have pulled Molina had the correct call of home run been made in the first place. After a 15-minute delay, the umpires denied Bochy, citing the replacement rule. Burriss was told to complete the home run circuit, making it a two-run home run in which Molina, who had hit it, didn't score.

== Media coverage ==
=== United States ===
For the 2008 season, TBS switched from doing Atlanta Braves games (who telecast 45 contests on WPCH-TV a/k/a "Peachtree TV" locally in Atlanta) to a national Sunday afternoon Game of the Week format (though some games have involved the Braves). In addition, the Time Warner-owned cable channel also carried the one-game AL Central playoff between the Minnesota Twins and the Chicago White Sox on September 30 as well as the entire League Division Series and the American League Championship Series this season, with TNT possibly carrying some games when there are time conflicts.

Disney-owned ESPN continued to televise games on Sunday nights, Wednesday nights and (through the first week in August) Monday nights, switching to Friday nights for the remainder of the season, plus multiple afternoon and prime-time games on the traditional Opening Day (March 31) and the annual State Farm Home Run Derby on July 14. Certain games aired on ESPN2 due to scheduling conflicts with the parent network.

Fox Sports continued with a weekly regional Saturday Game of the Week, the All-Star Game, the National League Championship Series and the World Series. The Game of the Week was expanded in 2007, as for the first time FOX was allowed to air Saturday games for all 26 weeks of the season, marking the first time since 1989, when NBC ended their iconic run of televising America's Pastime on a weekly basis, that a network covered games on a week to week basis for the entire season. Also, all games on FOX were televised in high definition; in previous years, only the primary (or "A") game was in HD.

The limits for telecasts per season (starting in 2008) that any team can make are as follows:

- TBS: 13 times per season.
- ESPN: Five Sunday night games per season.
- FOX: Eight games per season.

ESPN Radio continued as the national radio carrier for Major League Baseball, airing Sunday night games throughout the regular season as well as Saturday afternoon games after the All-Star break, the All-Star Game and Home Run Derby, along with selected Opening Day and holiday games, and the entire postseason.

The biggest change in local rights came as the San Francisco Giants switched their terrestrial telecast rights from longtime home KTVU (Cox Communications-owned Fox affiliate) to NBC Universal-owned KNTV after fifty years, one of the longest in televised sports history. KTVU will continue to air some Giants games as part of the Fox Sports' Saturday afternoon Game of the Week package if the team is competitive.

=== Canada ===
Baseball games – mostly involving the Toronto Blue Jays – were televised on Rogers Sportsnet, TSN and CBC. RSN airs Fox and ESPN/ESPN 2 feeds if they do not conflict with the Toronto Blue Jays games, as well as the All-Star Game and the entire post-season.

== Tampa Bay Devil Rays drop the "Devil" ==
- In a ceremony November 8, 2007, the Tampa Bay Devil Rays debuted a new set of uniforms and changed the team name to the Tampa Bay Rays. The ceremony took place in St. Petersburg, Florida and it featured a concert by Kevin Costner's band, Modern West.

== Apparel ==
=== Commemorative patches ===
- With the previously mentioned Nationals, Yankees and Mets stadiums, those teams wore commemorative patches on their home and away uniforms.
- The Cincinnati Reds paid tribute to Joe Nuxhall with a black patch with "NUXY" (his nickname) in white lettering.
- The Atlanta Braves honored their former bench coach Jim Beauchamp with a patch bearing his nickname ("Beach") following his death on Christmas Day 2007 from leukemia, and in August 2008 added a memorial patch for longtime announcer Skip Caray on their right sleeve following his death.
- The Yankees, who hosted the 2008 MLB All-Star Game, also wore the game patch on their uniform right sleeves. They added an armband on their left sleeve following the passing of former player and announcer Bobby Murcer from cancer just days before said All-Star Game.
- Both the Los Angeles Dodgers and the San Francisco Giants wore special patches to commemorate the 50th Anniversary of their franchises moving to California from the New York area – the Dodgers from Brooklyn's Ebbets Field to Los Angeles and the Giants from the Polo Grounds to San Francisco.
- The Arizona Diamondbacks wore a 10th Anniversary patch, celebrating a Decade in the Desert
- The Oakland Athletics celebrated their 40th Anniversary on the East Side of San Francisco Bay.

=== Throwback/Alternate uniforms ===
- The Philadelphia Phillies added an alternate uniform that emulates their 1948 uniforms, which was all off-white with no red pinstripes, but have red and blue trim around the neck, sleeve ends and outseams of the pants, and a blue hat with a red "P" and bill. The interleague alternate hat (Red hat with blue bill with white P with blue star in the middle) was dropped;
- The Cleveland Indians added an alternate off-white home uniform, based on the one worn in the late 1950s and early 1960s without player names on the back, replacing their "Chief Wahoo" vest;
- The Kansas City Royals added an alternate light blue jersey based on their successful era from the 1970s and 1980s;
- The Toronto Blue Jays wore a replica of their 1979 road uniform – complete with pullover jersey and belt loops with a blue belt that were not featured in the original outfits (there was a blue/white/blue knit-in belt) to be worn on Friday night home games. The Jays also had a new road uniform with blue lettering and numbers, a change from the gray-on-gray numbering from a year ago. The Jays utilized 'Flashback Friday', where they would use a retro uniform every Friday at the Rogers Centre.
- Additionally, teams such as the Chicago White Sox, San Diego Padres, Los Angeles Angels of Anaheim and Seattle Mariners wore throwback uniforms in "Turn Back the Clock Day" events as a tribute to a particular year in that team's history. Two of the more notable throwback uniforms started on June 12, when the Chicago Cubs and the Atlanta Braves wore 1948-styled uniforms to commemorate the 60th anniversary of Cubs games being broadcast on WGN-TV. The Atlanta Braves wore Boston Braves uniforms because they didn't move to Atlanta until 1966, moving to Milwaukee in 1953. The game, which was played at Wrigley Field was broadcast in black and white, as they did in 1948, for the first two innings. Also notable was when the Pittsburgh Pirates celebrated baseball's Negro league heritage by wearing the uniform of the 1933–38 Pittsburgh Crawfords during several Saturday home games, and in Washington on May 3, the Pirates and the Washington Nationals wore the home and road uniforms of the Homestead Grays, a team which used both Pittsburgh and Washington as their "home" city. The Tampa Bay Rays (dressed as the Jacksonville Red Caps) participated on June 28, and the Milwaukee Brewers (dressed as the Milwaukee Bears) participated on July 5. The Detroit Tigers (1920 Detroit Stars) and Kansas City Royals (Kansas City Monarchs) also paid annual tributes to this era in the season.
- The Oakland Athletics brought back their black alternate jerseys and caps (with modifications of the jersey) from the 2000 season.
- The Atlanta Braves began wearing new blue jerseys for Sunday away games.
- After discarding them for one season, the Chicago Cubs revived the blue alternate jersey.
- The Chicago White Sox dropped the pinstriped alternate home vests.

=== Military tributes ===
Several teams wore special uniforms to honor military serving overseas:

- The San Diego Padres donned their camouflage jerseys for every Sunday home game, while the White Sox and the Reds each honored the military with camouflage jerseys in a "one-off" event during the July 4th holiday weekend;
- All teams during the July 4 weekend and on September 11 wore special caps with each team's cap logo woven into the "Stars and Stripes" (with the exception of the Toronto Blue Jays, whose logo is woven with the Canadian flag). The sales of these caps to the public will benefit Welcome Back Veterans, a group of veterans organizations.

=== Helmets for coaches ===
- Following the death of Colorado Rockies minor league coach Mike Coolbaugh as a result of a foul ball striking him on the neck, all coaches on the first and third base lines began to wear batting helmets as a mandatory rule starting this season.

=== Other ===
- The Oakland Athletics wore their classic white cleats for the first time since 1999.

== Weather ==
Through the 2008 All-Star break, there had not been an official game called that was not suspendable. As of the break, every win and loss in the standings for every team represented a game played to its legitimate nine-inning (or more) completion. The streak ended on August 4 in Chicago, however, when the Chicago Cubs and Houston Astros were unable to complete their game due to a rainstorm. The Astros were leading the game 2–0 in the 8th inning, and since that was the score when the inning started, the game was not resumeable to the next day and the Astros were awarded the "win". This was the only game to be rain shortened until September 26, when the Toronto Blue Jays defeated the Baltimore Orioles in a game curtailed to seven innings, 2–0. The next day, the Jays lost another rain-shortened game against the O's, 2–1 after 6 innings.

Both the Astros and the Cubs were also involved in a rare "rain-in" due to Hurricane Ike postponing the first two games of their three-game series on September 12 and 13; the city of Houston had been evacuated so they were not able to play at the retractable-roof Minute Maid Park. The last rain-in was on June 15, 1976, when the Astros' game at the Astrodome against the Pittsburgh Pirates was called due to heavy flooding in the Houston area. Two of the games were played at Miller Park in Milwaukee on September 14 and 15, the remaining game was canceled outright, one of three games that would be outright canceled, the first being the Oakland Athletics scheduled to play the Orioles on September 7; however, the game was switched due to a conflict with the Baltimore Ravens' NFL season opener against the Cincinnati Bengals. This game was moved to September 6 as part of a day/night doubleheader. However, the remnants of Hurricane Hanna called off the afternoon game, and because both teams were not in the pennant races, the game was not made up, in spite of the fact that both teams still had two common off days.

In another weather-related note involving a team playing in an indoor venue, the Tampa Bay Devil Rays/Tampa Bay Rays had either postponed or canceled a home game on a Sunday in September of a presidential election year three consecutive times due to hurricanes. The streak started on September 17, 2000, and continued on September 5 and 26, 2004. The streak ended when the Rays played their game against the Minnesota Twins as scheduled on September 21, 2008. They played at home on the final day of the 2000 season, but that game was on October 1, not September.

The 2008 season also marked the first time Citizens Bank Park, home of the Philadelphia Phillies and Busch Stadium, home to the St. Louis Cardinals made it through an entire season without a game either being canceled or shortened. The Washington Nationals came close, but their home finale at Nationals Park was canceled on September 25.

On September 29, one day after the scheduled final day of the season, the Detroit Tigers and Chicago White Sox made up a game postponed from two weeks earlier, the first such game since 1981, as in 1908 and 1973. The game needed to be played because the White Sox trailed the Minnesota Twins by a half-game in the AL Central standings following play on September 28, and even then, rain was a problem as the contest was delayed for three hours and four minutes.

On October 27, Game 5 of the World Series between the Tampa Bay Rays and the Philadelphia Phillies was suspended in the bottom of the 6th with the score tied 2–2 and the Phillies leading 3–1 in games. This marked the first time in World Series history that a game was suspended. The game finished with the Phillies winning 4–3, at home on October 29. However, the official records will indicate that the game was played on October 27, the game's original date.

== See also ==
- 2008 Korea Professional Baseball season
- 2008 Nippon Professional Baseball season
