= List of Major League Baseball career home run leaders =

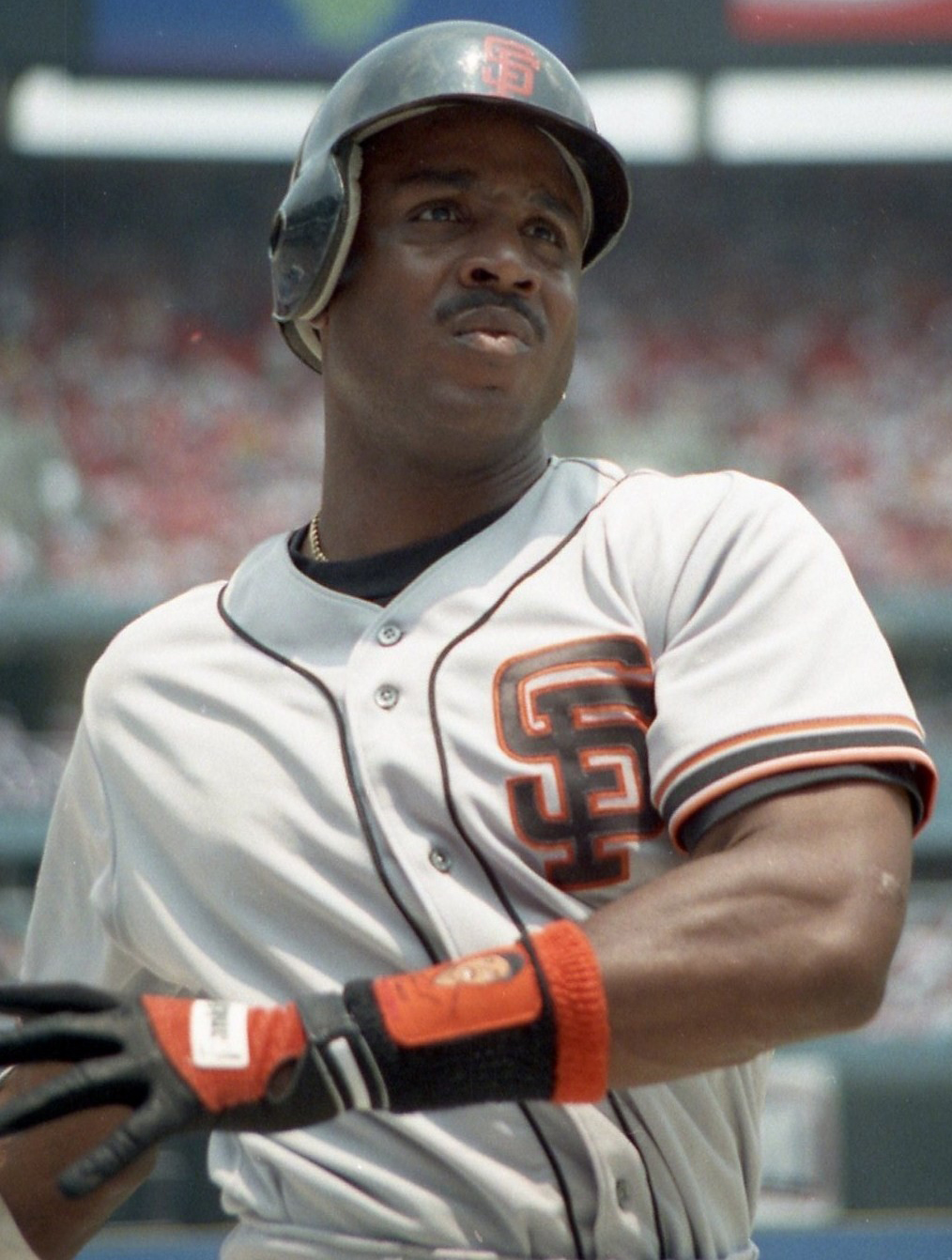
Barry Bonds holds the record for most career home runs, hitting 762 over his 22-year career.

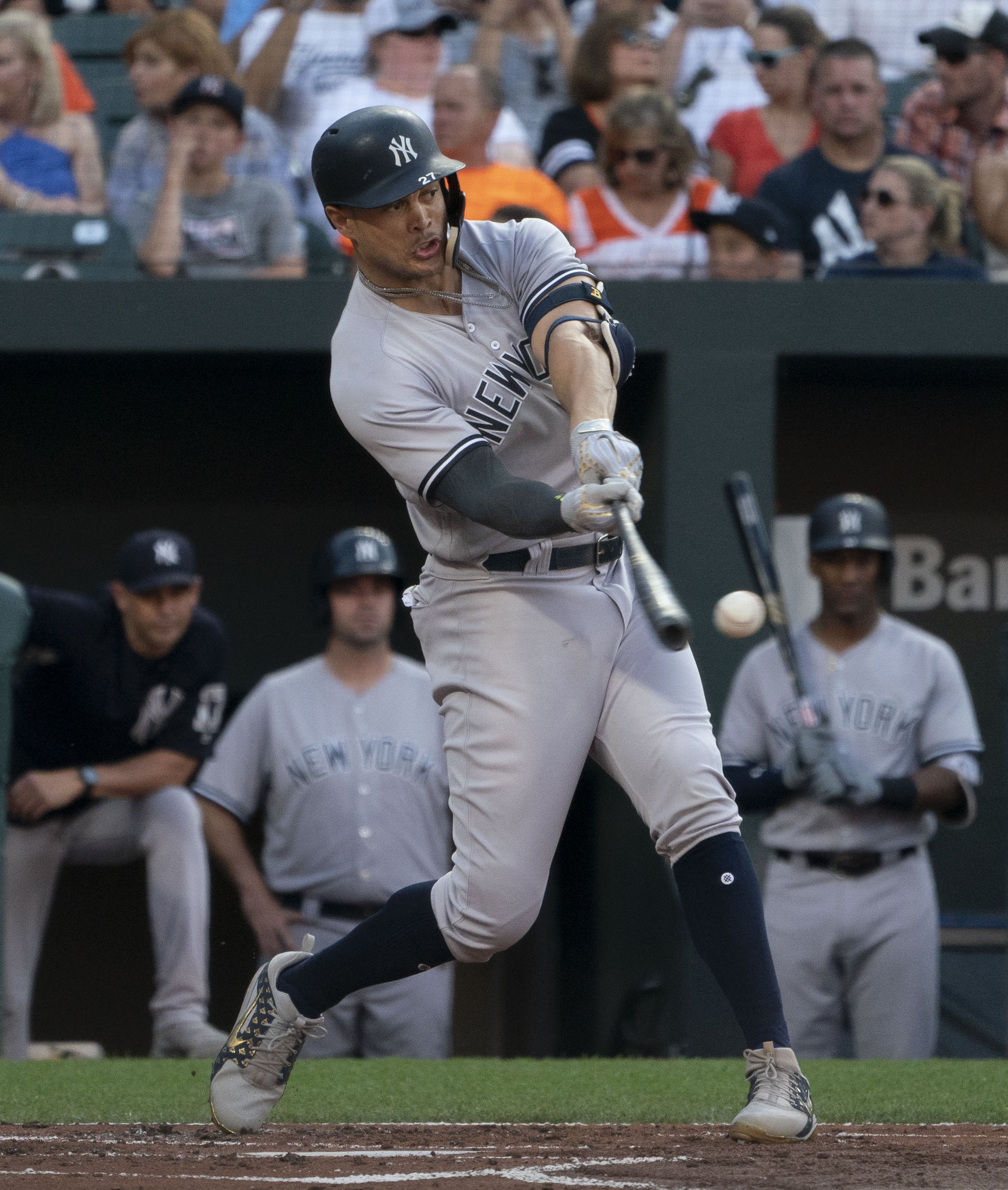
Giancarlo Stanton is the active home run leader with 456 and is 40th all-time.

This is a list of the 300 Major League Baseball players who have hit the most career home runs in regular season play (i.e., excluding playoffs or exhibition games).

In the sport of baseball, a home run is a hit in which the batter scores by circling all the bases and reaching home plate in one play, without the benefit of a fielding error. This can be accomplished either by hitting the ball out of play while it is still in fair territory (a conventional home run) or by an inside-the-park home run.

Barry Bonds holds the Major League Baseball home run record with 762. (Note: While Bonds holds the MLB career home run record, the world career home run record is held by Sadaharu Oh (868); Oh played his whole career in Nippon Professional Baseball in Japan.) He passed Hank Aaron, who hit 755, on August 7, 2007. The only other players to have hit 700 or more are Babe Ruth with 714, and Albert Pujols with 703. Alex Rodriguez (696), Willie Mays (660), Ken Griffey Jr. (630), Jim Thome (612), and Sammy Sosa (609) are the only other players to have hit 600 or more.

Giancarlo Stanton is the active home run leader and currently 40th all-time with 456.

Players in bold face are active as of the 2027 Major League Baseball season (including free agents), with the number in parentheses designating the number of home runs they have hit during the 2027 season. The last change in the cutoff for the top 300 occurred on July 20, 2026 when Joc Pederson hit his 235th career home run, passing Carlos González, Gary Matthews, Kevin Mitchell and Paul Molitor.

== Key ==
**Rank**	Among players by career home runs. A blank field indicates a tie.
**Player (2027 HRs)**	Home runs hit in 2027.
**HR**	Career home runs.
*	Elected to National Baseball Hall of Fame.
**Bold**	Active player. (Note: A player is considered inactive if he has announced his retirement or has not played for a full season.)

== List ==
- Stats updated as of 2026 season

Rank	Player (2027 HRs)	HR
1	Barry Bonds	762
2	Hank Aaron*	755
3	Babe Ruth*	714
4	Albert Pujols	703
5	Alex Rodriguez	696
6	Willie Mays*	660
7	Ken Griffey Jr.*	630
8	Jim Thome*	612
9	Sammy Sosa	609
10	Frank Robinson*	586
11	Mark McGwire	583
12	Harmon Killebrew*	573
13	Rafael Palmeiro	569
14	Reggie Jackson*	563
15	Manny Ramirez	555
16	Mike Schmidt*	548
17	David Ortiz*	541
18	Mickey Mantle*	536
19	Jimmie Foxx*	534
20	Willie McCovey*	521
	Frank Thomas*	521
	Ted Williams*	521
23	Ernie Banks*	512
	Eddie Mathews*	512
25	Miguel Cabrera	511
	Mel Ott*	511
27	Gary Sheffield	509
28	Eddie Murray*	504
29	Lou Gehrig*	493
	Fred McGriff*	493
31	Adrián Beltré*	477
32	Stan Musial*	475
	Willie Stargell*	475
34	Carlos Delgado	473
35	Chipper Jones*	468
36	Dave Winfield*	465
37	Nelson Cruz	464
38	Jose Canseco	462
	Adam Dunn	462
40	**Giancarlo Stanton (0)**	456
41	Carl Yastrzemski*	452
42	Jeff Bagwell*	449
	Vladimir Guerrero*	449
44	Dave Kingman	442
45	Jason Giambi	440
46	Paul Konerko	439
47	Andre Dawson*	438
48	Carlos Beltrán*	435
49	Juan González	434
	Andruw Jones*	434
51	Cal Ripken Jr.*	431
52	Mike Piazza*	427
53	**Mike Trout (0)**	426
	Billy Williams*	426
55	Edwin Encarnación	424
56	Darrell Evans	414
57	Alfonso Soriano	412
58	Mark Teixeira	409
59	Duke Snider*	407
60	Andrés Galarraga	399
	Al Kaline*	399
	**Manny Machado (0)**	399
63	Dale Murphy	398
64	Joe Carter	396
65	Jim Edmonds	393
66	**Bryce Harper (0)**	392
67	**Paul Goldschmidt (0)**	390
	Graig Nettles	390
69	Johnny Bench*	389
70	**Aaron Judge (0)**	386
	Aramis Ramírez	386
72	Dwight Evans	385
	**Kyle Schwarber (0)**	385
74	Harold Baines*	384
75	**Nolan Arenado (0)**	383

Rank	Player (2027 HRs)	HR
	**Freddie Freeman (0)**	383
	Larry Walker*	383
78	Frank Howard	382
	Ryan Howard	382
	Jim Rice*	382
81	Albert Belle	381
82	Orlando Cepeda*	379
	Tony Pérez*	379
84	Matt Williams	378
85	Norm Cash	377
	Jeff Kent*	377
87	Carlton Fisk*	376
88	Rocky Colavito	374
89	Gil Hodges*	370
90	Todd Helton*	369
	Ralph Kiner*	369
92	Lance Berkman	366
93	Joe DiMaggio*	361
94	Gary Gaetti	360
95	Johnny Mize*	359
96	Yogi Berra*	358
	Carlos Lee	358
98	Joey Votto	356
99	Greg Vaughn	355
100	Luis Gonzalez	354
	Lee May	354
102	Torii Hunter	353
103	Ryan Braun	352
	Ellis Burks	352
105	Dick Allen*	351
	**Eugenio Suárez (0)**	351
107	Chili Davis	350
108	George Foster	348
109	José Bautista	344
	Curtis Granderson	344
111	Evan Longoria	342
	Ron Santo*	342
113	Jack Clark	340
114	Tino Martinez	339
	Dave Parker*	339
	Boog Powell	339
117	Don Baylor	338
118	Joe Adcock	336
119	Robinson Canó	335
	**Carlos Santana (0)**	335
	Darryl Strawberry	335
122	**Andrew McCutchen (0)**	333
123	Moisés Alou	332
	Bobby Bonds	332
125	Hank Greenberg*	331
	Derrek Lee	331
	J. D. Martinez	331
128	**Matt Olson (0)**	329
129	Shawn Green	328
	Mo Vaughn	328
131	Jermaine Dye	325
	Willie Horton	325
	Justin Upton	325
134	Gary Carter*	324
	Lance Parrish	324
	**Salvador Perez (0)**	324
137	Ron Gant	321
138	Vinny Castilla	320
	Troy Glaus	320
140	Jay Bruce	319
	Cecil Fielder	319
	Prince Fielder	319
143	Roy Sievers	318
144	George Brett*	317
	Adrián González	317
146	Ron Cey	316
	Matt Holliday	316
	Scott Rolen*	316
149	Jeromy Burnitz	315
150	**Mookie Betts (0)**	314

Rank	Player (2027 HRs)	HR
	Reggie Smith	314
152	Iván Rodríguez*	311
153	Jay Buhner	310
	**Shohei Ohtani (0)**	310
155	Edgar Martínez*	309
156	**George Springer (0)**	308
157	**Pete Alonso (0)**	307
	Greg Luzinski	307
	Al Simmons*	307
	Miguel Tejada	307
161	Fred Lynn	306
	Richie Sexson	306
	Rubén Sierra	306
164	Raúl Ibañez	305
	David Justice	305
	Reggie Sanders	305
167	Steve Finley	304
	**Marcell Ozuna (0)**	304
169	Anthony Rizzo	303
170	Rogers Hornsby*	301
171	Chuck Klein*	300
	**Francisco Lindor (0)**	300
173	Tim Salmon	299
174	Mark Reynolds	298
175	Rickey Henderson*	297
	**José Ramírez (0)**	297
177	Chris Davis	295
178	Magglio Ordóñez	294
	Robin Ventura	294
180	Kent Hrbek	293
181	Pat Burrell	292
	Rusty Staub	292
183	Craig Biggio*	291
	Jimmy Wynn	291
185	Bobby Abreu	288
	Del Ennis	288
	Bob Johnson	288
	Hank Sauer	288
189	Garret Anderson	287
	Bobby Bonilla	287
	Brian Giles	287
	Matt Kemp	287
	Bernie Williams	287
194	Carlos Peña	286
	Frank Thomas	286
196	Will Clark	284
	Eric Karros	284
	Ryan Zimmerman	284
199	Ken Boyer	282
	Eric Davis	282
	Adam Jones	282
	Brian McCann	282
	Ryne Sandberg*	282
204	Paul O'Neill	281
205	Josh Donaldson	279
	Ted Kluszewski	279
207	Mike Cameron	278
	Ryan Klesko	278
209	Rudy York	277
210	Brian Downing	275
	Roger Maris	275
	Dean Palmer	275
	Jorge Posada	275
214	Dante Bichette	274
215	Larry Doby*	273
216	**Rafael Devers (0)**	272
	Steve Garvey	272
218	**Jose Altuve (0)**	271
	Tom Brunansky	271
	Raúl Mondesí	271
	Hanley Ramírez	271
	George Scott	271
	**Juan Soto (0)**	271
224	Vernon Wells	270
225	Joe Morgan*	268

Rank	Player (2027 HRs)	HR
	Brooks Robinson*	268
	**Marcus Semien (0)**	268
	Gorman Thomas	268
229	George Hendrick	267
	Mike Napoli	267
231	Vic Wertz	266
232	George Bell	265
	Matt Stairs	265
234	Bobby Thomson	264
235	José Abreu	263
236	Danny Tartabull	262
237	Roy Campanella*	261
238	Eric Chavez	260
	Derek Jeter*	260
	Javy López	260
	Tim Wallach	260
242	Chase Utley	259
243	Ian Kinsler	257
244	Bob Allison	256
	Larry Parrish	256
	Vada Pinson	256
247	Kirk Gibson	255
	Adam LaRoche	255
	John Mayberry	255
	John Olerud	255
251	**Nick Castellanos (0)**	254
252	Joe Gordon*	253
	Andre Thornton	253
	Todd Zeile	253
255	Bret Boone	252
	Bobby Murcer	252
	Joe Torre*	252
258	Tony Armas	251
	Tony Clark	251
	Cy Williams	251
	Robin Yount*	251
262	José Valentín	249
263	Goose Goslin*	248
	Ted Simmons*	248
265	Justin Morneau	247
	Vern Stephens	247
267	Víctor Martínez	246
	Ken Singleton	246
269	Deron Johnson	245
	Nick Swisher	245
	Mickey Tettleton	245
	**Christian Yelich (0)**	245
273	**Joc Pederson (0)**	244
	Hunter Pence	244
	Lou Whitaker	244
	Hack Wilson*	244
277	**Max Muncy (0)**	243
278	Dusty Baker	242
	Sal Bando	242
	**Cody Bellinger (0)**	242
	Wally Berger	242
	J. D. Drew	242
	Aubrey Huff	242
	Kyle Seager	242
	David Wright	242
286	Jesse Barfield	241
	Cecil Cooper	241
	Rick Monday	241
	**Corey Seager (0)**	241
290	Jeff Burroughs	240
	Roberto Clemente*	240
292	Dolph Camilli	239
	Ken Caminiti	239
294	Earl Averill*	238
	Ray Lankford	238
296	**Alex Bregman (0)**	237
	Doug DeCinces	237
	Gus Zernial	237
299	Gabby Hartnett*	236
300	Johnny Damon	235
	Bill Nicholson	235
	Ben Oglivie	235
	Dan Uggla	235

== See also ==
- 500 home run club
- 600 home run club
- List of Major League Baseball annual home run leaders
- List of Major League Baseball progressive career home runs leaders
- List of Major League Baseball single-game home run leaders
