= 500 home run club =

Group of Major League Baseball batters

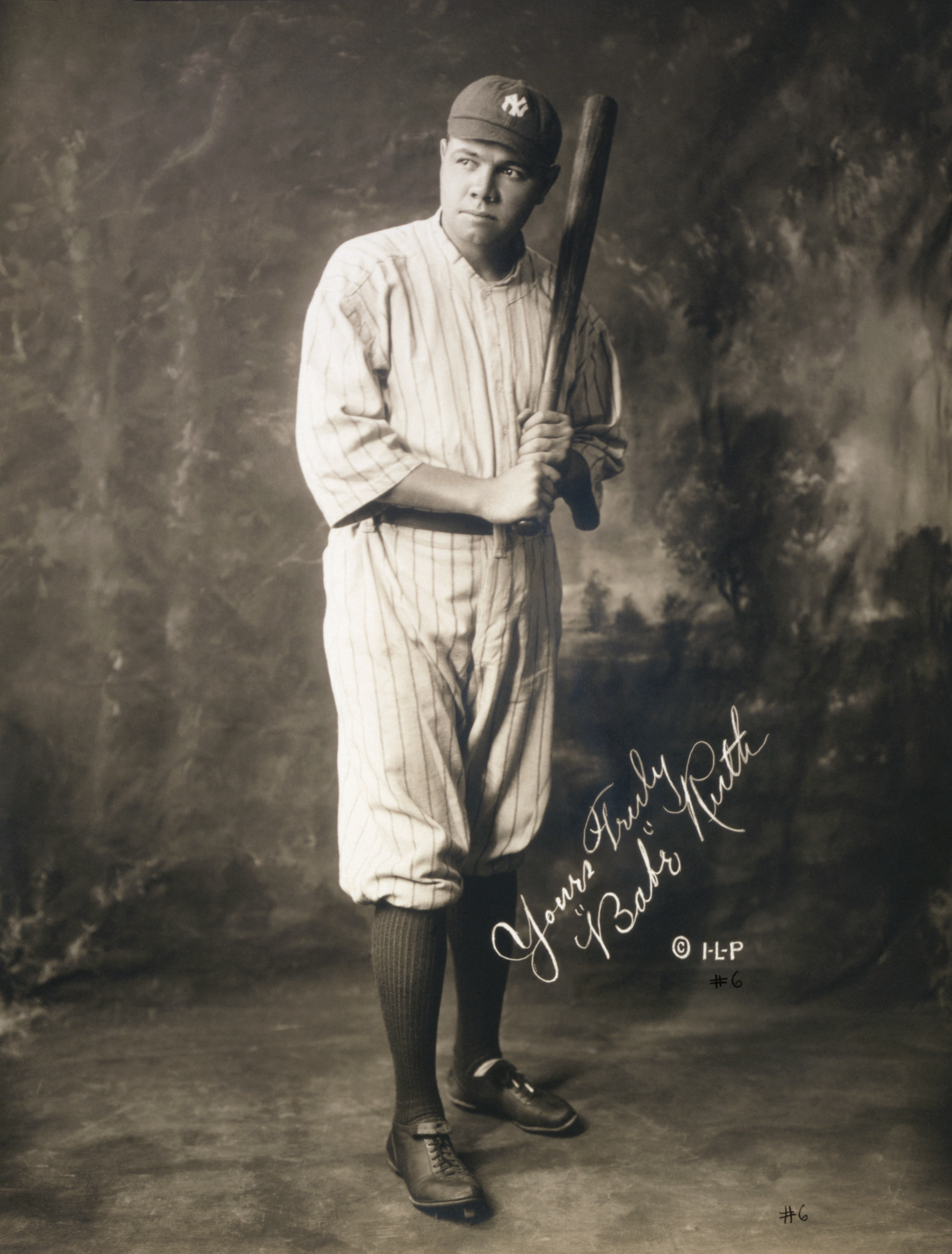
Babe Ruth was the first player to reach 500 home runs and set a career home run mark of 714 that stood until 1974.

In Major League Baseball (MLB), the 500 home run club is a group of batters who have hit 500 or more regular-season home runs in their careers. There are twenty-eight players who are members of the 500 home run club. Seven 500 home run club members—Hank Aaron, Willie Mays, Eddie Murray, Rafael Palmeiro, Albert Pujols, Alex Rodriguez and Miguel Cabrera—are also members of the 3,000 hit club.

In the past, membership in the 500 home run club was a guarantee of eventual entry into the Baseball Hall of Fame, although some believe the milestone has become less meaningful in recent years and many members have not been enshrined in Cooperstown.

All 15 players who became members of the 500 home run club between 1929 and 1996 are members of the Hall of Fame. Of the 11 players who made the 500 homer club between 1999 and 2015 who are Hall of Fame eligible, only four have been enshrined in Cooperstown. Seven eligible club members—Barry Bonds, Alex Rodriguez, Mark McGwire, Palmeiro, Manny Ramirez, Gary Sheffield and Sammy Sosa—have not been elected to the Hall. Bonds is one of only four members in the 700 home run club and Rodriguez and Sosa are members of the 600 home run club, all of whose other members are Hall of Famers except for Albert Pujols, who hit 703 career home runs and is not eligible until 2028.

Bonds and Sosa made their first appearance on the Hall of Fame ballot in 2013; Bonds received only 36.2% and Sosa 12.5% of the total votes, with 75% required for induction. Eligibility requires that a player has "been retired five seasons" or be deceased for at least six months. Some believe the milestone has become less important with the large number of new members; 10 players joined the club from 1999 to 2009. Additionally, several of these recent members - including all seven aforementioned eligible members - have had ties to performance-enhancing drugs. Some believe that by not electing McGwire to the Hall the voters were establishing a "referendum" on how they would treat players from the "Steroid Era". On January 8, 2014, Palmeiro became the first member of the club to be removed from the BBWAA Hall of Fame ballot after failing to appear on at least 5.0% of ballots.

On August 11, 1929, Babe Ruth became the first member of the club. Ruth surpassed Roger Connor's record of 138 career homers during the 1921 season, and was the first player to hit 200, 300, 400, 500, 600 and 700 career home runs. Ruth ended his career with 714 home runs, a record which stood from 1935 until Hank Aaron surpassed it in 1974. Aaron's ultimate career total, 755, remained the record until Barry Bonds set the current mark of 762 during the 2007 season. The most recent player to reach 500 home runs is Miguel Cabrera, who hit his 500th home run on August 22, 2021. Since Cabrera's retirement at the end of the 2023 season, there have been no active members of the club.

== Key ==
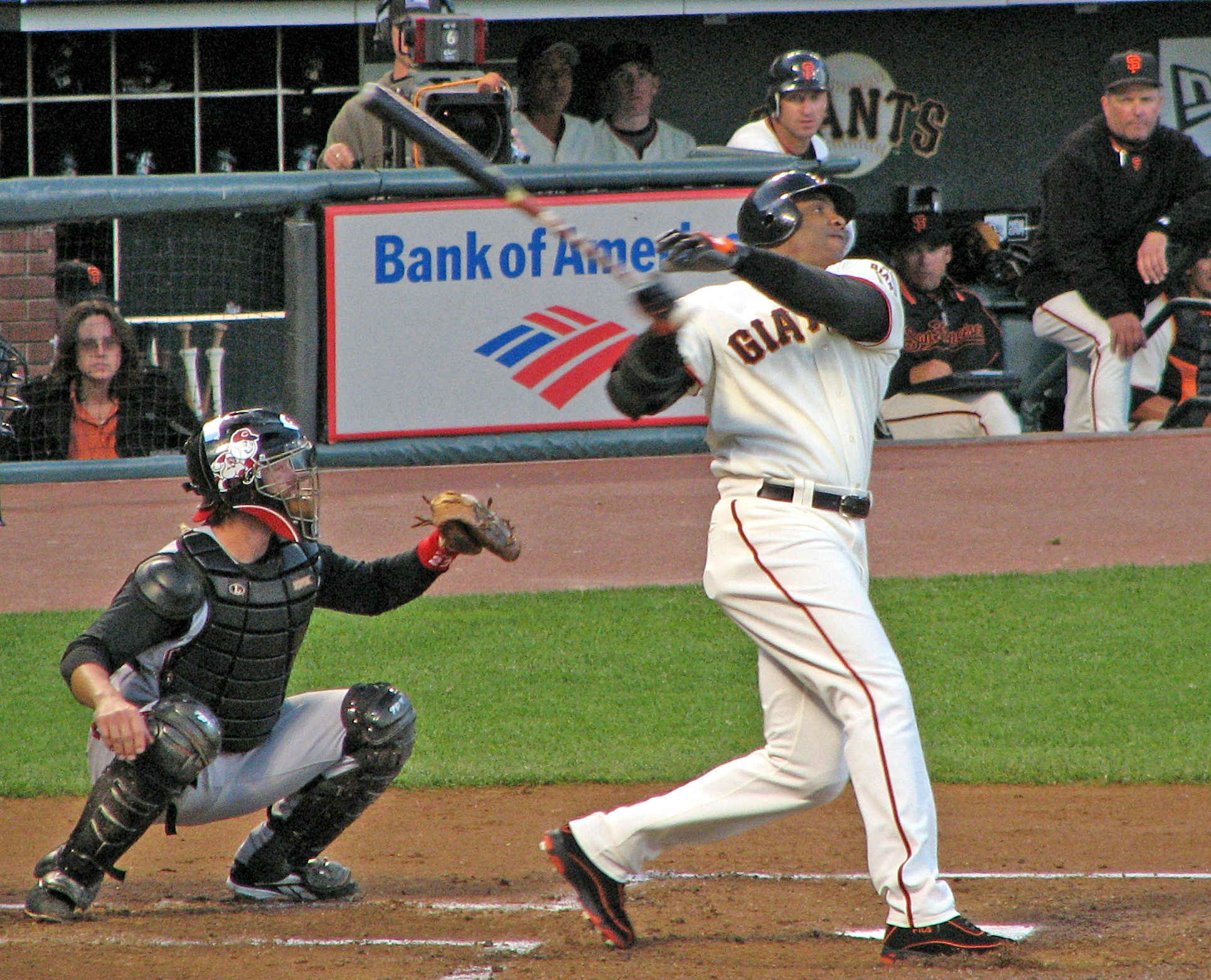
Barry Bonds (pictured here in 2006) joined the 500 home run club in 2001 and set a new career home run record of 762 in 2007.

Player	Name of the player
HR	Career home runs
Date	Date of the player's 500th home run
Team	The batter's team at the time of his 500th home run
Seasons	The seasons this player played in the major leagues
*	Elected to the Baseball Hall of Fame
†	Not yet eligible for Baseball Hall of Fame
‡	Denotes player who is still active

== Members ==
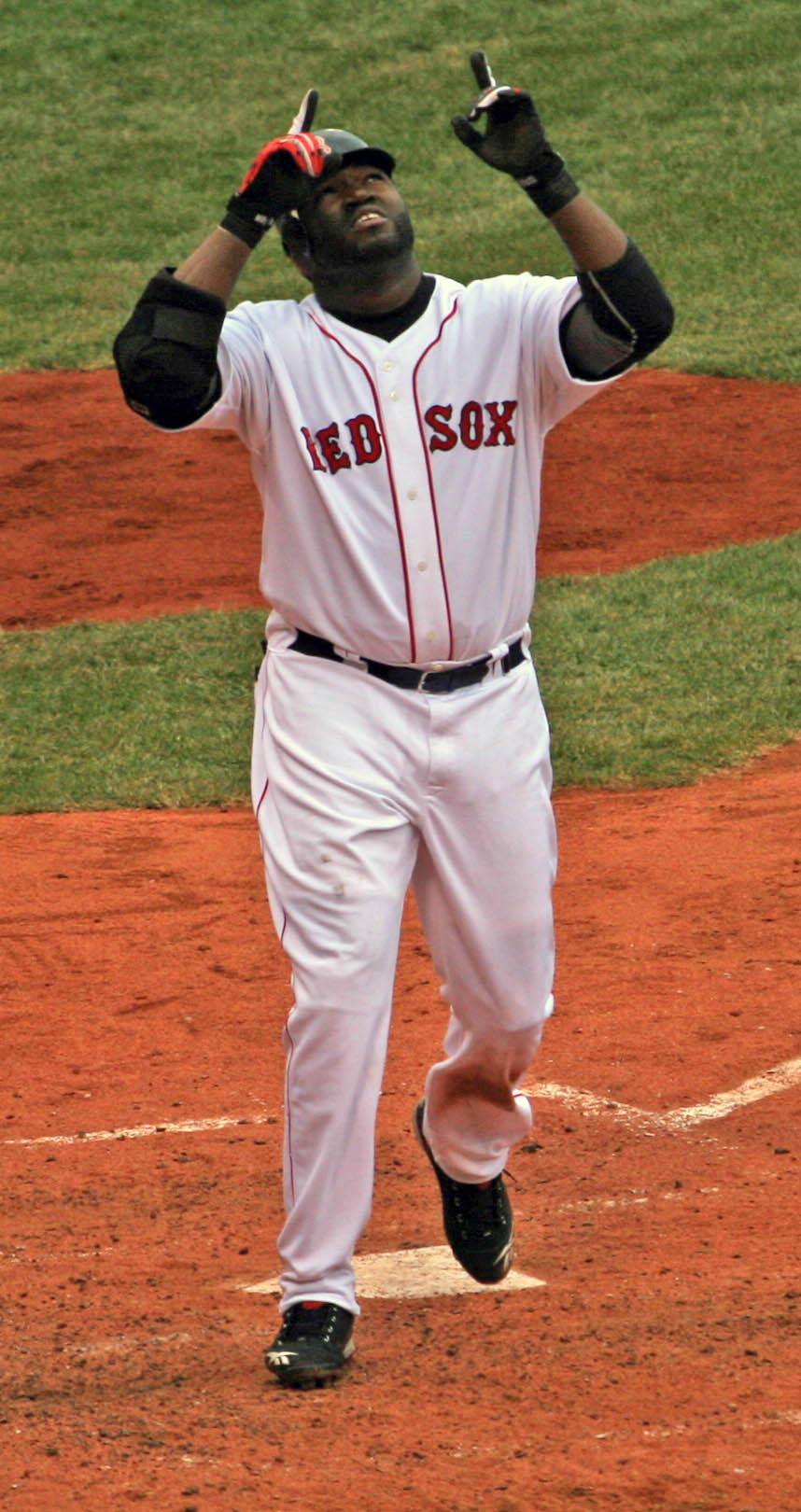
David Ortiz is one of 12 to reach the milestone from 1999 to 2015.

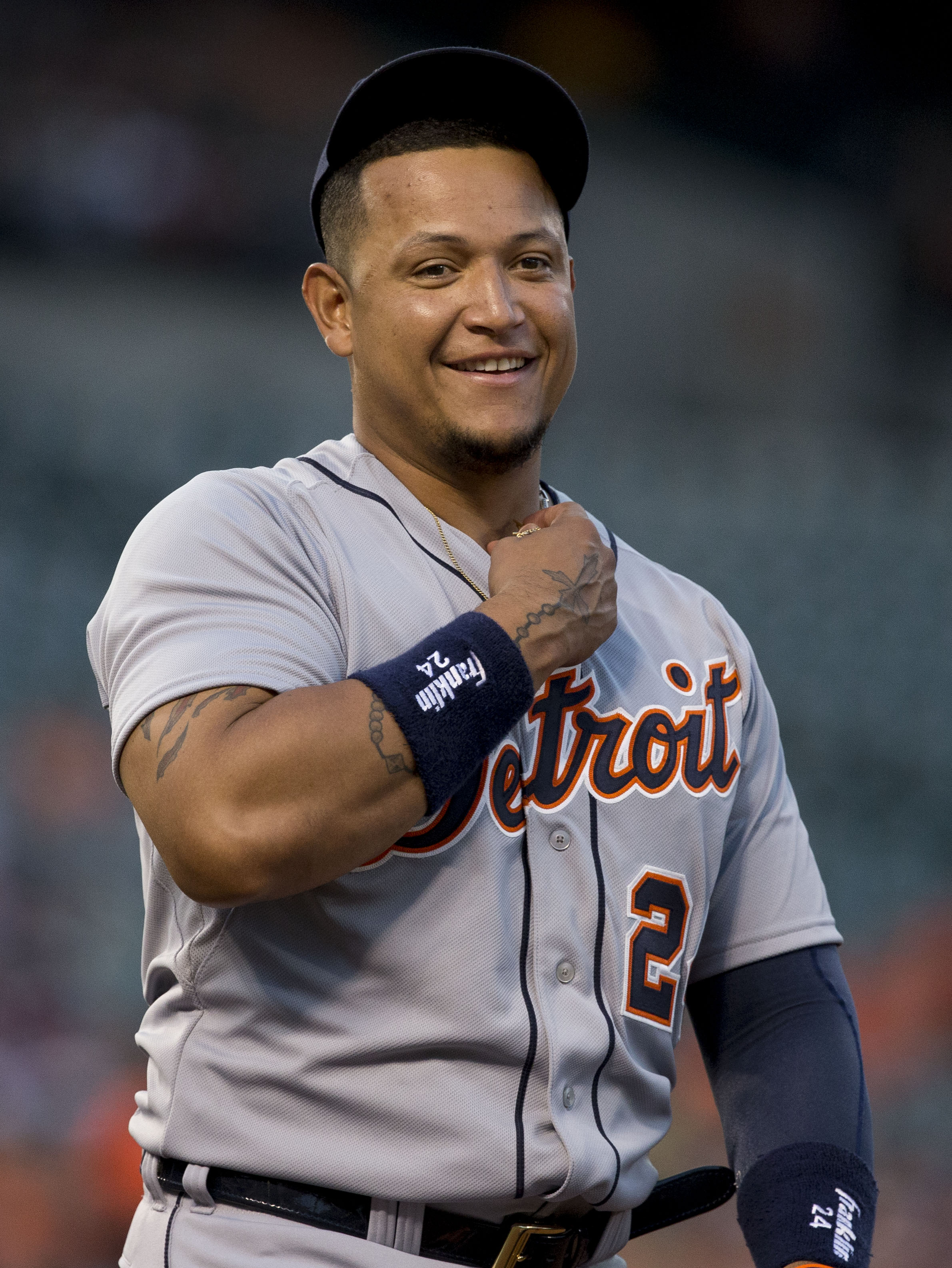
Miguel Cabrera, joining on August 22, 2021, is the most recent addition to the club.

- Stats updated as of the end of the 2024 season.

Player	HR	Date	Team	Seasons played	Opposing pitcher	Ref(s)
Barry Bonds	762	April 17, 2001	San Francisco Giants	1986–2007	Terry Adams	
Hank Aaron*	755	July 14, 1968	Atlanta Braves	1954–1976	Mike McCormick	
Babe Ruth*	714	August 11, 1929	New York Yankees	1914–1935	Willis Hudlin	
Albert Pujols†	703	April 22, 2014	Los Angeles Angels of Anaheim	2001–2022	Taylor Jordan	
Alex Rodriguez	696	August 4, 2007	New York Yankees	1994–2013, 2015–2016	Kyle Davies	
Willie Mays*	660	September 13, 1965	San Francisco Giants	1951–1952, 1954–1973	Don Nottebart	
Ken Griffey Jr.*	630	June 20, 2004	Cincinnati Reds	1989–2010	Matt Morris	
Jim Thome*	612	September 16, 2007	Chicago White Sox	1991–2012	Dustin Moseley	
Sammy Sosa	609	April 4, 2003	Chicago Cubs	1989–2005, 2007	Scott Sullivan	
Frank Robinson*	586	September 13, 1971	Baltimore Orioles	1956–1976	Fred Scherman	
Mark McGwire	583	August 5, 1999	St. Louis Cardinals	1986–2001	Andy Ashby	
Harmon Killebrew*	573	August 10, 1971	Minnesota Twins	1954–1975	Mike Cuellar	
Rafael Palmeiro	569	May 11, 2003	Texas Rangers	1986–2005	Dave Elder	
Reggie Jackson*	563	September 17, 1984	California Angels	1967–1987	Bud Black	
Manny Ramirez	555	May 31, 2008	Boston Red Sox	1993–2011	Chad Bradford	
Mike Schmidt*	548	April 18, 1987	Philadelphia Phillies	1972–1989	Don Robinson	
David Ortiz*	541	September 12, 2015	Boston Red Sox	1997–2016	Matt Moore	
Mickey Mantle*	536	May 14, 1967	New York Yankees	1951–1968	Stu Miller	
Jimmie Foxx*	534	September 24, 1940	Boston Red Sox	1925–1942, 1944–1945	George Caster	
Willie McCovey*	521	June 30, 1978	San Francisco Giants	1959–1980	Jamie Easterly	
Frank Thomas*	521	June 28, 2007	Toronto Blue Jays	1990–2008	Carlos Silva	
Ted Williams*	521	June 17, 1960	Boston Red Sox	1939–1942, 1946–1960	Wynn Hawkins	
Ernie Banks*	512	May 12, 1970	Chicago Cubs	1953–1971	Pat Jarvis	
Eddie Mathews*	512	July 14, 1967	Houston Astros	1952–1968	Juan Marichal	
Mel Ott*	511	August 1, 1945	New York Giants	1926–1947	Johnny Hutchings	
Miguel Cabrera†	511	August 22, 2021	Detroit Tigers	2003–2023	Steven Matz	
Gary Sheffield	509	April 17, 2009	New York Mets	1988–2009	Mitch Stetter	
Eddie Murray*	504	September 6, 1996	Baltimore Orioles	1977–1997	Felipe Lira	

== See also ==
- 600 home run club
- Ted Williams Museum and Hitters Hall of Fame, includes a "500 Homerun Club" exhibit
- List of Major League Baseball career home run leaders
- 3,000 hit club
- The Year Babe Ruth Hit 104 Home Runs, 2007 non-fiction book
