= 600 home run club =

Group of baseball batters

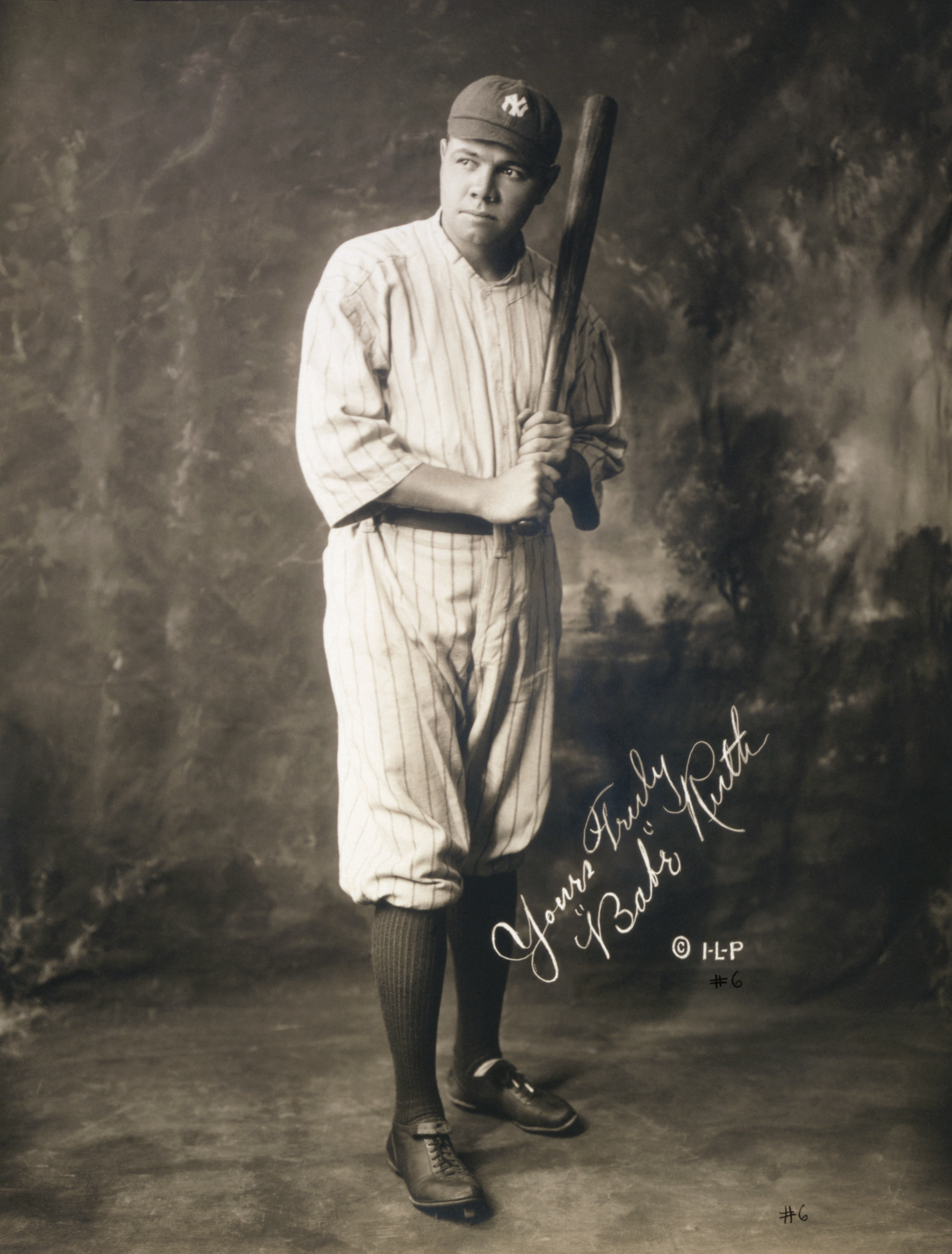
Babe Ruth was the first player to reach 600 home runs. He set a career home run mark of 714 that stood until 1974.

In Major League Baseball (MLB), the 600 home run club is a group of batters who have hit 600 or more regular-season home runs in their careers. Only nine players have qualified. Four of these—Hank Aaron, Willie Mays, Albert Pujols and Alex Rodriguez—are also members of the 3,000 hit club.

== History ==
On August 21, 1931, two years and 10 days after becoming the charter member of the 500 home run club, Babe Ruth hit his 600th career homer in a game in which his New York Yankees defeated the St. Louis Browns 11–7. It took another thirty-eight years for another member to join the club, so rare a feat was hitting 600 career homers.

On September 22, 1969, Willie Mays of the San Francisco Giants hit his 600th home run in a game against the San Diego Padres, an expansion team in its first year of existence. Hank Aaron joined the 600 homer club on April 21, 1971, off of future fellow Hall of Famer Gaylord Perry in a game in which his Atlanta Braves lost to the San Francisco Giants team that included the only other living 600 homer club member, Willie Mays.

For the following 31 years, there were only three members of the 600 home run club, all first-ballot Hall of Famers and three of the greatest legends of the game. Then, Willie Mays' godson, Barry Bonds, joined the 600 homer club on August 9, 2002, as a member of the Giants, hitting a homer off of Pittsburgh Pirates' pitcher Kip Wells.

Bonds made it into the club the season after he set the single-season homer record in all organized baseball, when he hit 73 homers in 2001. (Minor Leaguer Joe Bauman had hit 72 in the Class C Longhorn League in 1954.) On June 20, 2007, Sammy Sosa became the fifth member of the 600 homer club. A long-time member of the Chicago Cubs, Sosa hit his milestone against his former team while a member of the Texas Rangers in an interleague game. Almost a year later, Ken Griffey Jr. joined the club on June 9, 2008, as a Cincinnati Reds player against the Florida Marlins. Three years to the day after Alex Rodriguez of the Yankees became the youngest member of the 500 homer club, he became the youngest player to join the 600th homer club, on August 4, 2010, in a game against the Toronto Blue Jays at Yankees Stadium. A year later, on August 15, 2011, Jim Thome of the Minnesota Twins hit career homers 599 and 600 against the Detroit Tigers. On June 3, 2017, future 700 homer club member Albert Pujols of the Los Angeles Angels hit his 600th homer, a grandslam off of Ervin Santana of the Twins. Pujols became the ninth, and so-far last member of the 600 homer club.

=== Hall of Fame ===
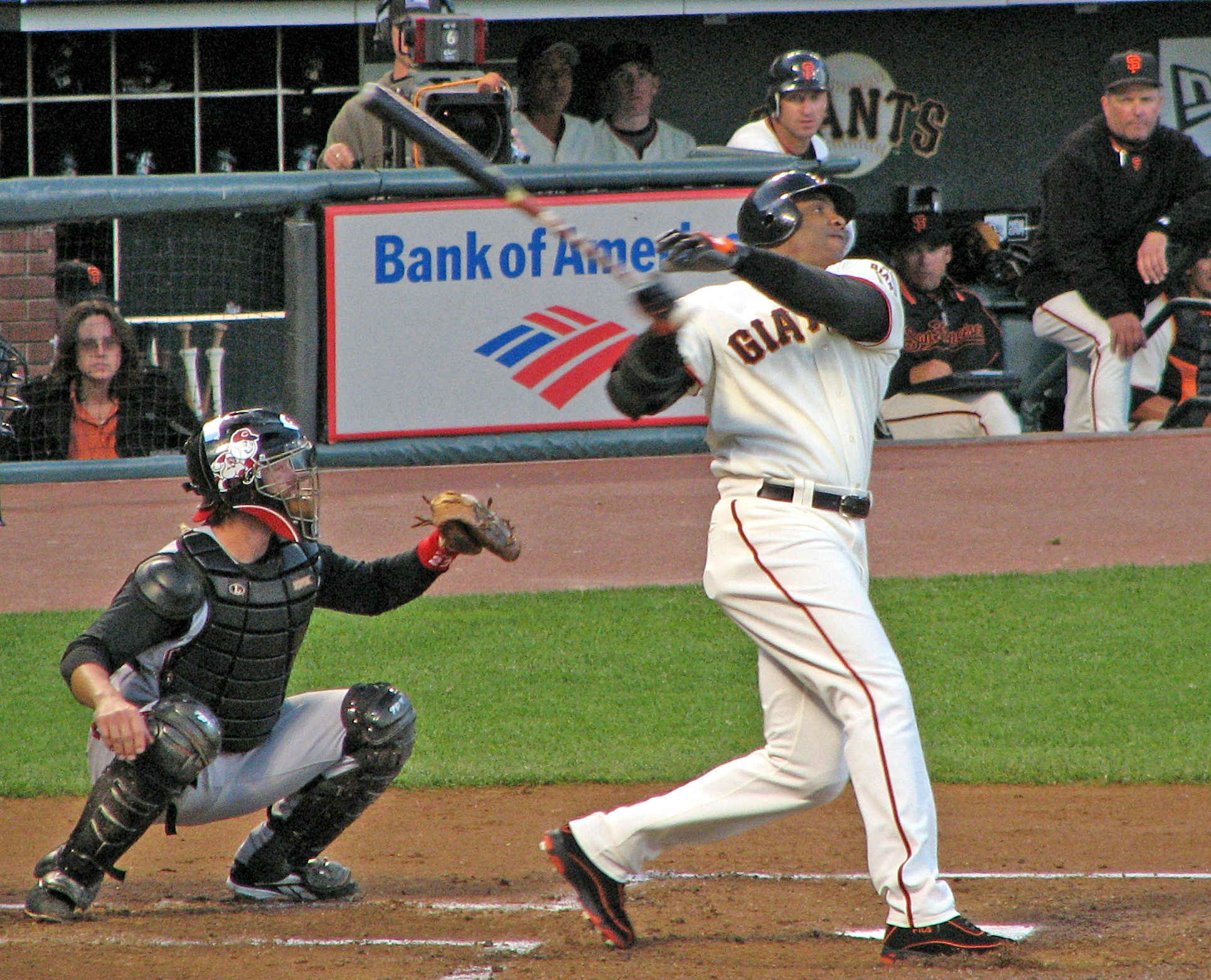
Barry Bonds (pictured here in 2006) joined the 600 home run club in 2002 and set a new career home run record of 762 in 2007.

In the past, membership in the 500 home run club let alone the 600 homer club was a guarantee of eventual entry into the Baseball Hall of Fame.

All three players who became members of the 600 home run club between 1931 and 1971 are members of the Hall of Fame. Of the five players who made the 600 homer club between 2002 and 2011 who are Hall of Fame eligible, three have been enshrined in Cooperstown. Barry Bonds and Sammy Sosa have not been elected to the Hall. Bonds is one of only four members of the 700 home run club; Babe Ruth and Hank Aaron are Hall of Famers, while the recently retired Albert Pujols, who hit 703 career home runs, is not eligible until 2027.

Bonds and Sosa made their first appearance on the Hall of Fame ballot in 2013; Bonds received only 36.2% and Sosa 12.5% of the total votes, with 75% required for induction. Both Bonds and Sosa had ties to performance-enhancing drugs. Eligibility requires that a player has "been retired five seasons" or be deceased for at least six months. Some believe that by not electing Mark McGwire (583 career homers) to the Hall the voters were establishing a "referendum" on how they would treat players from the "Steroid Era".

=== Other milestones ===
Babe Ruth holds the highest batting average (.340) among the club members, while Sammy Sosa holds the lowest (.273).

The New York Yankees and the San Francisco Giants are the only franchises to see two players reach the milestone while on their roster: for the Yankees, Ruth and Rodriguez while Mays and Bonds did it for the Giants.

Two members of the club were born outside of the United States: Sosa and Pujols were both born in the Dominican Republic.

== Members ==
- Stats updated as of end of the 2024 season.

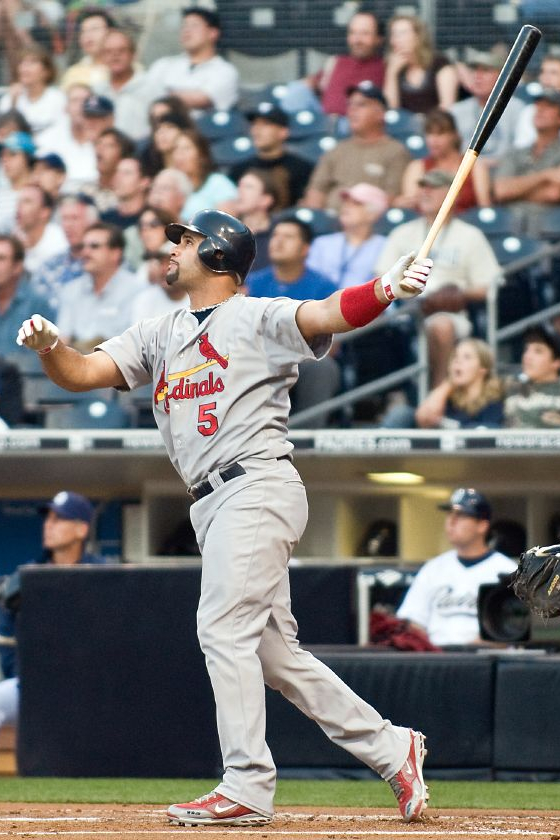
Having joined on June 3, 2017, Albert Pujols is the most recent addition to the club.

Player	HR	Date	Team	Seasons played	Opposing pitcher	Ref(s)
Barry Bonds	762	August 9, 2002	San Francisco Giants	1986–2007	Kip Wells	
Hank Aaron*	755	April 27, 1971	Atlanta Braves	1954–1976	Gaylord Perry	
Babe Ruth*	714	August 21, 1931	New York Yankees	1914–1935	George Blaeholder	
Albert Pujols	703	June 3, 2017	Los Angeles Angels	2001–2022	Ervin Santana	
Alex Rodriguez	696	August 4, 2010	New York Yankees	1994–2013, 2015–2016	Shawn Marcum	
Willie Mays*	660	September 22, 1969	San Francisco Giants	1951–1952, 1954–1973	Mike Corkins	
Ken Griffey Jr.*	630	June 9, 2008	Cincinnati Reds	1989–2010	Mark Hendrickson	
Jim Thome*	612	August 15, 2011	Minnesota Twins	1991–2012	Daniel Schlereth	
Sammy Sosa	609	June 20, 2007	Texas Rangers	1989–2005, 2007	Jason Marquis	

Key
Player	Name of the player
HR	Career home runs
Date	Date of the player's 600th home run
Team	The batter's team at the time of his 600th home run
Seasons	The seasons this player played in the major leagues
*	Elected to the Baseball Hall of Fame
‡	Denotes player who is still active

== 700 home run club ==
Four members of the 600 homer club have gone on to break the 700 home run threshold: Babe Ruth, Hank Aaron, Barry Bonds and Albert Pujols. Alex Rodriguez, who was suspended for 211 games including the entire 2014 season for violating MLB policy on performance-enhancing drugs, came up shy with 696 homers.

Ruth started the 700 homer club on July 13, 1934, and was the sole member for 39 years until Hank Aaron belted his 700th homer on July 21, 1973. They were the exclusive members for another 31 years.

Barry Bonds hit his 700th career home run on September 17, 2004, off of Jake Peavy of the Padres while Albert Pujols became a member of the 700 homer club after hitting two in a game against the Los Angeles Dodgers on September 23, 2022.

== Outside MLB ==
Only three players have over 600 verified career home runs outside of Major League Baseball, all of them having played in Japan's Nippon Professional Baseball (NPB) at some point in their careers. Sadaharu Oh, who played 22 seasons with the Yomiuri Giants from 1959 to 1980, holds the world career home run record with 868, 106 more than Barry Bonds's total in MLB; he hit his 600th home run in the third inning of a May 30, 1974 game against the Hanshin Tigers at Koshien Stadium in Nishinomiya. Katsuya Nomura, the only other member of NPB's 600 home run club, joined Oh almost exactly a year later while with the Nankai Hawks, in the 8th inning of a May 22 game against the Nippon-Ham Fighters at Korakuen Stadium. While not hitting 600 home runs in either individual league, Lee Seung-yuop's combined 626 home runs in NPB and KBO (467 in KBO, 159 in NPB) sets the record for all Korean baseball players and is the only Korean player to hit over 600 home runs.

== See also ==
- List of Major League Baseball career home run leaders
- 500 home run club
- 3,000 hit club
