= List of Major League Baseball statistical clubs =

In Major League Baseball (MLB), a player joins a statistical club when he attains a certain milestone number in a specific statistical category. For milestones that encompass an entire career, batters must achieve 3,000 hits or 500 home runs; pitchers must amass 300 wins or 3,000 strikeouts. A fifth club exists for relief pitchers that have recorded 300 saves over a career. In addition, milestones achieved in a single season include hitting 50 home runs, while three other single-season statistical clubs—the 20–20–20 club, 20–50 club, 30–30 club and 40–40 club — include achievements from multiple statistical categories.

Reaching any one of the four career milestone clubs is often described as a guarantee of eventual entry into the Baseball Hall of Fame.

== See also ==
- Baseball statistics
- Triple Crown
