= 20/70 =

20/70 may refer to:

- Visual acuity
- 20–70 club, baseball feat
