= 20/50 =

20/50 may refer to:

- Visual acuity
- 20–50 club, baseball feat
