= Elly De La Cruz =

Dominican baseball player (born 2002)

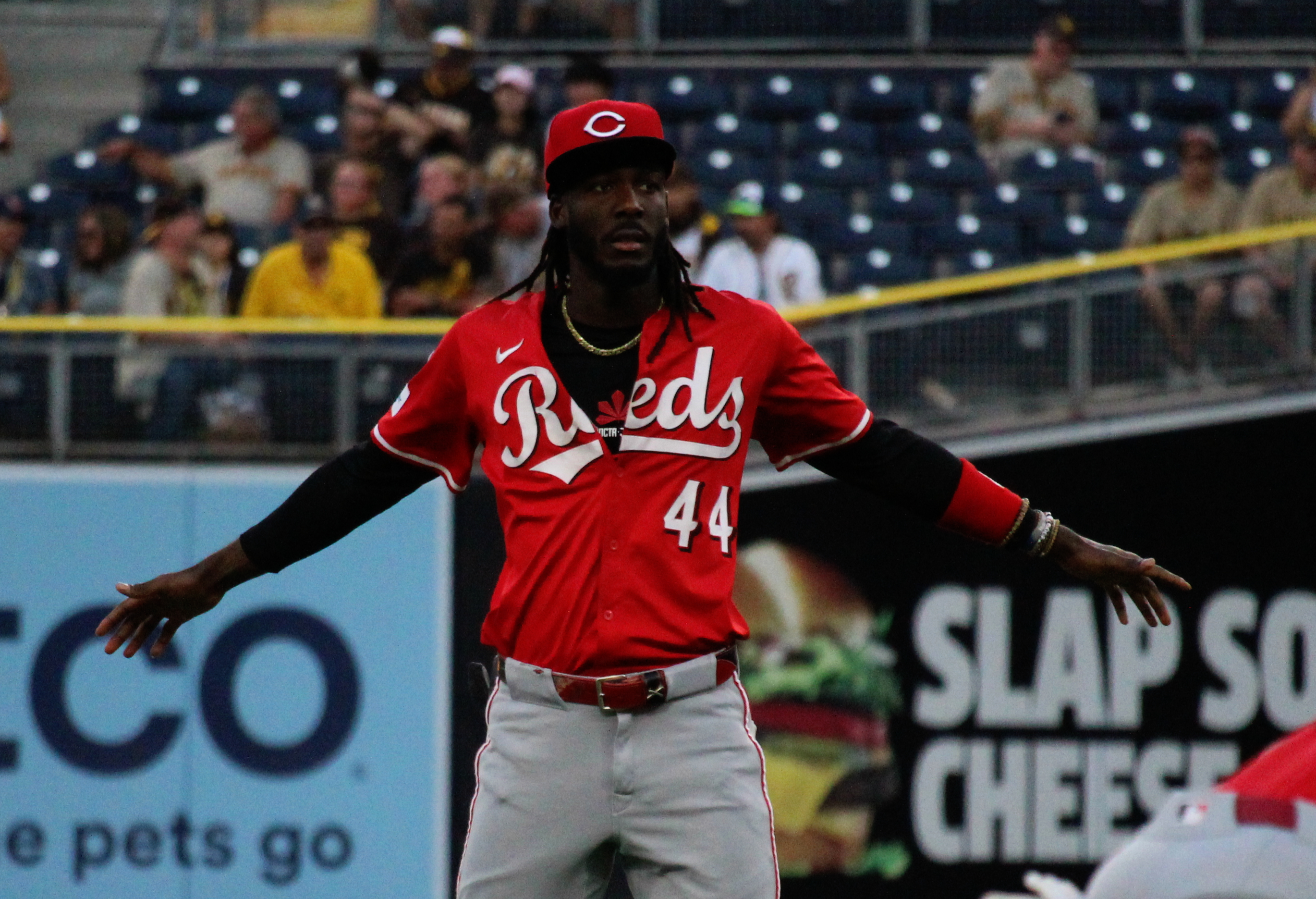
- De La Cruz with the Cincinnati Reds in 2025

Cincinnati Reds – No. 44
- Shortstop
- Born: January 11, 2002 (age 24); Sabana Grande de Boyá, Dominican Republic
- Bats: Switch Throws: Right

MLB debut
- June 6, 2023, for the Cincinnati Reds

MLB statistics (through 2026 season)
- Batting average: .262
- Home runs: 90
- Runs batted in: 285
- Stolen bases: 169
- Stats at Baseball Reference

Teams
- Cincinnati Reds (2023–present)

Career highlights and awards
- 2× All-Star (2024, 2025); Silver Slugger Award (2026); MLB stolen base leader (2024)

Elly Antonio De La Cruz (born January 11, 2002) is a Dominican professional baseball shortstop for the Cincinnati Reds of Major League Baseball (MLB). He signed with the Reds as an international free agent in 2018 and made his MLB debut in 2023. De La Cruz was selected to the 2024 and 2025 MLB All-Star Games. He led the league in stolen bases in 2024 and joined the 30–30 club in 2026.

== Early life ==
De La Cruz grew up in Sabana Grande de Boyá, in the Dominican Republic. He has eight older siblings.

== Professional career ==
=== Minor leagues ===
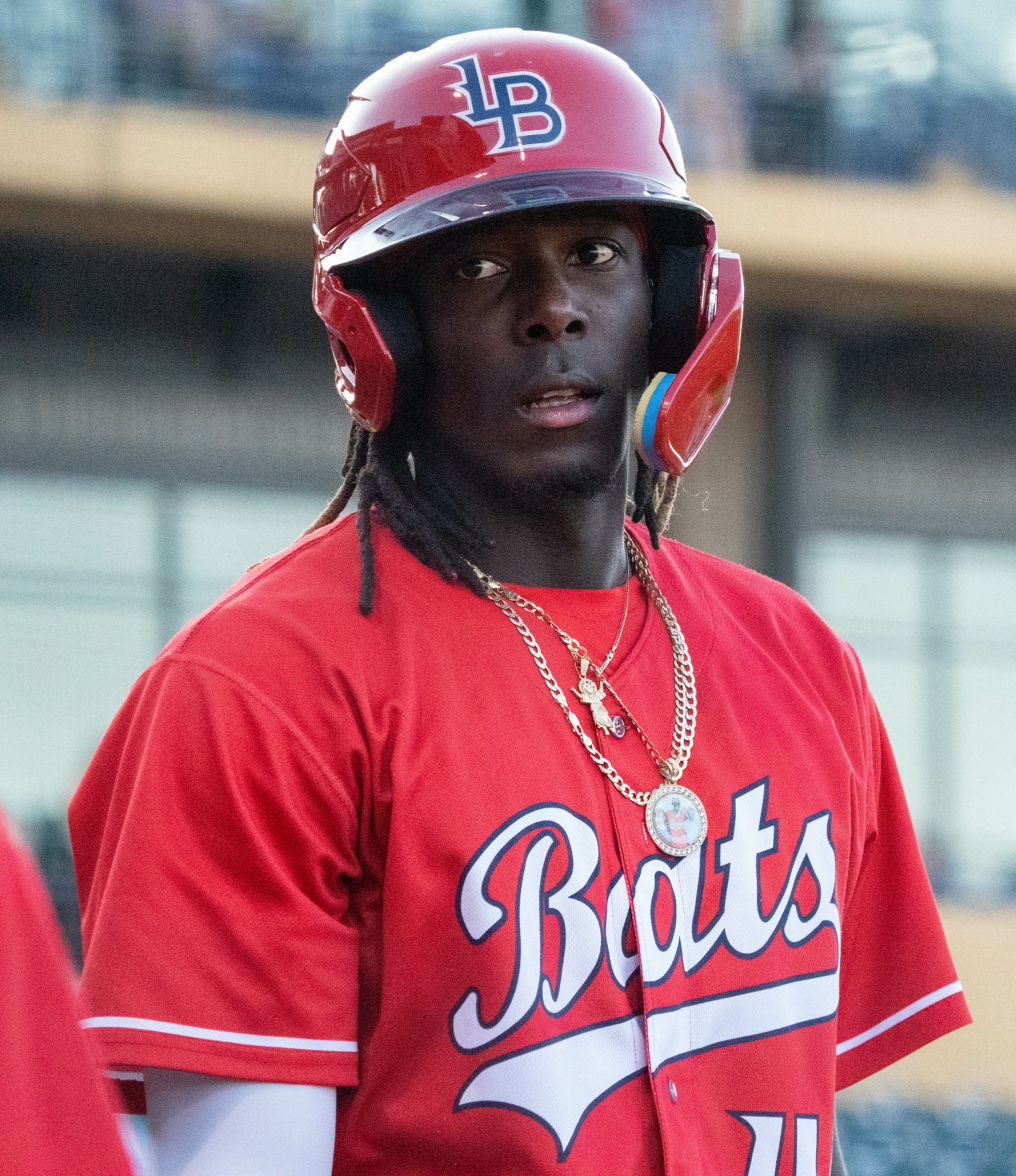
De La Cruz in 2023

On July 2, 2018, De La Cruz signed with the Cincinnati Reds as an international free agent. He received a $65,000 signing bonus. De La Cruz made his professional debut in 2019 with the Dominican Summer League Reds at 17 years of age, hitting .285/.351/.382 with one home run and three steals (while being caught six times) in 43 games, playing primarily shortstop. He did not play in a game in 2020 due to the cancellation of the minor league season because of the COVID-19 pandemic.

In 2021, De La Cruz played for the rookie-level Arizona Complex League Reds and Single-A Daytona Tortugas (with whom his seven triples were second in the Low-A Southeast). He played in 61 games and batting a cumulative .296/.336/.539 with eight home runs, 42 runs batted in (RBIs), and 10 stolen bases (while being caught five times), playing primarily third base. Baseball America named him the best player in the Arizona Complex League, the fourth-best player in the Low-A Southeast League, and the best athlete and fastest baserunner in the Reds' organization.

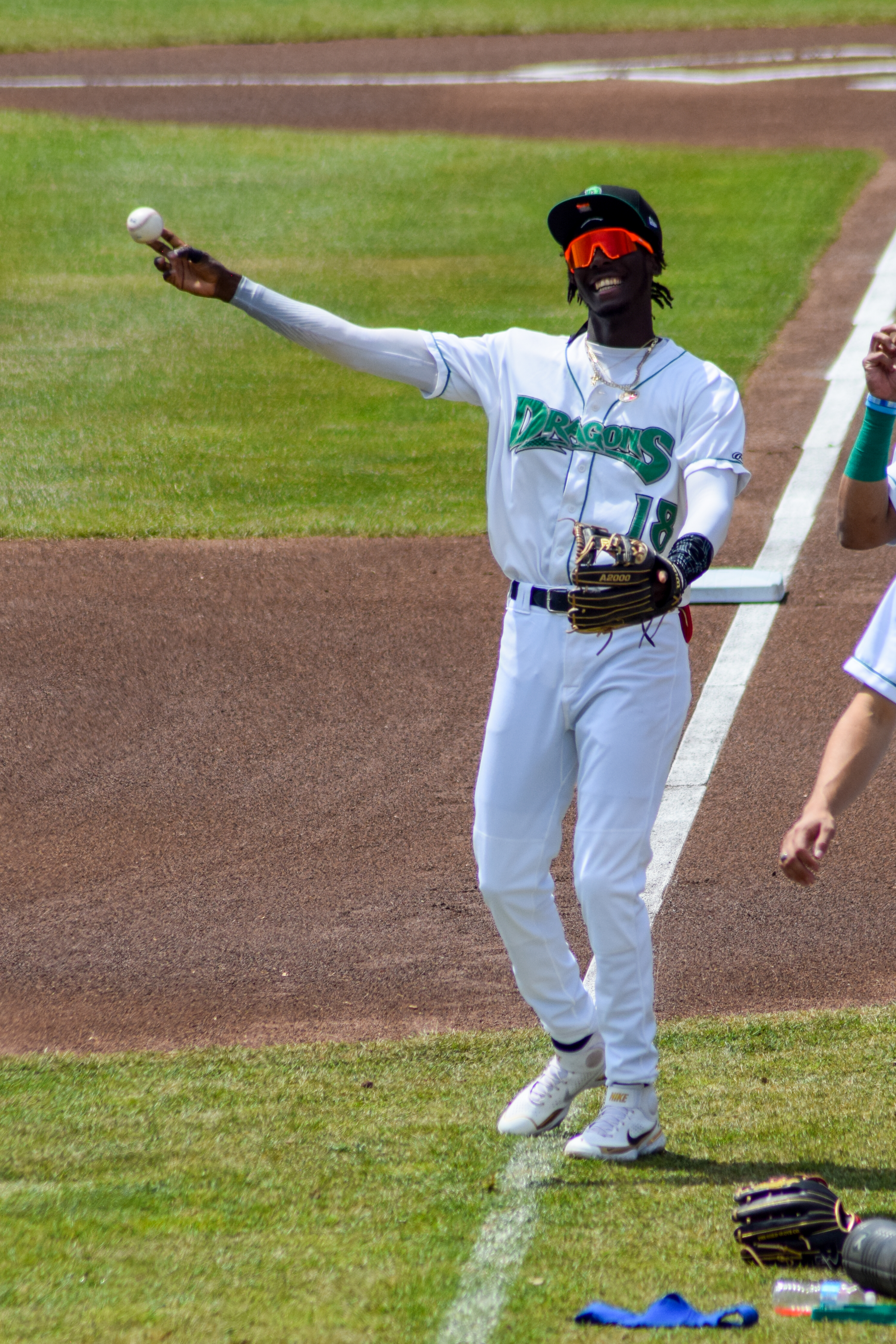
De La Cruz with the Dayton Dragons in 2022

In 2022, De La Cruz played for the High-A Dayton Dragons (where his three triples tied for fourth in the Midwest League) and Double–A Chattanooga Lookouts (where his six triples were eighth in the Southern League, his 20 home runs were second, and his 28 steals tied for fourth). He was chosen to represent the Reds in the All-Star Futures Game. In 121 games, he hit .304/.359/.586 with career–highs in home runs (28), RBIs (86), and stolen bases (47; while being caught six times). He was the first minor league player since George Springer in 2013 to bat .300 with at least 25 home runs and 40 stolen bases. He was a MiLB Organization All-Star, a Midwest League Postseason All-Star, and the Midwest League Prospect of the Year. He was also named the Reds' Minor League Player of the Year, Baseball America's Reds Minor League Player of the Year, and Minor League Baseball's Top Prospect in the Midwest League. Baseball America polled managers who rated him the Midwest League's most exciting player, best batting prospect, best power prospect, and fastest base runner. On November 15, 2022, the Reds added De La Cruz to their 40-man roster to protect him from the Rule 5 draft.

De La Cruz was optioned to the Triple-A Louisville Bats to begin the 2023 season. In 38 games for Louisville, De La Cruz hit .298/.398/.633 with 12 home runs, 36 RBIs, and 11 stolen bases (while being caught six times), playing primarily shortstop.

=== Major leagues ===
==== 2023 ====
On June 6, 2023, De La Cruz was promoted to the major leagues for the first time following an injury to Nick Senzel; De La Cruz was the fifth-youngest NL ballplayer at 21 years of age, one of the tallest shortstops in MLB history at 6 feet 5 inches (1.96 m), and one of the fastest ballplayers in baseball. Teammate Joey Votto said: "He's the best runner I've ever seen, and he has the most power I've ever seen. And he has the strongest arm I've ever seen." On June 7, against the Los Angeles Dodgers he hit his first major league home run, a 458-foot shot. On June 23, he hit for the cycle; he became the first Reds player to do so since Eric Davis in 1989 and the youngest player to do so since César Cedeño in 1972.

On July 8, De La Cruz became the first Reds player since Greasy Neale in 1919 to steal second, third, and home in the same inning. On July 16, he broke the Statcast record for fastest infield assist since at least 2015 with a throw reaching 97.9 miles per hour (157.6 km/h). While he played only 30 games prior to the All-Star Game, his maximum exit velocity was in the 98th percentile in MLB, he was tied for the fastest player in the league (30.4 feet per second (556 m/min) sprint speed), and he had the strongest arm of any infielder (average 95.6 miles per hour (153.9 km/h)). On September 26, he had his first two-home run game of his career.

Statcast tracked De La Cruz and Bobby Witt Jr. of the Kansas City Royals as the fastest players in MLB in terms of sprint speed in 2023: they averaged 30.5 feet per second (558 m/min).

In his rookie season, De La Cruz hit 13 home runs and seven triples in 388 at-bats, while also striking out 144 times towards a .235 batting average. He swiped 35 bases on 43 attempts.

==== 2024 ====
Playing against the Dodgers on May 16, 2024, De La Cruz became the first MLB player since Ichiro Suzuki in 2012 to record four hits and four stolen bases in one game. On July 8, De La Cruz stole his 44th and 45th stolen bases, setting a new record for most stolen bases by a Reds player prior to the All-Star break. The record was previously held by Billy Hamilton, who stole 44 before the All-Star break in 2015.

On July 7, De La Cruz was named as a reserve player in the MLB All-Star Game. On August 21, he became the fifth AL/NL player since 1900 and the first shortstop in major league history to hit at least 20 home runs and steal 60 bases in a season, after stealing a base against the Toronto Blue Jays. He was the third Red to reach the 20–50 club, joining Davis and Joe Morgan.

In his sophomore season, De La Cruz nearly doubled his amount of home runs and stolen bases, with racking up 25 and 67, respectively, from 2023. His slash line statistics (batting average, on-base percentage, and slugging percentage) increased across the board as he had 696 plate appearances in 160 games. He finished 8th in NL MVP voting.

==== 2025 ====
On January 28, 2025, De La Cruz was announced as one of three cover athletes for MLB The Show 25 and became the first Reds player to be a cover athlete for the video game series. On May 11, he became the first player in major league history with 115 extra base hits and 115 stolen bases through his first 300 games since 1900 when he hit a three-run home run against the Houston Astros. On May 23 against the Chicago Cubs with his 300th career hit, De La Cruz reached 300 hits, 150 RBI, and 100 stolen bases in his career in fewer games than any other player since RBI became an official statistic in 1920. He accomplished this in 310 games, breaking the record of 328 games by Hanley Ramírez. On June 1, De La Cruz chose to play against the Cubs after recently learning about the death of his older sister, Genelis De La Cruz Sanchez. He hit a home run in his third at bat and after going around the bases, pointed to the sky and made a heart gesture to pay tribute to his sister. De La Cruz hit a home run in four straight games between June 11–15 for the first time in his career. He joined Eric Davis (1984), Johnny Bench (1970), and Frank Robinson (1959) as the only Reds aged 23 or younger to homer in four consecutive games.

After a strong start to the season, De La Cruz struggled in August and September. After appearing in his second consecutive All-Star Game, he was hitting .285/.363/.489 at the end of July. However, he hit .221/.280/.341 to close out the season, the worst slugging percentage of any months of his career so far. After the season, Reds president of baseball operations Nick Krall revealed De La Cruz played through a strained left quad, which may have contributed to his poor offense and increased errors on defense. Krall said the Reds planned to keep De La Cruz at shortstop.

==== 2026 ====
On June 1, de la Cruz was placed on the injured list for the first time in his career due to a right hamstring strain. He missed three weeks with the injury, and finished the season with career-highs in batting average (.283), on-base percentage (.365), slugging percentage (.515) and OPS (.880). De la Cruz joined the 30–30 club on September 25, with his steal of third base in a game against the Toronto Blue Jays. He joined Brandon Phillips, Barry Larkin, and Eric Davis as the 4th Cincinnati player to accomplish the feat. Baseball America named him to their MLB All-Star team, and he was named to the 2026 All-MLB Team as the second team shortstop.

== International career ==
While De La Cruz was initially expected to represent the Dominican Republic in the 2026 World Baseball Classic, on January 16 De La Cruz confirmed that he would not play in the tournament. The Reds did not grant him permission to participate, wanting him to maintain his health in light of the quadriceps injury he sustained in 2025. De La Cruz maintained that he would like to represent the Dominican at future tournaments.

== Personal life ==
De La Cruz's sister, Genelis, passed away during the 2025 season, on May 31. He chose to play the next day and hit a home run against the Chicago Cubs; he gestured from his heart to the sky after crossing home plate.

== See also ==
- All-Star Futures Game all-time roster
- Cincinnati Reds award winners and league leaders
- List of Major League Baseball annual stolen base leaders
- List of Major League Baseball players to hit for the cycle

Achievements
Preceded by Pete Crow-Armstrong	National League Player of the Month; September 2026	Most recent
Preceded by J. T. Realmuto	Hitting for the cycle June 23, 2023	Succeeded by Jose Altuve
