= 20/60 =

20/60 may refer to:

- Visual acuity
- 20–60 club, baseball feat
