= Cedric Mullins =

American baseball player (born 1994)

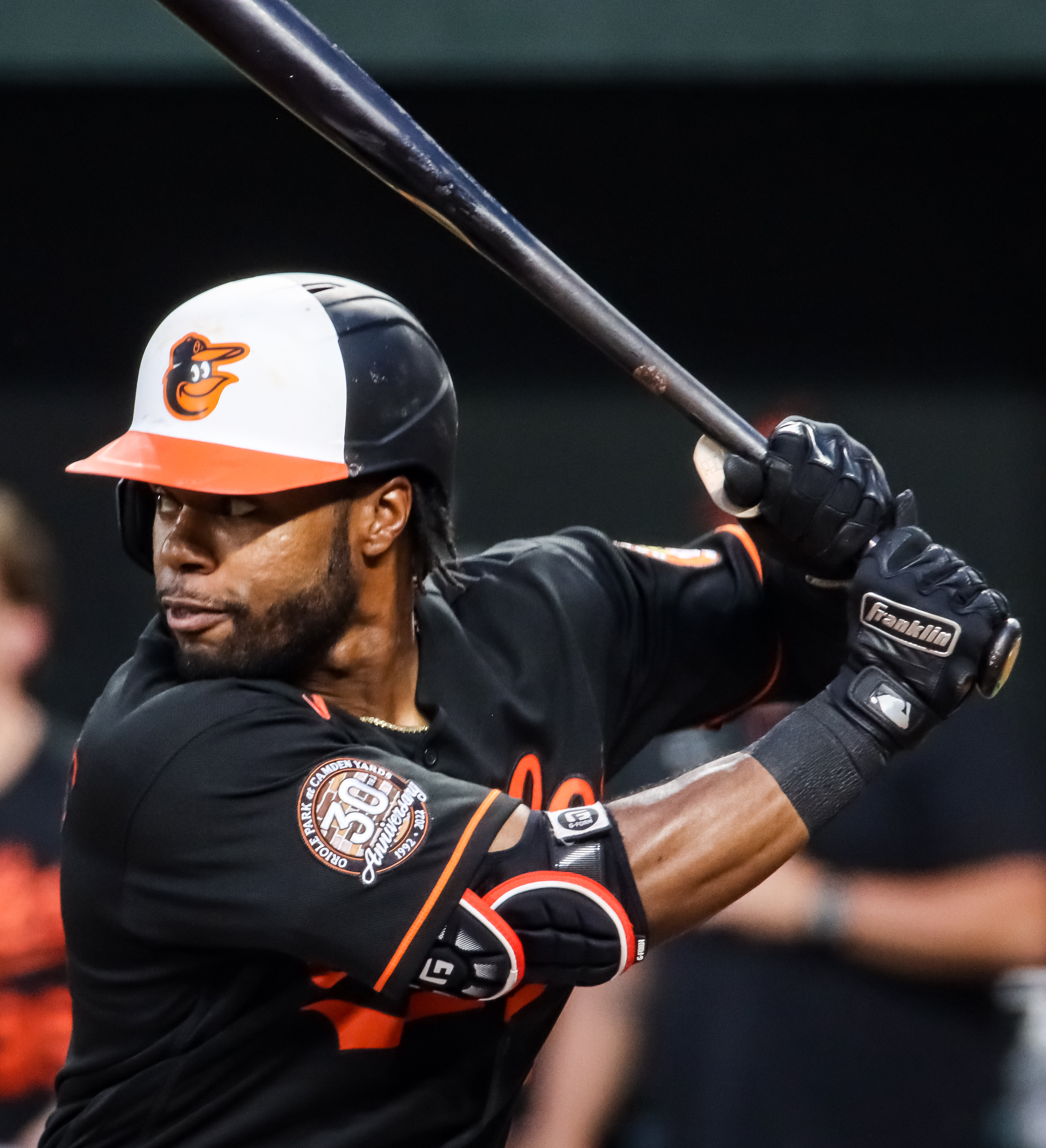
- Mullins with the Baltimore Orioles in 2022

Free agent
- Center fielder
- Born: October 1, 1994 (age 32); Greensboro, North Carolina, U.S.
- Bats: Left (Note: Mullins was originally a switch hitter, but since 2021 he has batted exclusively as a left-handed hitter.) Throws: Left

MLB debut
- August 10, 2018, for the Baltimore Orioles

MLB statistics (through 2026 season)
- Batting average: .241
- Home runs: 118
- Runs batted in: 385
- Stolen bases: 168
- Stats at Baseball Reference

Teams
- Baltimore Orioles (2018–2025); New York Mets (2025); Tampa Bay Rays (2026)

Career highlights and awards
- All-Star (2021); Silver Slugger Award (2021)
Medals
Men's baseball
Representing United States
World Baseball Classic
Silver medal – second place	2023 Miami	Team

Boyce Cedric Mullins II (born October 1, 1994) is an American professional baseball center fielder who is a free agent. He has played in Major League Baseball (MLB) for the Baltimore Orioles, New York Mets, and Tampa Bay Rays. Mullins played college baseball for the Campbell Fighting Camels, and was selected by the Orioles in the 13th round of the 2015 MLB draft. He made his MLB debut in 2018 with the Orioles. In 2021, he was an All-Star, won a Silver Slugger Award, and became the first Oriole to join the 30–30 club.

== Career ==
=== Early career ===
Mullins attended Brookwood High School in Snellville, Georgia. His first two years of college baseball were spent at Louisburg College where he had a perfect 4.0 grade point average and graduated Summa Cum Laude with an Associate of Arts in 2014. He was a one-year letterman in 2015 at Campbell University where he led the Fighting Camels in batting average (.340), runs scored (59), hits (80), doubles (23) and triples (7). Mullins also played in the PGCBL for the Utica Blue Sox.

=== Baltimore Orioles (2015–2025) ===
Mullins was selected by the Baltimore Orioles in the 13th round (403rd overall) of the 2015 Major League Baseball draft.

Mullins made his professional debut with the Low-A Aberdeen IronBirds in 2015, spending the whole season there, posting a .264 batting average with two home runs and 32 RBI in 68 games. He played 2016 with the Single-A Delmarva Shorebirds, batting .273 with 14 home runs, 55 RBI, and 30 stolen bases in 124 games, and spent 2017 with the Double-A Bowie Baysox, where he batted .265 with 13 home runs, 37 RBI, and a .778 OPS in 76 games. He began 2018 with Bowie and was promoted to the Triple-A Norfolk Tides during the season. Somewhere along the way he received the nickname "Parking Lot Ced" for the home runs he hit which left the ballpark entirely.

==== 2018 ====
The Orioles promoted Mullins to the major leagues on August 10, 2018, and he made his major league debut that same night, collecting three hits, two RBI, drawing a walk and scoring three runs in a 19–12 loss to the Boston Red Sox. He became the first Oriole in franchise history to collect three hits in his Major League debut and became only the fifth player in MLB history to score three or more runs and collect two or more extra-base hits in his debut, joining Joey Gallo, J. P. Arencibia, Craig Wilson, and Hall of Famer Willie McCovey. Mullins finished the season with a .235 batting average and four home runs in 45 games played.

==== 2019 ====
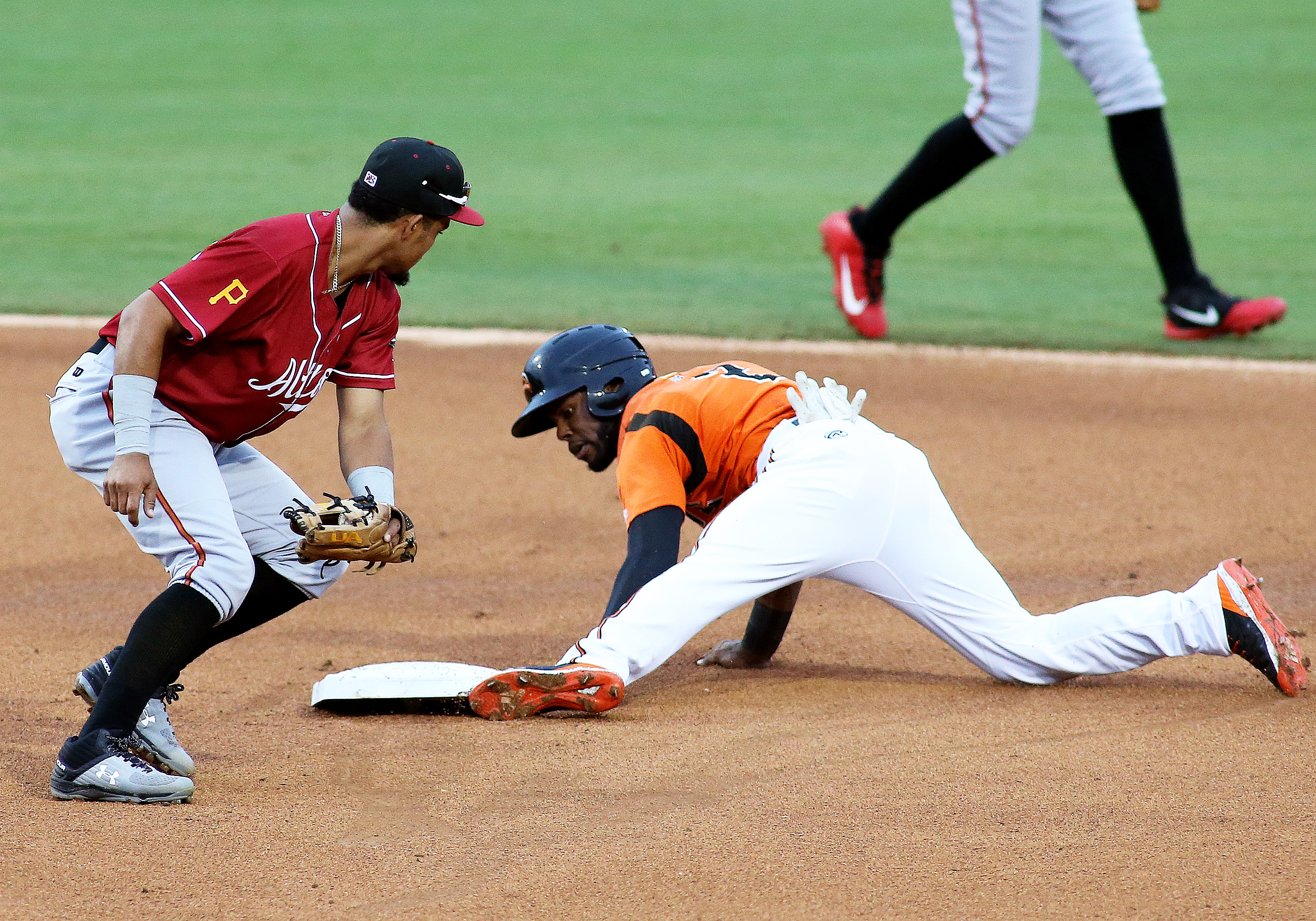
Mullins (right) with the Bowie Baysox after his second demotion in 2019

Mullins began the 2019 season as the Orioles starting center fielder. After struggling to start the season, Mullins was demoted to Triple-A Norfolk on April 22, 2019. Mullins continued to struggle in Norfolk and was demoted to Double-A Bowie on July 10, though Orioles manager Brandon Hyde said the organization still felt "really highly about Cedric and his ability." He would play in Double-A for the remainder of the season.

Mullins ended his season hitting .094 in 64 at bats for Baltimore.

==== 2020 ====
Despite his lost season in 2019, Mullins was able to play his way onto Baltimore's opening day roster in 2020 with a strong camp. In the Covid-shortened 2020 season for the Orioles, Mullins hit for .271/.315/.407 with 3 home runs, 12 RBI, and 7 stolen bases. He disclosed on February 2, 2022, that he was diagnosed with Crohn's disease, and had 10 to 15 centimeters of intestine removed in November 2020 after playing the entire campaign with chronic abdominal pain.

==== 2021 ====
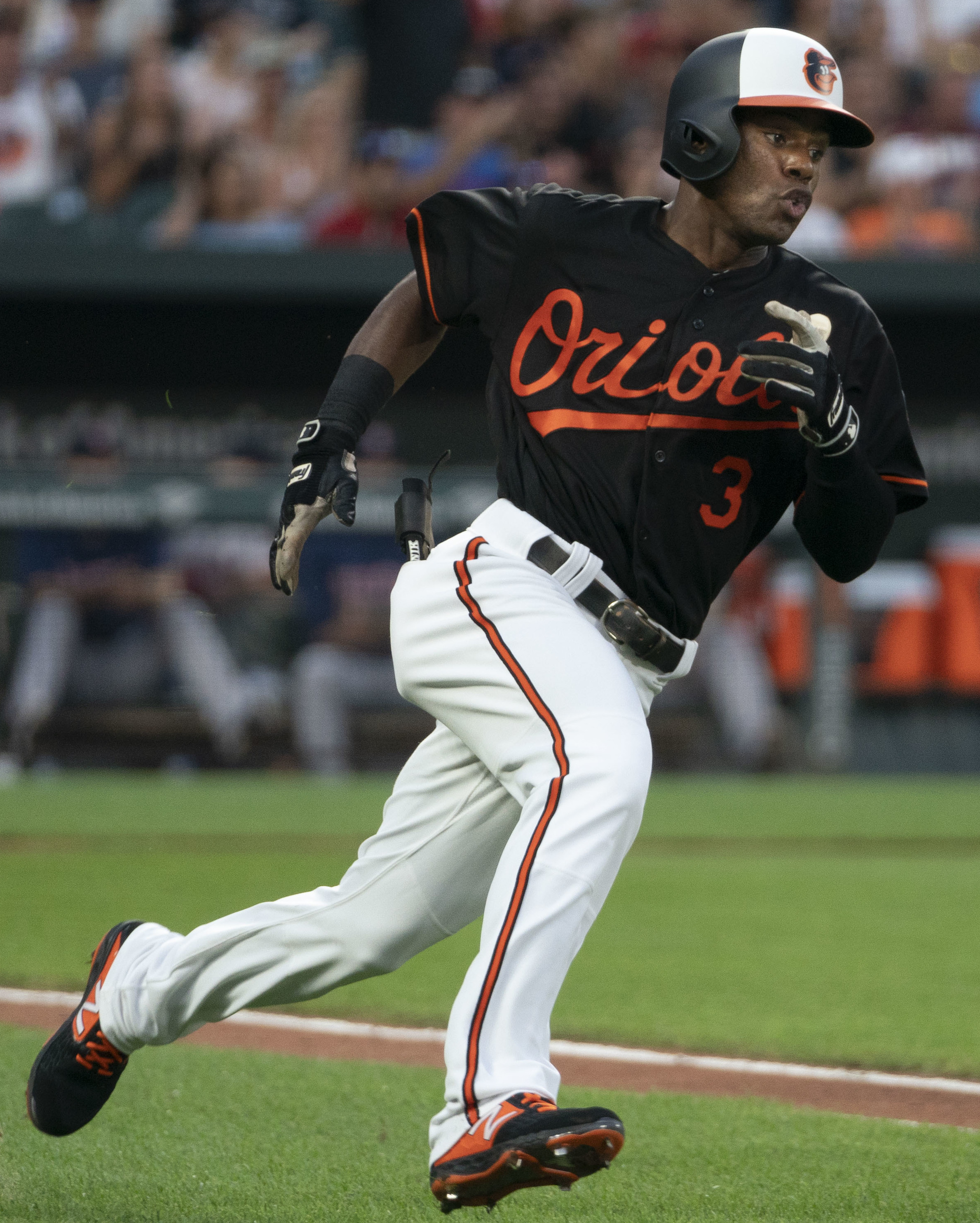
Mullins with the Orioles in 2018

In February 2021, the Orioles announced Mullins would give up switch-hitting and become a full-time left-handed hitter. Mullins first approached the Orioles with the idea in the spring of 2019 but the team opposed it. Before 2021, he had slashed .251/.305/.394 while batting left-handed and .147/.250/.189 from the right side. On April 26, 2021, Mullins had his first career multi-home run game, with two homers against the New York Yankees. From June 4 through June 6, Mullins collected 9 hits in as many at bats including 3 home runs. On July 4, Mullins was named an All-Star for the first time in his career. On July 12, he was chosen to be the starting center fielder in the 2021 All-Star Game, as a replacement for the injured Mike Trout.

On September 24, Mullins became the first Orioles player to hit 30 home runs and steal 30 bases in a season since the franchise moved from St. Louis. For the 2021 season, Mullins slashed .291/.360/.518 with 30 home runs, 59 RBIs, 37 doubles, and 30 stolen bases, and led all major league outfielders with 389 putouts. He was unanimously voted the winner of the 2021 Louis M. Hatter Most Valuable Oriole Award by members of the local media. Mullins finished ninth in the American League MVP balloting. On November 11, 2021, Mullins received his first Silver Slugger Award.

==== 2022 ====
On April 12, 2022, Mullins hit his first career grand slam off of Milwaukee Brewers pitcher Eric Lauer. He ended the 2022 season slashing .258/.318/.403, with 16 home runs, 64 RBIs, and 34 stolen bases. He achieved a 1.000 fielding percentage at center field during the season. On January 13, 2023, he agreed to a one-year, $4.1 million contract with the Orioles for the 2023 season, avoiding salary arbitration.

==== 2023 ====
Mullins was the seventh in Orioles history and second in two years following teammate Austin Hays to hit for the cycle in a 6–3 home victory over the Pittsburgh Pirates on May 12, 2023. He joined Luis Arráez in achieving the feat during the 2023 season. He singled in the 3rd inning, tripled in the 5th, doubled in the 7th and hit a two-out three-run homer to right field off Duane Underwood Jr. in the 8th. Coming off the bench in the 6th inning of his third game after being activated from the injured list, he robbed Ty France of a potential game-tying solo homer in the 9th and hit a one-out two-run shot off Trent Thornton in the tenth of a 5–3 win over the Seattle Mariners at T-Mobile Park on August 13. He hit a one-out grand slam to right-center off Andre Pallante in a 11–5 home win over the St. Louis Cardinals on September 11. His one-out three-run homer to right off Ryan Pressly in the 9th erased a two-run deficit and resulted in an 8–7 away win over the Houston Astros on September 18.

==== 2024 ====
Mullins hit the first walk-off home run of his career on April 17, 2024, against the Minnesota Twins. On July 14, he hit a walk-off double over the head of left fielder Alex Verdugo in the Orioles' comeback victory against the New York Yankees that ended the Orioles' 5-game losing streak going into the All-Star break.

Mullins slashed .234/.305/.405, with a .710 OPS in the 2024 season, with 18 home runs, 54 RBIs, and 32 stolen bases. His fielding percentage in center field was the highest since the 2022 season at .996%. In the American League Wild Card Series against the Kansas City Royals, Mullins scored the only run for the Orioles of the series in Game 2 when he hit a solo home run against Royals pitcher Seth Lugo.

==== 2025 ====
On July 26, 2025, Mullins hit his 100th career home run in an 18–0 win over the Colorado Rockies. With that, he became the third Oriole in franchise history with 100 home runs and 100 steals, joining Brady Anderson and Paul Blair. Mullins played in 91 games for the Orioles in 2025, batting .229/.305/.443 with 15 home runs, 49 RBI, and 14 steals.

=== New York Mets (2025) ===
On July 31, 2025, the Orioles traded Mullins to the New York Mets in exchange for Raimon Gómez, Anthony Nunez, and Chandler Marsh. In 42 appearances for the Mets, Mullins slashed .182/.284/.281 with two home runs, 10 RBI, eight stolen bases, and a .565 OPS.

=== Tampa Bay Rays (2026) ===
On December 6, 2025, Mullins signed a one-year, $7 million contract with the Tampa Bay Rays. On October 30, 2026, the Rays declined their mutual contract option making him a free agent.

== International career ==
On August 21, 2022, Mullins announced that he would join the United States national baseball team in the 2023 World Baseball Classic. He played in 5 games of the 2023 World Baseball Classic and batted .200/.200/.700 with a home run, a triple, and 2 RBI.

== Awards and accomplishments ==
Awards, honors, and exhibition team selections	Times	Dates	References
MLB All-Star	1	2021	
Silver Slugger Award at outfield	1	2021	

== Personal life ==
Mullins first attended two year Louisburg College, then graduated from Campbell University with a degree in business administration. He also enjoys marketing and math, while saying he might have chosen to become an engineer had he not played professional baseball.

Mullins married longtime girlfriend, Erika Hardy, in November 2022. Their daughter was born in December 2023. They also have a dog, Lilo.

Mullins is a fan of anime, with Naruto serving as an inspiration for him in his childhood and professional career.

== Notes ==
Awards and achievements
Preceded by Luis Arráez	Hitting for the cycle May 12, 2023	Succeeded by J. T. Realmuto
