= Eric Davis (baseball) =

American baseball player (born 1962)

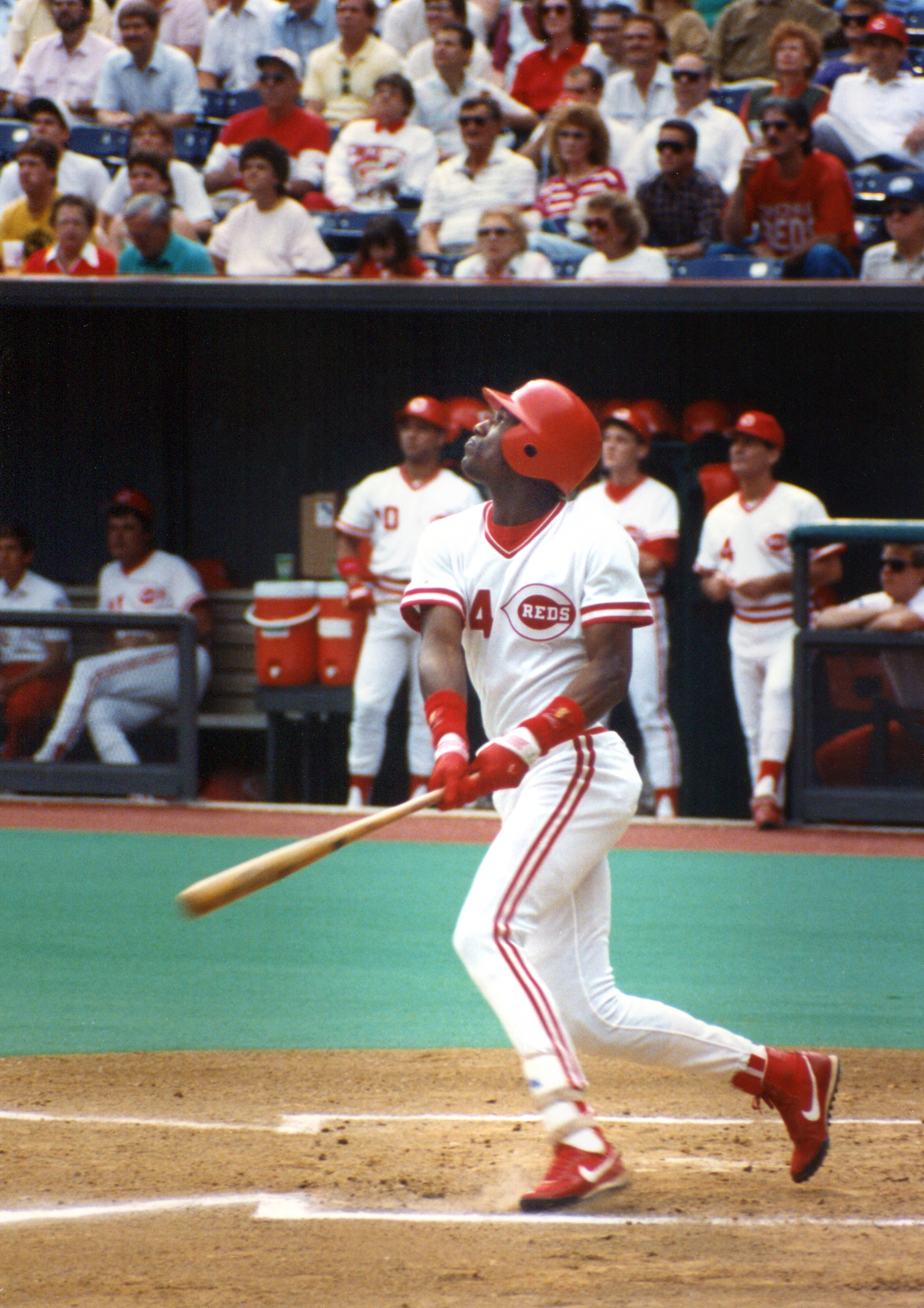
- Outfielder
- Born: May 29, 1962 (age 64); Los Angeles, California, U.S.
- Batted: Right Threw: Right

MLB debut
- May 19, 1984, for the Cincinnati Reds

Last MLB appearance
- October 7, 2001, for the San Francisco Giants

MLB statistics
- Batting average: .269
- Home runs: 282
- Runs batted in: 934
- Stats at Baseball Reference

Teams
- Cincinnati Reds (1984–1991); Los Angeles Dodgers (1992–1993); Detroit Tigers (1993–1994); Cincinnati Reds (1996); Baltimore Orioles (1997–1998); St. Louis Cardinals (1999–2000); San Francisco Giants (2001)

Career highlights and awards
- 2× All-Star (1987, 1989); World Series champion (1990); 3× Gold Glove Award (1987–1989); 2× Silver Slugger Award (1987, 1989); Roberto Clemente Award (1997); Cincinnati Reds Hall of Fame

Eric Keith Davis (born May 29, 1962) is an American former professional baseball center fielder for several Major League Baseball (MLB) teams, most notably the Cincinnati Reds, to which he owes his nickname "Eric the Red." Davis was 21 years old when he made his major league debut with the Reds on May 19, 1984. Davis spent eight seasons with the Reds, on two of which he was named to the National League All-Star Team. He finished inside the top-15 finalists for NL MVP over five consecutive years (1986–90). Vastly diminished by serious injuries, he subsequently played for the Los Angeles Dodgers, Detroit Tigers, Baltimore Orioles, St. Louis Cardinals, and San Francisco Giants. A right-handed batter and fielder, Davis had a rare combination of athletic ability, including foot and bat speed, power, and defensive acumen.

In 1987, he became the first player in major league history to hit three grand slams in one month and the first to achieve at least 30 home runs and 50 stolen bases in the same season. Showcasing his career as one of the greatest power/speed players in MLB history, he is tied for 4th all-time in 20HR/20SB seasons with seven, one ahead of Willie Mays and Hank Aaron.

The Reds selected Davis, a native of Los Angeles, California, in the eighth round of the 1980 amateur draft from John C. Fremont High School in South Los Angeles, where he was a heavily recruited college basketball prospect. In his major league career, he often sustained injuries while winning two MLB All-Star Game selections, three Rawlings Gold Glove Awards and two Silver Slugger Awards. Over a 162-game period spanning June 11, 1986, to July 4, 1987, he batted .308, .406 on-base percentage, .622 slugging percentage with 47 home runs, 149 runs scored, 123 runs batted in (RBI) and 98 stolen bases. In 1990, he became a World Series champion in the Reds' upset and four-game sweep of the Oakland Athletics.

In 1996, Davis successfully restarted his baseball career with the Reds and was named the comeback player of the year. He moved to the Orioles and, despite fighting colon cancer, he had one of his best statistical seasons in 1998. Injuries again slowed Davis over the next few seasons, and he retired for good in 2001.

Along with other business interests, Davis currently works as a roving instructor in the Reds organization.

== Background ==
Eric Keith Davis was born in Los Angeles, California, one of three children, to Jimmy and Shirley Davis. He has one brother named Jim Jr., and one sister named Sharletha. Jimmy worked at a grocery chain in Gardena named Boys Market. He was active with his sons in sports, such as pick-up basketball games. With copious all-round athletic talent, Davis competed with future Los Angeles Lakers player Byron Scott at Baldwin Hills Park and Recreation Center from the age of 12, and he aspired to play in the National Basketball Association (NBA).

While at Baldwin Hills, Davis befriended Darryl Strawberry, and their careers would become intertwined from high school to Major League Baseball (MLB). Davis attended John C. Fremont High School in South Los Angeles where he starred in both basketball and baseball, while Strawberry attended and played for crosstown rival Crenshaw. As a senior, Davis batted .635 and stole 50 bases in 15 games. As a basketball player, he averaged 29 points and 10 assists per game. Steadfast in his goal of playing in the NBA, Davis continued to exert more effort to prepare for a career in basketball than he did in baseball until his senior year of high school. Davis lacked interest in attending college, and because the customary path to an NBA career at the time was by playing in the National Collegiate Athletic Association (NCAA), he decided to focus his aspirations on baseball.

The Cincinnati Reds selected Davis in the eighth round (200th overall) of the 1980 MLB draft. Strawberry was chosen in the same draft as the first overall selection by the New York Mets.

== Early career ==
In his first full year of professional baseball, Davis stole 40 bases in 62 games.

When Davis first appeared in the major leagues in 1984, his physical abilities gave him the potential to be one of the most exciting players in the game. He was a five-tool player with home run power as well as sheer speed on the base paths. He made a habit of robbing home runs and elicited comparisons to Willie Mays.

Davis began to excel in 1986, batting .277 while swatting 27 homers and stealing 80 bases to join the 20–50 club. He and Rickey Henderson remain the only players in major league history to be members of the 20–80 club. In a 162-game span (June 11, 1986 – July 4, 1987) he made 659 plate appearance and batted .308/.406/.622 with 47 homers, 149 runs, 123 RBI, and 98 stolen bases. (He was caught stealing just 12 times.)

Davis continued to build on his success in 1987. On Opening Day, he went 3–for–3 with a home run, a stolen base, and two walks. Through the first 10 games, he was batting .526 with 4 home runs and 8 stolen bases. On May 1, 1987, he hit 2 home runs, including a grand slam. Two days later, he hit another three home runs—one each to left, center, and right field—including a grand slam, and a stolen base. He hit another grand slam that month, making him the first player in history to hit three in one month. During an eventful play in the late innings at Wrigley Field on September 4, Davis crashed into the outfield brick wall as he caught a deep fly ball; he lay on the ground for several moments and was slowed afterward.

Davis finished the 1987 season with a .293 average, 37 homers, and 50 steals. He became the first player in history to hit 30 homers and steal 50 bases in a season, despite playing in only 129 games. Prior to 1987, just six players had achieved the 30–30 club. That season, three others—including Strawberry, Joe Carter, and Howard Johnson—joined Davis in the 30–30 club. He led the league in power-speed number (42.53) with a mark that is the third-highest single season mark ever.

From 1986 to 1990, Davis averaged 30 home runs and 40 stolen bases. During this time, he was one of the game's most exciting players and a very visible superstar player. He drew some MVP support every year from 1986 to 1990, finishing in the top 15 in the voting every year. From 1986 to 1989, he also finished in the NL's top 10 in home runs, slugging percentage, and OPS each year. On June 2, 1989, Davis hit for the cycle at home in Riverfront Stadium. While he had some other good seasons later in his career, injuries prevented him from reaching this type of peak again. In 1990, with a solid team around him, Davis was a key player in Cincinnati's "wire-to-wire" championship season.

One of Davis' most famous moments was when he homered off Oakland's Dave Stewart in his first World Series at bat in 1990. The home run triggered a World Series sweep for the Reds. While diving for a ball during game 4 of the Series, Davis suffered a lacerated kidney, which required surgery. He also underwent off-season surgery on a knee that he had injured earlier in the season.

After 1990, Davis was unable to get his career back on track. Injuries sabotaged his play in 1991, and he was traded to the Los Angeles Dodgers for Tim Belcher and John Wetteland. He suffered several more injuries in 1992 and was largely ineffective.

On August 23, 1993, the Dodgers dealt Davis to the Detroit Tigers for a player to be named later. One week later, the Tigers sent pitcher John DeSilva to the Dodgers to complete the trade. The Tigers had one of the top offenses in 1993 and were seeking to upgrade one of their few weaknesses, the center field position. Davis replaced Milt Cuyler and batted relatively well in 29 games down the stretch with the Tigers; he batted fifth or sixth and finished with an adjusted OPS of 142 and his sixth 20/20 season. Davis was expected to be the Tigers' primary center fielder in 1994, but injuries limited him to just 37 games and batting average of just .183. Following the strike-shortened 1994 season, Davis was granted free agency by the Tigers and chose to retire.

After recuperating for one season, he felt healthy enough to return to baseball with Cincinnati in 1996. He had a solid season with a .287 average and 26 home runs, although injuries cut into his playing time. He had played well enough, however, to convince Baltimore to sign him as a free agent.

== Cancer diagnosis and recovery ==
In May 1997, while in the midst of an impressive start of leading the AL in Batting in April, his numbers began to slump quickly, and soon after Davis was diagnosed with colon cancer. By September, while he was still in treatment, Davis returned to the team. Cancer treatment left him tired, but he worked hard to regain his form and was well enough to hit a game-winning home run in the 1997 American League Championship Series. After the season, he was given the Roberto Clemente Award. He serves as an honorary board member of the Multiple Myeloma Research Foundation.

Davis offered support to Orioles' great Boog Powell who was diagnosed with colon cancer shortly after Davis. Davis and Powell both had surgery by Dr. Keith Lillimoe, and did a series of public service announcements together.

Davis was brought back for 1998 and had one of his best seasons, batting .327 (4th in the AL) and hitting 28 homers (eclipsing 25 HR for the 2nd time in 3 seasons), while finishing in the top 10 in Batting Average, Slugging Percent, On-Base Percent, On-Base Plus Slugging, and Offensive Win Percentage. He also hit in 30 consecutive games that season, the longest streak of the 1998 baseball season, and establishing a Baltimore Orioles record.

== End of playing career and legacy ==
The beginning of the end for Davis's career began in 1999. He spent three injury-plagued seasons with St. Louis and San Francisco before retiring in 2001.

In 1999, Davis wrote his autobiography, Born to Play, in which he credited Pete Rose for having faith in him and teaching him about the game. He also had harsh words for 1996 Reds manager Ray Knight, with whom Davis had had a memorable on-field fight in 1986. He claimed Knight did not support his comeback and did not stand up for him in contract negotiations after the season. Davis remains bitter about the Reds' treatment of him after his World Series injury. Davis was left behind in Oakland after the series and requested that the Reds provide a private plane to bring him back to Cincinnati. Davis claimed that he was refused a number of times and made his own way home after the hospital released him.

According to former Reds teammate Paul O'Neill, Davis was "the best hitter, best runner, best outfielder, best everything" he ever saw.

As of 2017, Davis was a hitting instructor for Elite Development Invitational, in Vero Beach, Florida, and seeks to promote more African American youth participation in baseball.

== Career statistics ==
In 1,626 games over 17 seasons, Davis posted a .269 batting average (1430-for-5321) with 938 runs, 239 doubles, 26 triples, 282 home runs, 934 RBI, 349 stolen bases, 740 bases on balls, .359 on-base percentage and .482 slugging percentage. He finished his career with a .984 fielding percentage playing at all three outfield positions. In 25 postseason games, he hit .192 (14-for-73) with 7 runs, 2 home runs and 12 RBI.

== In popular culture ==
Davis was the childhood idol of comedian Ron Sexton, as well as his most famous character from The Bob and Tom Show, Donnie Baker. Donnie (and Sexton) frequently appeared in character in Davis's #44 Reds jersey, and stated on numerous occasions that Davis was the most complete player he'd ever seen. Donnie claimed to have put a curse on former Reds owner Marge Schott after she "did Eric dirty" following the 1990 World Series. He went on to claim that his alleged curse worked; every April 20, Donnie would begin his 'One Beer Press Conference' with a celebration marking the day Schott sold the team, followed by 'A mandatory moment of silence out of respect for the great Eric Davis.' When arguing with his unseen "neighbor to the north," Tony Mitchell, Donnie told Bob and Tom that he'd "crush Mitchell like Eric Davis crushed fastballs." In real life, Sexton named his first son Eric as a tribute to Davis, and his foundation is named 'You Before Me - 44,' with the 44 being a nod to Davis. The non-profit organization helps comedians struggling with mental health, and also funds baseball scholarships.

== See also ==
- 30–30 club
- Cincinnati Reds award winners and league leaders
- List of athletes on Wheaties boxes
- List of Baltimore Orioles awards
- List of Major League Baseball players to hit for the cycle
- List of Major League Baseball career home run leaders
- List of people from Los Angeles

Awards and achievements
Preceded by Kevin Bass; Steve Sax; Tony Gwynn	National League Player of the Month; July 1986; April & May 1987; August 1988	Succeeded by Dale Murphy; Tony Gwynn; Kevin McReynolds
Preceded by Kelly Gruber	Hitting for the cycle June 2, 1989	Succeeded by Kevin McReynolds
