= Frank Schulte =

American baseball player (1882–1949)

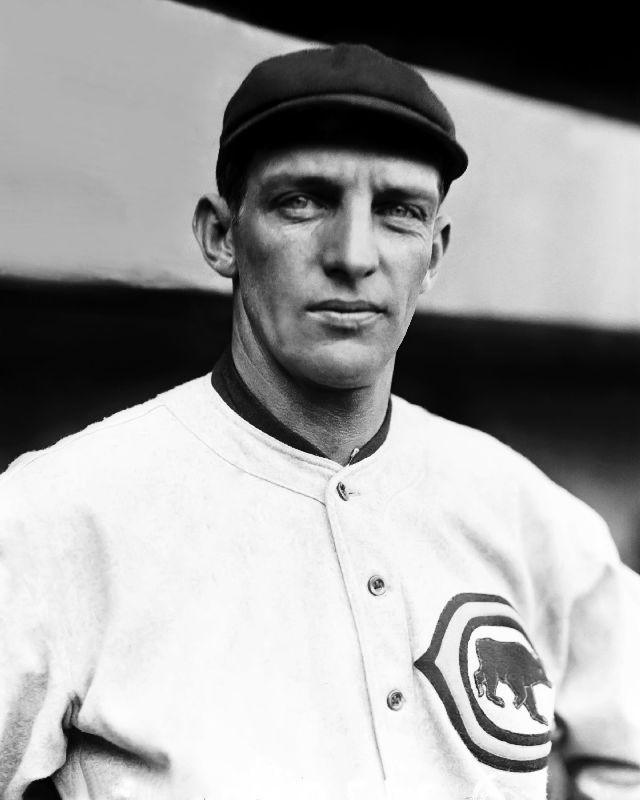
- Schulte with the Chicago Cubs
- Outfielder
- Born: September 17, 1882; Cochecton, New York, U.S.
- Died: October 2, 1949 (aged 67); Oakland, California, U.S.
- Batted: Left Threw: Right

MLB debut
- September 21, 1904, for the Chicago Cubs

Last MLB appearance
- September 2, 1918, for the Washington Senators

MLB statistics
- Batting average: .270
- Home runs: 92
- Runs batted in: 793
- Stats at Baseball Reference

Teams
- Chicago Cubs (1904–1916); Pittsburgh Pirates (1916–1917); Philadelphia Phillies (1917); Washington Senators (1918)

Career highlights and awards
- 2× World Series champion (1907, 1908); NL MVP (1911); 2× NL home run leader (1910, 1911); NL RBI leader (1911); Chicago Cubs Hall of Fame

Frank M. "Wildfire" Schulte (September 17, 1882 – October 2, 1949) was an American outfielder in Major League Baseball (MLB) who played for the Chicago Cubs, Pittsburgh Pirates, Philadelphia Phillies, and Washington Senators from 1904 to 1918. He helped the Cubs win four National League (NL) championships and two World Series.

In 1911, Schulte won the NL Chalmers Award, a precursor to the modern-day MVP award; that year, Schulte had become the first of only four players in history to join the 20–20–20–20 club, hitting 30 doubles, 21 triples, and 21 home runs, and stealing 23 bases.

== Early life and education ==
Schulte was born in Cochecton, New York, in 1882 to German immigrants. He played independent baseball as a teenager, despite his father's opposition to the idea. From 1902 to 1904, he played for the New York State League's Syracuse Stars.

== Major League Baseball career ==
Schulte was acquired by the Chicago Cubs in August 1904.

Schulte made his Major League Baseball debut for the Cubs in September 1904. He played on the Cubs teams that won National League pennants in 1906, 1907, 1908, and 1910. They won the World Series in 1907 and 1908. In his four World Series appearances, Schulte had an overall batting average of .321.

In 1910, Schulte led the NL with 10 home runs. In 1911, he led the NL in home runs (21), runs batted in (107), and slugging percentage (.534). He also became the first player in major league history to have more than 20 doubles, triples, home runs, and stolen bases in a season. The feat was not accomplished again until Willie Mays did it in 1957.

Schulte's 21 home runs was the third-highest season total at that time, behind Ned Williamson with 27 in 1884 (generally considered a fluke due to the ground rules at his home park that year), and Buck Freeman with 25 in 1899. Schulte won the 1911 NL Chalmers Award, making Schulte along with Ty Cobb the first major league players to have been designated Most Valuable Player for a season.

In July 1916, Schulte was traded to the Pittsburgh Pirates. His hitting declined, and he then played for the Philadelphia Phillies and Washington Senators until the 1918 season, his last as a major leaguer.

Schulte played in the International League and Pacific Coast League from 1919 to 1922.

In 1,806 MLB games over 15 seasons, Schulte posted a .270 batting average (1766-for-6533) with 906 runs, 288 doubles, 124 triples, 92 home runs, 793 runs batted in, 233 stolen bases, 545 bases on balls, a .332 on-base percentage, and a .395 slugging percentage. He finished his career with a .966 fielding percentage.

== Personal life ==
Schulte acquired his nickname, "Wildfire", after seeing a play called "Wildfire" in Mississippi. He then named one of his race horses "Wildfire" and was eventually known by that name, as well.

Schulte married his wife, Mabel Kirby, in 1911. He eventually settled in Oakland, California.

== Death ==
Schulte died in Oakland, California on October 2, 1949, at age 67.

== See also ==
- List of Major League Baseball career triples leaders
- List of Major League Baseball annual home run leaders
- List of Major League Baseball annual triples leaders
- List of Major League Baseball annual runs batted in leaders
- List of Major League Baseball single-season triples leaders
- List of National League annual slugging percentage leaders
- 20–20–20 club
