= 40–40 club =

Accomplishment in baseball

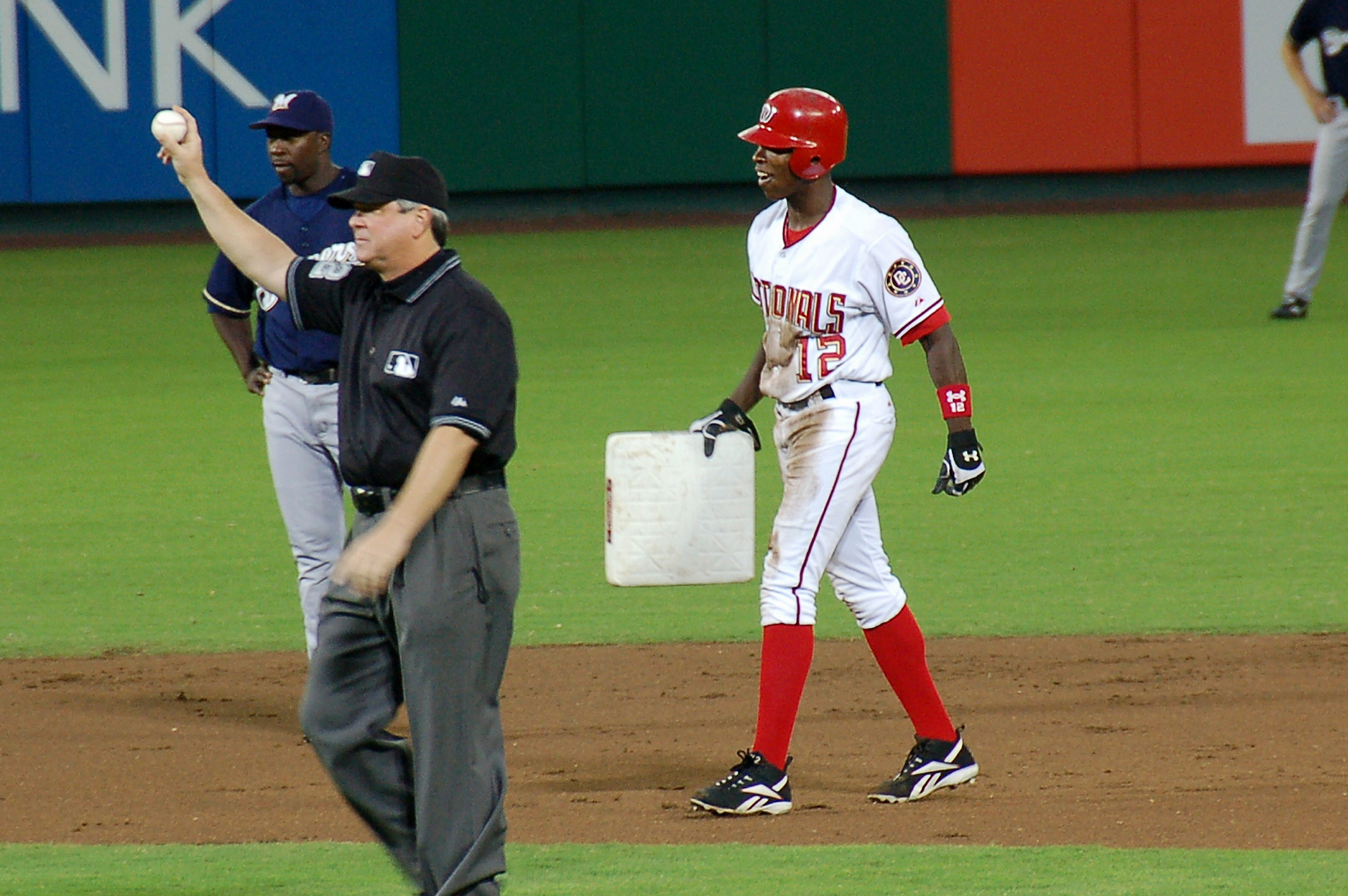
Alfonso Soriano, the fourth player to join the 40–40 club, commemorated the occasion in 2006, against the Milwaukee Brewers, by retrieving the bag from second base after his 40th steal.

In Major League Baseball (MLB), the 40–40 club is the group of batters, currently seven, who have collected 40 home runs and 40 stolen bases in a single season. Very few professional baseball players have possessed the combination of power and speed necessary to reach this milestone, and no MLB player has done so in more than a single season. The seven players to reach the 40–40 plateau for an MLB season are Jose Canseco, Barry Bonds, Alex Rodriguez, Alfonso Soriano, Ronald Acuña Jr., Shohei Ohtani and Pete Crow-Armstrong. Ohtani is the only player to achieve a 50–50 season, having done so in 2024.

== Early history and pioneers ==
The first player to approach the mark was Ken Williams in 1922, with 39 home runs and 37 stolen bases, thus making him the first player to reach the 30–30 club. It took another 30 years for another player to come close to 40–40, as Willie Mays did in 1956 with 36 home runs and 40 stolen bases. In 1973, Bobby Bonds achieved 39–43; he hit a home run in the 1973 MLB All Star Game, which did not count as an official home run.

When Jose Canseco predicted he would reach 40–40 in 1988, he mistakenly assumed "five or six players must have done it." After Canseco became the first player to reach 40–40, Hall of Famer Mickey Mantle was quoted as saying, "Hell, If I'd known 40–40 was going to be a big deal, I'd have done it every year!"

== Members ==
Key
Season	The year the player's 40–40 season occurred
Player (X)	Name of the player (number of 40–40 seasons at that point, if more than one)
HR	Number of home runs in that year
SB	Number of stolen bases in that year
Team	The player's team for his 40–40 season
#	Denotes 50–50 season
†	Elected to the Baseball Hall of Fame
‡	Player is active

Season	Player	HR	SB	Games taken to reach 40–40	Player's team	40–40 game
1988	Jose Canseco	42	40	151	Oakland Athletics	September 23, 1988, vs Milwaukee Brewers, pitcher Juan Nieves
1996	Barry Bonds	42	40	158	San Francisco Giants	September 27, 1996, vs Colorado Rockies, pitcher Armando Reynoso
1998	Alex Rodriguez	42	46	153	Seattle Mariners	September 19, 1998, vs Anaheim Angels, pitcher Jack McDowell
2006	Alfonso Soriano	46	41	147	Washington Nationals	September 16, 2006, vs Milwaukee Brewers, pitcher Dave Bush
2023	Ronald Acuña Jr.^{‡}	41	73	152	Atlanta Braves	September 22, 2023, vs Washington Nationals, pitcher Patrick Corbin
2024	Shohei Ohtani^{‡}	54^{#}	59^{#}	126	Los Angeles Dodgers	August 23, 2024, vs Tampa Bay Rays, pitcher Colin Poche
2026	Pete Crow-Armstrong^{‡}	45	41	159	Chicago Cubs	September 24, 2026 vs Miami Marlins, pitcher Tyler Phillips

Jose Canseco, Barry Bonds, Alfonso Soriano, Ronald Acuña Jr., and Pete Crow-Armstrong were outfielders in their 40–40 seasons, while Alex Rodriguez played shortstop. Shohei Ohtani served as a designated hitter, but did not pitch in his 40–40 season due to an arm injury he suffered in the previous year. Acuña Jr. (41–37 in 2019), Soriano (39–41 in 2002, when playing second base), and Bonds (40–37 in 1997) all came close to having multiple 40–40 seasons. Ohtani hit the most home runs in his 40–40 season, with 54, while Acuña stole the most bases, with 73.

Canseco, Bonds, Soriano, and Crow-Armstrong joined the 40–40 club by stealing their 40th bases, while Rodriguez, Acuña Jr., and Ohtani joined by hitting their 40th home runs. Ohtani is the only player to achieve both in the same game, stealing his 40th base in the fourth inning and then hitting a game-winning, walk-off grand slam in the bottom of the ninth for his 40th home run.

Canseco, Acuña Jr., Ohtani, and Crow-Armstrong all won the Major League Baseball Most Valuable Player Award in their respective leagues in the year of their 40–40 seasons. All four’s teams also reached the MLB playoffs in their 40–40 years, and Ohtani's Dodgers won the World Series in his 50–50 year. Soriano and Crow-Armstrong are the only members of the club to have a batting average below .300 in their respective 40–40 seasons. Soriano also hit 41 doubles during his 40–40 season, making him the only player to achieve that feat. Bonds and Crow-Armstrong are the only players to win a Gold Glove during a 40–40 season. Ohtani is the only pitcher to join the club (although he did not pitch during his 40-40 season due to injury).

As of 2026, Acuña Jr., Ohtani, and Crow-Armstrong are the only active players who have achieved a 40–40 season. All four retired 40–40 club members had at least 400 career home runs and 200 stolen bases in their careers, and Bonds and Rodriguez are also members of the 600 home run club.

No members of the 40–40 club have been elected to the Baseball Hall of Fame. Active players are ineligible for the Hall of Fame, and Soriano fell off the Hall of Fame ballot in his first year of eligibility in 2020. The other retired members of the 40–40 club have been linked to the use of performance-enhancing drugs; Bonds and Canseco were each implicated in the December 2007 Mitchell Report, while Rodriguez admitted in 2009 to using steroids.

== 50–50 club ==
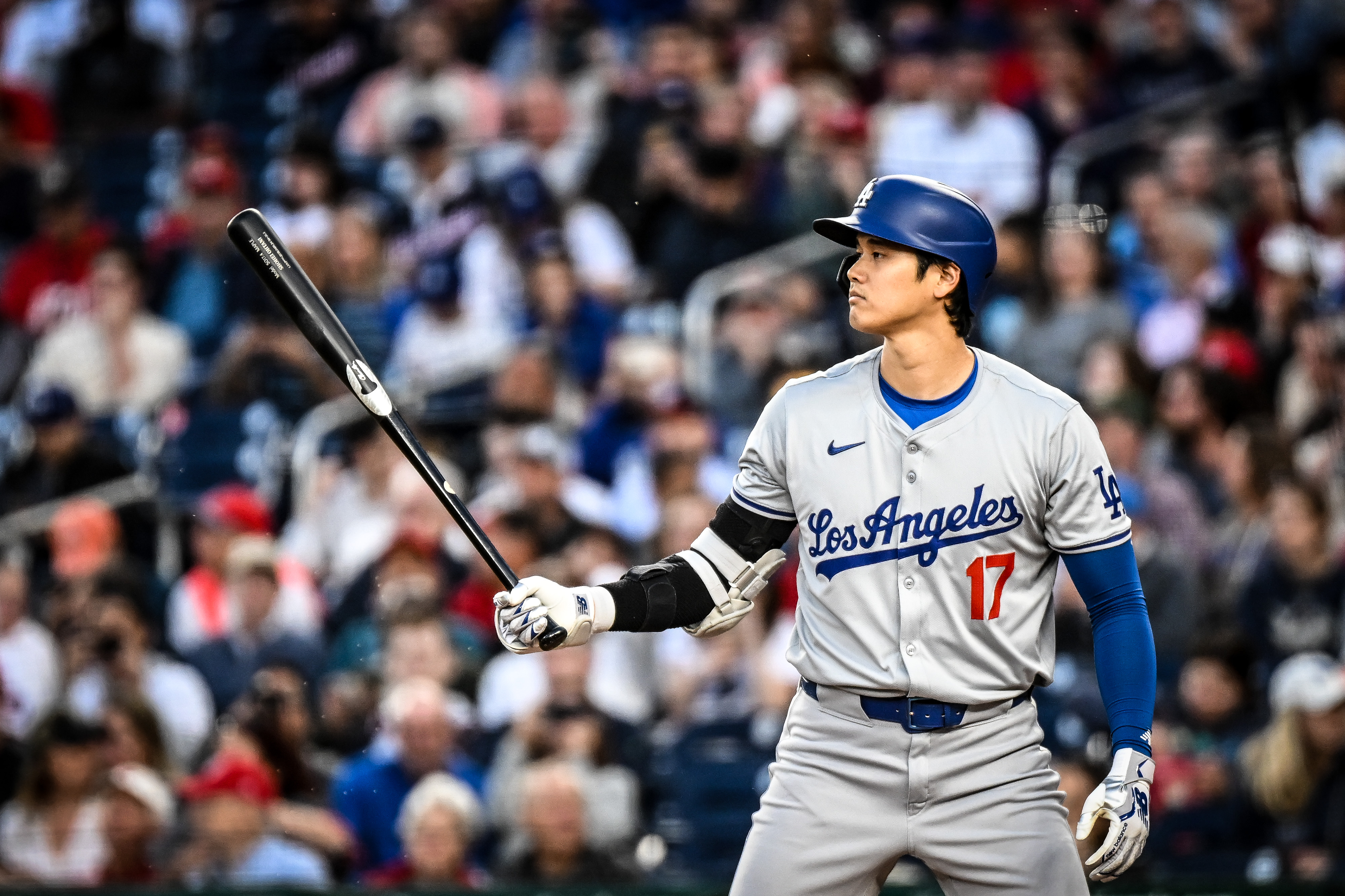
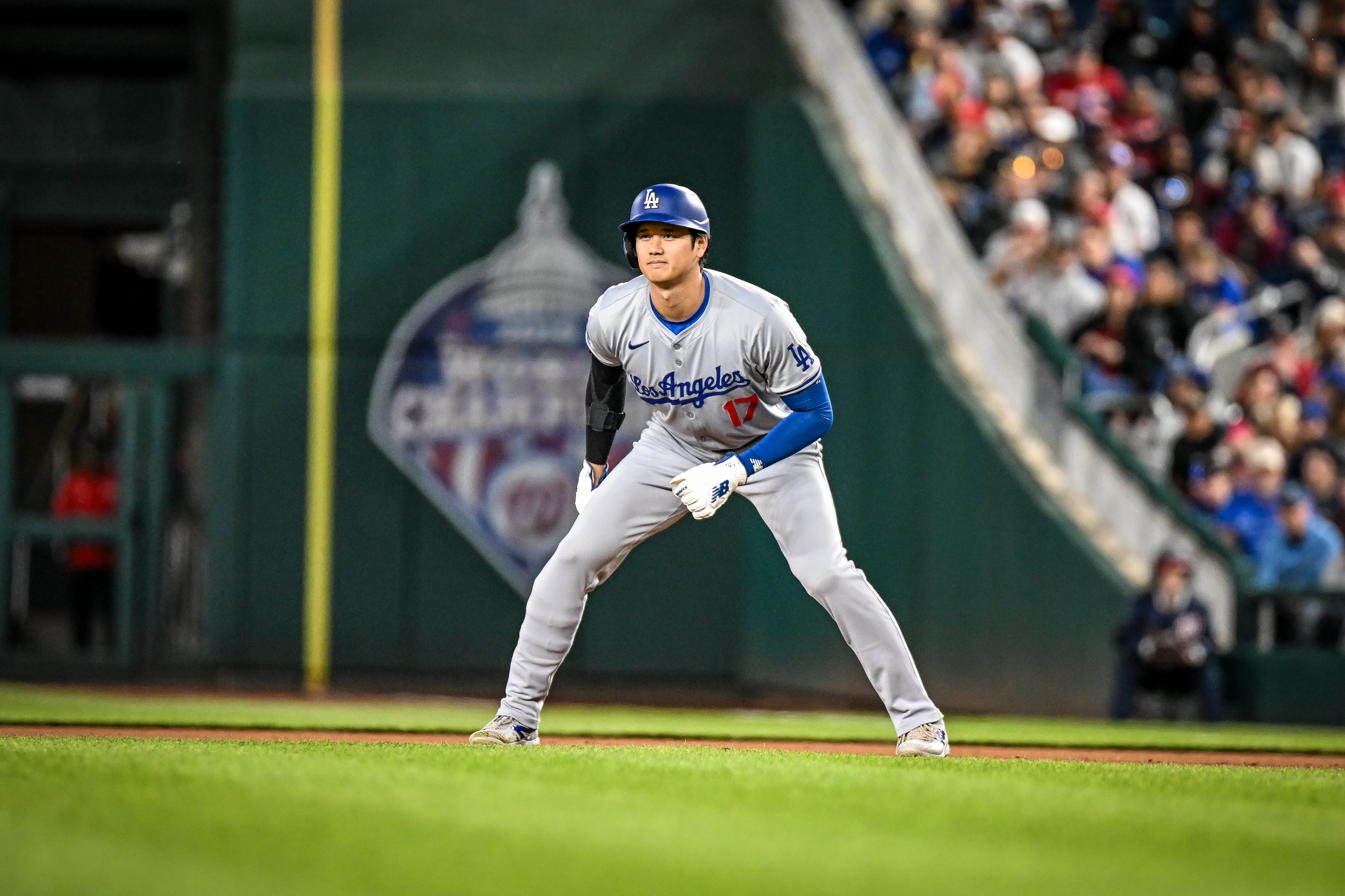
Ohtani getting poised to hit and run the bases in April 2024.

The 50–50 club is a statistical record where a batter records 50 home runs and 50 stolen bases in a single season. The feat has been achieved only once in MLB history, by Shohei Ohtani in his 40–40 season in 2024.

As of 2025, players had stolen 50 bases or more in an MLB season 496 times, while players have hit 50 or more home runs 50 times, but only Ohtani has achieved both in the same season. Barry Bonds and Brady Anderson are the only players to have achieved 50 home runs in one season and 50 stolen bases in another season during their careers. Before Ohtani's 50–50 season, the highest number of home runs in a 50-stolen base season was 41 by Acuña Jr. in 2023, and the highest number of stolen bases in a 50-home run season was 24, a mark shared by Mays in 1955 and Rodriguez in 2007.

In addition to becoming the first member of the 40–40 club to record both his 40th home run and 40th stolen base in the same game, Ohtani recorded his 50th home run and 50th stolen base in a game against the Miami Marlins on September 19, 2024. He entered the game with 48 home runs and 49 stolen bases, then hit three home runs and stole two bases to become the inaugural member of the 50–50 club. In the same game, which also saw the Dodgers clinch a postseason berth, Ohtani tied and then broke the franchise single-season home run record, finishing 6-for-6 with 10 RBIs and 17 total bases.

== In non-MLB leagues ==
After stealing a base in an October 2, 2015 game for the NC Dinos, first baseman Eric Thames became the first player to reach 40 home runs and 40 stolen bases in a season in a Korea Baseball Organization season. The feat has never been achieved in Nippon Professional Baseball; the closest effort was Koji Akiyama's 1987 season, in which he hit 43 home runs and stole 38 bases.

== See also ==
- Baseball statistics
- Triple Crown
- 20–50 club
- 20–20–20 club, similar multiple stat club for doubles, triples and home runs
