= 20–20–20 club =

Accomplishment in baseball

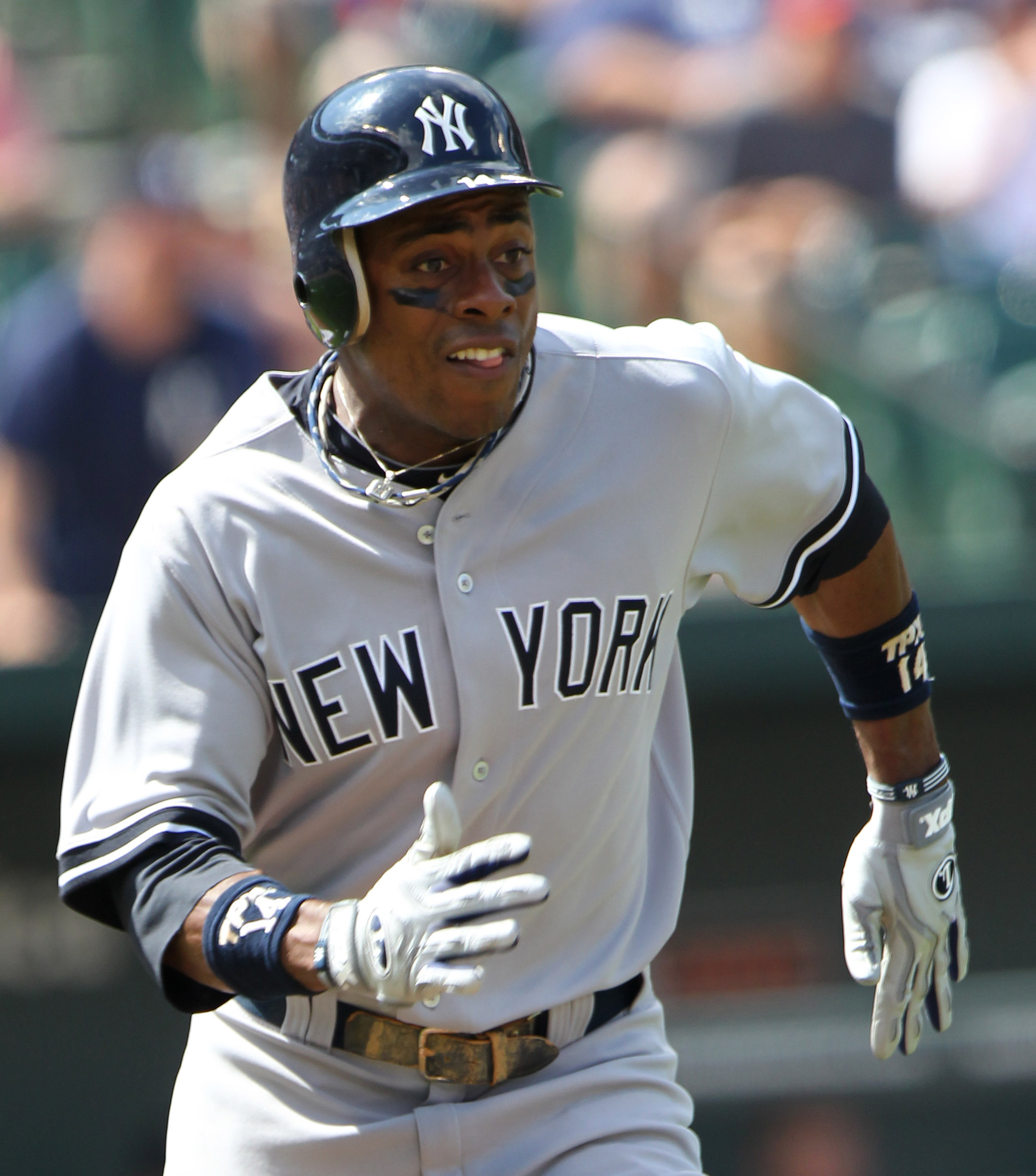
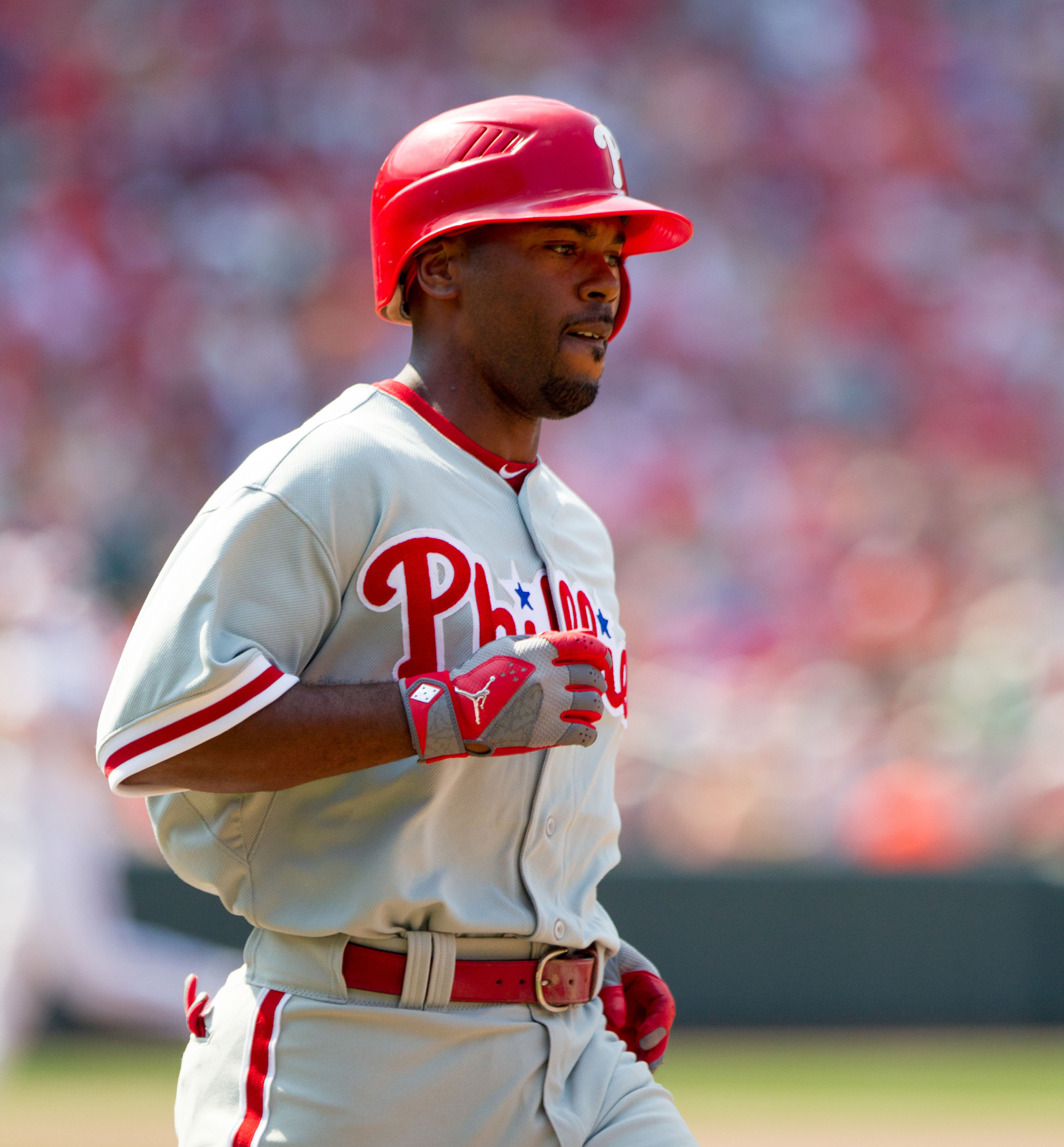
Curtis Granderson (left) and Jimmy Rollins (right) are the most recent players to join the 20–20–20 club, both reaching the milestone in 2007.

In Major League Baseball (MLB), the 20–20–20 club is the group of batters who have collected 20 doubles, 20 triples, and 20 home runs in a single season. Frank Schulte was the first to achieve this, doing so in 1911. The most recent players to reach the milestone – Curtis Granderson and Jimmy Rollins – attained 20–20–20 during the 2007 season. This marked the first time that two players accomplished the achievement in the same season.

In total, seven players are members of the 20–20–20 club. Of these, five were left-handed batters, one was right-handed and one was a switch hitter. Two players – George Brett and Willie Mays – are also members of the 3,000 hit club, and Mays is also a member of the 500 home run club. Schulte, Rollins, and Jim Bottomley won the Most Valuable Player (MVP) Award in the same year as their 20–20–20 season. Both Mays and Rollins joined the club while also hitting 30 home runs and stealing 30 bases that same season to join the 30–30 club. Brett and Rollins collected more than 200 hits alongside achieving 20–20–20. Furthermore, four players amassed 20 or more stolen bases during their 20–20–20 season. These players are collectively referred to as the 20–20–20–20 club.

Historically, there have been numerous players who have hit 20 doubles and 20 home runs in a year. It is the component of triples, however, that makes the 20–20–20 club so difficult to achieve. This is because hitting triples often comes under a similar hit placement as doubles, but may require impressive speed on the part of the runner. This poses a challenge for both a slugger, who may be slower at running the bases and have the tendency to hit line drives and fly balls out of the park for a home run, as well as a speedster, who may be more swift around the bases but may not supply much power to drive the ball far. Since Granderson and Rollins both joined the club in 2007, no AL/NL player has hit 20 triples in a season, regardless of their number of doubles or home runs.

Due to the rare occurrence and low membership of the 20–20–20 club, Baseball Digest called it "the most exclusive club in the Majors" in 1979, when there were only four members. Of the seven members of the club, three have been elected to the Baseball Hall of Fame, two of them on the first ballot. Players are eligible for the Hall of Fame if they have played in at least ten MLB seasons, and have either been retired for five seasons or deceased for at least six months.

== Members ==
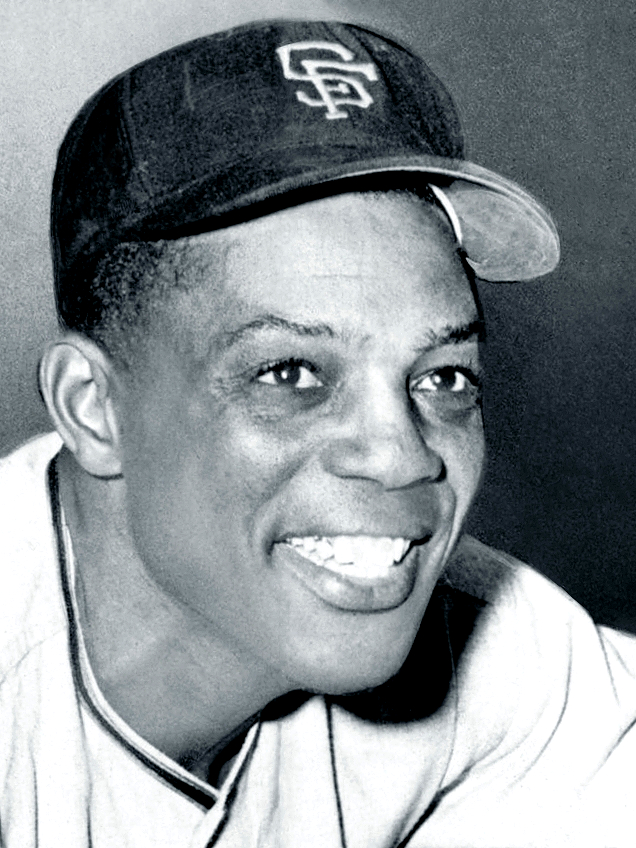
Willie Mays reached both the 20–20–20 club and the 30–30 club during the 1957 season and was the only player to reach both marks until Rollins joined him in 2007.

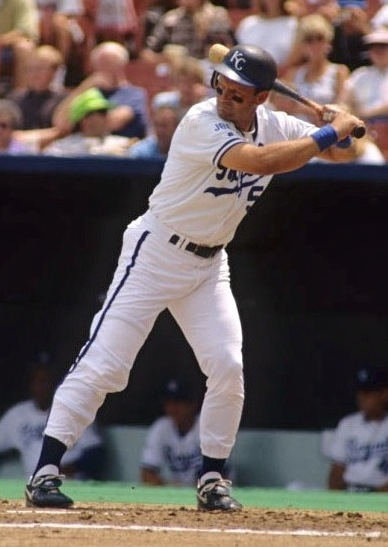
George Brett is one of three 20–20–20 club members to be inducted into the Baseball Hall of Fame.

Key
Year	The year the player's 20–20–20 season occurred
Player	Name of the player
Team	The player's team for his 20–20–20 season
2B	Number of doubles in that year
3B	Number of triples in that year
HR	Number of home runs in that year
SB	Number of stolen bases in that year
†	Elected to the Baseball Hall of Fame

Members of the 20–20–20 club
Year	Player	Team	2B	3B	HR	Ref
1911	Frank Schulte	Chicago Cubs	30	21	21	
1928	Jim Bottomley^{†}	St. Louis Cardinals	42	20	31	
1941	Jeff Heath	Cleveland Indians	32	20	24	
1957	Willie Mays^{†}	New York Giants	26	20	35	
1979	George Brett^{†}	Kansas City Royals	42	20	23	
2007	Curtis Granderson	Detroit Tigers	38	23	23	
2007	Jimmy Rollins	Philadelphia Phillies	38	20	30	

=== 20–20–20–20 club ===
Members of the 20–20–20–20 club
Year	Player	Team	2B	3B	HR	SB	Ref
1911	Frank Schulte	Chicago Cubs	30	21	21	23	
1957	Willie Mays^{†}	New York Giants	26	20	35	38	
2007	Curtis Granderson	Detroit Tigers	38	23	23	26	
2007	Jimmy Rollins	Philadelphia Phillies	38	20	30	41	

== See also ==
- 20–50 club, multiple stat club for home runs and stolen bases
- 30–30 club, multiple stat club for home runs and stolen bases
- 40–40 club, multiple stat club for home runs and stolen bases
- Baseball statistics
- Triple Crown
