= Howard Johnson (baseball) =

American baseball player and coach (born 1960)

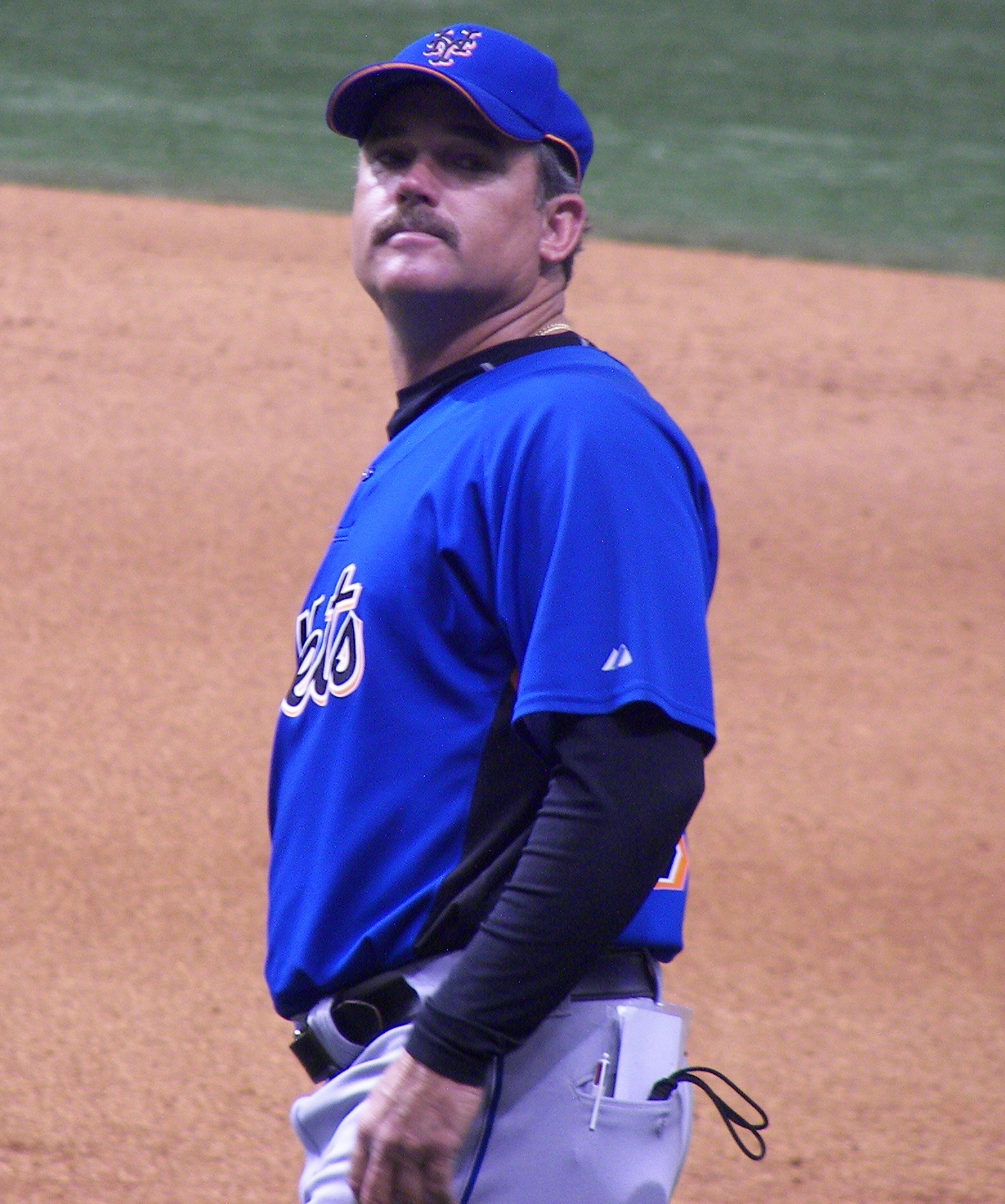
- Johnson with the New York Mets in 2007
- Third baseman
- Born: November 29, 1960 (age 65); Clearwater, Florida, U.S.
- Batted: Switch Threw: Right

MLB debut
- April 14, 1982, for the Detroit Tigers

Last MLB appearance
- October 1, 1995, for the Chicago Cubs

MLB statistics
- Batting average: .249
- Home runs: 228
- Runs batted in: 760
- Stats at Baseball Reference

Teams
- As player: Detroit Tigers (1982–1984); New York Mets (1985–1993); Colorado Rockies (1994); Chicago Cubs (1995); As coach: New York Mets (2007–2010)

Career highlights and awards
- 2× All-Star (1989, 1991); 2× World Series champion (1984, 1986); 2× Silver Slugger Award (1989, 1991); NL home run leader (1991); NL RBI leader (1991); New York Mets Hall of Fame

Howard Michael Johnson (born November 29, 1960), nicknamed "HoJo", is an American former professional baseball third baseman, shortstop and outfielder. He played for the Detroit Tigers, New York Mets, Colorado Rockies, and Chicago Cubs of Major League Baseball (MLB) from 1982 to 1995. He has also coached in MLB for the Mets and Seattle Mariners.

Johnson made his MLB debut with the Tigers in 1982 and was a part of the 1984 World Series champions. The Tigers traded Johnson to the Mets after the season and he won a second World Series title in 1986. Johnson was a two-time All-Star with the Mets, in 1989 and 1991, and led the National League in home runs and runs batted in in 1991. After playing for the Mets through the 1993 season, Johnson finished his career with the Rockies in 1994 and the Cubs in 1995.

Johnson is third on the Mets' all-time lists for home runs, runs batted in, doubles, and stolen bases. He was inducted into the New York Mets Hall of Fame.

== Early life ==
Johnson was born on November 29, 1960, in Clearwater, Florida, to Bill and Sue Johnson. He was the oldest of three children. He was named for his grandfather, Raymond Howard Johnson. His family went to Howard Johnson's every Sunday after church, where he was never charged for lunch.

Bill coached Howard in Little League Baseball and taught him to become a switch hitter when he was three or four years old.

Johnson attended Clearwater High School and played on their baseball team. He had a .375 batting average in his junior year, but it declined to .275 in his senior year. As a pitcher, Johnson had a 0.91 earned run average and 110 strikeouts in 91 innings pitched in his senior year. The New York Yankees selected Johnson in the 23rd round of the 1978 MLB draft, but they did not offer him a signing bonus and he instead attended St. Petersburg Junior College and played college baseball as a pitcher and a position player.

== Baseball career ==
=== 1979–1983: Transition from minor leagues to major leagues ===
The Detroit Tigers selected Johnson in the first round, with the 12th overall selection, of MLB's secondary draft in January 1979. He signed with the Tigers, who converted him into an infielder. He played for the Lakeland Tigers of the Class A Florida State League in 1979 and 1980. The Tigers promoted him to the Birmingham Barons of the Class AA Southern League, where he hit 22 home runs.

Johnson began the 1982 season with the Evansville Triplets of the Class AAA American Association. He was promoted to the major leagues. Johnson finished the season with a .316 batting average in the major leagues. He began the 1983 season in the major leagues with the Tigers, but was demoted to Evansville in May. He returned to the Tigers later in the year.

=== 1984: Detroit Tigers and a first championship ===
In 1984, Johnson was back with the Tigers and was made the left side of a platoon with Tom Brookens. Johnson started fairly well but had a poor second half. He finished the regular season with a .248 batting average, 12 home runs, and 50 runs batted in (RBIs) and in 355 at bats. The Tigers led the division for the entire season to reach the 1984 MLB postseason, but Johnson did not play in the 1984 American League Championship Series as manager Sparky Anderson preferred to use more experienced players. Brookens, Marty Castillo, and Darrell Evans split time at third. In the 1984 World Series, the Tigers used Johnson as a pinch hitter once; he reached base on an error by second baseman Alan Wiggins as the Tigers eased through the postseason en route to the world championship.

=== 1985–1986: New York Mets and a second championship ===
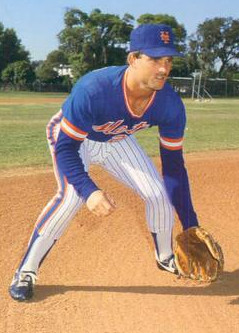
Johnson in 1986

The Tigers traded Johnson to the New York Mets for Walt Terrell at the Winter Meetings on December 7, 1984. Three days later, the Mets traded third baseman Hubie Brooks to the Montreal Expos as part of a trade for catcher Gary Carter.

Johnson's inability to hit well from the right side resulted in him being platooned by the Mets in 1985, this time with Ray Knight. Both started terribly and neither reached .200 until early July. Johnson hit below average all season, while Knight was even worse. The Mets, as they had in 1984, narrowly missed the postseason in 1985.

1986 was the year of the Mets and both Johnson and Knight started very well. The Mets' problems shifted from third base to shortstop as Rafael Santana struggled to keep his average above .150 most of the season. Johnson was a capable shortstop defensively and picked up extra playing time moving between short and third but his hitting started declining in May. Between his mediocre hitting, continued lack of power, and an injury that wiped out three weeks in June, Johnson played in only 88 games in the regular season. When he returned from the June injury, Johnson went on a home run tear including two in his first game back and, within six weeks, his slugging percentage jumped from .376 to .510. One of Johnson's home runs occurred in a legendary game on July 22, 1986, against the Cincinnati Reds. When a 10th-inning bench-clearing fight ended, three Mets players were out of the game and they were forced to spend the rest of the game with a pitcher in the outfield and two pitchers in the batting lineup. When one of the pitchers, Jesse Orosco, drew a walk in the 14th inning, Johnson followed with a three-run home run that led to a Mets win. Johnson faded down the stretch and was virtually shut out of the postseason, going 0-for-7 in four games. His only start was Game 2 of the 1986 World Series, when he went 0-for-4 in a crucial Mets loss that put them in an 0–2 hole. His only other at bat in the series was in Game 6, when he struck out in the ninth inning. Nevertheless, at age 25, Johnson already had his second World Series ring.

=== 1987: Breakout season ===
Knight became a free agent after the 1986 World Series and left the Mets. Johnson, given sole ownership of the third base position, began a three-month power surge in mid-May. In 10 games, he hit five home runs, including a pair of three-run shots, with 13 RBIs. In an 11-game span a month later, he hit another six home runs with 10 RBIs. In seven games around the all-star break, he hit another six home runs and seven RBIs, raising his slugging percentage over .520. With his 22nd home run of the season in mid-July, the previously light-hitting Johnson took over the team home run lead from Darryl Strawberry while hitting from the seventh spot in the batting order. He ended July with six RBIs in seven games along with a four-hit game, and then started August with a grand slam. In a 13-game span in late July and early August, he had at least one RBI in all but one game and amassed 17 RBIs overall. Three games in mid-August brought another three home runs and seven RBIs. Johnson was accused of using a corked bat in July by Astros manager Hal Lanier and in August by Cardinals manager Whitey Herzog. Six of his bats were confiscated by umpires and X-rayed; all were found to be legal.

Johnson's power surge was complemented by a surge in speed. Although he had 31 stolen bases in five previous seasons, on September 11, 1987, Johnson stole his 30th base to join the 30–30 club for the first time. Johnson became the first switch-hitter to join the club, and he and Strawberry became the only teammates to achieve 30–30 status in the same season. Another grand slam in September brought Johnson's home run total to 36, just four shy of his entire career before 1987. Unfortunately for the Mets, as Johnson's power faded, so did their run at the postseason and the defending champions missed the playoffs. The entire league took notice of Johnson's unexpected rise in 1987 and he received 42 points in the voting for National League MVP. His home run and RBI totals were second only to Strawberry on the team and his home runs were seventh-best in the entire majors. His right-handed hitting was substantially better than his left-handed hitting with numbers better in almost every category including a batting average 36 points higher and slugging 74 points higher. His 36 home runs overall were the most in National League history by a switch-hitter, breaking Ripper Collins' 53-year-old record.

In 1988, Johnson received a raise from $297,500 to $695,000. He reverted to hitting much better from the left side with a .183 average and .338 slugging from the right side. A mid-season injury to his right shoulder contributed to his poor offense. One bright spot was September 8, 1988, when he had the only five-hit game of his career, going 5-for-5 with a three-run home run and four RBIs in a Wrigley Field victory. While Johnson was struggling to stay above .230, the Mets tried out 21-year-old third-base prospect, Gregg Jefferies, who blazed through September. After 13 games, Jefferies, who was also a switch hitter, had a batting average of .462 and a fantastic slugging percentage of .962 with five home runs, a four-hit game and four three-hit games. Despite Johnson's mediocre season, the Mets easily coasted to a division win but Johnson went 1-for-18 with six strikeouts in the 1988 NLCS. With the heavily favored Mets down 3–2 in the series, he was benched for Games 6 and 7 in favor of Jefferies. Johnson pinch-hit in Game 7 and struck out for the final out of the Mets disappointing season.

=== 1988–1989: Trade rumors ===
With Johnson and Jefferies competing for the third base job, the 1988–89 off-season was filled with trade rumors. The logjam was cleared when second baseman Wally Backman was traded to the Minnesota Twins making Jefferies the Mets' regular second baseman in 1989. Johnson was moved from sixth or seventh in the lineup to third, in front of star slugger Darryl Strawberry, who had led the N.L. in home runs and slugging in 1988. Johnson batted .340 with 11 home runs in June, earning him his first National League Player of the Month Award. On July 9, the Mets announced that they signed Johnson to a three-year contract extension worth $6.1 million, making him their second-highest paid player behind Dwight Gooden.

Mike Schmidt was elected to start at third base for the N.L. but he retired six weeks before the game. As a result, Johnson was chosen to start for his first All-Star Game. In his first All-Star at bat, he drove in the second run of the game in which the N.L. lost 5–3. Johnson played well in the second half but an overall team slowdown knocked the Mets out of the playoffs. With his 30th home run on August 20, 1989, Johnson joined Bobby Bonds and Willie Mays as the only multi-year members of the 30–30 club. The only other infielders in major league history who had had multiple 30–30 seasons as of 2011 were Ian Kinsler, Alfonso Soriano, and Jeff Bagwell. Johnson ended the 1989 season with 36 home runs, tying his career-high and his own N.L. record for switch hitters. He also broke the 100-RBI mark for the first time, finishing with 101. Only Kevin Mitchell's career year stopped Johnson from winning both the home run and slugging titles in the N.L. like his teammate Strawberry had done in 1987. Johnson also stole 41 bases, a career high, and scored 104 runs which tied for first in the N.L. He received 153 points in voting for N.L. MVP, finishing fifth. Both his on-base percentage and slugging from 1989 were career highs.

In 1990, Johnson stole 34 bases and, for the third time, he played in over 150 games. Despite finishing with only a .244 average and .434 slugging percentage, Johnson still racked up 90 RBIs and 37 doubles. He spent the last two months of the season as Kevin Elster's replacement at shortstop. The Mets started the season so poorly that manager Davey Johnson was fired in May but, under new manager Bud Harrelson, they recovered to win 91 games. They even took over first place in early September, but still missed the playoffs. Johnson's best game was his first ever five-RBI game, including a grand slam, at Wrigley Field on June 13, 1990. The quality of his season again mirrored the quality of his right-handed hitting, as he batted only .208 from his weaker side.

=== 1990–1991: Leading the National League ===
Johnson's fall-off in 1990 led to more trade rumors. Instead, the Mets' troubled all-time home run and RBIs leader, Darryl Strawberry, left New York when he was signed by the Los Angeles Dodgers in December 1990. Johnson became the leader of the offense for the Mets and, in response, became arguably the best offensive player in the National League in 1991, winning two-thirds of the coveted Triple Crown. Johnson started slowly in April and caught fire in early May. The RBIs came in waves all season as he hit a right-handed grand slam on June 18, 1991, and had 26 RBIs in 22 games before the All-Star break. With 63 RBI, Johnson was selected as a reserve to his second and last All-Star Game. He finished out July well and had a slow August before a fantastic September in which he hit ten home runs with 28 RBIs while slugging nearly .700, earning him his second National League Player of the Month award. Johnson was the last Met to win the award until David Wright in June 2006.

At season's end, Johnson had won both the National League home run title and RBI title. The 38 home runs broke his own record for N.L. switch hitters and 117 RBIs set the Met record for most runs batted in during a season until 1999. Both were also career bests for Johnson. On October 1, 1991, he stole his 30th base becoming only the second player, after Bobby Bonds, to join the 30–30 club in three different seasons. In June 1991, he passed Dave Kingman into second place on the Mets' all-time home run list. Johnson received 112 votes for National League MVP, finishing fifth. He likely would have received more MVP consideration except that the Mets had fallen all the way to a 77–84 record, second-to-last in the division. Despite his heroics, the Mets scored the fifth fewest runs per game in the majors. Johnson's had become a one-man show—his 38 home runs were more than the next two highest totals on the team combined and his RBI total was tops on the team by more than 40. His biggest liability was defense as he accumulated a career-worst 31 errors. In September, with Johnson leading the league with 29 errors, the Mets played Johnson as a right fielder for most of the rest of the year.

=== 1992–1995: Later years and retirement ===
Going into the 1992 season, Johnson was surrounded by high-priced veterans like Eddie Murray, Bobby Bonilla, Vince Coleman, and Bret Saberhagen. While he was a spotty right-handed hitter his whole career, in 1992, he stopped hitting from either side of the plate. He hit three home runs in April and followed up with an even worse May. After three months, he had only seven home runs and was batting .223 with a slugging percentage well under .400. A home run in late June turned out to be his last of the season. He went homerless for another month before fracturing his wrist in late July. He played a few more games in agony before the fracture was diagnosed and his season ended in early August. Johnson made over $2 million while his slugging percentage dropped nearly 200 points from 1991. The Mets had the third-highest payroll in the majors and finished 72–90, two games out of last place in the division. He hit his 183rd National League home run that year, breaking Ted Simmons' league career record for home runs by a switch hitter.

In 1993, a year that found the Mets with 103 losses and the worst record in the majors, Johnson's batting average did not reach .200 until almost May and his slugging only rose above .400 for barely a week before diving back down. He missed three weeks in June and his season again ended prematurely in late July. At the end of the campaign, Johnson was granted free agency.

Johnson signed with the Colorado Rockies in 1994. Despite the hitter-friendly atmosphere of Mile High Stadium, he wound up hitting more home runs on the road finishing with only ten overall. In the crowded left field position, he split time with Mike Kingery and Eric Young but was mostly pinch hitting by August when the 1994–95 Major League Baseball strike ended the season. He batted .211 with 10 home runs and the Rockies declined his $2.95 million option for the 1995 season, paying him a $400,000 buyout and making him a free agent.

Shortly after the strike ended in April 1995, Johnson signed with the Chicago Cubs. He saw limited playing time and his average was at .115 in mid-August, lower than many of the team's pitchers. All of his production was at Wrigley Field, as his average on the road was under .100 with only two extra-base hits. A spurt in September raised his overall average to .195 but was not enough to garner a new contract from the Cubs. When he found no team interested, Johnson retired at age 35.

=== 1996–present: Post-retirement / comeback attempts / coaching career ===
After retiring, Johnson expressed an interest in coaching. In mid-1996, the Tampa Bay Devil Rays named Johnson to the coaching staff of their rookie-level minor league team, the Butte Copper Kings.

In February 1997, Johnson attempted a comeback with the Mets as a non-roster player. The Mets cut Johnson after he batted .129 during spring training and he announced his retirement. Later in the year, he signed on as a scout with the Mets.

Johnson was named the batting coach of the Mets' Brooklyn Cyclones minor league team for 2001. He was made the manager for 2002 after Brooklyn was named co-champion of the New York–Penn League (the championship was cancelled due to the September 11, 2001 attacks). In 2003, Johnson was the hitting coach under manager, Ken Oberkfell, when the St. Lucie Mets won the Florida State League championship. Johnson and Oberkfell were promoted to the AA Binghamton Mets for 2004 and guided them into the Eastern League playoffs. Both were promoted again to the AAA Norfolk Tides for 2005 and the Tides posted their highest batting average in six seasons. He served as the Tides' hitting coach again in 2006 under Oberkfell.

In 2007, Johnson became the first base coach for the Mets, In July, he was named the hitting coach after Rick Down was fired. In 2011, he was replaced by Dave Hudgens.

In 2011, at age 50, Johnson played in two minor league games with his son Glen for the Rockland Boulders of the Can-Am League, an independent baseball league.

Johnson was named hitting coach for AAA Tacoma Rainiers of the Seattle Mariners organization for the 2013 baseball season. Johnson joined the Mariners as a hitting coach for the 2014 season, as part of the new coaching staff. He was replaced by Edgar Martínez on June 20, 2015.

Johnson managed the single-A Down East Wood Ducks in 2017, and was hitting instructor for the AAA Round Rock Express in 2018. In 2019, he was the hitting coach for the AAA Nashville Sounds.

In 2020, Johnson joined the Toros de Tijuana of the Mexican League as their hitting coach.

== Notable achievements ==
- Member of the 1984 World Series champion Tigers and the 1986 World Series champion Mets.
- 1992–1997: Held career National League record for home runs by a switch hitter.
- 1987–1996: Held single-season National League record for home runs by a switch hitter.
- Three-time member of the 30–30 club (1987, 1989 and 1991). Only Bobby Bonds, Barry Bonds and Alfonso Soriano have reached the marks more often.
- 1987–1991: Second highest home run total in the National League behind only teammate Darryl Strawberry.
- 1989 and 1991: Member of the National League All-Star team.
- 1989 and 1991: Winner of National League Silver Slugger award for third basemen.
- Second on Mets all-time home run list from 1991 until 2004.
- Second on Mets all-time RBI list from 1993 until 2005.
- 1991: Became the only switch-hitter to ever lead the NL in HRs and RBIs in the same season.
- 1991: Became the only Met to lead the National League in RBI.
- 1991: Became the first switch-hitter to lead the National League in RBI. (Lance Berkman became the second in 2002.)
- June 1989, September 1991: Winner of the National League Player of the Month award. He was the last Met to win the award until David Wright in June 2006.

Within two years of his retirement, Johnson's two major National League switch-hitting home run records were broken. In 1996, his single-season record was broken by former teammate, Todd Hundley, who finished with 41. In 1997, his career record was broken by another former teammate, Bobby Bonilla, who hit his 210th National League home run in the midst of a championship season with the Florida Marlins.

Bonilla finished his career in 2001 with 249 NL home runs, but Chipper Jones of the Braves currently holds the NL single-season switch hit HR record (45), achieved in 1999, and the career mark as well (452).

Mike Piazza passed Johnson into second-place on both the all-time Mets home run list in 2004 and the all-time Mets RBI list in 2005.

In 2001, Johnson was on the Baseball Hall of Fame ballot but received no votes.

== Personal life ==
Howard and his wife, Kim, have two daughters and a son. Shannon is a figure skating coach in Florida. Glen was selected by the Mets in the 36th round of the 2007 draft but did not sign with the team. He played as an infielder for the Newark Bears.

== See also ==
- 1984 Detroit Tigers season
- List of Major League Baseball career home run leaders
- List of Major League Baseball career stolen bases leaders
- 30–30 club
- List of Major League Baseball annual runs batted in leaders
- List of Major League Baseball annual home run leaders
- List of Major League Baseball annual runs scored leaders

Preceded by Will Clark; Will Clark	National League Player of the Month; June 1989; September 1991	Succeeded by Mark Grace; Barry Bonds
Preceded by Rick Down	New York Mets hitting coach 2007–2010	Succeeded by Dave Hudgens
