= 30–30 club =

Accomplishment in baseball

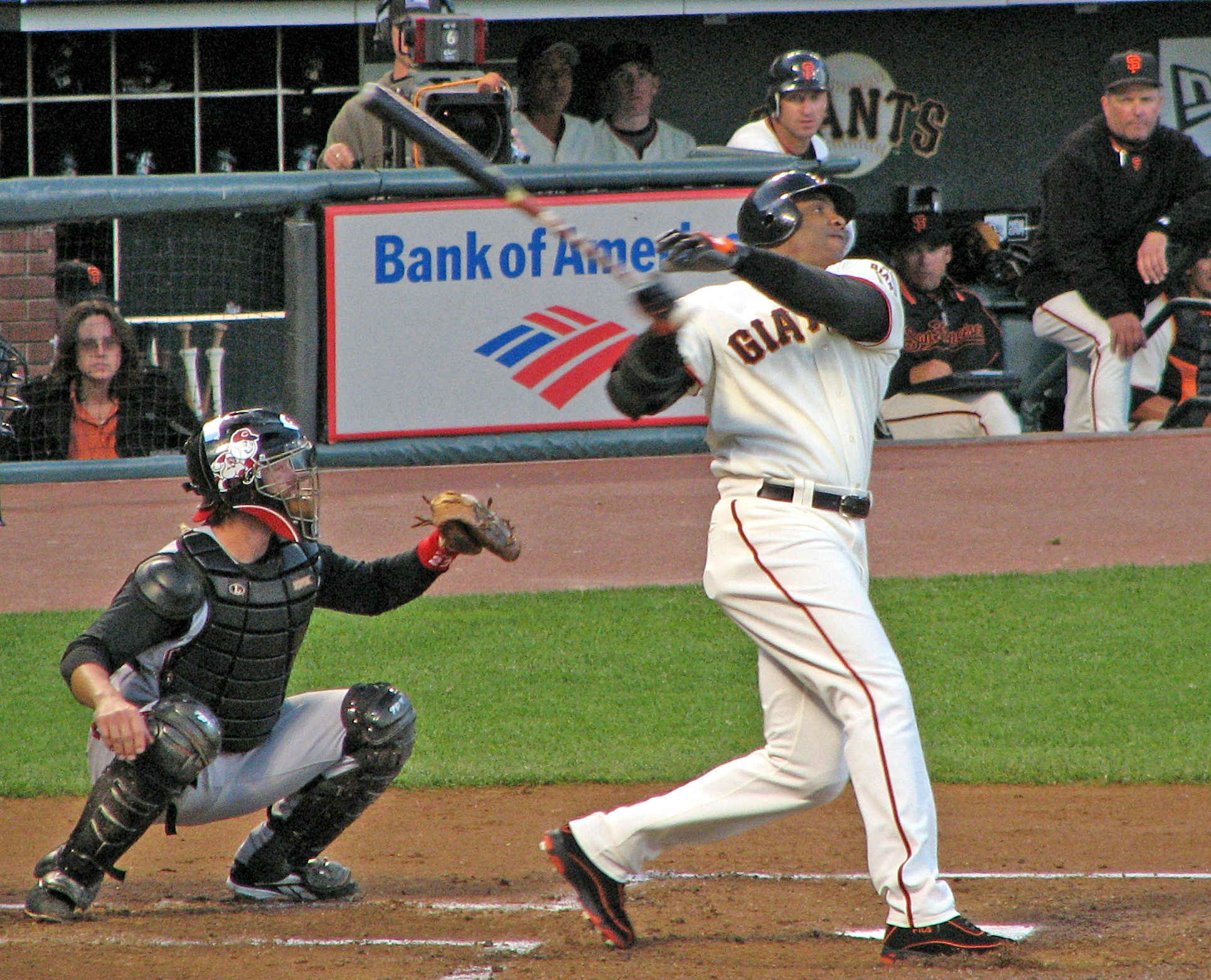
Barry Bonds joined the 30–30 club in five seasons, a record he shares with his father Bobby.

In Major League Baseball (MLB), the 30–30 club is the group of 53 batters who have collected 30 home runs and 30 stolen bases in a single season. Baseball Digest called the 30–30 club "the most celebrated feat that can be achieved by a player who has both power and speed." Six members have been elected to the National Baseball Hall of Fame.

== Background ==
Ken Williams was the first to achieve this, in 1922. He remained the sole member of the club for 34 years until Willie Mays achieved consecutive 30–30 seasons in 1956 and 1957. Bobby Bonds became the club's fourth member in 1969; he subsequently became the first player to achieve the mark in three, four, and five seasons. His son Barry Bonds is the only other player with five 30–30 seasons.

In total, 53 players have joined the 30–30 club, with 19 achieving it multiple times, resulting in 82 individual seasons overall. Of these 53, 30 were right-handed batters, 16 were left-handed, and seven were switch hitters. Thirteen of the 53 players (including eight active members of the 30–30 club) have played for only one major league team. The New York Mets are the only franchise to have five players reach the milestone, and have had the most individual 30–30 seasons (8) as well (Howard Johnson did it three times, Francisco Lindor two). The Cincinnati Reds have had four players reach the milestone. The Atlanta Braves, Cleveland Indians, Colorado Rockies, Los Angeles Dodgers, Milwaukee Brewers, and San Francisco Giants each have had three players reach the milestone. Six franchises, the St. Louis Cardinals, San Diego Padres, Tampa Bay Rays, Detroit Tigers, Minnesota Twins, and Chicago White Sox, have never had a 30-30 season. Although Bobby Bonds played for the White Sox for part of his 31 home run, 43 stolen base 1978 season, he only hit two home runs and stole six bases during his time in Chicago that season; the other team Bonds played for in 1978, the Texas Rangers, does not get credit for his 30–30 season either, as he hit only 29 home runs in Texas that season. The only other player to play for multiple franchises in a 30–30 season is Carlos Beltrán in 2004, who amassed 15 home runs and 14 stolen bases with the Kansas City Royals before being traded to the Houston Astros and hitting 23 home runs and stealing 28 bases.

Jose Canseco is the heaviest player to record a 30–30 season, reaching the mark at 240 pounds (108.9 kilograms) in 1988, while the lightest are Tommy Harper (1970), Eric Davis (1987), and Sammy Sosa (1993 and 1995) at 165 pounds (74.8 kilograms). Darryl Strawberry (1987) is the tallest player to achieve the milestone at 6 feet 6 inches (198.1 centimetres), while the shortest are Jimmy Rollins (2007) and Cedric Mullins (2021), both standing 5 feet 7 inches (170.2 centimetres).

Five players – Hank Aaron, Barry Bonds, Willie Mays, Alex Rodriguez and Sammy Sosa – are also members of the 500-home-run club, and Aaron, Mays and Rodriguez are also members of the 3,000-hit club. Dale Murphy, Jose Canseco, Barry Bonds, Larry Walker, Jimmy Rollins, Ryan Braun, Mookie Betts, Ronald Acuña Jr., and Shohei Ohtani won the Most Valuable Player (MVP) Award in the same year as their 30–30 season; Bonds did so twice, in 1990 and 1992. Mays and Rollins also reached the 20–20–20 club in the same season. A single season has seen as many as seven players accomplish 30–30; this happened only once, in 2025 (Corbin Carroll, Jazz Chisholm Jr., Pete Crow-Armstrong, Francisco Lindor, José Ramírez, Julio Rodríguez and Juan Soto). The feat has been accomplished by teammates three times: the 1987 New York Mets (Darryl Strawberry and Howard Johnson), the 1996 Colorado Rockies (Ellis Burks and Dante Bichette) and the 2025 New York Mets (Juan Soto and Francisco Lindor). Bobby Witt Jr. of the Kansas City Royals was the first shortstop to achieve multiple 30–30 seasons, reaching this milestone in both 2023, with 30 home runs and 49 stolen bases, and 2024, with 32 home runs and 31 stolen bases, before being joined by Francisco Lindor who had his first 30-30 season in 2023 having both 31 home runs and stolen bases, then doing it again in 2025 with 31 home runs and stolen bases. Mike Trout became the youngest member of the 30–30 club, doing so at the age of 20 in 2012. The oldest players to record a 30–30 season did so in their age-32 season: José Ramírez (2025), Barry Bonds (1997), Dante Bichette (1996), Ellis Burks (1996), Bobby Bonds (1978), and Ken Williams (1922). Eric Davis achieved a 30–30 season (37 home runs, 50 stolen bases) in 129 games in 1987, setting a record for the fewest games played by a player in a 30–30 season.

== Members ==
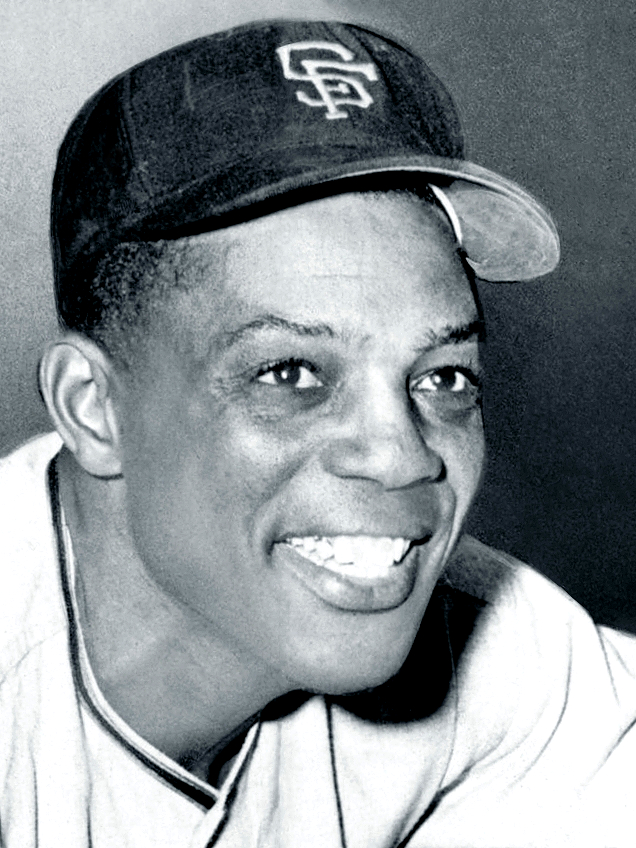
Willie Mays became the first player to achieve multiple 30–30 seasons; he accomplished the feat in back-to-back years.

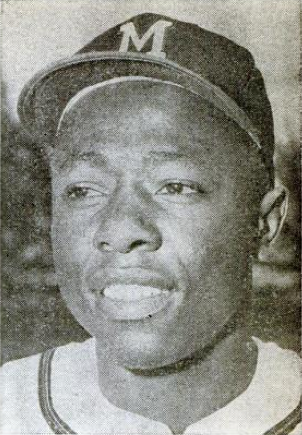
Hank Aaron is one of six 30–30 club members to be inducted into the Baseball Hall of Fame.

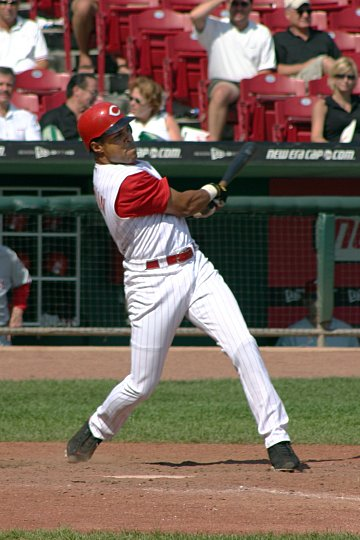
Barry Larkin attained 30–30 in 1996.

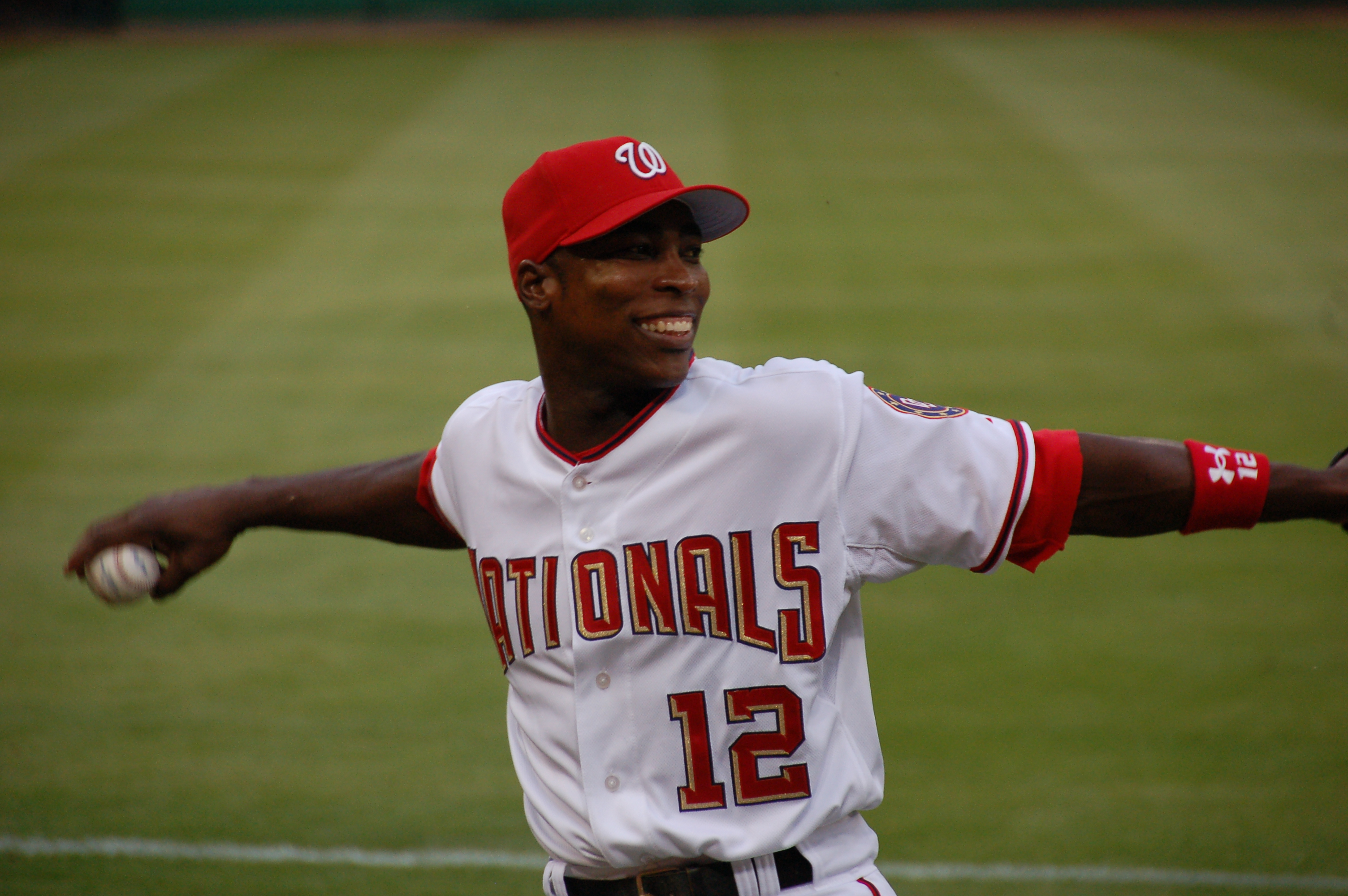
Alfonso Soriano reached the 30–30 club in four seasons, second only to Bobby and Barry Bonds.

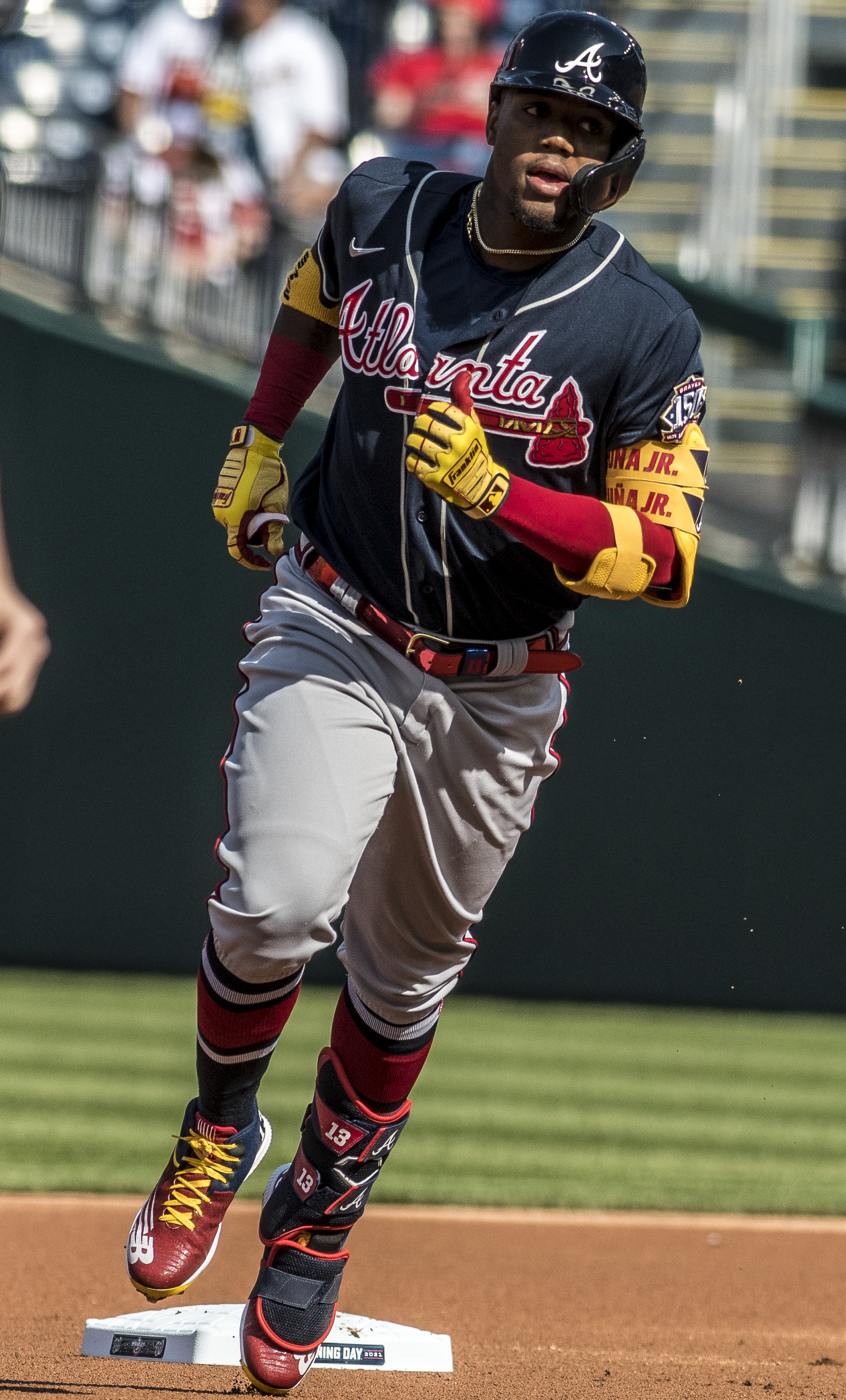
Ronald Acuña Jr. reached the 30–30 club in two seasons (2019 and 2023). He is the first player in history to reach the 30–60 and 40-70 clubs.

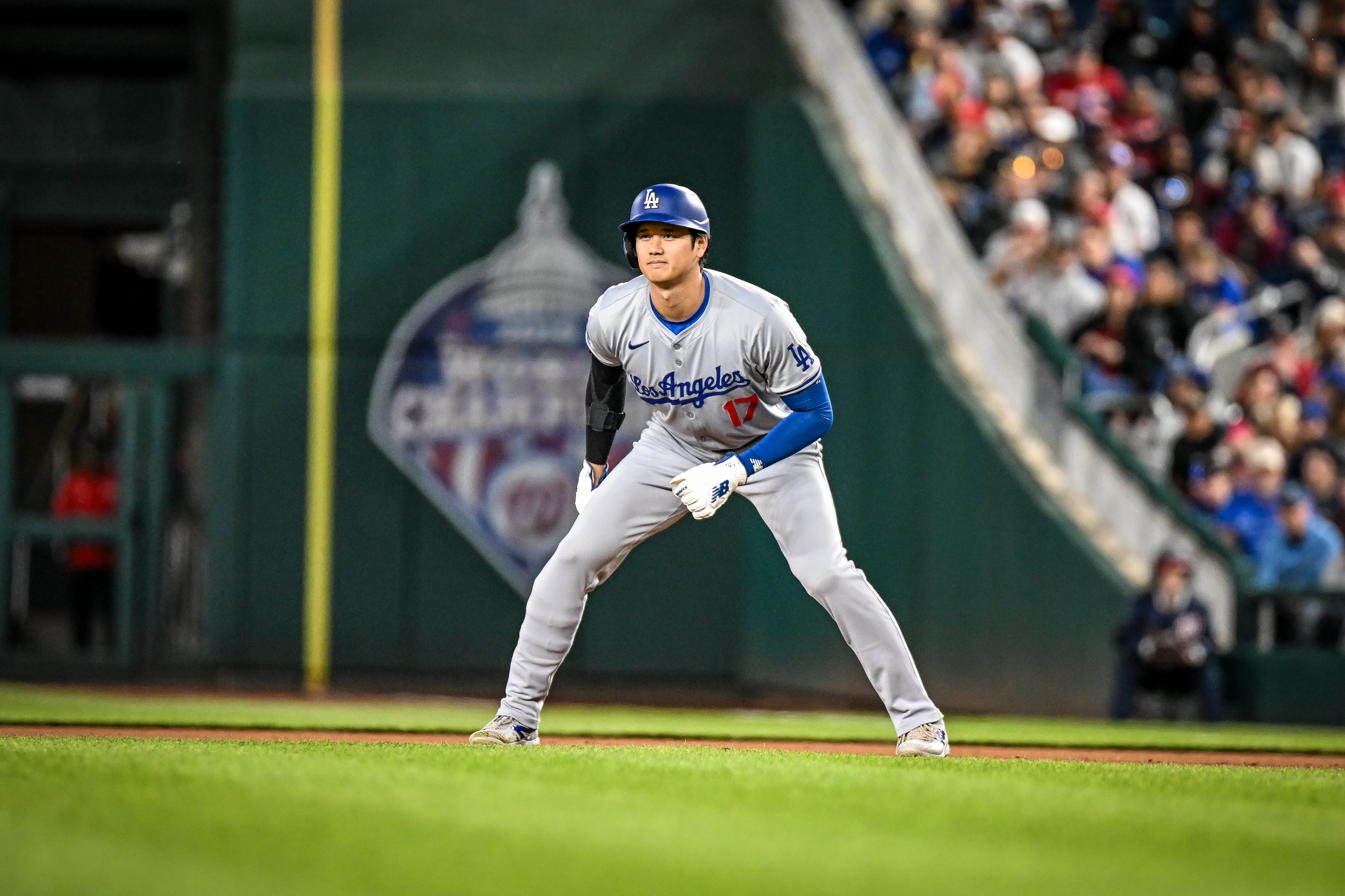
Shohei Ohtani is the only player in MLB history to reach the 50–50 club (2024).

Key
Year	The year the player's 30–30 season occurred
Player (X)	Name of the player (number of 30–30 seasons at that point, if more than one)
Team	The player's team for his 30–30 season
HR	Number of home runs in that year
SB	Number of stolen bases in that year
&	Denotes 40–40 season
#	Denotes 50–50 season
†	Elected to the Baseball Hall of Fame
‡	Player is active

Members of the 30–30 club
Year	Player	Team	HR	SB	Ref.
1922	Ken Williams	St. Louis Browns	39	37	
1956	Willie Mays^{†}	New York Giants	36	40	
1957	Willie Mays^{†} (2)	New York Giants	35	38	
1963	Hank Aaron^{†}	Milwaukee Braves	44	31	
1969	Bobby Bonds	San Francisco Giants	32	45	
1970	Tommy Harper	Milwaukee Brewers	31	38	
1973	Bobby Bonds (2)	San Francisco Giants	39	43	
1975	Bobby Bonds (3)	New York Yankees	32	30	
1977	Bobby Bonds (4)	California Angels	37	41	
1978	Bobby Bonds (5)	Chicago White Sox; Texas Rangers	31	43	
1983	Dale Murphy	Atlanta Braves	36	30	
1987	Joe Carter	Cleveland Indians	32	31	
1987	Eric Davis	Cincinnati Reds	37	50	
1987	Howard Johnson	New York Mets	36	32	
1987	Darryl Strawberry	New York Mets	39	36	
1988	Jose Canseco	Oakland Athletics	42^{&}	40^{&}	
1989	Howard Johnson (2)	New York Mets	36	41	
1990	Barry Bonds	Pittsburgh Pirates	33	52	
1990	Ron Gant	Atlanta Braves	32	33	
1991	Ron Gant (2)	Atlanta Braves	32	34	
1991	Howard Johnson (3)	New York Mets	38	30	
1992	Barry Bonds (2)	Pittsburgh Pirates	34	39	
1993	Sammy Sosa	Chicago Cubs	33	36	
1995	Barry Bonds (3)	San Francisco Giants	33	31	
1995	Sammy Sosa (2)	Chicago Cubs	36	34	
1996	Dante Bichette	Colorado Rockies	31	31	
1996	Barry Bonds (4)	San Francisco Giants	42^{&}	40^{&}	
1996	Ellis Burks	Colorado Rockies	40	32	
1996	Barry Larkin^{†}	Cincinnati Reds	33	36	
1997	Jeff Bagwell^{†}	Houston Astros	43	31	
1997	Barry Bonds (5)	San Francisco Giants	40	37	
1997	Raúl Mondesí	Los Angeles Dodgers	30	32	
1997	Larry Walker^{†}	Colorado Rockies	49	33	
1998	Shawn Green	Toronto Blue Jays	35	35	
1998	Alex Rodriguez	Seattle Mariners	42^{&}	46^{&}	
1999	Jeff Bagwell^{†} (2)	Houston Astros	42	30	
1999	Raúl Mondesí (2)	Los Angeles Dodgers	33	36	
2000	Preston Wilson	Florida Marlins	31	36	
2001	Bobby Abreu	Philadelphia Phillies	31	36	
2001	José Cruz Jr.	Toronto Blue Jays	34	32	
2001	Vladimir Guerrero^{†}	Montreal Expos	34	37	
2002	Vladimir Guerrero^{†} (2)	Montreal Expos	39	40	
2002	Alfonso Soriano	New York Yankees	39	41	
2003	Alfonso Soriano (2)	New York Yankees	38	35	
2004	Bobby Abreu (2)	Philadelphia Phillies	30	40	
2004	Carlos Beltrán^{†}	Kansas City Royals; Houston Astros	38	42	
2005	Alfonso Soriano (3)	Texas Rangers	36	30	
2006	Alfonso Soriano (4)	Washington Nationals	46^{&}	41^{&}	
2007	Brandon Phillips	Cincinnati Reds	30	32	
2007	Jimmy Rollins	Philadelphia Phillies	30	41	
2007	David Wright	New York Mets	30	34	
2008	Hanley Ramírez	Florida Marlins	33	35	
2008	Grady Sizemore	Cleveland Indians	33	38	
2009	Ian Kinsler	Texas Rangers	31	30	
2011	Ryan Braun	Milwaukee Brewers	33	33	
2011	Jacoby Ellsbury	Boston Red Sox	32	39	
2011	Matt Kemp	Los Angeles Dodgers	39	40	
2011	Ian Kinsler (2)	Texas Rangers	32	30	
2012	Ryan Braun (2)	Milwaukee Brewers	41	30	
2012	Mike Trout^{‡}	Los Angeles Angels	30	49	
2018	Mookie Betts^{‡}	Boston Red Sox	32	30	
2018	José Ramírez^{‡}	Cleveland Indians	39	34	
2019	Ronald Acuña Jr.^{‡}	Atlanta Braves	41	37	
2019	Christian Yelich^{‡}	Milwaukee Brewers	44	30	
2021	Cedric Mullins^{‡}	Baltimore Orioles	30	30	
2023	Ronald Acuña Jr.^{‡} (2)	Atlanta Braves	41^{&}	73^{&}	
2023	Francisco Lindor^{‡}	New York Mets	31	31	
2023	Julio Rodríguez^{‡}	Seattle Mariners	32	37	
2023	Bobby Witt Jr.^{‡}	Kansas City Royals	30	49	
2024	Shohei Ohtani^{‡}	Los Angeles Dodgers	54^{#}	59^{#}	
2024	José Ramírez^{‡} (2)	Cleveland Guardians	39	41	
2024	Bobby Witt Jr.^{‡} (2)	Kansas City Royals	32	31	
2025	Corbin Carroll^{‡}	Arizona Diamondbacks	31	32	
2025	Jazz Chisholm Jr.^{‡}	New York Yankees	31	31	
2025	Pete Crow-Armstrong^{‡}	Chicago Cubs	31	35	
2025	Francisco Lindor^{‡}(2)	New York Mets	31	31	
2025	José Ramírez^{‡} (3)	Cleveland Guardians	30	44	
2025	Julio Rodríguez^{‡}(2)	Seattle Mariners	32	30	
2025	Juan Soto^{‡}	New York Mets	43	38	
2026	Pete Crow-Armstrong^{‡}(2)	Chicago Cubs	45^{&}	41^{&}	
2026	CJ Abrams^{‡}	Washington Nationals	33	34	
2026	Elly De La Cruz^{‡}	Cincinnati Reds	30	30	

== See also ==
- Baseball statistics
- Triple Crown
- 20–50 club
- 40–40 club
