= 20–50 club =

Accomplishment in baseball

Rickey Henderson reached the 20–50 levels a record four times in his career.

In Major League Baseball (MLB), the 20–50 club is a group of players who exhibit a combination of speed with power by hitting 20 home runs and stealing 50 bases in the same season. The feat has been accomplished 23 times by 15 players. Five of those players have been inducted into the National Baseball Hall of Fame: Craig Biggio, Lou Brock, Rickey Henderson, Joe Morgan and Ryne Sandberg.

Brock became the first player in MLB history with 20 home runs and 50 steals in the same season, hitting 21 home runs and stealing 52 bases with the St. Louis Cardinals in 1967. Henderson reached those levels a record four times; he became the first American League player to join the club in 1985, when he was a member of the New York Yankees. He and Eric Davis are the only players to have 20+ home runs and 80+ steals in the same season. César Cedeño is the only player to have three consecutive seasons (1972–1974) with 20+ home runs and 50+ stolen bases. In 2023, Corbin Carroll of the Arizona Diamondbacks became the first rookie in MLB history with a 20–50 season. Additionally, he was the first player to join the club, veterans included, while also reaching double figures in triples.

The most recent players to join the club were Elly De La Cruz of the Cincinnati Reds and Shohei Ohtani of the Los Angeles Dodgers in 2024. Ohtani was the first player to homer 50 times with 50 steals in the same season. De La Cruz was the third Reds player to enter the 20–50 club, joining Joe Morgan and Eric Davis. The three also reached 20+ homers and 60+ steals, joining a group that also includes Henderson and Ronald Acuña Jr. Acuña, who was the first player to ever reach 20–50 before August 1, became the first to hit 40 homers and steal 70 bases in a single season in 2023. He was the third player to go 20–70, following Henderson and Davis.

== Members ==
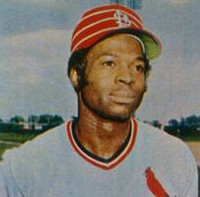
Lou Brock was the first player to reach 20–50 in 1967.

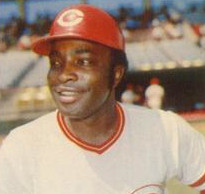
Joe Morgan reached the mark three times, including 20–60 twice.

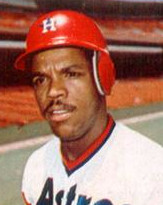
César Cedeño achieved 20–50 in a record three consecutive seasons.

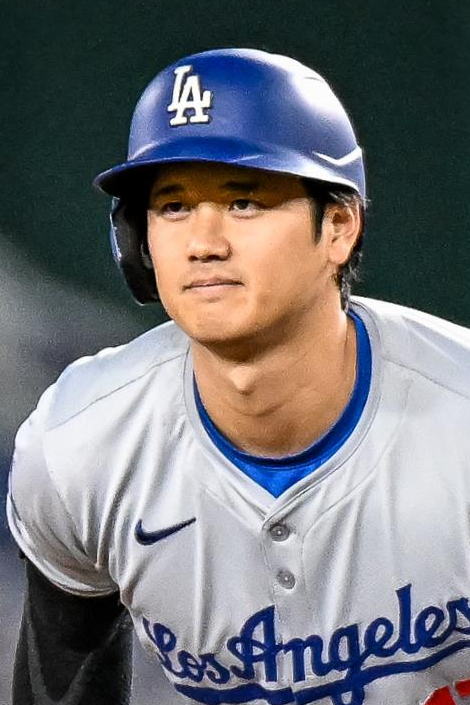
Shohei Ohtani became the first player with a 50–50 season in 2024.

Key
| Year | The year the player's 20–50 season occurred |
| Player | Name of the player |
| Team | The player's team for his 20–50 season |
| HR | Number of home runs in that year |
| SB | Number of stolen bases in that year |
| † | Elected to the Baseball Hall of Fame |
| ‡ | Player is active |

Members of the 20–50 club
| Year | Player | Team | HR | SB | Ref |
|---|---|---|---|---|---|
| 1967 | Lou Brock† | St. Louis Cardinals | 21 | 52 | |
| 1972 | César Cedeño | Houston Astros | 22 | 55 | |
| 1973 | Joe Morgan† | Cincinnati Reds | 26 | 67 | |
| 1973 | César Cedeño | Houston Astros | 25 | 56 | |
| 1974 | César Cedeño | Houston Astros | 26 | 57 | |
| 1974 | Joe Morgan† | Cincinnati Reds | 22 | 58 | |
| 1976 | Joe Morgan† | Cincinnati Reds | 27 | 60 | |
| 1985 | Ryne Sandberg† | Chicago Cubs | 26 | 54 | |
| 1985 | Rickey Henderson† | New York Yankees | 24 | 80 | |
| 1986 | Rickey Henderson† | New York Yankees | 28 | 87 | |
| 1986 | Eric Davis | Cincinnati Reds | 27 | 80 | |
| 1987 | Eric Davis | Cincinnati Reds | 37 | 50 | |
| 1990 | Barry Bonds | Pittsburgh Pirates | 33 | 52 | |
| 1990 | Rickey Henderson† | Oakland A's | 28 | 65 | |
| 1992 | Brady Anderson | Baltimore Orioles | 21 | 53 | |
| 1993 | Rickey Henderson† | Oakland A's / Toronto Blue Jays | 21 | 53 | |
| 1998 | Craig Biggio† | Houston Astros | 20 | 50 | |
| 2007 | Hanley Ramirez | Florida Marlins | 29 | 51 | |
| 2007 | Eric Byrnes | Arizona Diamondbacks | 21 | 50 | |
| 2023 | Ronald Acuña Jr.‡ | Atlanta Braves | 41 | 73 | |
| 2023 | Corbin Carroll‡ | Arizona Diamondbacks | 23 | 54 | |
| 2024 | Shohei Ohtani‡ | Los Angeles Dodgers | 54 | 59 | |
| 2024 | Elly De La Cruz‡ | Cincinnati Reds | 25 | 67 | |

== See also ==
- Baseball statistics
- 20–20–20 club
- 30–30 club
- 40–40 club
