= The Church of Jesus Christ of Latter-day Saints in Honduras =

- Area: Central America
- Members: 197,073 (2025)
- Stakes: 31
- Districts: 5
- Wards: 180
- Branches: 62
- Total congregations: 242
- Missions: 4
- Temples: 2 operating
- FamilySearch Centers: 89

The Church of Jesus Christ of Latter-day Saints in Honduras refers to the Church of Jesus Christ of Latter-day Saints (LDS Church) and its members in Honduras. The first branch (small congregation) was formed in 1953. As of December 31, 2025, there were 197,073 members in 242 congregations in Honduras. Honduras had the third most LDS Church members per capita in North America, behind the United States and El Salvador.

== History ==
Membership in Honduras
Year	Membership
1960	411
1970*	3,000
1979	6,624
1989*	29,000
1999	99,750
2009	131,098
2019	180,646
2025	197,073
*Membership was published as an estimated number. Source: Wendall J. Ashton; Jim M. Wall, Deseret News, various years, Church Almanac Country Information: Honduras

A brief history can be found at LDS Newsroom (Honduras) or Deseret News 2010 Church Almanac (Honduras)

== Stakes and districts ==
As of July 2026, Honduras had the following stakes and districts:

Stake/District	Organized	Mission	Temple
Choloma Honduras Stake	15 Dec 2013	Honduras San Pedro Sula West	San Pedro Sula Honduras
Choluteca Honduras Porvenir Stake	16 Dec 2012	Honduras Tegucigalpa	Tegucigalpa Honduras
Choluteca Honduras Stake	21 May 1995	Honduras Tegucigalpa	Tegucigalpa Honduras
Comayagua Honduras Stake	17 Dec 1995	Honduras Comayagüela	Tegucigalpa Honduras
Comayagüela Honduras Bulevar Stake	24 Jul 2016	Honduras Comayagüela	Tegucigalpa Honduras
Comayaguela Honduras Country Stake	3 Sep 1995	Honduras Comayagüela	Tegucigalpa Honduras
Comayaguela Honduras Stake	21 Nov 1982	Honduras Comayagüela	Tegucigalpa Honduras
Comayagüela Honduras Torocagua Stake	4 Sep 1994	Honduras Comayagüela	Tegucigalpa Honduras
Danli Honduras Stake	26 Feb 1995	Honduras Tegucigalpa	Tegucigalpa Honduras
El Carmen Honduras Stake	26 Jun 2016	Honduras San Pedro Sula East	San Pedro Sula Honduras
El Merendón Honduras Stake	17 Jun 1990	Honduras San Pedro Sula West	San Pedro Sula Honduras
El Progreso Honduras Stake	25 Aug 1996	Honduras San Pedro Sula East	San Pedro Sula Honduras
Fesitranh Honduras Stake	11 Jun 1995	Honduras San Pedro Sula West	San Pedro Sula Honduras
Gulf of Fonseca Honduras Stake	31 May 2026	Honduras Tegucigalpa	Tegucigalpa Honduras
Intibuca Honduras District	12 May 2024	Honduras Comayagüela	Tegucigalpa Honduras
Juticalpa Honduras District	7 Mar 1995	Honduras Comayagüela	Tegucigalpa Honduras
La Ceiba Honduras Miramar Stake	4 Dec 2016	Honduras San Pedro Sula East	San Pedro Sula Honduras
La Ceiba Honduras Stake	28 Jun 1987	Honduras San Pedro Sula East	San Pedro Sula Honduras
La Lima Honduras Stake	22 Jun 1986	Honduras San Pedro Sula East	San Pedro Sula Honduras
Olanchito Honduras Stake	19 Jun 1985	Honduras San Pedro Sula East	San Pedro Sula Honduras
Palermo Honduras Stake	24 Jan 2016	Honduras San Pedro Sula East	San Pedro Sula Honduras
Potrerillos Honduras Stake	16 Jul 2017	Honduras San Pedro Sula West	San Pedro Sula Honduras
San Pedro Sula Honduras Stake	10 Apr 1977	Honduras San Pedro Sula West	San Pedro Sula Honduras
Santa Rosa de Copan Honduras Stake	19 Apr 2026	Honduras San Pedro Sula West	San Pedro Sula Honduras
Satélite Honduras Stake	18 Feb 1996	Honduras San Pedro Sula East	San Pedro Sula Honduras
Tegucigalpa Honduras Guaymuras Stake	28 Jan 1989	Honduras Tegucigalpa	Tegucigalpa Honduras
Tegucigalpa Honduras La Esperanza Stake	10 Sep 1995	Honduras Tegucigalpa	Tegucigalpa Honduras
Tegucigalpa Honduras Loarque Stake	15 May 2011	Honduras Comayagüela	Tegucigalpa Honduras
Tegucigalpa Honduras Roble Oeste Stake	29 Jan 2017	Honduras Comayagüela	Tegucigalpa Honduras
Tegucigalpa Honduras Stake	30 Jul 1978	Honduras Tegucigalpa	Tegucigalpa Honduras
Tegucigalpa Honduras Toncontín Stake	2 Sep 1990	Honduras Comayagüela	Tegucigalpa Honduras
Tegucigalpa Honduras Uyuca Stake	26 May 1996	Honduras Tegucigalpa	Tegucigalpa Honduras
Tegucigalpa Honduras Villa Olímpica Stake	25 Jun 2017	Honduras Tegucigalpa	Tegucigalpa Honduras
Valle de Sula Honduras Stake	2 Jul 1989	Honduras San Pedro Sula West	San Pedro Sula Honduras
Villa Nueva Honduras Stake	9 Mar 1997	Honduras San Pedro Sula West	San Pedro Sula Honduras

== Missions ==
Mission	Organized
Honduras Comayaguela	1 Jul 1997
Honduras San Pedro Sul East	1 Jul 1990
Honduras San Pedro Sul West	1 Jul 2013
Honduras Tegucigalpa	1 Feb 1980

== Temples ==
Temples in Honduras
Red = Operating
Yellow = Announced
Blue = Under Construction
Black = Closed for Renovations

The Tegucigalpa Honduras Temple was dedicated on 17 March 2013. A second temple, located in San Pedro Sula, is under construction.

141. Tegucigalpa Honduras Temple; Official website; News & images	
Location: Announced: Groundbreaking: Dedicated: Size: Notes:	Comayagüela, Honduras; 9 June 2006 by Gordon B. Hinckley; 12 September 2009 by Don R. Clarke; 17 March 2013 by Dieter F. Uchtdorf; 28,254 sq ft (2,624.9 m^{2}) on a 13.6-acre (5.5 ha) site Ground was broken in a small ceremony on 12 September 2009 after a new site was selected. Previously ground had been broken on 9 June 2007 by Spencer V. Jones, excavation was halted because of opposition from Tegucigalpa city officials and citizens, who felt the temple would overshadow and block the view of the Catholic Our Lady of Suyapa Basilica on adjacent land. After negotiations failed to resolve the issue, the church announced on Wednesday, 28 January 2009, that out of respect for the city officials and citizens, the church would relocate the temple.
198. San Pedro Sula Honduras Temple; Official website; News & images	
Location: Announced: Groundbreaking: Dedicated: Size:	San Pedro Sula, Honduras; 7 April 2019 by Russell M. Nelson; 5 September 2020 by José Hernández; 13 October 2024 by Dale G. Renlund; 35,818 sq ft (3,327.6 m^{2}) on a 9-acre (3.6 ha) site

== See also ==
- Religion in Honduras
