= The Church of Jesus Christ of Latter-day Saints in El Salvador =

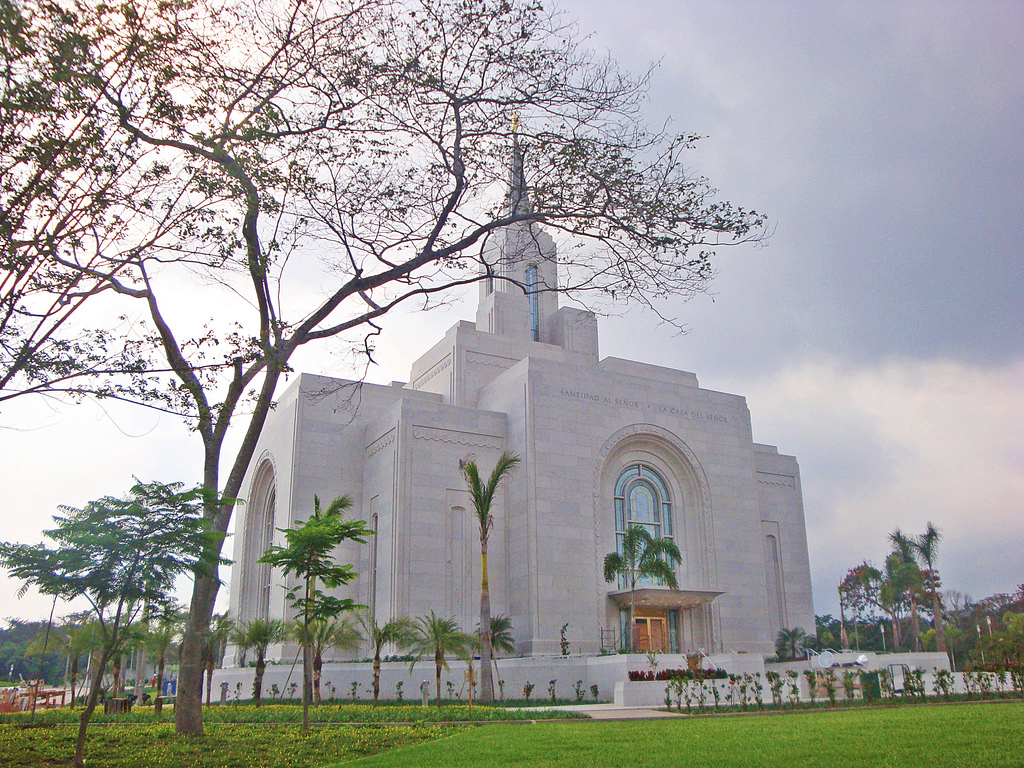
- The San Salvador El Salvador Temple
- Area: Central America
- Members: 132,399 (2025)
- Stakes: 22
- Wards: 126
- Branches: 28
- Total congregations: 154
- Missions: 3
- Temples: 1 operating; 1 announced; 2 total
- FamilySearch Centers: 52

The Church of Jesus Christ of Latter-day Saints in El Salvador refers to the Church of Jesus Christ of Latter-day Saints (LDS Church) and its members in El Salvador. On March 2, 1951, the first 12 converts in El Salvador were baptized. As of December 31, 2025, there were 132,399 members in 154 congregations in El Salvador. In 2019, El Salvador had the second most LDS Church members per capita in North America, after the United States.

== History ==
Membership in El Salvador
Year	Membership
1960	311
1970	9,961
1979	15,529
1989*	32,000
1999	84,683
2009	102,043
2019	128,881
2025	132,399
*Membership was published as a rounded number. Source: Wendall J. Ashton; Jim M. Wall, Deseret News, various years, Church Almanac Country Information: El Salvador

In 1948, Arwell L. Pierce, president of the Mexican Mission assigned the first missionaries to preach in El Salvador. In February 1951, a conference was held in San Salvador with church apostle Albert E. Bowen in attendance. One month later, the first converts were baptized at Apulo Beach at Lake Ilopango. In 1965, there were 4,200 members in El Salvador. By 1989, the church in El Salvador was able to use local members called to serve to sustain its missionary force. Church membership grew from the initial converts, and was up to 15,000 by the mid-1980s before growing to 38,000 and further doubling by 2000.

== Stakes ==
Stake	Organized	Mission
Ahuachapán El Salvador El Espino Stake	19 Nov 2017	El Salvador Santa Ana
Ahuachapán El Salvador Stake	22 Sep 1991	El Salvador Santa Ana
Apopa El Salvador Stake	20 Oct 1996	El Salvador San Salvador East
Atiquizaya El Salvador Stake	11 Aug 1996	El Salvador Santa Ana
Chalchuapa El Salvador Stake	29 Oct 1995	El Salvador Santa Ana
Juayua El Salvador Stake	12 Nov 1995	El Salvador Santa Ana
Paraiso El Salvador Stake	14 Jun 2009	El Salvador Santa Ana
San Miguel El Salvador Stake	11 Jan 1981	El Salvador San Salvador East
San Salvador El Salvador Stake	3 Jun 1973	El Salvador San Salvador East
San Salvador El Salvador Cuzcatlan Stake	3 Jun 1979	El Salvador San Salvador West
San Salvador El Salvador Ilopango Stake	1 Feb 1976	El Salvador San Salvador East
San Salvador El Salvador La Libertad Stake	22 Oct 1995	El Salvador San Salvador West
San Salvador El Salvador Layco Stake	22 Sep 1996	El Salvador San Salvador West
San Salvador El Salvador Los Heroes Stake	8 Apr 1990	El Salvador San Salvador West
San Salvador El Salvador Soyapango Stake	8 Apr 1990	El Salvador San Salvador East
San Vicente El Salvador Stake	26 Feb 1995	El Salvador San Salvador East
Santa Ana El Salvador Los Pinos Stake	10 Dec 2017	El Salvador Santa Ana
Santa Ana El Salvador Modelo Stake	14 Dec 1980	El Salvador Santa Ana
Santa Ana El Salvador Molino Stake	2 Dec 1979	El Salvador Santa Ana
Sonsonate El Salvador Stake	22 Sep 1991	El Salvador San Salvador West
Sonzacate El Salvador Stake	12 Jun 2011	El Salvador San Salvador West
Usulután El Salvador Stake	17 Apr 1994	El Salvador San Salvador East

== Missions ==
Mission	Organized
El Salvador Santa Ana	1 Jul 1976
El Salvador San Salvador East	1 Jul 2013
El Salvador San Salvador West	1 Jul 1990

== Temples ==
Temples in El Salvador
Red = Operating
Blue = Under Construction
Yellow = announced
Black = Closed for Renovations

The San Salvador El Salvador Temple was announced on November 7, 2007 by the First Presidency. Ground was broken for the temple in September 2008, and was dedicated on August 21, 2011 by Henry B. Eyring of the First Presidency.

135. San Salvador El Salvador Temple; Official website; News & images	
Location: Announced: Groundbreaking: Dedicated: Size: Notes:	Antiguo Cuscatlán, El Salvador; 18 November 2007 by Gordon B. Hinckley; 20 September 2008 by Don R. Clarke; 21 August 2011 by Henry B. Eyring; 27,986 sq ft (2,600.0 m^{2}) on a 6.5-acre (2.6 ha) site Announced in a letter dated 7 November 2007 from the First Presidency to priesthood leaders. The public open house was held from Friday, 1 July 2011, until Saturday, 23 July 2011, following which the temple was dedicated on Sunday, 21 August 2011, in three sessions.
354. Santa Ana El Salvador Temple (Announced); Official website; News & images	
Location: Announced:	Santa Ana, El Salvador; 6 October 2024 by Russell M. Nelson

== See also ==
- Religion in El Salvador
