= Tegucigalpa Honduras Temple =

LDS Church temple in Honduras

- Interactive map of Tegucigalpa Honduras Temple
- Number: 141
- Dedication: 17 March 2013, by Dieter F. Uchtdorf
- Site: 13.6 acres (5.5 ha)
- Floor area: 28,254 ft^{2} (2,624.9 m^{2})
- Height: 135 ft (41 m)
- Official website • News & images

Church chronology
← Calgary Alberta Temple	Tegucigalpa Honduras Temple	→ Gilbert Arizona Temple

Additional information
- Announced: 9 June 2006, by Gordon B. Hinckley
- Groundbreaking: 12 September 2009, by Don R. Clarke
- Open house: 9 February – 2 March 2013
- Current president: Nery Rodriguez
- Location: Comayagüela, Honduras
- Coordinates: 14°3′9.216″N 87°14′15.4716″W
- Exterior finish: Mountain gray granite from China
- Baptistries: 1
- Ordinance rooms: 2 (two-stage progressive)
- Sealing rooms: 2
- Notes: Ground was broken in a small ceremony on 12 September 2009 after a new site was selected. Previously ground had been broken on 9 June 2007 by Spencer V. Jones, excavation was halted because of opposition from Tegucigalpa city officials and citizens, who felt the temple would overshadow and block the view of the Catholic Our Lady of Suyapa Basilica on adjacent land. After negotiations failed to resolve the issue, the church announced on Wednesday, 28 January 2009, that out of respect for the city officials and citizens, the church would relocate the temple.

The Tegucigalpa Honduras Temple is a temple of the Church of Jesus Christ of Latter-day Saints located in Tegucigalpa, the capital city of Honduras. It is the first temple constructed in the country and the sixth built in Central America. The temple was announced on June 9, 2006, by the First Presidency. A groundbreaking ceremony was initially held on June 9, 2007, at a site near the Universidad Nacional Autónoma de Honduras, but due to civic concerns, construction was relocated, and a second groundbreaking occurred on September 12, 2009, near Toncontín International Airport. The temple was dedicated in three sessions on March 17, 2013, by Dieter F. Uchtdorf, second counselor in the First Presidency.

Designed by VCBO Architecture, the two-story building was designed using Mesoamerican influences and the exterior is gray granite. Its decorative elements include native orchid motifs and lattice patterns. The temple contains two ordinance rooms, two sealing rooms, and a baptistry, and is on a landscaped 13.6-acre site lined with palm trees. During the 2013 public open house, more than 100,000 visitors toured the temple, and a cultural celebration featuring 4,100 youth was held prior to the dedication.

== History ==
The temple was announced by the First Presidency on June 9, 2006. Local members were given the news of the announcement by Spencer V. Jones, a member of the Seventy and president of the Central America Area, during a visit to Honduras. At that time, members in Tegucigalpa would travel over 12 hours to reach the nearest temple in Guatemala City.

The original site, adjacent to the institute building at the Universidad Nacional Autónoma de Honduras, was dedicated and a ceremonial groundbreaking was held on June 9, 2007, presided over by Spencer V. Jones. According to the auxiliary bishop of the Tegucigalpa Catholic Archdiocese, Bishop Darwin Rudy Andino Ramirez, government officials and residents in the area saw the temple being built near the Our Lady of Suyapa Basilica as a provocation. After months of negotiations with the mayorship, the church did not get approval. Wanting to avoid appearing to compete with the Catholic Church, church leadership opted instead to move the temple site.

Subsequently, on September 12, 2009, a second groundbreaking occurred at the new location near the Toncontín International Airport in Residencial Roble Oeste on a 13.6-acre property. This ceremony was more private, attended by invited priesthood leaders and area leaders, and included a display of an architectural rendering of the new temple.

Initial plans were for a building of approximately 28,254 square feet (2,625 m²), with gray granite from China on the exterior, along with two ordinance rooms, two sealing rooms, and one baptistry. The grounds featured flowerbeds, vegetation common to Honduras, and grass fields lined with palm trees.

After construction was completed, a public open house was held from February 9 through March 2, 2013, with more than 100,000 visitors touring the temple during the first two weeks. A cultural celebration featuring around 4,100 youth performing traditional Honduran song and dance was held on March 16, 2013, attended by government dignitaries including President Porfirio Lobo Sosa, First Lady Rosa Elenea de Lobo, and cabinet officials.

The Tegucigalpa Honduras Temple was dedicated on March 17, 2013, by Dieter F. Uchtdorf, second counselor in the First Presidency, in three dedicatory sessions. It became the first in Honduras, the 141st operating temple of the church, and the sixth in Central America, serving approximately 233,000 members in Honduras and Nicaragua.

== Design and architecture ==
The Tegucigalpa Honduras Temple uses a modern temple design with Meso-American and Mayan influences, incorporating heavy stone massing and motifs inspired by regional traditions. The temple is on a 13.6-acre plot in the Residencial Roble Oeste neighborhood near Toncontín International Airport. The grounds are landscaped with grass lawns, palm trees, flowerbeds, and vegetation typical of Honduras.

The two-story structure is 28,254 square feet and is constructed of mountain-gray granite quarried in China, giving it a light-grey façade. A single, multilevel central spire topped by a golden statue of the angel Moroni rises above the temple.

Motifs influenced by Honduran culture—such as lattice patterns and orchid carvings (the national flower, Rhyncholaelia digbyana)—appear in the window grilles, carved furniture, and decorative lighting fixtures, uniting local aesthetic with ecclesiastical décor.

Inside, the temple contains two ordinance rooms, two sealing rooms, and a baptistry. The interior design continues the orchid and lattice motifs, visible in furniture details, like the exterior themes.[10] The baptismal font has twelve oxen sculptures.

The temple's public open house in early 2013 drew significant local interest, with more than 100,000 visitors touring the building during the first two weeks. Prior to the dedication, a large cultural celebration featuring around 4,100 youth performing traditional Honduran music and dance was held, with government dignitaries attending to expand interfaith visibility in the community.

== Temple presidents and admittance ==
=== Temple presidents ===
The church's temples are directed by a temple president and matron, each typically serving for a term of three years. The president and matron oversee the administration of temple operations and provide guidance and training for both temple patrons and staff.

Serving from 2013 to 2015, Roberto O. Reyes was the first president, with Dina Irene Mejía de Ocampo serving as matron.. As of 2025, Nery R. López is the president, with María Olivia de Rodríguez serving as matron.

=== Admittance ===
On December 12, 2012, the church announced the public open house that was held from February 9 to March 2, 2013. The temple was dedicated by Dieter F. Uchtdorf on March 17, 2013, in three sessions. Like all the church's temples, it is not used for Sunday worship services. To members of the church, temples are regarded as sacred houses of the Lord. Once dedicated, only church members with a current temple recommend can enter for worship.

== See also ==

Temples in Central America
= Operating
= Under construction
= Announced
= Temporarily Closed

- Comparison of temples of The Church of Jesus Christ of Latter-day Saints
- List of temples of The Church of Jesus Christ of Latter-day Saints
- List of temples of The Church of Jesus Christ of Latter-day Saints by geographic region
- Temple architecture (Latter-day Saints)
- The Church of Jesus Christ of Latter-day Saints in Honduras
