= Steve Young =

American football player (born 1961)

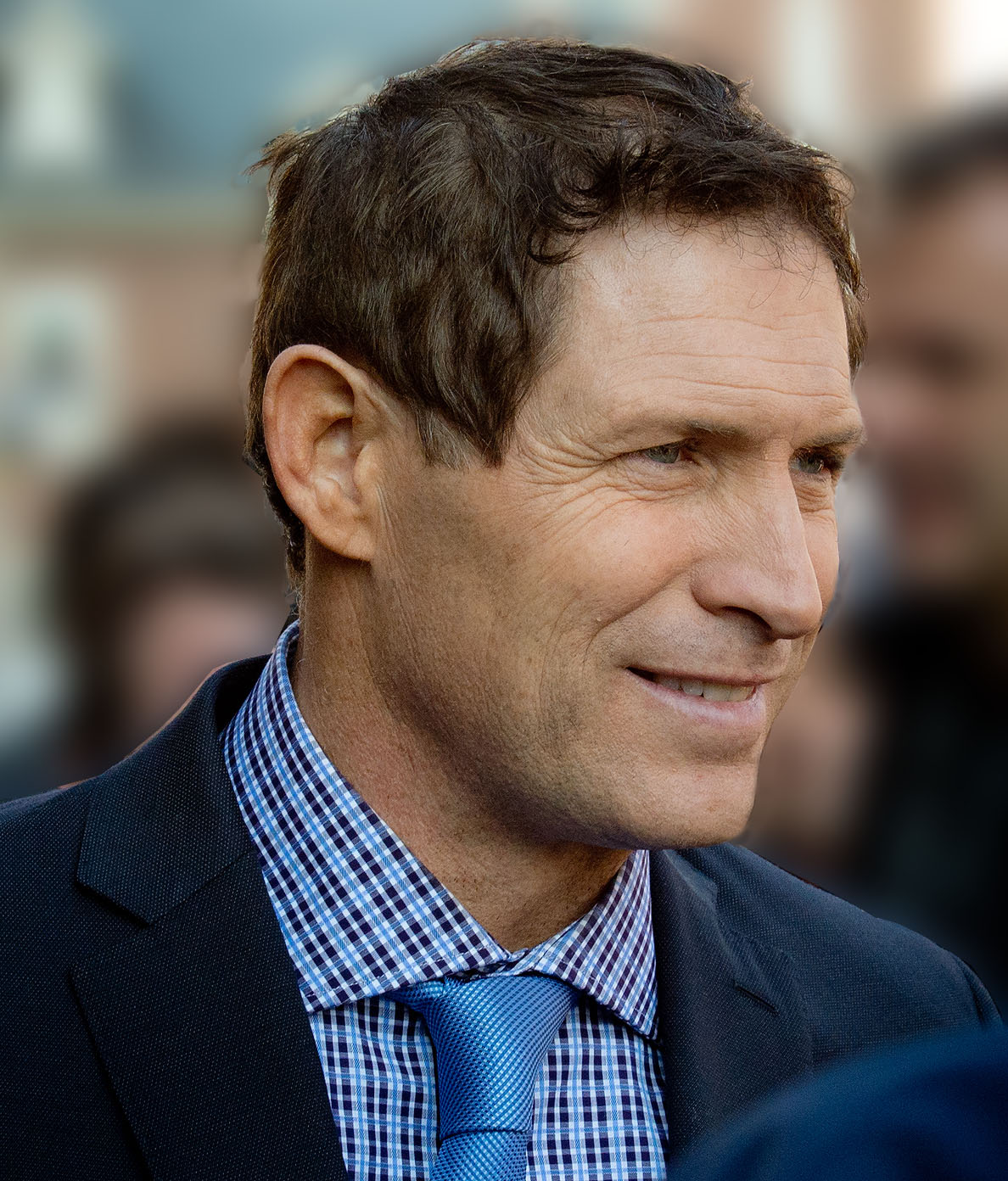
- Young in 2012

No. 8
- Position: Quarterback

Personal information
- Born: October 11, 1961 (age 65); Salt Lake City, Utah, U.S.
- Listed height: 6 ft 2 in (1.88 m)
- Listed weight: 215 lb (98 kg)

Career information
- High school: Greenwich (Greenwich, Connecticut)
- College: BYU (1980–1983)
- Supplemental draft: 1984: 1st round, 1st overall pick

Career history
- Los Angeles Express (1984–1985); Tampa Bay Buccaneers (1985–1986); San Francisco 49ers (1987–1999)

Awards and highlights
- 3× Super Bowl champion (XXIII, XXIV, XXIX); Super Bowl MVP (XXIX); 2× NFL Most Valuable Player (1992, 1994); NFL Offensive Player of the Year (1992); 2× UPI NFC Offensive Player of the Year (1992, 1994); 3× First-team All-Pro (1992–1994); 3× Second-team All-Pro (1995, 1997, 1998); 7× Pro Bowl (1992–1998); 4× NFL passing touchdowns leader (1992–1994, 1998); 6× NFL passer rating leader (1991–1994, 1996, 1997); 5× NFL completion percentage leader (1992, 1994–1997); San Francisco 49ers Hall of Fame; San Francisco 49ers No. 8 retired; Davey O'Brien Award (1983); Sammy Baugh Trophy (1983); Unanimous All-American (1983); NCAA passing yards leader (1983); NCAA passing touchdowns leader (1983); NCAA passer rating leader (1983); NCAA completion percentage leader (1983); 2× WAC Offensive Player of the Year (1982, 1983); BYU Cougars No. 8 retired

Career NFL statistics
- Passing attempts: 4,149
- Passing completions: 2,667
- Completion percentage: 64.3%
- TD–INT: 232–107
- Passing yards: 33,124
- Passer rating: 96.8
- Rushing yards: 4,239
- Rushing touchdowns: 43
- Stats at Pro Football Reference
- Pro Football Hall of Fame
- College Football Hall of Fame

Jon Steven Young (born October 11, 1961) is an American former professional football quarterback who played in the National Football League (NFL) for 15 seasons, primarily with the San Francisco 49ers. A three time Super Bowl champion and two time NFL Most Valuable Player, Young is widely regarded as one of the greatest quarterbacks of all time. He previously played for the Tampa Bay Buccaneers, who drafted him in 1984. Prior to his NFL career, Young played for the Los Angeles Express of the United States Football League (USFL) for two seasons. He played college football for the BYU Cougars, setting school and NCAA records. In 2001, Young was inducted into the College Football Hall of Fame. He joined the Pro Football Hall of Fame in 2005.

Young left the fledgling USFL after the 1985 season to join the Buccaneers. Two seasons of underwhelming play led Tampa Bay to trade him to the 49ers in 1987. A quarterback controversy ensued as he spent several seasons backing up starting quarterback Joe Montana, who had previously led San Francisco to two Super Bowl championships and would quarterback two more Super Bowl wins. Young became the 49ers' full-time starting quarterback in 1991. He was named the AP's NFL Most Valuable Player in 1992 and 1994, and was the MVP of Super Bowl XXIX where he led the 49ers to a victory over the San Diego Chargers with a record six touchdown passes. During his 1994 MVP campaign, Young set a new NFL record for passer rating at 112.8. He is a member of the College Football Hall of Fame and the Pro Football Hall of Fame.

Young was an extremely efficient passer, leading the league in passer rating a record six times and completion percentage and yards per attempt five times. At the time of his retirement, Young had the highest passer rating among NFL quarterbacks with at least 1,500 passing attempts (96.8). As of 2025, he was ranked fourteenth all time in passer rating, and was ranked fourth-highest amongst retired players, behind only Drew Brees, Tom Brady, and Tony Romo. Young's 43 career rushing touchdowns are fourth among quarterbacks, while his 4,239 rushing yards ranks sixth all time.

== Early life ==
Born in Salt Lake City, Utah, Young attended Eastern Middle School, and Greenwich High School in Greenwich, Connecticut, where he played quarterback on its Cardinals football team.

Young earned 1978 All-FCIAC West Division First Team honors in his junior year, his first year as a starter. In his senior year, Young rushed for 13 touchdowns and earned All-FCIAC West Division First Team honors, and was named to the CIAC All-State team. In the rush-first option offense run by Greenwich, he completed only 41 percent of his throws for 1,220 yards, but ran the ball 267 times for 1,928 yards. On Thanksgiving Day in November 1979, Greenwich lost to Darien High School, known for its "Tidal Wave Defense", 17–0. During his senior year, Young was co-captain of the football, basketball, and baseball teams. In basketball, he averaged 15 points a game. In baseball, Young hit .384 and played center field when he was not pitching. Young was 5–1 and threw a 3–0 no-hitter against New Canaan High School.

== College career ==
Young was heavily recruited by the University of North Carolina. Coach Dick Crum was enamored of Young's running ability, and wanted him to run his option offense. Young instead chose BYU. Initially, he struggled at throwing the ball, and BYU's coaching staff considered switching him to defensive back because of his athleticism. However, Young worked hard to improve his passing skills and eventually succeeded record-setting Jim McMahon as BYU's starting quarterback. In his senior season, Young led the nation in passing yards (3,902), passing touchdowns (33), passer rating, and his 71.3% completion percentage set an NCAA single-season record. Young also added 544 yards rushing. With Young at quarterback, BYU set an NCAA record by averaging 584.2 yards of total offense per game, with 370.5 of those yards coming from his passing and rushing. The Cougars finished the year with an impressive 11–1 record; Young was named a unanimous All-American and received the Davey O'Brien National Quarterback Award, which recognizes the nation's best collegiate quarterback each year. He also finished second in voting for the Heisman Trophy, behind Nebraska running back Mike Rozier. Young capped his college career by scoring the game-winning touchdown on a pass from the halfback in BYU's 21–17 victory over Missouri in the 1983 Holiday Bowl.

Young finished his college career with 592 pass completions for 7,733 yards and 56 touchdowns, along with 1,048 rushing yards and 18 touchdowns. He was enshrined in the College Football Hall of Fame in 2001.

== Professional football ==
Pre-draft measurables
Height	Weight	40-yard dash	Wonderlic
6 ft 0 1/2 in (1.84 m)	205 lb (93 kg)	4.55 s	33
All values from NFL Draft/scouting report

At the time Young left college the USFL was proving a serious challenge to the established NFL, and he had a choice to be a top pick in either league.

=== Los Angeles Express ===
Young was selected by the USFL Los Angeles Express in the first round (11th overall) of the 1984 draft held that January. Express general manager Don Klosterman told Young that if he signed with the Express, his head coach would be John Hadl, a former All-Pro quarterback who had shepherded John Elway through his first year in the NFL. Klosterman also told Young that Hall of Fame coach Sid Gillman, who had been hired as a consultant, would tutor him on how to be a pro quarterback.

The regular 1984 NFL draft would not be held until May. To help influence his decision, the Express offered an all-sports record 10-year, $40 million contract. Young was convinced, and signed with the Express in March 1984. He agreed to take his payment in the form of an annuity paid out over forty years to help the fledgling team. (Note: Three months later, in June of 1984, the NFL held a Special supplementary draft of USFL and CFL players who'd already signed contracts with those teams (just in case the USFL folded, so there would not be a scramble to sign its new talent as free agents, potentially setting off a huge bidding war among NFL teams). The Cincinnati Bengals, three years removed from a Super Bowl appearance, had already selected quarterback Boomer Esiason with the 10th pick of the 2nd round (38th overall) in the regular May draft. They traded their #1 pick in the supplementary draft to the then-moribund Tampa Bay Buccaneers, which took Young. This is how Young later ended up starting his NFL career with Tampa Bay.)

After missing the first six games of his rookie season while taking some college classes in order to graduate on time, Young started the final 12 games. He had a respectable year, highlighted by becoming the first pro football player ever to pass for 300 yards and rush for 100 in a single game.

Despite a roster which included future NFL players such as Jojo Townsell, Mel Gray, and Kevin Nelson, and making the Western Conference title game in Young's first season, the Express were never able to create a sustaining fan base in Los Angeles. They often played to sparse crowds that looked even more so in the then-95,000-seat Los Angeles Memorial Coliseum.

Near the end of the 1984 season, Express owner J. William Oldenburg was forced to give up control of the team after multiple reports revealed he had misrepresented his net worth. Houston Gamblers minority owner Jay Roulier was cleared to buy the team, only to be pushed out shortly before the 1985 preseason when it emerged that he too had lied about his finances. For all intents and purposes, the Express' 1985 season ended at that point. The league took over the team and cut the budget to the bare minimum. Notably, no money was allocated to replace injured players. This left the Express in a precarious position when a rash of injuries decimated the roster. Even before then, Young and the other young players concluded that the Express would not be around for the planned move to a fall schedule in 1986, even if the USFL survived. With this in mind, they played tentatively so as not to harm their NFL prospects. As a result, despite fielding essentially the same team as a year prior, the Express cratered to a 3–15 record.

Before the Express' final home game — which had been moved to Los Angeles Pierce College in the San Fernando Valley — the bus driver refused to leave unless he was paid up front, in cash. Young contributed some money, as did the team trainer, and the driver took them to the game. In the season finale at Orlando, Young had to line up at tailback because the Express had no healthy running backs left on the roster.

It was reported that Young had insured his contract and would still be paid until 2027. However, facing the prospect of both a faltering owner and an unstable league, Young had already renegotiated his 10-year deal down to 4 years, and had already collected a total of $4.8 million of the $5.8 million due in total through the final year of that deal (in 1987), working out to an annual rate of pay of $2.4 million for his first two seasons that was the highest in all of American sports. (Note: Three Major League Baseball players, Mike Schmidt, Ozzie Smith and Dave Winfield, were next at $2.1 million annually.) Included in that negotiation was a payment of $1.4 million for the balance of the 10-year annuity (less money paid out against it), and salaries for the remaining two years of the deal "in excess of $450,000" annually according the USFL Commissioner then overseeing the LA Express (which had fallen into receivership).

=== Tampa Bay Buccaneers ===
Young grew increasingly dissatisfied with the disarray surrounding the Express. Just a week before what proved to be the last USFL title game, Young gave the USFL an ultimatum – find a new owner for the Express, or allow him to buy out his contract and go to the NFL. Soon after the league decided to suspend the Express's operations for the 1986 season, Young bought out his Express contract and signed with the Tampa Bay Buccaneers, who had made him the first pick in a supplemental draft of USFL and CFL players a year earlier.

By this time, the Buccaneers were in the midst of what would be 12 consecutive 10-loss seasons. They posted identical 2–14 records in Young's two seasons with them, going 3–16 with him as a starter. Young threw for only 11 touchdowns with 21 interceptions while completing fewer than 55% of his passes.

=== San Francisco 49ers ===
The Buccaneers selected University of Miami quarterback Vinny Testaverde first overall in the 1987 NFL draft because Young was deemed a bust. Young was traded to the San Francisco 49ers on April 24, 1987, to serve as a backup to Joe Montana. 49ers coach Bill Walsh was impressed by Young's natural abilities, and believed his lackluster numbers were primarily due to the lack of talent around him in Tampa Bay.

The Buccaneers received second and fourth round draft picks in the trade, which they used to draft Miami linebacker Winston Moss and Arizona State wide receiver Bruce Hill, respectively.

==== Montana's backup: 1987–1990 ====
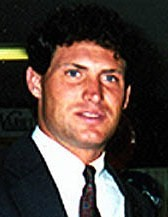
Young in 1990

Young played behind Montana for four years, but shone as a backup. Substituting for an injured Montana, early in the first quarter of a 1987 game against the Chicago Bears, Young threw four touchdown passes in a 41–0 victory. In their 1987 divisional playoff game against the Minnesota Vikings, he replaced Montana in the second half after the team fell behind 27–10. The 49ers still lost the game, but Young had a good performance, completing 12 of 17 pass attempts for 158 yards, a touchdown, and an interception while also leading San Francisco in rushing with 72 yards and a touchdown on six carries.

On October 30, 1988, Young ran for a 49-yard, game-winning touchdown against the Minnesota Vikings. It was the longest run by a 49ers quarterback until 2012 with a 56-yard run by Colin Kaepernick. Young started the game out with a 73-yard touchdown pass to John Taylor, after Montana went down with an injury. The play earned the 49ers a 24–21 victory and a bit of revenge on the Vikings for their previous season's playoff loss. The win turned out to be crucial. Without it, the 49ers would have finished the season 9–7 and missed the playoffs. Two other teams in their division, the Los Angeles Rams and New Orleans Saints, had 10–6 records. Instead, the 49ers won their division, earned the #2 playoff seed, and went on to win the Super Bowl.

In 1989, Young displayed potential to become the team's starter in the future. While Montana won the NFL MVP award and led the team to a victory in Super Bowl XXIV, Young had a good season, completing 69% of his passes for 1,001 yards, eight touchdowns, and only three interceptions. On October 22, 1989, he posted a perfect passer rating of 158.3 when he completed 11 of 12 passes for 188 yards and three touchdown passes in a 37–20 victory over the New England Patriots.

Young rushed for a career-high 102 yards on just eight carries against the New Orleans Saints on December 23, 1990, making him only the second 49ers quarterback to rush for at least 100 yards in a single game. The 49ers lost the game 13–10.

In his four seasons as a backup, Young threw 23 touchdown passes and only six interceptions.

Young said of his relationship with Montana; "I will say this about Joe: Joe's a good dude. We got along. We played golf, we laughed, we did a lot of things together. But it was always awkward. There's a great commercial AT&T did a few years ago called ‘Awkward,’ where Joe and I come to Bo Jackson's house and he comes in unannounced. We have this weird interaction." Young has admitted "It's been awkward. It's always been awkward. And I think it'll always be awkward, because we both wanted to be super successful and there's only one job. And yet, we never argued. I never had a cross word with him. We never had it out, because there's nothing to have out. It's just awkward."

==== 1991 season ====
Following an injury to Montana's elbow in the 1990 NFC Championship Game, which forced him to miss the entire 1991 season, Young got his chance to lead the 49ers, but got off to a rough start. Midway through the season, the 49ers found themselves struggling with a 4–4 record. In the ninth game of the season, after throwing a franchise-record 97-yard touchdown pass to Taylor, Young suffered a knee injury and was replaced by backup quarterback Steve Bono. After a loss in that game and the next, Bono led the 49ers to five consecutive victories, playing so well that coach George Seifert decided to keep him in the starting lineup after Young had recovered. It was not until late in the 15th game of the season, after Bono went down with an injury of his own, that Young got to play again. Young then closed out the season by throwing for 338 yards and three touchdowns and also rushing for 63 yards and another touchdown in a 52–14 win over the Chicago Bears in a Monday Night Football game at Candlestick Park.

Young finished the season with an NFL best 101.8 passer rating. Despite missing five full games and most of a sixth, he still threw for 2,517 yards, 17 touchdowns, and only eight interceptions. Despite Young's strong season, the season for the team was widely regarded as a disappointment. The 49ers had slipped from a 14–2 record in the previous season to a 10–6 record in 1991. Ten wins, while usually being enough to grant a playoff spot for a team, kept the 49ers just short of the playoffs, and San Francisco ended up not playing in the postseason for the first time since 1982. It was thought by many that Young's days as the 49ers starter were numbered due to the impending return of Montana from the injury to his right elbow, and some observers said the 49ers should trade Young and keep Montana and Bono. However, the trade never happened.

==== 1992 season: First MVP ====
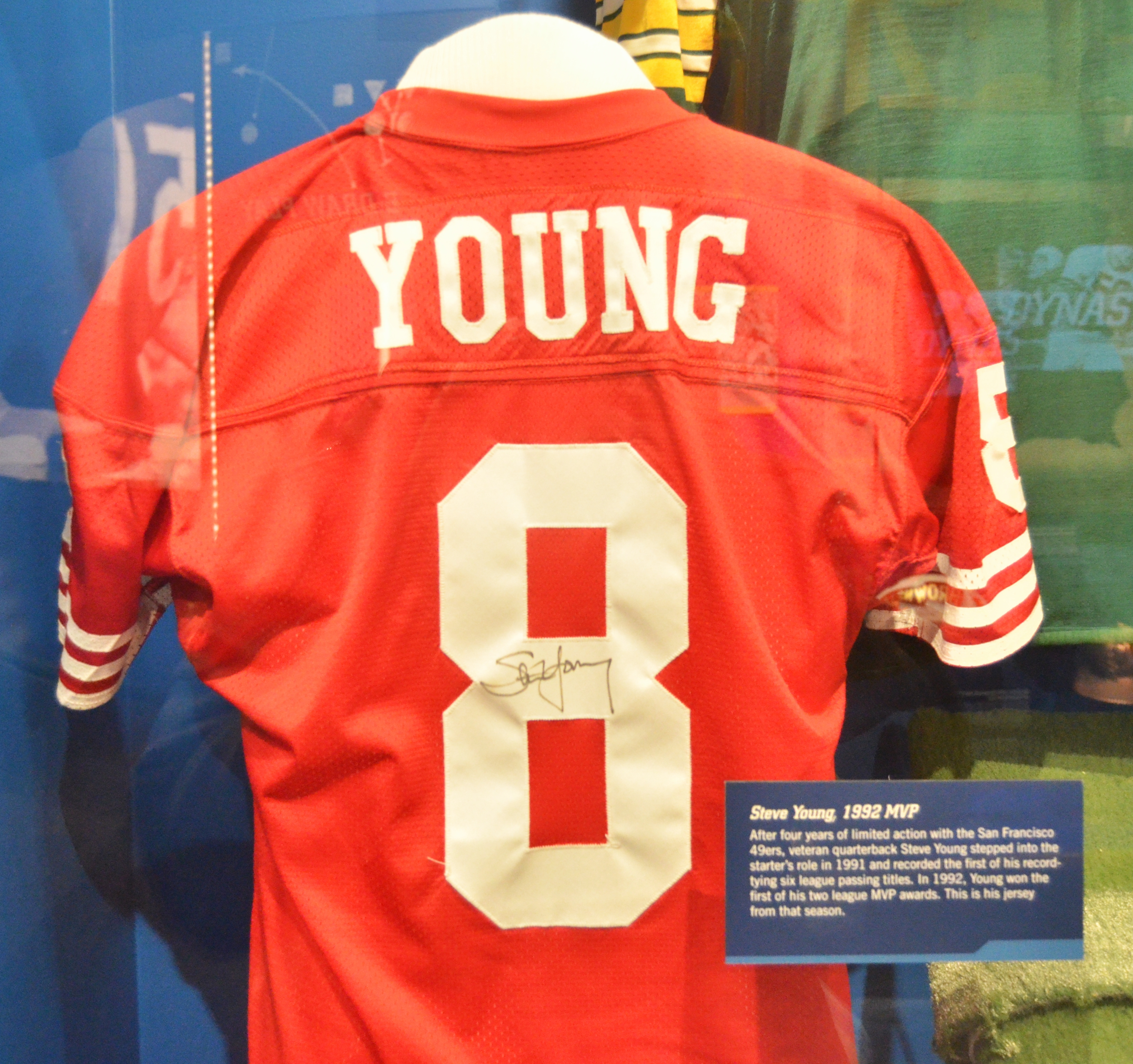
Young's 1992 MVP season jersey shown at the Pro Football Hall of Fame in Canton, Ohio

By the start of the 1992 season, it appeared that Young's starting job was in serious peril. In addition to having to compete with Bono, Montana appeared to be close to recovering from his elbow tendon surgery. San Francisco came close to trading Young to the Los Angeles Raiders, but no deal was finalized and it turned out that Montana would not recover in time to start in the opening game. Montana would not return until the final game of the 1992 season, a Monday Night home game against the Detroit Lions. Montana played the entire second half of that final game and guided the 49ers to victory.

Young ended up as San Francisco's starting quarterback, but once again got off to a rough start. On the fifth play of the opening game at the New York Giants, he suffered a concussion and was replaced by Bono, who threw two touchdown passes while leading the 49ers to a 31–14 victory. The following week, the 49ers lost 34–31 to the Buffalo Bills, despite a career-high 449 passing yards and three touchdowns from Young, in a game that for the first time in NFL history had zero punts from either team.

Young recovered and led the 49ers on a five-game winning streak, capped off by a 56–17 victory over the Atlanta Falcons in which he passed for 399 yards and three touchdowns. After missing most of the next game (a 24–14 loss to the Cardinals) with the flu, Young led San Francisco to a victory in all of their remaining games of the season, giving the team a 14–2 record. He went on to throw for 227 yards and two touchdowns and rushed for 73 yards in a 20–13 divisional playoff win over the Washington Redskins. However, the 49ers lost the NFC Championship game, 30–20, to the eventual Super Bowl champion Dallas Cowboys. Young threw for 313 yards, completing 71.4% of his passes while passing for a touchdown and rushing for another. However, he also threw two interceptions, but the final one came with the outcome of the game already decided.

Young finished the season with 3,465 passing yards and 537 rushing yards, along with an NFL-best 25 touchdown passes and 107.0 passer rating, earning him the NFL Most Valuable Player Award and his first selection to the Pro Bowl. Young was the first quarterback ever to record a triple-digit rating in consecutive seasons. Many credit his turnaround to the mentoring of the 49ers' new offensive coordinator Mike Shanahan, who worked with Young on combining his running skill with on-the-move passing decisions.

==== 1993 season ====
Before the start of the 1993 season, team owner Eddie DeBartolo Jr. announced that he wanted Montana to resume his role as starting quarterback for the 49ers. However, a rift in the locker room had developed, with players split on whom they wanted at quarterback. In the spring of 1993, at Montana's request, San Francisco traded Montana to the Kansas City Chiefs. Young was now the 49ers' undisputed starter, and would remain so for the rest of his career. But once again, Young had a rough start to the season. Over the first four games of 1993, Young, who was hindered by a swollen thumb on his throwing hand, threw eight interceptions, more than he had thrown during the entire 1992 season. But after his thumb healed, Young went on an incredible streak over a span of seven games, throwing 16 touchdown passes with only two interceptions and a 122.2 passer rating. By the end of the year, Young set franchise records for most passing yards (4,023), and consecutive passes thrown without an interception (189, later eclipsed by Alex Smith in 2012), while leading the NFL in touchdown passes (29) and passer rating (101.5). The team slipped to a 10–6 record, but advanced to the NFC championship game again by blowing out the New York Giants 44–3 in the Divisional Round. However, they were again defeated by the Dallas Cowboys, this time 38–21.

==== 1994 season: Second MVP and Super Bowl win ====
After several key free agent signings (including All-Pro cornerback Deion Sanders) and NFL draft selections, the 49ers looked to win their first Super Bowl since 1989. They started fast, beating the Los Angeles Raiders 44–14 on the strength of four touchdown passes from Young, one of four games during the regular season in which he had at least four. After a loss in a much-anticipated game to Joe Montana and the Kansas City Chiefs, the 49ers won their next two games before losing to the Philadelphia Eagles 40–8 at Candlestick Park, a game in which Young was eventually benched in the middle of an offensive series. Although head coach George Seifert later said he only pulled Young because he was getting manhandled by the Eagles' defense, Young had had enough of being scapegoated for 49er shortfalls and loudly (and visibly) lambasted Seifert over his decision while standing on the sideline during the game.

"Is this great or what? I mean, I haven't thrown six touchdown passes in a game in my life. Then I throw six in the Super Bowl! Unbelievable."

— Steve Young

But the game was considered a turning point in the season; from there, Young led the team to 10 consecutive wins, by an average of 20 points, before losing the meaningless finale against the Vikings in which Young completed his first 12 of 13 attempts before going to the sidelines. They finished an NFL best 13–3, securing home-field advantage throughout the NFC playoffs. The 49ers had the number-one offense in the NFL, and were so dominant that Seifert often took Young out of games early if he felt that the 49ers had an insurmountable lead at the time.

After an easy 44–15 victory over the Chicago Bears in the Divisional Round, the 49ers jumped out to a 31–14 halftime lead over the Dallas Cowboys in the NFC Championship Game, holding on to win 38–28. Young threw for two touchdowns, while adding 47 yards and another touchdown on the ground. As a result, he went to his first Super Bowl as a starting quarterback. The 49ers were heavy favorites to become the first team with five Super Bowl victories.

On the strength of a six-touchdown performance that surpassed the previous Super Bowl record of five, owned by the man Young replaced, Joe Montana, Young was named the MVP of Super Bowl XXIX, as the 49ers defeated the San Diego Chargers, 49–26. Young also threw for 325 yards and rushed for 49 yards, making him the first player ever to finish a Super Bowl as the game's leader in both rushing and passing yards.

The victory capped off an incredible year for Young, who had one of the best seasons by a quarterback in NFL history. He threw for 3,969 yards, a then-franchise record 35 touchdown passes with only 10 interceptions, completed 70.3 percent of his passes – the highest completion percentage of the 1990s, third all-time, and at the time, the best completion percentage by any quarterback with more than 400 attempts (later eclipsed by Drew Brees in 2009). Additionally, Young broke Joe Montana's single-season mark with a then-record 112.8 passer rating, and also once again demonstrated his great scrambling ability, accumulating another 289 yards and seven touchdowns on the ground. For his record-breaking season performances, Young won his second AP NFL MVP award, becoming the seventh player in NFL history to win both league and Super Bowl MVP honors in the same season.

==== Later years and injuries ====
In the three years following Super Bowl XXIX, the 49ers were eliminated in the playoffs each year by Brett Favre and the Green Bay Packers, twice in San Francisco. In addition to the early playoff exits, Young suffered a series of injuries that forced him to miss several games from 1995 to 1997. Young entered the 1998 season at age 37 and some began to wonder if his skills would diminish because of his history of injuries and a general decline in his game due to age. However, Young silenced all critics once again, putting up career numbers in passing yards (4,170) and passing touchdowns (36). The 49ers finally beat Favre and the Packers in the NFC Wild Card Round that year, as Young threw the winning touchdown to wide receiver Terrell Owens with three seconds remaining to win the game 30–27. In reference to Dwight Clark's legendary catch against the Dallas Cowboys in the 1981 NFC Championship Game, Owens' grab was called "The Catch II". A week later, however, Garrison Hearst broke his ankle on the 49ers' first play from scrimmage. Without the threat of a running game, Young threw three interceptions (the last one a Hail Mary pass with under 30 seconds remaining in the game) and the 49ers were defeated by the Atlanta Falcons 20–18. Over that span of seasons from 1995 to 1998, Young led the NFL in passer rating twice (in 1996 and 1997), and led the NFL with 36 touchdown passes in 1998.

==== Final game and Injury ====
On September 27, 1999, Young played on Monday Night Football at Sun Devil Stadium against the Arizona Cardinals, but left with just seconds remaining before halftime, cornerback Aeneas Williams rushed in on a corner blitz from Young's blindside. Running back Lawrence Phillips was supposed to block on the play and protect Young's blindside from any incoming pass rushers, but failed to pick up the blitz. Young tried to dodge the oncoming pressure, but Williams delivered a hard, but clean blow, directly to his chest. Fellow cornerback J. J. McCleskey simultaneously dove into the back of his lower legs as he came off a block by tackle Dave Fiore.

The combination of both hits with the blow to the chest sent Young falling backwards into the ground with the back of his head hitting Fiore's leg before it finally made impact with the turf. Young was knocked unconscious and lay motionless on the field with his eyes shut for several seconds as tackle Derrick Deese tugged at his jersey to try to revive him and help him up. Deese immediately waved his arms to call for assistance with team trainers and doctors quickly responding and running on the field with head coach Steve Mariucci and were able to quickly revive Young. After a few moments, Young walked off the field under his own power and remained on the sideline after returning from halftime and for the rest of the 49ers' 24–10 victory at the Cardinals. Young even tried to talk Mariucci into letting him re-enter the game at one point, but Mariucci refused and ruled him out for the game. Young donned a cap on the sidelines as Jeff Garcia stepped in his place. While Phillips put the game away with a 68-yard touchdown, the missed block led the 49ers to question his work ethic. It proved to be the beginning of the end of Phillips' tenure in San Francisco; he was suspended in November for refusing to practice and never played for them again.

"I was shocked, that was my sense of it. I was just shocked. I remember a flash and as I was going backwards, catching (tackle) Dave Fiore's knee and then the ground. And then mostly just resting for a second because I wanted to collect myself, but once I stood up, I felt I knew exactly what was going on and that's why my initial reaction was to go back into the game."
(Reaction to the hit)

— Steve Young
(September 29, 1999)

In the following days, Young underwent MRIs and met with Dr. Gary Steinberg, the chief neurologist at Stanford Hospital, who treated Young's last concussion. Initially, he was expected to miss one to two weeks and still participated in practice. This was the fourth severe concussion Young had suffered with the other three concussions occurring in between October 1996 and August 1997. He considered retirement following his last series of concussions and was urged to do so by his family.

"The MRI did not show any of the so-called white spots, which are thought to be indicative of progressive brain trauma. So that was clear, but the doctor did recommend he sit out at least a week and possibly two. Steve is not in denial in terms of this concussion issue. He will follow the medical advice. He obviously has tremendous opportunities for life after football and he's not going to endanger that, but he happens to love the game and he wants to play. Right now, his focus is on still making this a winning season. Frankly, he wanted to play this week, but I guarantee you he won't."

— Leigh Steinberg
(Steve Young's Agent)

It was reportedly his second concussion in a season that was only three weeks old, and at least the seventh of his career. Following the season, the 49ers concluded that Young would never be medically cleared to play again, and told him that he would be released if he did not retire. Although Young was offered a job as the starting quarterback of the Denver Broncos (where his former offensive coordinator, Mike Shanahan, was the head coach), he retired because of his repeated concussions. In a 2013 Frontline interview, Young said that, partially based upon their own experiences, he and many retired players are increasingly concerned about repeated concussions and subconcussive hits. Young is particularly concerned about certain positions that take frequent hits, such as running backs and linemen.

== Career statistics and records ==
Legend
	AP NFL MVP
	AP NFL MVP & OPOTY
	Won the Super Bowl
	Led the league
**Bold**	Career high

=== USFL ===
==== Regular season ====
Year	Team	Games			Passing								Rushing			
Year	Team	GP	GS	Record	Cmp	Att	Pct	Yds	Avg	TD	Int	Rtg	Att	Yds	Avg	TD
1984	L.A. Express	12	12	**8–4**	**179**	**310**	**57.7**	**2,361**	**7.6**	**10**	9	**80.6**	**79**	**515**	6.5	**7**
1985	L.A. Express	13	13	2–11	137	250	54.8	1,741	7.0	6	**13**	63.1	56	368	**6.6**	2
Career		25	25	10–15	316	560	56.4	4,102	7.3	16	22	72.8	135	883	6.5	9

==== Postseason ====
Year	Team	Games			Passing								Rushing			
Year	Team	GP	GS	Record	Cmp	Att	Pct	Yds	Avg	TD	Int	Rtg	Att	Yds	Avg	TD
1984	L.A. Express	2	2	1–1	30	67	44.8	421	6.3	1	4	46.0	9	68	7.6	0
Career		2	2	1–1	30	67	44.8	421	6.3	1	4	46.0	9	68	7.6	0

=== NFL ===
==== Regular season ====
Year	Team	Games			Passing								Rushing				Sacks		Fumbles	
Year	Team	GP	GS	Record	Cmp	Att	Pct	Yds	Avg	TD	Int	Rtg	Att	Yds	Avg	TD	Sck	SckY	Fum	Lost
1985	TB	5	5	1–4	72	138	52.2	935	6.8	3	8	56.9	40	233	5.8	1	21	158	4	1
1986	TB	14	14	2–12	195	363	53.7	2,282	6.3	8	13	65.5	74	425	5.7	5	47	**326**	**11**	4
1987	SF	8	3	2–1	37	69	53.6	570	8.3	10	0	120.8	26	190	7.3	1	3	25	0	0
1988	SF	11	3	2–1	54	101	53.5	680	6.7	3	3	72.2	27	184	6.8	1	13	75	5	2
1989	SF	10	3	3–0	64	92	69.6	1,001	10.9	8	3	120.8	38	126	3.3	2	12	84	2	0
1990	SF	6	1	0–1	38	62	61.3	427	6.9	2	0	92.6	15	159	**10.6**	0	8	41	1	0
1991	SF	11	10	5–5	180	279	64.5	2,517	**9.0**	17	8	101.8	66	415	6.3	4	13	79	3	1
1992	SF	16	16	**14–2**	268	402	66.7	3,465	8.6	25	7	107.0	**76**	**537**	7.1	4	29	152	9	3
1993	SF	16	16	10–6	314	462	68.0	4,023	8.7	29	**16**	101.5	69	407	5.9	2	31	160	8	5
1994	SF	16	16	13–3	**324**	461	**70.3**	3,969	8.6	35	10	**112.8**	58	293	5.1	**7**	31	163	4	3
1995	SF	11	11	8–3	299	447	66.9	3,200	7.2	20	11	92.3	50	250	5.0	3	25	115	3	3
1996	SF	12	12	9–3	214	316	67.7	2,410	7.6	14	6	97.2	52	310	6.0	4	34	160	3	2
1997	SF	15	15	12–3	241	356	67.7	3,029	8.5	19	6	104.7	50	199	4.0	3	35	220	4	0
1998	SF	15	15	11–4	322	**517**	62.3	**4,170**	8.1	**36**	12	101.1	70	454	6.5	6	**48**	234	9	**6**
1999	SF	3	3	2–1	45	84	53.6	446	5.3	3	4	60.9	11	57	5.2	0	8	63	2	1
Career		169	143	94–49	2,667	4,149	64.3	33,124	8.0	232	107	96.8	722	4,239	5.9	43	358	2,055	68	31

==== Postseason ====
Year	Team	Games			Passing								Rushing				Sacks		Fumbles	
Year	Team	GP	GS	Record	Cmp	Att	Pct	Yds	Avg	TD	Int	Rtg	Att	Yds	Avg	TD	Sck	SckY	Fum	Lost
1987	SF	1	0	—	12	17	70.6	158	9.3	1	1	94.7	6	72	**12.0**	1	0	0	0	0
1988	SF	2	0	—	1	1	100.0	-1	-1.0	0	0	79.2	3	1	0.3	0	0	0	0	0
1989	SF	3	0	—	3	5	60.0	26	5.2	0	0	73.7	5	5	1.0	0	0	0	0	0
1990	SF	2	0	—	1	1	**100.0**	25	**25.0**	0	0	**118.7**	0	0	0.0	0	0	0	0	0
1992	SF	2	2	1–1	45	65	69.2	540	8.3	3	3	90.5	16	106	6.6	1	**5**	25	**3**	**3**
1993	SF	2	2	1–1	44	67	65.7	513	7.7	1	1	87.5	10	55	5.5	1	**5**	18	1	0
1994	SF	3	3	**3–0**	**53**	**87**	60.9	**623**	7.2	**9**	0	117.2	**20**	**128**	6.4	**2**	4	20	0	0
1995	SF	1	1	0–1	32	65	49.2	328	5.0	0	2	51.3	9	77	8.6	1	3	20	1	1
1996	SF	2	2	1–1	16	26	61.5	169	6.5	1	0	93.3	12	68	5.7	1	1	0	0	0
1997	SF	2	2	1–1	44	68	64.7	474	7.0	1	1	83.8	6	38	6.3	0	**5**	**31**	**3**	1
1998	SF	2	2	1–1	41	69	59.4	471	6.8	4	**5**	69.2	9	44	4.9	1	3	14	1	0
Career		22	14	8–6	292	471	62.0	3,326	7.1	20	13	85.8	96	594	6.2	8	26	128	9	5

==== Super Bowl ====
Year	SB	Team	Opp.	Passing								Rushing				Result
Year	SB	Team	Opp.	Cmp	Att	Pct	Yds	Y/A	TD	Int	Rtg	Att	Yds	Y/A	TD	Result
1989	XXIV	SF	DEN	2	3	**66.7**	20	6.7	0	0	85.4	4	6	1.5	0	**W** 55–10
1994	XXIX	SF	SD	**24**	**36**	**66.7**	**325**	**9.3**	**6**	0	**134.8**	**5**	**49**	**9.8**	0	**W** 49–26
Career				26	39	66.7	345	8.9	6	0	134.1	9	55	6.1	0	W−L 2–0

=== Records and legacy ===
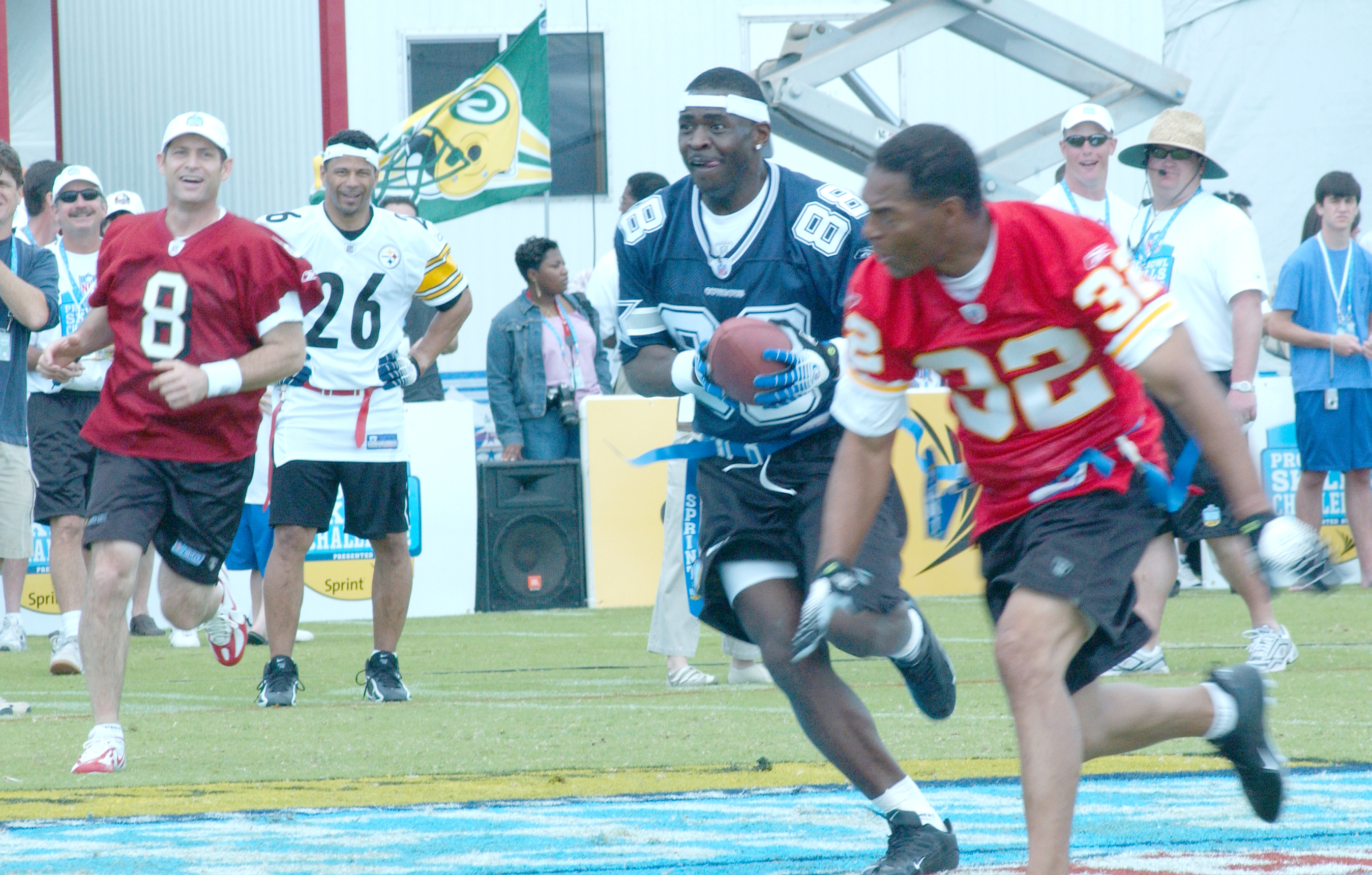
Young (8) and Michael Irvin (88) playing in the ESPN Pro Bowl Skills Challenge in 2006

Although Young did not become the 49ers' first-string quarterback until his seventh NFL season, and he played a full season only thrice (all consecutively) during his 15-year career, Young had a significant impact on the NFL. A two-time league MVP, he completed 2,667 of 4,149 passes for 33,124 yards and 232 touchdowns, with 107 interceptions and 43 rushing touchdowns. Young's 96.8 career passer rating is the twelfth highest in NFL history and fifth highest among retired players, behind Russell Wilson, Tony Romo, Tom Brady, and Drew Brees. Young's 4,239 rushing yards are the seventh most ever gained by a quarterback, behind Lamar Jackson, Michael Vick, Cam Newton, Russell Wilson, Randall Cunningham, and Josh Allen. At the time of his retirement, Young had the highest career passer rating ever, and only trailed Cunningham in rushing yards for a quarterback. He was the NFL's top rated passer in six different seasons and led the league in touchdown passes four times. In 20 postseason games, Young threw 20 touchdown passes with only 13 interceptions, and scored eight touchdowns on the ground. During his stint with the 49ers, Young passed for 29,907 yards, 221 touchdowns, and 86 interceptions, with a passer rating of 101.4, highest in franchise history. He was also sacked 290 times, also most in franchise history. From October 20, 1991, to October 1, 2023, Young held the franchise's highest single game completion rate of 90%, which he set against the Detroit Lions, until it was bested by Brock Purdy's 95.2% against the Arizona Cardinals.

NFL records

- Thirteenth highest passer rating, career, including active players – 96.8
- Fourth highest passer rating, career, retired players only – 96.8
- Eighth highest career completion percentage, retired players – 64.3%
- Most times led the league in passer rating, career – 6 (tied with Sammy Baugh)
- Most consecutive times led the league in passer rating – 4 (1991–94)
- One of seven quarterbacks to lead the league in touchdown passes 4 times (tied w/ Johnny Unitas, Brett Favre, Peyton Manning, Tom Brady, Drew Brees, and Len Dawson)
- Most touchdown passes, playoff game – 6 (tied w/ Daryle Lamonica & Tom Brady)
- Most touchdown passes in one Super Bowl – 6

49ers records

- Most average yards per attempt (20+ Atts) (Game): vs Detroit (12/19/93), 15.39
- Most touchdown passes (season): 36 (1998)
- Best completion percentage (season): 70.3 (1994)
- Best passer rating (season): 112.8 (1994)
- Most 300-yard passing games (season): 7 (1998)
- Best passer rating (career): 101.4
- Most consecutive games with a touchdown pass: 18, at Det. (10/9/94) to vs. StL (11/26/95) note: (DNP in 5 games in 1995)
- Most rushing touchdowns by a quarterback (career): 43

In 1999, Young was ranked No. 63 on The Sporting News list of the 100 Greatest Football Players. Young was elected to the Pro Football Hall of Fame on February 5, 2005; he was the first left-handed quarterback to be so honored. Young was enshrined August 7, 2005, and his induction speech was given by his father, LeGrande "Grit" Young.

The San Francisco 49ers had his No. 8 jersey retired during a halftime ceremony against the New England Patriots on October 5, 2008. Young was the 11th player in team history to receive this honor. He is also the only 49er in team history to wear No. 8.

== Awards and honors ==
=== NFL ===
- 3× Super Bowl champion (XXIII, XXIV, XXIX)
- Super Bowl MVP (XXIX)
- 2× NFL Most Valuable Player (1992, 1994)
- NFL Offensive Player of the Year (1992)
- 2× UPI NFC Offensive Player of the Year (1992, 1994)
- 3× First-team All-Pro (1992–1994)
- 3× Second-team All-Pro (1995, 1997, 1998)
- 7× Pro Bowl (1992–1998)
- 4× NFL passing touchdowns leader (1992–1994, 1998)
- 6× NFL passer rating leader (1991–1994, 1996, 1997)
- 5× NFL completion percentage leader (1992, 1994–1997)
- 2× Bert Bell Award (1992, 1994)
- No. 81 on The Top 100: NFL's Greatest Players
- San Francisco 49ers Hall of Fame
- San Francisco 49ers No. 8 retired

=== College ===
- College Football Hall of Fame inductee (2001)
- Unanimous All-American (1983)
- 2× First-team All-WAC (1982, 1983)
- 2× WAC Offensive Player of the Year (1982, 1983)
- Davey O'Brien Award (1983)
- Sammy Baugh Trophy (1982)
- BYU Cougars Jersey No. 8 retired

== Post-football ==
=== Business career ===
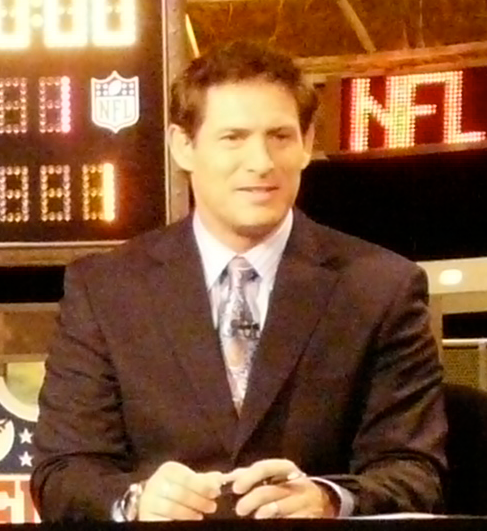
Young at ESPN's broadcast set for the 2009 NFL draft

In 1994, Young earned a Juris Doctor (J.D.) from BYU's J. Reuben Clark Law School.

In 2000, Young gave the opening prayer at the Republican National Convention.

In 2007, Young co-founded Huntsman Gay Global Capital (HGGC) with billionaire industrialist Jon M. Huntsman and former Bain Capital executive Robert C. Gay. After being involved in business ventures with the private equity firm, Young continued to serve as a managing director.

In 2011, Young was one of several notable BYU athletes and coaches who appeared in the school's "Real Cougar" advertising campaign, which featured the individuals telling an actual cougar about being a "real cougar". In one of the ads, Young poked fun at himself:

Young: I love BYU so much I even got my law degree here.
Cougar: (growls)
Young: Lawyers... I know.

As of 2022, Young has been serving as chairman of the board for Integrity Marketing Group and his private equity firm, Huntsman Gay Global Capital, held a position in the partnership.

=== Acting career ===
Young has both performed dramatic roles and appeared as himself in a limited acting career. He appeared in one episode of Frasier and one episode of Lois & Clark: The New Adventures of Superman (cast as Lois' former high school football quarterback boyfriend, Joe Maloy). He also made a guest appearance as himself in the Dharma & Greg episode "Are You Ready for Some Football?" encouraging Dharma, the team's Number One Fan. In 1995, Young appeared as himself in the Season 6, Episode 12 episode of Beverly Hills, 90210. He also made cameo appearances in the LDS comedy The Singles Ward (2002) and in a season 5 episode of BYUtv's Studio C (2014). Young also made a guest appearance as himself in season 8 of the NBC comedy series Wings in the episode "Just Call Me Angel".

Young was supposed to receive a part in the 1998 movie There's Something About Mary - a role specifically written for him - but he turned it down. Instead it went to Brett Favre.

=== Broadcasting career ===
Young was laid off by ESPN on June 30, 2023, after being a fixture on ESPN's NFL studio shows, including NFL Countdown, for more than two decades. He was part of a round of layoffs that included many notable on-air personalities.

== Philanthropy ==
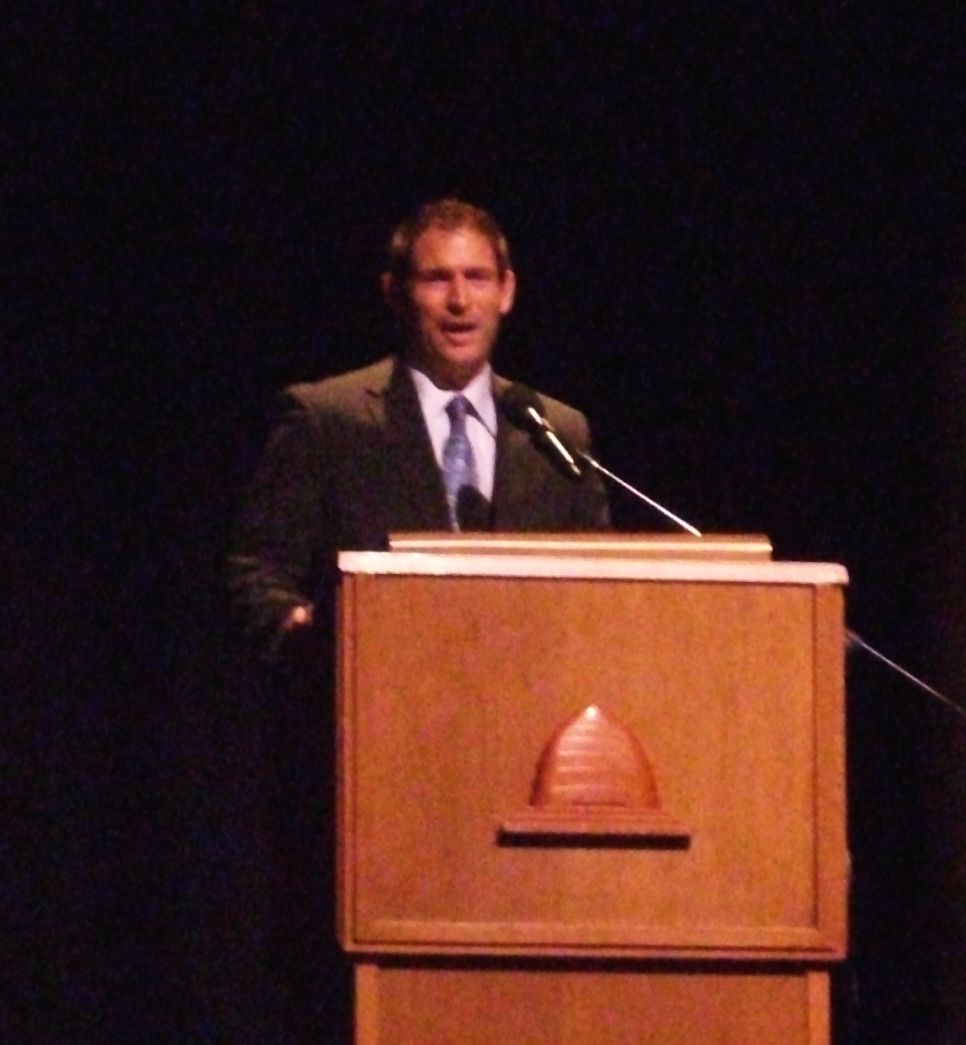
Young speaking to Young Single Adults in 2009

Young serves as a National Advisor to ASCEND: A Humanitarian Alliance. This non-profit organization plans expeditions to African and South American countries to provide life skills mentoring with sustainable solutions in education, enterprise, health and simple technology.

In 1993, Young founded a charitable foundation known as the Forever Young Foundation, which serves children facing significant physical, emotional, and financial challenges by providing academic, athletic, and therapeutic opportunities otherwise unavailable to them.

Young also serves as the national spokesman for an organization founded by former Save Darfur Coalition executive director and founder, David Rubenstein. Young began his affiliation with the organization in 2009, when he became the honorary league commissioner for their charitable dodgeball tournaments held on college campuses nationwide.

== Personal life ==
Young is a member of the Church of Jesus Christ of Latter-day Saints (LDS Church). He is a great-great-great-grandson of Brigham Young, second president of the LDS Church, for whom BYU is named.

While at BYU, Young was a passenger in a car crash in which the driver, a family friend named Jill Simmons, died. It is unclear if the driver had fallen asleep, or if she had died of an aneurysm, in advance of the crash.

Young married his wife, Barbara Graham, in 2000. They have two sons and two daughters. According to A Football Life, because his playing career ended before his eldest child was born, Young wrote his autobiography, QB: My Life Behind the Spiral, initially as a private memoir for his children. The book was published in 2016, with writer Jeff Benedict as coauthor.

Young resides in the San Francisco Bay Area.

== See also ==
- Bay Area Sports Hall of Fame
- List of NCAA major college football yearly passing leaders
- List of NCAA major college football yearly total offense leaders
- List of NFL quarterbacks who have posted a perfect passer rating
