= ASCEND: A Humanitarian Alliance =

US-based non-profit organization

Ascend: A Humanitarian Alliance is a registered 501(c)(3) nonprofit organization which focuses on international economic and health care development in Africa and South America. Headquarters are located in Salt Lake City, Utah, United States, with full-time offices in Ethiopia, Peru, Bolivia and Ecuador and affiliates in DR Congo, Cape Verde, Ghana, Mozambique, and Sudan. Ascend Alliance operates under the governance of a volunteer board of directors which is composed of business professionals, humanitarians and community leaders. A local group of donors, partners, volunteers, interns, and staff members contribute their time, resources and skills to further the organization's goals. Its leadership is affiliated with the Church of Jesus Christ of Latter-day Saints.

== History ==
Ascend was organized in 1982 as the Andean Children’s Foundation by Timothy S. Evans. The foundation was later reorganized as Chasqui Humanitarian, led by Joel Madsen. In 2005, the Engage Now Foundation, organized by Tim Evans and Carolyn Dailey, with origins in 1984, merged with Chasqui and became known as Ascend, A Humanitarian Alliance.

== Programs ==
Ascend works on sustainable development programs in education, enterprise, health, and simple technology.

=== Education ===
Ascend’s education programs include life-skills training, literacy, teacher training, scholarships, and distribution of library books and school supplies.

Education initiatives include teacher training, library books, school supplies, and educational scholarships.

=== Enterprise ===
Ascend provides business training and on-site mentoring to create self-employment opportunities and make family businesses more profitable.

Ascend offers training, including on-site mentoring for existing small businesses and hands-on training for first-time entrepreneurs. Businesses assisted by Ascend include animal husbandry, granaries and agricultural facilities, bee-keeping and honey production, stores, restaurants, brick-making, welding, shoe manufacturing, handicrafts, and sewing. Ascend works to facilitate loans for small business, including micro-credit and micro-franchising opportunities.

=== Health ===
Ascend’s community health programs provide medical education, treatment and preventative measures.

Ascend health efforts focus in three areas: training of community workers and mother's groups in preventive measures and simple remedies, treatment of medical and surgical problems, and Sustainable Orphan Advocacy and Rescue (SOAR), which combines AIDS prevention training and identifies and prioritizes care of orphans.

=== Simple technology ===
Ascend assists in building greenhouses, irrigation systems, latrines, food storage facilities, wells, pumps, cisterns, spring and rainwater catchments, pipelines, water filters, adobe stoves as well as water capture and treatment and solar energy systems.

== Operations ==
Ascend has full and part-time staff at their headquarters and abroad. They provide opportunities for individuals, professionals and families to donate their time, money and expertise at Ascend’s headquarters or abroad by volunteering through expeditions and internships.

=== Expeditions ===
Ascend takes expedition groups to Africa and South America. Countries that have benefited from these service missions are: Ecuador, Peru, Bolivia, Ethiopia and Mozambique. Groups are in the country for one to two weeks participating in service opportunities and cultural tours.

=== Internships ===
Interns volunteer at headquarters or abroad in their area of expertise.

== See also ==
- Microenterprise Education Initiative

Notable people involved with the project

- Kurt Bestor
- Don R. Clarke
- LaVell Edwards
- Dale Murphy
- Steve Young
