= Jake Murphy =

American football player (born 1989)

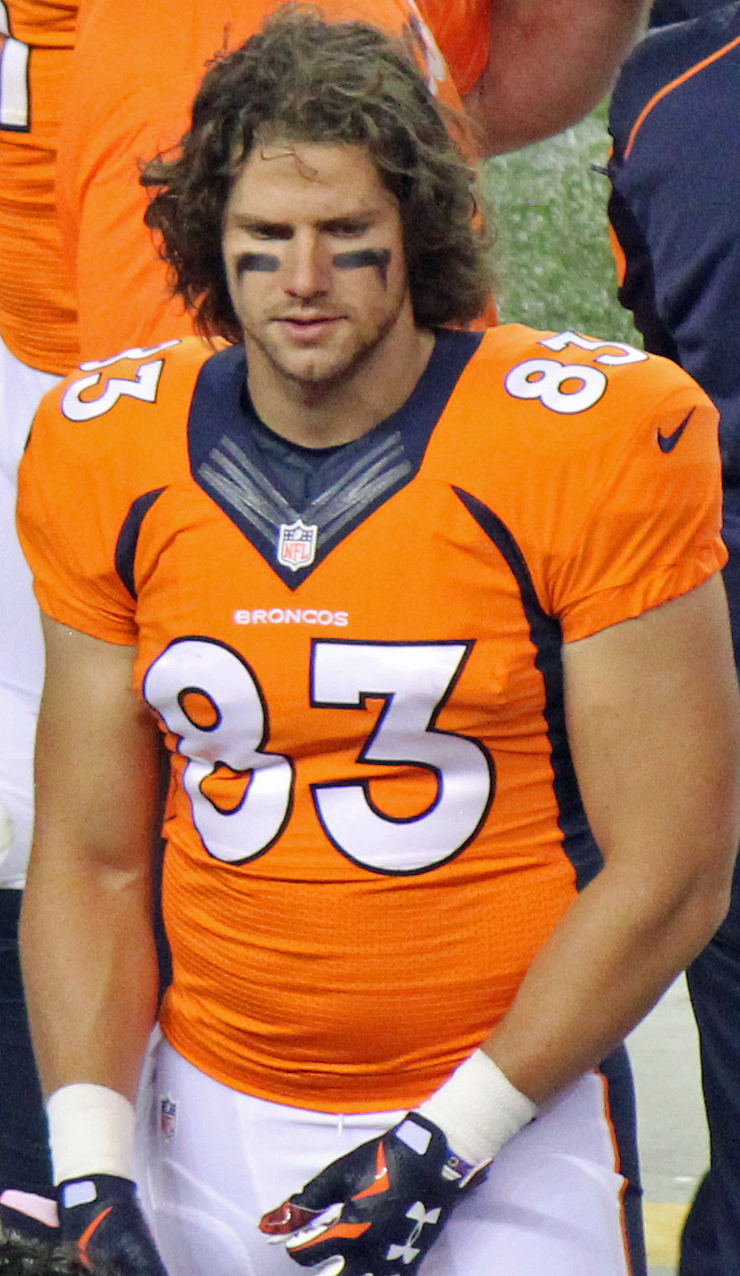
- Murphy in the 2015 NFL preseason.

No. 83
- Position: Tight end

Personal information
- Born: September 21, 1989 (age 37); Atlanta, Georgia, U.S.
- Listed height: 6 ft 4 in (1.93 m)
- Listed weight: 250 lb (113 kg)

Career information
- High school: American Fork (UT)
- College: Utah
- NFL draft: 2014: undrafted

Career history
- Oakland Raiders (2014)*; Miami Dolphins (2014)*; Cincinnati Bengals (2014–2015)*; Denver Broncos (2015)*
- * Offseason or practice squad member only
- Stats at Pro Football Reference

Jacob Thomas Murphy (born September 21, 1989) is an American former football tight end. He was signed by the Oakland Raiders as an undrafted free agent in 2014. He played college football at the University of Utah.

== Professional career ==
=== Oakland Raiders ===
Murphy decided to forego his senior year at the University of Utah to declare for the 2014 NFL draft. After going unselected in the draft, he signed with the Oakland Raiders on May 10, 2014.

=== Miami Dolphins ===
On September 23, 2014, Murphy was signed to the Miami Dolphins' practice squad.

=== Cincinnati Bengals ===
Murphy was signed to the practice squad of the Cincinnati Bengals on November 3, 2014.

He was waived on August 19, 2015.

=== Denver Broncos ===
The Denver Broncos claimed Murphy off waivers on August 20, 2015. On August 31, 2015, he was released by the Broncos.

== Personal ==
Murphy is the son of Dale Murphy, a former Major League Baseball outfielder (1976–93).
