= Dale Murphy =

American baseball player (born 1956)

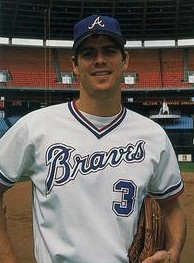
- Murphy with the Atlanta Braves in 1984
- Outfielder
- Born: March 12, 1956 (age 70); Portland, Oregon, U.S.
- Batted: Right Threw: Right

MLB debut
- September 13, 1976, for the Atlanta Braves

Last MLB appearance
- May 21, 1993, for the Colorado Rockies

MLB statistics
- Batting average: .265
- Hits: 2,111
- Home runs: 398
- Runs batted in: 1,266
- Stats at Baseball Reference

Teams
- Atlanta Braves (1976–1990); Philadelphia Phillies (1990–1992); Colorado Rockies (1993)

Career highlights and awards
- 7× All-Star (1980, 1982–1987); 2× NL MVP (1982, 1983); 5× Gold Glove Award (1982–1986); 4× Silver Slugger Award (1982–1985); Roberto Clemente Award (1988); 2× NL home run leader (1984, 1985); 2× NL RBI leader (1982, 1983); Atlanta Braves No. 3 retired; Braves Hall of Fame

Dale Bryan Murphy (born March 12, 1956) is an American former outfielder in Major League Baseball (MLB) who played for three National League (NL) teams, mainly the Atlanta Braves, from 1976 to 1993. A seven-time All-Star, he led the NL in home runs, runs batted in and slugging percentage twice each. Playing on frequently poor teams that posted only three winning seasons in his 15 years with Atlanta, he was named the NL's Most Valuable Player (MVP) in 1982 after leading the Braves to their first division title in 13 years, topping the league with 109 RBI. He was again named the MVP in 1983 after improving his batting figures in nearly every category, batting .302 with a career-high 121 RBI, and becoming only the sixth player in history with 30 home runs and 30 stolen bases in a season.

A model of reliability in the Braves lineup, he played in 740 consecutive games from 1981 to 1986, then the sixth-longest streak in NL history. His 308 home runs in the 1980s were the second most by any major league player, behind only Mike Schmidt, and his 929 RBI in the decade tied him with Schmidt for the most in the NL, despite the Braves posting the league's worst record in that time. Highly regarded for his throwing arm, Murphy won five consecutive Gold Glove Awards as a center fielder, and his 99 assists and 21 double plays in the 1980s topped all NL outfielders.

Murphy's 398 career home runs ranked sixth in NL history among right-handed hitters when he retired, and his 202 home runs as a center fielder ranked ninth in major league history; his .469 slugging percentage was the fifth highest among NL players with 1,000 games in center field. His 371 home runs with the Braves remain the Atlanta record for a right-handed hitter, and he also set Atlanta records for career games (1,926), at bats (7,098), hits (1,901), RBI (1,143), runs (1,103), doubles (306), walks (912) and total bases (3,394), all of which were later broken by Chipper Jones. In 1994, he became the fifth player to have his uniform number retired by the Braves. Murphy was inducted into the World Sports Humanitarian Hall of Fame in 1995, and the Oregon Sports Hall of Fame and Georgia Sports Hall of Fame in 1997.

== Early life ==
Dale Murphy was born in Portland, Oregon, on March 12, 1956, to parents Charles and Betty. He had a sister, Sue. Murphy attended Woodrow Wilson High School and played American Legion Baseball, becoming a star catcher who batted .465 in his senior year. After being selected by the Braves with the fifth pick in the 1974 amateur draft, Murphy opted to sign with the team instead of accepting a scholarship offer from Arizona State University. He was assigned to the Rookie League Kingsport Braves in the Appalachian League, and batted .254 in 54 games. In 1975 he was moved up to the class-A Greenwood Braves in the Western Carolinas League. Although he batted only .228, he was moved up in 1976 to the double-A Savannah Braves in the Southern League, where he batted .267 before advancing midseason to the triple-A Richmond Braves in the International League, hitting .260 over the rest of the year.

== Major leagues ==
=== Atlanta Braves ===
Murphy began his major league career in 1976 with a nineteen-game stint catching as a September call-up with the Atlanta Braves. He made his debut in the second game of a road doubleheader against the Los Angeles Dodgers on September 13 with a pair of RBI singles in a 4–3 loss. After returning to Richmond for most of 1977, he appeared in only eighteen games for Atlanta that September, hitting his first two home runs in a 10-inning, 8–7 road win over the San Diego Padres on September 15. In 1978, the Braves shifted Murphy into becoming a first baseman; at the plate he had only a .226 batting average with a league-leading 145 strikeouts, but he also showed hints of his future power by hitting 23 home runs and led the team with 79 RBI. On July 2, he drove in a career-high six runs with a grand slam and a 2-run single in a 9–7 win over the San Francisco Giants, and on May 18, 1979, Murphy had the only 3-home run game of his career in a 6–4 win over the Giants. But within days, with his batting average at .348, he was sidelined due to cartilage damage in his left knee that required arthroscopic surgery, and he appeared briefly in only one more game in the next eight weeks. After returning, he had a career-high five hits including a pair of home runs and a triple on September 14 in a 10–7 road win over the Padres.

Murphy switched to the outfield in 1980, a move that would help initiate a decade of highly productive play in the National League. Beginning the season briefly in left field and then in right field, in mid-May he was switched to center field, the position at which he would find his greatest success. He was named to his first All-Star team, hitting .300 at the midseason break. He ended the year leading the team in total bases and tied with Bob Horner for the lead with 89 RBI as the Braves finished 81-80 for their first winning season in six years, and their first season out of last place since 1975. By 1982, the former catcher had transformed himself into an MVP outfielder who appeared in each of Atlanta's 162 games; at the All-Star break, he was batting .285 with 23 home runs and 62 RBI as the Braves found themselves in first place, and he hit .343 in July as the team opened up a 7-game lead, eventually holding off the defending World Series champion Dodgers to win the division by one game as they led the league in scoring for the first time in nine years. His turnaround as a fielder was equally stark. In 1978, Murphy had led all NL first basemen in errors. In 1982, spending time at all three outfield positions, he won the first of five consecutive Gold Gloves, as well as the first MVP award by a Brave since 1957, when Hank Aaron won the award with the then-Milwaukee Braves. Playing in the decade before the Braves began their dominance of the National League East, Murphy also made his only postseason appearance in 1982. The league's most valuable player failed to translate his regular season preeminence into October success, picking up only three singles and scoring one run as the eventual World Series-champion St. Louis Cardinals swept the Braves in three games in the National League Championship Series.

Murphy rebounded from the postseason sweep with another MVP award in 1983, leading the league in RBI and slugging percentage. The Braves built a lead of 6 1/2 games in mid-August, but ultimately lost the division by three games to the Dodgers despite Murphy's best efforts, as he batted .327 in September with 10 home runs and 29 RBI to pick up Player of the Month honors. On September 13, he stole three bases in a 6–0 road loss to the Cincinnati Reds, including back-to-back steals of second and third base. On September 24, he stole his 30th base of the season and scored on a Rafael Ramírez single in the ninth inning for a 3–2 win over the Dodgers, becoming the sixth player in history and the first NL player in ten years to join the 30–30 club. This time period ultimately proved the high-water era of Murphy's career; in 1984 he led the NL in home runs, slugging and total bases, and in 1985 he led the league in home runs, runs scored and walks. On August 18, 1984, he again picked up five hits including three leadoff doubles, scoring four times in an 8–3 road win over the St. Louis Cardinals. Each year during the four-season span from 1982 to 1985 he won a Gold Glove, appeared in the All-Star Game, and placed in the top nine in MVP voting.

In 1987, he enjoyed another strong season, hitting a career-high 44 home runs, including his 300th career home run on August 21 in a 5–4 victory over the Pittsburgh Pirates. He ended the season with a .295 batting average and 105 RBI, though the Braves finished in fifth place, only a slight improvement over their last-place finish a year earlier. In 1988, however, after being voted the previous year to what was to be his final All-Star appearance, Murphy's production began to decline. He saw his batting average free-fall to .226; only once more, in 1991, would Murphy bat above .250. Once a consistent source of power at the plate, he never again hit 25 home runs or more in a season. Still, his totals of 24 home runs and 77 RBI in 1988 and 84 RBI in 1989 led the Braves as the team continued a downward slide. In 1988 the team lost 106 games, posting their worst record since 1935 when the franchise was located in Boston; slight improvements couldn't help the team avoid the league's worst record again in 1989 and 1990. On April 21, 1989, Murphy hit his 336th home run in a 5–3 loss to the Padres, passing Aaron to become Atlanta's career leader (Aaron had previously hit 398 home runs while the Braves were located in Milwaukee). Also in 1989, he twice equalled his career high of 6 RBI in a game, in a 9–4 win over the Padres on April 23, and a 10-1 drubbing of the Giants on July 27 with a pair of three-run home runs to begin and end the carnage as the Braves scored all their runs in the sixth inning.

=== Final years ===
The Braves traded Murphy to the Philadelphia Phillies for Jeff Parrett on August 3, 1990. Murphy's time with the Phillies was mostly uneventful, though one highlight was his 2,000th career hit, a double in a 2–1 win over the Montreal Expos on May 29, 1991. He enjoyed one of his last highlights on August 6 with a walk-off grand slam in the bottom of the 11th inning for a 6–2 win over the Chicago Cubs. Though his average rose as high as .296 on May 3, he ended the campaign batting .252, but his 81 RBI were the second most on the club, and his 33 doubles were the second highest total of his career. A degenerative, arthritic condition in his left knee limited Murphy to only 18 games in the 1992 season with the Phillies, although he did hit two home runs in that time to bring his career total to 398. He was released by the Phillies at the end of 1993 spring training and, on the same day, signed a minor league contract with the Colorado Rockies for their inaugural season. He was used mostly as a pinch hitter, and had an RBI single in the first win in Rockies history, an 11–4 win over the Expos on April 9.

After going 0-for-3 with a strikeout in the Rockies' 8–0 road loss to the Dodgers on May 21, 1993 (a rare start and, even more rare, only the fourth time all season he was in a game from the first pitch to the final out), Murphy did not play in the next 4 games. On the morning of May 27, while the Rockies were in Houston to begin a series with the Astros, he suddenly announced his retirement from baseball at age 37. He explained the Rockies were needing to make a 25-man roster move and informed him ahead of time he was going to be released. The team gave him the chance to retire instead of being released, which he did.

Murphy finished at 398 career home runs, failing to homer for the Rockies in 49 plate appearances and reach the 400-homer milestone. At the time of his retirement, he was 27th on the all-time home run list (12th in National League history) and 4th among active players, two behind Andre Dawson of the Boston Red Sox.

=== Career summary and honors ===
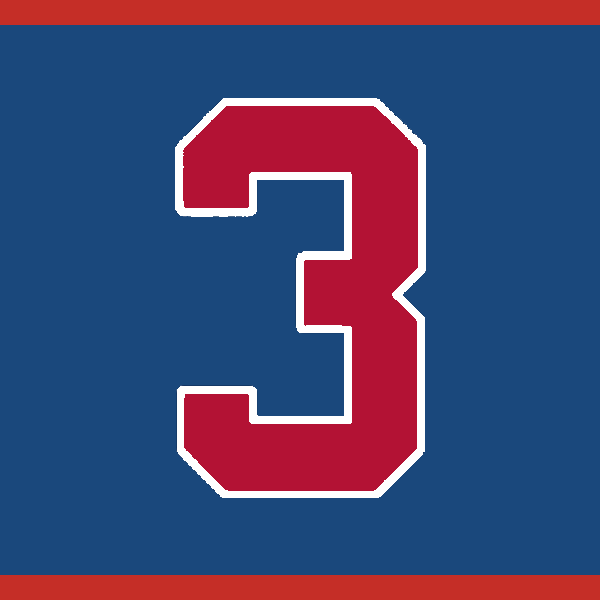
Dale Murphy's number 3 was retired by the Atlanta Braves in 1994.

Murphy finished his career with 398 home runs, 1,266 RBI, and a .265 lifetime batting average. His MVP awards in 1982 and 1983 make him one of only four outfielders in major league history with consecutive MVP years; at the time, he was the youngest to have accomplished the feat. His many honors include seven All-Star appearances, five Gold Gloves, and four Silver Slugger Awards. Murphy led the National League in home runs, RBI and slugging percentage twice each, and in runs, walks and total bases once each; in addition to trailing only Mike Schmidt in home runs in the 1980s, he also led the major leagues in home runs and RBI over the 10-year span from 1981 to 1990.

During the 1980s, Murphy led the NL in games, at bats, runs, hits, extra base hits, RBI, runs created, total bases, and plate appearances. He also accomplished a 30–30 (30 home runs with 30 stolen bases) season in 1983. Murphy played in 740 consecutive games, at the time the 11th longest such streak in baseball history. His jersey number 3 was retired by the Atlanta Braves on June 13, 1994; the number had been earlier worn by Babe Ruth, who wore Boston Braves number 3 during the partial 1935 season with which his career concluded. Murphy was inducted into both the Oregon Sports Hall of Fame and the Georgia Sports Hall of Fame in 1997.

=== Public persona ===
Murphy's clean-living habits off the diamond were frequently noted in the media. Raised as a Presbyterian, he converted to the Church of Jesus Christ of Latter-day Saints (LDS Church) in 1975 while in the minor leagues after conversations with teammate Barry Bonnell. As a devout church member, Murphy did not drink alcoholic beverages, would not allow women to be photographed embracing him, and paid his teammates' dinner checks as long as alcoholic beverages were not on the tab. He also refused to give television interviews unless he was fully dressed.

For several years The Atlanta Constitution ran a weekly column, wherein Murphy responded to young fans' questions and letters. In 1987 he shared Sports Illustrated's "Sportsmen and Sportswomen of the Year" award with seven others, characterized as "Athletes Who Care", for his work with numerous charities, including the Make-a-Wish Foundation, the Georgia March of Dimes and the American Heart Association.

One of his more memorable incidents was reminiscent of a scene from the classic black-and-white baseball film The Pride of the Yankees:

Before a home game against San Francisco on June 12, 1983, Murphy visited in the stands with Elizabeth Smith, a six-year-old girl who had lost both hands and a leg when she stepped on a live power line. After Murphy gave her a cap and a T shirt, her nurse innocently asked if he could hit a home run for Elizabeth. "I didn't know what to say, so I just sort of mumbled 'Well, O.K.,' " says Murphy. That day he hit two homers and drove in all the Braves' runs in a 3–2 victory.

He was ultimately granted several honors because of his integrity, character, and sportsmanship, including the Lou Gehrig Memorial Award (1985), "Sportsman of the Year" (1987), Roberto Clemente Award (1988), Bart Giamatti Community Service Award (1991), and World Sports Humanitarian Hall of Fame (1991 induction).

=== Hall of Fame candidacy ===
With his reputation as an outstanding all-around star player in the 1980s with multiple MVP awards and excellent power, Murphy was initially thought to be a strong candidate for election to the Baseball Hall of Fame. Of the 26 players ahead of him on the career home run list when he retired, 24 have been elected to the Hall; all were elected by the baseball writers, 16 of them in their first year of eligibility. The only two who have not been elected, Dave Kingman and Darrell Evans, ended their careers with batting averages below .250, and neither ever won a Gold Glove or finished higher than 11th in MVP voting. Murphy's 398 home runs placed him fourth among players who were primarily center fielders, behind only Willie Mays, Mickey Mantle and Duke Snider, who was then the most statistically similar player to Murphy. Of the National League's top ten right-handed home run leaders when he retired, Murphy is the only one who has not been elected:

1. Hank Aaron - 733
2. Willie Mays - 660
3. Mike Schmidt - 548
4. Ernie Banks - 512
5. Andre Dawson - 399
6. Dale Murphy - 398
7. Johnny Bench - 389
8. Gil Hodges - 370
9. Orlando Cepeda - 358
10. Ralph Kiner - 351

But a surge in home runs in the major leagues in the late 1990s and 2000s may have hindered his election; major league teams averaged 127 home runs per season in the 1980s, which increased to 149 in the 1990s and 174 in the 2000s. Murphy led the NL with totals of 36 and 37 home runs, not unusual for the 1980s, but there have been only four seasons since his retirement (excepting the abbreviated 2020 season) in which no NL player hit 40 home runs. He first appeared on the writers' ballot in 1999, but after gaining between 18% and 24% of the vote in his first three years on the ballot (election requires 75%), Murphy dropped below 15%, generally remaining between 8% and 12% before rising above 18% again in his 15th and final year on the ballot in 2013. As writers may only vote for ten players each year, some have argued that the candidacy of stars from the 1980s, such as Murphy, became imperiled as a wave of more recently retired players with more statistically impressive credentials became eligible in the 2010s. Noting his low vote totals, Murphy has said, "Since I'm not that close [to election] … I don't think about it that much." In failing to gain election, he joins Barry Bonds, Juan González, Roger Maris and Alex Rodriguez as the only Hall of Fame-eligible recipients of multiple MVP awards not in the Hall. His failed candidacy has drawn particular notice due to his reputation as a clean-living player whose career was immediately followed by baseball's scandal-plagued "steroids era." Only Maris of the aforementioned multi-MVP awardees not elected has such a reputation. Furthermore, no player who played primarily as a center fielder in the National League since Willie Mays was elected to the Hall until 2026 (Andre Dawson ultimately played more in right field than in center, and Ken Griffey Jr. starred primarily in the American League for over a decade before moving to the NL for several years).

Baseball writer Rob Neyer feels that the former MVP's candidacy has been hurt by a career that "got a late start and suffered an early end." Stuart Miller, baseball writer for The New York Times, also notes the "sharp decline" in production that plagued Murphy after the age of 31 in arguing, "Players who were great for a short time do not receive much [Hall of Fame] recognition." Finding "one of baseball's best players in the 1980s" to be "undervalued", Miller nonetheless writes that the Brave great "is typically considered a 'close but no' guy." Statistician Bill James says of Murphy, "It certainly wouldn't offend me to have him in the Hall of Fame. I just wouldn't advocate it." James set a metric for Hall induction as 300 win shares, a statistic weighing what players contribute to their team's victories. Murphy has 253 win shares; in 2003, James ranked eight Hall of Fame center fielders below Murphy, rating him the 12th greatest player at the position. However, Snider also had a sharp decline at the same age, only having one season of 60 RBI after turning 31. And Murphy's career statistics only through the 1987 season, after which he turned 32, are remarkably similar to the entire career of Ralph Kiner, who retired at 32 and was elected by the writers in 1975:

	G	AB	R	H	2B	3B	HR	RBI	BA	SA
Dale Murphy	1519	5583	928	1555	241	33	310	927	.279	.500
Ralph Kiner	1472	5205	971	1451	216	39	369	1015	.279	.548

A writer for the Charlotte Observer wrote, "Murphy's incredible nine-year run in Atlanta was every bit as good as anyone else during his era". Neyer notes that the explosion of power during the steroids-fueled era that began after Murphy's retirement may have caused Murphy's numbers to pale in comparison for many voters. Some have argued that Murphy's reputation for clean living may encourage voters to "look more favorably on what Murphy did without using performance-enhancing drugs." (Murphy has asserted that Barry Bonds "without a doubt" used performance-enhancing drugs.) Sports Illustrated's Joe Posnanski has endorsed Murphy as an "emotional pick … a larger-than-life character who signed every autograph, spoke up for every charity and played brilliant baseball every day for mostly doomed teams." The Baseball Project, a supergroup composed of Peter Buck, Mike Mills, Scott McCaughey, Steve Wynn and Linda Pitmon, wrote the song “To The Veterans Committee” advocating his election and praising him for meeting the voting criteria: ability, integrity, sportsmanship, character, and contributions to the team(s) on which the player played.

Since the expiration of Murphy's eligibility on the BBWAA ballot, his Hall of Fame candidacy has been considered twice by the Modern Era Baseball Committee, in 2018 and 2020, and twice by the Contemporary Baseball Era Players Committee in 2023 and 2026. He is eligible to be considered again for the 2029 class of inductees.

== Post-baseball life ==
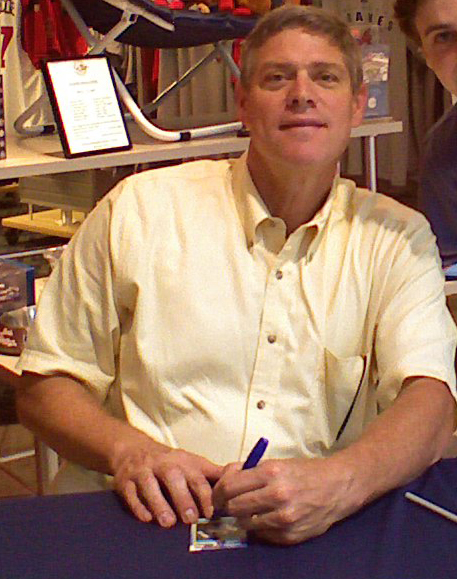
Murphy signing autographs in 2008.

From 1997 to 2000, Murphy served as president of the Massachusetts Boston Mission of the LDS Church.

In 2005, Murphy started a non-profit organization called the iWontCheat Foundation to promote ethical behavior, and deter steroid use and cheating in youth athletics. Since 2008 all players from the participating teams at the Little League World Series wear the "I WON'T CHEAT!" embroidered patch above the Little League Baseball logo on the left sleeve of their jerseys.

In 2008, he was appointed to the National Advisory Board for the national children's charity, Operation Kids. Murphy serves as a national advisor to ASCEND: A Humanitarian Alliance. Murphy is a long time supporter of Operation Smile and also currently serves on the organization's Board of Governors.

During the 2012 MLB season, Murphy was a part of the Atlanta Braves TV broadcasting crew and participated in the telecast of at least 14 games.

He was the first-base coach for the USA team in the 2013 World Baseball Classic.

In 2017 he opened a restaurant, Murph's, in Atlanta near Truist Park, where the Braves have played since the 2017 season. The restaurant closed in August 2025. Murphy lives in Alpine, Utah.

== Author ==
Murphy has written three books. The first, The Scouting Report on Professional Athletics, is about the professional athlete's lifestyle. Murphy discusses balancing career and family, working with agents, managing business affairs, serving one's community, and preparing for retirement. In his second book, an autobiography titled Murph, he talked about his religious faith. He discussed the struggles of his early baseball career and how he overcame problems. In 2007 Murphy wrote his third book, The Scouting Report for Youth Athletics, in response to what he saw as the increase in negative behavior in youth sports resulting from poor examples set by professional athletes. Included with each book is a 50-page insert which includes contributions from, among others, Peyton Manning, Dwyane Wade, Tom Glavine, and Danica Patrick. In a question-and-answer format, they discuss the lessons they learned from youth sports and how they apply the lessons today. There is also a physician-penned section about illegal performance-enhancing drug use in sports.

== Personal life ==
Murphy and his wife, Nancy, have eight children: sons Chad, Travis, Shawn, Tyson, Taylor, Jake, and McKay, and daughter Madison.

== See also ==
- 30–30 club
- List of Major League Baseball annual home run leaders
- List of Major League Baseball career runs scored leaders
- List of Major League Baseball career runs batted in leaders
- List of Major League Baseball annual runs batted in leaders
- List of Major League Baseball annual runs scored leaders
- List of Major League Baseball career hits leaders
- List of Major League Baseball career home run leaders
- List of Major League Baseball career strikeouts by batters leaders
- List of Major League Baseball consecutive games played leaders
- List of Major League Baseball career games played as an outfielder leaders
- List of Major League Baseball career games played as a center fielder leaders

Preceded by Bob Horner; Gary Matthews; Mel Hall; Keith Moreland; Eric Davis	National League Player of the Month; August 1980; April 1982; September 1983; September 1984 & April 1985; August 1986	Succeeded by Gary Carter; Tim Wallach; Tony Gwynn; Dave Parker; Steve Sax
