= San Pedro Sula Honduras Temple =

- Interactive map of San Pedro Sula Honduras Temple
- Number: 198
- Dedication: 13 October 2024, by Dale G. Renlund
- Site: 9 acres (3.6 ha)
- Floor area: 35,818 ft^{2} (3,327.6 m^{2})
- Official website • News & images

Church chronology
← Mendoza Argentina Temple	San Pedro Sula Honduras Temple	→ Salvador Brazil Temple

Additional information
- Announced: 7 April 2019, by Russell M. Nelson
- Groundbreaking: 5 September 2020, by José Hernández
- Open house: 12-28 September 2024
- Current president: Ricardo Valladares Banegas
- Location: San Pedro Sula, Honduras
- Coordinates: 15°31′22″N 88°02′13″W
- Baptistries: 1
- Ordinance rooms: 4
- Sealing rooms: 3

The San Pedro Sula Honduras Temple is a temple of the Church of Jesus Christ of Latter-day Saints in San Pedro Sula, Honduras. The intent to build the temple was announced on April 7, 2019, by church president Russell M. Nelson, during general conference. It is the second built in Honduras, and is the country’s northernmost temple.

A groundbreaking ceremony, to signify the beginning of construction was held, on September 5, 2020, with area seventy José Bernardo Hernández presiding. The temple was dedicated by Dale G. Renlund, a member of the Quorum of the Twelve Apostles, on October 13, 2024.

== History ==
The intent to construct the temple was announced by church president Russell M. Nelson on April 7, 2019, concurrently with 7 other temples. At the time, the number of operating or announced temples was 162.

On August 5, 2020, the church announced that the groundbreaking would take place the following month, and released an exterior rendering of the temple. The groundbreaking ceremony on September 5, signified the beginning of construction. It is the second temple in Honduras.

On May 28, 2024, the church announced the public open house which was held from September 12-28, 2024. The San Pedro Sula Honduras Temple was dedicated on October 13, 2024, by Dale G. Renlund.

== Design and architecture ==
The building’s architectural style is inspired by the religious and historical styles of the region, and traditional design Latter-day Saint temple design.

The temple sits on a 9-acre plot, and the landscaping around the temple features a water fountain, as well as native trees, shrubs, and plants. The structure stands one story tall and the exterior includes a tower built using Moleanos limestone from Portugal.

The interior features art-glass windows and millwork, centered around design motifs which were “influenced by geometric interpretations of the country’s flowers and vegetation as well as local pottery and textile patterns.” There are several original paintings throughout the temple. The temple includes four instruction rooms, three sealing rooms, and a baptistry, each arranged for ceremonial use.

The design uses elements representing the natural landscapes of Honduras, providing deeper spiritual meaning to the temple's appearance and function. Symbolism is important to church members and includes the colors used in the temple’s interior decorations. Shades of turquoise and green were used to represent “waters, nature and bird plumage,” while orange, yellow, and brick red symbolized “the subtropical zone.”

== Temple presidents ==
The church's temples are directed by a temple president and matron, each serving for a term of three years. The president and matron oversee the administration of temple operations and provide guidance and training for both temple patrons and staff. As of 2024, the president and matron of the newly-constructed temple are Ricardo and Eleana Valladares.

== Admittance ==
On May 28, 2024, the church announced that a public open house would be held from September 12-28, 2024 (excluding Sundays). The temple was dedicated by Dale G. Renlund on October 13, 2024. Like all the church's temples, it is not used for Sunday worship services. To members of the church, temples are regarded as sacred houses of the Lord. Once dedicated, only church members with a current temple recommend can enter for worship.

== See also ==

Temples in Central America
= Operating
= Under construction
= Announced
= Temporarily Closed

- The Church of Jesus Christ of Latter-day Saints in Honduras
- Comparison of temples of The Church of Jesus Christ of Latter-day Saints
- List of temples of The Church of Jesus Christ of Latter-day Saints
- List of temples of The Church of Jesus Christ of Latter-day Saints by geographic region
- Temple architecture (Latter-day Saints)
