= San Salvador El Salvador Temple =

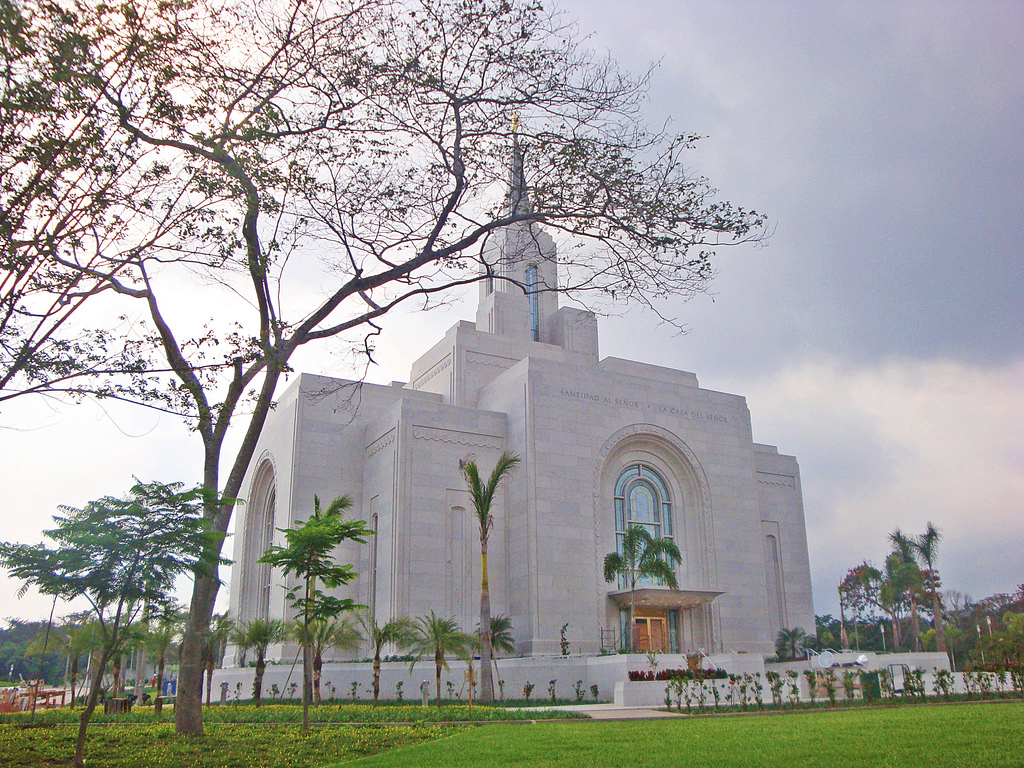
- The Temple in late April 2011
- Interactive map of San Salvador El Salvador Temple
- Number: 135
- Dedication: 21 August 2011, by Henry B. Eyring
- Site: 6.5 acres (2.6 ha)
- Floor area: 27,986 ft^{2} (2,600.0 m^{2})
- Official website • News & images

Church chronology
← Kyiv Ukraine Temple	San Salvador El Salvador Temple	→ Quetzaltenango Guatemala Temple

Additional information
- Announced: 18 November 2007, by Gordon B. Hinckley
- Groundbreaking: 20 September 2008, by Don R. Clarke
- Open house: 1-23 July 2011
- Current president: Ángel Antonio Duarte Escobar
- Location: Antiguo Cuscatlán, El Salvador
- Coordinates: 13°41′0.0492″N 89°14′48.5592″W
- Exterior finish: Branco Sienna Granite from Brazil
- Baptistries: 1
- Ordinance rooms: 2 (two-stage progressive)
- Sealing rooms: 2
- Notes: Announced in a letter dated 7 November 2007 from the First Presidency to priesthood leaders. The public open house was held from Friday, 1 July 2011, until Saturday, 23 July 2011, following which the temple was dedicated on Sunday, 21 August 2011, in three sessions.

The San Salvador El Salvador Temple is the 135th temple of the Church of Jesus Christ of Latter-day Saints. It is the fourth temple to be built in Central America and the first in El Salvador. The intent to build the temple was announced on November 18, 2007, in a statement from the church's First Presidency.

This temple was designed by VCBO Architecture. A groundbreaking ceremony, to signify the beginning of construction, was held on 20 September 2008, conducted by Don R. Clarke.

== History ==
Announced in 2007, construction began on the temple in September 2008. On 20 September, ground was broken and the site was dedicated by Don R. Clarke, of the Seventy and president of the church's Central America Area.

The temple is in Antiguo Cuscatlán, an affluent district southwest of San Salvador. The San Salvador volcano provides a background for the temple grounds and the three-story building.

After construction was completed, a public open house was held from 1 to 23 July 2011. The temple was dedicated by Henry B. Eyring on 21 August 2011, in three sessions.

In 2020, like all the church's others, the San Salvador El Salvador Temple was closed for a time in response to the COVID-19 pandemic.

== Design and architecture ==
The temple is on a 6.5-acre plot, with surrounding landscaping of palm trees and tropical bushes. It is constructed with Branco Sienna granite. The temple has a single attached end spire with a statue of the angel Moroni at the top. The exterior has "arches and conches inside and out, giving it a Spanish colonial touch found in the San Salvador region."

The interior has art-glass windows, granite, and woodwork, designed to create a spiritually uplifting environment. It also has paintings and artwork of the Salvadoran landscape. The interior design uses a flor de izote-El Salvador’s national flower-motif. The temple includes two ordinance rooms, two sealing rooms, and a baptistry, each designed for ceremonial use.

The design has symbolic elements to provide deeper spiritual meaning to the temple's appearance and function. Symbolism is important to church members, and include the interior use of El Salvador’s national flower, the flor de izote. The flor de izote is a symbol of fertility, wealth, and abundance.

== Temple presidents ==
The church's temples are directed by a temple president and matron, each serving for a term of three years. The president and matron oversee the administration of temple operations and provide guidance and training for both temple patrons and staff.

Serving from 2011 to 2014, the first temple president was Walter R. Petersen, with Eileen M. Petersen as matron. As of 2024, the president and matron are E. Tiberio Santos and Olimpia Santos.

== Admittance ==
On 9 February 2011, the church announced the public open house that was held on 1–23 July 2011 (excluding Sundays). During the open house, 165,790 people toured the temple. The temple was dedicated by Henry B. Eyring on 21 August 2011.

Like all the church's temples, it is not used for Sunday worship services. To members of the church, temples are regarded as sacred houses of the Lord. Once dedicated, only church members with a current temple recommend can enter for worship.

== Gallery ==
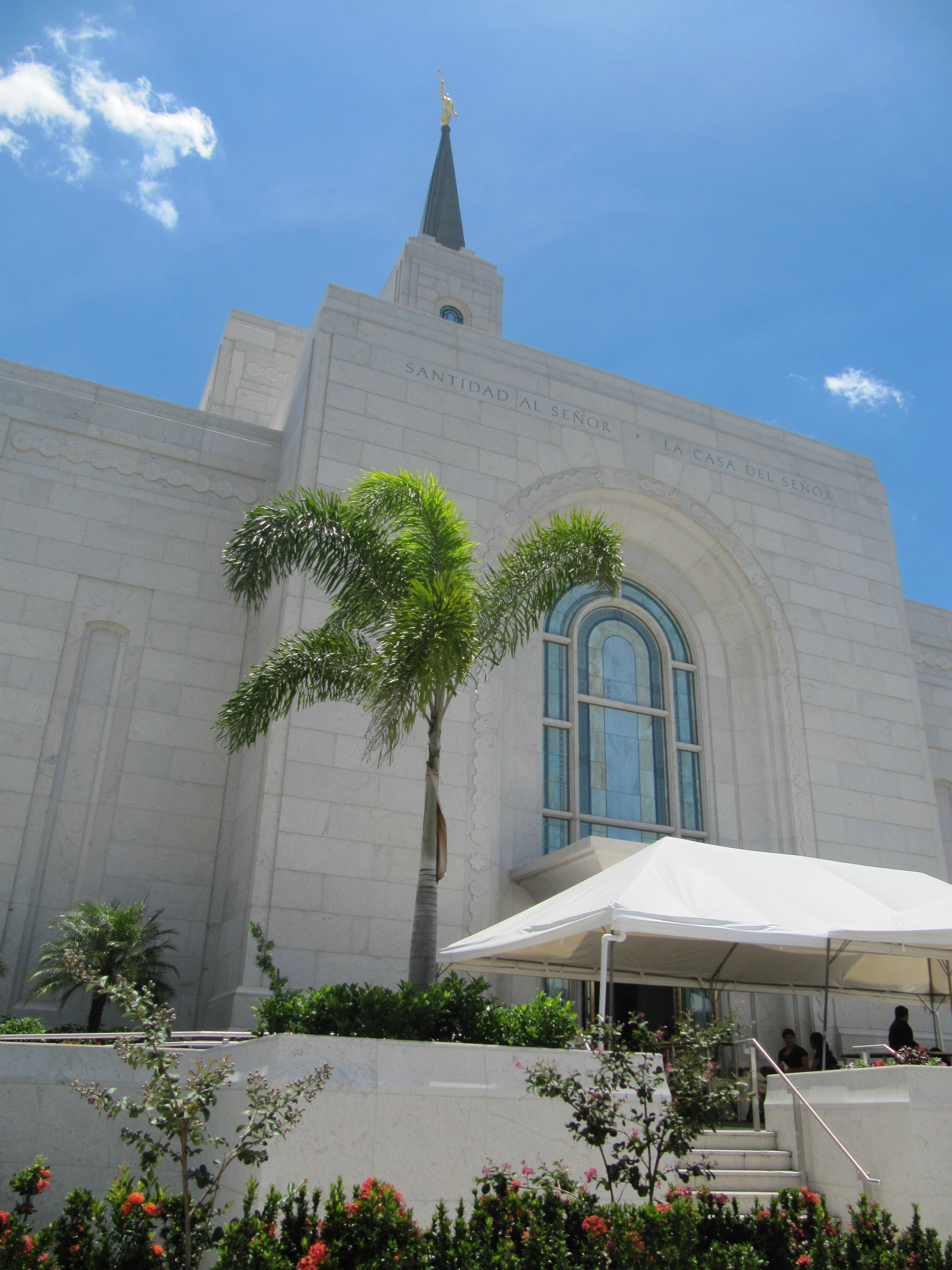

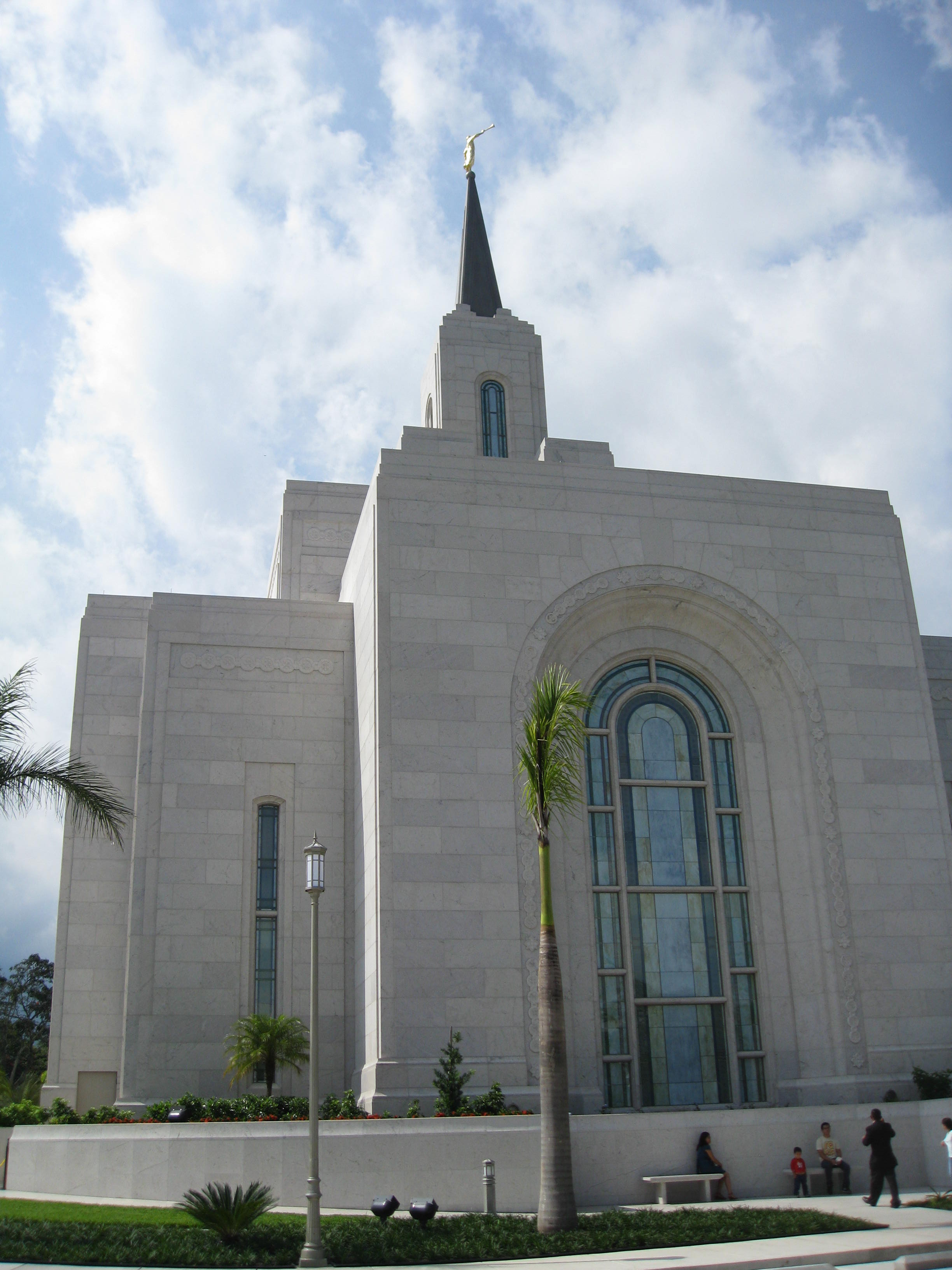

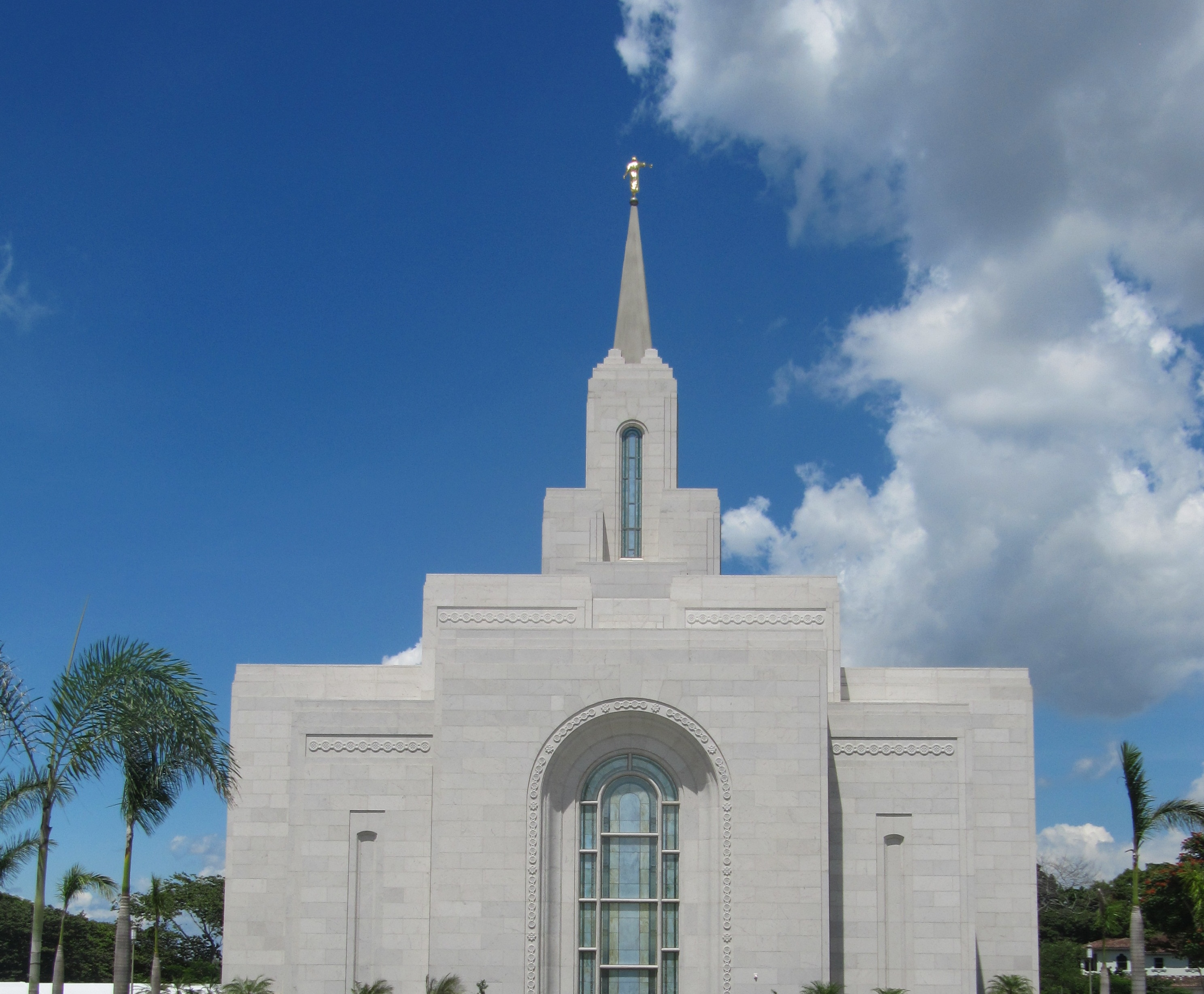

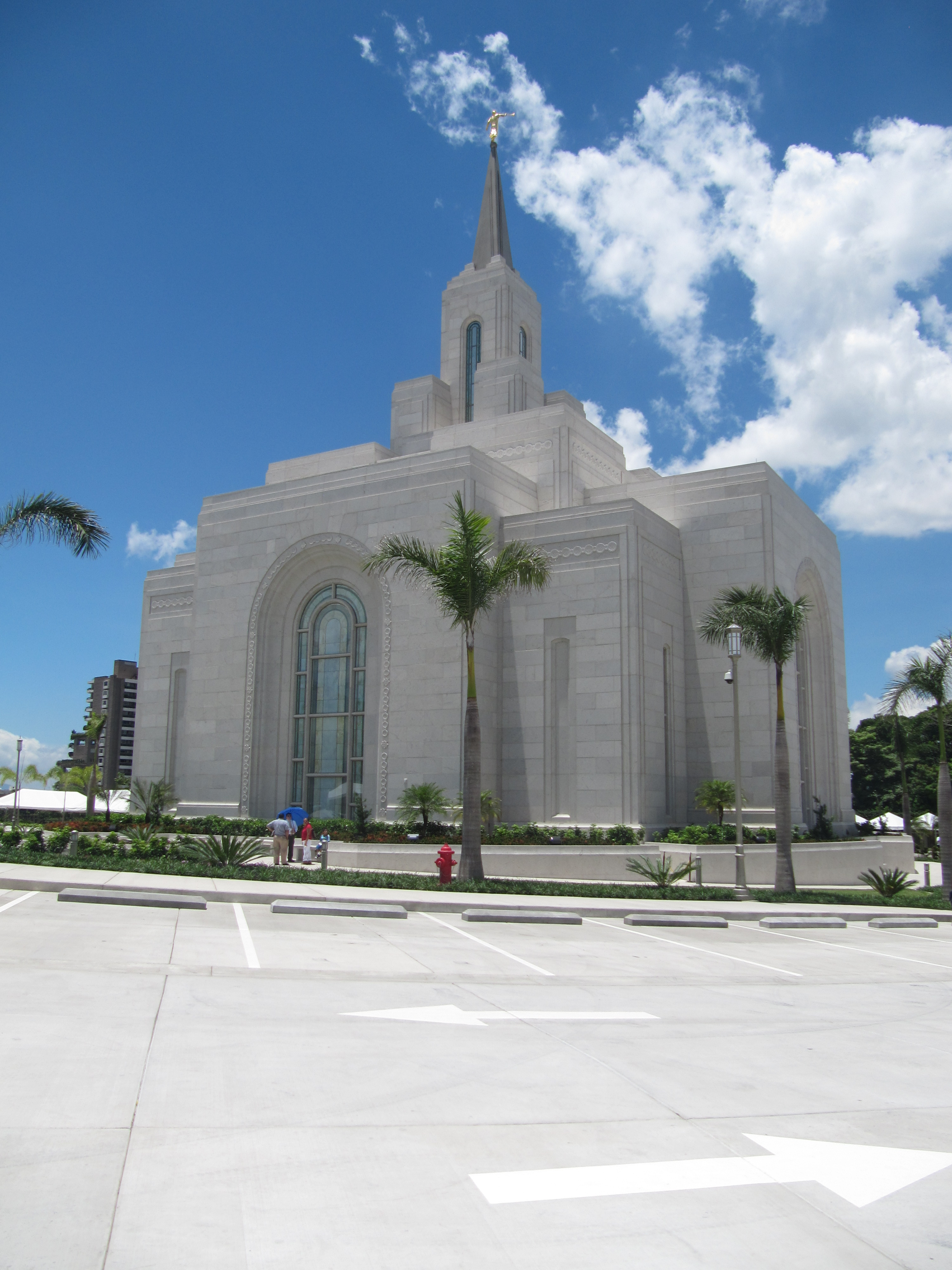

== See also ==

Temples in Central America
= Operating
= Under construction
= Announced
= Temporarily Closed

- Comparison of temples of The Church of Jesus Christ of Latter-day Saints
- List of temples of The Church of Jesus Christ of Latter-day Saints
- List of temples of The Church of Jesus Christ of Latter-day Saints by geographic region
- Temple architecture (Latter-day Saints)
