= Don R. Clarke =

American Mormon leader (born 1945)

Second Quorum of the Seventy
- April 1, 2006 – April 2, 2011
- Called by: Gordon B. Hinckley
- End reason: Transferred to First Quorum of the Seventy

First Quorum of the Seventy
- April 2, 2011 – October 3, 2015
- Called by: Thomas S. Monson
- End reason: Granted general authority emeritus status

Emeritus general authority
- October 3, 2015
- Called by: Thomas S. Monson

Personal details
- Born: Don Ray Clarke; December 11, 1945 (age 80); Rexburg, Idaho, United States

Don Ray Clarke (born December 11, 1945) has been a general authority of the Church of Jesus Christ of Latter-day Saints (LDS Church) since 2006.

In the 1960s, Clarke served as an LDS Church missionary in Argentina. He has a bachelor's degree from Brigham Young University and an MBA from Washington State University.

Although he began his career with Ford Motor Company, Clarke spent most of his career as an executive in retail companies. By the mid-1980s he was serving as chairman of May Department Store's Venture operation. He was chairman and CEO of Caldor Corporation from 1986 to 1998, both before and after it split from May Department Stores in 1989. Clarke then returned to work for May as president of Lord & Taylor. Clarke also served as a volunteer professor of business at Southern Virginia University and was involved with Ascend Humanitarian Alliance in beginning microcredit operations in Bolivia. Clark also served as an advisor on finances to Rodney K. Smith, president of Southern Virginia University.

== LDS Church service ==
Clarke has served in the LDS Church as a bishop, high councilor (in the Buena Vista, Virginia stake), stake Young Men president and stake president. He was president of the Bolivia Santa Cruz Mission from 2001 to 2004.

Clarke became an LDS Church general authority and member of the Second Quorum of the Seventy in 2006. In 2011, he was transferred to the First Quorum of the Seventy. Clarke served first as a counselor and then, from 2007 to 2011, as president of the church's Central America Area. While in this position, he presided at the ground-breaking ceremony for the San Salvador El Salvador Temple and conducted the ground-breaking ceremony for the Quetzaltenango Guatemala Temple. In 2015, he became an emeritus general authority. As of 2021, Clarke is president of the church's Utah correctional facilities district.

Clarke and his wife, Mary Ann Jackson, were married in 1970 and they are the parents of six children.
