= Francisco Lindor =

Puerto Rican baseball player (born 1993)

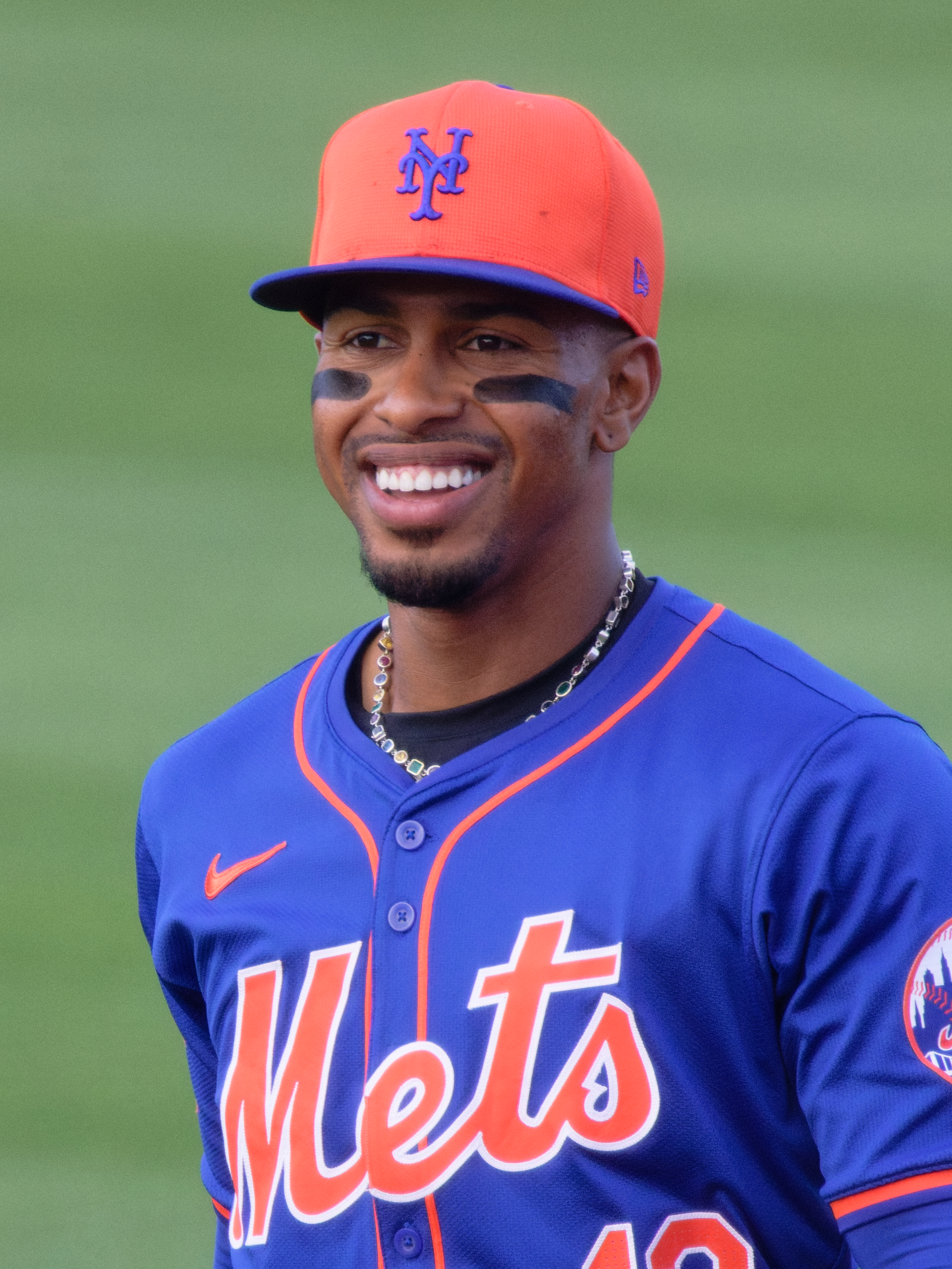
- Lindor with the New York Mets in 2024

New York Mets – No. 12
- Shortstop
- Born: November 14, 1993 (age 33); Caguas, Puerto Rico
- Bats: Switch Throws: Right

MLB debut
- June 14, 2015, for the Cleveland Indians

MLB statistics (through 2026 season)
- Batting average: .270
- Hits: 1,758
- Home runs: 300
- Runs batted in: 905
- Stolen bases: 219
- Stats at Baseball Reference

Teams
- Cleveland Indians (2015–2020); New York Mets (2021–present)

Career highlights and awards
- 5× All-Star (2016–2019, 2025); 2× Gold Glove Award (2016, 2019); 4× Silver Slugger Award (2017, 2018, 2023, 2024); Roberto Clemente Award (2026)
Medals
Men's baseball
Representing United States
World Youth Baseball Championship
Gold medal – first place	2009 Taiwan	Team
Representing Puerto Rico
World Baseball Classic
Silver medal – second place	2017 Los Angeles	Team

Francisco Miguel Lindor Serrano (born November 14, 1993), nicknamed "Mr. Smile", is a Puerto Rican professional baseball shortstop for the New York Mets of Major League Baseball (MLB). He has previously played in MLB for the Cleveland Indians. He is a right-handed thrower and switch hitter.

Born in Caguas, Puerto Rico, Lindor began playing baseball at an early age, and he moved with his family to Florida when he was 12. He became the Indians' first-round selection, and eighth overall, in the 2011 MLB draft. In the minor leagues, he participated in the 2012 All-Star Futures Game, and by 2013, was rated by Baseball America as the Indians' top overall prospect.

Lindor batted over .300 in both his first two major league seasons and provided elite defense. In 2016, he led the Indians to a World Series appearance and earned his first All-Star selection and Gold Glove Award, becoming the first Puerto Rican shortstop to win the Gold Glove Award. He placed second in the American League Rookie of the Year voting in 2015 and won his first Silver Slugger Award in 2017. During the 2017 World Baseball Classic, playing for the Puerto Rico national baseball team, Lindor was named to the 2017 All-WBC Team. Lindor was traded to the Mets following the 2020 season and later signed a 10-year, $341 million extension with the team. In 2023, he joined the 30–30 club for the first time. Since 2016, Lindor has made the All-Star Game five times, won four Silver Slugger Awards, two Gold Gloves, a Platinum Glove, and the prestigious Roberto Clemente Award.

== Early life ==
Lindor was born in Caguas, Puerto Rico, on November 14, 1993, the third of four children of Miguel Angel Lindor and Maria Serrano. He began playing baseball at a young age, assisted by his father, who would hit him ground balls from the top of a hill while the younger Lindor stood partway down the slope, attempting to field them. Lindor's favorite baseball players as a child were all middle infielders: Roberto Alomar, Omar Vizquel, Derek Jeter, Jimmy Rollins and Barry Larkin.

Lindor moved to Central Florida at the age of 12, with his father, stepmother, and youngest sibling, and was enrolled at the Montverde Academy prep school. After he signed with the Cleveland Indians in August 2011, his mother and two older siblings joined him in Florida.

== Professional career ==
=== Draft and early career ===
Lindor attended Montverde Academy in Montverde, Florida. The school's baseball facility was named after him in 2013. He was named to the USA Today All-USA high school baseball team. The Indians drafted Lindor in the first round (eighth overall) of the 2011 MLB draft. He had a full-ride scholarship offer in place with the Florida State Seminoles baseball team but chose to sign with the Indians for $2.9 million in August. In September, Lindor was drafted by the Indios de Mayagüez in the second round of the Liga de Béisbol Profesional Roberto Clemente's (LBPRC) first-year draft. However, he has been unable to play there due to Cleveland's intervention. On May 7, 2014, the Indios de Mayagüez traded Lindor's LBPRC player rights to the Gigantes de Carolina in exchange for Carlos Correa. However, only two weeks later the Cangrejeros de Santurce signed him by exploiting a legal loophole declaring that any player that has not been officially contracted within three years after being drafted is considered a free agent.

=== Minor leagues (2011–2015) ===
Lindor began his professional career with the Low-A New York–Penn League Mahoning Valley Scrappers during the 2011 season and appeared in four games. MLB.com rated Lindor as the 32nd best prospect in baseball before the 2012 season. He was assigned to the Lake County Captains of the Single-A Midwest League, and named to appear in the 2012 All-Star Futures Game. In 122 games for Lake County, Lindor had a .257 batting average with six home runs, 42 RBI, 33 extra-base hits and 27 stolen bases.

Prior to the 2012 season, Baseball America ranked him as the Indians top prospect. Lindor started the 2013 season with the Carolina Mudcats of the High-A Carolina League. He was promoted to the Akron Aeros of the Double-A Eastern League on July 15, 2013. Between the two affiliates, Lindor batted .303 with two home runs, 34 RBI, 31 extra-base hits, and 25 stolen bases in 104 games.

Lindor began the 2014 season with Akron. The Indians promoted Lindor to the Columbus Clippers of the Triple-A International League on July 21, 2014. In 126 games between the two clubs, he batted .276 with 11 home runs, 62 RBIs, and 28 stolen bases. Lindor began the 2015 season with Columbus.

=== Cleveland Indians (2015–2020) ===
==== 2015 ====
The Indians purchased Lindor's contract from Columbus on June 14, 2015, and added him to the active roster. In 59 games for Columbus prior to his promotion, he was batting .284 with two home runs and 22 RBIs. He made his debut with the Indians that day as a pinch hitter. He stayed in the game and recorded his first major league hit. Lindor won the American League Rookie of the Month Award for September, during which he batted .362. He finished the 2015 season with a .313 batting average, 12 home runs, 51 RBIs, 12 stolen bases and 22 doubles in 99 games for the Indians. He placed second in the AL Rookie of the Year Award voting.

==== 2016: World Series ====
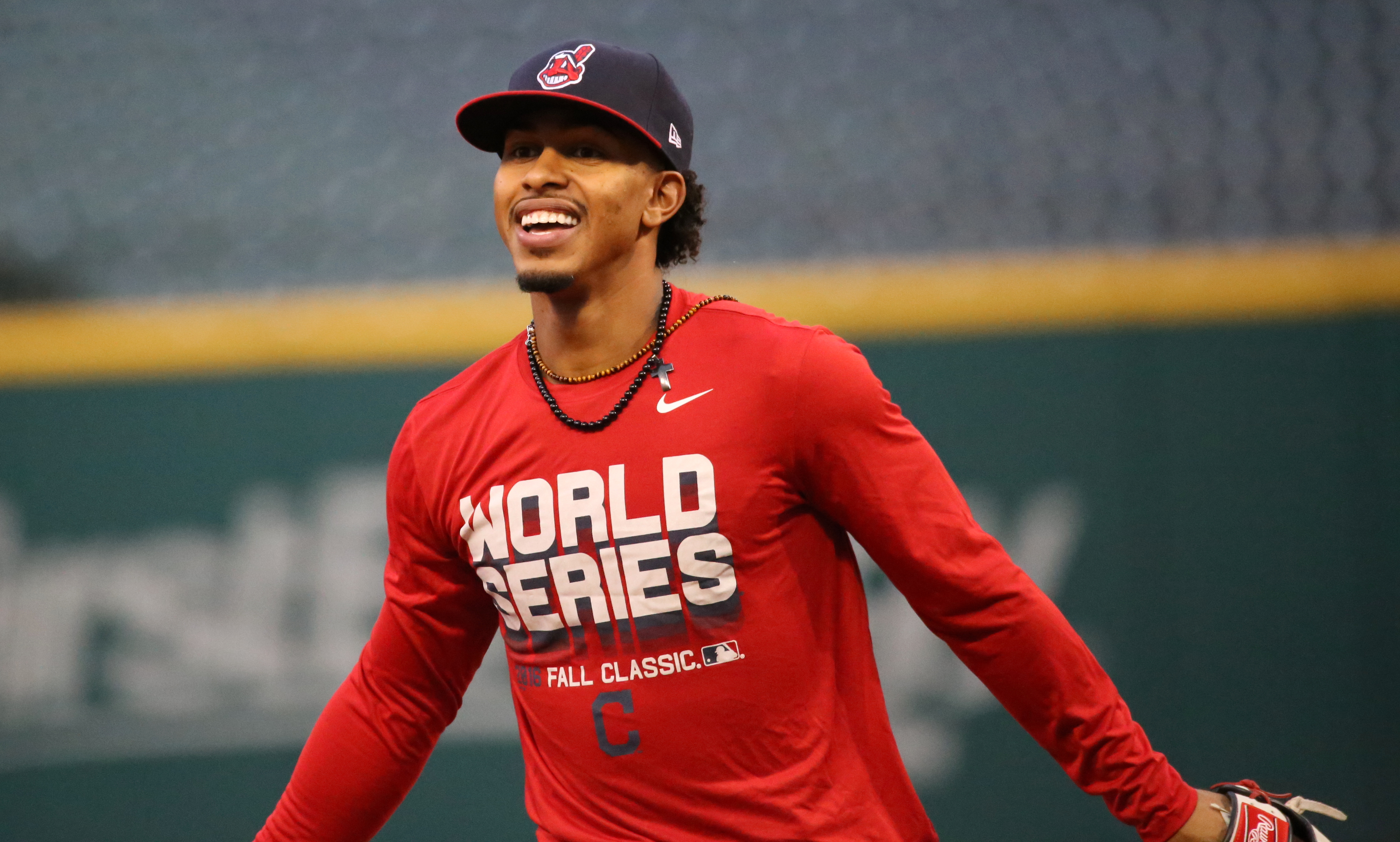
Lindor with the Indians during the 2016 World Series

In 2016, Lindor finished the season with a .301 batting average, 15 home runs, 78 RBIs, 19 stolen bases, 15 sacrifice flies (leading the majors), and 30 doubles in 158 games for the Indians. He was named a Gold Glove Award finalist at shortstop along with Jose Iglesias and Andrelton Simmons. In the 2016 MLB postseason, Lindor's seven multi-hit games broke the record for most ever for a player less than 23 years old. His 16 postseason hits are also the most hits by a batter since 1997, and he's the youngest Cleveland batter to have six World Series hits. Following the 2016 season, Lindor was presented with his first Gold Glove Award and first Platinum Glove Award. Lindor was the 2016 Esurance MLB/This Year in Baseball Award winner for Best Defensive Player. He finished ninth in the AL Most Valuable Player Award (MVP) voting.

==== 2017 ====
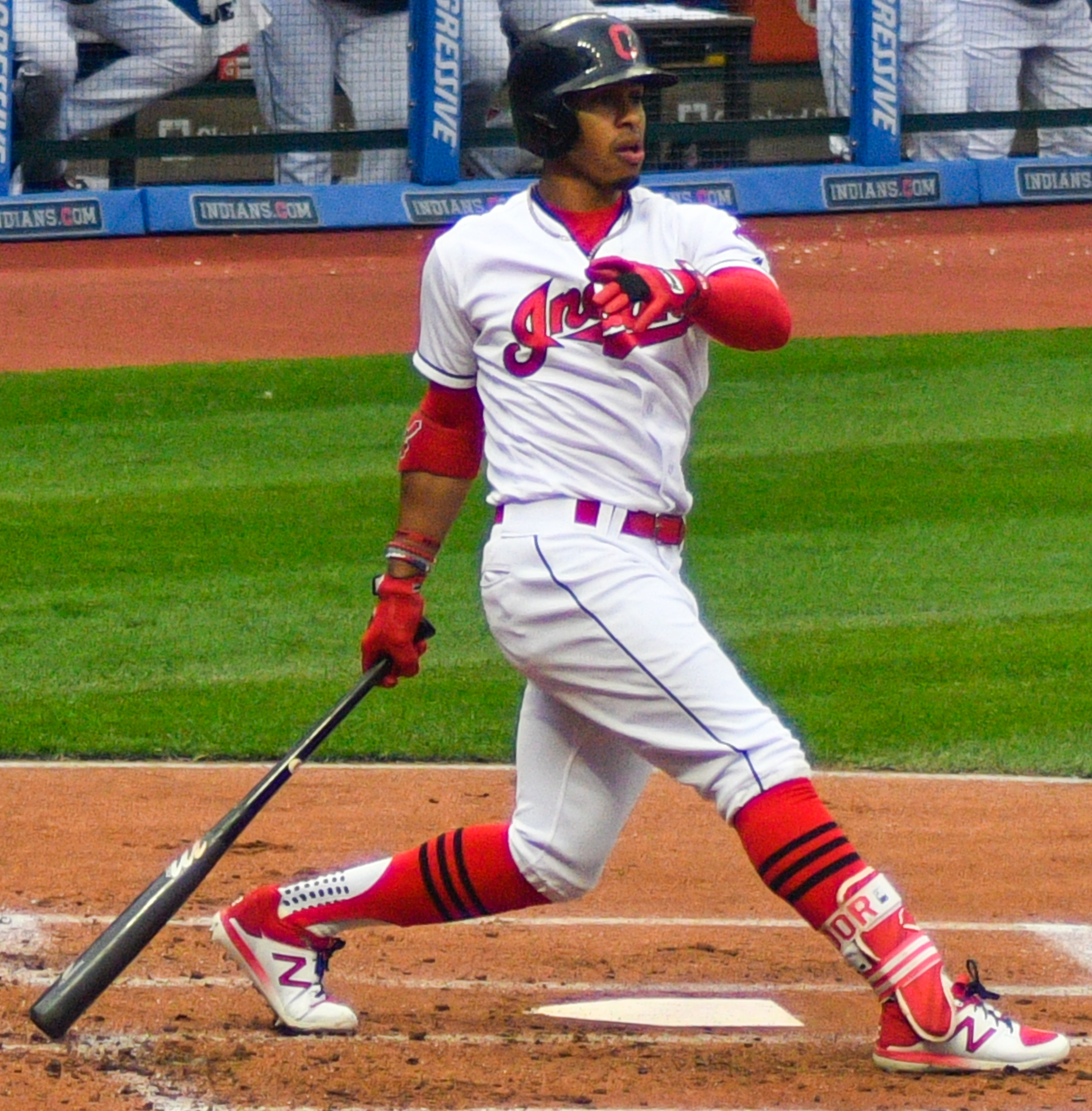
Lindor with the Indians in 2017

On April 5, 2017, Lindor hit his first career grand slam, doing so against the Texas Rangers, as the Indians won 9−6 and swept the season-opening series. On July 22, Lindor hit his first career walk-off home run in the 10th inning versus the Toronto Blue Jays for a 2−1 victory.

In Game 2 of the 2017 AL Division Series against the New York Yankees, Lindor became the third shortstop in major league history to hit a grand slam in the postseason.

In 159 games for Cleveland, Lindor batted .273 with 33 home runs and 89 RBIs. End of season awards for Lindor in 2017 included selection as shortstop on Baseball America's All-MLB Team, and his first career Silver Slugger Award at shortstop. He finished fifth in the AL MVP voting, and was selected as the cover athlete of the video game R.B.I. Baseball 18.

==== 2018 ====
Lindor won the first two AL Player of the Week Awards of his career in consecutive weeks of May 6 and 13, 2018. For the week of May 6, he led MLB with 17 hits, 11 runs scored, and 33 total bases over eight games. He also batted .426 with four doubles and four home runs. However, he committed critical errors on consecutive dates that led to losses against the New York Yankees in both games. The following week, he hit four home runs and five RBI. In the May 12 game versus the Kansas City Royals, Lindor both homered and doubled twice. On June 1, he again homered twice and doubled twice versus the Minnesota Twins, including hitting the game-winning home run in the eighth inning. He became the fourth player in history to produce at least two doubles and two home runs in a single game twice in one season, following Rafael Palmeiro (1993), Jim Edmonds (2003), and Adrián Beltré (2007). Due to his tremendous month of May, Lindor was named AL Player of the Month. He led all players with 44 hits and 27 runs scored. His .373 batting average was third and his 1.169 OPS was placed fourth among all players in at least 100 plate appearances.

Lindor collected three hits and four runs scored including a home run, on July 1 against the Oakland Athletics. On July 2, he homered twice, including a grand slam and another for three runs, for a career-high seven RBI to power a 9–3 victory over the Royals. He became the second shortstop in the franchise history to drive in seven runs in a game, following Chico Carrasquel against the Kansas City Athletics on April 26, 1956. On July 9, Lindor was selected to the 2018 All-Star Game, his third consecutive All-Star appearance. On July 10, Lindor scored his 80th run before the All-Star break, thus breaking the record for most by a Puerto Rican MLB player which was previously 79 runs in 1996 by Edgar Martínez. On August 8, Lindor hit a three-run walk-off home run in the 9th inning versus the Minnesota Twins for a 5–2 victory. For the season, he batted .277 and was 3rd in the league in power–speed number (30.2), winning the Silver Slugger Award in consecutive years.

Lindor was the lone offensive spark for the Indians in the 2018 AL Division Series, batting .364 with 2 home runs, but the Indians were swept in 3 games by the Houston Astros. Outside of Lindor, the rest of the team batted .144 in the three-game sweep and bowed out of the playoffs in the first round for the second year in a row.

==== 2019 ====
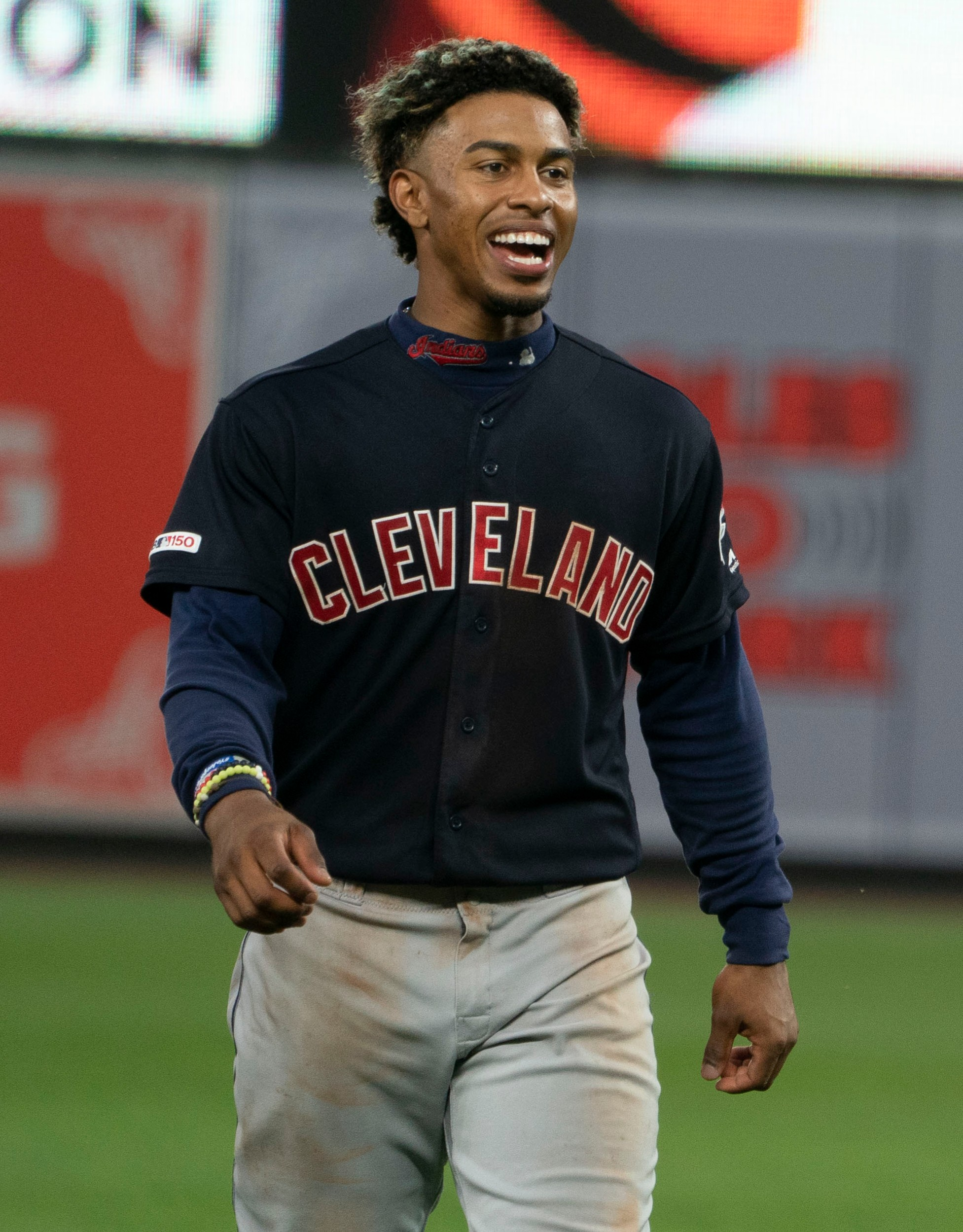
Lindor with the Indians in 2019

On April 26, 2019, Lindor hit two home runs to lead the Indians to a 6–3 victory over the Houston Astros. They were the 100th and 101st home runs of his career, and it was the ninth multi-home run game of his career. After the season Lindor was again an All-Star and won his second Gold Glove Award at shortstop. He played in 143 games for Cleveland, batting .284/.335/.518 with 32 home runs, 22 stolen bases, and 74 RBI. He finished fifteenth in MVP voting.

==== 2020: Final season with the Indians ====
Lindor struggled in 2020, as he batted .258 with eight home runs and 27 RBIs in the COVID-19 pandemic shortened-60 game season. His batting average, on-base percentage, slugging percentage and wRC+ were all career worsts and he struggled especially against breaking pitches. His defense, however, remained among the best in the league.

=== New York Mets (2021–present) ===
On January 7, 2021, the Indians traded Lindor and Carlos Carrasco to the New York Mets for Amed Rosario, Andrés Giménez, Josh Wolf, and Isaiah Greene.

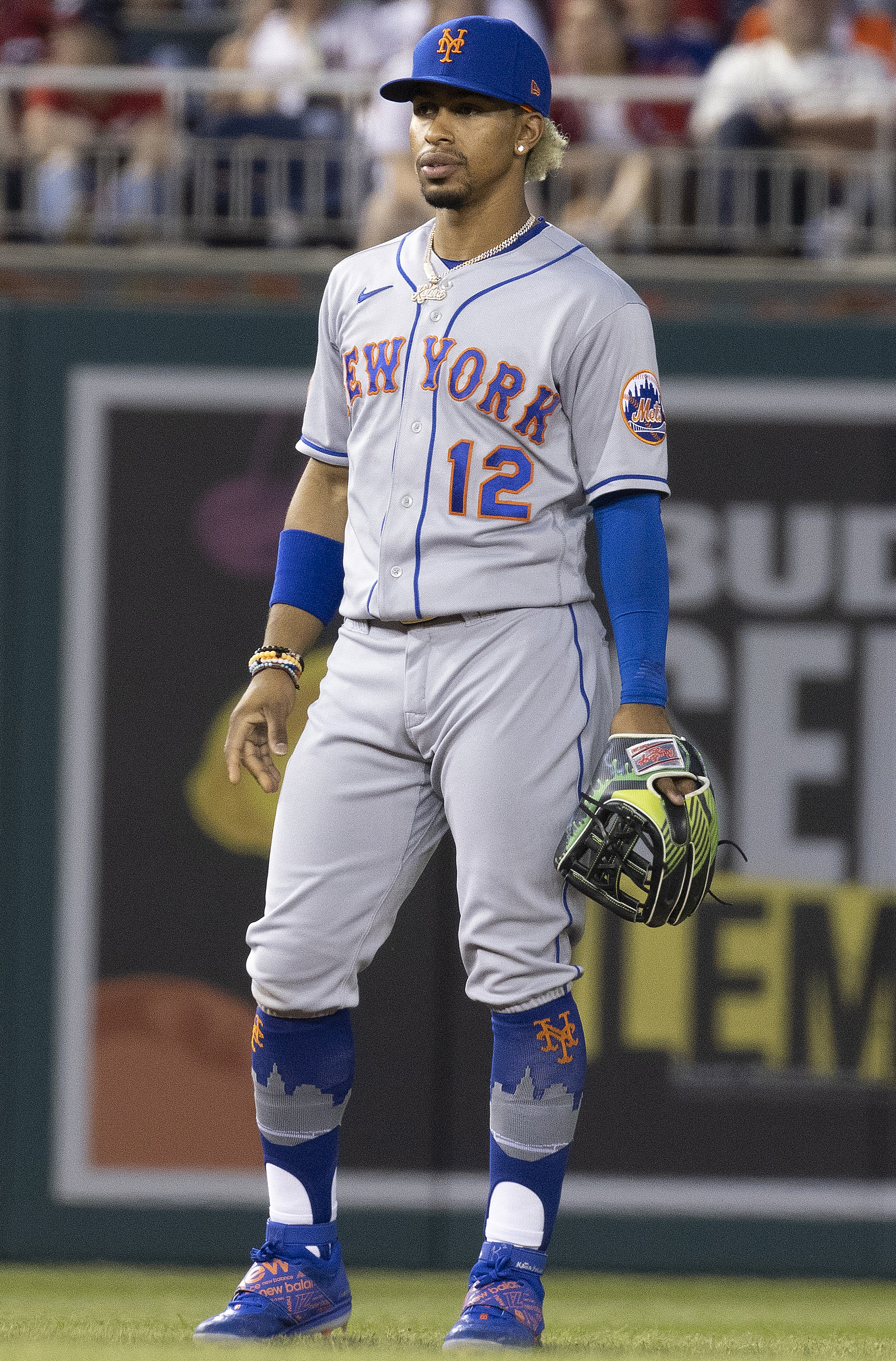
Lindor with the Mets in 2021

==== 2021 ====
On March 31, 2021, just hours before Lindor's deadline of Opening Day on April 1, the Mets and Lindor agreed to a 10-year, $341 million extension that would keep him with the team through 2031. Lindor struggled during the first half of the 2021 season and was booed by the Citi Field home crowd on multiple occasions. Lindor went 3-for-4 with two home runs off of Washington Nationals starter Joe Ross, accounting for all five RBIs in the Mets' 5–1 victory on June 19. In a Subway Series showdown on September 12, Lindor hit three home runs in the same game for the first time in his career. The boys of Puerto Rican podcast "Los Del Colegio Podcast" created the chant "Lindor es tu papá" which means "Lindor is your daddy", referring to an altercation with Giancarlo Stanton in that game. He finished the season batting .230/.322/.412 with 20 home runs, 10 stolen bases, and 63 RBI in 125 games played.

==== 2022 ====
On May 31, 2022, Lindor was named National League Player of the Week. He drove in a run in every game during that week and slashed .348/.407/.870. It was his third time receiving that distinction in either league, and his first time with the Mets. He also notched the 500th RBI of his career on May 23, as he brought home two runs on a ground-rule double to lead the Mets to a 13–3 victory at Oracle Park. On August 14, Lindor recorded his 82nd RBI of the season, breaking José Reyes' Mets franchise record for the most RBIs recorded in a season by a shortstop, in a 6–0 victory over the Philadelphia Phillies. On September 15, Lindor hit his 24th home run of the season against the Pittsburgh Pirates, setting a new Mets single season record for most home runs by a shortstop. He also recorded his 93rd and 94th RBIs of the season, a new career high. Lindor finished the 2022 season batting .270/.339/.449 with 26 home runs, 16 stolen bases, and 107 RBI in 161 games played.

At the end of the season, Lindor was announced as the 2022 winner of the Marvin Miller Man of the Year Award. On December 6, 2022, Lindor was named to the All-MLB Second Team.

==== 2023 ====
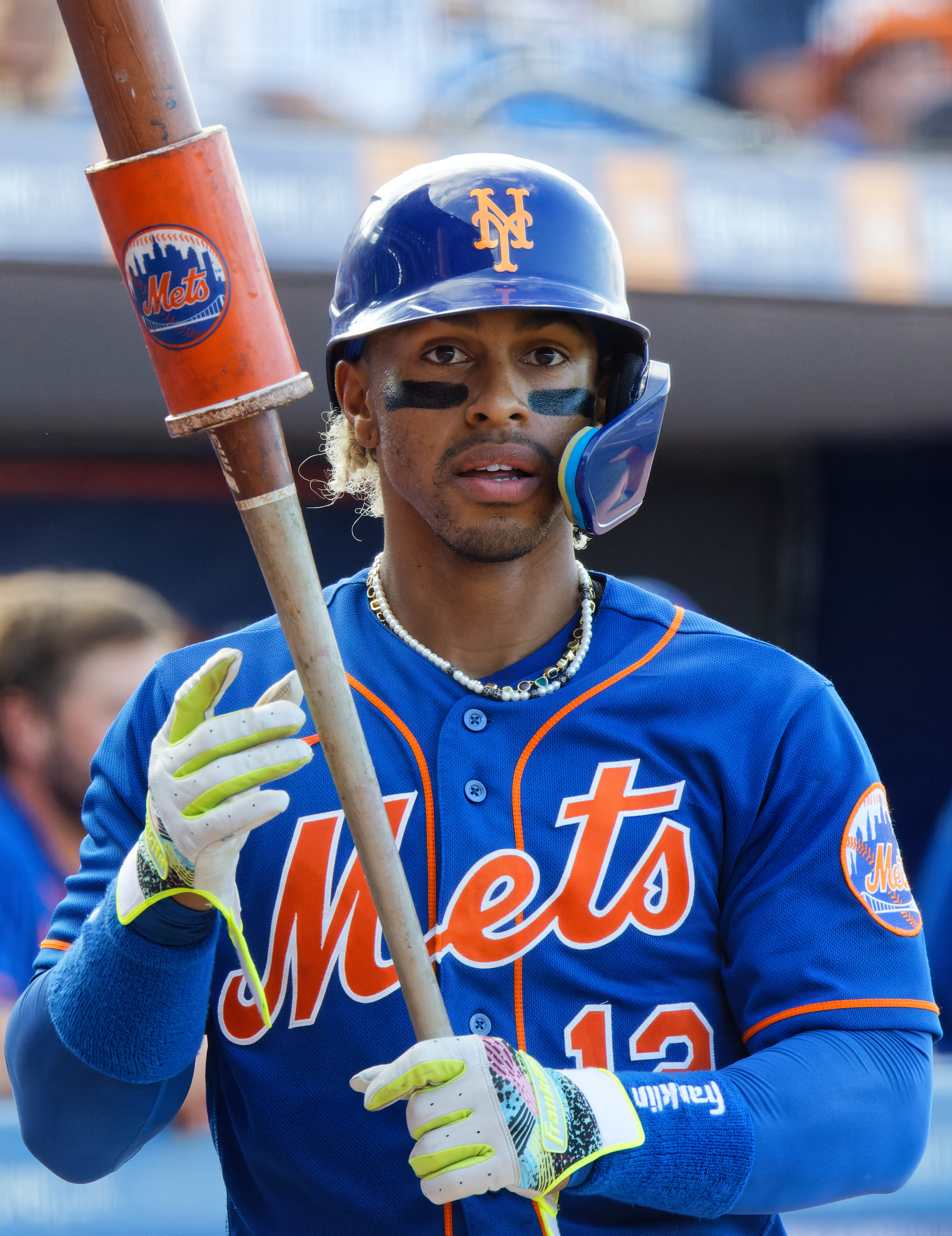
Lindor with the Mets in 2023

On June 27, 2023, during a game against the Milwaukee Brewers, Lindor hit his 200th career home run, off of pitcher Julio Teherán. On July 6 against the Arizona Diamondbacks, Lindor went 5-for-5 with two singles, two triples, and a home run with an RBI and three runs scored. He became the first shortstop in MLB history (and only the seventh player overall) to have a five-hit game that included two triples and at least one home run. Lindor is also the first player in Mets franchise history with two triples in the first three innings of a game. On September 27, Lindor hit three home runs in a doubleheader against the Miami Marlins, completing his first career 30–30 season. He became the fourth player in Mets history to accomplish the feat joining Darryl Strawberry, Howard Johnson, and David Wright. Lindor finished the 2023 season batting .254/.336/.470 with 31 home runs, 31 stolen bases, and 98 RBI in 160 games played.

After the season, Lindor was awarded his third career Silver Slugger Award, and his first since signing with the Mets. He was also awarded with a Gold Glove Award finalist along with Dansby Swanson and Ezequiel Tovar.

==== 2024 ====
After a slow start to the season, batting with a slash line of .197/.280/.359 in April, new manager Carlos Mendoza moved Lindor to the leadoff spot in the lineup on May 18. Over the next 46 games leading up to the All-Star break, he hit 18 doubles and nine home runs, batting in 27 runs and scoring 35 of his own, with a slash line of .290/.351/.520 in June. On August 21, Lindor hit his 25th home run of the season in a victory against the Baltimore Orioles, making him the first shortstop in MLB history to have three separate seasons with at least 25 home runs and 25 stolen bases, having done so already in 2018 and 2023.

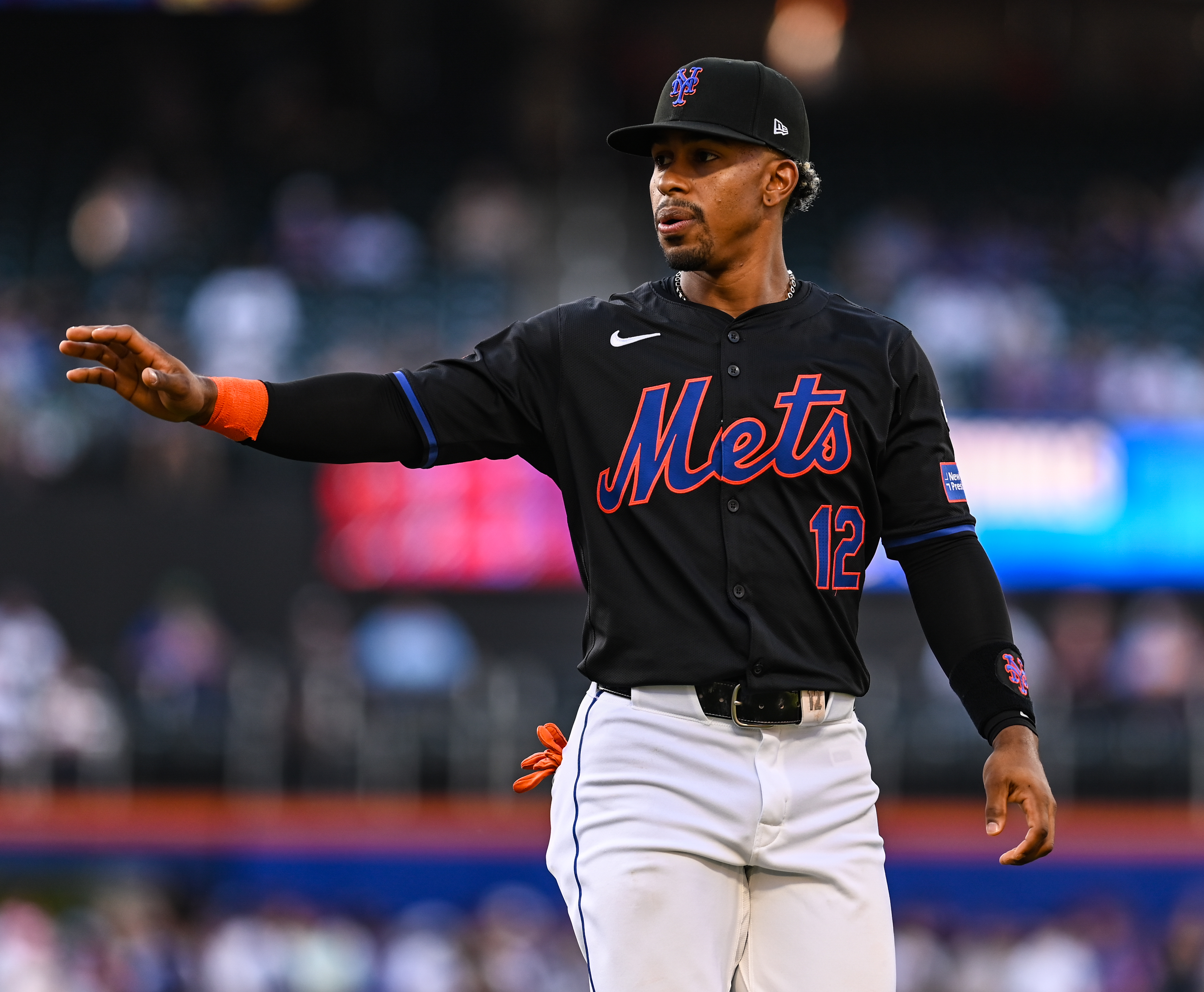
Lindor with the Mets in 2024

On August 26, Lindor was named National League Player of the Week. Across seven games, he scored six runs, hit three home runs including a grand slam against the San Diego Padres, four doubles, and a slash line of .348/.407/.870. On September 3, during a game against the Boston Red Sox, Lindor hit his 30th home run of the season, becoming the 3rd shortstop in MLB history with at least 5 seasons with 30 home runs as a shortstop, joining Ernie Banks (7) and Alex Rodriguez (7). He also stole his 26th base on the same day, making Lindor one of three Mets players with multiple seasons of at least 30 home runs and 25 steals, joining Howard Johnson and Darryl Strawberry.

On September 13, Lindor exited the game in the 7th inning against the Philadelphia Phillies due to lower back pain after an awkward slide at second base, and was unable to play the next day. While he was back in the lineup on September 15, Lindor was pulled after gingerly running to first base following a single. He eventually returned to the lineup again on September 27 against the Milwaukee Brewers in an 8–4 loss, going 2-for-4 with one walk. On September 30, in the penultimate game of the season, Lindor hit a go-ahead two-run homer in the top of the 9th inning to give the Mets an 8–7 lead over the Atlanta Braves, which proved the final score, and allowed the Mets to clinch a spot in the 2024 MLB postseason.

Lindor played in 152 games for the Mets in 2024, batting .273/.344/.500 with 33 home runs, 29 stolen bases, 107 runs scored, and 91 RBI.

In Game 4 of the 2024 NL Division Series against the Philadelphia Phillies, Lindor hit a grand slam off pitcher Carlos Estévez in the bottom of the 6th inning to lift the Mets to a 4–1 lead and propel them to the NL Championship Series. He became the third player, after Jim Thome and Shane Victorino, to hit two grand slams in the postseason, having previously done so in Game 2 of the 2017 AL Division Series. Across 13 postseason games, Lindor had 2 home runs and 8 RBI, scoring 11 runs and hitting to a slash line of .275/.387/.490.

After the conclusion of the postseason, Lindor was awarded his fourth Silver Slugger Award and named to the All-MLB Second Team for the third year in a row. He was also voted a National League MVP finalist, alongside Shohei Ohtani and Ketel Marte, for the first time in his career. Lindor ultimately finished second in MVP voting to the unanimous winner, Ohtani, earning 23 second-place votes and appearing in the top three on every ballot.

==== 2025 ====
On April 7, 2025, during a game against the Miami Marlins, Lindor notched his 1,500th career hit, a single to left field off of pitcher Tyler Phillips in the bottom of the 5th inning as he went 3-for-4 with three singles and a run in a 2–0 Mets victory. On April 18, Lindor hit his first walk-off home run as a Met, a solo blast to right field off of pitcher Ryan Fernandez, giving the Mets a 5–4 win over the St. Louis Cardinals. The walk-off was also Lindor's 250th career home run. On April 21, Lindor hit two home runs in a 5–4 victory over the Philadelphia Phillies, a lead off homer against Aaron Nola in the 1st inning, and a three-run blast off of José Ruiz in the 7th. This marked the 20th multi-home run game of his career, making Lindor the third shortstop in MLB history with 20 multi-homer games, after Ernie Banks (24) and Alex Rodriguez (33).

On June 1, Lindor hit the 261st home run of his career in a 5–3 victory over the Colorado Rockies, passing Derek Jeter for the fourth-most home runs by a shortstop in MLB history. On June 4, Lindor's right pinky toe was broken by a hit by pitch from Tony Gonsolin during a game against the Los Angeles Dodgers. This caused him to miss one game before returning to the lineup on June 6, as a pinch hitter with two outs in the ninth inning tied during a game against the Rockies at Coors Field. He hit a two-run double to give the Mets a 4–2 win, the first go-ahead pinch-hit RBI of his career, and he returned to the starting lineup the following game. The Mets won 28 straight games in which Lindor hit a home run, one short of tying the record of 29 held by Carl Furillo. This streak was broken on June 22, when he drove in the team's only run in a 7–1 loss to the Phillies.

On July 2, Lindor was selected as the National League's starting shortstop in the 2025 All-Star Game, marking his first selection as a Met and his fifth overall. He joins Bud Harrelson and José Reyes as the only Mets shortstops to start an All-Star Game. Lindor recorded his 200th career stolen base on July 12 in a 3–1 victory over the Kansas City Royals, becoming the third shortstop in MLB history with 200 home runs and 200 stolen bases, joining Jimmy Rollins and Derek Jeter.

On August 16, Lindor became the first MLB shortstop to have 5 seasons of 20 home runs and 20 stolen bases in his career. After Lindor went 14-for-25 (.560 average) on the week of August 12–17, he was awarded NL Player of the Week. On August 21, Lindor hit his 8th leadoff home run of the season, passing Curtis Granderson for the most leadoff home runs in a season by a Mets player. On August 29, Lindor stole his 25th base of the season in a victory against the Miami Marlins, making him the first shortstop in MLB history to have four separate seasons with at least 25 home runs and 25 stolen bases, having done so already in 2018, 2023, and 2024. On September 25, Lindor hit his 30th home run of the season against the Chicago Cubs, a solo home run in the third inning. With that homer, Lindor achieved his second career 30–30 season, his first since 2023, and became the second shortstop to ever have two of them, joining Bobby Witt Jr. With that, Lindor became the fifth player to join the 30–30 club in 2025. Also, he and teammate Juan Soto became the third set of teammates in MLB history to ever go 30–30 in the same season, joining Howard Johnson and Darryl Strawberry (1987) and Dante Bichette and Ellis Burks (1996).

Lindor played in 160 games for the Mets in 2025, batting .267/.346/.466 with 31 home runs, 31 stolen bases, and 86 RBI. On October 22, 2025, it was announced that Lindor had undergone a right elbow debridement procedure.

==== 2026 ====
On February 11, 2026, it was announced that Lindor would require surgery to repair a fractured hamate bone.

Lindor had a slow start to the season, and while he did improve after that, he suffered an injury on the basepaths in an April 22 game against the Minnesota Twins, forcing him on the injured list. He was reinstated from the IL for the second game of a June 24 doubleheader against the Chicago Cubs. On August 30, during a game against the Houston Astros, Lindor hit his 155th home run for the Mets (the 293rd of his career), passing Dave Kingman for 6th place on the Mets all-time home run list. On September 12, in a 12–2 victory over the New York Yankees, Lindor hit a leadoff home run in the first inning and a grand slam in the eighth inning. This marked the 24th multi-home run of Lindor's career, tying Ernie Banks for the second most multi-homer games in a shortstop's career. The eighth inning grand slam was also the 299th home run of Lindor's career, passing Banks for the third-most home runs by a primary shortstop in MLB history. On September 27, during the final game of the season against the Washington Nationals, Lindor hit his 300th career home run, becoming the fifth primary shortstop in MLB history to do so, and the first to hit 300 home runs and steal 200 bases.

Lindor played in 105 games for the Mets in 2026, batting .225/.309/.423 with 21 home runs, 3 stolen bases, 63 runs scored, and 49 RBI. After the season he won the Roberto Clemente Award for his off-field philanthropic work.

== International career ==
=== World Junior Baseball Championship (United States) ===
In 2010, Lindor played for the 18U United States team in the 2010 World Junior Baseball Championship, in Thunder Bay, Ontario. They finished in fifth place despite only losing one game. Lindor was named to the All-IBAF Juniors Team in his position at shortstop.

=== 2017 WBC ===
Lindor played for the Puerto Rican national team at the 2017 World Baseball Classic (WBC). He was selected the MVP of Pool D, where team Puerto Rico attained a 3–0 record. His offensive stats in the first round included five hits in 11 at bats for a .455 average, two HR, four RBI, and four runs scored. Puerto Rico went undefeated in the first and second rounds until losing to the United States in the championship game. Following the conclusion of the tournament, he was named to the 2017 All-WBC team.

=== 2023 WBC ===
Lindor once again played for the Puerto Rican national team at the 2023 World Baseball Classic and was made team captain after a vote from the players. He hit to a .450 average with six runs, five RBI, and one triple through five games. Lindor also ran out an inside-the-park home run in 15.7 seconds to secure a win against the Dominican Republic, a victory which ensured Puerto Rico's advancement to the quarterfinals and qualification for the 2026 World Baseball Classic. Puerto Rico then lost to Mexico in the quarterfinals, with Lindor going 2–5 on two singles in their final game.

=== 2026 WBC ===
Lindor planned to reprise his role as team captain for Puerto Rico in the 2026 World Baseball Classic. Five weeks before the tournament, Lindor was ruled ineligible to play by the WBC's insurance agency, due to the right elbow debridement procedure he had in October of 2025, making him uninsurable.

== Personal life ==
Lindor married his wife Katia (née Reguero) on December 16, 2021, in Miami, Florida. They have two daughters and one son.

On September 16, 2025, Katia performed the Star-Spangled Banner on the violin at a Mets game. She hosts the Unaparent podcast. In December 2025, she was named to New York City Mayor-Elect Zohran Mamdani's inaugural committee.

In December 2025, the Lindors purchased an Upper East Side penthouse for $21.2 million.

== Awards and accomplishments ==
Championships earned or shared
Title	Times	Dates	Ref
American League champion	1	2016	

Awards received
Name of award	Times	Dates (Ranking or event)	Ref
Major leagues
Major League Baseball All-Star	5	2016, 2017, 2018, 2019, 2025	
All-MLB Second Team	3	2022, 2023, 2024	
American League Rookie of the Month	1	September 2015	
American League Player of the Month	1	May 2018	
American/National League Player of the Week	5	May 6, 2018; May 13, 2018; May 29, 2022; August 25, 2024; August 17, 2025;	
Gold Glove Award at shortstop	2	2016, 2019	
Platinum Glove Award at shortstop	1	2016	
Silver Slugger Award at shortstop	4	2017, 2018, 2023, 2024	
Marvin Miller Man of the Year Award	1	2022	
Roberto Clemente Award	1	2026	
Minor leagues
All-Star	5	Midwest League (2012 mid-season, 2012 post-season); Carolina League (2013 mid-season, 2013, post-season); Eastern League (2014 mid-season)	
All-Star Futures Game	3	2012, 2013, 2014	
International League Player of the Week	1	June 7, 2015	
International leagues
All-World Baseball Classic Team	1	2017	
World Baseball Classic Pool MVP	1	Pool D, 2017	

Records and Milestones

- 2× 30–30 club (2023, 2025)
- Most career postseason grand slams (2)
- Most seasons with 25 home runs and 25 stolen bases as a shortstop (4)
- Most seasons with 20 home runs and 20 stolen bases as a shortstop (5)

Statistical achievements

Note: Through 2025 season. Per Baseball-Reference.com.

American/National League statistical leader
Category	Times	Dates
Assists at shortstop leader	1	2023
At bats leader	3	2017, 2018, 2025
Double plays turned at shortstop leader	1	2017
Plate appearances leader	4	2017, 2018, 2020, 2025
Putouts at shortstop leader	1	2022
Runs scored leader	1	2018
Sacrifice flies leader	1	2016
Sacrifice hits leader	1	2015

American/National League top-ten ranking
Category	Times	Seasons	Category	Times	Seasons
Adjusted on-base plus slugging	1	2024	Plate appearances	6	2017, 2018, 2020, 2022, 2024, 2025
Assists	5	2016, 2018, 2022, 2023, 2025	Power-speed #	7	2017–19, 2022–25
Assists at shortstop	7	2016–18, 2022–25	Putouts at shortstop	9	2016–20, 2022–25
At bats	7	2017, 2018, 2020, 2022–25	Runs scored	6	2017, 2018, 2022–25
Doubles	5	2017–19, 2024, 2025	Runs batted in	1	2022
Double plays at shortstop	9	2016–20, 2022–25	Sacrifice flies	5	2016, 2019, 2022, 2023, 2025
Extra base hits	5	2017–19, 2024, 2025	Sacrifice hits	2	2015, 2017
Fielding percentage at shortstop	7	2016, 2017, 2019, 2020, 2022–24	Singles	2	2016, 2022
Games played	6	2017, 2018, 2020, 2022, 2023, 2025	Slugging percentage	2	2018, 2024
Hits	6	2016–18, 2022, 2024, 2025	Stolen bases	4	2018, 2019, 2023, 2025
Hit by pitch	2	2024, 2025	Times on base	6	2017, 2018, 2020, 2022, 2024, 2025
Home runs	3	2018, 2024, 2025	Total bases	4	2017, 2018, 2024, 2025
Intentional base on balls	4	2017–20	Triples	1	2022
On-base plus slugging	2	2018, 2024	Wins above replacement	3	2018, 2023, 2024

== See also ==
- Cleveland Indians award winners and league leaders
- New York Mets award winners and league leaders
- List of Major League Baseball annual runs scored leaders
- List of Major League Baseball players from Puerto Rico
- List of Major League Baseball career runs scored leaders

Awards and achievements
Preceded by Didi Gregorius	American League Player of the Month; May 2019	Succeeded by Alex Bregman
