= Marvin Miller Man of the Year Award =

Annual award in Major League Baseball

- Country: United States
- Presented by: Major League Baseball Players Association

History
- First award: 1997
- Most recent: Chris Bassitt, Baltimore Orioles

External image
- Marvin Miller, the namesake of the award

The Marvin Miller Man of the Year Award is given annually to a Major League Baseball (MLB) player "whose on-field performance and contributions to his community inspire others to higher levels of achievement." The award was created by the Major League Baseball Players' Association (MLBPA) and was presented to the inaugural winner – Mark McGwire – in 1997 as the "Man of the Year Award". Three years later, it was renamed in honor of Marvin Miller, the first executive director of the MLBPA. The award forms part of the Players Choice Awards.

In order to determine the winner, each MLB team nominates one of their players, who is selected by their teammates to appear on the ballot. An online vote is conducted among baseball fans in order to reduce the number of candidates to six. MLB players then choose the award winner from among the six finalists. In addition to the award, recipients have $50,000 donated on their behalf to charities of their choice by the MLB Players Trust. John Smoltz, Jim Thome, Michael Young, Curtis Granderson, and Marcus Semien are the only players to win the Marvin Miller Man of the Year Award on multiple occasions. Five winners – Paul Molitor, Jim Thome, Smoltz, Chipper Jones and Mariano Rivera – are members of the National Baseball Hall of Fame.

Winners of the Marvin Miller Man of the Year Award have undertaken a variety of different causes. Many winners, including McGwire, Thome, Smoltz, Mike Sweeney, Torii Hunter, Young, Curtis Granderson and Brandon Inge, worked with children in need. McGwire established a foundation to assist children who were physically or sexually abused, while Inge visited disabled children at the Mott Children's Hospital and donated part of his salary to raise money for a pediatric cancer infusion center. Other winners devoted their work to aiding individuals who had a specific illness, such as Albert Pujols, whose daughter has Down syndrome, and who devoted the Pujols Family Foundation to helping those with the disease, and Jones, who has been raising money for cystic fibrosis since 1996, after meeting an 11-year-old fan who suffered from the disease and who died several weeks after meeting Jones through the Make-A-Wish Foundation.

== Winners ==
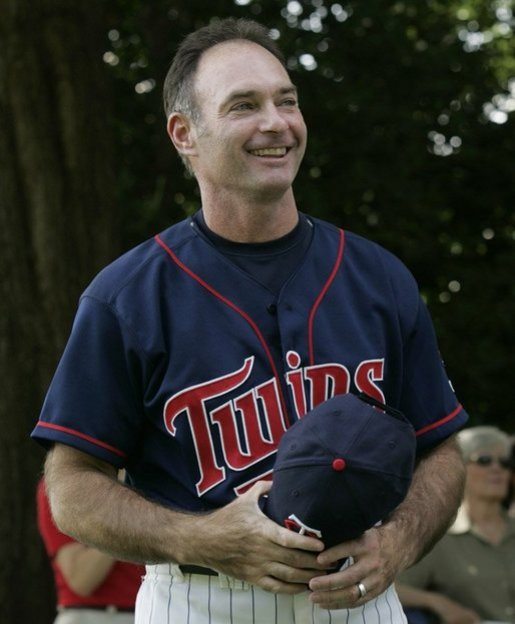
Paul Molitor, the 1998 recipient, is one of five award winners to be inducted into the Baseball Hall of Fame.

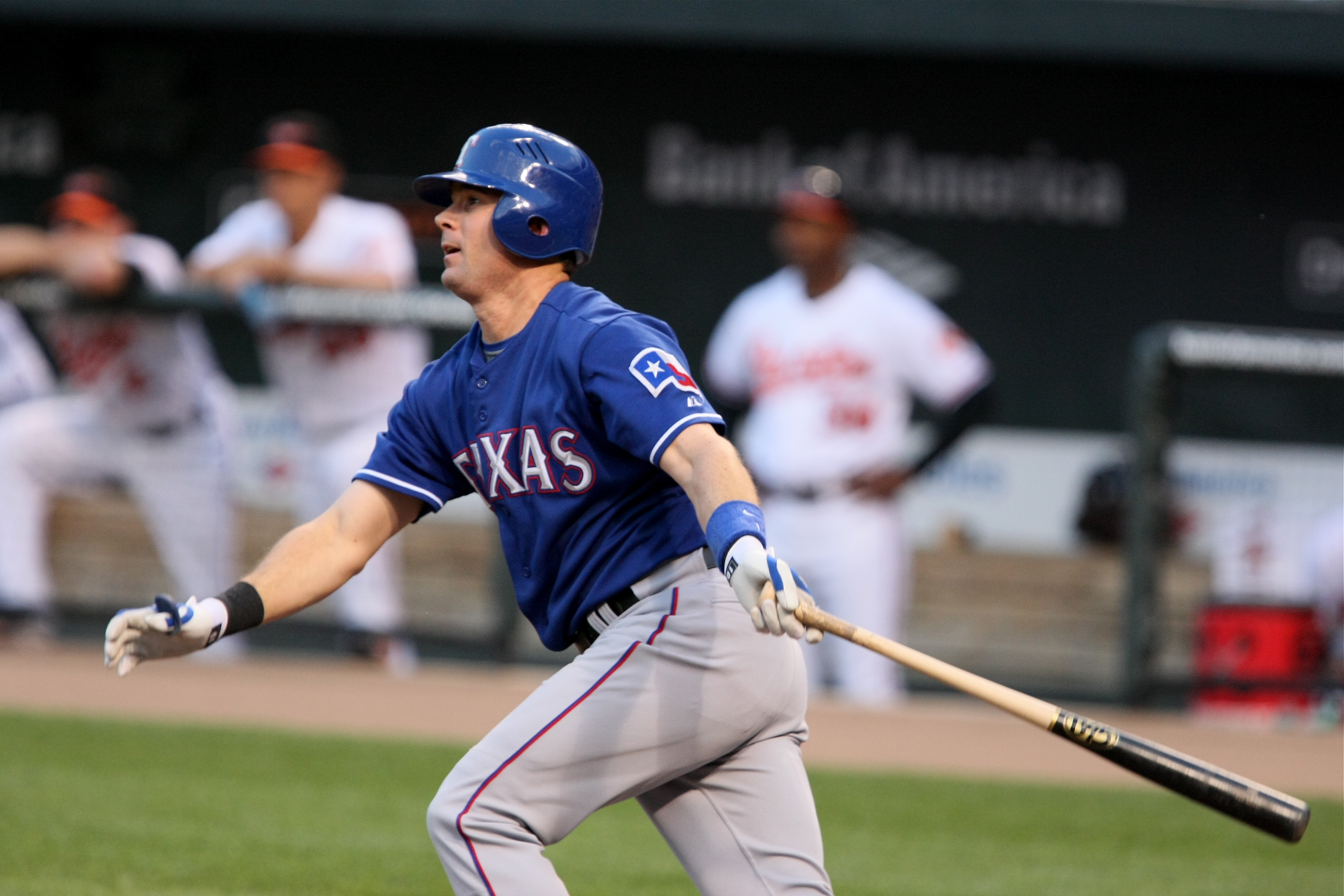
Michael Young is one of five players to win the award on multiple occasions.

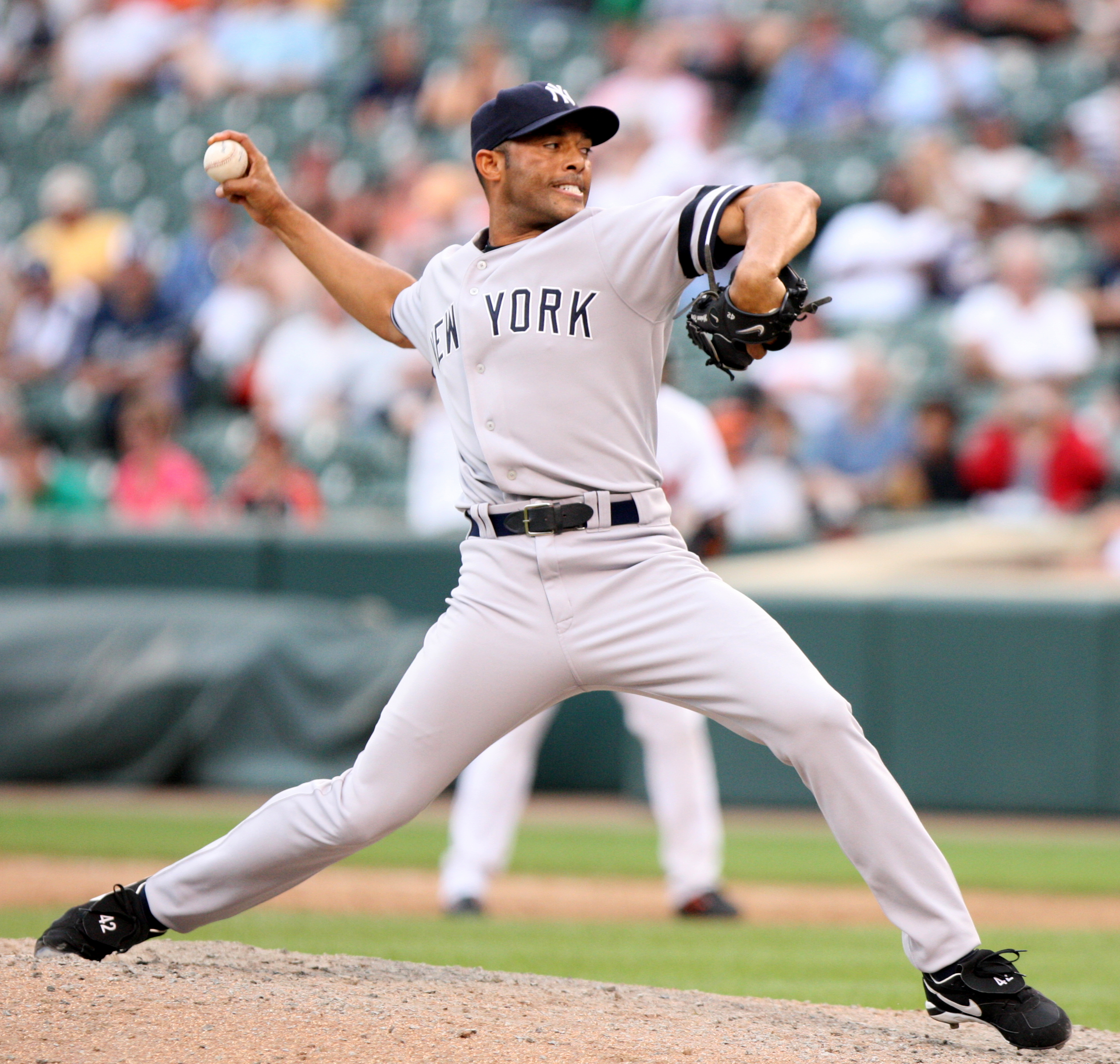
Mariano Rivera won the award in 2013, the final year of his career.

Key
Year	Links to the article about the corresponding Major League Baseball year
Player (X)	Name of the player and number of times they had won the award at that point (if more than one)
Team	The player's team at the time he won the award
Position	The player's position at the time he won the award
†	Member of the Baseball Hall of Fame
‡	Player is active

Winners
Year	Player	Team	Position	Ref
1997	Mark McGwire	Oakland Athletics; St. Louis Cardinals	First baseman	
1998	Paul Molitor^{†}	Minnesota Twins	Designated hitter	
1999	Sammy Sosa	Chicago Cubs	Outfielder	
2000	Eric Davis	St. Louis Cardinals	Outfielder	
2001	Jim Thome^{†}	Cleveland Indians	First baseman	
2002	John Smoltz^{†}	Atlanta Braves	Relief pitcher	
2003	John Smoltz^{†} (2)	Atlanta Braves	Relief pitcher	
2004	Jim Thome^{†} (2)	Philadelphia Phillies	First baseman	
2005	Mike Sweeney	Kansas City Royals	First baseman	
2006	Albert Pujols	St. Louis Cardinals	First baseman	
2007	Torii Hunter	Minnesota Twins	Outfielder	
2008	Michael Young	Texas Rangers	Shortstop	
2009	Curtis Granderson	Detroit Tigers	Outfielder	
2010	Brandon Inge	Detroit Tigers	Third baseman	
2011	Michael Young (2)	Texas Rangers	Infielder (Note: During the 2011 season, Young played 40 games at third base, 36 games at first base, 14 games at second base and one game at shortstop.)	
2012	Chipper Jones^{†}	Atlanta Braves	Third baseman	
2013	Mariano Rivera^{†}	New York Yankees	Relief pitcher	
2014	Clayton Kershaw	Los Angeles Dodgers	Starting pitcher	
2015	Adam Jones	Baltimore Orioles	Outfielder	
2016	Curtis Granderson (2)	New York Mets	Outfielder	
2017	Anthony Rizzo	Chicago Cubs	First baseman	
2018	Curtis Granderson (3)	Toronto Blue Jays; Milwaukee Brewers	Outfielder	
2019	Curtis Granderson (4)	Miami Marlins	Outfielder	
2020	Nelson Cruz	Minnesota Twins	Designated hitter	
2021	Marcus Semien^{‡}	Toronto Blue Jays	Second baseman	
2022	Francisco Lindor^{‡}	New York Mets	Shortstop	
2023	Marcus Semien^{‡} (2)	Texas Rangers	Second baseman	
2024	Rhys Hoskins^{‡}	Milwaukee Brewers	First baseman	
2025	Brent Suter^{‡}	Cincinnati Reds	Relief Pitcher	
2026	Chris Bassitt^{‡}	Baltimore Orioles	Starting pitcher	

== See also ==
- Roberto Clemente Award
- Lou Gehrig Memorial Award
- Branch Rickey Award
- Baseball awards
- List of Major League Baseball awards
