= Roberto Clemente Award =

Baseball award given annually for sportsmanship and excellent community involvement

- Logo for the 2024 Roberto Clemente Award.
- Sport: Baseball
- League: Major League Baseball
- Awarded for: The player that "best represents the game of Baseball through extraordinary character, community involvement, philanthropy and positive contributions, both on and off the field"
- Country: United States, Canada
- Presented by: Major League Baseball

History
- First award: 1971
- Most recent: Francisco Lindor, New York Mets
- Website: MLB.com

The Roberto Clemente Award is given annually to the Major League Baseball (MLB) player who "best represents the game of Baseball through extraordinary character, community involvement, philanthropy and positive contributions, both on and off the field." Originally known as the Commissioner's Award, it has been presented by MLB since 1971, and was renamed in 1973 after Hall of Fame Pittsburgh Pirates outfielder Roberto Clemente following his death in a plane crash while delivering supplies to victims of the Nicaragua earthquake.

Each year, every Major League Baseball team chooses a nominee for the award during the regular season. The player who receives the most votes online via MLB's official website, MLB.com, gets one vote in addition to the votes cast by a panel of sportswriters and baseball dignitaries. The winner is announced before Game 3 of the World Series. Since 2007, the award has been presented by Chevrolet, which donates money and a Chevy vehicle to the recipient's charity of choice. Additional contributions are made by it to the Roberto Clemente Sports City, a non-profit organization in Carolina, Puerto Rico, that provides national sports activities for children, and to the charity of choice of each of the 30 club nominees.

The first recipient of the award was Willie Mays, and the most recent honoree is Francisco Lindor. No player has received the award more than once. The team to have the most winners is the St. Louis Cardinals. Two Pirates, Clemente's former teammate Willie Stargell (1974) and Andrew McCutchen (2015), have received the honor. Pittsburgh has worn Clemente-era throwback uniforms in recent years on Roberto Clemente Day, when they announce their annual Clemente Award nominee. The award has only been shared once, in 2014, by Paul Konerko and Jimmy Rollins. As of 2025, the active MLB teams without a winner are the Colorado Rockies, Los Angeles Angels, Miami Marlins, Texas Rangers, Toronto Blue Jays, and Washington Nationals.

In 2022, Major League Baseball created a circular patch with Clemente's number "21", which may be displayed on the back of any winner's hat and helmet.

== Honorees ==
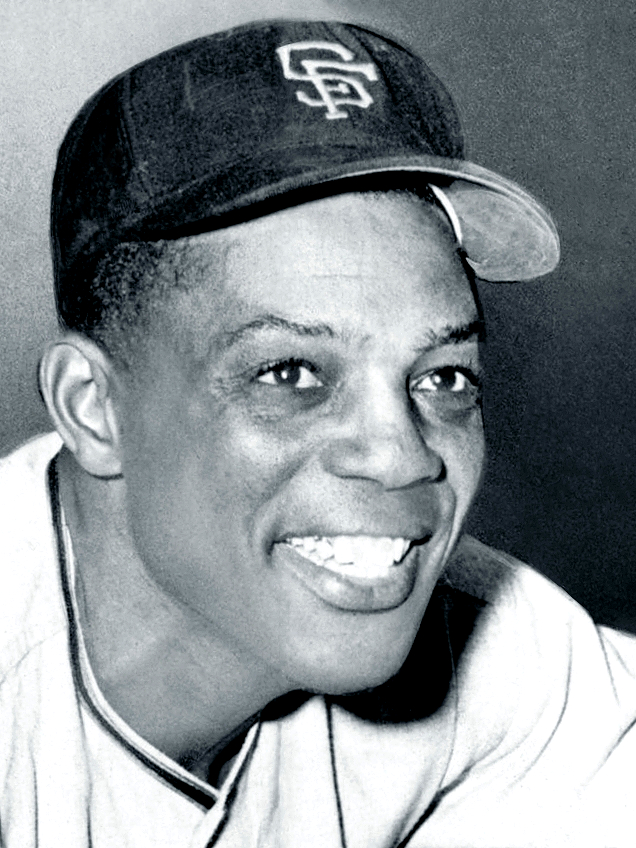
Willie Mays won the first award, in 1971

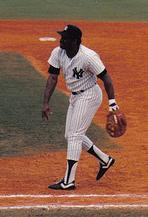
Don Baylor won in 1985

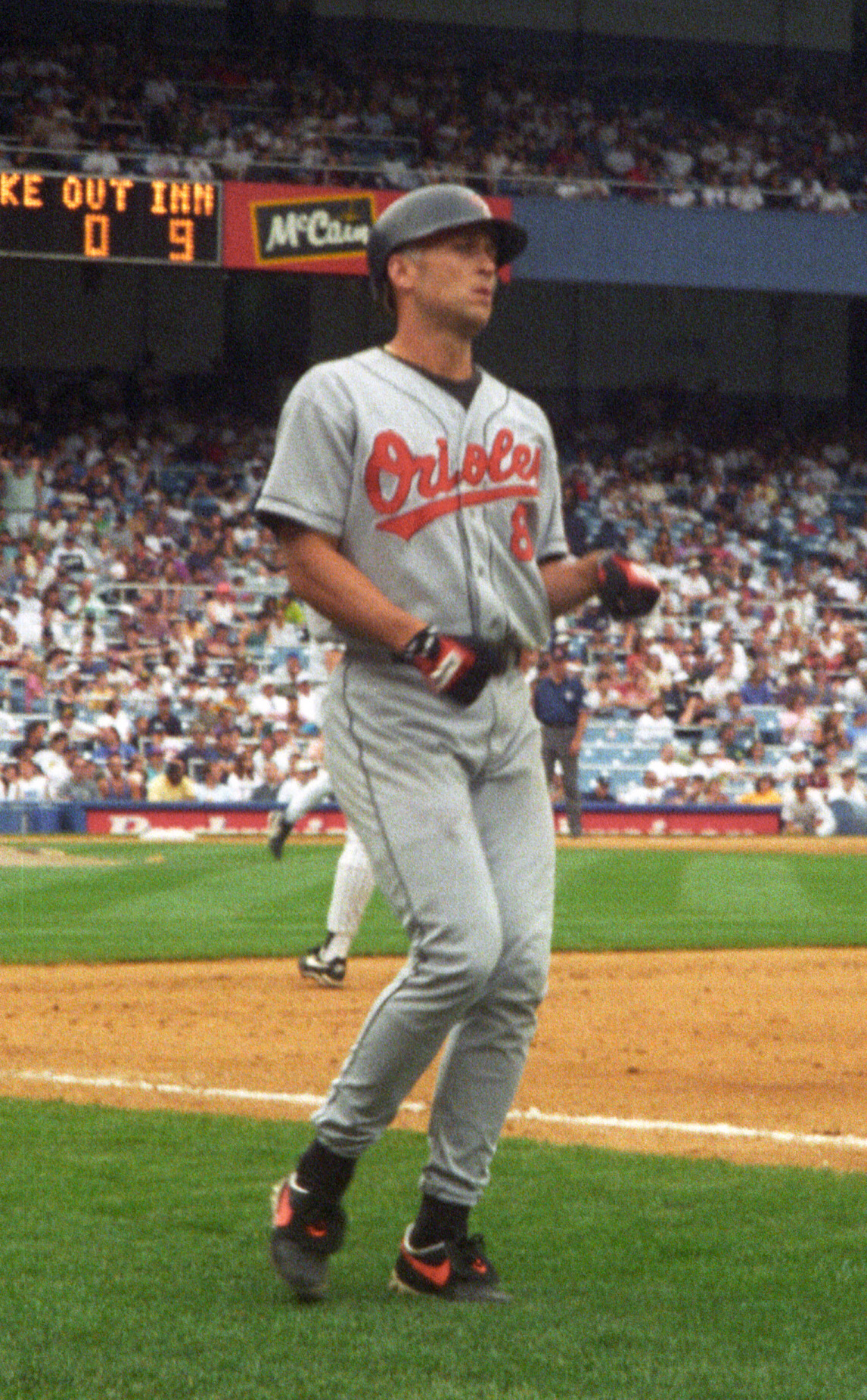
1992 recipient Cal Ripken Jr.

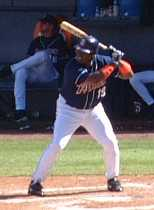
Tony Gwynn was the 1999 recipient

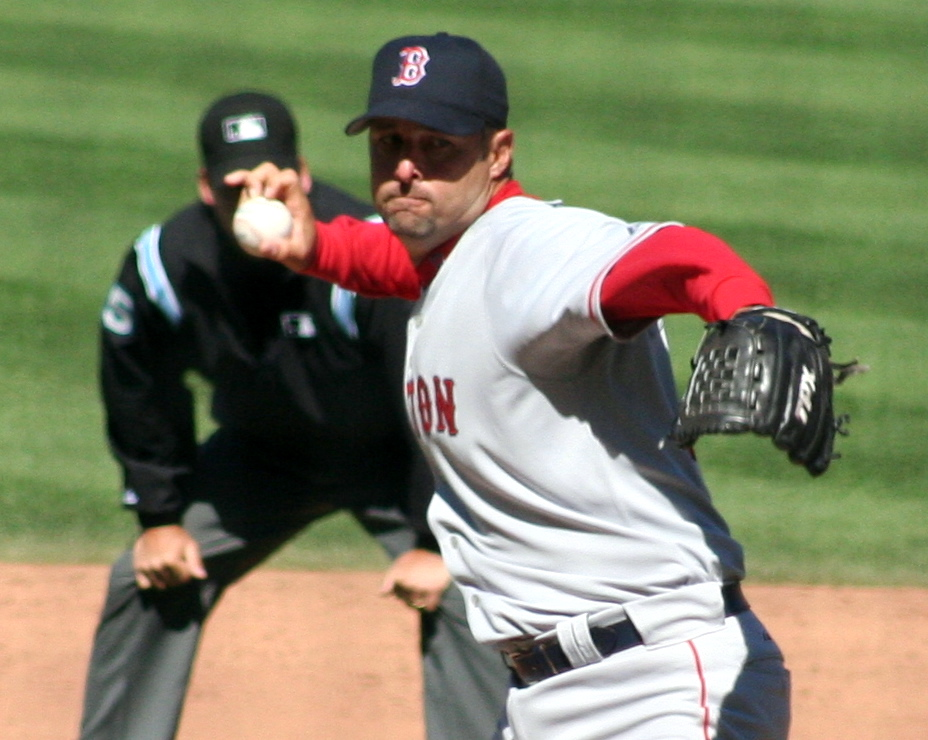
Tim Wakefield won in 2010

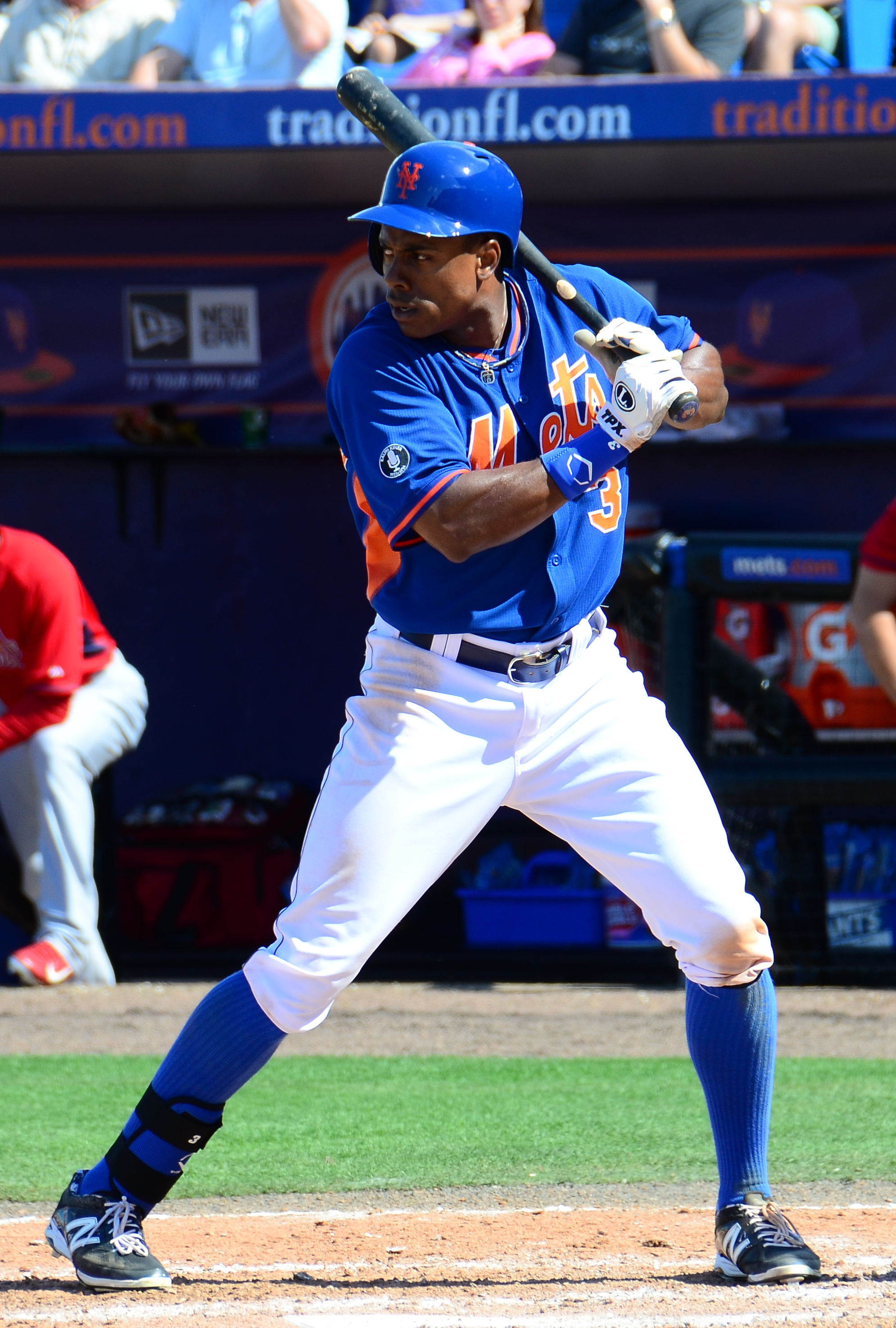
The 2016 award went to Curtis Granderson

Key

| † | Member of the Baseball Hall of Fame |
| ^ | Player is still active |

Recipients by year

| Year | Player | Team | League | Position |
|---|---|---|---|---|
| 1971 | Willie Mays ^{†} | San Francisco Giants | National | Outfielder |
| 1972 | Brooks Robinson ^{†} | Baltimore Orioles | American | Third baseman |
| 1973 | Al Kaline ^{†} | Detroit Tigers | American | Outfielder |
| 1974 | Willie Stargell ^{†} | Pittsburgh Pirates | National | Outfielder |
| 1975 | Lou Brock ^{†} | St. Louis Cardinals | National | Outfielder |
| 1976 | Pete Rose | Cincinnati Reds | National | Third baseman |
| 1977 | Rod Carew ^{†} | Minnesota Twins | American | First baseman |
| 1978 | Greg Luzinski | Philadelphia Phillies | National | Outfielder |
| 1979 | Andre Thornton | Cleveland Indians | American | First baseman |
| 1980 | Phil Niekro ^{†} | Atlanta Braves | National | Pitcher |
| 1981 | Steve Garvey | Los Angeles Dodgers | National | First baseman |
| 1982 | Ken Singleton | Baltimore Orioles | American | Designated hitter |
| 1983 | Cecil Cooper | Milwaukee Brewers | American | First baseman |
| 1984 | Ron Guidry | New York Yankees | American | Pitcher |
| 1985 | Don Baylor | New York Yankees | American | Designated hitter |
| 1986 | Garry Maddox | Philadelphia Phillies | National | Outfielder |
| 1987 | Rick Sutcliffe | Chicago Cubs | National | Pitcher |
| 1988 | Dale Murphy | Atlanta Braves | National | Outfielder |
| 1989 | Gary Carter ^{†} | New York Mets | National | Catcher |
| 1990 | Dave Stewart | Oakland Athletics | American | Pitcher |
| 1991 | Harold Reynolds | Seattle Mariners | American | Second baseman |
| 1992 | Cal Ripken Jr. ^{†} | Baltimore Orioles | American | Shortstop |
| 1993 | Barry Larkin ^{†} | Cincinnati Reds | National | Shortstop |
| 1994 | Dave Winfield ^{†} | Minnesota Twins | American | Designated hitter |
| 1995 | Ozzie Smith ^{†} | St. Louis Cardinals | National | Shortstop |
| 1996 | Kirby Puckett ^{†} | Minnesota Twins | American | Outfielder |
| 1997 | Eric Davis | Baltimore Orioles | American | Outfielder |
| 1998 | Sammy Sosa | Chicago Cubs | National | Outfielder |
| 1999 | Tony Gwynn ^{†} | San Diego Padres | National | Outfielder |
| 2000 | Al Leiter | New York Mets | National | Pitcher |
| 2001 | Curt Schilling | Arizona Diamondbacks | National | Pitcher |
| 2001 | Residents of New York City | For their relief efforts following the September 11 terrorist attacks. | | |
| 2002 | Jim Thome ^{†} | Cleveland Indians | American | First baseman |
| 2003 | Jamie Moyer | Seattle Mariners | American | Pitcher |
| 2004 | Edgar Martínez ^{†} | Seattle Mariners | American | Designated hitter |
| 2005 | John Smoltz ^{†} | Atlanta Braves | National | Pitcher |
| 2006 | Carlos Delgado | New York Mets | National | First baseman |
| 2007 | Craig Biggio ^{†} | Houston Astros | National | Second baseman |
| 2008 | Albert Pujols | St. Louis Cardinals | National | First baseman |
| 2009 | Derek Jeter ^{†} | New York Yankees | American | Shortstop |
| 2010 | Tim Wakefield | Boston Red Sox | American | Pitcher |
| 2011 | David Ortiz ^{†} | Boston Red Sox | American | Designated hitter |
| 2012 | Clayton Kershaw | Los Angeles Dodgers | National | Pitcher |
| 2013 | Carlos Beltrán ^{†} | St. Louis Cardinals | National | Outfielder |
| 2014 (Note: In 2014, there were two recipients of the award, one in each league.) | Paul Konerko | Chicago White Sox | American | First baseman |
| 2014 | Jimmy Rollins | Philadelphia Phillies | National | Shortstop |
| 2015 | Andrew McCutchen^{^} | Pittsburgh Pirates | National | Outfielder |
| 2016 | Curtis Granderson | New York Mets | National | Outfielder |
| 2017 | Anthony Rizzo | Chicago Cubs | National | First baseman |
| 2018 | Yadier Molina | St. Louis Cardinals | National | Catcher |
| 2019 | Carlos Carrasco^{^} | Cleveland Indians | American | Pitcher |
| 2020 | Adam Wainwright | St. Louis Cardinals | National | Pitcher |
| 2021 | Nelson Cruz | Tampa Bay Rays; Minnesota Twins (Note: Cruz was nominated for the award by the Twins, then traded to the Rays shortly after the All-Star break.) | American | Designated hitter |
| 2022 | Justin Turner^{^} | Los Angeles Dodgers | National | Third baseman |
| 2023 | Aaron Judge^{^} | New York Yankees | American | Outfielder |
| 2024 | Salvador Pérez^{^} | Kansas City Royals | American | Catcher |
| 2025 | Mookie Betts^{^} | Los Angeles Dodgers | National | Shortstop |
| 2026 | Francisco Lindor^{^} | New York Mets | National | Shortstop |

== See also ==
- Walter Payton Man of the Year Award
- Marvin Miller Man of the Year Award
- Lou Gehrig Memorial Award
- Branch Rickey Award
- Bart Giamatti Award
- Baseball awards
- Golden Spirit Award (similar Japanese awards)
