= Curtis Granderson =

American baseball player (born 1981)

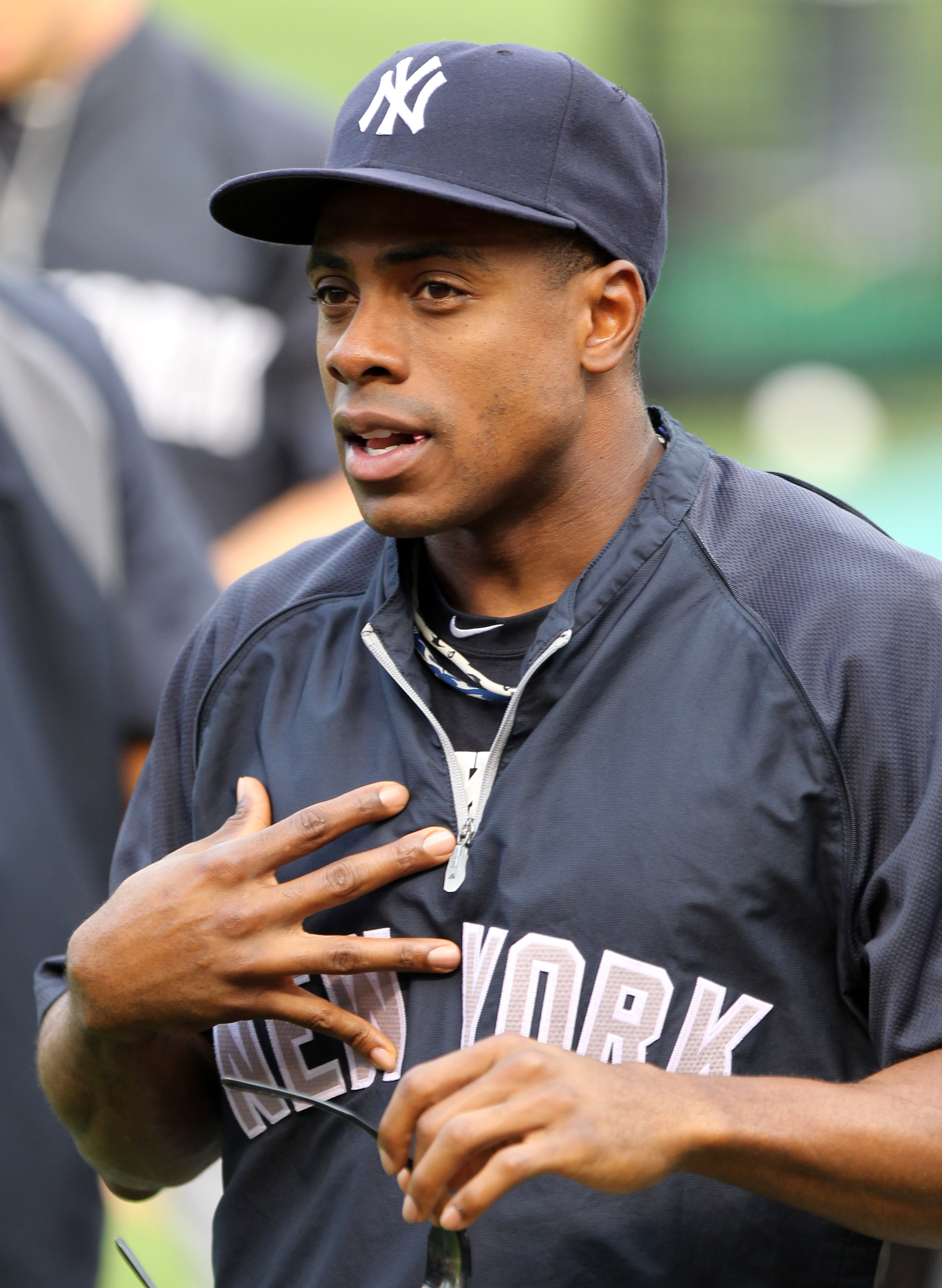
- Granderson with the New York Yankees in 2011
- Outfielder
- Born: March 16, 1981 (age 45); Blue Island, Illinois, U.S.
- Batted: Left Threw: Right

MLB debut
- September 13, 2004, for the Detroit Tigers

Last MLB appearance
- September 29, 2019, for the Miami Marlins

MLB statistics
- Batting average: .249
- Home runs: 344
- Runs batted in: 937
- Stats at Baseball Reference

Teams
- Detroit Tigers (2004–2009); New York Yankees (2010–2013); New York Mets (2014–2017); Los Angeles Dodgers (2017); Toronto Blue Jays (2018); Milwaukee Brewers (2018); Miami Marlins (2019)

Career highlights and awards
- 3× All-Star (2009, 2011, 2012); Silver Slugger Award (2011); Roberto Clemente Award (2016); AL RBI leader (2011)

Curtis Granderson Jr. (born March 16, 1981), nicknamed "the Grandyman", is an American former professional baseball outfielder. He played 16 seasons in Major League Baseball (MLB) for the Detroit Tigers, New York Yankees, New York Mets, Los Angeles Dodgers, Toronto Blue Jays, Milwaukee Brewers, and Miami Marlins.

Granderson played college baseball at the University of Illinois Chicago. He was selected by the Tigers in the 2002 MLB draft. He made his MLB debut with the Tigers in 2004. Granderson is a three-time MLB All-Star and won a Silver Slugger Award in 2011. He retired after the 2019 season.

Off the field, Granderson is recognized for his commitment to the community through outreach and charity work. Many of his charitable endeavors support inner-city children. He has also served as an ambassador for MLB abroad. Granderson won the Marvin Miller Man of the Year Award four times and the Roberto Clemente Award in 2016 in recognition of his contributions in the community.

== Early years ==
Granderson grew up in Blue Island, Illinois, and Lynwood, Illinois, south suburbs of Chicago. His father, Curtis Sr., was a dean and physical education teacher at Nathan Hale Elementary School in Illinois. His mother, Mary, taught chemistry at Curie Metropolitan High School in Chicago. Granderson's half-sister is an English professor at Jackson State University.

As a child, Granderson grew up a fan of the Atlanta Braves of Major League Baseball (MLB), choosing not to root for the hometown Chicago Cubs because he often rushed home from school to watch Saved by the Bell and was disappointed when a Cubs game was on instead. Granderson attended Thornton Fractional South High School (T.F. South) in Lansing, Illinois, where he played baseball and basketball. He batted .369 with 11 home runs and 88 runs batted in (RBIs) in high school and was named an All-State selection his senior year. Granderson wore uniform number 14 at T.F. South, choosing it because his father wore it while playing softball. T.F. South honored Granderson by retiring his jersey in a December 2011 ceremony.

== College career ==
Granderson was recruited by a number of college baseball programs, and he chose the University of Illinois Chicago (UIC), in part because they allowed him to play both baseball and basketball . However, Granderson quit basketball two weeks into his freshman year to concentrate on baseball. As a freshman in 2000, Granderson led the UIC Flames with seven home runs and 45 walks. He followed that by hitting .304 as a sophomore, leading the team in runs, home runs, and walks. After his sophomore year, Granderson played in a summer collegiate league for the Mankato Mashers of the Northwoods League, where he batted .328 in 44 games, with eight doubles, two triples, one home run, 17 RBIs, 28 runs scored, and 15 stolen bases. He wore the number 28, which Mankato retired on May 29, 2023.

During his junior season at UIC, Granderson batted .483, second in the nation to Rickie Weeks Jr. Granderson was named Second-Team All-American by Baseball America and USA Today's Baseball Weekly and a Third-Team Louisville Slugger NCAA Division I All-American. He graduated from UIC with a double major in business administration and business marketing. On February 6, 2013, UIC retired Granderson's number 28.

== Professional career ==
=== Detroit Tigers ===
==== Minor leagues ====
The Detroit Tigers selected Granderson in the third round of the 2002 MLB draft. The Tigers assigned Granderson to the Oneonta Tigers, their Minor League Baseball affiliate in the Class A-Short Season New York-Penn League. With Oneonta, Granderson batted .344 in 52 games. Determined to complete his college education, though the fall semester began before the minor league season ended, Granderson made arrangements to begin his senior year at UIC via internet courses.

The Tigers assigned Granderson to the Lakeland Tigers of the Class A-Advanced Florida State League in 2003 and the Erie SeaWolves of the Double-A Eastern League in 2004. With the SeaWolves, Granderson hit .303 with 21 home runs and 93 RBIs. Baseball America named Granderson the Tigers' minor league player of the year and top prospect after the 2004 season. Prior to the 2005 season, Baseball America rated Granderson as the 57th best prospect in baseball. Granderson competed for the role as the Tigers' starting center fielder in 2005 spring training, but the organization decided he needed more seasoning and assigned him to the Toledo Mud Hens of the Triple-A International League. With Toledo, he hit .290 with 15 home runs, 65 RBIs and 22 stolen bases.

==== Major leagues: 2004–2006 ====
The Tigers promoted Granderson to MLB for the first time in September 2004. He made his MLB debut on September 13 against the Minnesota Twins, going hitless but threw out a baserunner from the outfield. He received his second promotion to the majors in July 2005, playing in six games. After his third promotion to MLB that August, he remained in the majors permanently. Granderson hit his first MLB inside-the-park home run on September 15, had a five-hit game September 18, and hit a walk-off home run on September 26 against the Chicago White Sox.

Granderson became the Tigers starting center fielder for the 2006 season after beating out Nook Logan for the position during spring training. From the start of his major league career in 2004, Granderson began a 151-game errorless streak, the longest by a position player to start his career since Dave Roberts went errorless in 205 games. Granderson hit two home runs during the American League (AL) Division Series and one in the AL Championship Series, but struggled in the World Series, batting .095, as the Cardinals defeated the Tigers.

==== 2007 season ====
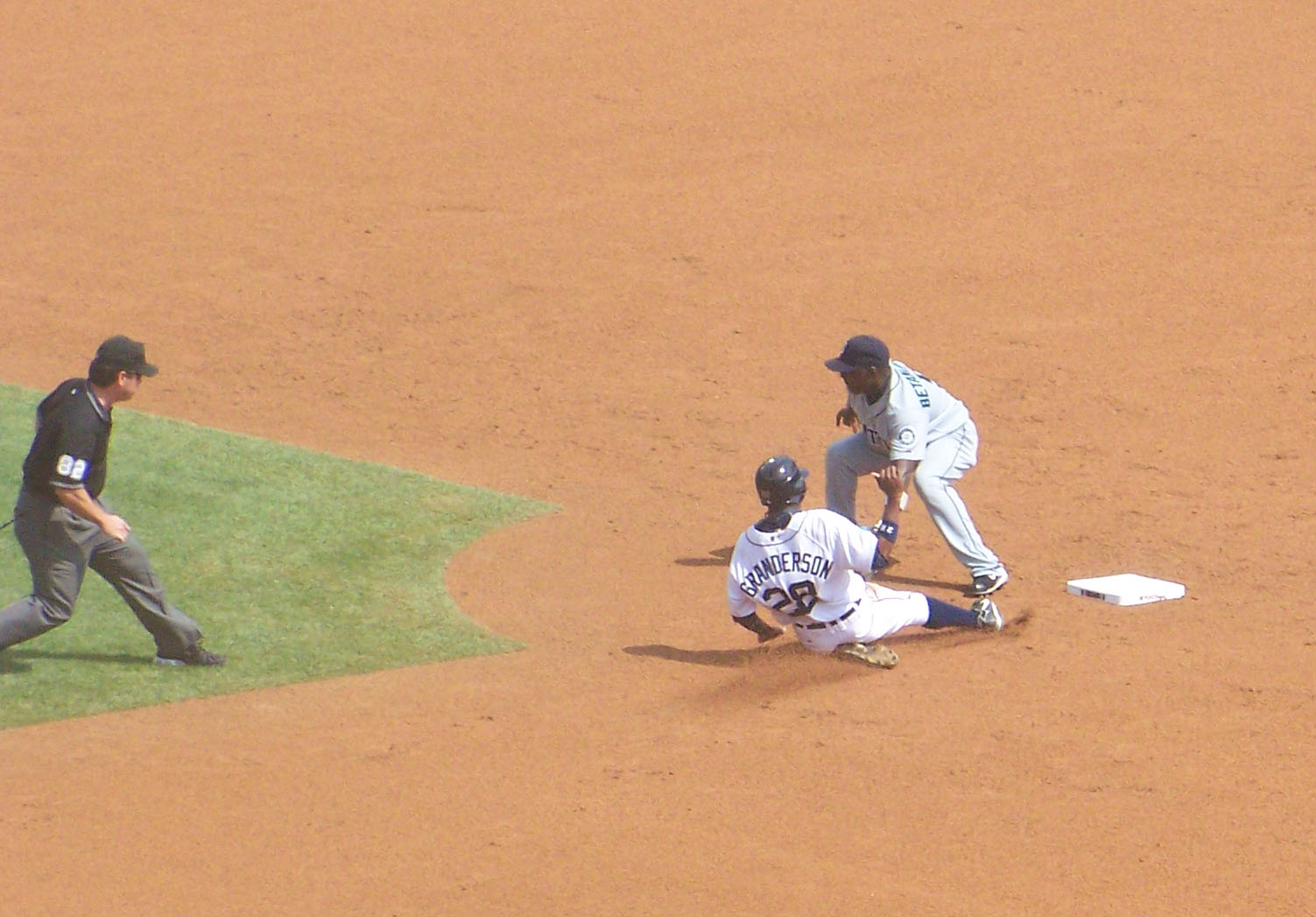
Granderson (center) steals his 20th base with the Tigers in 2007

Through June, Granderson ranked first among AL outfielders in triples (14), third in doubles (22), tied for fourth in runs (58) and tied for 10th in homers (11) with a .289 batting average in the 2007 season. Although Granderson was not listed on the All-Star Game ballot, due to the Tigers' decision to put Gary Sheffield as an outfielder on the ballot, he still received 376,033 write-in votes, the most write-in votes for any player. Granderson was named the AL Player of the Week on July 16, the first time he had won the award, as he hit .500 (8 for 16) with two doubles, a triple, and a home run during that week. Granderson slugged .938, drove in two runs, scored seven runs, and had fifteen total bases during Detroit's four-game series against the Seattle Mariners.

On August 7, Granderson became the second player in franchise history to have at least 30 doubles, 15 triples, 15 home runs, and ten stolen bases in a single season when he hit a double in a game against the Tampa Bay Devil Rays. The other Tiger to accomplish this feat was Charlie Gehringer in 1930. He became the sixth member of baseball's 20–20–20 club on September 7, joining the Kansas City Royals' George Brett (1979), Willie Mays of the New York Giants (1957), Cleveland's Jeff Heath (1941), St. Louis' Jim Bottomley (1928), and Frank Schulte of the Chicago Cubs (1911). Granderson stole his 20th base of the season on September 9, joining Mays and Schulte as the only players in major league history to reach 20 doubles, 20 triples, 20 home runs, and 20 stolen bases in a season, a feat accomplished by the Philadelphia Phillies' Jimmy Rollins 21 days later.

Granderson hit .302 with 23 home runs for the season, and was 26 for 27 in stolen base attempts. He also improved his plate discipline, as he finished seventh in the AL in strikeouts with 141. He was one of six AL players to have at least 20 home runs and 20 stolen bases, along with teammate Gary Sheffield, Ian Kinsler, Alex Rodriguez, Grady Sizemore, and B. J. Upton.

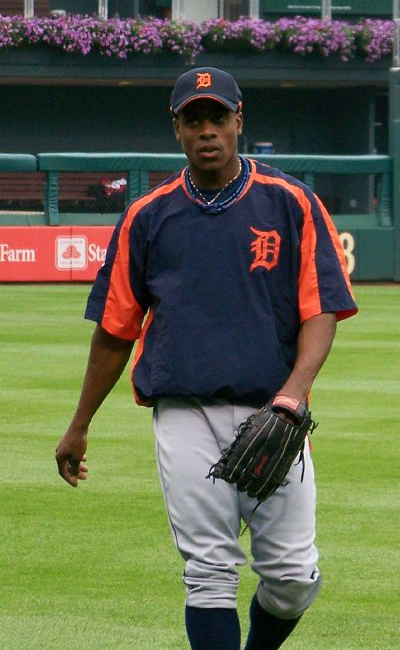
Granderson with the Tigers in 2007

During the 2007 season, Granderson hit 23 triples, which led all of baseball. The Tigers and AL single-season record is 26 triples, achieved by Sam Crawford, the all-time triples king, in 1914. Granderson was the first player since 1949 with at least 23 in a season. Granderson hit only ten triples at home despite the fact Comerica Park allowed far more triples than most MLB ballparks. Granderson's 23 triples matched or exceeded six entire teams' triples in 2007: the Chicago White Sox, Cincinnati Reds, Los Angeles Angels of Anaheim, Oakland Athletics, Seattle Mariners and St. Louis Cardinals.

==== 2008–2009 ====
In February 2008, Granderson signed a five-year, $30.25 million contract extension with the Tigers that included a club option for 2013. Granderson continued hitting well in 2008, finishing with a .280 batting average, 13 triples and 22 home runs. He continued to improve his plate discipline, striking out only 111 times (versus 141 in 2007 and 174 in 2006) and drawing a career-high 71 walks. During August, he hit six triples, including two in consecutive innings during a game against the Texas Rangers.

With the Tigers failing to make the playoffs in 2007 and 2008, TBS employed Granderson as a commentator alongside Cal Ripken Jr., Dennis Eckersley and Frank Thomas for its coverage of the 2007 and 2008 postseasons.

Granderson was selected to the 2009 MLB All-Star Game, his first All-Star appearance. In the game, he hit a triple in the top of the eighth inning and scored the winning run.

=== New York Yankees ===
==== 2010 and 2011 seasons ====
After the 2009 season, the Tigers began shopping Granderson to other teams in an effort to reduce their payroll. The Yankees acquired Granderson in a three-team trade on December 9. In the deal, the Yankees received Granderson while sending Phil Coke and centerfielder Austin Jackson to Detroit. Also, the Arizona Diamondbacks received Yankees pitcher Ian Kennedy and Tigers pitcher Edwin Jackson in return for young pitchers Max Scherzer and Daniel Schlereth, who joined the Tigers.

Granderson hit a home run in his first Yankee at bat on April 4, 2010, becoming the 12th player to do so. Although he missed some games due to a strained groin, Granderson finished the season with 136 games played, a .247 batting average, and 24 home runs. Granderson, who struggled against left-handed pitching throughout his career, also put up subpar numbers against right-handed pitchers, causing Granderson to revamp his swing with the help of hitting coach Kevin Long in August 2010.

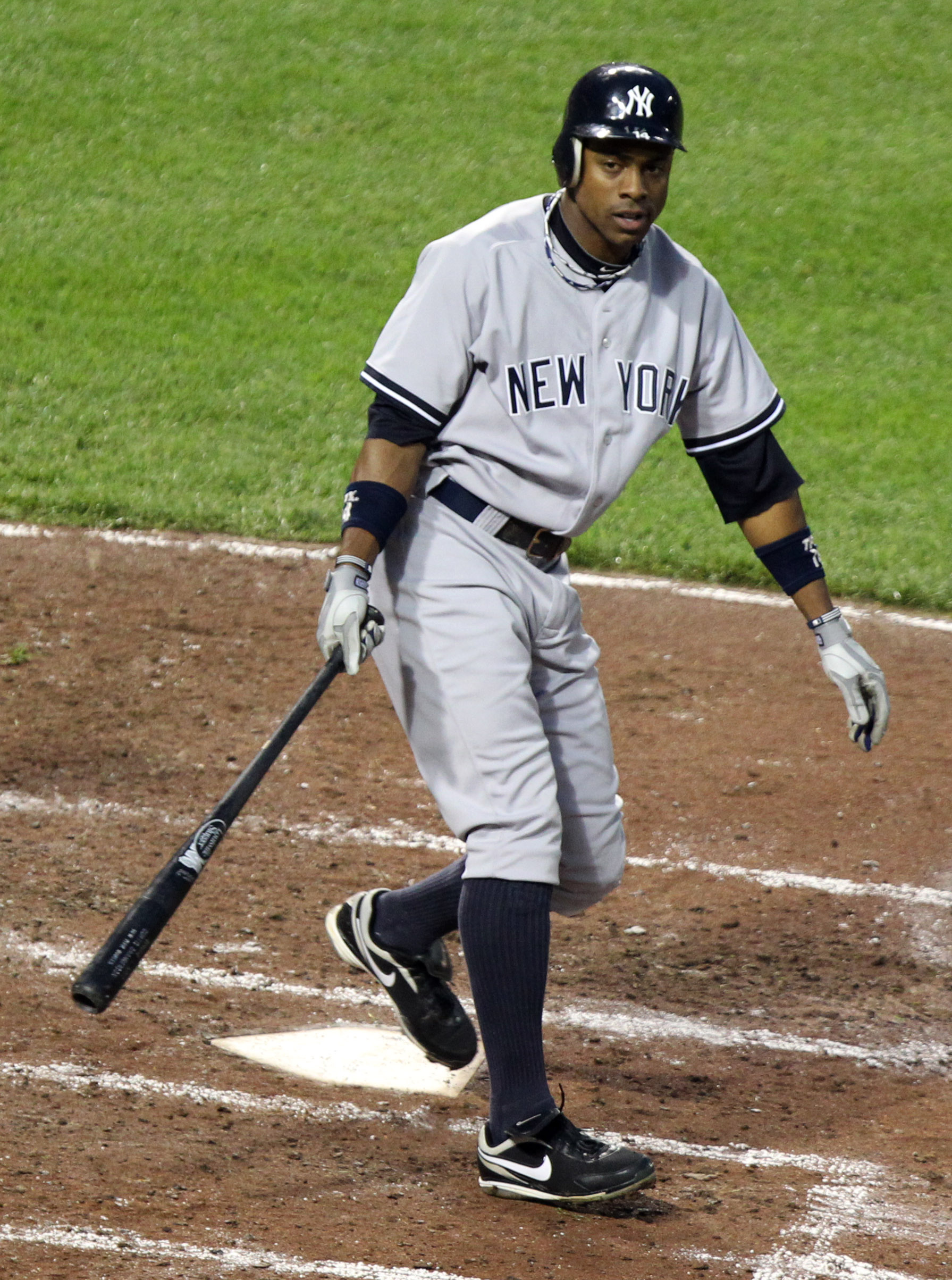
Granderson with the Yankees in 2011.

Granderson's work with Long was credited as a reason for his strong 2011 campaign. Granderson received over 6.6 million votes for the All-Star Game. In August, Granderson and Mark Teixeira became the first Yankees teammates to hit 30 home runs in 115 games since Roger Maris and Mickey Mantle in 1961. On August 10, Granderson hit two home runs against the Los Angeles Angels of Anaheim to tally a career-high 31 home runs. Granderson, Robinson Canó, and Russell Martin all hit grand slams in a game against the Athletics on August 25, the first time a team had three grand slams in one game. Granderson was named AL Player of the Month for August 2011, in which he batted .286, with a .423 on-base percentage, slugged .657, hit ten home runs, recorded 29 RBIs, and scored 29 runs, and had the highest number of pitches per plate appearance in the major leagues (4.44).

In 2011, Granderson hit 41 home runs with 25 stolen bases and an AL-leading 119 RBIs. He became the first player in MLB history to record 40 home runs, 10 triples and 25 stolen bases in one season. Granderson finished fourth in balloting for the AL Most Valuable Player Award.

==== 2012 and 2013 seasons ====
On May 6, 2012, Granderson achieved his 1,000th hit against Kansas City. On August 26, he hit his 200th career home run against the Cleveland Indians. He finished the 2012 season with a .232 batting average, 43 home runs, 106 RBIs, and set a new Yankees season record by striking out 195 times.

On October 19, 2012, the Yankees exercised Granderson's club option for the 2013 season. Originally worth $13 million, it became a $15 million option after he placed fourth in the MVP voting in 2011. In his spring training debut against the Toronto Blue Jays on February 24, 2013, Granderson was hit by a pitch from J. A. Happ that fractured his right forearm. He was placed on the 15-day disabled list to begin the season. He returned to the Yankees on May 14. On May 18, Granderson made his first start at right field. On May 24, Granderson broke a knuckle on his left pinkie finger after getting hit by Tampa Bay's Cesar Ramos's pitch in the 5th inning. He was again placed on the 15-day disabled list. On May 29, Granderson underwent surgery in which a pin was inserted to the knuckle to stabilize the fracture. On August 2, Granderson was activated from the disabled list. Granderson was limited to only 61 games in 2013 batting .229 with 7 home runs and 15 RBIs. He became a free agent for the first time of his career after the season.

=== New York Mets ===
==== 2014 and 2015 seasons ====
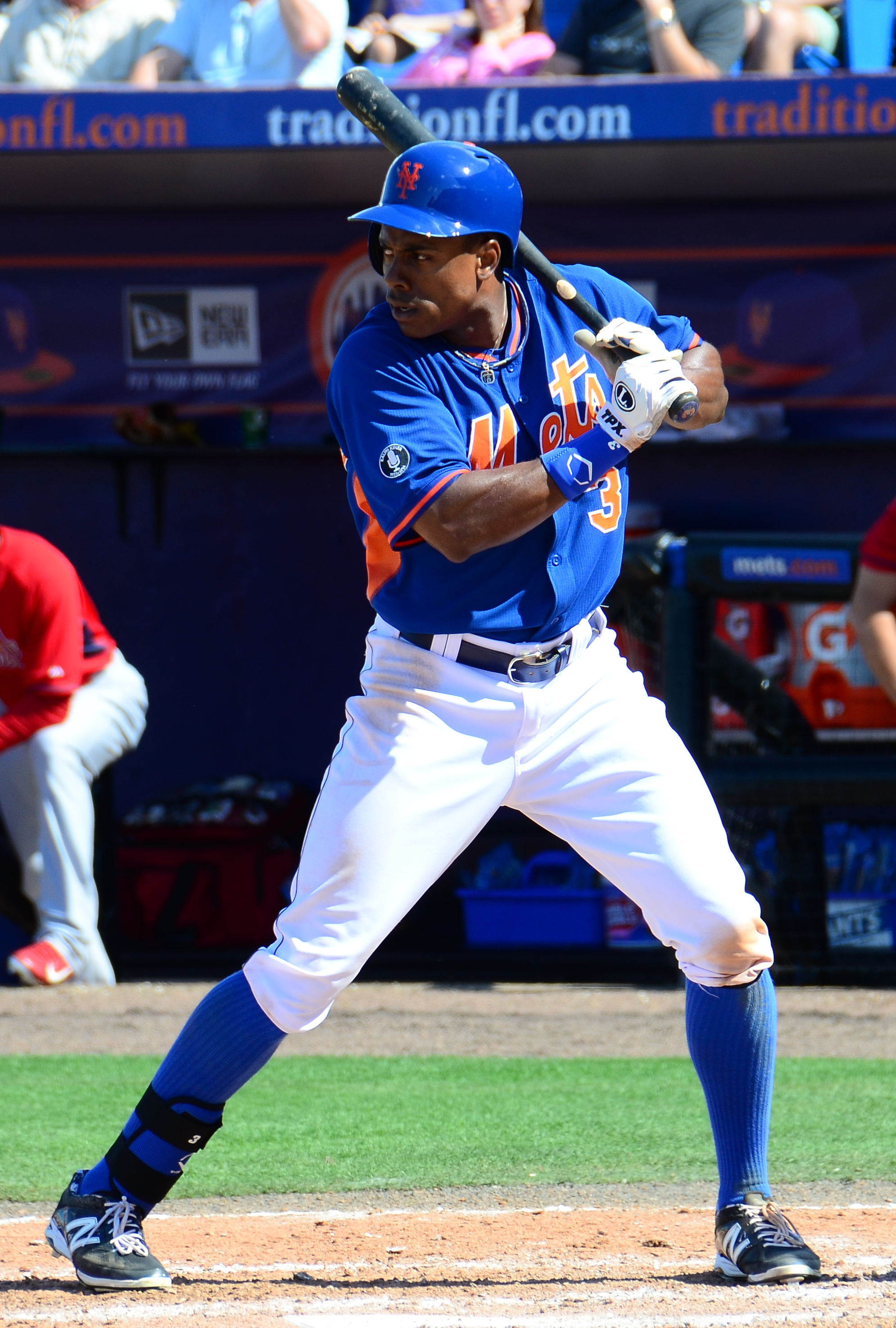
Granderson batting for the Mets in 2014

Granderson agreed to terms with the New York Mets on a four-year contract worth $60 million on December 6, 2013. Granderson's salaries were set at $13 million in 2014, $16 million in 2015 and 2016, and $15 million in 2017. On May 12, Granderson returned to Yankee Stadium for the first time since he signed with the Mets, and went 2-for-5 with a home run. The Mets played Granderson as their right fielder. He started 148 games with 130 in right field. He batted .227 and had the highest number of pitches per plate appearance in the major leagues (4.37). Granderson played in a total of 205 games between May 15, 2013, and September 16, 2014, during which he did not ground into a double play, a record which still stands as of 2020.

In 2015, Granderson became the team's primary leadoff hitter. He went on to lead the team in games played, runs scored, hits, stolen bases, walks, on-base percentage and total bases en route to a National League (NL) East division title. In the Game 3 of the NL Division Series (NLDS), Granderson picked up five RBI – this tied a Mets single game postseason record previously set by Carlos Delgado in the 2006 National League Championship Series (NLCS), Edgardo Alfonzo in the 1999 NLCS, and Rusty Staub in the 1973 World Series. After beating the Los Angeles Dodgers in five games in the NLDS, the Mets went on to sweep the Chicago Cubs in four games in the NLCS.

Granderson hit three home runs and five RBIs in the World Series. In Game 1, after the Royals tied the game in the ninth inning with a home run off Mets closer Jeurys Familia, Granderson made an excellent leaping catch with no outs in the bottom of the 11th inning, off the bat of the Royals fastest runner Jarrod Dyson, preventing what would have at least been a lead off triple and likely saving the game at the time.

==== 2016 and 2017 seasons ====
On May 27, 2016, Granderson hit a walk-off home run against the Los Angeles Dodgers. He was the first batter up in the bottom of the 9th inning. By June 16, Granderson had hit 17 leadoff homers since joining the Mets in 2014, a franchise record. On September 17, Granderson hit two solo home runs against the Minnesota Twins at Citi Field. The first tied the ballgame in the bottom of the 11th inning and the second won the game in the bottom of the 12th inning. He became only the eighth player in major league history to hit multiple home runs in extra innings of the same game. In the NL Wild Card Game against the San Francisco Giants on October 5, Granderson ranged 102 feet (31 m) to make a run-saving catch while crashing into the outfield wall.

On June 14, 2017, Granderson hit his 300th career home run in a win over the Chicago Cubs. He batted .228 with the Mets in 2017. He had the highest number of pitches per plate appearance in the major leagues (4.52).

=== Later career ===
==== Los Angeles Dodgers and Toronto Blue Jays ====
On August 18, 2017, the Mets traded Granderson to the Los Angeles Dodgers for a player to be named later. Two days later, the Dodgers sent Jacob Rhame to the Mets to complete the trade. Granderson hit his first home run for the Dodgers on August 20 against Justin Verlander of the Tigers. After hitting a grand slam home run in his last at-bat for the Mets on August 17, he hit one for the Dodgers on August 21, becoming the first player in MLB history to hit grand slams for two different teams within the same week. The next day, he stole his 150th career base, becoming the 36th player in MLB history with over 300 home runs and 150 or more steals.

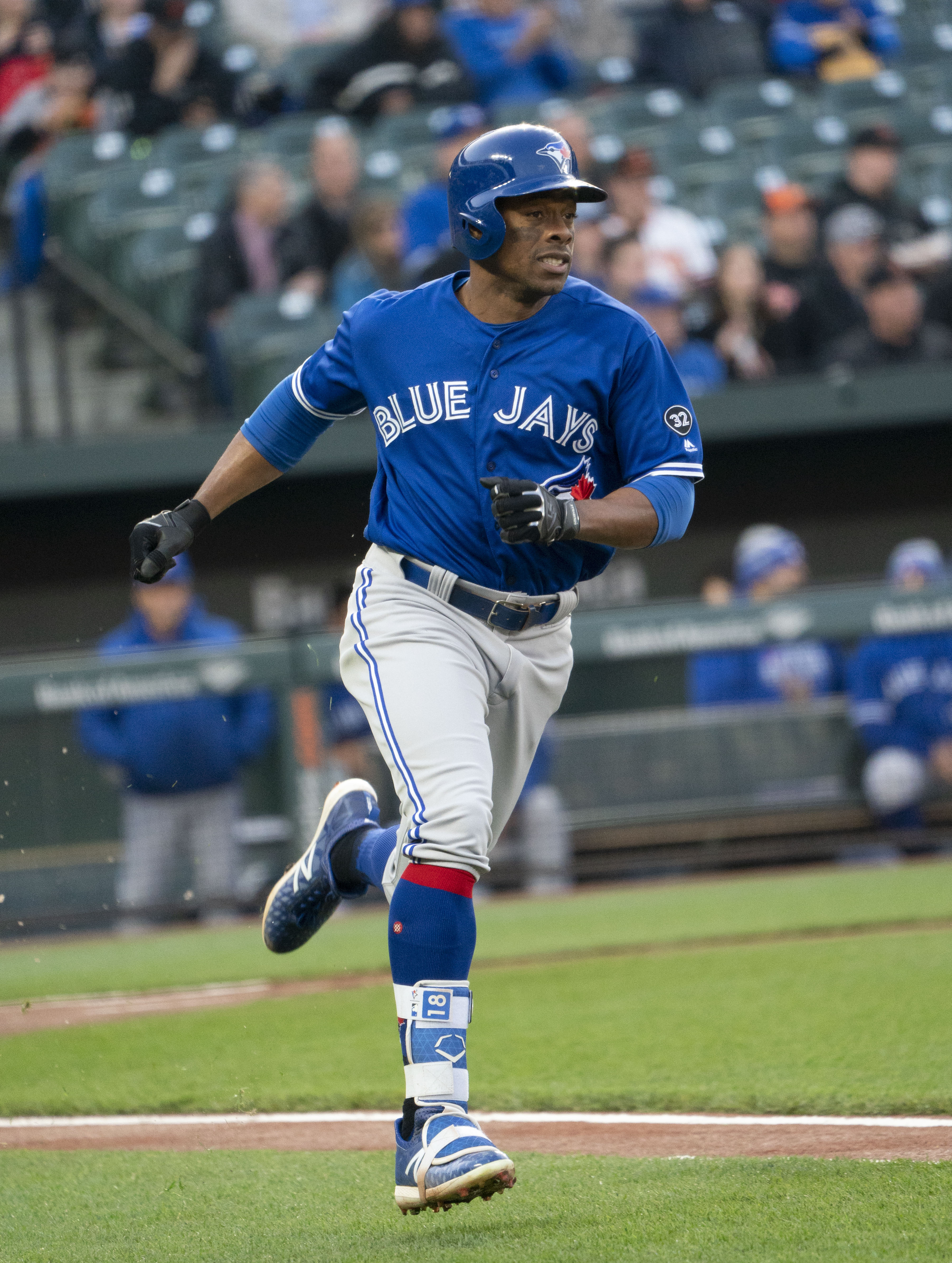
Granderson with the Toronto Blue Jays in 2018

Granderson batted .161/.288/.366 for the Dodgers, in 112 at bats. He was 1-for-15 with eight strikeouts in the first two rounds of the 2017 MLB postseason, and the Dodgers left him off the World Series roster.

On January 23, 2018, Granderson signed a one-year, $5 million contract with the Toronto Blue Jays. On June 10, against the Baltimore Orioles, Granderson hit for a career high six RBIs with a home run, two doubles, a single and a walk. On June 25, while playing the Houston Astros, Granderson hit two home runs off of Justin Verlander to lead the Blue Jays to victory.

==== Milwaukee Brewers and Miami Marlins ====
On August 31, 2018, the Blue Jays traded Granderson to the Milwaukee Brewers for Demi Orimoloye. He batted .220 with two home runs in 19 games for the Brewers. Granderson hit an RBI double against the Los Angeles Dodgers in Game 5 of the NLCS, which the Brewers lost.

On February 5, 2019, Granderson signed a minor league contract with the Miami Marlins that included an invitation to spring training and provided him with a $1.75 million salary if he made the major league roster. The Marlins included Granderson on their roster as a leadoff hitter when facing right-handed pitchers.

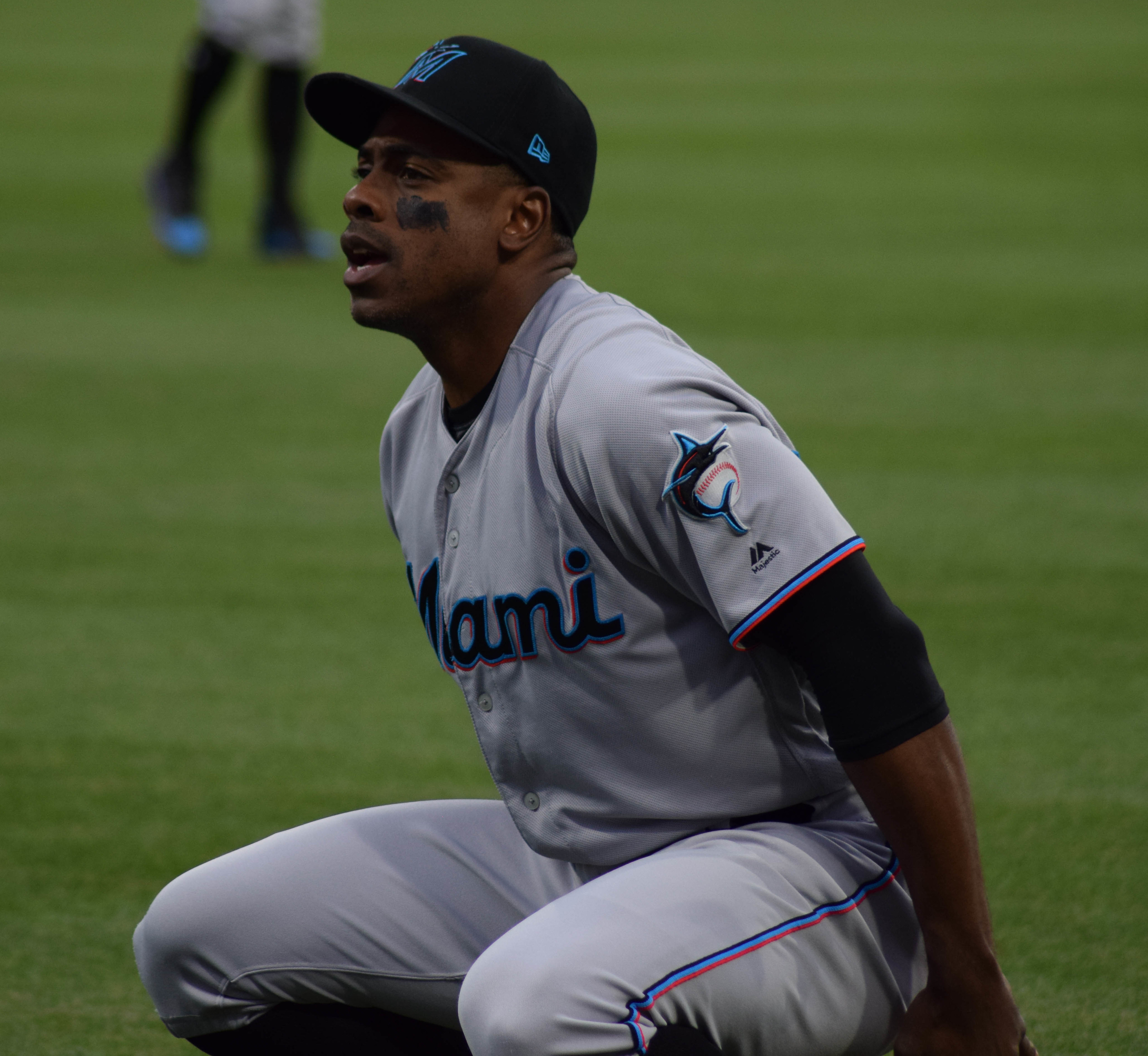
Granderson with the Marlins

For the 2019 season, Granderson batted .183/.281/.356 in 363 plate appearances, with his on base percentage and slugging percentages both career lows. He was the sixth-oldest player in the National League.

=== Retirement and post-playing career ===
Towards the end of the 2019 season, Granderson said that he wanted to play again in 2020. Granderson announced his retirement from baseball on January 31, 2020.

Granderson has served as the board chair of the Players Alliance, an organization of active and former major league players that works to increase opportunities for black athletes to participate in professional baseball, since its foundation in 2020. He joined the studio show for MLB on TBS in 2020.

== Personal life ==
Granderson is a fan of WWE, and attended WrestleMania 23 in Detroit. He considers the Ultimate Warrior, the Undertaker, Junkyard Dog and "Macho Man" Randy Savage to be his favorite wrestlers. He is also an avid fan of college basketball and of the Kansas Jayhawks.

Granderson has served as an ambassador for Major League Baseball International. He has traveled to England, Italy, the Netherlands, France, South Africa, China, New Zealand, South Korea and Japan to promote baseball. In appreciation for his efforts, Commissioner Bud Selig penned a thank you letter to Granderson which read in part, "There are so many fine young men playing Major League baseball today, but I can think of no one who is better suited to represent our national pastime than you." He has also promoted and assisted African-American baseball players, often participating in and initiating dialogue about the lack of Black players at all levels of the sport. When he signed endorsement deals with Nike, Louisville Slugger, and Rawlings, he asked them to donate money to his foundation or equipment to inner-city baseball programs rather than pay him.

Granderson's foundation, the Grand Kids Foundation, has raised money to benefit the educations of inner-city children around the country. He wrote a children's book, All You Can Be: Dream It, Draw It, Become It!, published in August 2009. The book is illustrated by students of the New York City public school system. In February 2010, Granderson represented MLB at a White House function announcing Let's Move!, a childhood anti-obesity effort sponsored by First Lady Michelle Obama. Granderson donated $5 million to help UIC build a new baseball stadium in 2013.

Granderson has been involved in the Major League Baseball Players Association (MLBPA) since 2006. He has taken part in negotiations of MLBPA labor contracts. Granderson won the 2009 Marvin Miller Man of the Year Award by the MLBPA for his off-field work, an award he won again in 2016, 2018, and 2019.

In 2011, a poll conducted by Sports Illustrated of 290 players voted Granderson one of the friendliest players in the major leagues. During his playing career, Granderson wore his socks high to honor players from the Negro leagues.

== Publications ==
- Granderson, Curtis (2009). All You Can Be: Dream It, Draw It, Become It!. Triumph Books. ISBN 978-1-60078-247-3.

== See also ==
- 20–20–20 club
- List of Major League Baseball annual triples leaders
- List of Major League Baseball career home run leaders
- List of Major League Baseball career runs scored leaders
