= Zack Greinke =

American baseball player (born 1983)

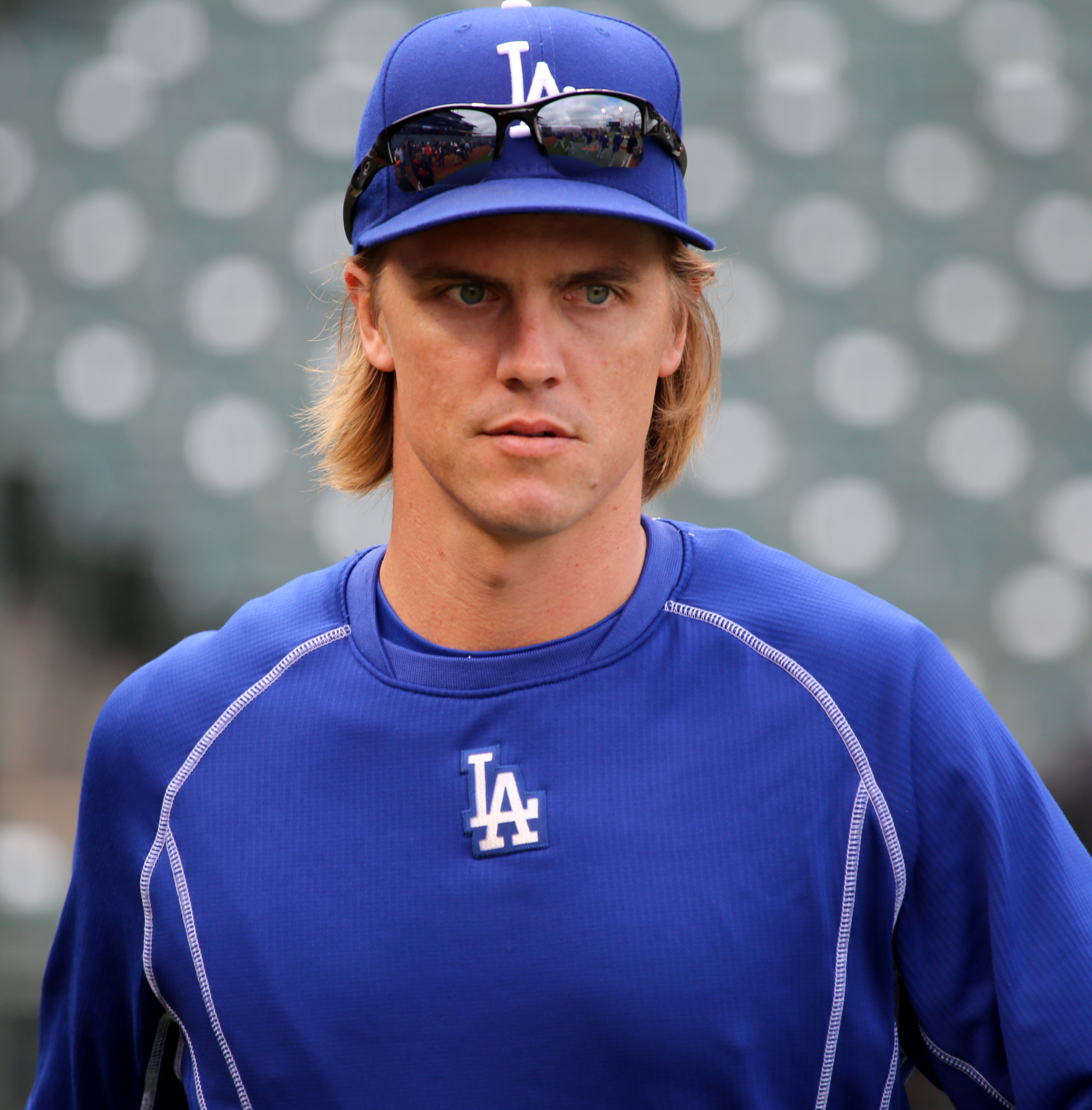
- Greinke with the Los Angeles Dodgers in 2015
- Pitcher
- Born: October 21, 1983 (age 43); Orlando, Florida, U.S.
- Batted: Right Threw: Right

MLB debut
- May 22, 2004, for the Kansas City Royals

Last MLB appearance
- October 1, 2023, for the Kansas City Royals

MLB statistics
- Win–loss record: 225–156
- Earned run average: 3.49
- Strikeouts: 2,979
- Stats at Baseball Reference

Teams
- Kansas City Royals (2004–2010); Milwaukee Brewers (2011–2012); Los Angeles Angels of Anaheim (2012); Los Angeles Dodgers (2013–2015); Arizona Diamondbacks (2016–2019); Houston Astros (2019–2021); Kansas City Royals (2022–2023)

Career highlights and awards
- 6× All-Star (2009, 2014, 2015, 2017–2019); AL Cy Young Award (2009); 6× Gold Glove Award (2014–2019); 2× Silver Slugger Award (2013, 2019); 2× MLB ERA leader (2009, 2015); Kansas City Royals Hall of Fame

Donald Zackary Greinke (/ˈɡreɪnki/ GRAYN-kee; born October 21, 1983) is an American former professional baseball pitcher. Greinke played in Major League Baseball (MLB) for 20 seasons for the Kansas City Royals, Milwaukee Brewers, Los Angeles Angels of Anaheim, Los Angeles Dodgers, Arizona Diamondbacks, and Houston Astros. He is considered to be one of the greatest pitchers of his generation.

The Royals selected Greinke in the first round with the sixth pick of the 2002 MLB draft, after he won the Gatorade National Player of the Year Award as a high school senior. After playing in the minor leagues, he made his MLB debut in 2004. His career was nearly derailed by his battles with depression and anxiety in 2005 and 2006, and he missed most of the 2006 season. He returned in 2007 as a relief pitcher, before rejoining the starting rotation in 2008 and developing into one of the top pitchers in the game. In 2009, he appeared in the MLB All-Star Game, led the major leagues in earned run average (ERA), and won the American League Cy Young Award.

Following his first stint with the Royals, Greinke played for the Brewers, Angels, Dodgers, Diamondbacks, and Astros across 2011 to 2021. During this time, he won six consecutive Gold Glove Awards from 2014 to 2019, and led MLB in ERA for a second time in 2015 with the Dodgers. In 2022 he returned to the Royals.

Greinke was a six-time All-Star, six-time Gold Glove Award winner, two-time Silver Slugger Award winner, two-time earned run average leader, and an American League Cy Young Award recipient. Greinke is one of three pitchers to win each of the Gold Glove, Silver Slugger, and Cy Young Awards, along with Fernando Valenzuela and Orel Hershiser.

Greinke is also one of only five pitchers (Nolan Ryan, Randy Johnson, Greg Maddux, and Roger Clemens) to strike out 1,000 different batters, with his 1,000th strikeout coming against Joey Wiemer on May 14, 2023.

== Early life ==
Greinke was born in Orlando, Florida, the son of teachers Donald and Marsha Greinke. He is of German descent, and was active in Little League and also excelled in tennis and golf tournaments as a youth. As a teenager, Greinke helped lead his team to the Senior League World Series title in 1999. He played shortstop for the team, and his coach estimated that he hit close to .700 in the tournament.

Greinke was primarily a shortstop when he started playing baseball at Apopka High School. He hit over .400 with 31 home runs in his high school career. He worked as a relief pitcher as a sophomore and junior, before becoming a starting pitcher as a senior. During his senior season, in 2002, Greinke compiled a 9–2 win–loss record, a 0.55 earned run average (ERA), and 118 strikeouts in 63 innings. He also held opposing batters to a .107 average. He led his team to a 32–2 record and their third straight district title, and was selected as Gatorade National Player of the Year. After the high school season ended, he played in the Florida Athletic Coaches Association All-Star Classic and impressed pro scouts with his performance against some of the best hitters in the country.

== Professional career ==
=== Draft and minor leagues ===
The Kansas City Royals selected Greinke in the first round, with the sixth overall selection, of the 2002 Major League Baseball draft. They felt Greinke was a polished player who could move quickly through their system. Greinke turned down a scholarship offer from Clemson University to sign with the Royals for a $2.5 million signing bonus.

Greinke pitched in six minor league games (five starts) for the Royals farm teams in 2002: three games for the Gulf Coast Royals, two for the Low-A Spokane Indians, and two innings for the High-A Wilmington Blue Rocks of the Carolina League. He had a 3.97 ERA in 11 1/3 innings.

In 2003, Greinke opened the season with Wilmington, where he was 11–1 with a 1.14 ERA in 14 starts. Those numbers earned him spots on both the Carolina League mid-season and post-season all-star teams as well as Carolina League Pitcher of the Year award. The Blue Rocks' manager, Billy Gardner, Jr., remarked that Greinke was "the best pitcher I've ever seen at this level of the minor leagues." He was promoted in July to the Double-A Wichita Wranglers of the Texas League, where in nine starts he was 4–3 with a 3.23 ERA. He had a couple of games where he struggled at Wichita and gave up a lot of runs. However, he bounced back and helped them make the playoffs with a victory in the final game of the season.

Greinke was named the organization's Minor League Pitcher of the Year for 2003. He was promoted by the Royals in 2004 to the Triple-A Omaha Royals of the Pacific Coast League, where he was 1–1 with a 2.51 ERA in six starts.

=== Kansas City Royals (2004–2010) ===
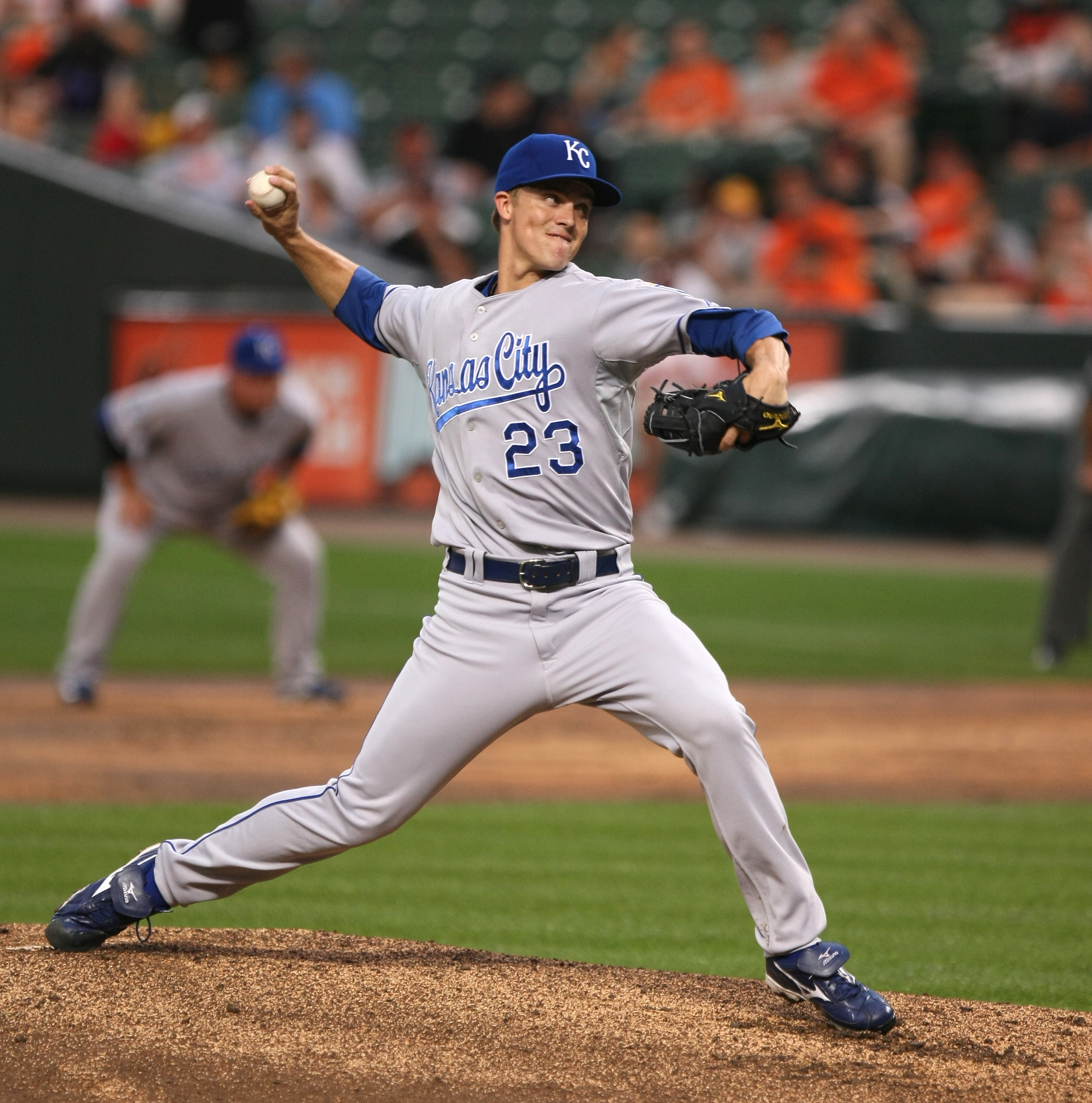
Greinke pitching for the Kansas City Royals in 2009

Greinke was called up to the major leagues on May 22, 2004, and made his major league debut against the Oakland Athletics, allowing two earned runs in five innings. At 20 years old, he was the youngest player in the majors and came close to picking up the win, but the team's closer, Jeremy Affeldt, gave up the lead with two outs in the bottom of the ninth inning.

Greinke recorded his first career win on June 8, when he pitched seven scoreless innings against the Montreal Expos. In 24 starts, Greinke finished the 2004 season with an 8–11 record and a 3.97 ERA.

On June 10, 2005, Greinke recorded his first major league hit; a home run off Arizona Diamondbacks pitcher Russ Ortiz in a 12–11 loss. However, he also allowed 15 hits and 11 runs in that game. The 15 hits allowed tied a franchise record, while the 11 runs set a club record. In 2005, Greinke led the American League in losses, finishing with a 5–17 record and a 5.80 ERA in 33 starts.

Greinke was sometimes quiet and awkward in the clubhouse. To alleviate some of his anxiety and solitude, the Royals made arrangements for him to live with Royals Hall of Fame third baseman George Brett. Still, by the 2005–2006 off-season he nearly quit baseball; Greinke later remarked that, at the time, he did not expect to return. He left spring training for personal reasons in late February 2006. It was later revealed that he was diagnosed with depression and a social anxiety disorder. He reported back to the Royals' spring training facility in Surprise, Arizona, on April 17, where he underwent ongoing pitching sessions. He was placed on the 60-day disabled list due to psychological issues and took time away from baseball entirely. He began seeing a sports psychologist and taking anti-depressant medication. Greinke only made three appearances out of the bullpen in 2006, and finished the year 1–0 with a 4.26 ERA.

In 2007, Greinke returned to the Royals rotation at the start of the season, but was assigned to the bullpen in early May. In 52 appearances (14 starts), Greinke finished 2007 with a 7–7 record, one save, and a 3.69 ERA.

Greinke returned to the rotation in 2008 and performed well that season. He made 32 starts in 2008 and finished with a 13–10 record along with 183 strikeouts. His 3.47 ERA was the best by a full-time Royals starter in 11 years. On January 26, 2009, he agreed to a four-year contract with the Royals worth $38 million.

After ending the 2008 season with 15 scoreless innings, Greinke started off 2009 by not allowing a run in his first 24 innings, which meant that for 39 innings in a row, he had not given up a run. Greinke was named American League (AL) Pitcher of the Month for April, his five wins, 0.50 ERA and 44 strikeouts all tops in the Majors. On August 25, Greinke struck out 15 batters, breaking Mark Gubicza's team record for strikeouts in a single game. On August 30, Greinke had a one-hit complete game against the Seattle Mariners.

Greinke's record for the 2009 season was 16–8, and he posted an ERA of 2.16, the lowest in MLB. On October 21, he was named American League Pitcher of the Year by Sporting News. On October 28, Greinke was awarded the MLBPA Players Choice AL Pitcher of the Year. On November 17, 2009, he won the AL Cy Young Award. Greinke credited some of his performance to his use of "modern pitching metrics" — statistics on team defense and defense independent pitching statistics — to calibrate his own approach to pitching. Greinke specifically mentioned FIP (fielding independent pitching), an indicator developed by sabermetrician Tom Tango, as his favorite statistic. "That's pretty much how I pitch, to try to keep my FIP as low as possible.

Despite a stellar 2009 season, his performance in 2010 began to regress as he finished the year 10–14 with a 4.17 ERA and 181 strikeouts.

=== Milwaukee Brewers (2011–2012) ===
On December 17, 2010, Greinke reportedly asked the Royals to trade him, claiming that he was not motivated to play for a rebuilding team. The Royals were unlikely to afford signing Greinke to a long-term deal once he became a free agent, so they agreed to trade him for some quality prospects. On December 19, he was traded to the Milwaukee Brewers with Yuniesky Betancourt and $2 million for Alcides Escobar, Lorenzo Cain, Jeremy Jeffress, and Jake Odorizzi. He was given the number 13, instead of his preferred number 23, due to number 23 already being issued to Rickie Weeks. Greinke would later admit that he handled the trade request poorly, saying that he was "pretty rude" on the way out, but the deal worked out well for both teams.

In February 2011, before reporting to his first spring training with the Brewers, Greinke suffered a fractured rib while playing basketball. He started the 2011 season on the disabled list.

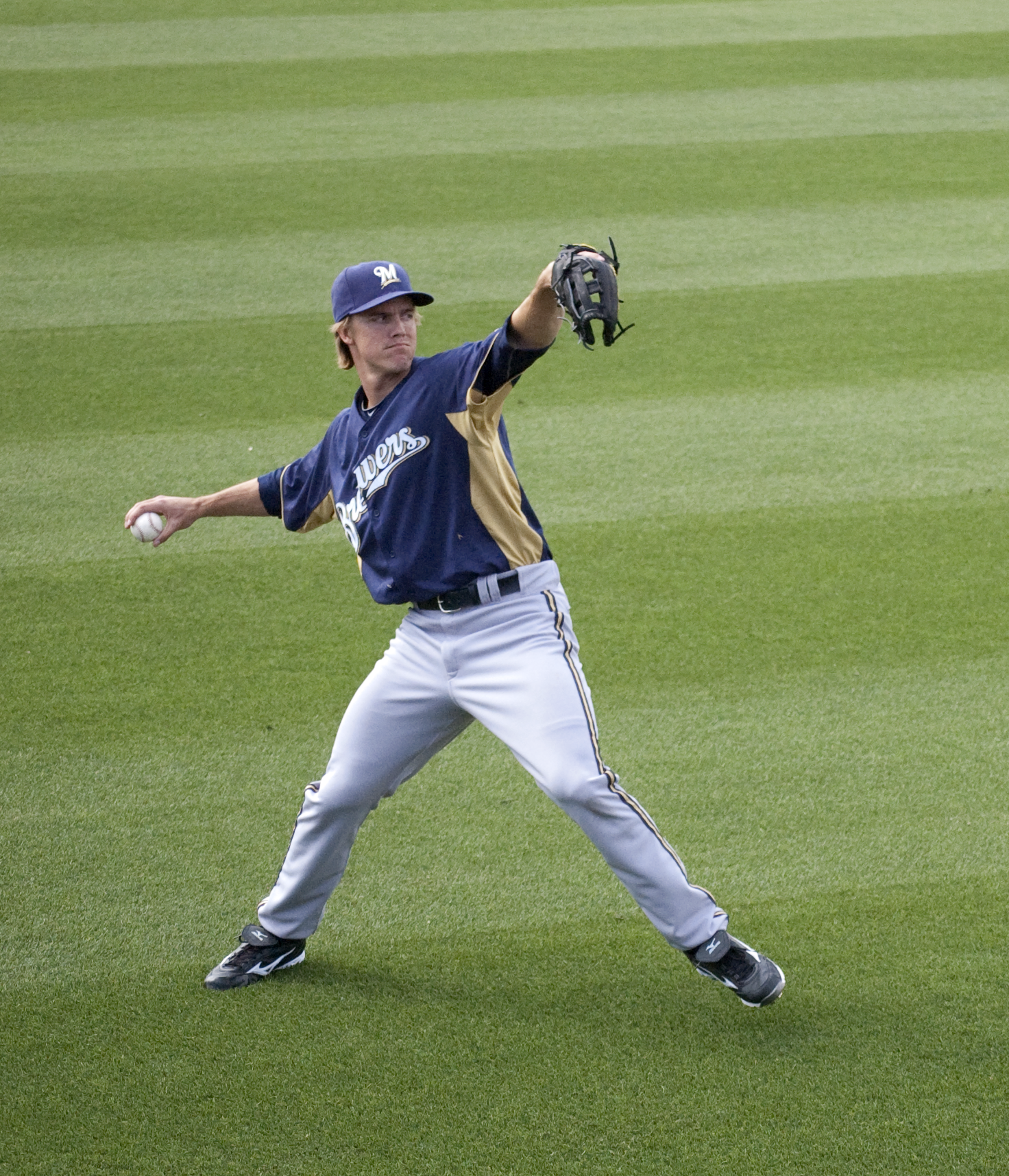
Greinke with the Milwaukee Brewers in 2011

Greinke made his Brewers debut in the second game of a doubleheader on May 4, 2011. Despite missing the first month of the season because of his injury, Greinke finished second on the team in wins with a 16–6 record in 28 starts. He also had a 3.83 ERA, and 201 strikeouts (seventh in the National League (NL)) in 171 innings pitched while surrendering just 45 walks. Greinke became only the fifth Brewer pitcher to strike out 200+ batters in a season. He was fourth in the NL in won-lost percentage (.727) and sixth in wins. He went a perfect 11–0 in his starts at Miller Park, the Brewers' home stadium.

On April 7, 2012, the Brewers defeated the Cardinals 6–0 in Greinke's first start of the season after he pitched seven scoreless innings while giving up four hits and striking out seven.

In an oddity, Greinke became the first pitcher to start three straight games in the Majors in 95 years. On July 7, he was ejected from the game after just four pitches for angrily throwing the ball into the ground following a close play at first base. The following day, Greinke started again, but lasted only until the third inning. The All-Star break followed, and Greinke was the Brewers' starter on July 13, the team's next game. Greinke's third start ended after five innings. Before this, the most recent pitcher to start three consecutive games was Red Faber in 1917, who started both games of a September 3 doubleheader, throwing just six innings in total, followed by a complete game win the following day.

To begin 2012, Greinke made 21 starts with the Brewers and had a 9–3 record, 120 strikeouts, and a 3.44 ERA.

=== Los Angeles Angels of Anaheim (2012) ===
Despite his success with the Brewers, the team was struggling and not likely to make a playoff run. When talks on a contract extension broke down, the team traded Greinke to the Los Angeles Angels of Anaheim on July 27, 2012, in exchange for top infield prospect Jean Segura and pitchers Ariel Peña and Johnny Hellweg. Brewers General Manager Doug Melvin remarked that it was one of the tougher decisions he had to make because he was fond of Greinke.

Greinke made his first start for the Angels on July 29. After a stretch of four unproductive starts from August 3–19 (1–1, 7.20 ERA in 25 innings), Greinke followed up with four consecutive starts of at least seven innings and two or fewer runs — all of them wins. In those starts, he produced a 1.88 ERA in 28 1/3 innings.

Greinke became the first pitcher since 1920 to record 13 strikeouts in five innings or less in a game against the Seattle Mariners on September 25. He then combined with four other Angels pitchers to tie an American League record by striking out 20 batters in a nine-inning game. He finished his time with the Angels with a 6–2 record and a 3.53 ERA in 13 starts. Overall in 2012, combined with both teams, Greinke made 34 starts with a 15–5 record, 200 strikeouts, and a 3.48 ERA.

=== Los Angeles Dodgers (2013–2015) ===
Greinke agreed to a six-year free agent contract with the Los Angeles Dodgers worth $147 million, on December 8, 2012. The deal, which was finalized on December 10, was the largest ever for a right-handed pitcher at the time it was signed. It was surpassed a year later by Félix Hernández's seven-year, $175 million contract extension with the Seattle Mariners. Greinke later explained that he chose the Dodgers over the Texas Rangers, who also were pursuing him, primarily because they offered more money.

On April 11, 2013, Greinke fractured his left collarbone in a brawl with Carlos Quentin of the San Diego Padres after Quentin was hit by an inside pitch and charged the mound. He was placed on the disabled list and it was revealed that he would require surgery, which was performed on April 13. It was estimated that he would miss eight weeks of the season. However, he returned to action on May 10 when he pitched in a rehab game for the Class-A Rancho Cucamonga Quakes. He returned to the Dodgers on May 15, tossing 5 1/3 innings of one-run ball and striking out four to earn the win.

On June 11, 2013, Greinke was hit in the head and neck area by Arizona Diamondbacks pitcher Ian Kennedy, leading to a bench-clearing brawl. Because Greinke did not participate in the brawl, he was unaffected.

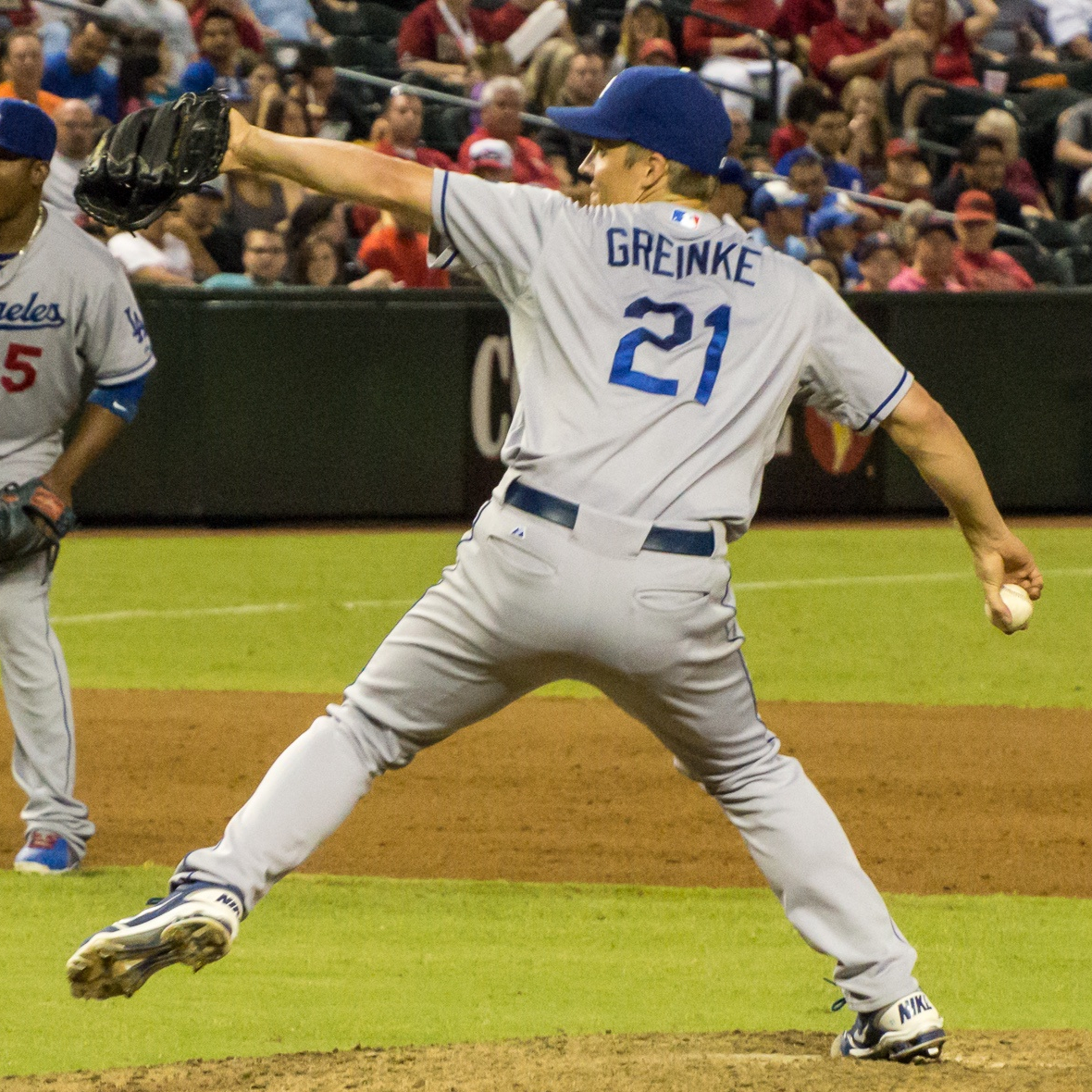
Greinke with the Los Angeles Dodgers in 2013

Greinke picked up his 100th career win on August 5, 2013, against the St. Louis Cardinals. He was 5–0 with a 1.23 ERA during the month of August and was selected as National League Pitcher of the Month. Greinke finished his first season with the Dodgers with a 15–4 record and 2.63 ERA in 28 starts. He also batted .328, the highest batting average for a Dodgers pitcher since Orel Hershiser in the 1993 season. He was awarded with the Silver Slugger Award as the best hitting pitcher in the National League.

Greinke began the 2014 season by setting an MLB record with 22 straight starts (dating back to July 2013) where he allowed two or fewer earned runs. He was selected to the National League squad at the 2014 Major League Baseball All-Star Game and finished the season with a 17–8 record and a 2.71 ERA in 32 starts, the highest win total in his career. He won the Gold Glove Award as the best fielding pitcher in the National League.

When Justin Upton of the San Diego Padres homered against Greinke in the eighth inning on June 13, 2015, it was the last run he surrendered until the All-Star break. Greinke was then selected to the All-Star Game, his second straight appearance, and chosen to be the starting pitcher for the National League squad. At that point in the season, Greinke carried a major league-leading 1.48 ERA with a 7–2 record. After Greinke retired 28 consecutive batters over a span of two starts, Nationals outfielder Michael Taylor ended the streak in the third inning on July 19.

Greinke's recorded a scoreless innings streak which reached 45 innings; it started on June 18 and ended on July 26 start against the New York Mets at Citi Field and is the sixth-longest streak in MLB history. He shared the NL Player of the Week honors with his teammate Clayton Kershaw for July 13–19. Greinke finished the 2015 season with a 19–3 record, 200 strikeouts, and a major-league-best 1.66 ERA. His ERA was the second lowest in Dodgers history behind Rube Marquard in 1916, and his ERA+ (225) and major-league-leading WHIP (0.844) were the best in franchise history. He led all major league pitchers in left on base percentage, stranding 86.5% of base runners.

Greinke pitched in two games in the 2015 National League Division Series against the New York Mets. He allowed five runs in 13 2/3 innings and took the loss in the deciding fifth game in the series. At the conclusion of the series, it was announced that he would opt out of the last three years of his contract with the Dodgers and become a free agent. He officially opted out on November 3.

After the season, Greinke was selected as the Outstanding National League Pitcher at the Players Choice Awards, and won his second Gold Glove Award. Greinke finished second in the NL Cy Young Award voting to Jake Arrieta.

=== Arizona Diamondbacks (2016–2019) ===
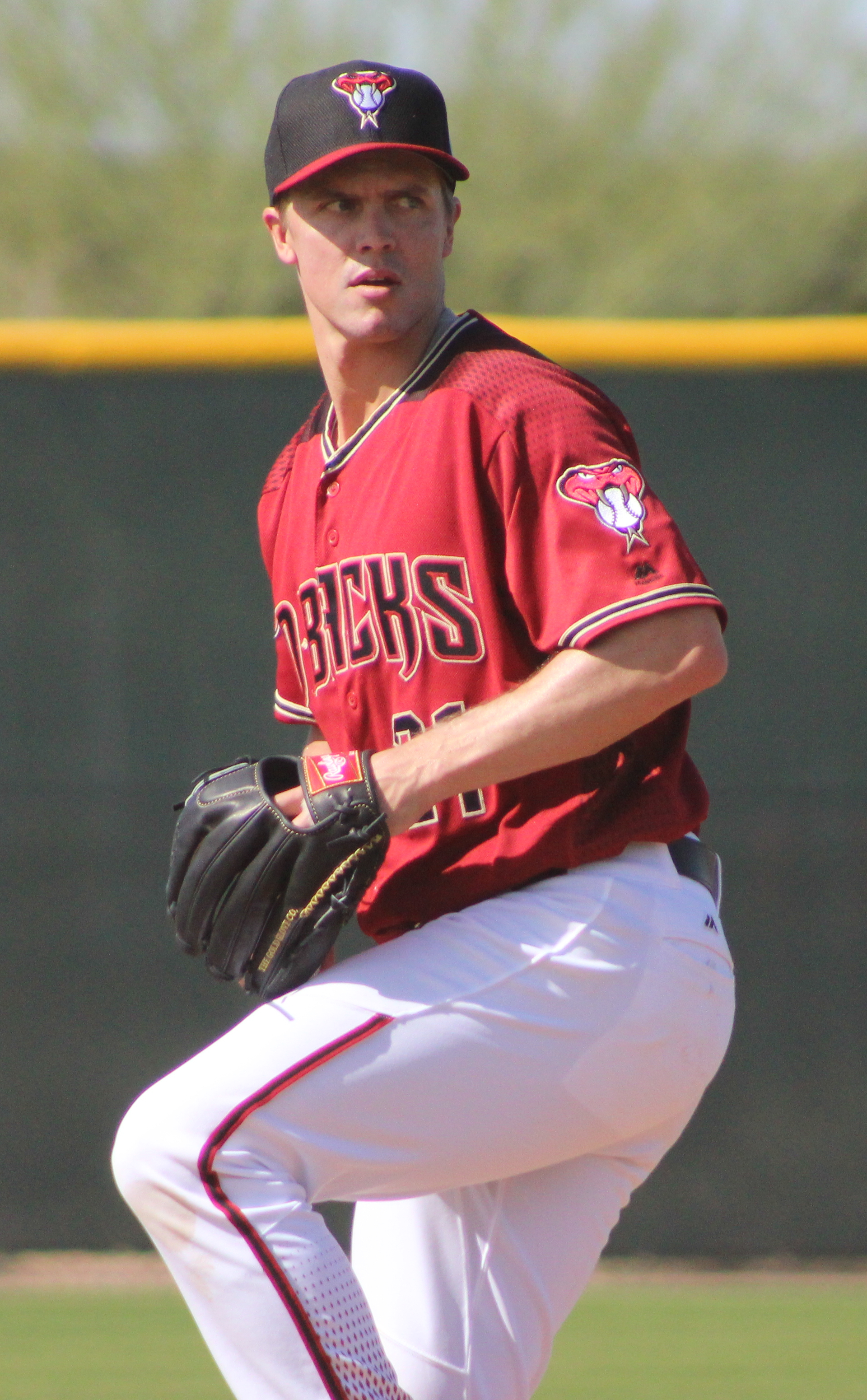
Greinke with the Arizona Diamondbacks in 2016

On December 8, 2015, Greinke signed a six-year, $206.5 million contract with the Arizona Diamondbacks. Greinke started on Opening Day 2016 at Chase Field against the Colorado Rockies; he gave up seven runs in four innings, including two home runs to rookie shortstop Trevor Story, who was making his MLB debut. The Diamondbacks lost the game 10–5. In his second start, on April 9, Greinke matched up against Kyle Hendricks and the Chicago Cubs. He allowed three runs in the first inning, and struggled through the rest of his outing. The Diamondbacks lost the game 4–2. Greinke got his first win as a Diamondback on April 19, 2016, against the San Francisco Giants, allowing just one run in over six innings of work. On July 3, 2016, Greinke was placed on the 15-day disabled list due to a left oblique strain. On August 24, 2016, he recorded his 2000th career strikeout in the Diamondbacks' 10–9 win over Atlanta Braves. Greinke made 26 starts in his first season with Arizona, and he had a 13–7 record and a 4.37 ERA in 158 2/3 innings. He won his third consecutive Gold Glove Award after the season.

In 2017, Greinke was selected to the NL All-Star team, his fourth All-Star selection. At the time of his selection he was 10–4 with a 3.05 ERA in 109 1/3 innings, 128 strikeouts (10.21 strikeouts per nine innings), WHIP of 1.02 and a .219 opponents batting average. On September 16 versus the San Francisco Giants at AT&T Park, he completed eight shutout innings with two hits allowed and eight strikeouts as Arizona won, 2−0. His game score of 90 was the second-best of his career, and he also hit two doubles at the plate. In 32 starts in 2017, Greinke finished with a 17–7 record, 215 strikeouts, and a 3.20 ERA in 202 1/3 innings. The Diamondbacks finished with a 93–69 record and clinched a Wild Card spot, but lost to the Dodgers in the Division Series. Greinke won his fourth consecutive Gold Glove Award after the 2017 season. He also finished fourth in the Cy Young voting behind Max Scherzer, Clayton Kershaw and Stephen Strasburg.

Greinke was once again named an All-Star in 2018. He finished the season with a 15–11 record and a 3.21 ERA in 33 starts. Following the season, he won his fifth consecutive Gold Glove Award.

On April 2, 2019, Greinke hit two home runs and struck out 10 as the Diamondbacks won 8–5 against the Padres. In 2019 with Arizona before he was traded, he was 10–4 with a 2.90 ERA.

Greinke batted .271 with three home runs and 8 RBI with the Diamondbacks in 2019, earning him his second career Silver Slugger Award.

=== Houston Astros (2019–2021) ===
On July 31, 2019, the Diamondbacks traded Greinke to the Houston Astros with cash considerations for four minor league prospects: Corbin Martin, J. B. Bukauskas, Seth Beer, and Josh Rojas. The Diamondbacks also agreed to pay $24 million of Greinke's remaining $77 million salary.

Greinke earned the 200th win in his career on August 18, 2019, to become the 32nd pitcher to attain the win total along with 2,500th strikeouts. He joined rotation-mate Justin Verlander and CC Sabathia as active players to win 200 or more games. On September 14, 2019, against the Kansas City Royals, Greinke became the 19th pitcher in MLB history to win a game against all 30 MLB franchises. On September 25, Greinke came within two outs of his first career no-hitter while earning the win that was the Astros' club record-breaking 104th of the season. The no-hit bid was interrupted by Austin Nola's single to center field in the bottom of the ninth. In 10 starts as a member of the Astros, he was 8–1 with a 3.02 ERA.

Between Arizona and Houston in 2019, Greinke was 18–5 (18 wins ranked fourth in the major leagues) with a 2.93 ERA (tenth in the major leagues) in 208 2/3 innings (sixth) over 33 starts. He walked only 30 batters (1.3 walks per nine innings, the best ratio of his career and third-best in the major leagues), and had a WHIP of 0.982 (fifth-best). At the plate, he batted .280/.308/.580 with three home runs and 8 RBI in 50 at bats. On defense, Greinke led pitchers in both the NL (8) and AL (4) in double plays turned; moreover, the 12 double plays by pitchers tied for second all-time in a single season to only Bob Lemon (15 in 1953). (Note: Greinke tied Eddie Rommel (1920), Curt Davis (1934), and Randy Jones (1976).)

Greinke started Games 3 and 7 of the 2019 World Series for Houston. Greinke allowed two runs on two hits in 6 1/3 innings in his Game 7 start. He was pulled by manager A. J. Hinch in the seventh inning after surrendering a one-out home run to Anthony Rendon, followed by a walk to Juan Soto, with the Astros leading 2–1. He was replaced by Will Harris, who allowed a two-run home run to Howie Kendrick. The Astros lost the game 6–2, prompting questions by members of the media about Hinch's decision to pull Greinke. In addition to the Silver Slugger Award, Greinke won his sixth Gold Glove. Thus, Greinke became the second pitcher to win both during the same season, succeeding Mike Hampton in 2003. Greinke was also selected to the inaugural edition of the All-MLB Second Team, one of six Astros on the All-MLB Team.

In 2020, Greinke produced a 3–3 record with a 4.03 ERA in 12 starts spanning 67 innings, and was second in the AL in walks per nine innings (1.209) and fourth in home runs per nine innings (0.806).

On April 1, 2021, Greinke earned his first Opening Day win and 209th win overall as the Astros defeated the Oakland Athletics, 8–1, at the Oakland Coliseum. He pitched six scoreless innings, the 65th time his career he has produced at least six scoreless innings. In the May 25 contest versus the Los Angeles Dodgers, he reached 3,000 career innings, the 135th pitcher in major league history to achieve this milestone. On June 4, 2021, Greinke threw a complete game for the first time since April 19, 2017. He allowed six hits with one run and one walk and three strikeouts in a 13–1 win over the Toronto Blue Jays at Sahlen Field in Buffalo, New York.

In 2021, Greinke finished with an 11–6 record and 4.16 ERA over 30 games (29 starts). He ranked second in the AL in walks per nine innings (1.895) and fifth in WHIP (1.170) and home runs (30). In the World Series versus the Atlanta Braves, Greinke started Game 4, recording four scoreless innings. At the plate, he singled in the second inning to become the first Astros pitcher to get a hit in World Series play. In Game 5, he was called in as a pinch hitter in the fourth inning and recorded a single, becoming the first pitcher to record a pinch hit in the World Series since Jack Bentley in 1923. On November 3, 2021, Greinke was declared a free agent.

=== Return to Kansas City Royals (2022–2023) ===
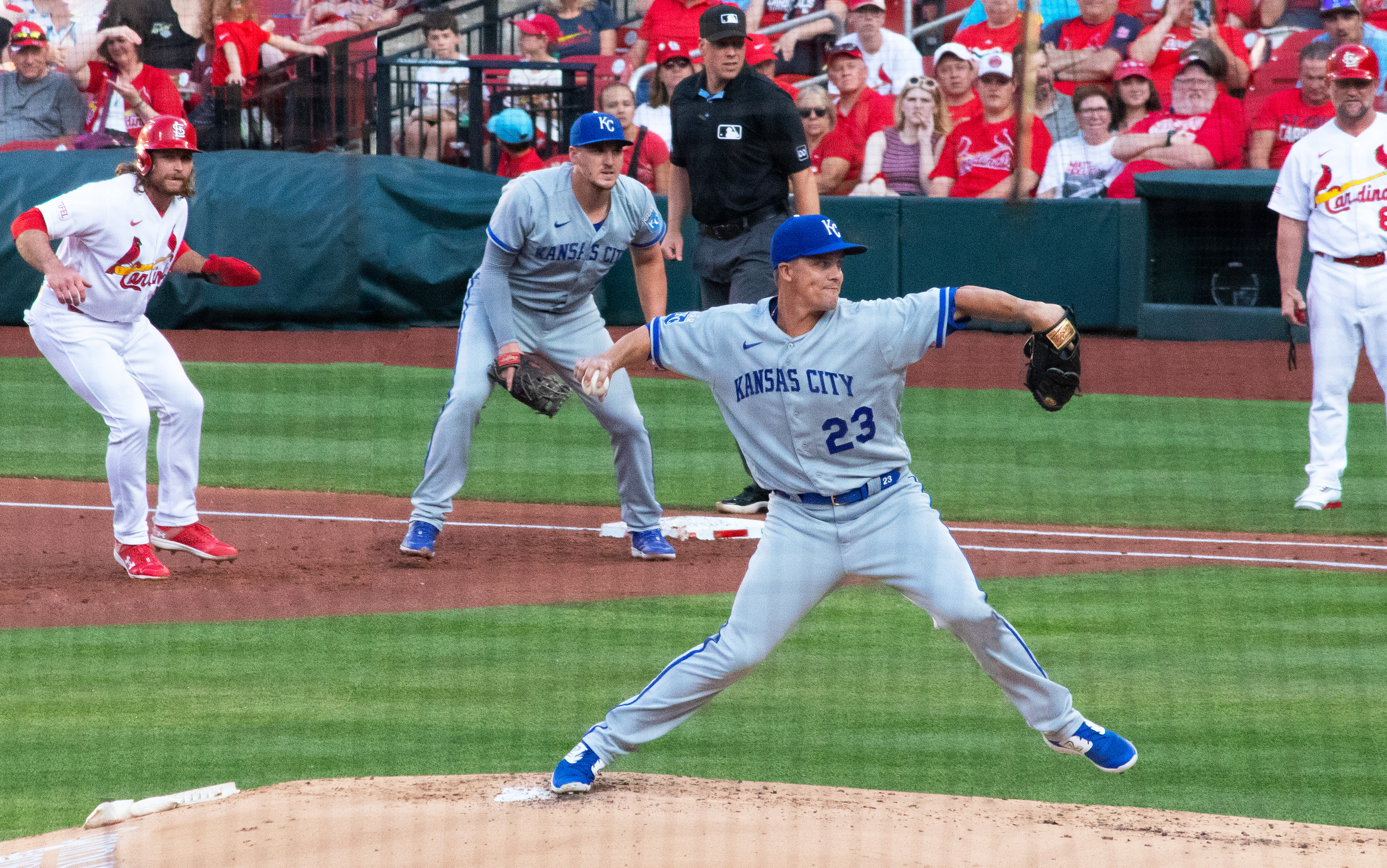
Greinke pitching for the Kansas City Royals against the Cardinals in 2023.

Greinke expressed interest in finishing his career with the Royals, which he mentioned to George Brett during the 2021–22 lockout. On March 16, 2022, Greinke signed a one-year, $13 million contract to return to the Royals. On March 31, Greinke was announced as the Royals' Opening Day starter, the first time he'd been given the role for the Royals since 2010, marking the largest gap between Opening Day pitching starts for the same team. He made his 500th career start on June 29 versus the Texas Rangers, going six innings in a 2−1 win. Greinke finished 4–9 with a 3.68 ERA in 26 starts with the Royals in 2022.

Greinke re-signed with the Royals on a one-year contract worth $8.5 million on February 3, 2023. On March 24, Greinke was named the Royals' Opening Day starter for the second consecutive year. On May 15, Greinke became the fifth pitcher (after Nolan Ryan, Randy Johnson, Roger Clemens, and Greg Maddux) to strike out 1,000 unique batters over his career. He became a free agent following the season.

As of September 2025, Greinke had not officially announced retirement but had not pitched in the 2024 and 2025 seasons, last having pitched in October 2023. He is only 21 strikeouts short of 3,000, a milestone that only 20 MLB players have achieved.

== Pitching style ==
Greinke throws six different pitches:

- Four-seam fastball — 88–92 miles per hour (142–148 km/h)
- Two-seam fastball — 86–91 miles per hour (138–146 km/h)
- Cutter — 85–89 miles per hour (137–143 km/h)
- Slider — 85–87 miles per hour (137–140 km/h)
- Curveball — 66–77 miles per hour (106–124 km/h)
- Changeup — 86–90 miles per hour (138–145 km/h)

His curveball has two speeds with different types of movement, and he will sometimes throw a curve that is more in the middle range combining the types of movement. His two-seamer is his most-used pitch against right-handed hitters and is used more frequently than against lefties, as is his slider. His changeup is thrown only to left-handed hitters. Greinke's curveball is typically used early in the count, while his slider is his most common two-strike pitch.

Greinke's slider has been one of his more effective pitches. Hitters have only a .154 batting average and .230 slugging percentage against the pitch. It has produced 51% of his strikeouts. Its whiff rate is 42%, and more than half the pitches put in play are ground balls. However, he limits the use of the slider in order not to put excessive strain on his arm.

Greinke has produced good strikeout-to-walk ratios throughout his career, finishing in his league's top 10 eleven times.

Greinke has been described as a "scientist as a pitcher" and is known for preparing for each start more extensively than most.

Owing to his upright overhand pitching style, with a pause where the ball is hidden down next to his right knee before release, a forward-facing follow-through, and late movement that reaches the lower third of the strike zone, he is in an excellent position for fielding soft, short hits coming at him, which helped him gain many assists and six consecutive NL Gold Glove Awards as a pitcher. He was still awarded an NL Gold Glove in 2019 because he started the 2019 season in Arizona before being traded.

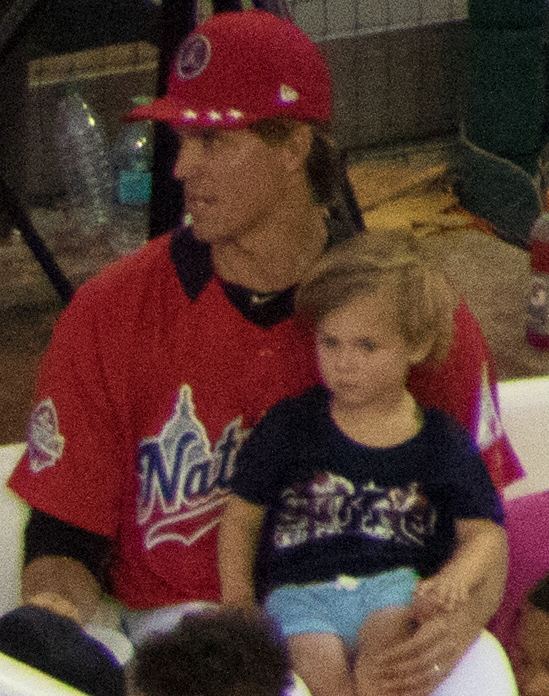
Greinke with his son at the 2018 Major League Baseball Home Run Derby

== Batting ==
Along with Fernando Valenzuela and Orel Hershiser, Greinke is just one three pitchers to win each of the Cy Young, Silver Slugger, and Gold Glove Awards.

Greinke is a good hitting pitcher, having won two Silver Slugger Awards in his career with a .225 batting average. He has also amassed nine stolen bases over his career (on ten stolen base attempts), and he has expressed a desire to end his career with ten home runs and ten stolen bases; he has nine of each, with his last home run and stolen base each being in 2019. In 2013 he hit .328 (19 for 58), the seventh highest batting average for a pitcher in the DH era. He entered Game 5 of the 2021 World Series as a pinch-hitter and recorded a hit, being the first pitcher to have a pinch hit in a World Series game since Jack Bentley of the New York Giants in 1923. As of 2025, he is the last pitcher to have a hit in a postseason game, as the designated hitter was introduced in the National League in 2022, meaning that the pitcher is not required to hit at any point. In his fourth at-bat as a major leaguer, Greinke hit his first home run. Years later, when teammate Alex Gordon was in a slump, Greinke had the idea to take him into the video room and show the clip of his home run multiple times before leaving by saying, "Do more of that."

== Personal life ==
Greinke is married to Emily Kuchar, whom he met while attending Apopka High School. Kuchar is a former Dallas Cowboys cheerleader and was Miss Daytona Beach USA 2008. Their sons were born in 2015, 2017, and 2021. They reside in Orlando, Florida.

Greinke's younger brother, Luke, was also a pitcher who played college baseball at Auburn University. Luke was drafted by the New York Yankees in the 12th round (380th overall) of the 2008 MLB draft, but was out of baseball a year later because of injuries.

== See also ==
- Arizona Diamondbacks award winners and league leaders
- Houston Astros award winners and league leaders
- Kansas City Royals award winners and league leaders
- List of Houston Astros team records
- List of Los Angeles Dodgers team records
- List of Major League Baseball career double plays as a pitcher leaders
- List of Major League Baseball career games started leaders
- List of Major League Baseball career innings pitched leaders
- List of Major League Baseball career putouts as a pitcher leaders
- List of Major League Baseball career strikeout leaders
- List of Major League Baseball career wins leaders
- List of Major League Baseball postseason records
- List of Major League Baseball single-inning strikeout leaders
- List of World Series starting pitchers
- Los Angeles Dodgers award winners and league leaders

== Notes ==
Awards and achievements
Preceded by Jon Lester	American League Pitcher of the Month; April 2009	Succeeded by Justin Verlander
Preceded by Clayton Kershaw; Jon Lester	National League Pitcher of the Month; August 2013; July 2018	Succeeded by Kris Medlen; Cole Hamels
