= Bobby Witt Jr. =

American baseball player (born 2000)

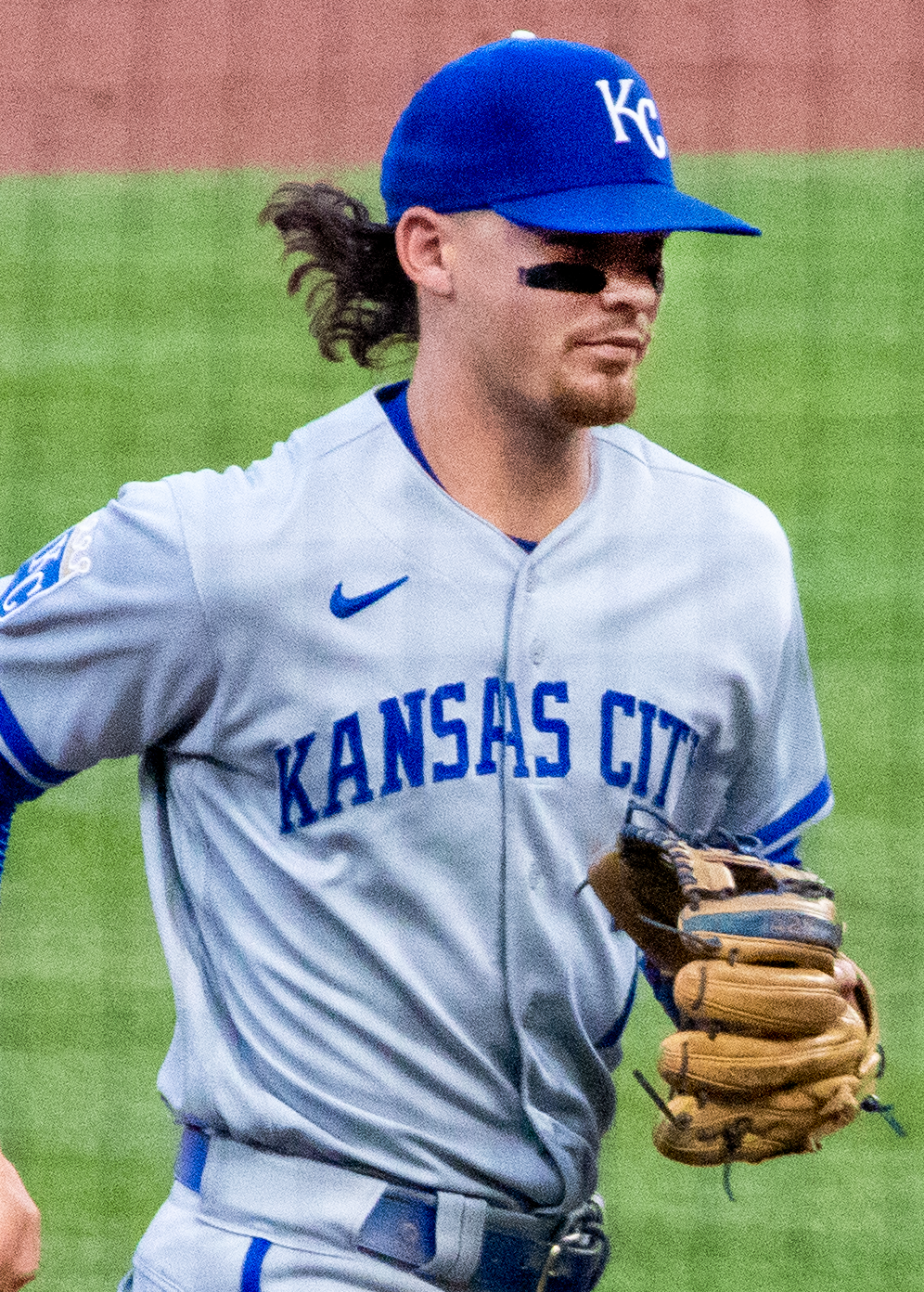
- Witt with the Kansas City Royals in 2023

Kansas City Royals – No. 7
- Shortstop
- Born: June 14, 2000 (age 26); Colleyville, Texas, U.S.
- Bats: Right Throws: Right

MLB debut
- April 7, 2022, for the Kansas City Royals

MLB statistics (through 2026 season)
- Batting average: .288
- Home runs: 123
- Runs batted in: 427
- Stolen bases: 193
- Stats at Baseball Reference

Teams
- Kansas City Royals (2022–present)

Career highlights and awards
- 3× All-Star (2024–2026); 3× All-MLB First Team (2024–2026); 2× Gold Glove Award (2024, 2025); 3× Silver Slugger Award (2024–2026); MLB batting champion (2024)
Medals
Men's baseball
Representing the United States
World Baseball Classic
| Silver medal – second place | 2023 Miami | Team |
| Silver medal – second place | 2026 Miami | Team |
COPABE U-18 Pan-American Championship
| Gold medal – first place | 2018 Panama | Team |

Robert Andrew Witt Jr. (born June 14, 2000) is an American professional baseball shortstop for the Kansas City Royals of Major League Baseball (MLB). The Royals selected him second overall in the 2019 MLB draft and he made his MLB debut in 2022. In 2024, Witt was named to his first All-Star Game and won his first Gold Glove Award and Silver Slugger Award. He repeated those honors in 2025 and additionally won the American League Platinum Glove Award. Witt was named to his third consecutive All-Star Game in 2026. Internationally, Witt represents the United States.

Witt is the first shortstop in MLB history to have achieved two 30–30 seasons (30 home runs and 30 stolen bases), having done so in 2023 and 2024; Francisco Lindor has since matched this feat, with 30–30 seasons in 2023 and 2025. Witt is also the first player in MLB history to hit 20 home runs and steal 30 bases in each of his first four seasons.

== Amateur career ==
Witt attended Colleyville Heritage High School in Colleyville, Texas. As a junior in 2018, he batted .446 with 10 home runs. That summer, he won the High School Home Run Derby at Nationals Park. Later that summer, he played in the Under Armour All-America Baseball Game at Wrigley Field, where he hit a home run and was named team MVP, as well as the Perfect Game All-American Classic at Petco Park. In his senior season in 2019, he was named the Gatorade National Baseball Player of the Year after batting .515 with 15 home runs, 54 RBI, and 17 stolen bases. He committed to play college baseball for the Oklahoma Sooners.

== Professional career ==
=== Minor leagues ===
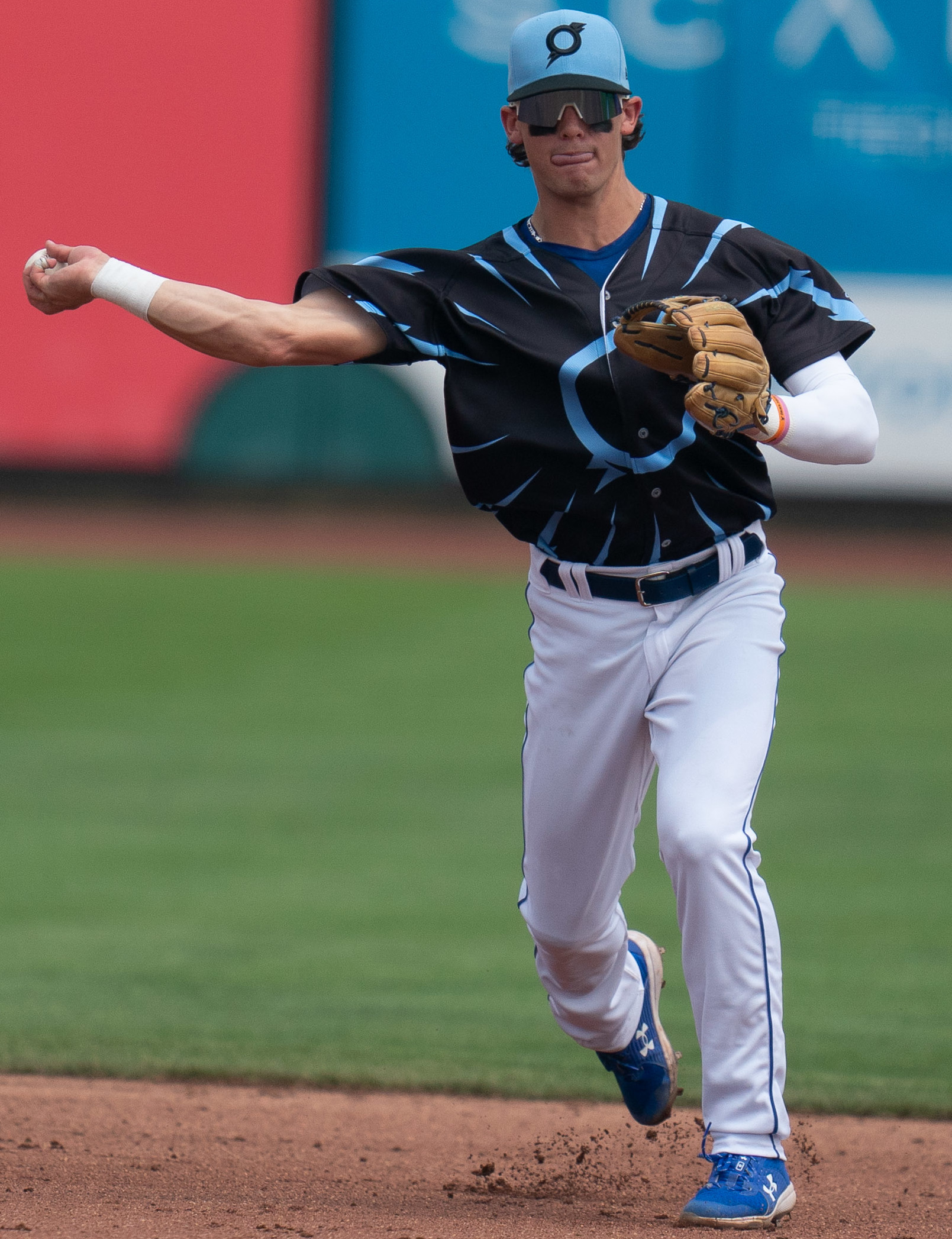
Witt with Omaha in 2021

Witt was one of the top prospects for the 2019 Major League Baseball draft. He was selected by the Kansas City Royals with the second overall pick. Forgoing his commitment to Oklahoma, he signed with the Royals for $7.79 million and made his professional debut at the end of June with the Rookie-level Arizona League Royals. In 37 games over two months, he batted .262/.317/.354 with one home run, 27 RBI, and nine stolen bases in 10 attempts.

Witt did not play a minor league game in 2020 due to the cancellation of the minor league season caused by the COVID-19 pandemic. He participated in the Royals alternate site training, impressing Royals leadership. He began the 2021 season with the Double-A Northwest Arkansas Naturals. In June, he was selected to play in the All-Star Futures Game at Coors Field. After batting .292/.369/.570 with 16 home runs, 50 RBI, and 14 stolen bases over 60 games, he was promoted in July to the Triple-A Omaha Storm Chasers. Over 62 games with Omaha, Witt slashed .285/.352/.581 with 17 home runs, 46 RBI, and 15 stolen bases. He was awarded both the USA Today Minor League Player of the Year Award and the Baseball America Minor League Player of the Year Award.

Witt in 2022

=== Kansas City Royals ===
==== 2022: Rookie season ====
Witt began practicing at third base during spring training in 2022. On April 5, the Royals announced that Witt had made their Opening Day roster. He made his MLB debut on Opening Day on April 7 as the Royals' starting third baseman, with Adalberto Mondesi starting shortstop, Witt's usual position. Witt hit his first major league home run on May 3 against the St. Louis Cardinals. In mid-May, Witt became the Royals starting shortstop, following an injury to Mondesi. Against the Detroit Tigers on September 3, Witt hit his 20th home run, making him the fifth player in MLB history to hit 20 home runs and steal 20 bases in their first season.

In 2022, Witt batted .254/.294/.428 in 591 at bats, with 80 RBI, six triples (4th in the AL), 20 home runs, 82 runs scored, and 30 steals (4th) in 37 attempts. He was the 10th-youngest player in the AL. He tied with Trea Turner for the fastest sprint speed in the majors among qualified batters, at 30.3 feet per second. He finished fourth in American League Rookie of the Year voting.

==== 2023: First 30–30 season ====
In 2023, Witt batted .276/.319/.495 with 30 home runs, 96 RBI, and a league-leading 49 stolen bases. He led the major leagues with 11 triples and became the first player in MLB history to have 30 home runs, 10 triples, and 45 stolen bases in one season. He was also the first Royals player to hit 30 home runs and steal 30 bases in a season. He tied with Elly De La Cruz as the fastest player in baseball, according to Statcast.

==== 2024: Extension, awards, and playoffs ====
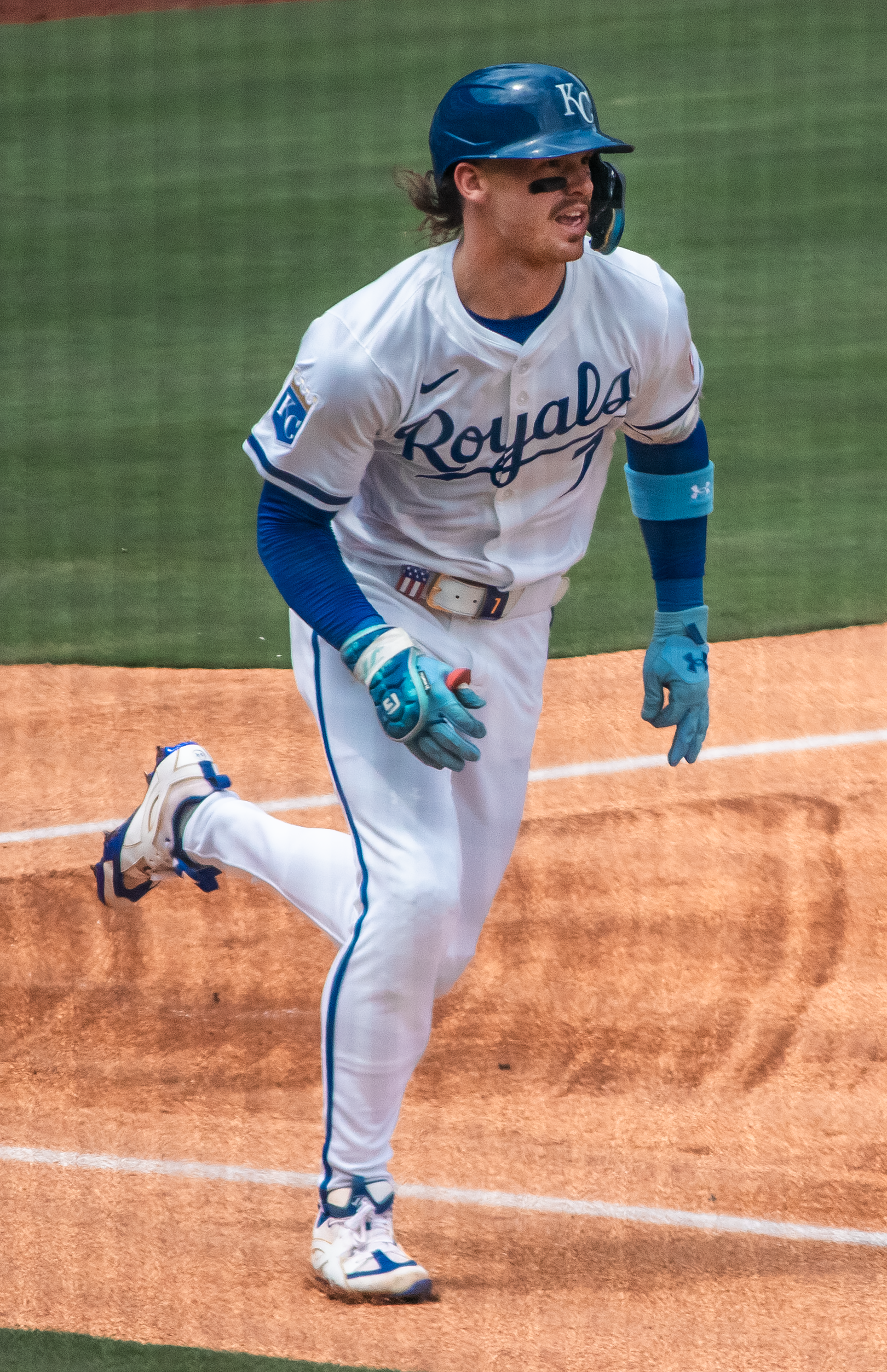
Witt running to first base in 2025.

On February 5, 2024, Witt signed an 11-year, $288.7 million contract extension with the Royals, the largest contract in franchise history. Witt can opt out of the contract after years seven, eight, nine, or ten, and the Royals can exercise a three-year option following the 11th season. In 2024, Witt played in his first All-Star Game and his first Home Run Derby, with his brother-in-law, former MLB pitcher James Russell, serving as his pitcher. In August, Witt became the first player with 20 home runs and 20 stolen bases in his first three MLB seasons, a feat matched by Julio Rodríguez in September.

Witt hit .332/.389/.588, with his .332 batting average and 211 hits leading all of MLB. He also had his second consecutive 30–30 season, hitting 32 home runs and stealing 31 bases. Witt became the first shortstop in MLB history with multiple 30–30 seasons in his career, and the first player to do so back-to-back since Alfonso Soriano in 2005-2006. Witt won his first Gold Glove and Silver Slugger awards, the first shortstop to win both awards since Brandon Crawford in 2015. He finished second in American League MVP voting behind Aaron Judge with all 30 second-place votes. He continued to be the fastest runner in baseball.

Witt played in his first MLB postseason after helping the Royals improve from losing 106 games in 2023 to winning 86 games in 2024. He went 3-for-9 with 2 RBI in the Royals' two-game road sweep of the Baltimore Orioles in the Wild Card Series. However, the Royals wilted against the New York Yankees in the subsequent AL Division Series, losing three games to one, as Witt only hit two singles and drew one walk in 18 plate appearances.

==== 2025 ====
Witt was named to the 2025 Major League Baseball All-Star Game, his second consecutive selection. He hit his 100th career home run in a game versus the Texas Rangers on August 19, 2025, becoming the fourth player in MLB history to record at least 100 home runs and 100 stolen bases in their first four seasons (joining Bobby Bonds, Darryl Strawberry, and Julio Rodriguez). On August 30, Witt became the first player in MLB history to hit 20 home runs and steal 30 bases in each of his first four seasons. He finished the season hitting .295/.351/.501 with 184 hits and 47 doubles, both leading all of MLB. On November 2, 2025, Witt was awarded his second consecutive Gold Glove Award for American League shortstops. He also became the first player in Royals history to win multiple Gold Glove Awards at shortstop. The only other player in franchise history to win the award at short was Alcides Escobar (2015). On November 7, Witt won the Platinum Glove Award for his elite defense with the team, making him the fourth player in MLB history to win Silver Slugger, Gold Glove, and Platinum Glove awards in the same season. (Note: Adrian Beltre in 2011, Anthony Rizzo in 2016, and Nolan Arenado in 2017, 2018, and 2022.)

==== 2026 ====
In 2026, Witt was named to his third consecutive MLB All-Star Game, and was named a starter for the first time. On July 22, he was placed on the injured list with back tightness; this marked the first time Witt had been placed on the injured list in his professional career. Witt was activated and returned to the Royals on August 4. He played in 143 games and finished the season with a .281 batting average, 18 home runs, 54 RBI, and 45 stolen bases.

On November 2, Witt was named a finalist for the American League Most Valuable Player Award alongside Yordan Alvarez and Junior Caminero.

== International career ==
Witt has played for the United States national baseball team and its youth team in international baseball tournaments. He played for Team USA's U-18 team, helping the Americans win the 2018 U-18 Pan-American Championships, held in Panama City, Panama. He won USA Baseball's International Performance of the Year after hitting for a natural cycle in the gold medal game.

Witt played for Team USA in the 2023 World Baseball Classic. He was the youngest player on the American roster and was primarily a pinch runner and defensive substitute. He played in five games but only got three plate appearances, hitting a double, drawing a walk, and scoring twice.

In June 2025, Witt was selected to Team USA's roster for the 2026 World Baseball Classic.

== Personal life ==
Witt's father, Bobby Witt, was an MLB pitcher for 16 seasons. The elder Witt is his son's agent and works at Octagon Baseball. Witt Jr. has three older sisters: Nikki, Kianna (who he calls "Kiki") and Shaley, who all married MLB players. His three brothers-in-law are James Russell, Zach Neal, and Cody Thomas. Witt has said that his sisters, along with his mother Laurie, have been a major influence in his life and career. He calls them his "four moms" and says they have always pushed him to be his best and comforted him when he needed it.

In June 2024, Whataburger signed an endorsement deal with Witt. Whataburger has numerous locations in Witt's home state of Texas and has expanded into Kansas City and various other cities. Witt Jr. is also an investor in Chinook Seedery, an Austin-based sunflower seed company.

On December 14, 2024, Witt married Maggie Black. The couple began dating in high school. A pop-up replica of a Whataburger restaurant, rebranded as "Wittaburger", was present at the couple's wedding reception.

Witt is a practicing Catholic. In March 2026, he received the sacrament of confirmation.

== See also ==
- Kansas City Royals award winners and league leaders
- List of largest sports contracts
- List of Major League Baseball annual triples leaders
- List of Major League Baseball batting champions
- List of second-generation Major League Baseball players
