= Kansas City Royals award winners and league leaders =

This is a list of award winners and league leaders for the Kansas City Royals professional baseball team.

== Regular-season awards ==
=== MVP Award ===
- 1980: George Brett

=== Cy Young Award ===
- 1985: Bret Saberhagen
- 1989: Bret Saberhagen
- 1994: David Cone
- 2009: Zack Greinke

=== Rookie of the Year ===
- 1969: Lou Piniella
- 1994: Bob Hamelin
- 1999: Carlos Beltrán
- 2003: Ángel Berroa

=== Comeback Player of the Year ===
- 2017: Mike Moustakas
- 2020: Salvador Perez

=== Silver Slugger Award ===
- 1980: George Brett and Willie Wilson
- 1982: Hal McRae and Willie Wilson
- 1985: George Brett
- 1986: Frank White
- 1988: George Brett
- 1995: Gary Gaetti
- 1998: Dean Palmer
- 2012: Billy Butler
- 2015: Kendrys Morales
- 2016: Salvador Perez
- 2017: Eric Hosmer
- 2018: Salvador Perez
- 2020: Salvador Perez
- 2021: Salvador Perez
- 2024: Salvador Perez and Bobby Witt Jr.
- 2025: Bobby Witt Jr.
- 2026: Bobby Witt Jr.

=== Rawlings Gold Glove Award ===
- 1971: Amos Otis
- 1973: Amos Otis
- 1974: Amos Otis
- 1977: Frank White and Al Cowens
- 1978: Frank White
- 1979: Frank White
- 1980: Frank White and Willie Wilson
- 1981: Frank White
- 1982: Frank White
- 1985: George Brett
- 1986: Frank White
- 1987: Frank White
- 1989: Bret Saberhagen and Bob Boone
- 2000: Jermaine Dye
- 2006: Mark Grudzielanek
- 2011: Alex Gordon
- 2012: Alex Gordon
- 2013: Salvador Perez, Eric Hosmer, and Alex Gordon
- 2014: Salvador Perez, Eric Hosmer, and Alex Gordon (Gordon-Rawlings Platinum Glove Award Winner)
- 2015: Salvador Perez, Eric Hosmer, and Alcides Escobar
- 2016: Salvador Perez
- 2017: Alex Gordon
- 2018: Alex Gordon and Salvador Perez
- 2019: Alex Gordon
- 2020: Alex Gordon (Gordon-Rawlings Platinum Gold Glove Award Winner)
- 2021: Andrew Benintendi and Michael A. Taylor
- 2024: Seth Lugo and Bobby Witt Jr.
- 2025: Maikel Garcia and Bobby Witt Jr.

=== Edgar Martínez Award ===
- 1976: Hal McRae
- 1980: Hal McRae
- 1982: Hal McRae
- 2012: Billy Butler
- 2015: Kendrys Morales

=== All-MLB Team ===
- 2020: Salvador Pérez (1st)
- 2021: Salvador Pérez (1st)
- 2024: Bobby Witt Jr. (1st), Seth Lugo (2nd) and Salvador Pérez (2nd)
- 2025: Bobby Witt Jr. (1st)
- 2026: Bobby Witt Jr. (1st)

=== Wilson Defensive Player of the Year Award ===
See explanatory note at Atlanta Braves.
Team (at all positions)

- (2012)
- (2013)

Left field (in MLB)

- Alex Gordon (2014)

Centerfield (in MLB)

- Lorenzo Cain (2014)

=== USA Today AL Top Rookie ===
- Eric Hosmer (2011)

=== Rolaids Relief Man of the Year ===
See footnote

Dan Quisenberry has won more Relief Man of the Year awards than any other player in baseball history.

- 1980: Dan Quisenberry
- 1982: Dan Quisenberry
- 1983: Dan Quisenberry
- 1984: Dan Quisenberry
- 1993: Jeff Montgomery

=== MLB "This Year in Baseball Awards" ===
Note: These awards are voted on by five groups for all of Major League Baseball (i.e., not one per league).
Note: These awards were renamed the "GIBBY Awards" (Greatness in Baseball Yearly) in 2010 and then the "Esurance MLB Awards" in 2015.

==== "Esurance MLB Awards" Best Major Leaguer, Postseason ====
- 2015 – Wade Davis

==== MLB "GIBBY Awards" Best Closer ====
- 2014 – Greg Holland

==== MLB "GIBBY Awards" Best Setup Man ====
- 2014 – Wade Davis

==== MLB "GIBBY Awards" Best Executive ====
- 2014 – Dayton Moore
- 2015 – Dayton Moore

=== Baseball America All-Rookie Team ===
See: Baseball America#Baseball America All-Rookie Team

- 2011 – Eric Hosmer (1B)

=== Manager of the Year ===
- 2003: Tony Peña

== Postseason and all-star game awards ==
=== World Series MVP ===
- 1985: Bret Saberhagen
- 2015: Salvador Perez

=== American League Championship Series MVP ===
- 1980: Frank White
- 1985: George Brett
- 2014: Lorenzo Cain
- 2015: Alcides Escobar

=== All-Star Game MVP ===
- 1989: Bo Jackson
- 2016: Eric Hosmer

== Team award ==
- 1980 – William Harridge Trophy (American League championship)
- 1985
- 1985 – Commissioner's Trophy (World Series championship)
- 1994 – Baseball America Organization of the Year
- 2014
- 2014 – Baseball America Organization of the Year
- 2015
- 2015

== Other achievements ==
=== Baseball Hall of Fame ===
See: Kansas City Royals#Baseball Hall of Famers

=== DHL Hometown Heroes (2006) ===
- George Brett — voted by MLB fans as the most outstanding player in the history of the franchise, based on on-field performance, leadership quality and character value

=== Ford C. Frick Award recipients ===
See: Kansas City Royals#Ford C. Frick Award recipients

=== Royals Hall of Fame ===
See: Kansas City Royals#Hall of Fame

=== Retired numbers ===
See: Kansas City Royals#Retired numbers

5 - George Brett; 10 - Dick Howser; 20 - Frank White; 42 - Jackie Robinson * ( retired across all of MLB) <kcroyals.com>

=== Sporting News Sportsman of the Year ===
See: Sporting News#Sportsman of the Year

=== Missouri Sports Hall of Fame ===
See: Kansas City Royals#Missouri Sports Hall of Fame

=== Kansas City Sports Walk of Stars ===
See: Barney Allis Plaza

- George Brett

== Season leaders ==
=== Batting champions ===
George Brett is the only person in baseball history to win a batting title in three different decades.

- 1976: George Brett (.333)
- 1980: George Brett (.390)
- 1982: Willie Wilson (.332)
- 1990: George Brett (.329)
- 2024: Bobby Witt Jr. (.332)

=== RBI ===
- 1982: Hal McRae

=== Runs Scored ===
- 2000: Johnny Damon

=== Wins (pitcher) ===
- 1977: Dennis Leonard
- 1989: Bret Saberhagen

=== ERA ===
- 1989: Bret Saberhagen
- 1993: Kevin Appier
- 2009: Zack Greinke

== See also ==
- Baseball awards
- List of MLB awards
